= Plzeň-City District =

Plzeň-City District Okres Plzeň-město
- District
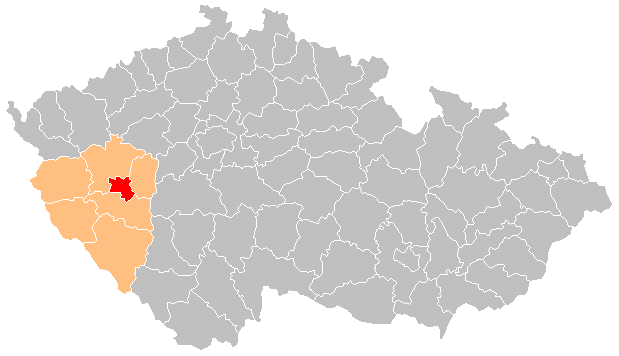
- Location in the Plzeň Region within the Czech Republic

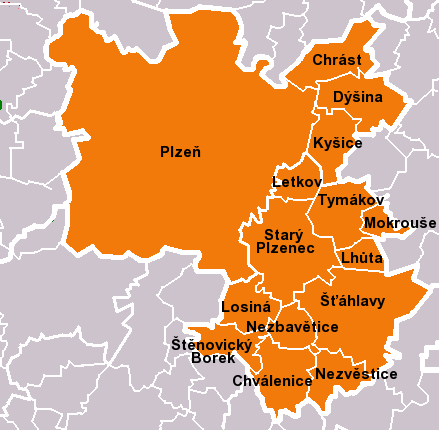
- Coordinates: 49°43′N 13°26′E
- Country: Czech Republic
- Region: Plzeň
- Capital: Plzeň

Area
  - Total: 261.42 km^{2} (100.93 sq mi)

Population (2026)
  - Total: 208,169
  - Density: 796.30/km^{2} (2,062.4/sq mi)
- Time zone: UTC+1 (CET)
  - Summer (DST): UTC+2 (CEST)
- Municipalities: 15
- * Cities and towns: 2
- * Market towns: 0

Plzeň-City District (Czech: okres Plzeň-město) is a district in the Plzeň Region of the Czech Republic. Its capital is the city of Plzeň.

== Administrative division ==
Plzeň-City District is formed by only one administrative district of municipality with extended competence: Plzeň.

=== List of municipalities ===
Cities and towns are marked in bold:

Dýšina - Chrást - Chválenice - Kyšice - Letkov - Lhůta - Losiná - Mokrouše - Nezbavětice - Nezvěstice - Plzeň - Starý Plzenec - Šťáhlavy - Štěnovický Borek - Tymákov

== Geography ==
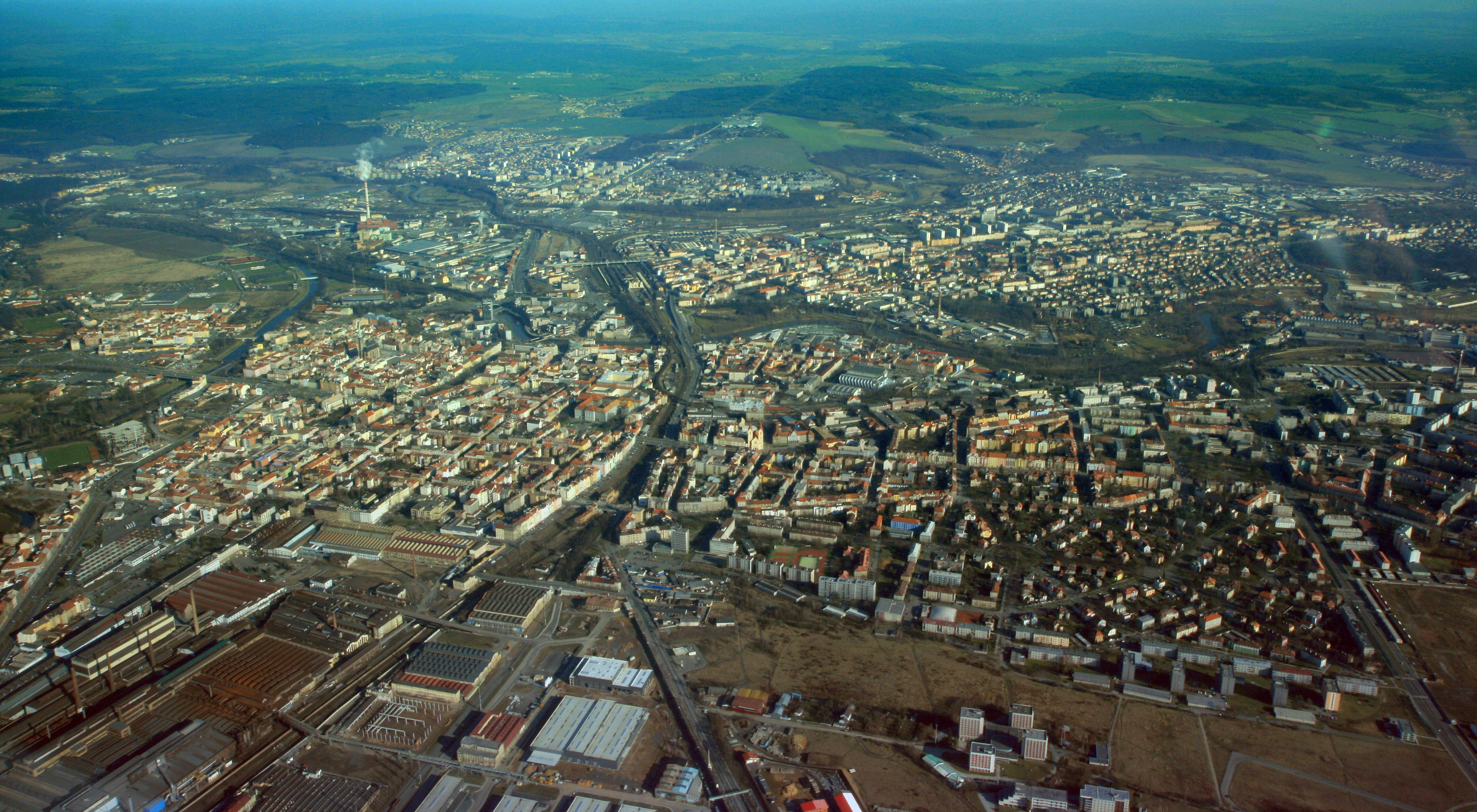
Aerial view of Plzeň

The terrain goes from slightly undulating in the west to hilly in the east. The territory extends into two geomorphological mesoregions: Švihov Highlands (southeast) and Plasy Uplands (northwest). The highest point of the district is the hill Radyně in Starý Plzenec with an elevation of 567 m (1,860 ft), the lowest point is the river bed of the Berounka in Chrást at 290 m (950 ft).

From the total district area of 261.4 km^{2} (100.9 sq mi), agricultural land occupies 124.0 km^{2} (47.9 sq mi), forests occupy 65.5 km^{2} (25.3 sq mi), and water area occupies 6.1 km^{2} (2.4 sq mi). Forests cover 25.0% of the district's area.

Four significant rivers flow into the district: Mže, Radbuza, Úhlava and Úslava. Their confluence in Plzeň forms the Berounka River, which flows along the district border further to the northeast. The largest body of water is České údolí Reservoir, built on the Radbuza.

There are no large-scale protected areas.

== Demographics ==
Historical population

Year	Pop.	±%
1869	40,938	—
1880	59,005	+44.1%
1890	74,822	+26.8%
1900	102,720	+37.3%
1910	124,452	+21.2%

Year	Pop.	±%
1921	135,538	+8.9%
1930	150,271	+10.9%
1950	142,147	−5.4%
1961	156,191	+9.9%
1970	168,891	+8.1%

Year	Pop.	±%
1980	186,593	+10.5%
1991	188,158	+0.8%
2001	180,748	−3.9%
2011	188,045	+4.0%
2021	193,858	+3.1%

Source: Censuses

=== Most populous municipalities ===
Name	Population	Area (km^{2})
Plzeň	187,863	138
Starý Plzenec	5,290	18
Šťáhlavy	2,894	24
Dýšina	1,941	10
Chrást	1,912	10
Nezvěstice	1,461	6
Losiná	1,427	7

== Economy ==
Plzeň is the economic centre of the entire Plzeň Region. Almost all the employers with headquarters in Plzeň-City District and at least 500 employers have their seat in Plzeň, with the only exception being Hermes Fulfilment in Šťáhlavy. The largest of these companies with at least 1,000 employees are:

Economic entity	Number of employees	Main activity
University Hospital Plzeň	5,000–9,999	Health care
University of West Bohemia	3,000–3,999	Education
Pilsner Urquell Brewery	2,500–2,999	Brewery
Škoda Transportation	2,500–2,999	Manufacture of railway vehicles
Regional Police Directorate of the Plzeň Region	2,500–2,999	Public order and safety activities
City of Plzeň	2,000–2,499	Public administration
Daikin Industries Czech Republic	1,500–1,999	Manufacture of air conditioning technology
Autoneum	1,000–1,599	Manufacture of textiles for the automotive industry
Doosan Škoda Power	1,000–1,499	Manufacture of steam turbines
HP-Pelzer	1,000–1,499	Automotive industry
JTEKT Czech Republic	1,000–1,499	Automotive industry
Lasselsberger	1,000–1,499	Manufacture of ceramic tiles
Plzeňské městské dopravní podniky	1,000–1,499	Urban and suburban passenger transport
Safran Cabin CZ	1,000–1,499	Manufacture of aircraft equipment
Škoda Electric	1,000–1,499	Manufacture of electric drives

== Transport ==
The D5 motorway (part of the European route E50) from Prague to Plzeň and the Czech–German border runs through the district.

== Sights ==
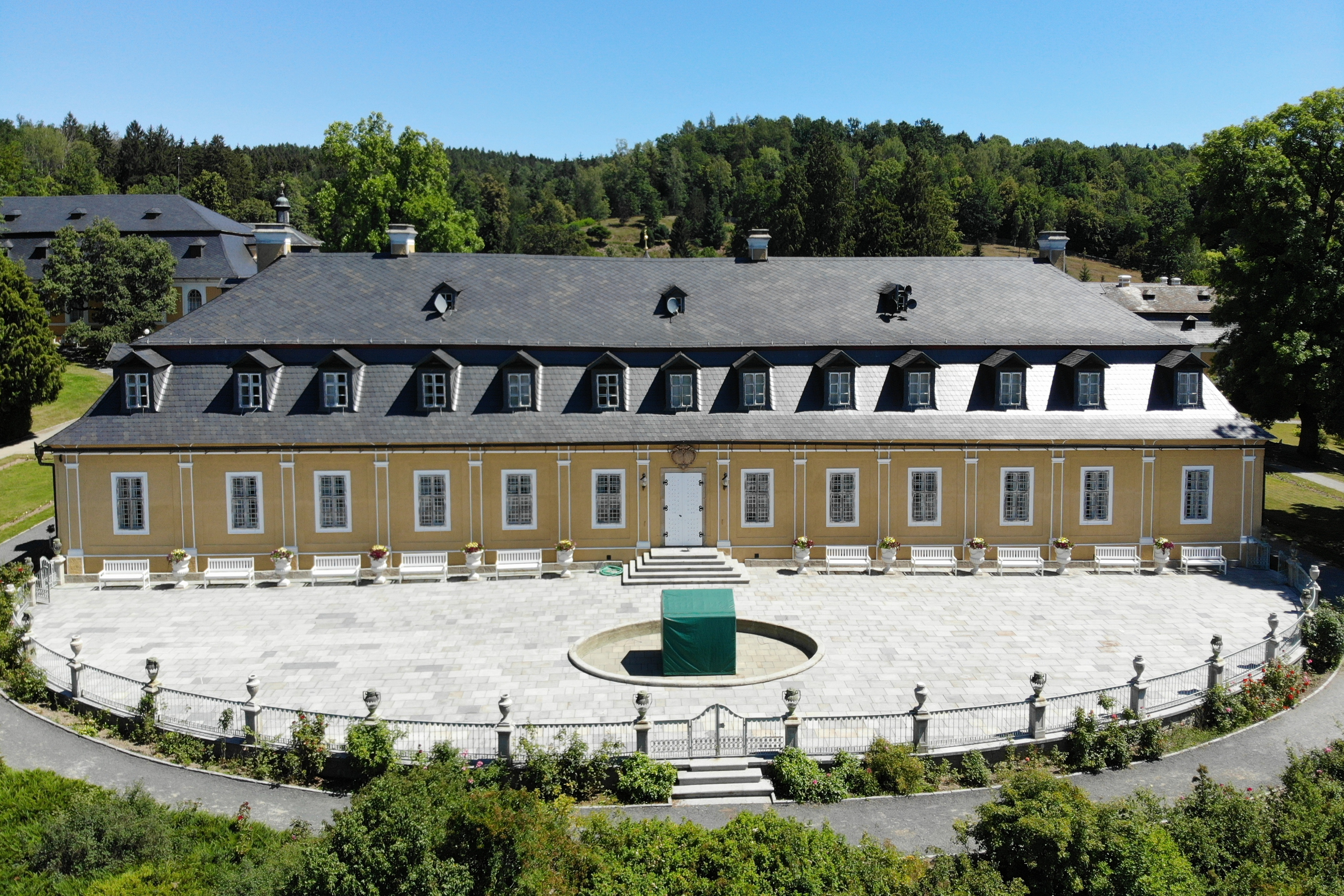
Kozel Castle

The most important monuments in the district, protected as national cultural monuments, are:

- Hůrka gord in Starý Plzenec
- Cathedral of St. Bartholomew in Plzeň
- Kozel Castle
- Rural homestead in Plzeň-Bolevec
- Plzeň City Hall

The best-preserved settlements, protected as monument reservations and monument zones, are:

- Plzeň (monument reservation)
- Plzeň-Božkov (monument reservation)
- Plzeň-Černice (monument reservation)
- Plzeň-Koterov (monument reservation)
- Dýšina
- Kyšice
- Plzeň-Bezovka
- Plzeň-Bolevec
- Plzeň-Bukovec
- Plzeň-Červený Hrádek
- Plzeň-Křimice
- Plzeň-Lobzy
- Plzeň-Lochotín
- Plzeň-Radčice
- Plzeň-Újezd
- Tymákov

The most visited tourist destinations are the Plzeň Zoo, DinoPark Plzeň, tower of the Cathedral of St. Bartholomew in Plzeň, and Radyně Castle.
