= Lhůta =

- Municipality
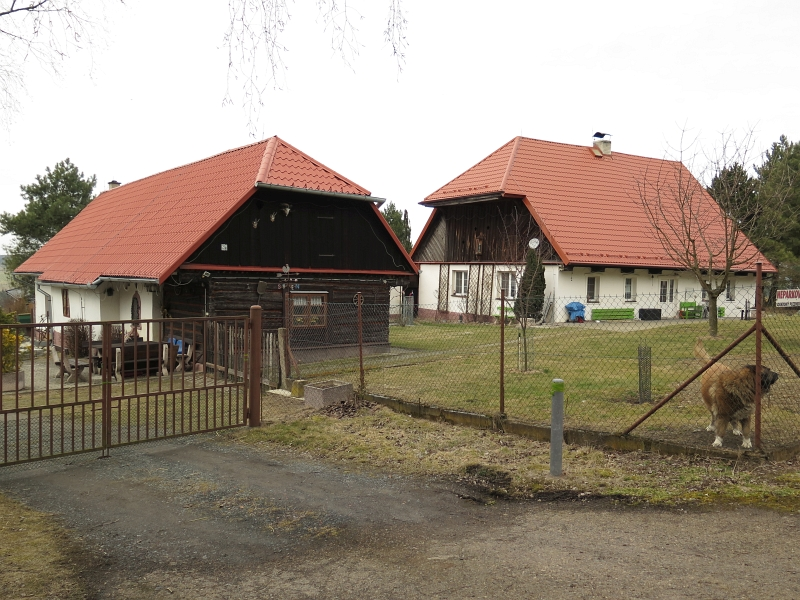
- Hvížďalka smithy

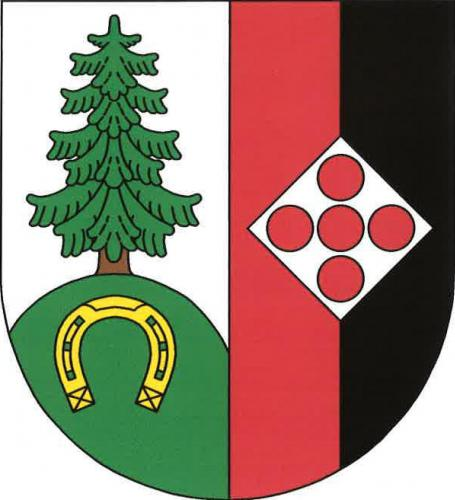
- Flag Coat of arms

- Location in the Czech Republic
- Coordinates: 49°42′7″N 13°31′40″E
- Country: Czech Republic
- Region: Plzeň
- District: Plzeň-City
- First mentioned: 1366

Area
  - Total: 3.41 km^{2} (1.32 sq mi)
- Elevation: 445 m (1,460 ft)

Population (2026-01-01)
  - Total: 220
  - Density: 65/km^{2} (170/sq mi)
- Time zone: UTC+1 (CET)
  - Summer (DST): UTC+2 (CEST)
- Postal code: 332 01
- Website: www.obec-lhuta.cz

Lhůta is a municipality and village in Plzeň-City District in the Plzeň Region of the Czech Republic. It has about 200 inhabitants.

== Etymology ==
The initial name of the village was Lhota. Lhota is the most common name of Czech villages, meaning 'grace period'. The village was also sometimes called Lhota Dobrá Voda ('Lhota good water'), referring to its location at a spring of water. The name Lhůta has been used since 1924.

== Geography ==
Lhůta is located about 10 kilometres (6 mi) southeast of Plzeň. It lies in the Švihov Highlands. The highest point is at 535 m (1,755 ft) above sea level.

== History ==
The first written mention of Lhůta is from 1366. The village was divided into two parts with different owners. One part belonged to the Šťáhlavy estate and the other to the Raková estate. In 1584 at the latest, the entire village belonged to the Šťáhlavy estate. The village was part of this estate until the establishment of an independent municipality in 1850.

== Demographics ==
Historical population

Year	Pop.	±%
1869	340	—
1880	357	+5.0%
1890	355	−0.6%
1900	412	+16.1%
1910	412	+0.0%

Year	Pop.	±%
1921	361	−12.4%
1930	350	−3.0%
1950	265	−24.3%
1961	247	−6.8%
1970	206	−16.6%

Year	Pop.	±%
1980	189	−8.3%
1991	145	−23.3%
2001	144	−0.7%
2011	174	+20.8%
2021	206	+18.4%

Source: Censuses

== Transport ==
There are no railways or major roads passing through the municipality.

== Sights ==
The only protected cultural monument in the municipality is the Hvížďalka smithy. This former smithy was built around 1793 and initially served as a gamekeeper's lodge.
