= Starý Plzenec =

- Town
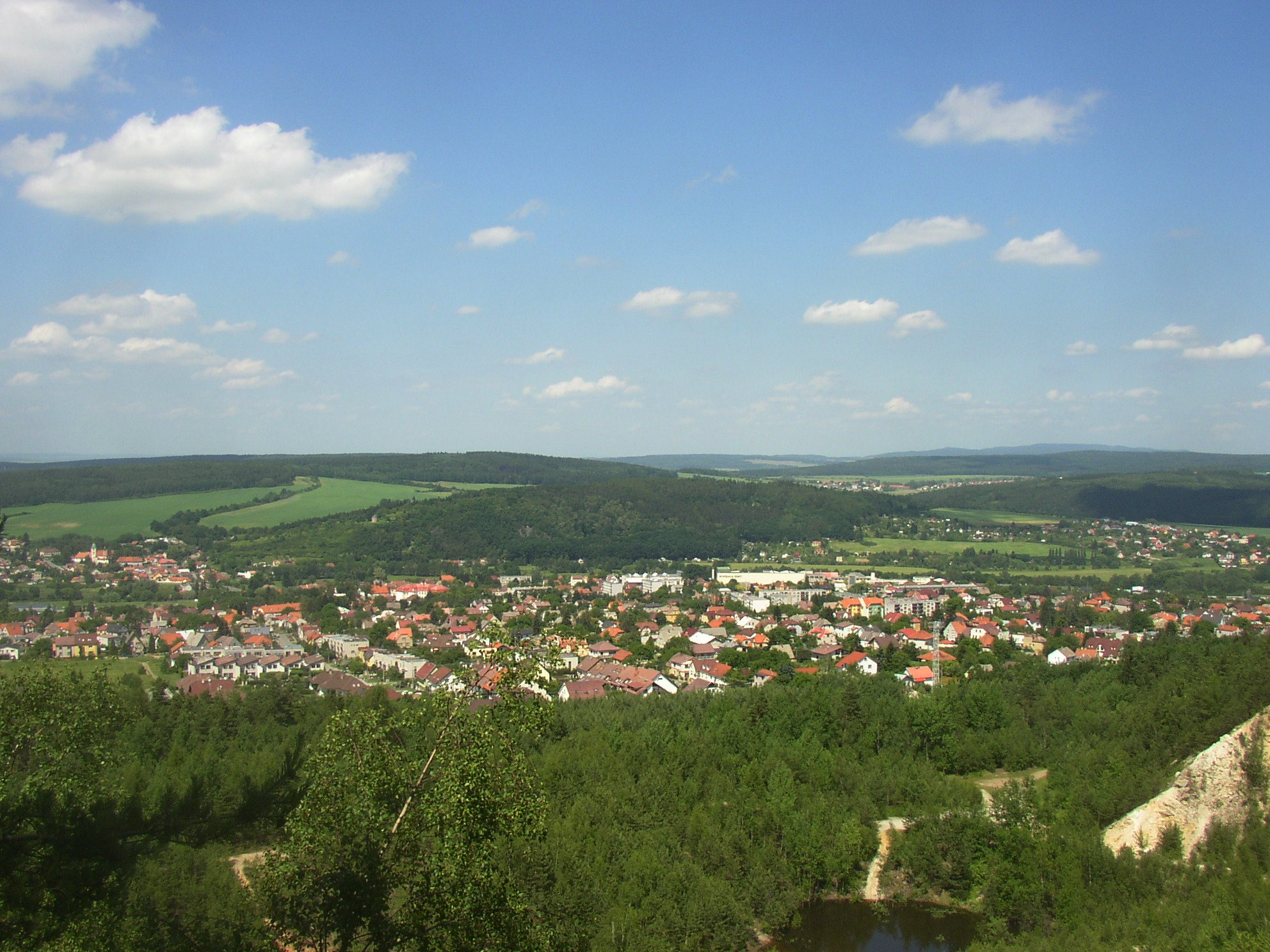
- Starý Plzenec as seen from the hill Radyně

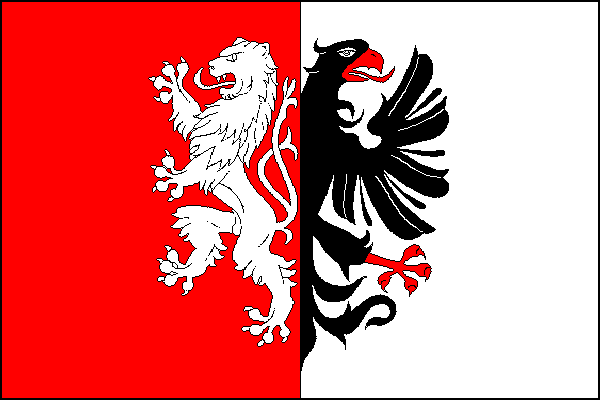
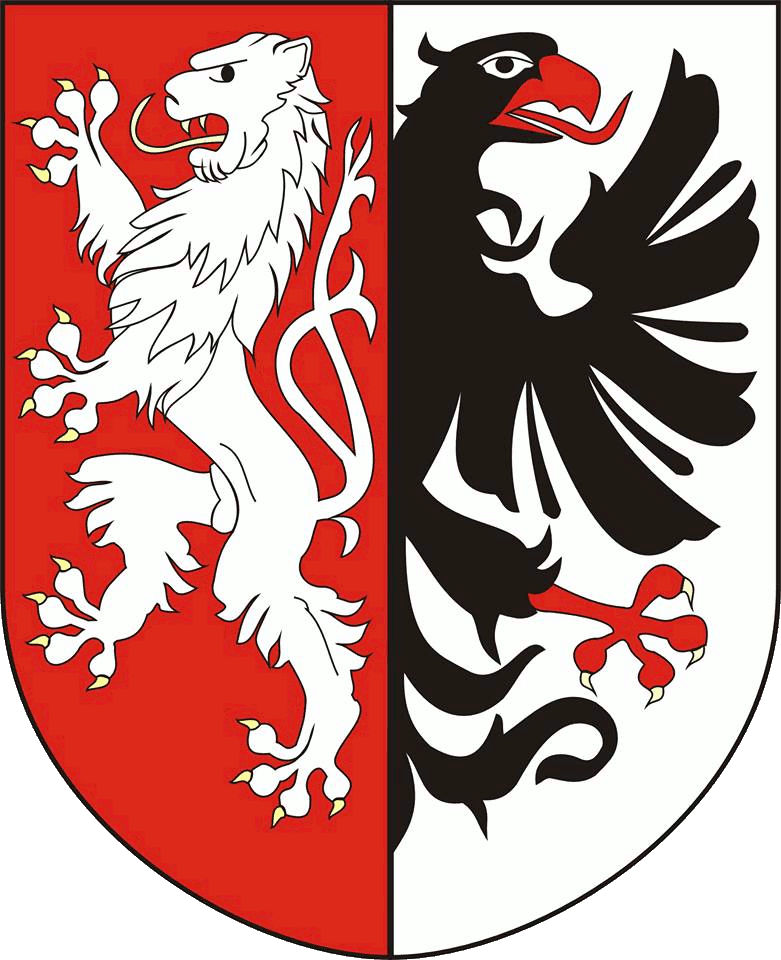
- Flag Coat of arms

- Location in the Czech Republic
- Coordinates: 49°41′52″N 13°28′25″E
- Country: Czech Republic
- Region: Plzeň
- District: Plzeň-City
- First mentioned: 976

Government
  - Mayor: Jan Eret

Area
  - Total: 18.37 km^{2} (7.09 sq mi)
- Elevation: 343 m (1,125 ft)

Population (2026-01-01)
  - Total: 5,290
  - Density: 288/km^{2} (746/sq mi)
- Time zone: UTC+1 (CET)
  - Summer (DST): UTC+2 (CEST)
- Postal code: 332 02
- Website: www.staryplzenec.cz

Starý Plzenec (Czech pronunciation: [ˈstariː ˈpl̩zɛnɛts]; German: Altpilsen) is a town in Plzeň-City District in the Plzeň Region of the Czech Republic. It has about 5,300 inhabitants. The town is located on the Úslava River in the Švihov Highlands.

Starý Plzenec is known for the production of sparkling wine. The most important monument of the town is the area of the hill Hůrka with a Romanesque church from the late 10th century and remnants of a Slavic gord. The area is protected as a national cultural monument.

== Administrative division ==
Starý Plzenec consists of two municipal parts (in brackets population according to the 2021 census):

- Starý Plzenec (4,291)
- Sedlec (941)

== Geography ==
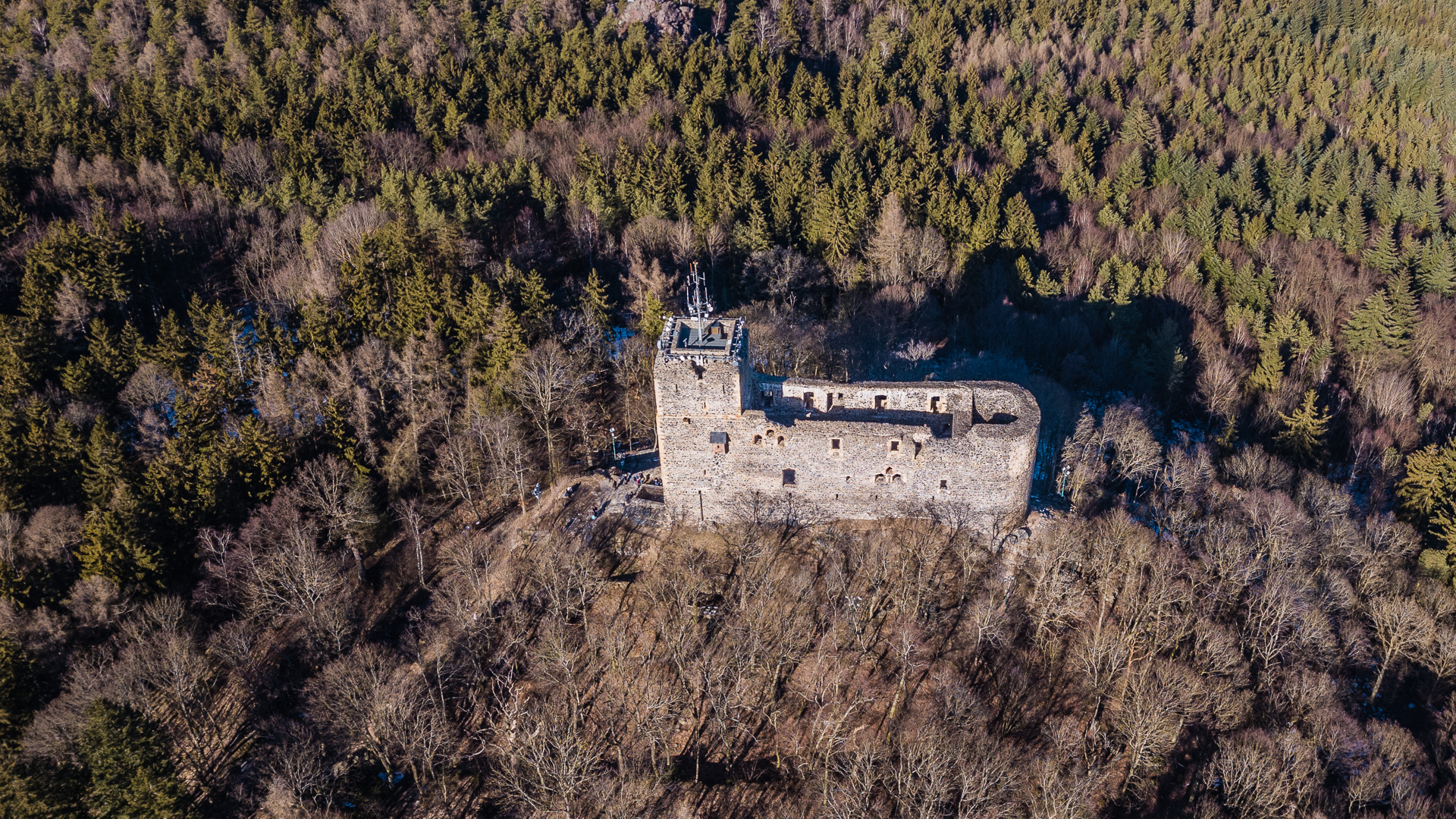
Radyně Castle on the hill Radyně

Starý Plzenec is located about 5 kilometres (3 mi) southeast of Plzeň. It lies in the Švihov Highlands. The highest point is the Radyně Hill at 567 m (1,860 ft) above sea level. The Úslava River flows through the town.

== History ==
The first written mention of the settlement is from a chronicle of Thietmar of Merseburg and dates to 976, when Duke Boleslaus II defeated a Bavarian army below a local stronghold, then called Plzeň. The urban settlement below the castle evolved into an administrative and mercantile centre of western Bohemia, but this came to an end in 1295, when King Wenceslaus II founded the new city of Plzeň in a more suitable location at the nearby confluence of the Mže and Radbuza rivers. The new city soon took over the functions of old Plzeň and became known as Nová Plzeň ('new Plzeň', later simply Plzeň), while the older settlement was called Stará Plzeň ('old Plzeň'). From 1442 at the latest, the old town was called Starý Plzenec.

== Demographics ==
Historical population

Year	Pop.	±%
1869	1,897	—
1880	2,107	+11.1%
1890	2,231	+5.9%
1900	2,544	+14.0%
1910	2,847	+11.9%

Year	Pop.	±%
1921	3,278	+15.1%
1930	4,451	+35.8%
1950	4,150	−6.8%
1961	4,390	+5.8%
1970	4,199	−4.4%

Year	Pop.	±%
1980	4,144	−1.3%
1991	4,054	−2.2%
2001	4,243	+4.7%
2011	4,952	+16.7%
2021	5,232	+5.7%

Source: Censuses

== Economy ==
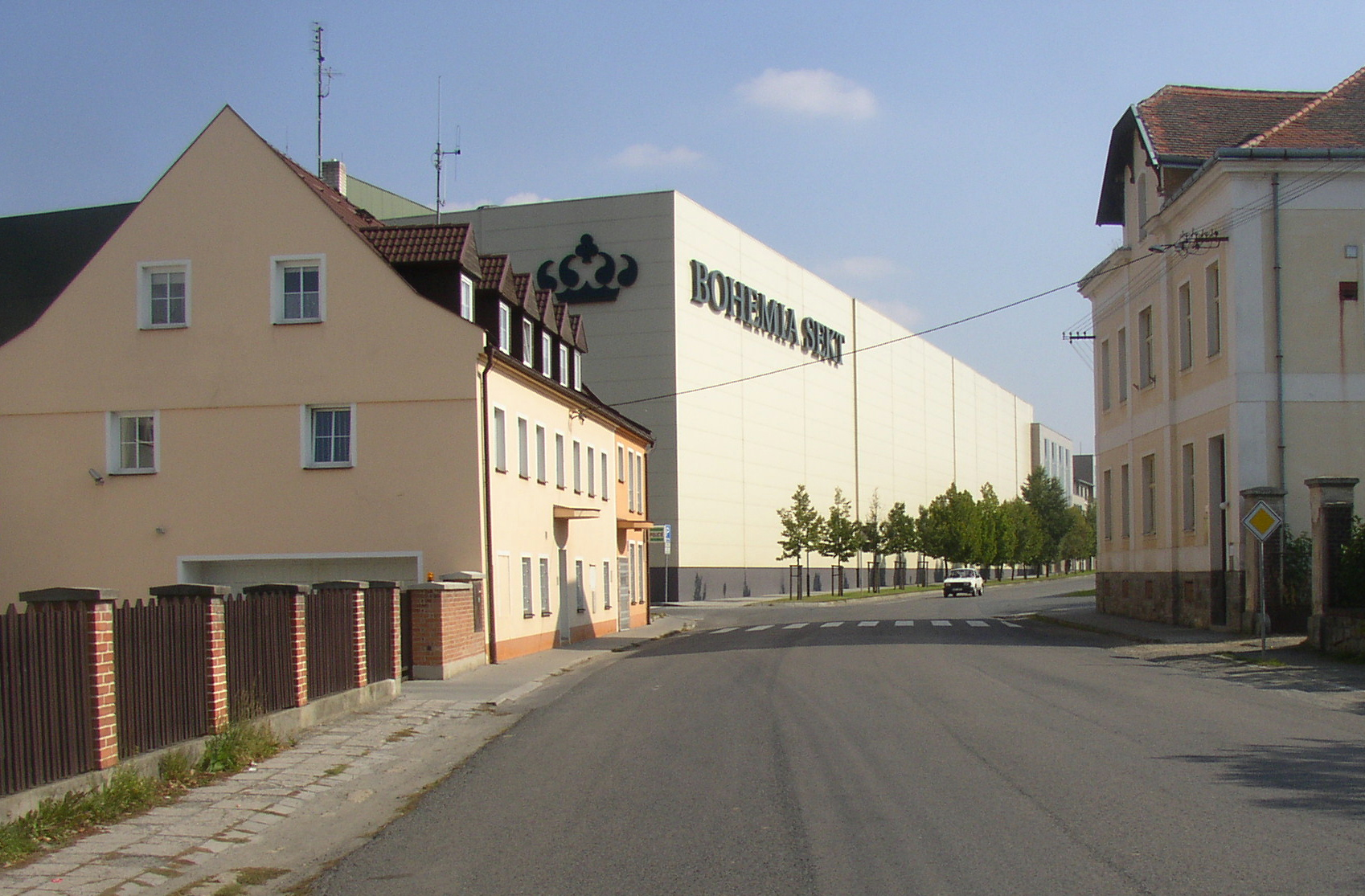
Bohemia Sekt factory

Starý Plzenec is known for the sparkling wine producer, Bohemia Sekt company. It is the biggest sparking wine producer in the Czech Republic and one of the biggest in Central and Eastern Europe. The production started here in 1943 in the premises of the former brewery, which was active in 1873–1929.

== Transport ==
The D5 motorway, which connects Prague with Plzeň, runs through the municipal territory.

Starý Plzenec is located on the railway line Plzeň–Nepomuk.

== Sights ==
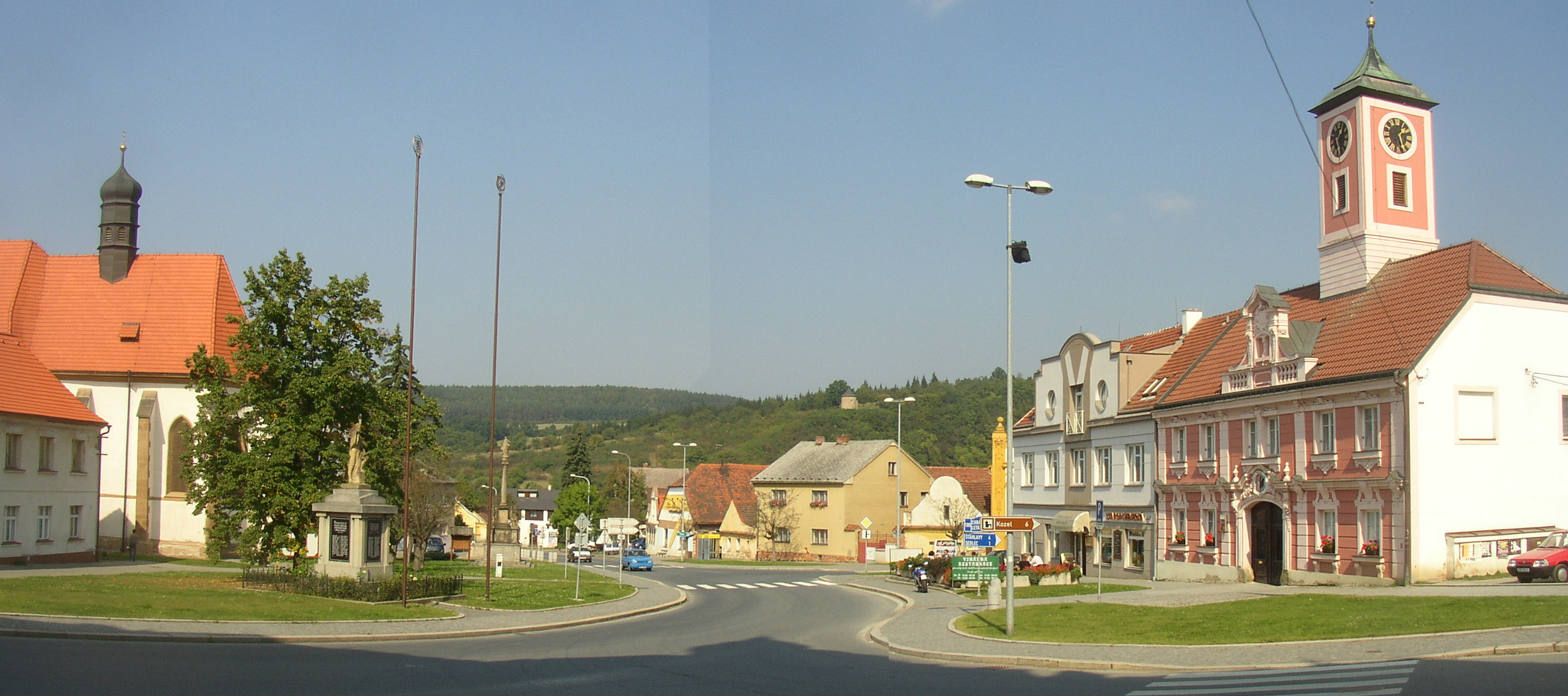
The square Masarykovo náměstí with the Church of Saint John The Baptist (left) and town hall (right)

Radyně Castle is a ruin of a medieval castle from the 14th century open to the public, located on the hill Radyně above the town (to the south).

On the hill Hůrka above the town are the Rotunda of Saints Peter and Paul (a Romanesque church from the late 10th century) and the foundations of other buildings of the old gord. Since 1978, the area has been protected as a national cultural monument.

== Notable people ==
- Filip Jícha (born 1982), handballer
