= Losiná =

- Municipality
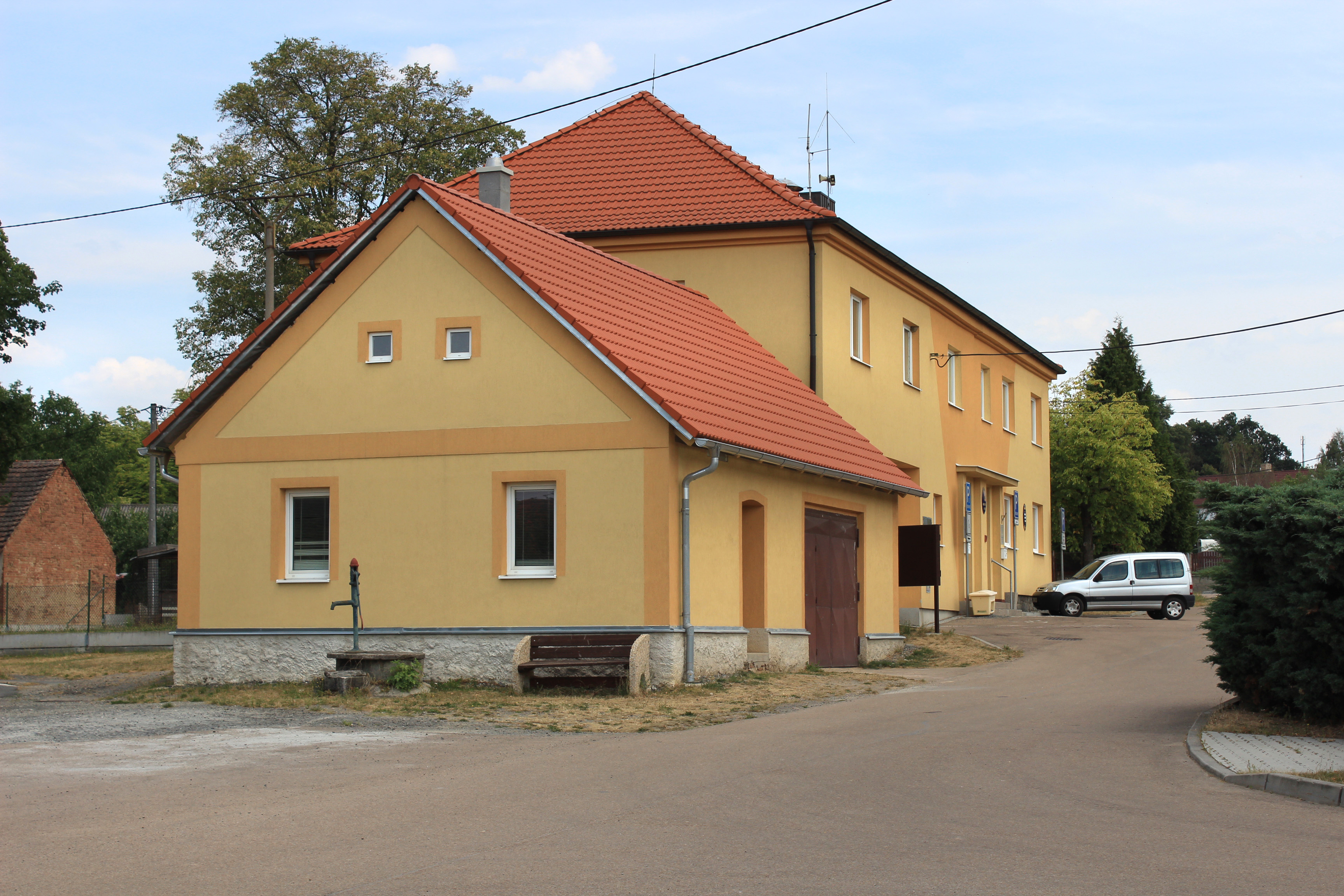
- Municipal office

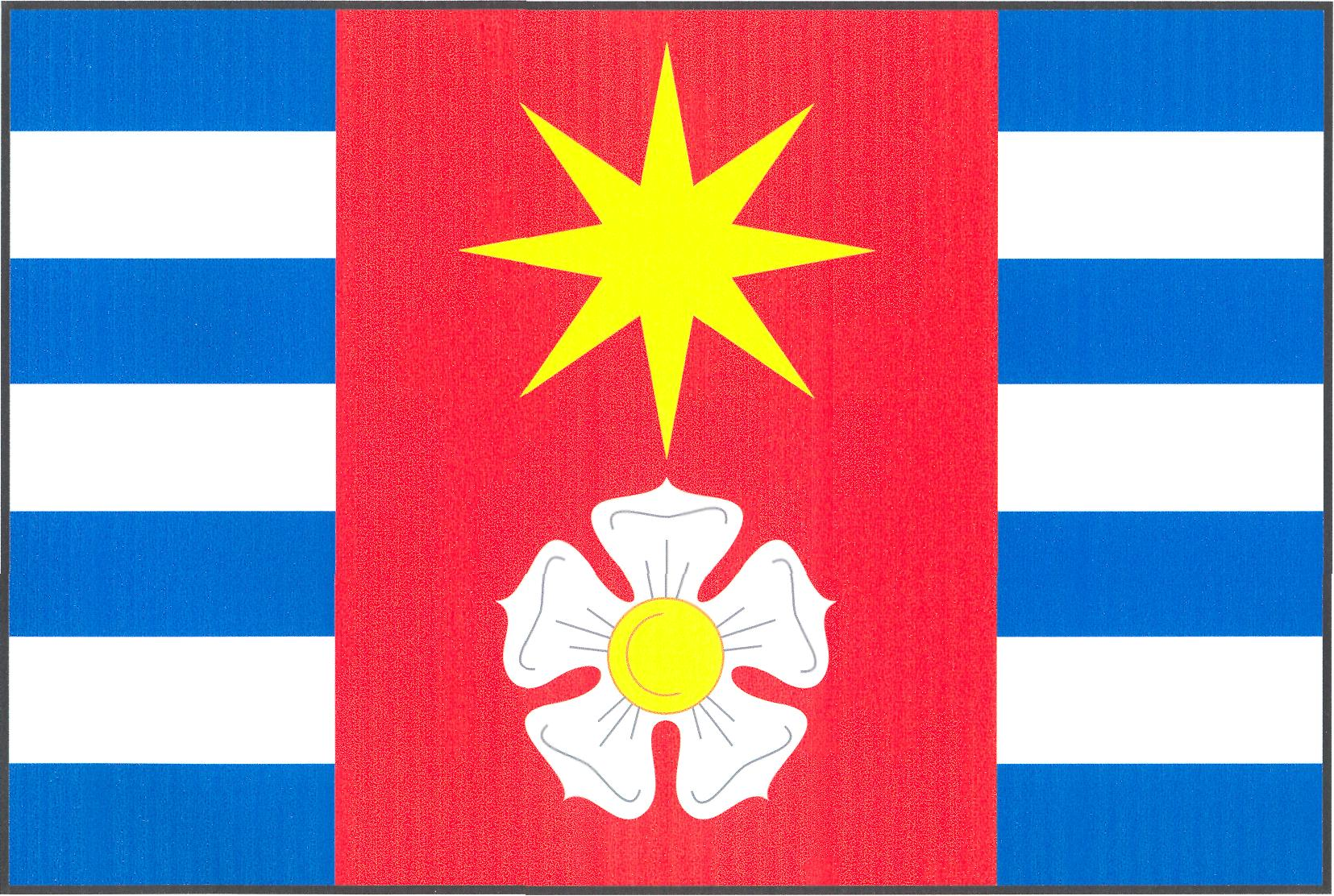
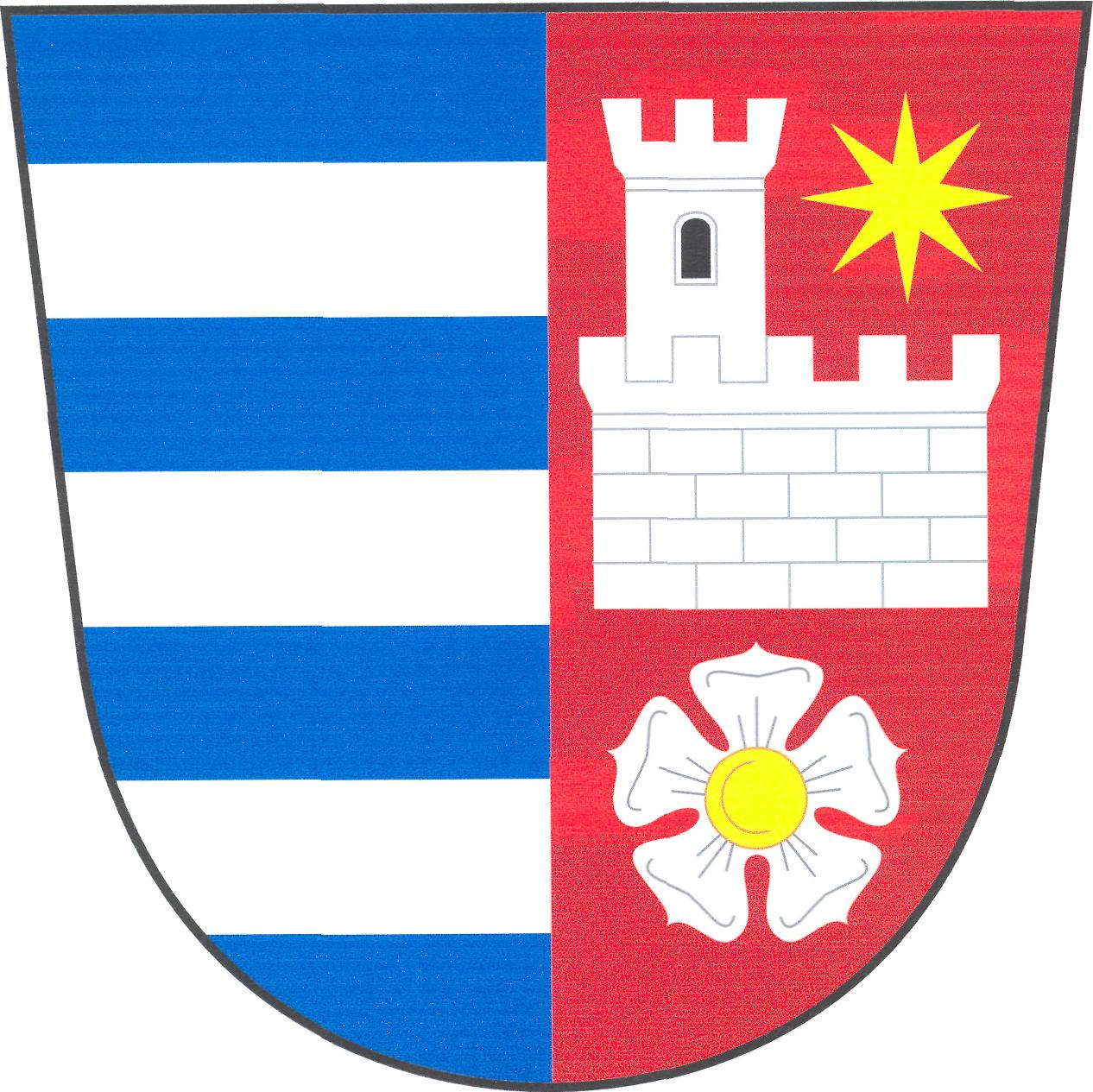
- Flag Coat of arms

- Location in the Czech Republic
- Coordinates: 49°40′9″N 13°27′9″E
- Country: Czech Republic
- Region: Plzeň
- District: Plzeň-City
- First mentioned: 1327

Area
  - Total: 6.79 km^{2} (2.62 sq mi)
- Elevation: 406 m (1,332 ft)

Population (2026-01-01)
  - Total: 1,427
  - Density: 210/km^{2} (544/sq mi)
- Time zone: UTC+1 (CET)
  - Summer (DST): UTC+2 (CEST)
- Postal code: 332 04
- Website: www.losina.cz

Losiná (German: Lossin) is a municipality and village in Plzeň-City District in the Plzeň Region of the Czech Republic. It has about 1,400 inhabitants.

Losiná lies approximately 11 kilometres (7 mi) south-east of Plzeň and 84 km (52 mi) south-west of Prague.

== Demographics ==
Historical population
Year	Pop.	±%
1869	507	—
1880	551	+8.7%
1890	580	+5.3%
1900	628	+8.3%
1910	654	+4.1%
1921	669	+2.3%
1930	781	+16.7%
1950	679	−13.1%
1961	761	+12.1%
1970	805	+5.8%
1980	823	+2.2%
1991	843	+2.4%
2001	856	+1.5%
2011	1,157	+35.2%
2021	1,424	+23.1%
Source: Censuses
