= Dýšina =

- Municipality
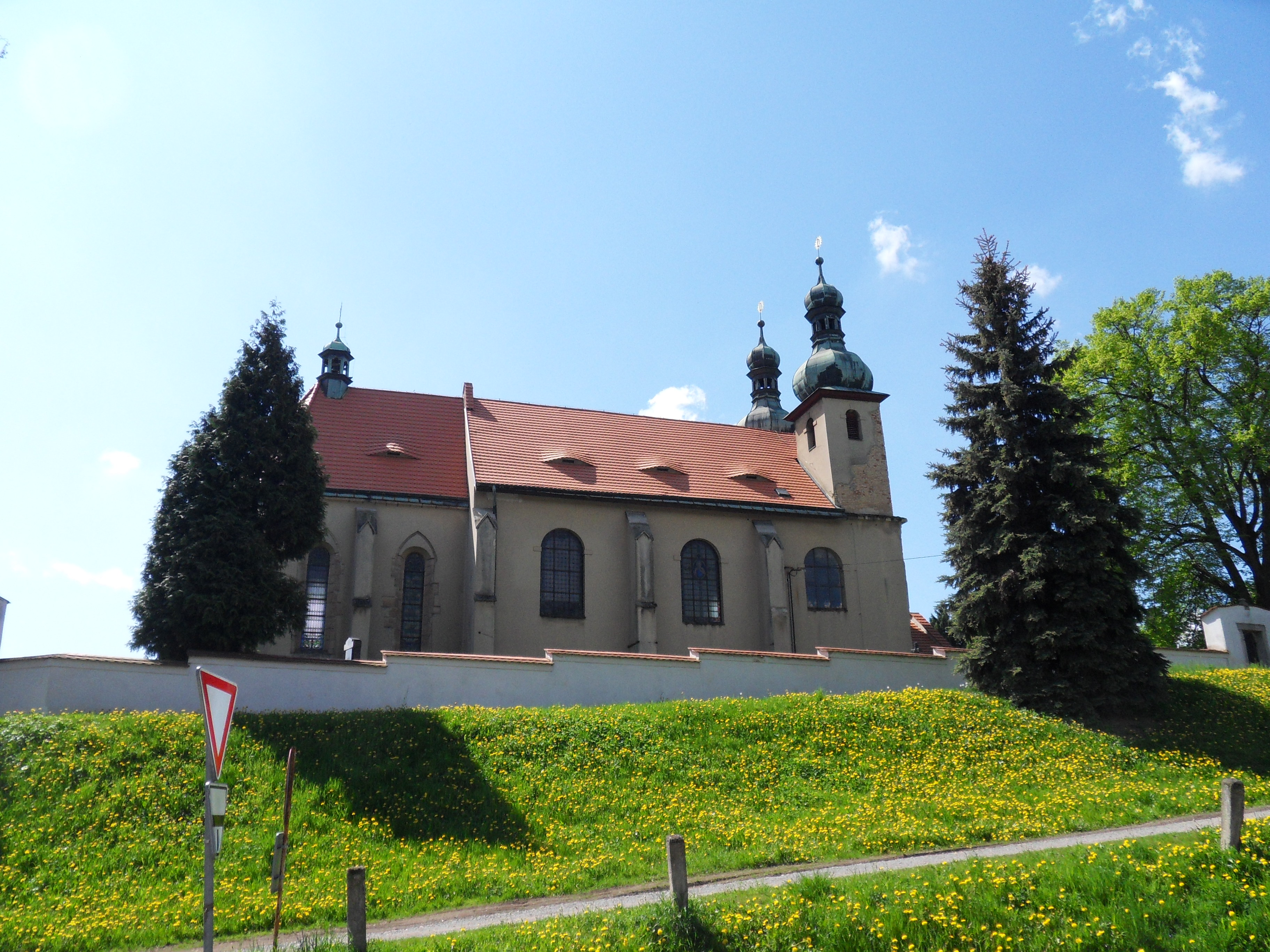
- Church of the Holy Trinity and Saints Simon and Jude

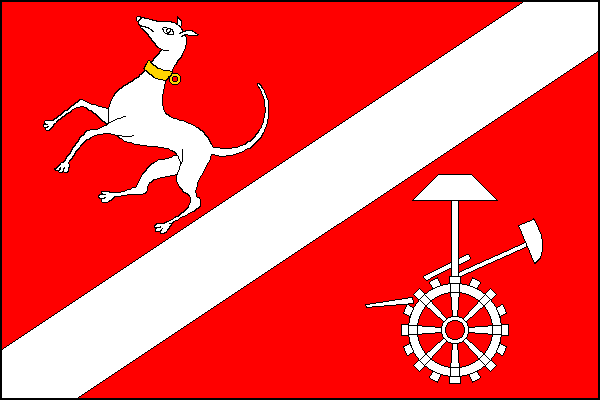
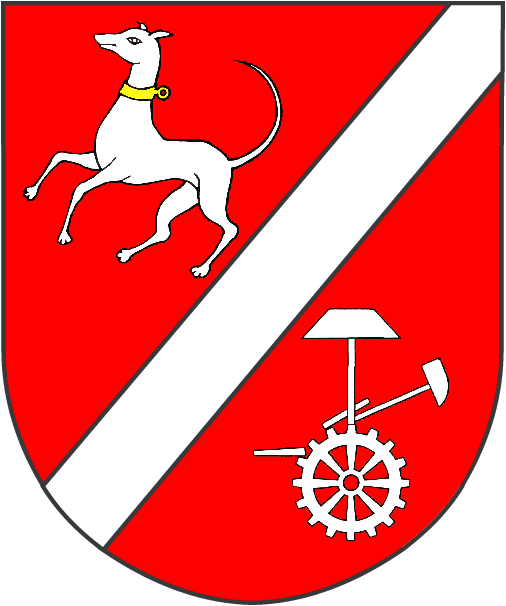
- Flag Coat of arms

- Location in the Czech Republic
- Coordinates: 49°46′36″N 13°29′37″E
- Country: Czech Republic
- Region: Plzeň
- District: Plzeň-City
- First mentioned: 1242

Area
  - Total: 10.39 km^{2} (4.01 sq mi)
- Elevation: 361 m (1,184 ft)

Population (2026-01-01)
  - Total: 1,941
  - Density: 186.8/km^{2} (483.8/sq mi)
- Time zone: UTC+1 (CET)
  - Summer (DST): UTC+2 (CEST)
- Postal code: 330 02
- Website: www.obecdysina.cz

Dýšina is a municipality and village in Plzeň-City District in the Plzeň Region of the Czech Republic. It has about 1,900 inhabitants.

== Administrative division ==
Dýšina consists of two municipal parts (in brackets population according to the 2021 census):

- Dýšina (1,427)
- Nová Huť (394)

== Etymology ==
The name is derived from the personal name Dýcha, meaning "Dýcha's village".

== Geography ==
Dýšina is located about 8 kilometres (5 mi) east of Plzeň. The western part of the municipal territory with the built-up area lies in the Plasy Uplands. The eastern forested part lies in the Švihov Highlands and includes the highest point of Dýšina, the hill Ostrý kámen at 474 m (1,555 ft) above sea level. The Klabava River flows through the municipality.

== History ==
The first written mention of Dýšina is from 1242.

== Demographics ==
Historical population

Year	Pop.	±%
1869	695	—
1880	719	+3.5%
1890	772	+7.4%
1900	778	+0.8%
1910	801	+3.0%

Year	Pop.	±%
1921	835	+4.2%
1930	1,029	+23.2%
1950	1,234	+19.9%
1961	1,765	+43.0%
1970	1,718	−2.7%

Year	Pop.	±%
1980	1,545	−10.1%
1991	1,346	−12.9%
2001	1,352	+0.4%
2011	1,816	+34.3%
2021	1,821	+0.3%

Source: Censuses

== Transport ==
Dýšina is located on the railway line Radnice–Bezdružice via Plzeň.

== Sport ==
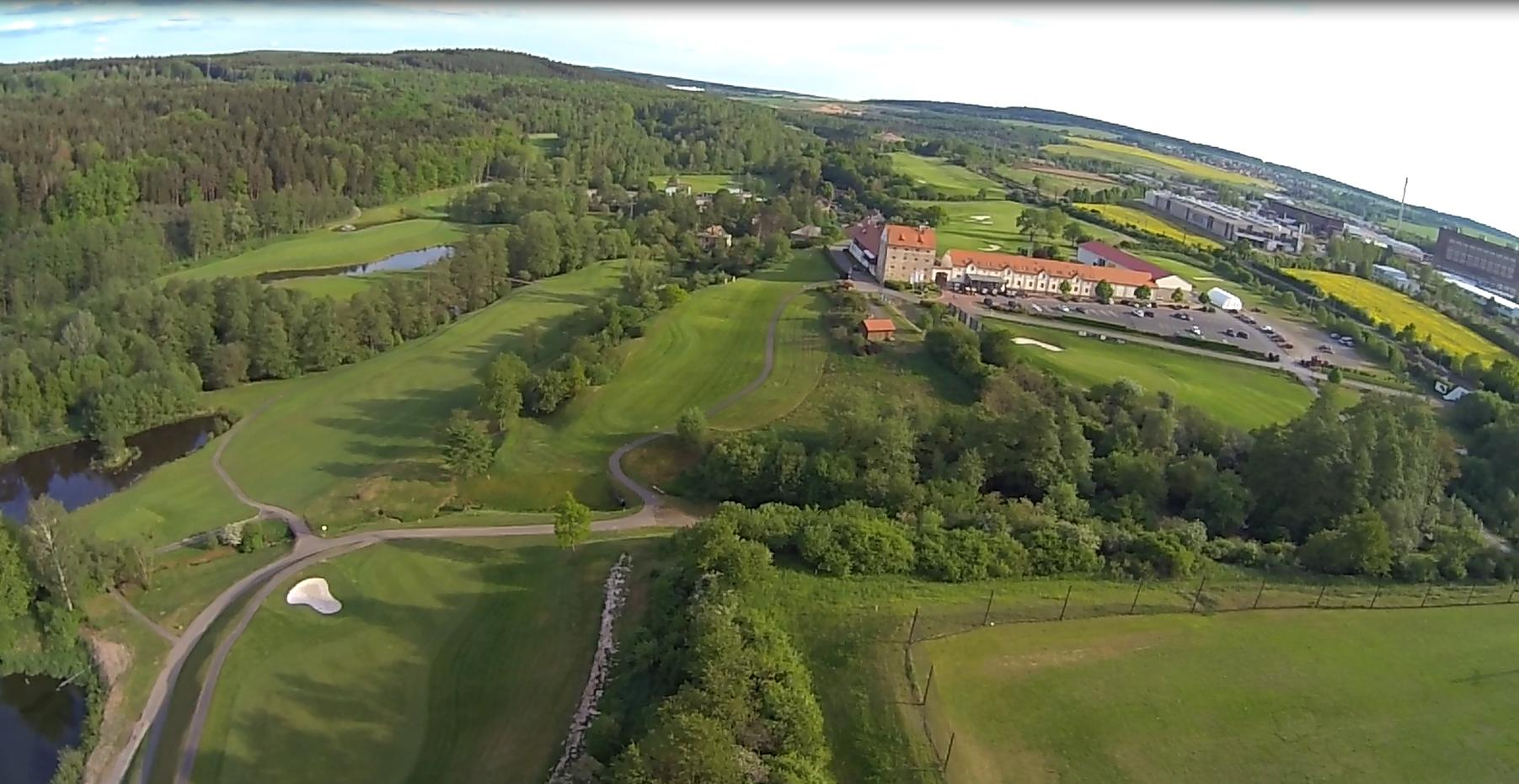
Golf course in Dýšina

Dýšina is known for its golf course.

== Sights ==
The main landmark of Dýšina is the Church of the Holy Trinity and Saints Simon and Jude. It was originally a Gothic church from the second half of the 14th century, rebuilt in the Baroque style in the 1690s.

For its preserved folk architecture, the historic centre of the village is protected as a village monument zone. It is one of the most important sets of brick folk architecture and folk Neoclassicism of the 19th century in the region.

== Notable people ==
- Peter Grünberg (1939–2018), German physicist, Nobel Prize laureate
- Václav Riedlbauch (1947–2017), composer and politician
