= Šťáhlavy =

- Municipality
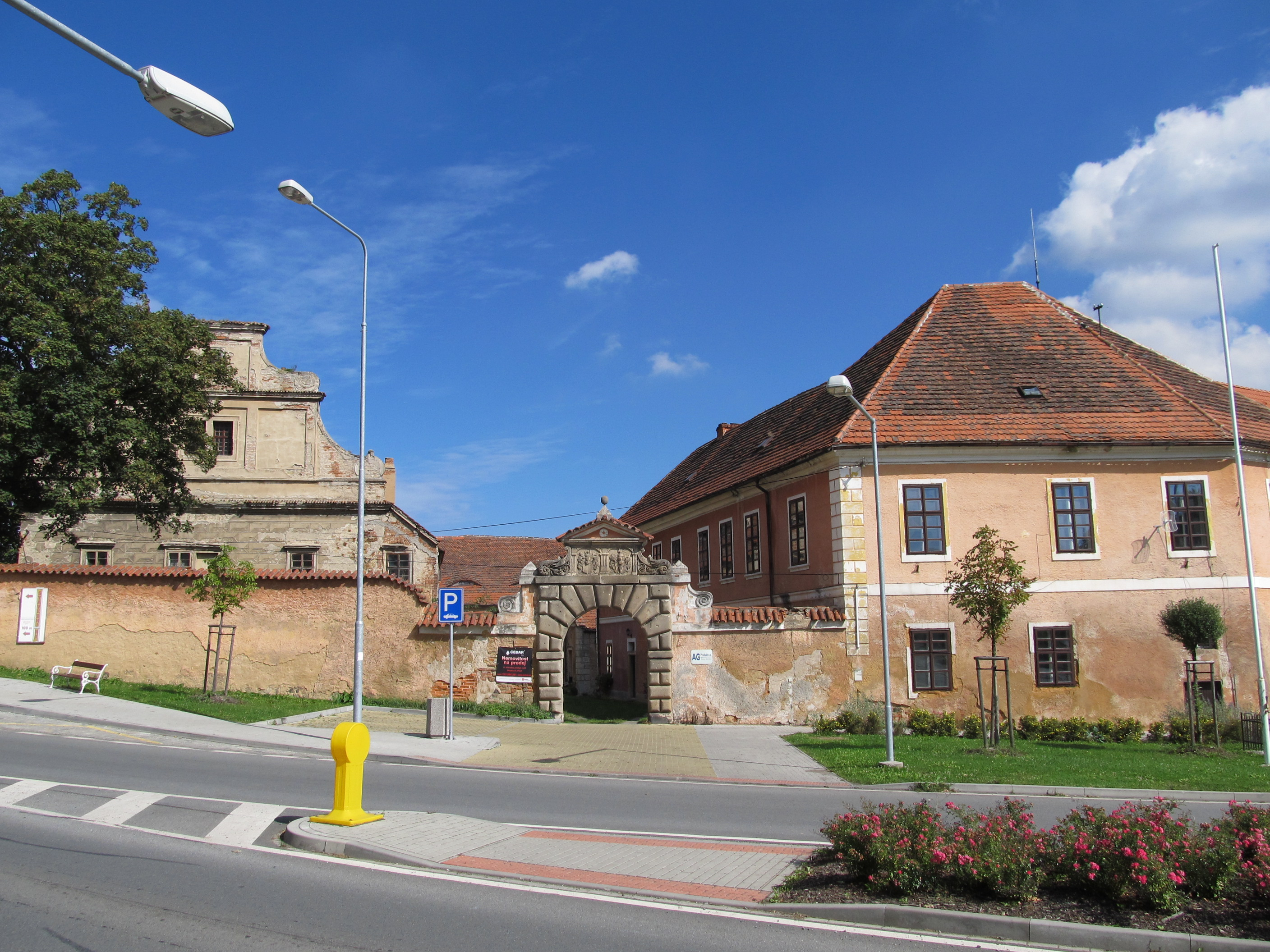
- Šťáhlavy Castle

- Flag Coat of arms

- Location in the Czech Republic
- Coordinates: 49°40′32″N 13°30′14″E
- Country: Czech Republic
- Region: Plzeň
- District: Plzeň-City
- First mentioned: 1239

Area
  - Total: 23.97 km^{2} (9.25 sq mi)
- Elevation: 362 m (1,188 ft)

Population (2026-01-01)
  - Total: 2,894
  - Density: 120.7/km^{2} (312.7/sq mi)
- Time zone: UTC+1 (CET)
  - Summer (DST): UTC+2 (CEST)
- Postal codes: 332 03, 332 04
- Website: www.stahlavy.cz

Šťáhlavy (Czech pronunciation: [ˈʃcaːɦlavɪ]) is a municipality and village in Plzeň-City District in the Plzeň Region of the Czech Republic. It has about 2,900 inhabitants. The municipality is located on the Úslava River in the Švihov Highlands. Šťáhlavy is known for the Kozel Castle, which is protected as a national cultural monument.

== Administrative division ==
Šťáhlavy consists of two municipal parts (in brackets population according to the 2021 census):

- Šťáhlavy (2,314)
- Šťáhlavice (609)

== Etymology ==
The origin of the name Šťáhlavy is uncertain. According to one theory, it was derived from the Old Czech verb stieti ('to cut off'; third person past tense sťal) and the Czech word hlavy ('heads'), meaning "the village of people who cut off heads". The village of Šťáhlavice was initially called Šťáhlavce (diminutive of Šťáhlavy), but the name was distorted to Šťáhlavice in the 17th century.

== Geography ==
Šťáhlavy is located about 14 kilometres (9 mi) southeast from Plzeň. It lies in the Švihov Highlands. The highest point is the hill Maršál at 562 m (1,844 ft) above sea level. The built-up area is situated on the left bank of the Úslava River.

== History ==
The first written mention of Šťáhlavy is from 1239. In 1784–1789, the Waldschloss Castle (later renamed Kozel Castle) was built. Šťahlavy was then owned by the Czernin family. In the 19th century, the estate was bought by the Waldstein family.

In 1947, Šťáhlavy was incorporated to Plzeň-Country District and in 1960 to the newly arisen Plzeň-South District. Since 1 January 2007, it has been a part of Plzeň-City District.

== Demographics ==
Historical population

Year	Pop.	±%
1869	1,437	—
1880	1,606	+11.8%
1890	1,620	+0.9%
1900	1,595	−1.5%
1910	1,624	+1.8%

Year	Pop.	±%
1921	1,776	+9.4%
1930	2,207	+24.3%
1950	2,065	−6.4%
1961	2,211	+7.1%
1970	2,161	−2.3%

Year	Pop.	±%
1980	2,289	+5.9%
1991	2,202	−3.8%
2001	2,165	−1.7%
2011	2,365	+9.2%
2021	2,923	+23.6%

Source: Censuses

== Transport ==
The I/19 road from Plzeň to Tábor briefly crosses the municipal territory.

Šťáhlavy is located on the railway line Plzeň–Horažďovice. In addition, there is a train stop is Šťáhlavice on a short line of local importance from Nezvěstice to Příkosice.

== Sights ==
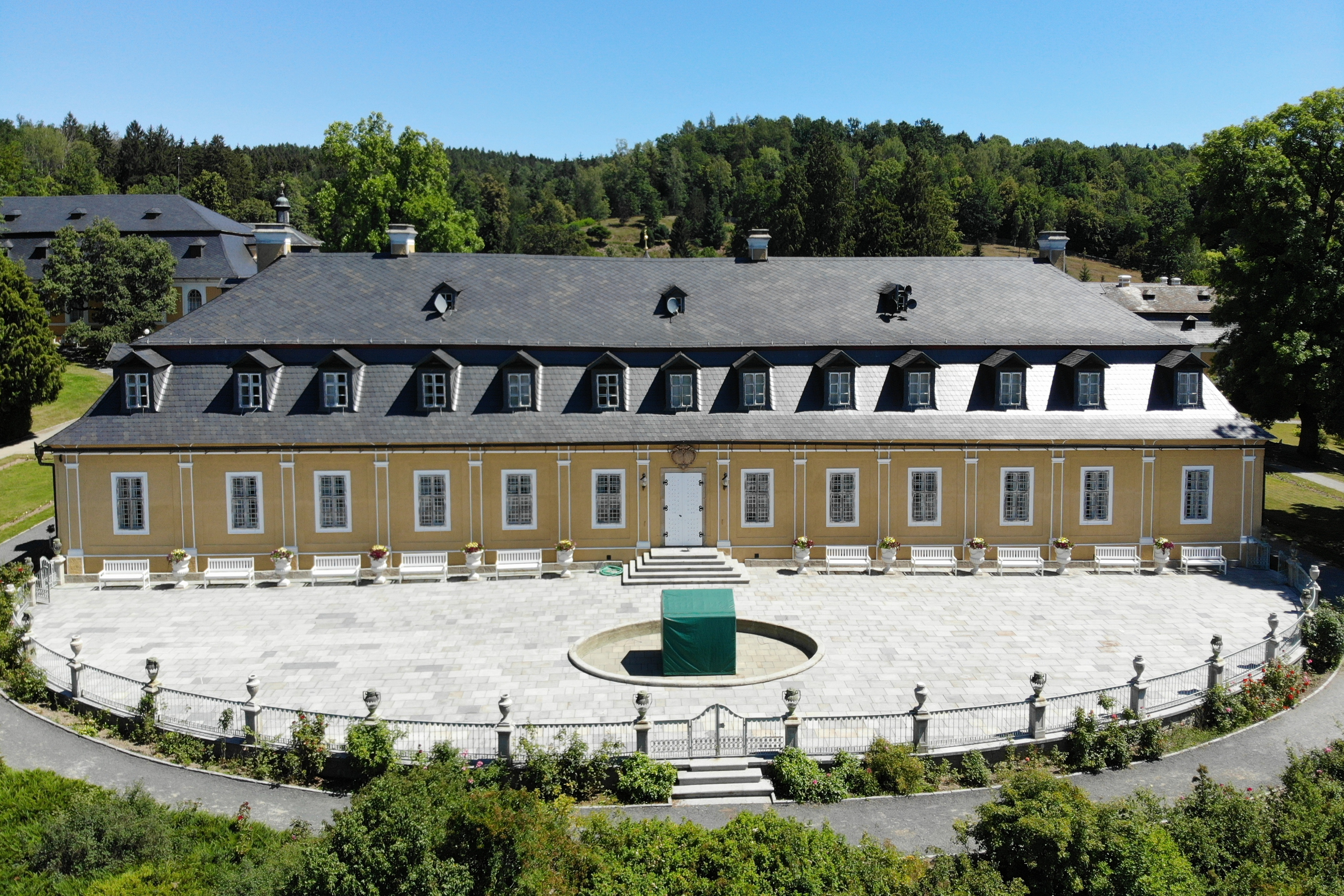
Kozel Castle

Šťáhlavy is known for two castles. Kozel Castle was built in the Neoclassical style in 1784–1789, as a rural aristocratic residence. Today it is open to the public and offers guided tours. The castle is surrounded by a large park, founded in 1875–1876. For its value, the castle complex is protected as a national cultural monument.

Šťáhlavy Castle was originally a fortress from the mid-16th century, later expanded into a Renaissance castle. The castle is privately owned and inaccessible.

== Notable people ==
- Jindřich Krepindl (born 1948), handball player
