= Letkov =

- Municipality
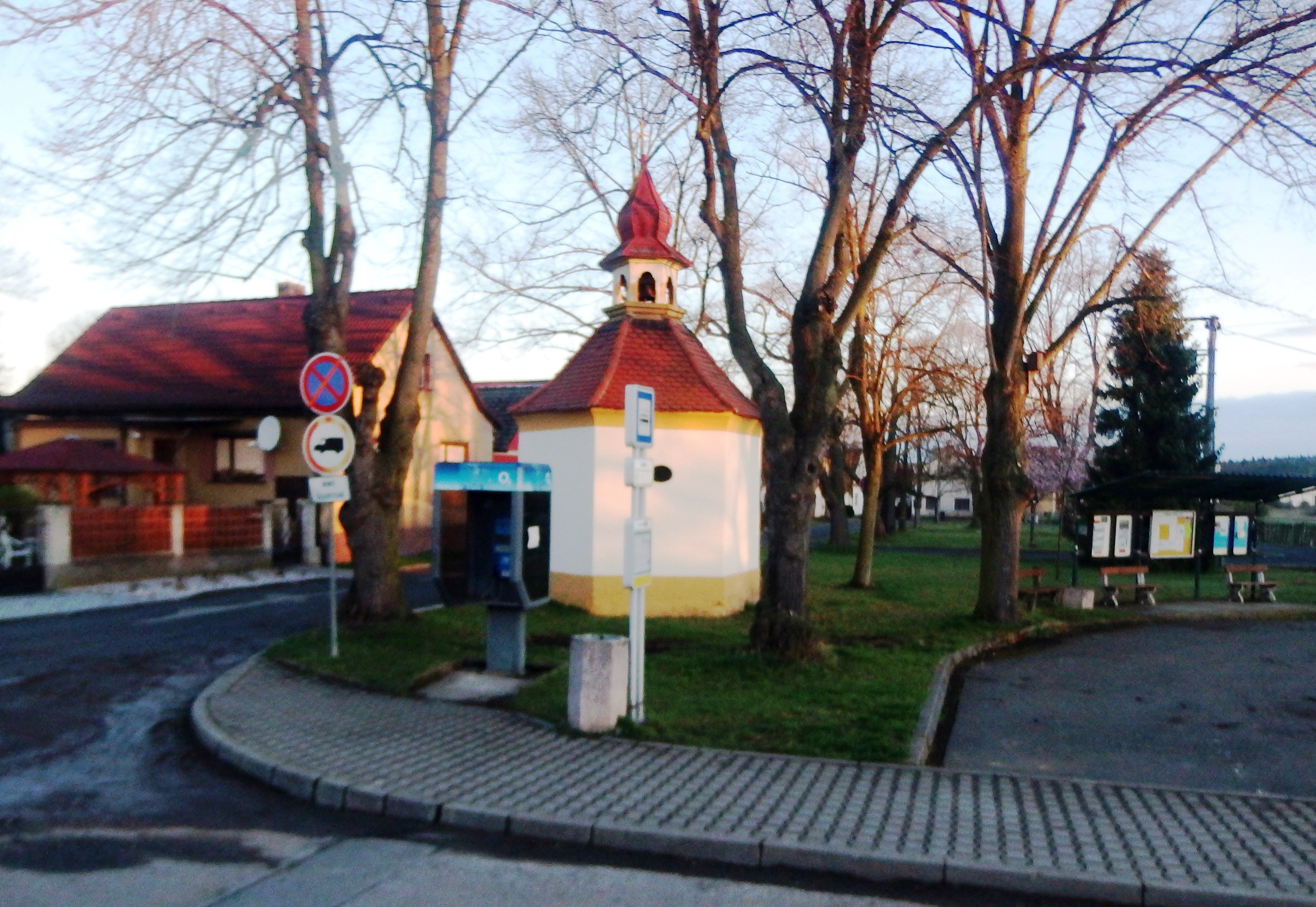
- Centre of Letkov

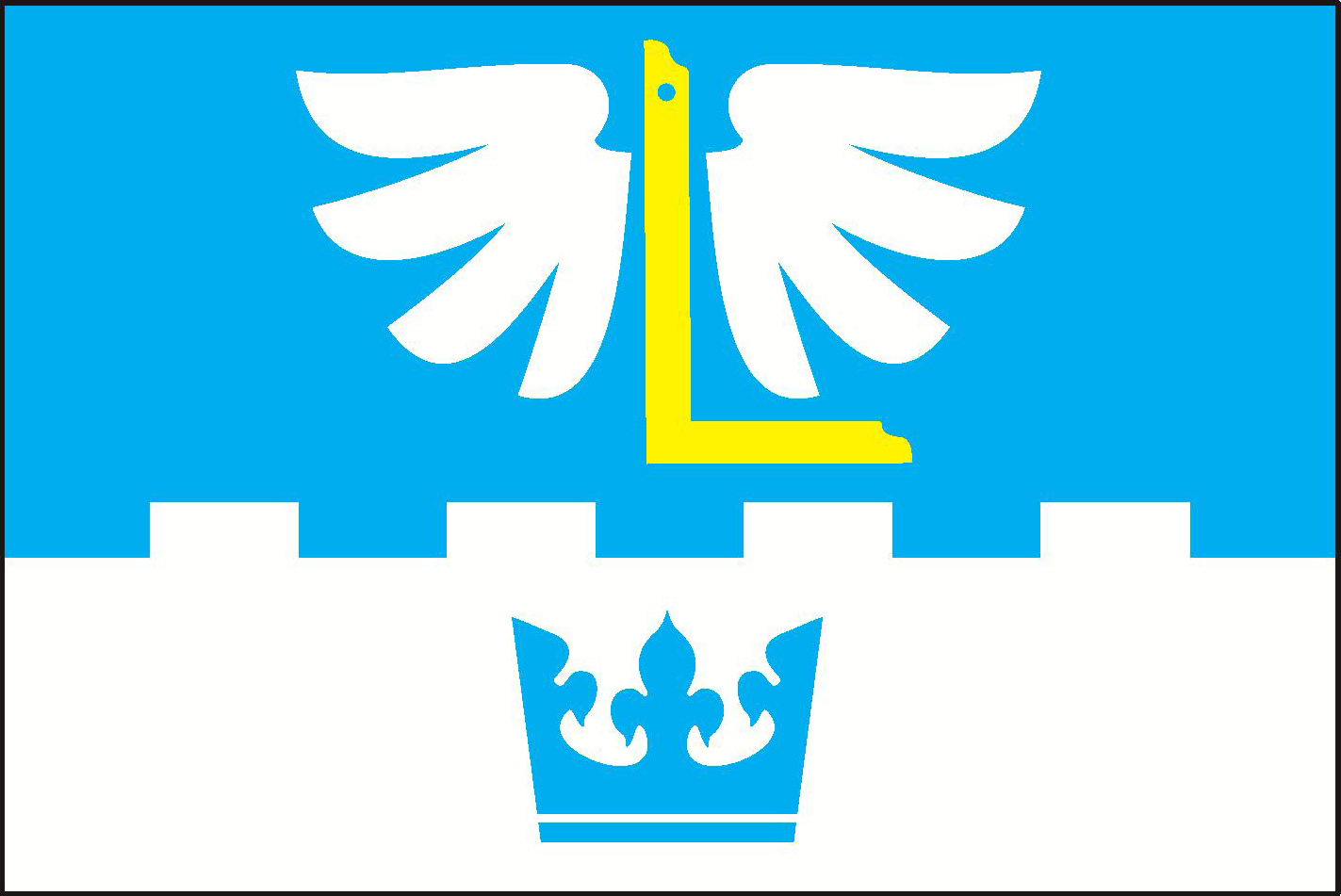
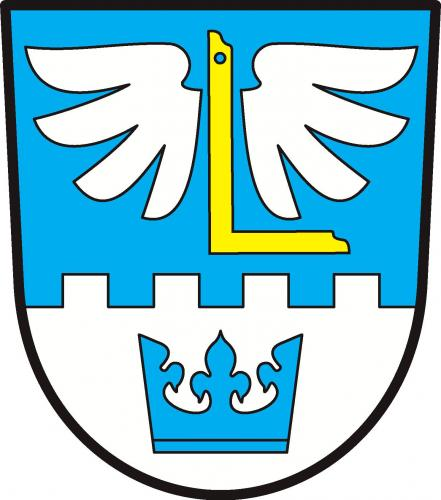
- Flag Coat of arms

- Location in the Czech Republic
- Coordinates: 49°43′47″N 13°27′58″E
- Country: Czech Republic
- Region: Plzeň
- District: Plzeň-City
- First mentioned: 1325

Area
  - Total: 4.71 km^{2} (1.82 sq mi)
- Elevation: 392 m (1,286 ft)

Population (2026-01-01)
  - Total: 918
  - Density: 195/km^{2} (505/sq mi)
- Time zone: UTC+1 (CET)
  - Summer (DST): UTC+2 (CEST)
- Postal code: 326 00
- Website: www.obec-letkov.cz

Letkov is a municipality and village in Plzeň-City District in the Plzeň Region of the Czech Republic. It has about 900 inhabitants.

Letkov lies approximately 7 kilometres (4 mi) east of Plzeň and 80 km (50 mi) south-west of Prague.

== Demographics ==
Historical population
Year	Pop.	±%
1869	208	—
1880	239	+14.9%
1890	292	+22.2%
1900	318	+8.9%
1910	388	+22.0%
1921	408	+5.2%
1930	453	+11.0%
1950	356	−21.4%
1961	359	+0.8%
1970	341	−5.0%
1980	343	+0.6%
1991	290	−15.5%
2001	316	+9.0%
2011	627	+98.4%
2021	835	+33.2%
Source: Censuses
