= Chrást (Plzeň-City District) =

- Municipality
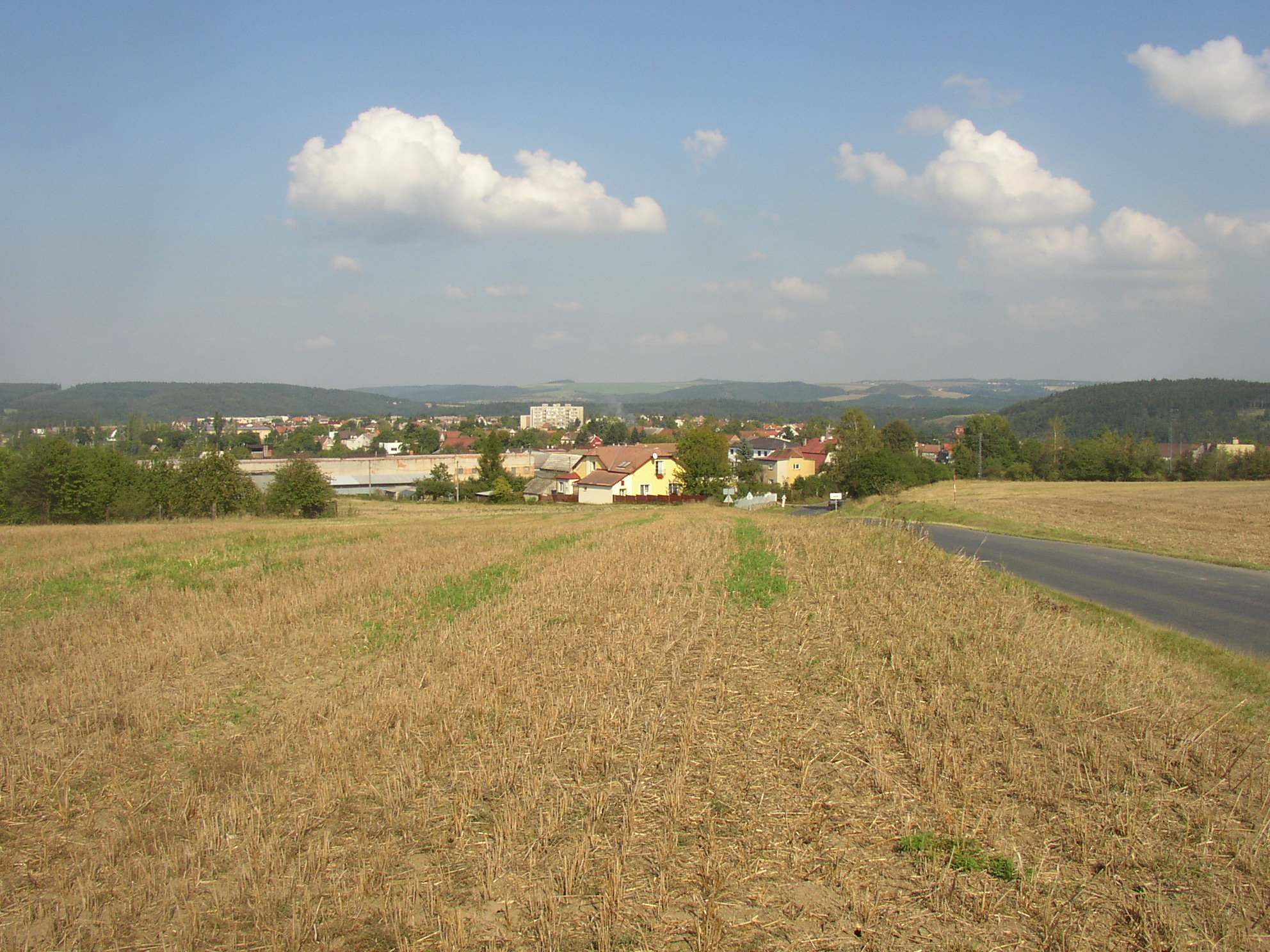
- View from the southwest

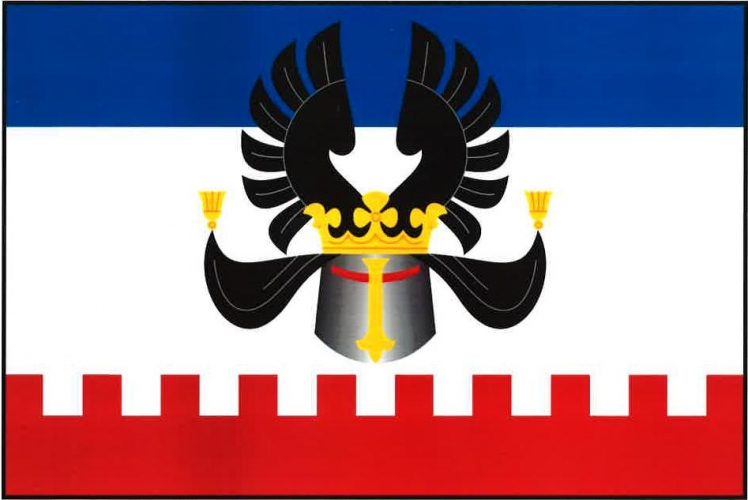
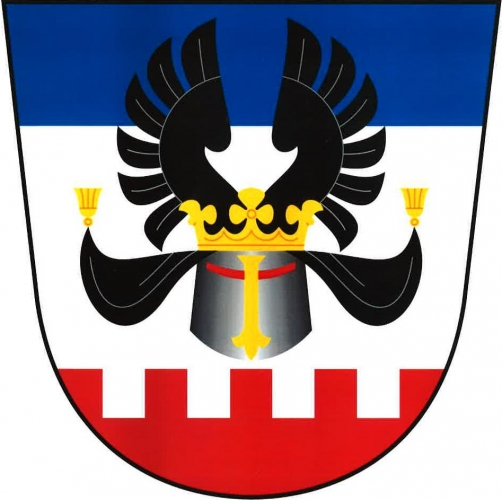
- Flag Coat of arms

- Location in the Czech Republic
- Coordinates: 49°47′47″N 13°29′31″E
- Country: Czech Republic
- Region: Plzeň
- District: Plzeň-City
- First mentioned: 1242

Area
  - Total: 9.84 km^{2} (3.80 sq mi)
- Elevation: 342 m (1,122 ft)

Population (2026-01-01)
  - Total: 1,912
  - Density: 194/km^{2} (503/sq mi)
- Time zone: UTC+1 (CET)
  - Summer (DST): UTC+2 (CEST)
- Postal code: 330 03
- Website: www.obecchrast.cz

Chrást is a municipality and village in Plzeň-City District in the Plzeň Region of the Czech Republic. It has about 1,900 inhabitants.

== Etymology ==
The name Chrást is a common Czech place name, meaning 'brushwood' or 'shrubs'.

== Geography ==
Chrást is located about 9 kilometres (6 mi) northeast of Plzeň. It lies in the Plasy Uplands. The highest point is the hill Chlum at 412 m (1,352 ft) above sea level. The municipality is situated on the right bank of the Berounka River, which flows along the northern municipal border. The Klabava River flows along the eastern municipal border and then joins the Berounka.

== History ==
The first written mention of Chrást is in a deed of King Wenceslaus I from 1242. Until 1434, the village was owned by a family that called themselves Lords of Chrást. Between 1434 and 1514, the owners of Chrást often changed. In 1514, the village was acquired by the city of Plzeň.

== Demographics ==
Historical population

Year	Pop.	±%
1869	742	—
1880	817	+10.1%
1890	949	+16.2%
1900	1,185	+24.9%
1910	1,489	+25.7%

Year	Pop.	±%
1921	1,557	+4.6%
1930	2,000	+28.5%
1950	1,751	−12.5%
1961	1,950	+11.4%
1970	1,864	−4.4%

Year	Pop.	±%
1980	1,825	−2.1%
1991	1,680	−7.9%
2001	1,677	−0.2%
2011	1,868	+11.4%
2021	1,886	+1.0%

Source: Censuses

== Transport ==
Chrást is located on the railway line Radnice–Bezdružice via Plzeň.

== Sights ==
The most valuable building of Chrást is Jílek's Watermill. It is a villa with Art Nouveau and Cubist elements, dating from 1920. Other parts of the area (mill building and barns) date from the second half of the 19th century. The mill contains partially preserved original technical equipment.
