= Tymákov =

- Municipality
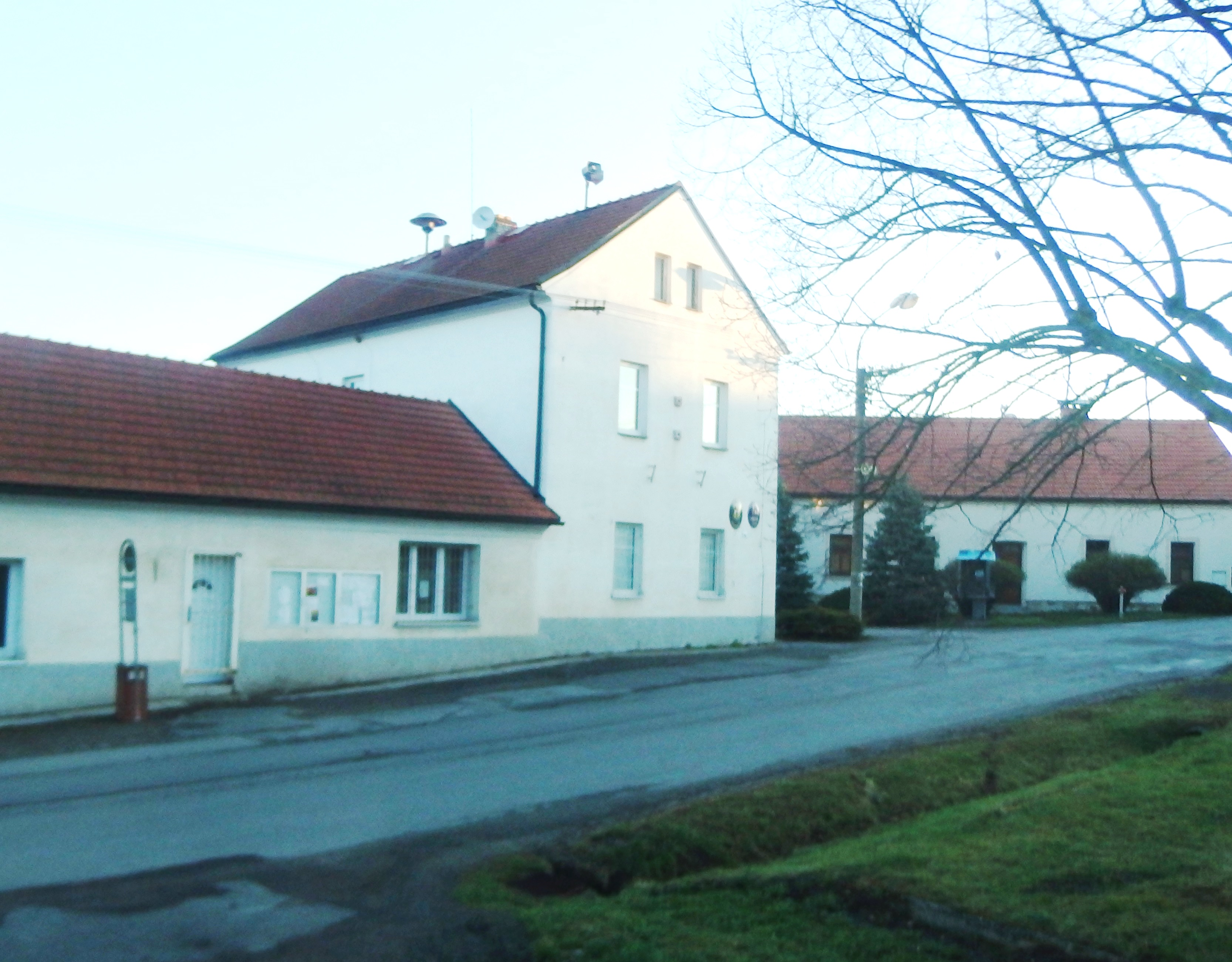
- Municipal office

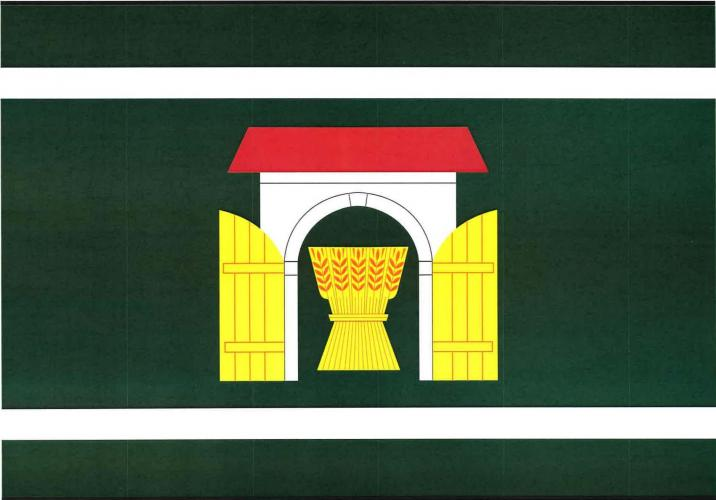
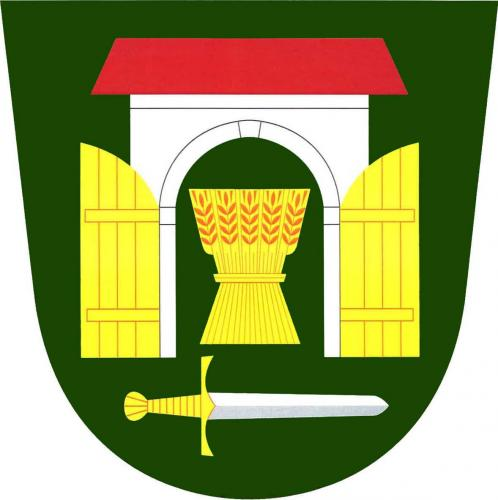
- Flag Coat of arms

- Location in the Czech Republic
- Coordinates: 49°43′0″N 13°30′38″E
- Country: Czech Republic
- Region: Plzeň
- District: Plzeň-City
- First mentioned: 1379

Area
  - Total: 9.11 km^{2} (3.52 sq mi)
- Elevation: 398 m (1,306 ft)

Population (2026-01-01)
  - Total: 1,089
  - Density: 120/km^{2} (310/sq mi)
- Time zone: UTC+1 (CET)
  - Summer (DST): UTC+2 (CEST)
- Postal code: 332 01
- Website: www.tymakov.cz

Tymákov is a municipality and village in Plzeň-City District in the Plzeň Region of the Czech Republic. It has about 1,100 inhabitants.

Tymákov lies approximately 11 kilometres (7 mi) east of Plzeň and 78 km (48 mi) south-west of Prague.

== Demographics ==
Historical population
Year	Pop.	±%
1869	889	—
1880	941	+5.8%
1890	966	+2.7%
1900	962	−0.4%
1910	972	+1.0%
1921	956	−1.6%
1930	1,020	+6.7%
1950	865	−15.2%
1961	916	+5.9%
1970	830	−9.4%
1980	745	−10.2%
1991	666	−10.6%
2001	658	−1.2%
2011	848	+28.9%
2021	1,084	+27.8%
Source: Censuses
