= Mokrouše =

- Municipality
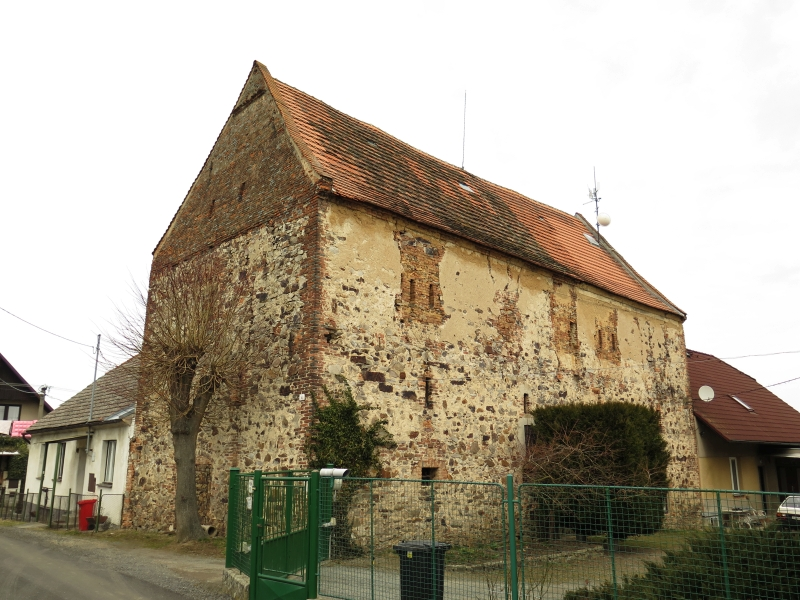
- Old granary in Mokrouše

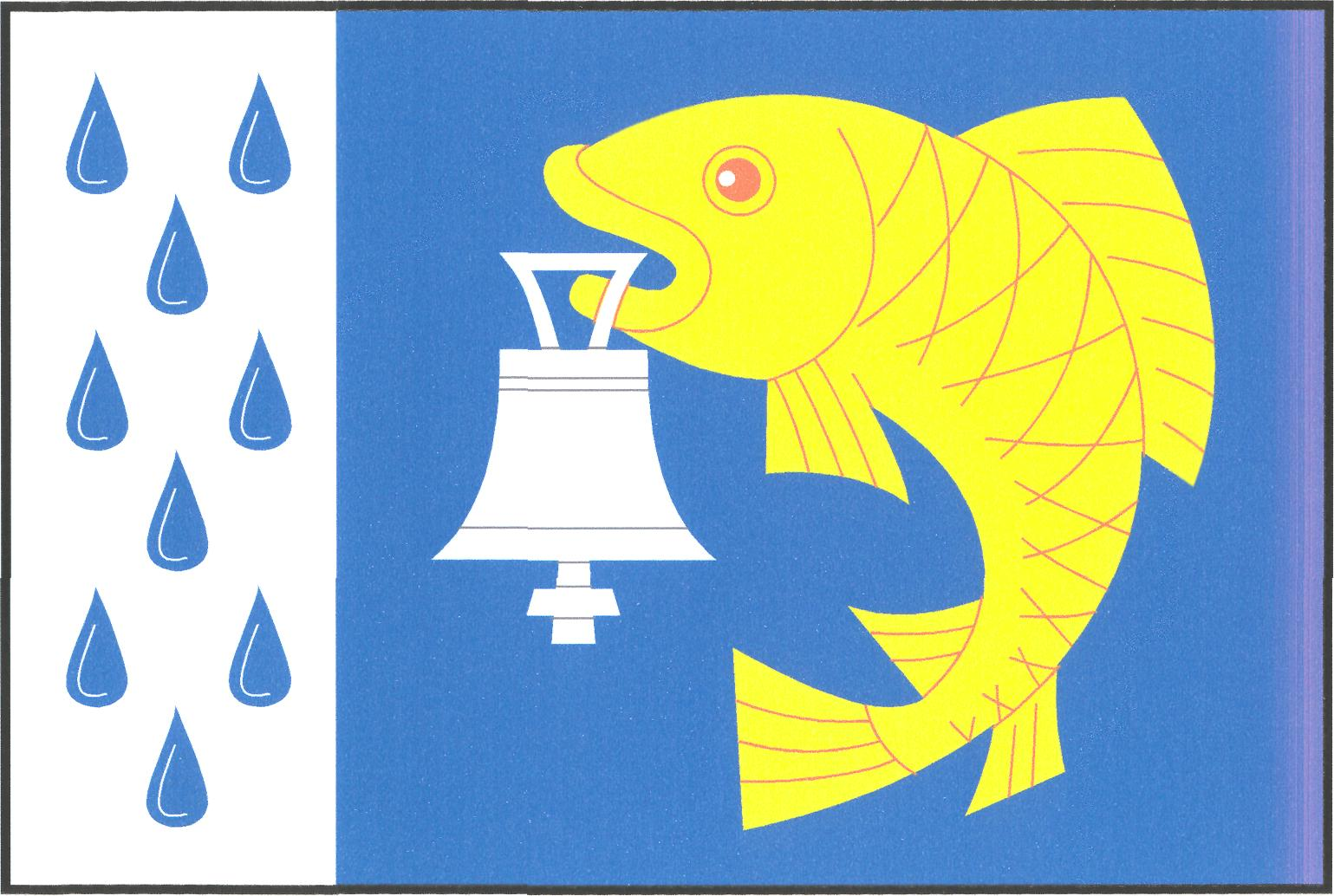
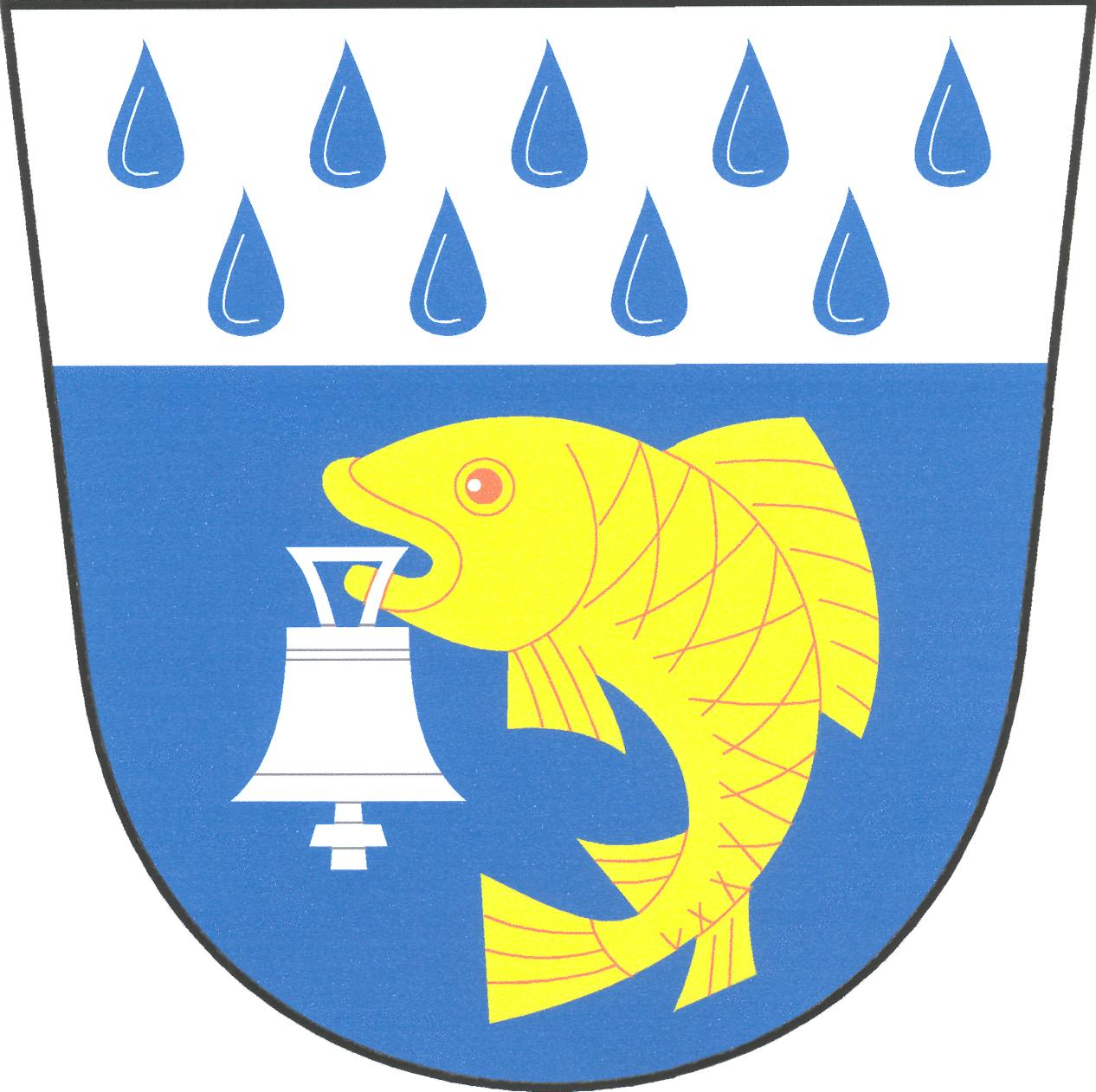
- Flag Coat of arms

- Location in the Czech Republic
- Coordinates: 49°42′54″N 13°31′28″E
- Country: Czech Republic
- Region: Plzeň
- District: Plzeň-City
- First mentioned: 1379

Area
  - Total: 2.74 km^{2} (1.06 sq mi)
- Elevation: 398 m (1,306 ft)

Population (2026-01-01)
  - Total: 352
  - Density: 128/km^{2} (333/sq mi)
- Time zone: UTC+1 (CET)
  - Summer (DST): UTC+2 (CEST)
- Postal code: 332 01
- Website: www.mokrouse.cz

Mokrouše is a municipality and village in Plzeň-City District in the Plzeň Region of the Czech Republic. It has about 400 inhabitants.

Mokrouše lies approximately 12 kilometres (7 mi) east of Plzeň and 77 km (48 mi) south-west of Prague.

== Demographics ==
Historical population
Year	Pop.	±%
1869	292	—
1880	320	+9.6%
1890	290	−9.4%
1900	265	−8.6%
1910	313	+18.1%
1921	265	−15.3%
1930	235	−11.3%
1950	193	−17.9%
1961	202	+4.7%
1970	178	−11.9%
1980	137	−23.0%
1991	109	−20.4%
2001	146	+33.9%
2011	210	+43.8%
2021	317	+51.0%
Source: Censuses
