= Chválenice =

- Municipality
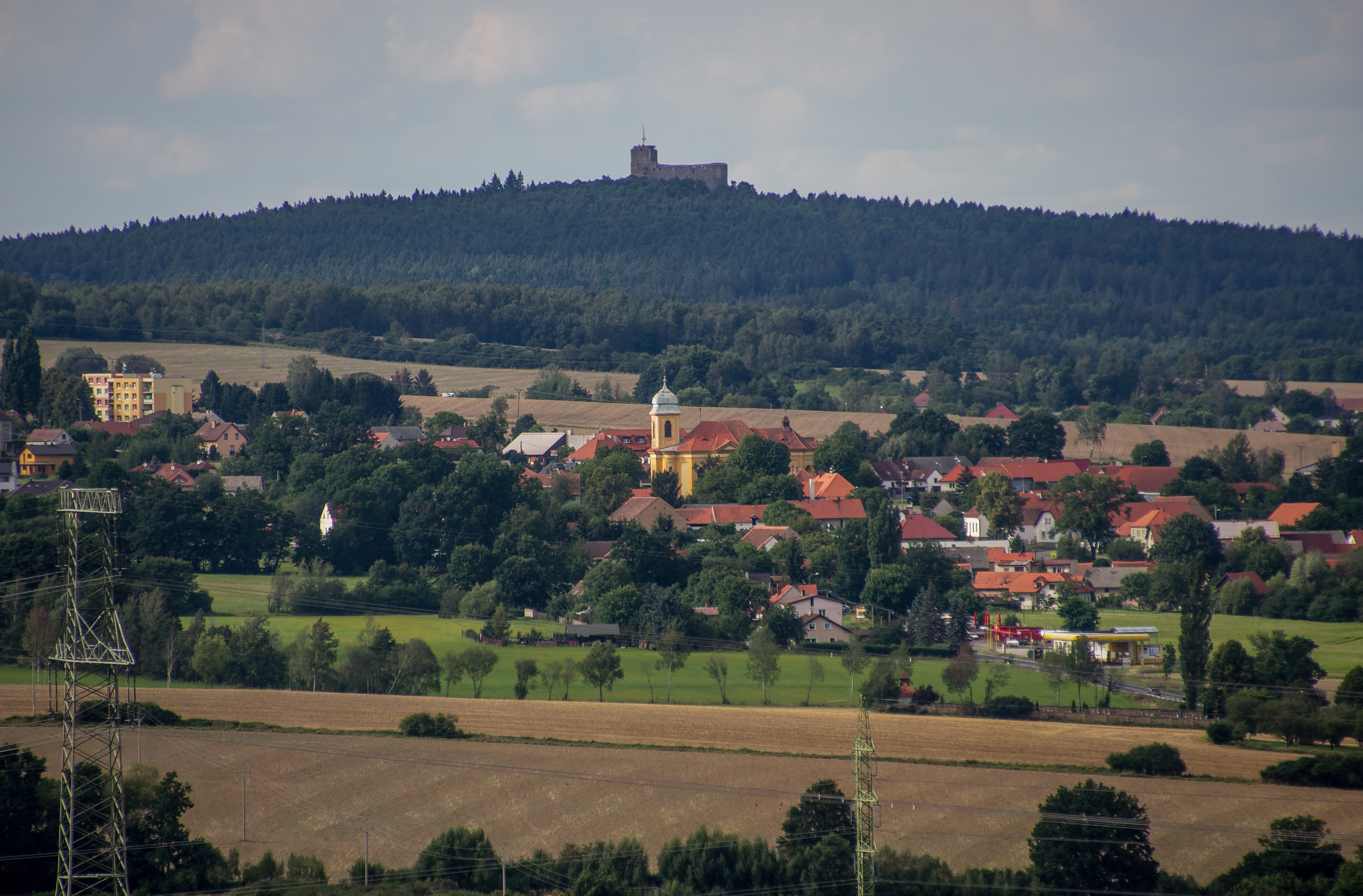
- General view of Chválenice

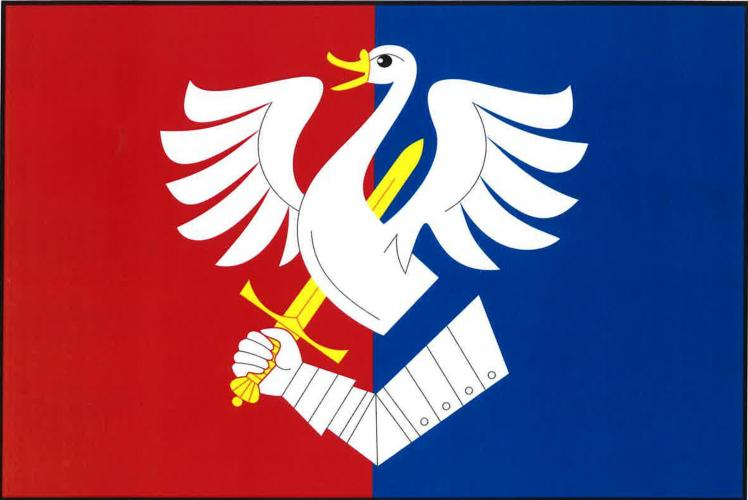
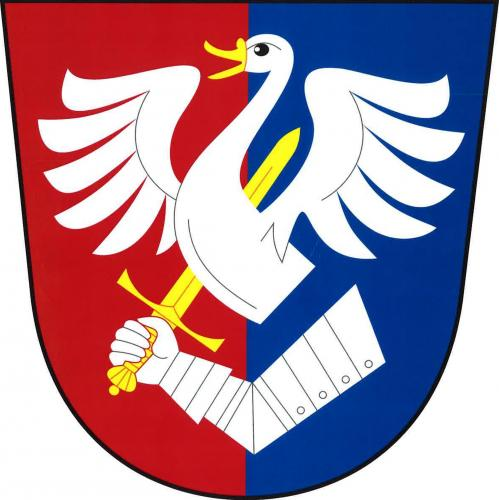
- Flag Coat of arms

- Location in the Czech Republic
- Coordinates: 49°38′45″N 13°28′27″E
- Country: Czech Republic
- Region: Plzeň
- District: Plzeň-City
- First mentioned: 1242

Area
  - Total: 9.92 km^{2} (3.83 sq mi)
- Elevation: 455 m (1,493 ft)

Population (2026-01-01)
  - Total: 762
  - Density: 76.8/km^{2} (199/sq mi)
- Time zone: UTC+1 (CET)
  - Summer (DST): UTC+2 (CEST)
- Postal codes: 332 04, 332 05
- Website: www.chvalenice.cz

Chválenice is a municipality and village in Plzeň-City District in the Plzeň Region of the Czech Republic. It has about 800 inhabitants.

Chválenice lies approximately 14 kilometres (9 mi) south-east of Plzeň and 84 km (52 mi) south-west of Prague.

== Administrative division ==
Chválenice consists of three municipal parts (in brackets population according to the 2021 census):

- Chválenice (620)
- Chouzovy (62)
- Želčany (83)

== Demographics ==
Historical population
Year	Pop.	±%
1869	679	—
1880	691	+1.8%
1890	670	−3.0%
1900	684	+2.1%
1910	686	+0.3%
1921	699	+1.9%
1930	742	+6.2%
1950	589	−20.6%
1961	570	−3.2%
1970	488	−14.4%
1980	486	−0.4%
1991	510	+4.9%
2001	521	+2.2%
2011	658	+26.3%
2021	765	+16.3%
Source: Censuses
