= Nezbavětice =

- Municipality
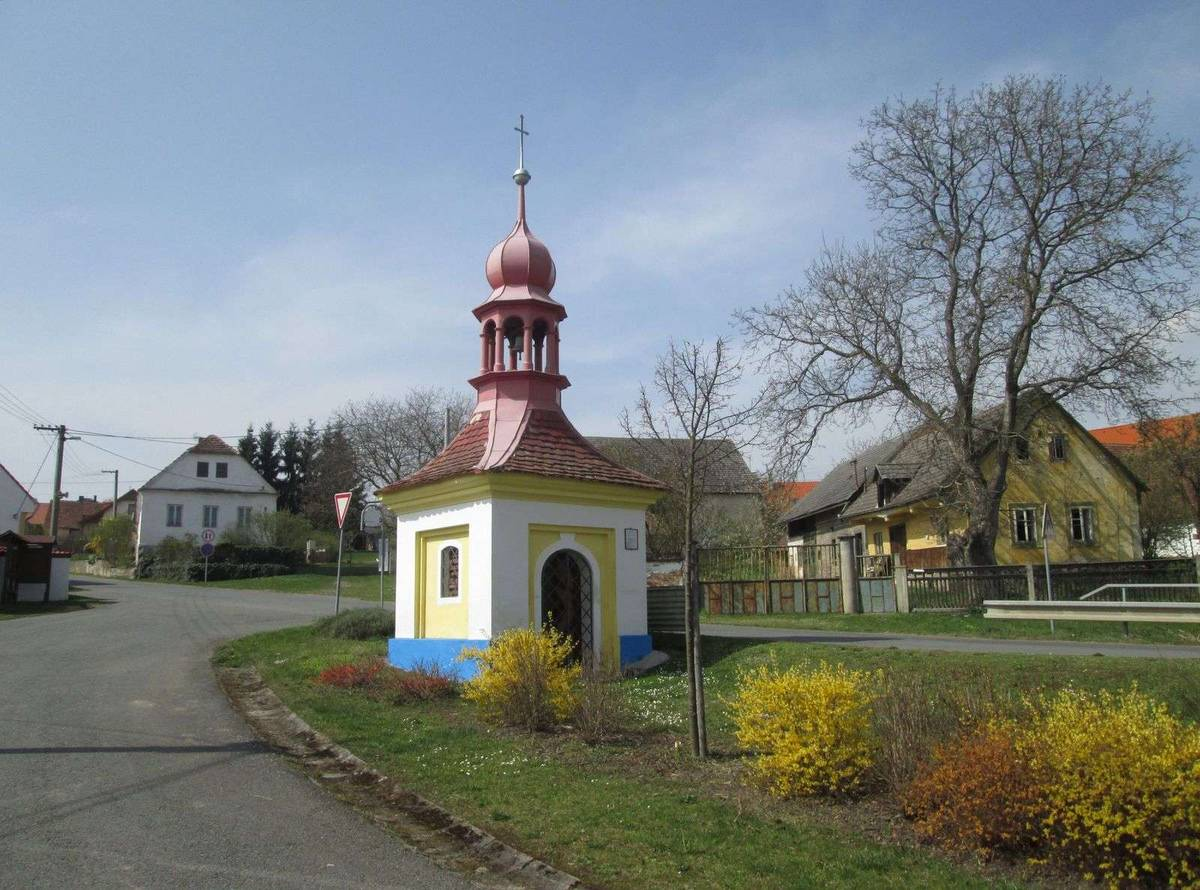
- Centre of Nezbavětice

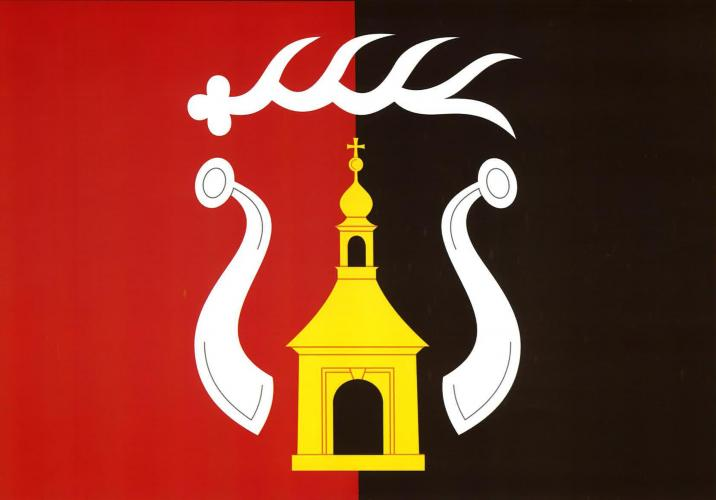
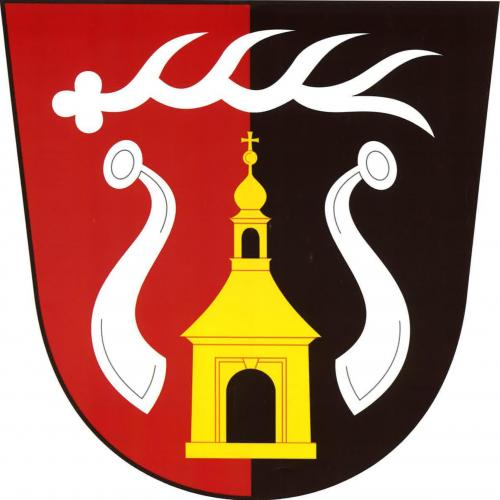
- Flag Coat of arms

- Location in the Czech Republic
- Coordinates: 49°39′18″N 13°28′37″E
- Country: Czech Republic
- Region: Plzeň
- District: Plzeň-City
- First mentioned: 1379

Area
  - Total: 4.75 km^{2} (1.83 sq mi)
- Elevation: 444 m (1,457 ft)

Population (2026-01-01)
  - Total: 263
  - Density: 55.4/km^{2} (143/sq mi)
- Time zone: UTC+1 (CET)
  - Summer (DST): UTC+2 (CEST)
- Postal code: 332 04
- Website: www.nezbavetice.cz

Nezbavětice is a municipality and village in Plzeň-City District in the Plzeň Region of the Czech Republic. It has about 300 inhabitants.

Nezbavětice lies approximately 13 kilometres (8 mi) south-east of Plzeň and 83 km (52 mi) south-west of Prague.

== Demographics ==
Historical population
Year	Pop.	±%
1869	268	—
1880	260	−3.0%
1890	261	+0.4%
1900	304	+16.5%
1910	298	−2.0%
1921	300	+0.7%
1930	286	−4.7%
1950	240	−16.1%
1961	264	+10.0%
1970	209	−20.8%
1980	180	−13.9%
1991	167	−7.2%
2001	181	+8.4%
2011	215	+18.8%
2021	243	+13.0%
Source: Censuses
