= Štěnovický Borek =

- Municipality
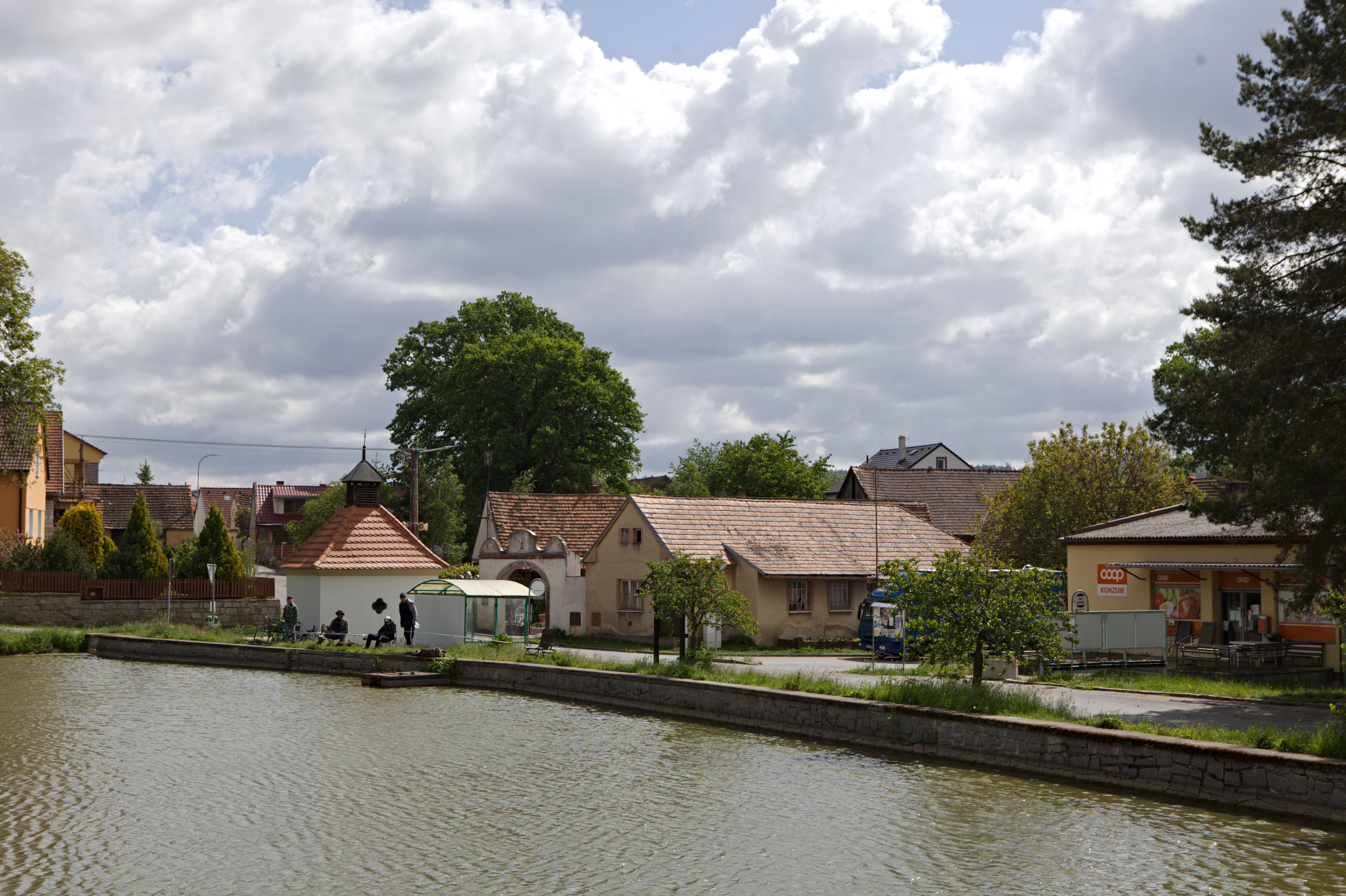
- Centre of Štěnovický Borek

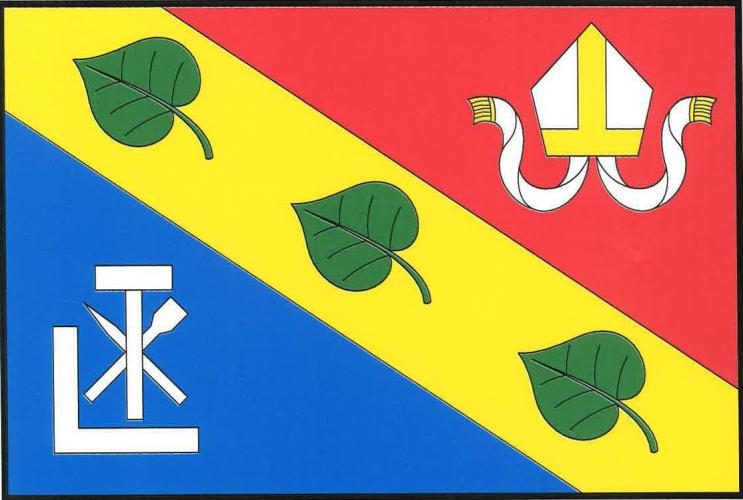
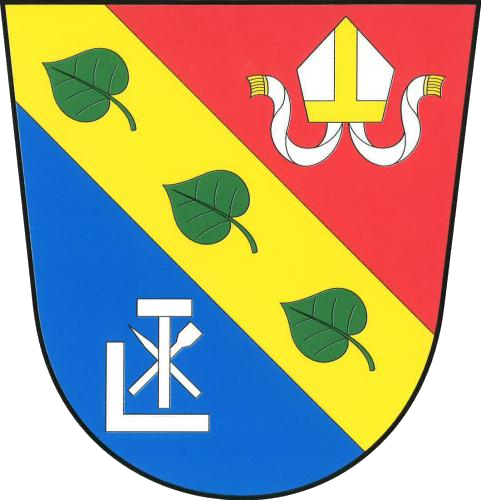
- Flag Coat of arms

- Location in the Czech Republic
- Coordinates: 49°38′59″N 13°25′36″E
- Country: Czech Republic
- Region: Plzeň
- District: Plzeň-City
- First mentioned: 1379

Area
  - Total: 6.23 km^{2} (2.41 sq mi)
- Elevation: 412 m (1,352 ft)

Population (2026-01-01)
  - Total: 629
  - Density: 101/km^{2} (261/sq mi)
- Time zone: UTC+1 (CET)
  - Summer (DST): UTC+2 (CEST)
- Postal code: 332 09
- Website: www.stenovickyborek.cz

Štěnovický Borek is a municipality and village in Plzeň-City District in the Plzeň Region of the Czech Republic. It has about 600 inhabitants.

Štěnovický Borek lies approximately 12 kilometres (7 mi) south of Plzeň and 87 km (54 mi) south-west of Prague.

== Administrative division ==
Štěnovický Borek consists of two municipal parts (in brackets population according to the 2021 census):

- Štěnovický Borek (329)
- Nebílovský Borek (309)

== Demographics ==
Historical population
Year	Pop.	±%
1869	478	—
1880	448	−6.3%
1890	454	+1.3%
1900	463	+2.0%
1910	493	+6.5%
1921	479	−2.8%
1930	502	+4.8%
1950	398	−20.7%
1961	429	+7.8%
1970	407	−5.1%
1980	322	−20.9%
1991	304	−5.6%
2001	303	−0.3%
2011	501	+65.3%
2021	638	+27.3%
Source: Censuses
