= Kyšice (Plzeň-City District) =

- Municipality
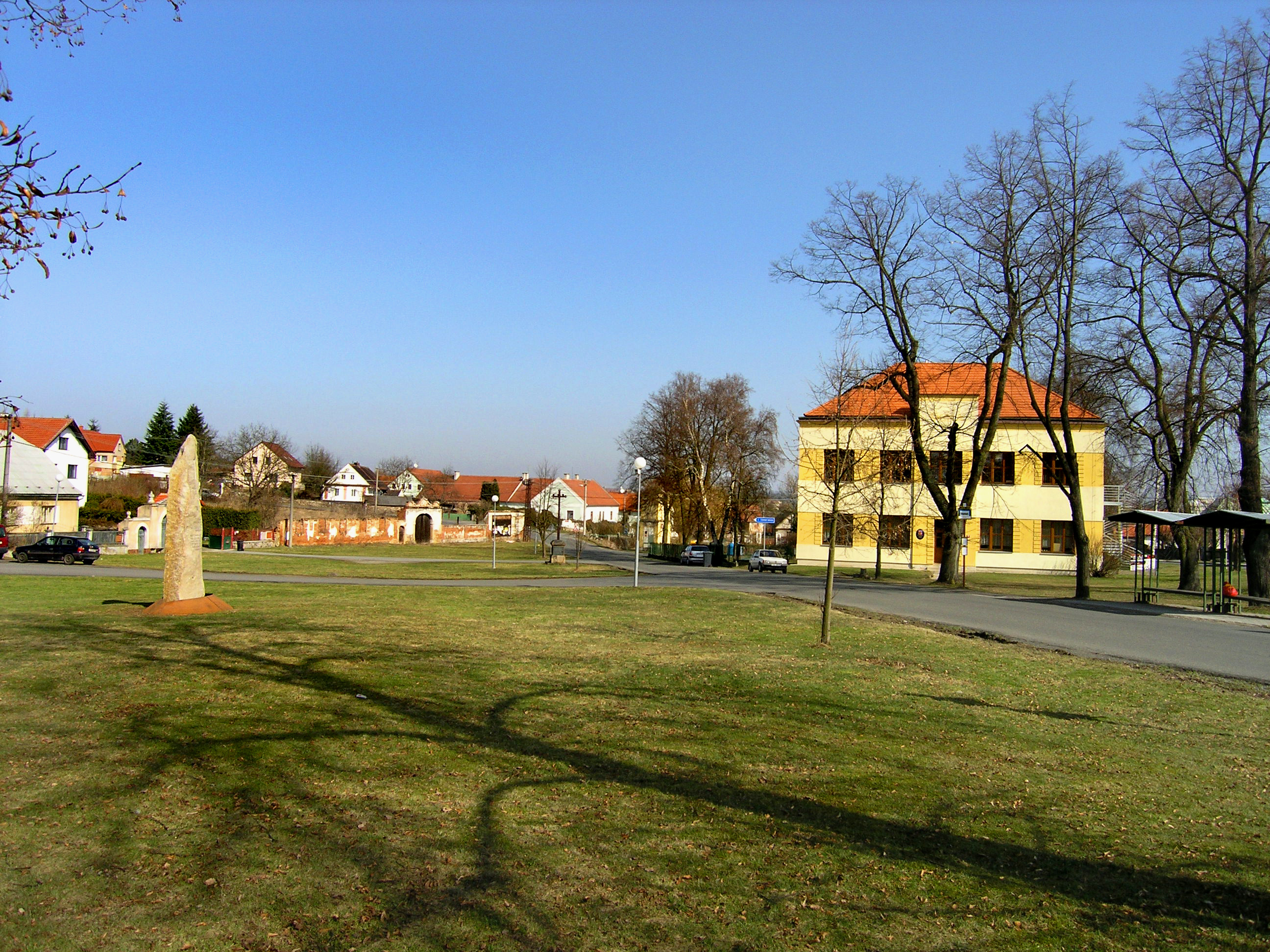
- Centre of Kyšice

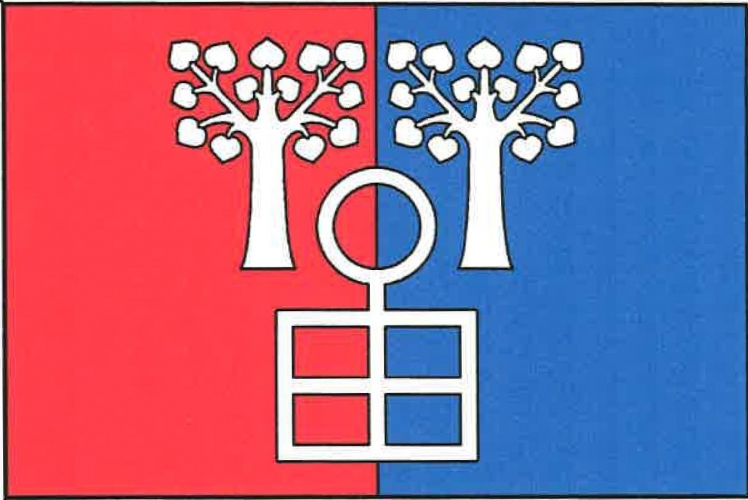
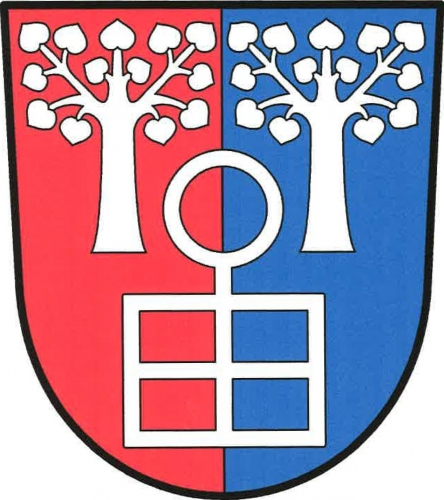
- Flag Coat of arms

- Location in the Czech Republic
- Coordinates: 49°45′11″N 13°29′10″E
- Country: Czech Republic
- Region: Plzeň
- District: Plzeň-City
- First mentioned: 1336

Area
  - Total: 7.07 km^{2} (2.73 sq mi)
- Elevation: 387 m (1,270 ft)

Population (2026-01-01)
  - Total: 1,148
  - Density: 162/km^{2} (421/sq mi)
- Time zone: UTC+1 (CET)
  - Summer (DST): UTC+2 (CEST)
- Postal code: 330 01
- Website: www.kysice.eu

Kyšice is a municipality and village in Plzeň-City District in the Plzeň Region of the Czech Republic. It has about 1,100 inhabitants.

== Etymology ==
The name is derived from the personal name Kych, meaning "the village of Kych's people".

== Geography ==
Kyšice is located about 7 kilometres (4 mi) east of Plzeň. It lies mostly in the Švihov Highlands, but it also extends into the Plasy Uplands in the north. The highest point is the hill Na Pohodnici at 499 m (1,637 ft) above sea level. The Klabava River crosses the municipal territory in the northeast.

== History ==
The first written mention of Kyšice is from 1336.

== Demographics ==
Historical population

Year	Pop.	±%
1869	544	—
1880	552	+1.5%
1890	639	+15.8%
1900	635	−0.6%
1910	773	+21.7%

Year	Pop.	±%
1921	816	+5.6%
1930	851	+4.3%
1950	743	−12.7%
1961	778	+4.7%
1970	699	−10.2%

Year	Pop.	±%
1980	616	−11.9%
1991	626	+1.6%
2001	712	+13.7%
2011	873	+22.6%
2021	1,059	+21.3%

Source: Censuses

== Transport ==
The railway line Plzeň–Beroun passes through the municipality, but there is no train station.

== Sights ==
The historic centre of the village is well preserved and is protected as a village monument zone. It consists of many examples of folk Neoclassical architecture. The main landmark is a Neoclassical chapel from 1827.
