= Nezvěstice =

- Municipality
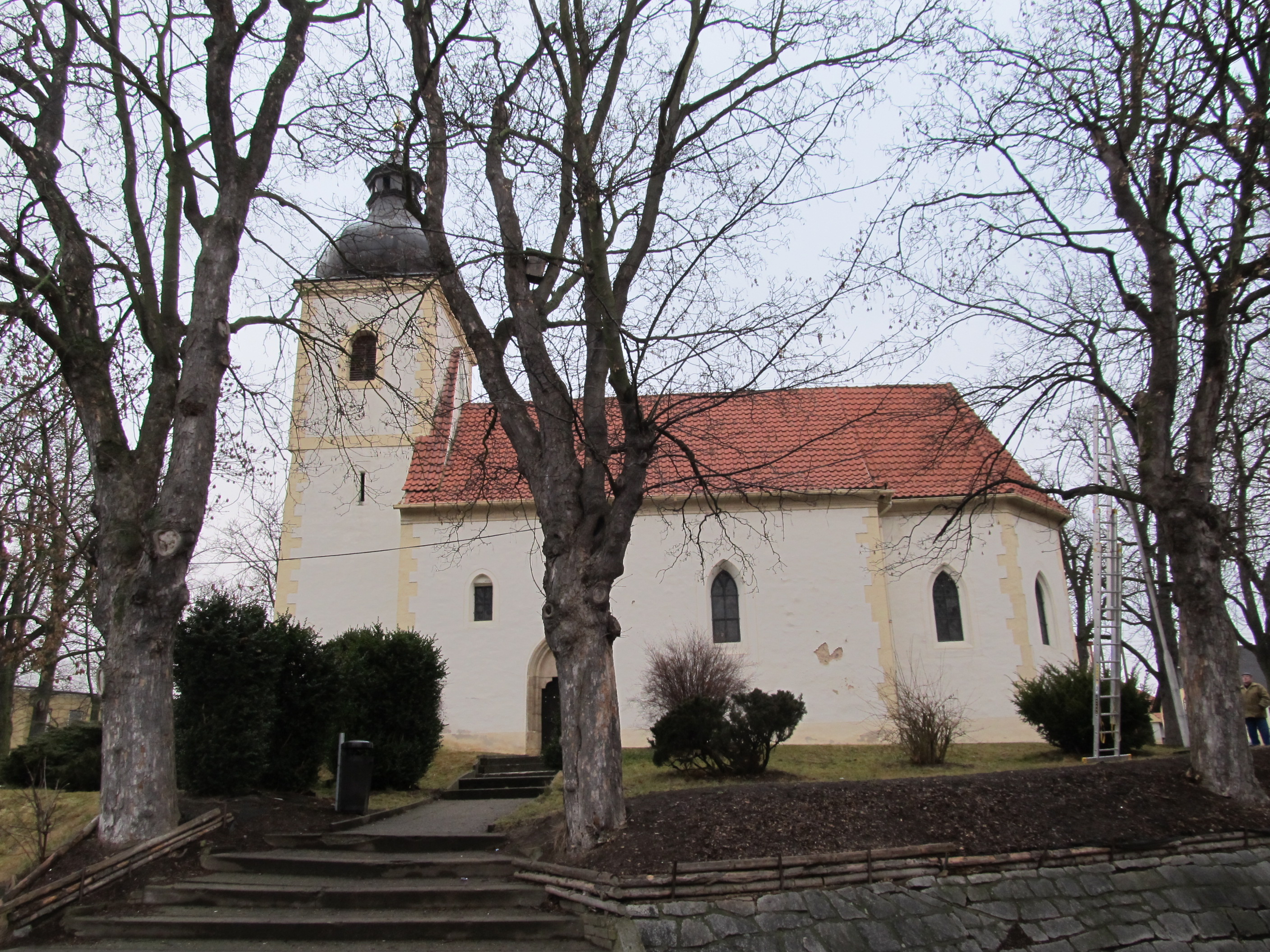
- Church of All Saints

- Flag Coat of arms

- Location in the Czech Republic
- Coordinates: 49°38′31″N 13°31′11″E
- Country: Czech Republic
- Region: Plzeň
- District: Plzeň-City
- First mentioned: 1350

Area
  - Total: 6.44 km^{2} (2.49 sq mi)
- Elevation: 375 m (1,230 ft)

Population (2026-01-01)
  - Total: 1,461
  - Density: 227/km^{2} (588/sq mi)
- Time zone: UTC+1 (CET)
  - Summer (DST): UTC+2 (CEST)
- Postal code: 332 04
- Website: www.nezvestice.cz

Nezvěstice is a municipality and village in Plzeň-City District in the Plzeň Region of the Czech Republic. It has about 1,500 inhabitants.

Nezvěstice lies approximately 16 kilometres (10 mi) south-east of Plzeň and 82 km (51 mi) south-west of Prague.

== Administrative division ==
Nezvěstice consists of two municipal parts (in brackets population according to the 2021 census):

- Nezvěstice (1,137)
- Olešná (281)

== Demographics ==
Historical population
Year	Pop.	±%
1869	526	—
1880	563	+7.0%
1890	585	+3.9%
1900	613	+4.8%
1910	694	+13.2%
1921	785	+13.1%
1930	1,076	+37.1%
1950	1,172	+8.9%
1961	1,243	+6.1%
1970	1,262	+1.5%
1980	1,350	+7.0%
1991	1,425	+5.6%
2001	1,356	−4.8%
2011	1,459	+7.6%
2021	1,418	−2.8%
Source: Censuses
