= Lasselsberger =

Austrian building materials company

Lasselsberger Group
- Type: Public company
- Industry: Building materials industry
- Founded: 1957
- Headquarters: Pöchlarn
- Number of employees: 5,000+
- Website: www.lasselsberger.com/en/

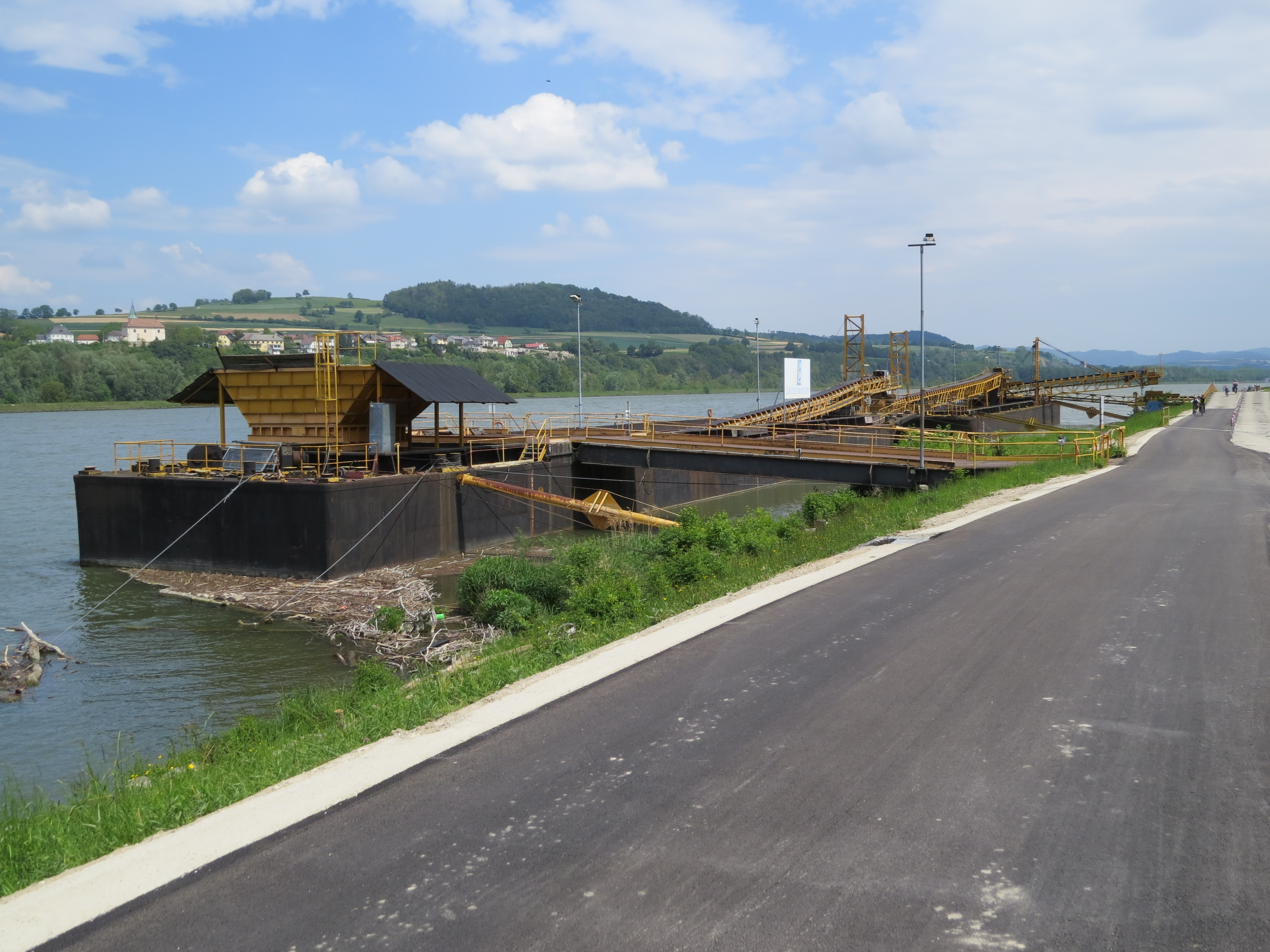
Plant of Lasselsberger in Pöchlarn, Austria

The Lasselsberger Group is an international producer of raw materials, building materials and tiles based in Pöchlarn, Austria. Both local home markets and international markets – especially in Western Europe - are supplied from the production sites in Central and Eastern Europe. The subsidiaries of the three divisions Ceramics, Building Materials and Minerals as well as the local organizations are managed and coordinated from Pöchlarn. The term "Lasselsberger Group" represents the umbrella term for all corporate components of Lasselsberger GmbH.

The Lasselsberger Group was founded in 1957 as a sand and gravel company by Anton Lasselsberger Senior and the first concrete plant in Pöchlarn went into operation in 1967.

After the fall of the Iron Curtain, the Lasselsberger Group was one of the first companies to enter the market in the former Eastern Bloc countries. The first step was taken in 1990 with the start of the first business activities (sand and gravel) in Hungary and the founding of Lasselsberger-Knauf Kft. as a 50:50 joint venture with the German Knauf Group for the Hungarian building materials market. Subsequently, from 1993, international trading and transport activities were started in Malta, business activities in Hungary were expanded through the acquisition of raw materials and building materials companies, and the Slovak market was opened. In 1997, the product portfolio was further expanded with the entry into the Romanian cement business.

At the end of the 1990s, leading ceramics producers in the Czech Republic, which also had sites for mining raw materials, were privatized. In this context, the takeover of leading ceramics groups in the Czech Republic (Keramika Horni Briza, Chlumcanske keramicke and Rako) took place in 1998.

The positive economic development of the company in the ceramics industry enabled the further expansion of sales activities and the acquisition of additional production sites in Hungary, Romania, and Slovakia. In addition, the Hungarian Zalakeramia Group and the Romanian ceramics producer Cesarom were taken over.

After the acquisition of numerous companies in Central and Eastern Europe, a divisional structure was introduced within the group in 2006 and the companies were assigned to the three divisions Ceramics, Minerals and Building Materials. This was also linked to the strategic decision to focus on the core business - raw materials, building materials, tiles - and to sell all parts of the company that are not part of the core business (e.g., the porcelain manufacturer Inker Trogornia).

In the following years, business expansion on the Eurasian market was prepared by first establishing a branch in Moscow and then building a state-of-the-art tile production facility in Ufa. The branch network in Romania was also expanded in order to further expand the Marktposition.

Since 2015, the focus has been on investments in existing locations such as modernization and improving energy efficiency. In addition, companies were selectively taken over and further investments were made in the Eurasian market. In 2018 there were further acquisitions of a Hungarian sand and gravel company, an expansion of the Lasselsberger-Knauf Kft. joint venture and the founding of subsidiaries in China and Australia.

The Lasselsberger Group is a multinational company that remains entirely family-owned. It operates under a set of core strategic guidelines, while its decentralized structure allows individual regions to address their own local needs.

The focus of the company is on the use of its own mineral raw materials. As a vertically integrated group, the Lasselsberger Group stands for resource-saving extraction, refinement, and processing of its own minerals raw materials, resulting in a broad, vertical integration of the product range combined with ongoing innovation. Through its international subsidiaries - clearly structured in three divisions - the group sells a wide range of products from raw materials to ceramic tiles and classic building materials.

The raw materials sand, gravel, crushed stone, kaolin, feldspar, clay, and perlite for the construction and building materials industry as well as the glass fiber, paper and refractory industries are mined at the production sites of the Minerals Division.

The companies in the Ceramics Division produce wall and floor tiless, decorations, and porcelain stoneware with a ceramic tradition for over 130 years with the core brands Rako, Zalakeramika, Cesarom and LB Ceramics.

Under the Cemix brand, the companies in the Material Buildings division produce plasters and joint mortars, adhesives, mortar, screeds, concrete, lime, limestone, and white cement.

In addition to resource-saving extraction, preparation, refinement, processing and delivery of the products, more work is being done on the development of sustainable and energy-efficient products and solutions.

In this context, Lasselsberger GmbH received for its "Green Building" project the Sustainability Award 2022 in the Ecology category in May 2022, which was awarded by the Mineral Raw Materials Forum in Austria.

== Recultivation of the Lasselsberg gravel ponds in Wörth/Pöchlarn ==
With numerous renaturation measures, the Lasselsberger Group aims to create an ecological balance for flora and fauna at its production sites. A good example of this is the pond and forest landscape around the Lasselsberger Kiesteiche in Pöchlarn, where targeted renaturation measures have been carried out for 30 years. The resulting floodplain-like areas represent a very attractive habitat for plants and animals, as there are fewer pests and there are no floods. Waterfowl are particularly abundant as a product of these measures. So far, over 200 bird species have been spotted at the site, including several not previously seen in Austria. Thanks to a professional partnership with the LANIUS association and, for several years, the Birdlife association; as well as a cooperation with the Öko-Hauptschule Pöchlarn, conservation efforts for these secondary habitats have been a priority for the Group.
