= Holovousy =

Holovousy may refer to places in the Czech Republic:

- Holovousy (Jičín District), a municipality and village in the Hradec Králové Region
- Holovousy (Plzeň-North District), a municipality and village in the Plzeň Region
