= Všehrdy =

Všehrdy may refer to places in the Czech Republic:

- Všehrdy (Chomutov District), a municipality and village in the Ústí nad Labem Region
- Všehrdy (Plzeň-North District), a municipality and village in the Plzeň Region
