= Trnová (Plzeň-North District) =

- Municipality
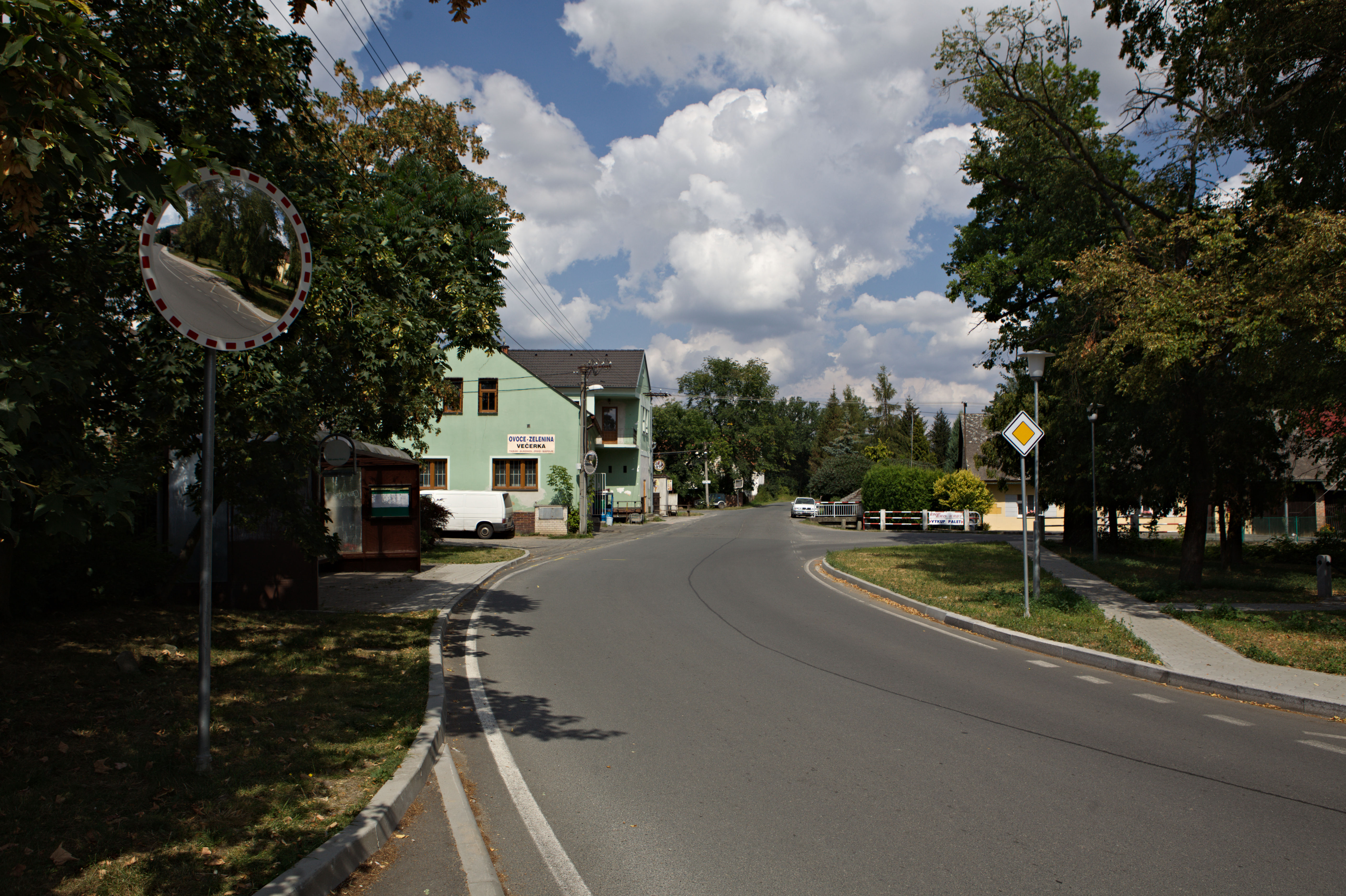
- Centre of Trnová

- Flag Coat of arms

- Location in the Czech Republic
- Coordinates: 49°51′40″N 13°19′26″E
- Country: Czech Republic
- Region: Plzeň
- District: Plzeň-North
- First mentioned: 1181

Area
  - Total: 6.50 km^{2} (2.51 sq mi)
- Elevation: 418 m (1,371 ft)

Population (2026-01-01)
  - Total: 980
  - Density: 150/km^{2} (390/sq mi)
- Time zone: UTC+1 (CET)
  - Summer (DST): UTC+2 (CEST)
- Postal code: 330 13
- Website: www.trnova.cz

Trnová is a municipality and village in Plzeň-North District in the Plzeň Region of the Czech Republic. It has about 900 inhabitants.

Trnová lies approximately 13 kilometres (8 mi) north of Plzeň and 82 km (51 mi) west of Prague.

== Demographics ==
Historical population
Year	Pop.	±%
1869	311	—
1880	376	+20.9%
1890	477	+26.9%
1900	558	+17.0%
1910	714	+28.0%
1921	781	+9.4%
1930	983	+25.9%
1950	1,020	+3.8%
1961	932	−8.6%
1970	889	−4.6%
1980	812	−8.7%
1991	785	−3.3%
2001	797	+1.5%
2011	866	+8.7%
2021	1,013	+17.0%
Source: Censuses
