= Vysoká Libyně =

- Municipality
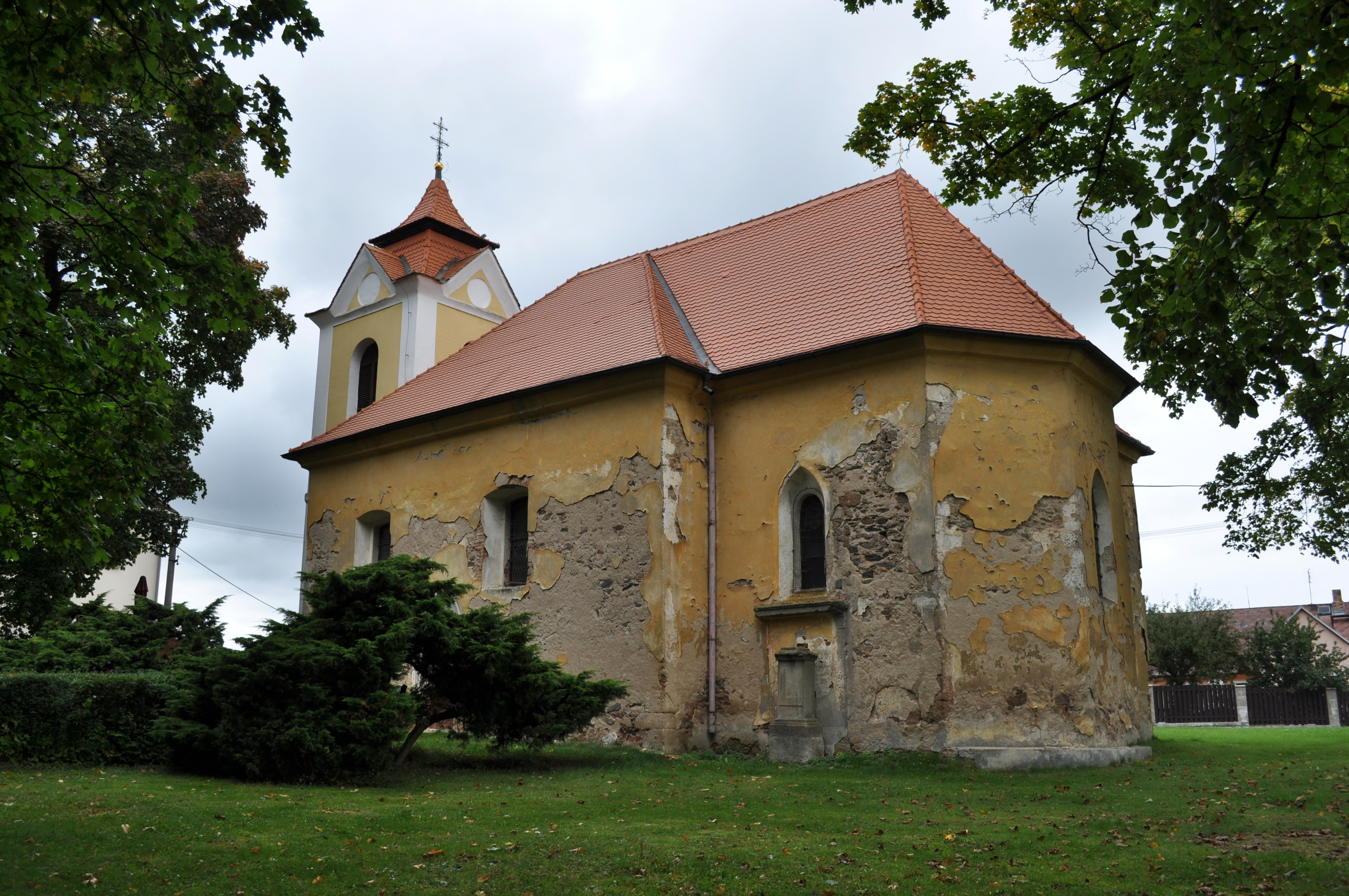
- Church of Saint Blaise

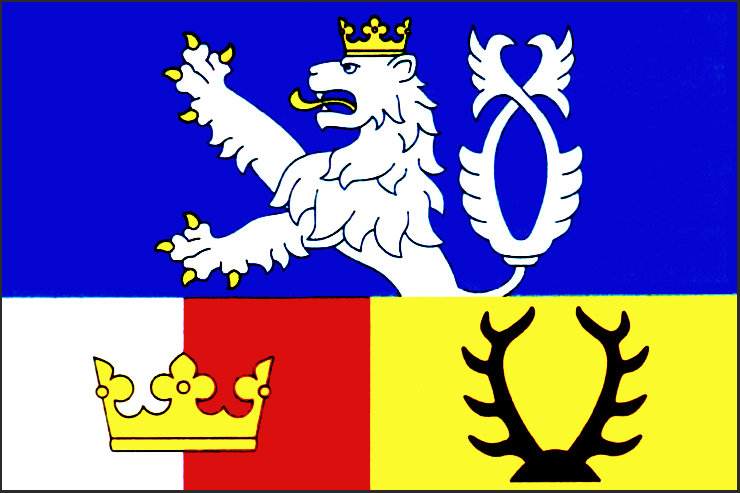
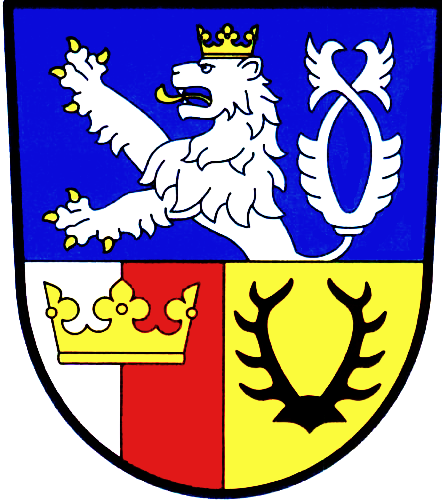
- Flag Coat of arms

- Location in the Czech Republic
- Coordinates: 50°1′19″N 13°27′3″E
- Country: Czech Republic
- Region: Plzeň
- District: Plzeň-North
- First mentioned: 1180

Area
  - Total: 12.85 km^{2} (4.96 sq mi)
- Elevation: 558 m (1,831 ft)

Population (2026-01-01)
  - Total: 202
  - Density: 15.7/km^{2} (40.7/sq mi)
- Time zone: UTC+1 (CET)
  - Summer (DST): UTC+2 (CEST)
- Postal code: 331 41
- Website: www.vysokalibyne.cz

Vysoká Libyně (German: Hochlibin) is a municipality and village in Plzeň-North District in the Plzeň Region of the Czech Republic. It has about 200 inhabitants.

Vysoká Libyně lies approximately 31 kilometres (19 mi) north of Plzeň and 70 km (43 mi) west of Prague.

== Demographics ==
Historical population
Year	Pop.	±%
1869	450	—
1880	416	−7.6%
1890	373	−10.3%
1900	371	−0.5%
1910	347	−6.5%
1921	378	+8.9%
1930	349	−7.7%
1950	223	−36.1%
1961	213	−4.5%
1970	165	−22.5%
1980	153	−7.3%
1991	214	+39.9%
2001	241	+12.6%
2011	237	−1.7%
2021	205	−13.5%
Source: Censuses
