= Blatnice (Plzeň-North District) =

- Municipality
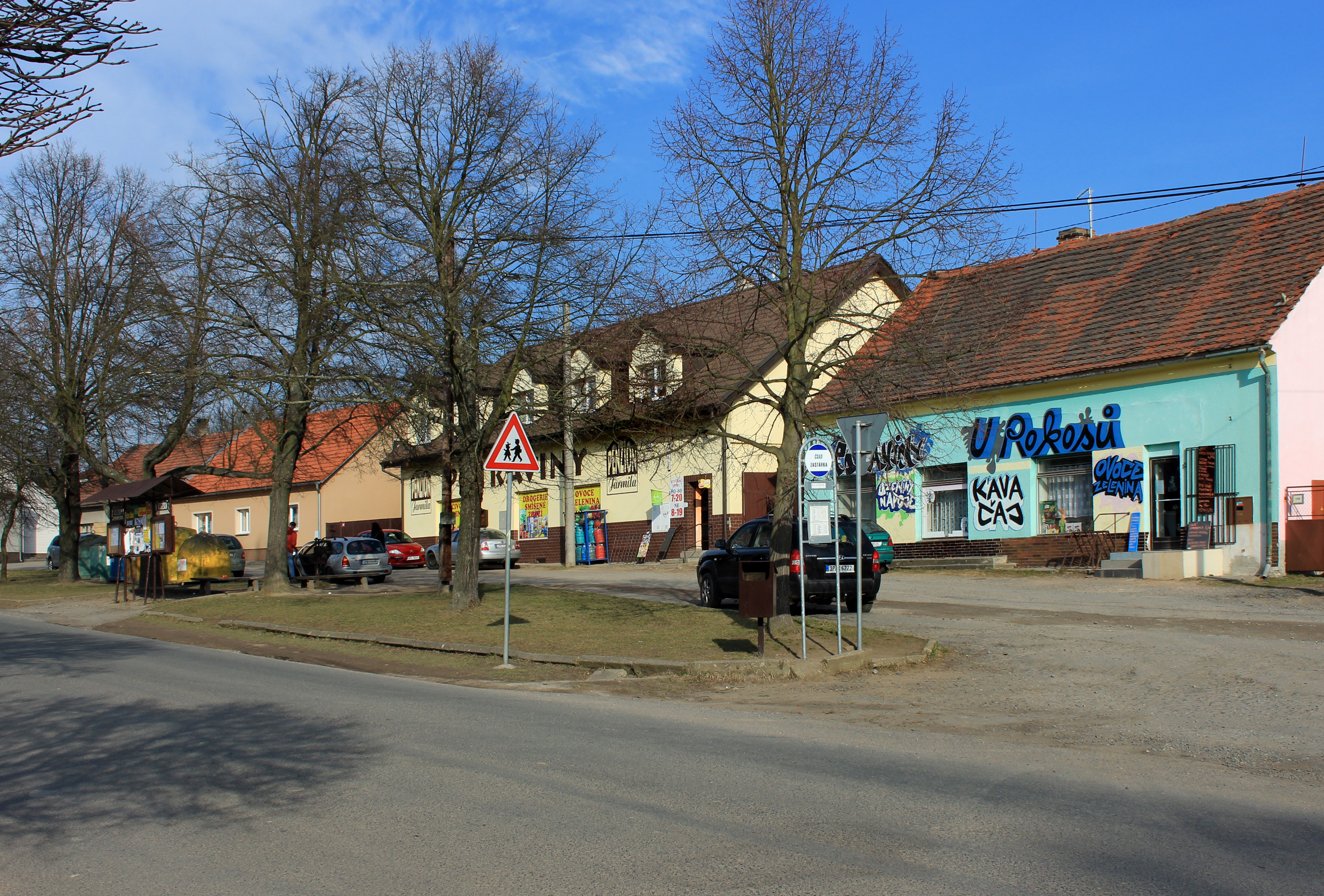
- Centre of Blatnice

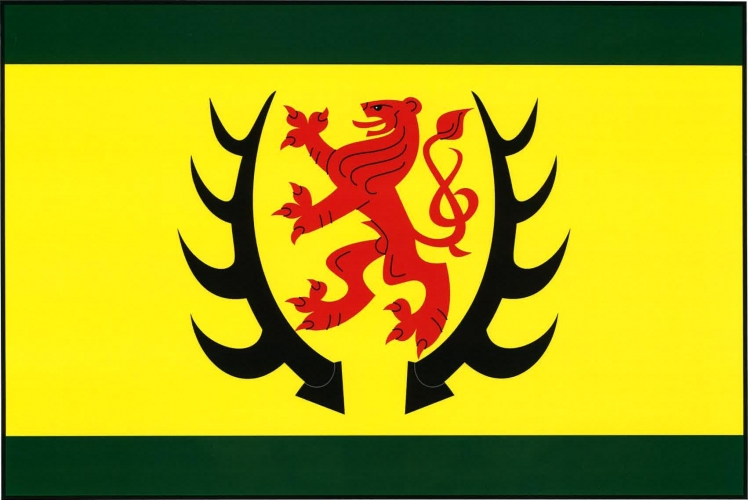
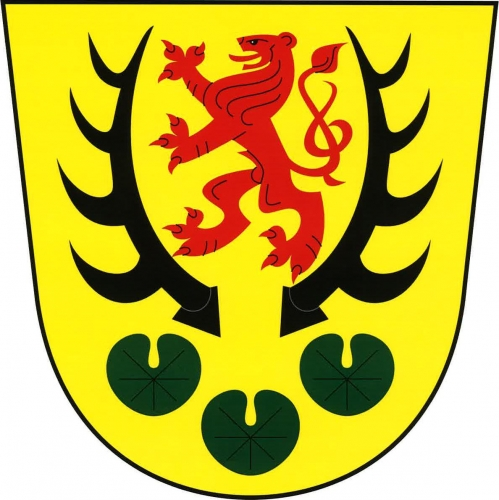
- Flag Coat of arms

- Location in the Czech Republic
- Coordinates: 49°43′11″N 13°9′22″E
- Country: Czech Republic
- Region: Plzeň
- District: Plzeň-North
- First mentioned: 1379

Area
  - Total: 4.13 km^{2} (1.59 sq mi)
- Elevation: 360 m (1,180 ft)

Population (2026-01-01)
  - Total: 915
  - Density: 222/km^{2} (574/sq mi)
- Time zone: UTC+1 (CET)
  - Summer (DST): UTC+2 (CEST)
- Postal code: 330 25
- Website: www.blatnice.cz

Blatnice is a municipality and village in Plzeň-North District in the Plzeň Region of the Czech Republic. It has about 900 inhabitants.

Blatnice lies approximately 17 kilometres (11 mi) west of Plzeň and 100 kilometres (62 mi) south-west of Prague.

== Etymology ==
The name is derived from Czech word bláto (i.e. 'mud').

== History ==
The first written mention of Blatnice is from 1379.

Blatnice was annexed to Nazi Germany in 1938 and administered as part of the Reichsgau Sudetenland. After World War II, the German-speaking population was expelled.

== Demographics ==
Historical population
Year	Pop.	±%
1869	262	—
1880	725	+176.7%
1890	933	+28.7%
1900	1,019	+9.2%
1910	948	−7.0%
1921	937	−1.2%
1930	1,052	+12.3%
1950	822	−21.9%
1961	896	+9.0%
1970	807	−9.9%
1980	749	−7.2%
1991	665	−11.2%
2001	691	+3.9%
2011	780	+12.9%
2021	925	+18.6%
Source: Censuses
