= Kočín =

- Municipality
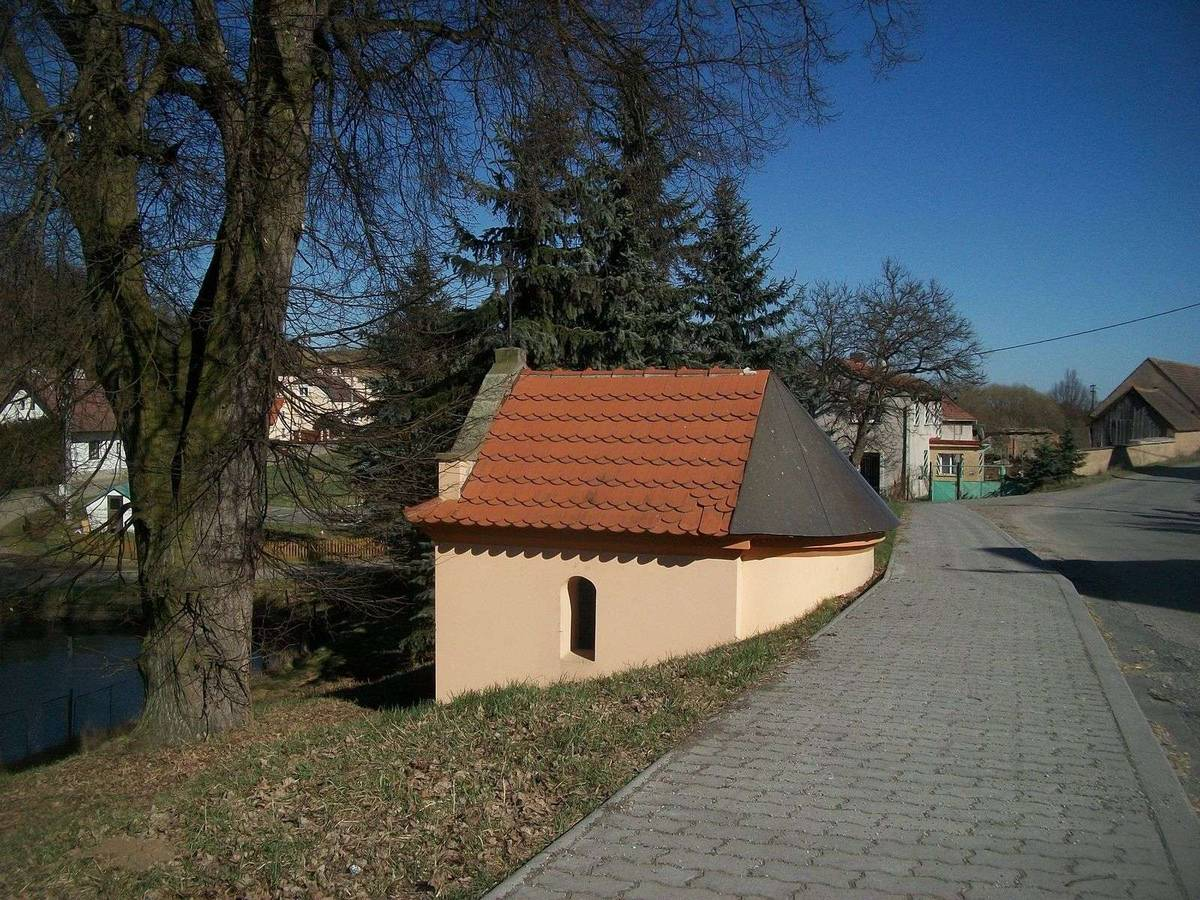
- Chapel in Kočín

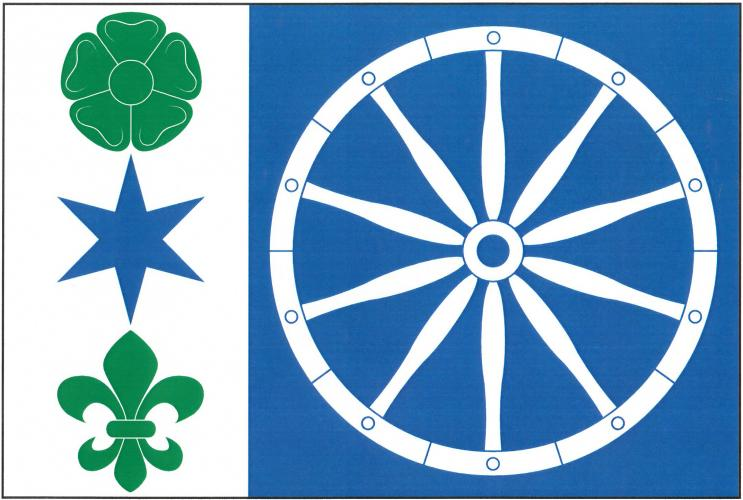
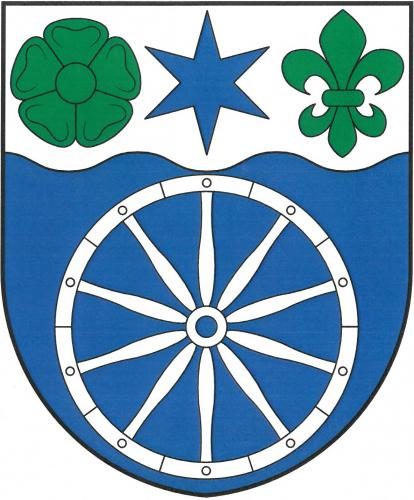
- Flag Coat of arms

- Location in the Czech Republic
- Coordinates: 49°55′50″N 13°28′34″E
- Country: Czech Republic
- Region: Plzeň
- District: Plzeň-North
- First mentioned: 1183

Area
  - Total: 3.77 km^{2} (1.46 sq mi)
- Elevation: 400 m (1,300 ft)

Population (2026-01-01)
  - Total: 105
  - Density: 27.9/km^{2} (72.1/sq mi)
- Time zone: UTC+1 (CET)
  - Summer (DST): UTC+2 (CEST)
- Postal code: 331 41
- Website: www.obec-kocin.cz

Kočín is a municipality and village in Plzeň-North District in the Plzeň Region of the Czech Republic. It has about 100 inhabitants.

Kočín lies approximately 22 kilometres (14 mi) north of Plzeň and 70 km (43 mi) west of Prague.

== Demographics ==
Historical population
Year	Pop.	±%
1869	270	—
1880	320	+18.5%
1890	263	−17.8%
1900	276	+4.9%
1910	301	+9.1%
1921	314	+4.3%
1930	286	−8.9%
1950	177	−38.1%
1961	154	−13.0%
1970	115	−25.3%
1980	135	+17.4%
1991	151	+11.9%
2001	108	−28.5%
2011	124	+14.8%
2021	117	−5.6%
Source: Censuses
