= Kopidlo =

- Municipality
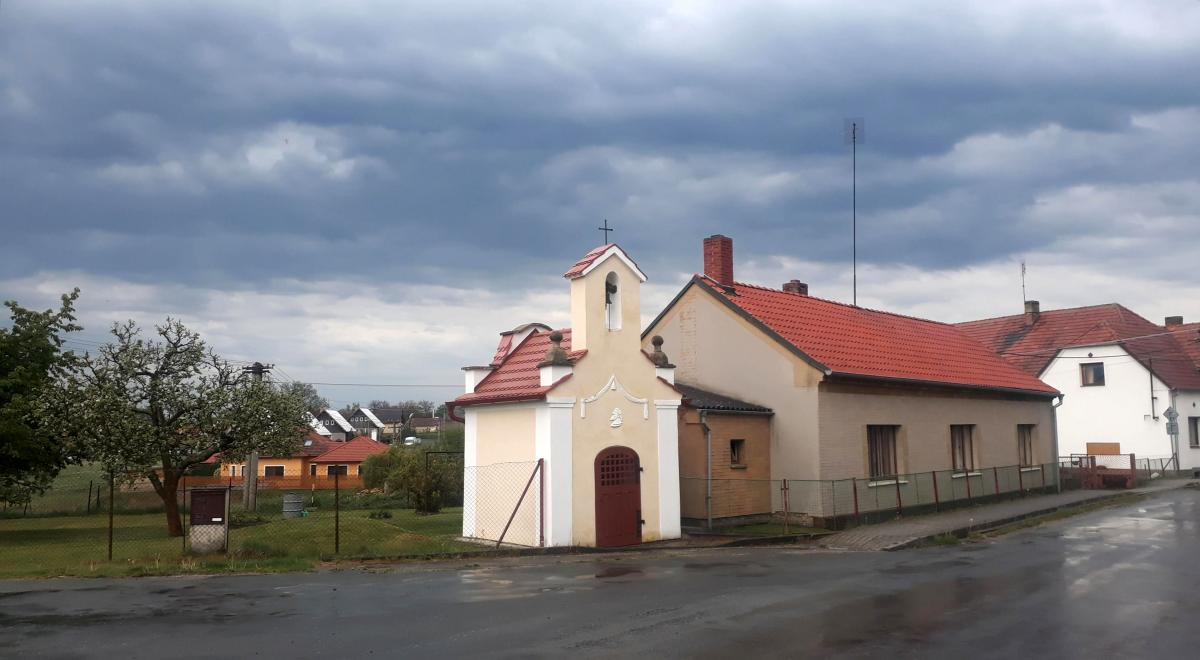
- Chapel in Kopidlo

- Location in the Czech Republic
- Coordinates: 49°56′36″N 13°27′52″E
- Country: Czech Republic
- Region: Plzeň
- District: Plzeň-North
- First mentioned: 1181

Area
  - Total: 2.72 km^{2} (1.05 sq mi)
- Elevation: 442 m (1,450 ft)

Population (2026-01-01)
  - Total: 140
  - Density: 51/km^{2} (130/sq mi)
- Time zone: UTC+1 (CET)
  - Summer (DST): UTC+2 (CEST)
- Postal code: 331 41
- Website: www.obec-kopidlo.cz

Kopidlo is a municipality and village in Plzeň-North District in the Plzeň Region of the Czech Republic. It has about 100 inhabitants.

Kopidlo lies approximately 23 kilometres (14 mi) north of Plzeň and 71 km (44 mi) west of Prague.

== Demographics ==
Historical population
Year	Pop.	±%
1869	356	—
1880	276	−22.5%
1890	339	+22.8%
1900	302	−10.9%
1910	386	+27.8%
1921	377	−2.3%
1930	322	−14.6%
1950	229	−28.9%
1961	208	−9.2%
1970	190	−8.7%
1980	177	−6.8%
1991	143	−19.2%
2001	117	−18.2%
2011	126	+7.7%
2021	140	+11.1%
Source: Censuses
