= Rochlov =

- Municipality
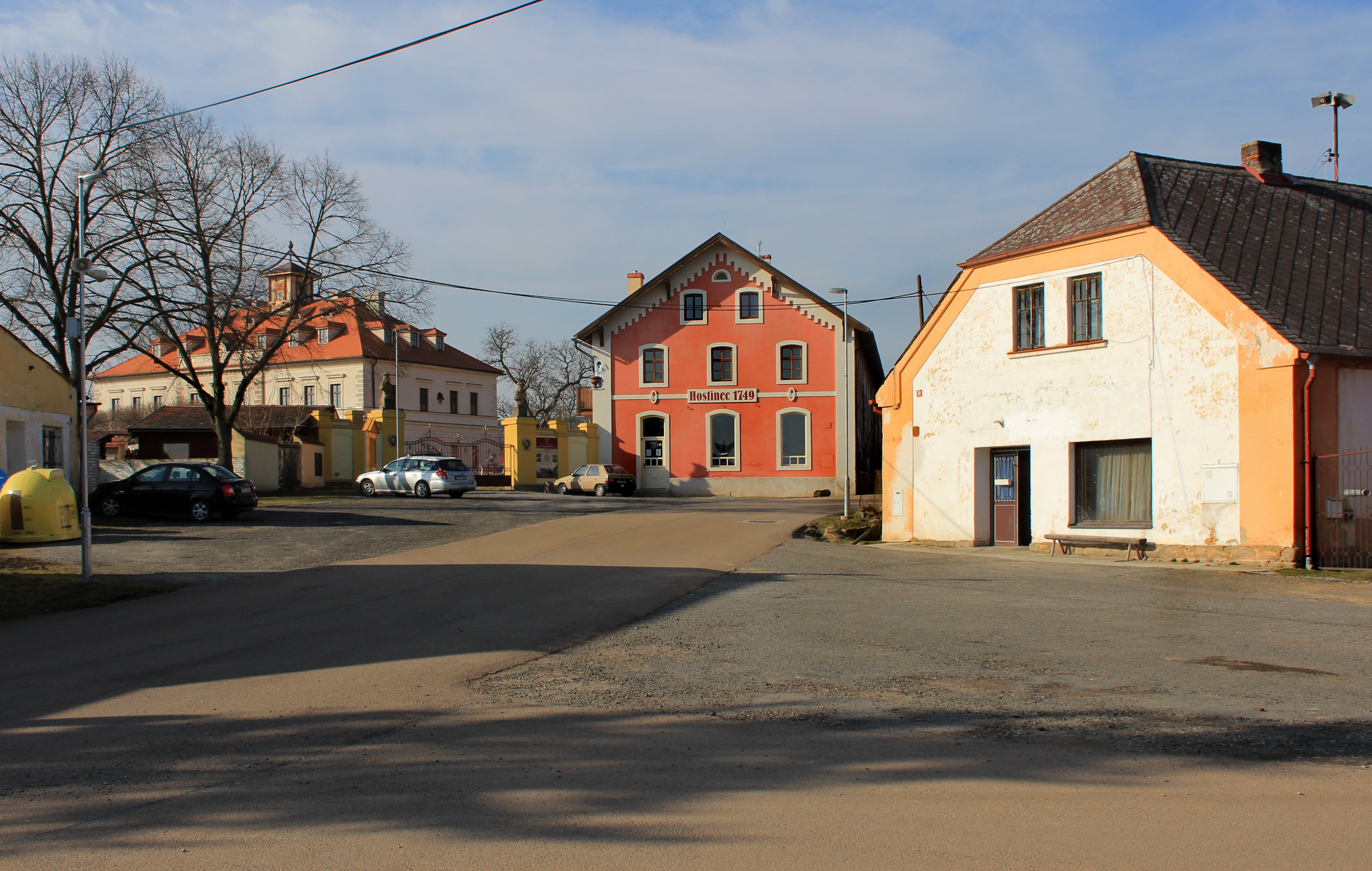
- Centre of Rochlov

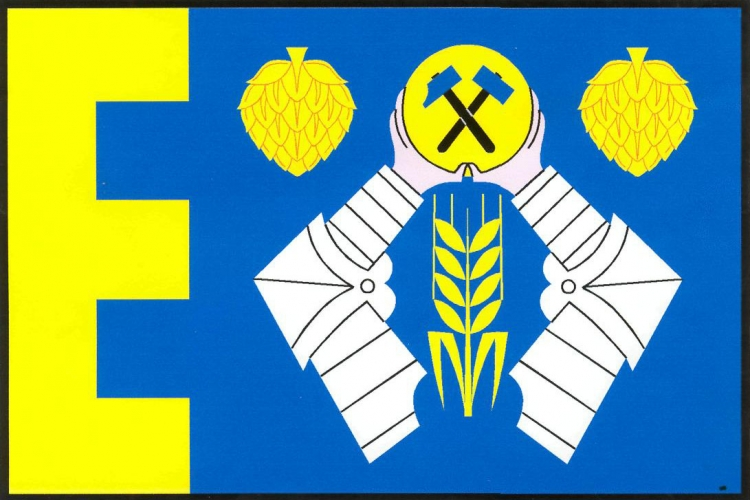
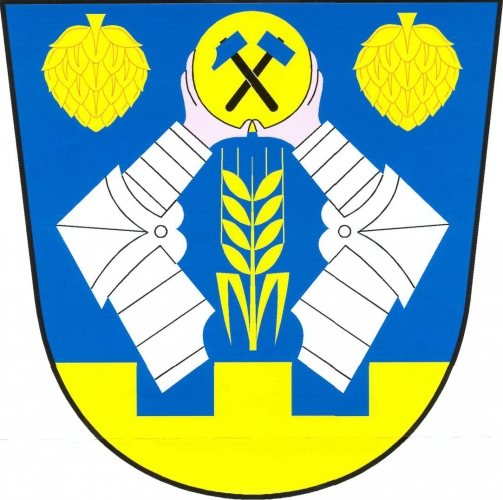
- Flag Coat of arms

- Location in the Czech Republic
- Coordinates: 49°43′51″N 13°8′45″E
- Country: Czech Republic
- Region: Plzeň
- District: Plzeň-North
- First mentioned: 1379

Area
  - Total: 4.61 km^{2} (1.78 sq mi)
- Elevation: 385 m (1,263 ft)

Population (2026-01-01)
  - Total: 307
  - Density: 66.6/km^{2} (172/sq mi)
- Time zone: UTC+1 (CET)
  - Summer (DST): UTC+2 (CEST)
- Postal code: 330 23
- Website: www.obec-rochlov.cz

Rochlov is a municipality and village in Plzeň-North District in the Plzeň Region of the Czech Republic. It has about 300 inhabitants.

Rochlov lies approximately 17 kilometres (11 mi) west of Plzeň and 100 km (62 mi) south-west of Prague.

== Demographics ==
Historical population
Year	Pop.	±%
1869	328	—
1880	502	+53.0%
1890	584	+16.3%
1900	664	+13.7%
1910	588	−11.4%
1921	569	−3.2%
1930	604	+6.2%
1950	436	−27.8%
1961	391	−10.3%
1970	341	−12.8%
1980	303	−11.1%
1991	227	−25.1%
2001	253	+11.5%
2011	250	−1.2%
2021	287	+14.8%
Source: Censuses
