= Mrtník =

- Municipality
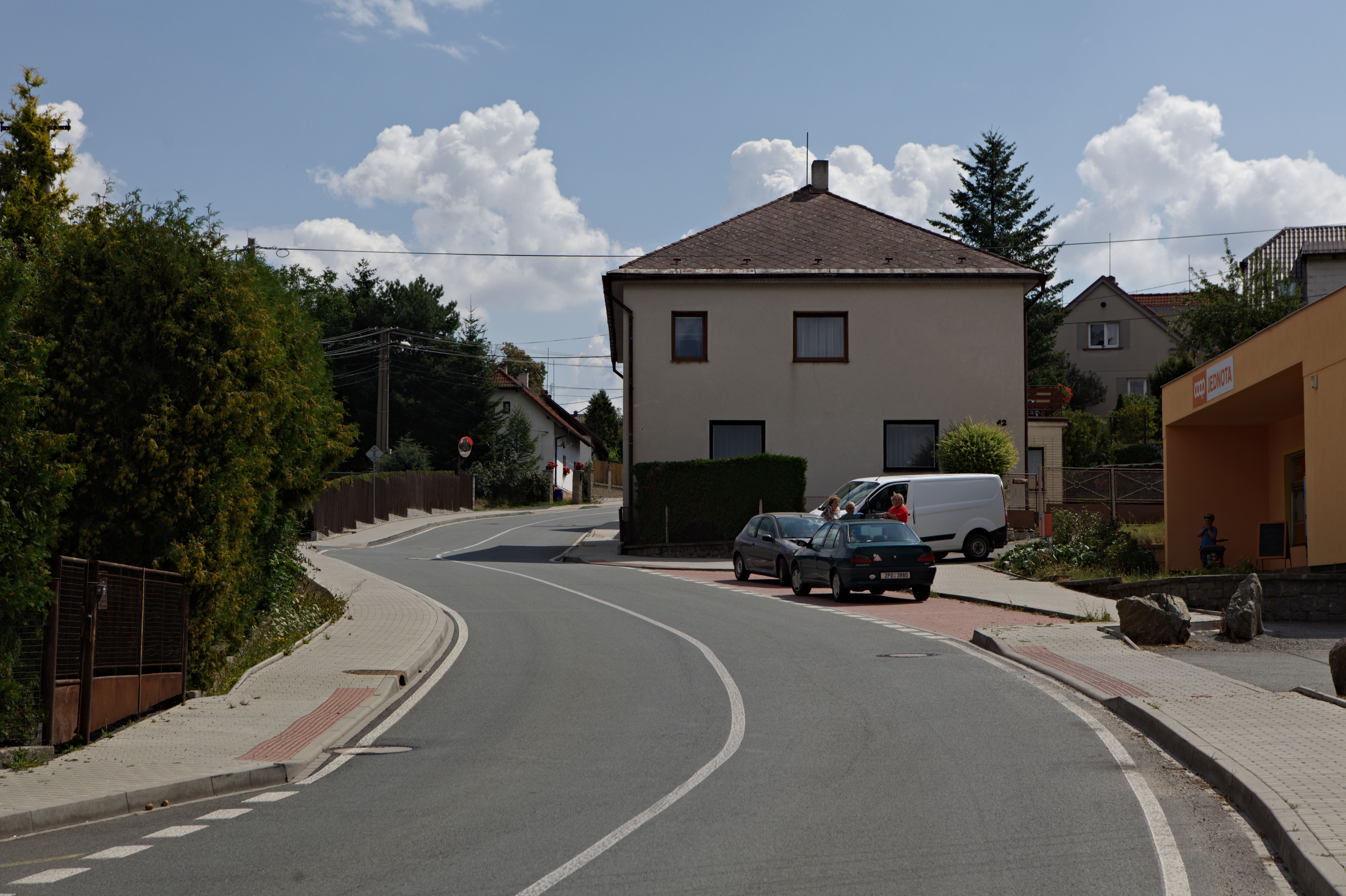
- Main road

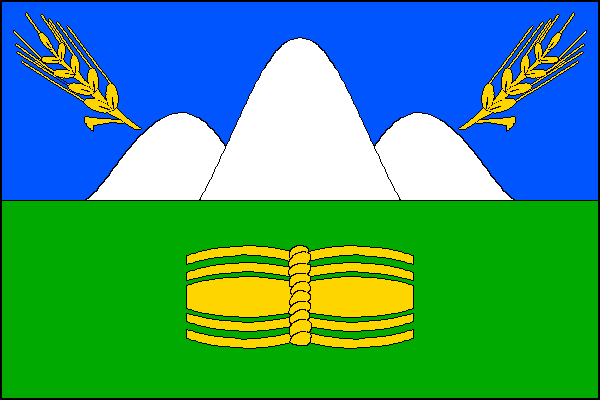
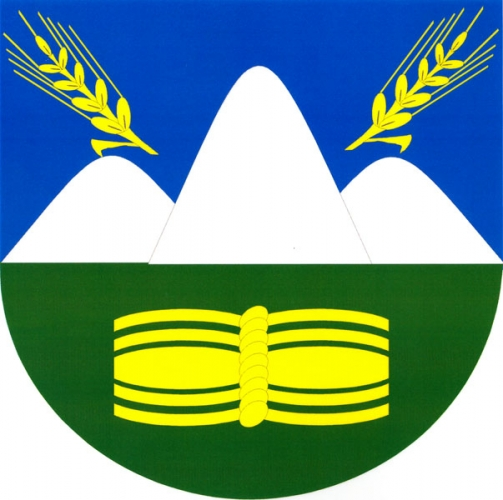
- Flag Coat of arms

- Location in the Czech Republic
- Coordinates: 49°53′44″N 13°18′44″E
- Country: Czech Republic
- Region: Plzeň
- District: Plzeň-North
- First mentioned: 1420

Area
  - Total: 3.91 km^{2} (1.51 sq mi)
- Elevation: 456 m (1,496 ft)

Population (2026-01-01)
  - Total: 341
  - Density: 87.2/km^{2} (226/sq mi)
- Time zone: UTC+1 (CET)
  - Summer (DST): UTC+2 (CEST)
- Postal code: 331 52
- Website: www.mrtnik.cz

Mrtník is a municipality and village in Plzeň-North District in the Plzeň Region of the Czech Republic. It has about 300 inhabitants.

Mrtník lies approximately 18 kilometres (11 mi) north of Plzeň and 82 km (51 mi) west of Prague.

== History ==
The first written mention of Mrtník is from 1420.

== Demographics ==
Historical population
Year	Pop.	±%
1869	288	—
1880	307	+6.6%
1890	327	+6.5%
1900	393	+20.2%
1910	416	+5.9%
1921	414	−0.5%
1930	477	+15.2%
1950	330	−30.8%
1961	345	+4.5%
1970	323	−6.4%
1980	292	−9.6%
1991	296	+1.4%
2001	338	+14.2%
2011	331	−2.1%
2021	336	+1.5%
Source: Censuses
