= Líté =

- Municipality
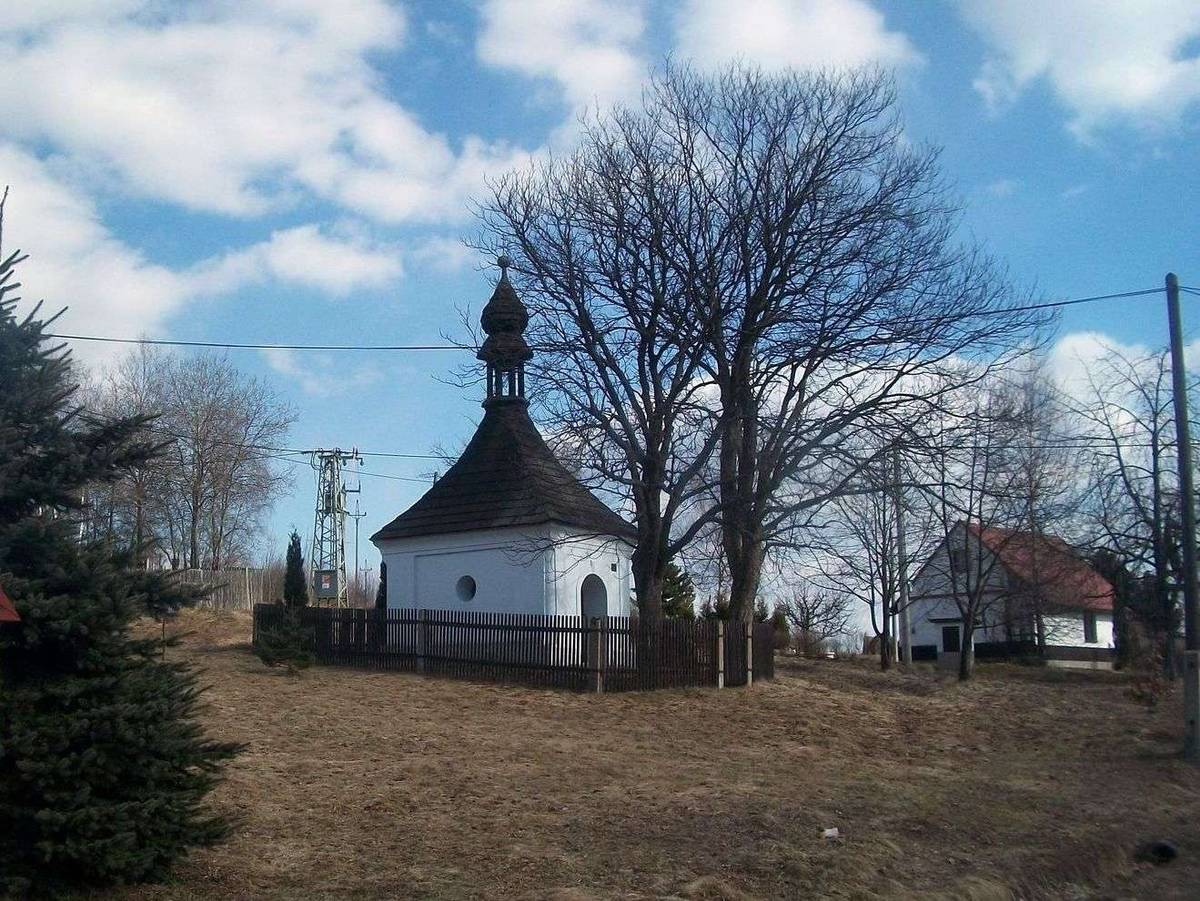
- Chapel in Spankov

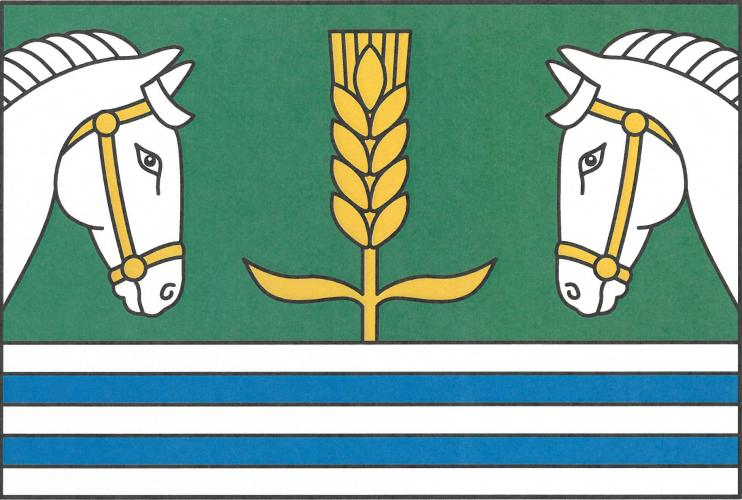
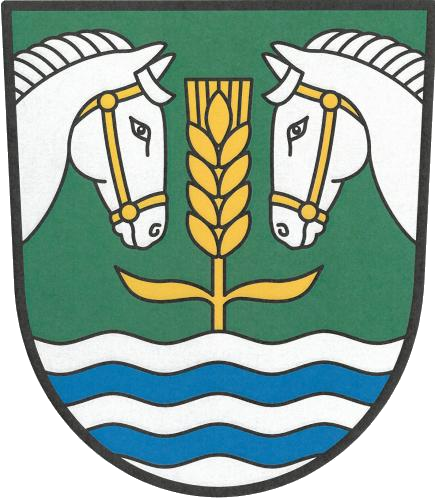
- Flag Coat of arms

- Location in the Czech Republic
- Coordinates: 49°54′49″N 13°15′39″E
- Country: Czech Republic
- Region: Plzeň
- District: Plzeň-North
- First mentioned: 1175

Area
  - Total: 6.01 km^{2} (2.32 sq mi)
- Elevation: 478 m (1,568 ft)

Population (2026-01-01)
  - Total: 214
  - Density: 35.6/km^{2} (92.2/sq mi)
- Time zone: UTC+1 (CET)
  - Summer (DST): UTC+2 (CEST)
- Postal code: 331 52
- Website: www.obec-lite.cz

Líté is a municipality and village in Plzeň-North District in the Plzeň Region of the Czech Republic. It has about 200 inhabitants.

Líté lies approximately 21 kilometres (13 mi) north-west of Plzeň and 86 km (53 mi) west of Prague.

== Administrative division ==
Líté consists of two municipal parts (in brackets population according to the 2021 census):

- Líté (183)
- Spankov (26)

== Demographics ==
Historical population
Year	Pop.	±%
1869	284	—
1880	332	+16.9%
1890	313	−5.7%
1900	355	+13.4%
1910	340	−4.2%
1921	345	+1.5%
1930	332	−3.8%
1950	238	−28.3%
1961	262	+10.1%
1970	233	−11.1%
1980	238	+2.1%
1991	228	−4.2%
2001	214	−6.1%
2011	203	−5.1%
2021	209	+3.0%
Source: Censuses
