= Kaznějov =

- Town
- Centre of Kaznějov

- Flag Coat of arms

- Location in the Czech Republic
- Coordinates: 49°53′35″N 13°22′59″E
- Country: Czech Republic
- Region: Plzeň
- District: Plzeň-North
- First mentioned: 1145

Government
  - Mayor: Eva Šimlová

Area
  - Total: 12.30 km^{2} (4.75 sq mi)
- Elevation: 398 m (1,306 ft)

Population (2026-01-01)
  - Total: 3,087
  - Density: 251.0/km^{2} (650.0/sq mi)
- Time zone: UTC+1 (CET)
  - Summer (DST): UTC+2 (CEST)
- Postal code: 331 51
- Website: www.kaznejov.cz

Kaznějov (Czech pronunciation: [ˈkazɲɛjof]) is a town in Plzeň-North District in the Plzeň Region of the Czech Republic. It has about 3,100 inhabitants.

== Etymology ==
The name was derived from the personal name Kazněj (a variant of the name Kazimír), meaning "Kazněj's (court)".

== Geography ==
Kaznějov is located about 14 kilometres (9 mi) north of Plzeň. It lies in the Plasy Uplands. The highest point is the hill Berdovna at 513 m (1,683 ft) above sea level. The stream Kaznějovský potok flows through the town.

== History ==
The first written mention of Kaznějov is from 1145, after the monastery in Plasy was founded. The village served as the economic background of the monastery.

In 1997, Kaznějov became a town.

== Demographics ==
Historical population

Year	Pop.	±%
1869	507	—
1880	946	+86.6%
1890	906	−4.2%
1900	911	+0.6%
1910	1,291	+41.7%

Year	Pop.	±%
1921	1,391	+7.7%
1930	1,708	+22.8%
1950	1,939	+13.5%
1961	2,120	+9.3%
1970	2,581	+21.7%

Year	Pop.	±%
1980	3,267	+26.6%
1991	3,193	−2.3%
2001	2,999	−6.1%
2011	3,031	+1.1%
2021	2,934	−3.2%

Source: Censuses

== Economy ==
In the woods of Kaznějov is the largest kaolinite quarry in Central Europe with a production of 320,000 tonnes per year.

== Transport ==
Kaznějov is located on the railway line Plzeň–Most.

== Sights ==
The most important monument of Kaznějov is the Chapel of Saint John the Baptist. After the old Baroque chapel burned down in 1892, the current chapel was built in the pseudo-Romanesque style in 1893–1894.
