= Slatina (Plzeň-North District) =

- Municipality
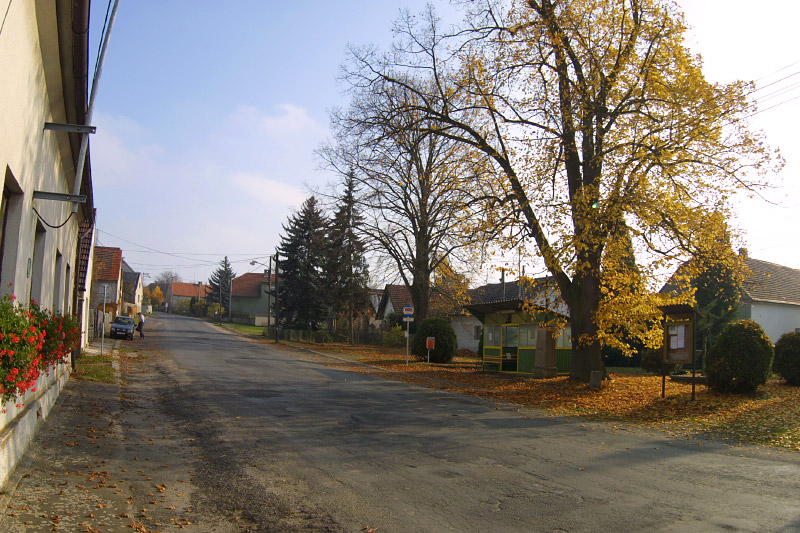
- Centre of Slatina

- Location in the Czech Republic
- Coordinates: 49°59′5″N 13°38′2″E
- Country: Czech Republic
- Region: Plzeň
- District: Plzeň-North
- First mentioned: 1327

Area
  - Total: 5.87 km^{2} (2.27 sq mi)
- Elevation: 416 m (1,365 ft)

Population (2026-01-01)
  - Total: 62
  - Density: 11/km^{2} (27/sq mi)
- Time zone: UTC+1 (CET)
  - Summer (DST): UTC+2 (CEST)
- Postal code: 331 41
- Website: www.slatina-obec.cz

Slatina is a municipality and village in Plzeň-North District in the Plzeň Region of the Czech Republic. It has about 60 inhabitants.

Slatina lies approximately 33 kilometres (21 mi) north-east of Plzeň and 58 km (36 mi) west of Prague.

== Demographics ==
Historical population
Year	Pop.	±%
1869	229	—
1880	247	+7.9%
1890	240	−2.8%
1900	256	+6.7%
1910	207	−19.1%
1921	222	+7.2%
1930	195	−12.2%
1950	119	−39.0%
1961	127	+6.7%
1970	123	−3.1%
1980	100	−18.7%
1991	91	−9.0%
2001	80	−12.1%
2011	65	−18.8%
2021	53	−18.5%
Source: Censuses
