= Hlince =

- Municipality
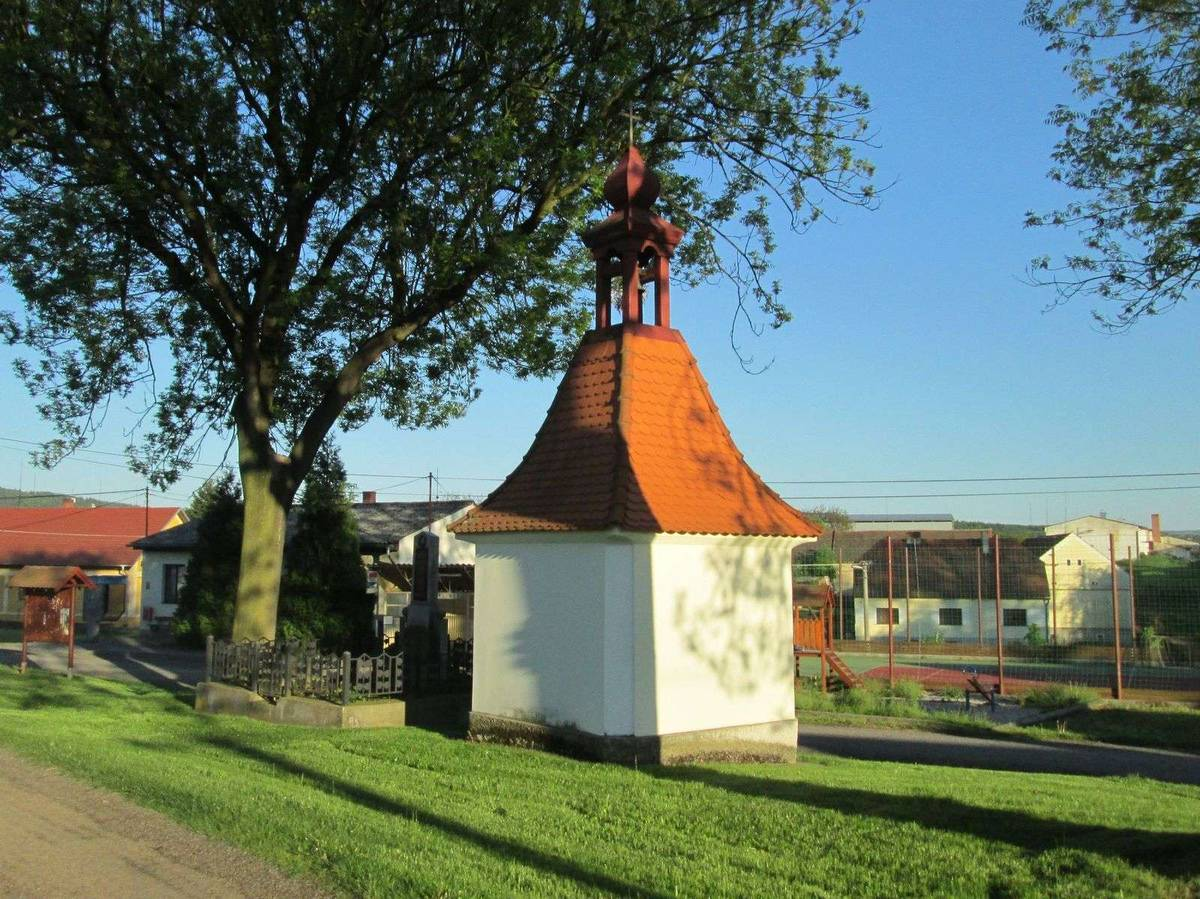
- Chapel in Hlince

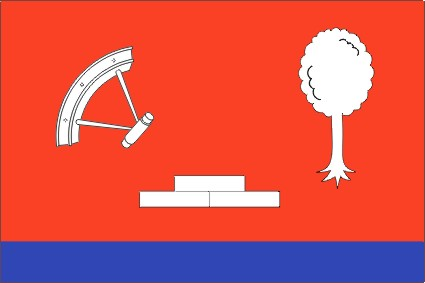
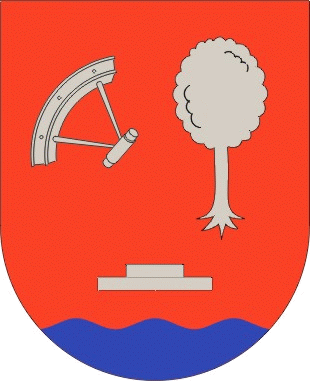
- Flag Coat of arms

- Location in the Czech Republic
- Coordinates: 49°56′54″N 13°37′30″E
- Country: Czech Republic
- Region: Plzeň
- District: Plzeň-North
- First mentioned: 1361

Area
  - Total: 7.59 km^{2} (2.93 sq mi)
- Elevation: 332 m (1,089 ft)

Population (2026-01-01)
  - Total: 94
  - Density: 12/km^{2} (32/sq mi)
- Time zone: UTC+1 (CET)
  - Summer (DST): UTC+2 (CEST)
- Postal code: 331 43
- Website: www.hlince.cz

Hlince is a municipality and village in Plzeň-North District in the Plzeň Region of the Czech Republic. It has about 90 inhabitants. The village is well preserved and is protected as a village monument zone.

Hlince lies approximately 29 kilometres (18 mi) north-east of Plzeň and 59 km (37 mi) west of Prague.

== Demographics ==
Historical population
Year	Pop.	±%
1869	235	—
1880	274	+16.6%
1890	267	−2.6%
1900	305	+14.2%
1910	258	−15.4%
1921	290	+12.4%
1930	243	−16.2%
1950	161	−33.7%
1961	156	−3.1%
1970	145	−7.1%
1980	123	−15.2%
1991	94	−23.6%
2001	88	−6.4%
2011	77	−12.5%
2021	80	+3.9%
Source: Censuses
