= Studená (Plzeň-North District) =

- Municipality
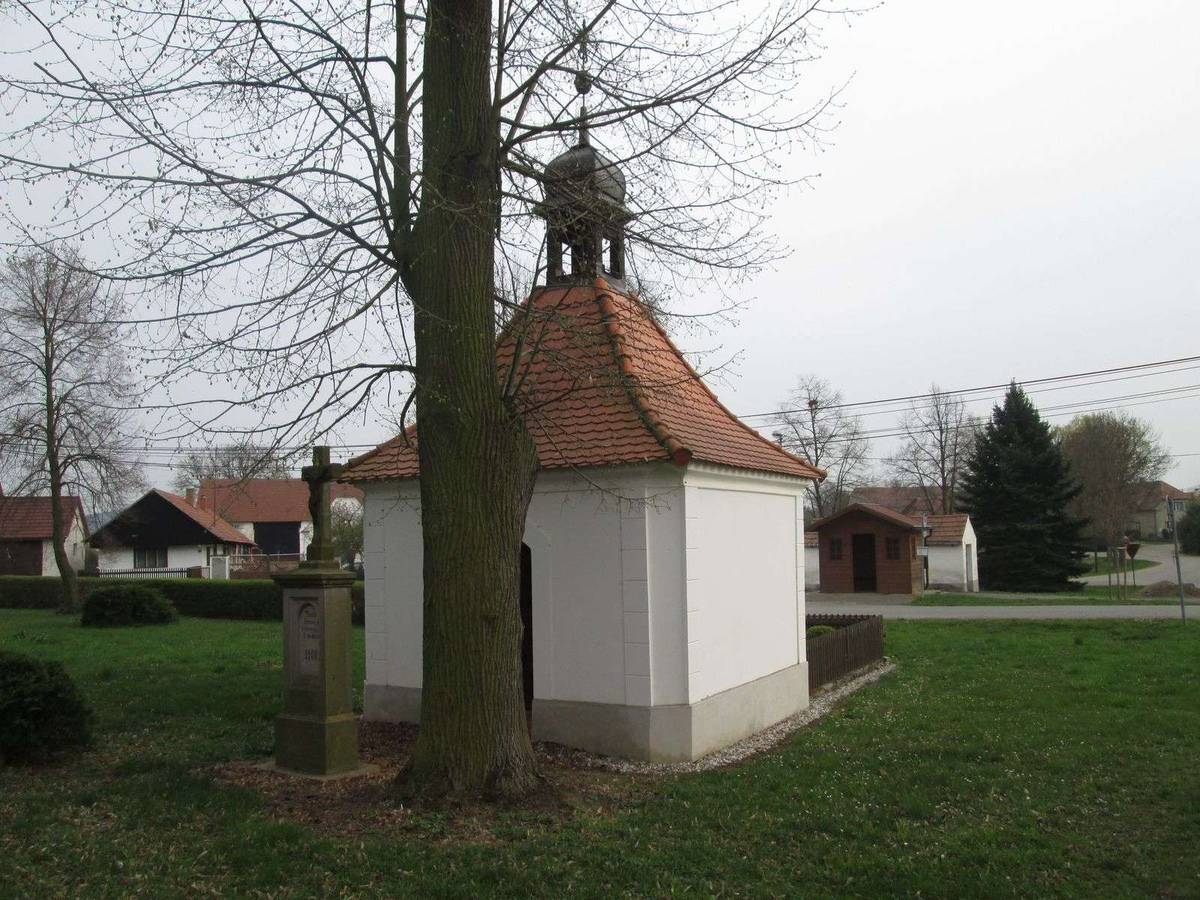
- Chapel in Studená

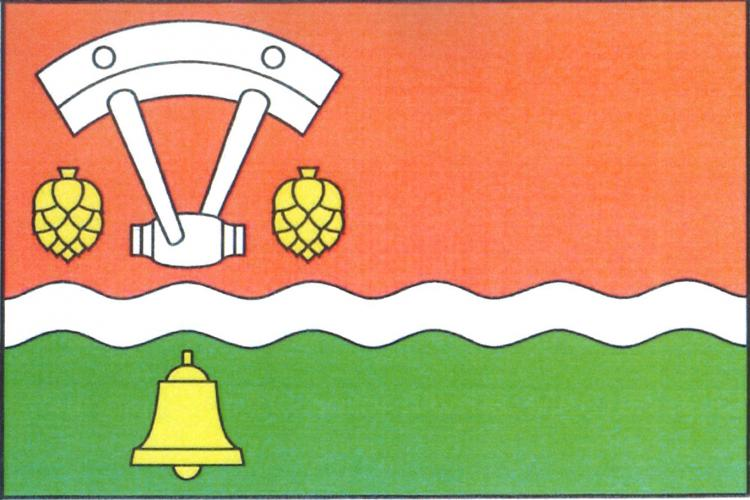
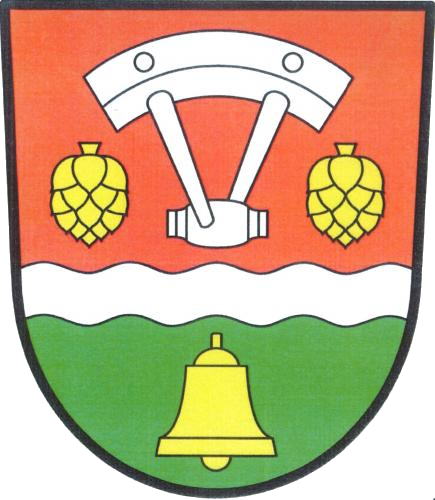
- Flag Coat of arms

- Location in the Czech Republic
- Coordinates: 49°57′39″N 13°38′35″E
- Country: Czech Republic
- Region: Plzeň
- District: Plzeň-North
- First mentioned: 1454

Area
  - Total: 3.21 km^{2} (1.24 sq mi)
- Elevation: 373 m (1,224 ft)

Population (2026-01-01)
  - Total: 37
  - Density: 12/km^{2} (30/sq mi)
- Time zone: UTC+1 (CET)
  - Summer (DST): UTC+2 (CEST)
- Postal code: 331 41
- Website: www.obec-studena.cz

Studená is a municipality and village in Plzeň-North District in the Plzeň Region of the Czech Republic. It has about 40 inhabitants.

Studená lies approximately 31 kilometres (19 mi) north-east of Plzeň and 58 km (36 mi) west of Prague.

== Demographics ==
Historical population
Year	Pop.	±%
1869	286	—
1880	183	−36.0%
1890	137	−25.1%
1900	147	+7.3%
1910	133	−9.5%
1921	135	+1.5%
1930	119	−11.9%
1950	75	−37.0%
1961	62	−17.3%
1970	47	−24.2%
1980	46	−2.1%
1991	46	+0.0%
2001	43	−6.5%
2011	40	−7.0%
2021	34	−15.0%
Source: Censuses
