= Krašovice =

- Municipality
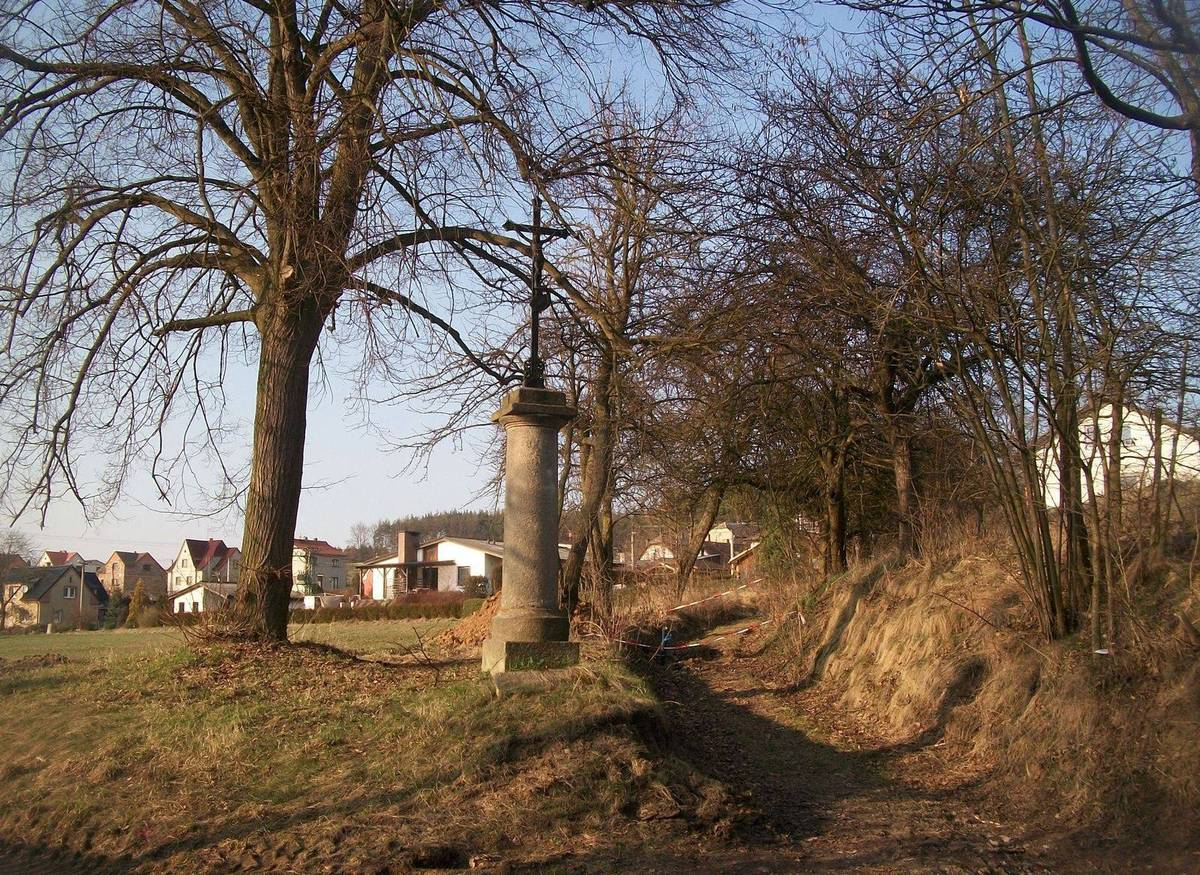
- Southeastern edge of Krašovice

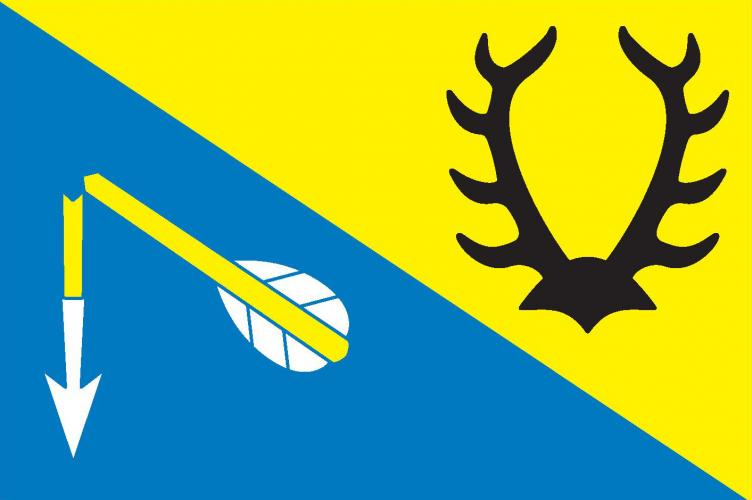
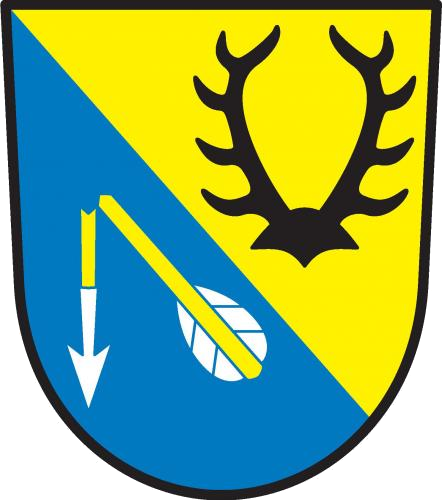
- Flag Coat of arms

- Location in the Czech Republic
- Coordinates: 49°52′21″N 13°18′19″E
- Country: Czech Republic
- Region: Plzeň
- District: Plzeň-North
- First mentioned: 1252

Area
  - Total: 7.35 km^{2} (2.84 sq mi)
- Elevation: 418 m (1,371 ft)

Population (2026-01-01)
  - Total: 353
  - Density: 48.0/km^{2} (124/sq mi)
- Time zone: UTC+1 (CET)
  - Summer (DST): UTC+2 (CEST)
- Postal code: 330 13
- Website: www.krasovice.cz

Krašovice is a municipality and village in Plzeň-North District in the Plzeň Region of the Czech Republic. It has about 400 inhabitants.

Krašovice lies approximately 15 kilometres (9 mi) north of Plzeň and 83 km (52 mi) west of Prague.

== Demographics ==
Historical population
Year	Pop.	±%
1869	352	—
1880	398	+13.1%
1890	482	+21.1%
1900	430	−10.8%
1910	430	+0.0%
1921	460	+7.0%
1930	517	+12.4%
1950	413	−20.1%
1961	435	+5.3%
1970	419	−3.7%
1980	421	+0.5%
1991	367	−12.8%
2001	350	−4.6%
2011	380	+8.6%
2021	360	−5.3%
Source: Censuses
