= Plzeň-North District =

Plzeň-North District Okres Plzeň-sever
- District
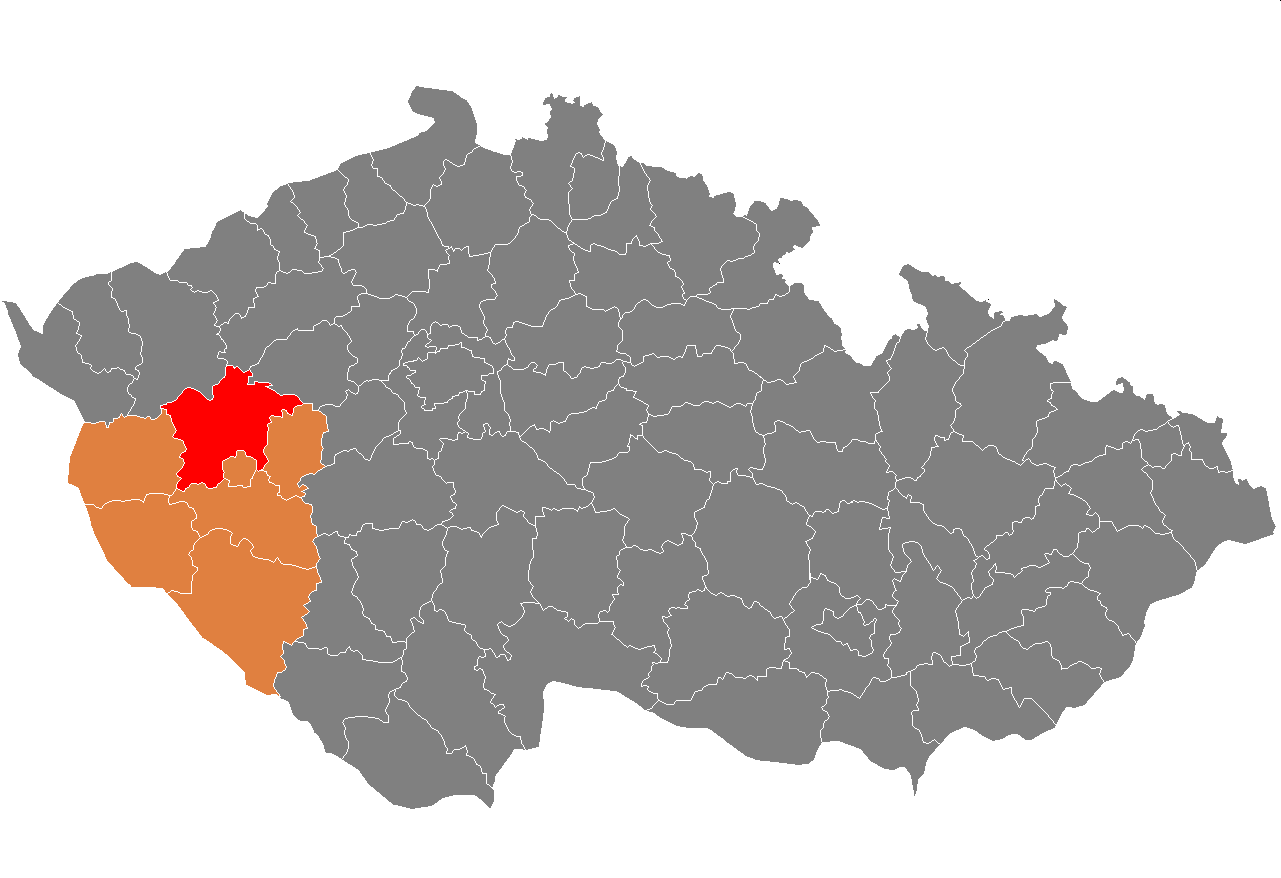
- Location in the Plzeň Region within the Czech Republic
- Coordinates: 49°54′N 13°16′E
- Country: Czech Republic
- Region: Plzeň
- Capital: Plzeň

Area
  - Total: 1,286.75 km^{2} (496.82 sq mi)

Population (2026)
  - Total: 84,037
  - Density: 65.310/km^{2} (169.15/sq mi)
- Time zone: UTC+1 (CET)
  - Summer (DST): UTC+2 (CEST)
- Municipalities: 98
- * Towns: 11
- * Market towns: 0

Plzeň-North District (Czech: okres Plzeň-sever) is a district in the Plzeň Region of the Czech Republic. Its capital is the city of Plzeň. The most populous town of the district is Nýřany.

== Administrative division ==
Plzeň-North District is divided into two administrative districts of municipalities with extended competence: Kralovice and Nýřany.

=== List of municipalities ===
Towns are marked in bold:

Bdeněves - Bezvěrov - Bílov - Blatnice - Blažim - Bohy - Brodeslavy - Bučí - Čeminy - Černíkovice - Čerňovice - Česká Bříza - Chotíkov - Chříč - Dobříč - Dolany - Dolní Bělá - Dolní Hradiště - Dražeň - Druztová - Heřmanova Huť - Hlince - Hněvnice - Holovousy - Horní Bělá - Horní Bříza - Hromnice - Hvozd - Jarov - Kaceřov - Kaznějov - Kbelany - Kočín - Kopidlo - Koryta - Kozojedy - Kozolupy - Kožlany - Kralovice - Krašovice - Křelovice - Krsy - Kunějovice - Ledce - Líně - Líšťany - Líté - Lochousice - Loza - Manětín - Město Touškov - Mladotice - Mrtník - Myslinka - Nadryby - Nečtiny - Nekmíř - Nevřeň - Nýřany - Obora - Ostrov u Bezdružic - Pastuchovice - Pernarec - Pláně - Plasy - Plešnice - Pňovany - Potvorov - Přehýšov - Příšov - Rochlov - Rybnice - Sedlec - Slatina - Štichovice - Studená - Tatiná - Tis u Blatna - Tlučná - Třemošná - Trnová - Úherce - Újezd nade Mží - Úlice - Úněšov - Úterý - Vejprnice - Velečín - Vochov - Všehrdy - Všeruby - Výrov - Vysoká Libyně - Zahrádka - Zbůch - Žihle - Žilov - Zruč-Senec

== Geography ==
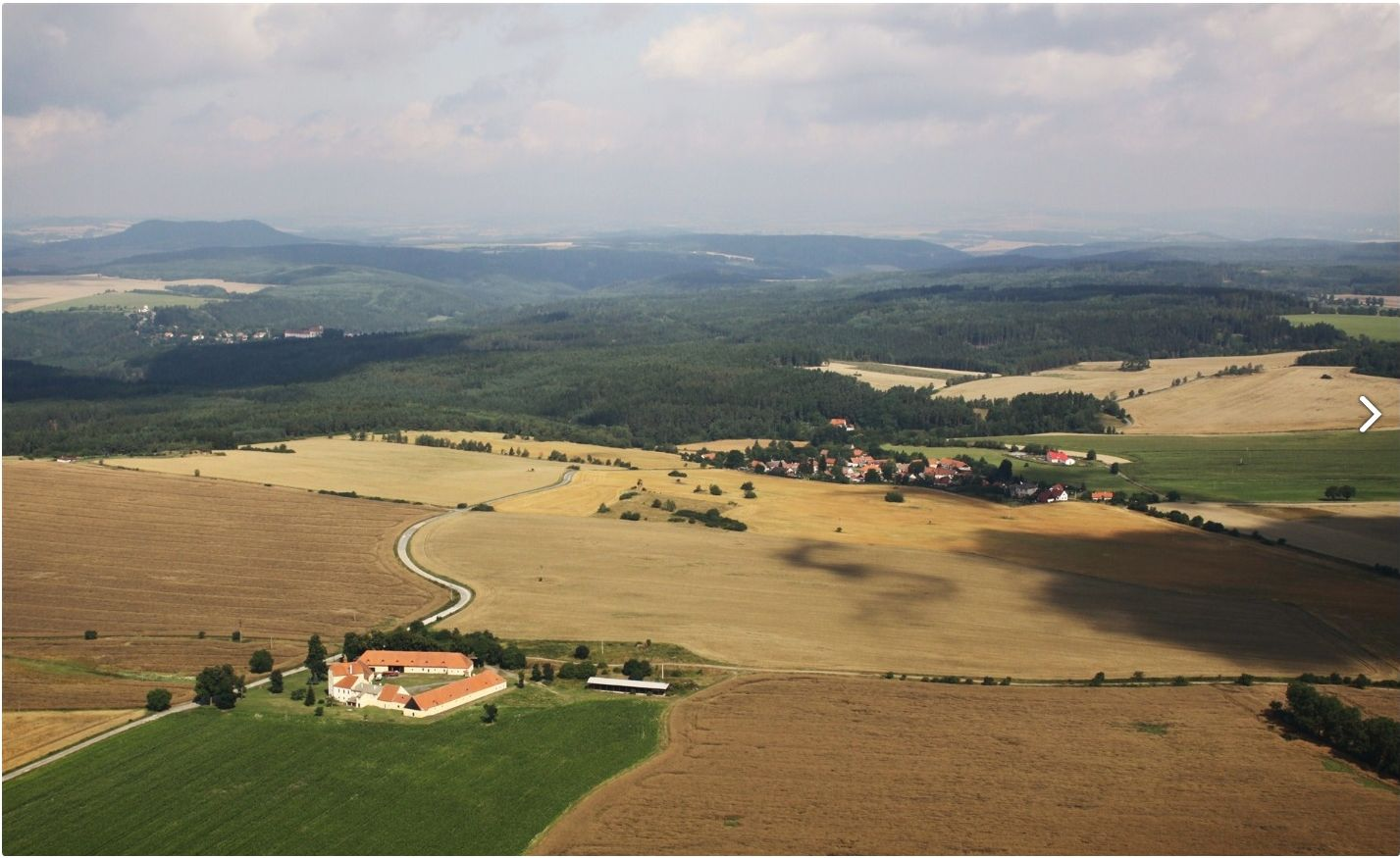
Landscape around Žihle

The terrain is undulating, most of the territory has the character of uplands. The territory extends into three geomorphological mesoregions: Plasy Uplands (most of the territory), Rakovník Uplands (north) and Teplá Highlands (small part in the northwest). The highest point of the district is below the top of the mountain Stěnský vrch in Úterý with an elevation of 756 m (2,480 ft), the lowest point is the river bed of the Berounka in Chříč at 258 m (846 ft).

From the total district area of 1,286.8 km^{2} (496.8 sq mi), agricultural land occupies 647.7 km^{2} (250.1 sq mi), forests occupy 521.0 km^{2} (201.2 sq mi), and water area occupies 16.9 km^{2} (6.5 sq mi). Forests cover 40.5% of the district's area.

The Berounka forms the district border in the east. The longest river in the district is its tributary Střela. The southern part of the district is crossed by the Mže. The territory is poor in bodies of water. The largest body of water is Hracholusky Reservoir, built on the Mže.

There are no large-scale protected areas.

== Demographics ==
Historical population

Year	Pop.	±%
1869	71,213	—
1880	78,964	+10.9%
1890	81,999	+3.8%
1900	83,394	+1.7%
1910	88,349	+5.9%

Year	Pop.	±%
1921	91,270	+3.3%
1930	95,367	+4.5%
1950	69,376	−27.3%
1961	73,598	+6.1%
1970	70,251	−4.5%

Year	Pop.	±%
1980	70,280	+0.0%
1991	68,420	−2.6%
2001	69,015	+0.9%
2011	74,940	+8.6%
2021	79,917	+6.6%

Source: Censuses

=== Most populous municipalities ===
Name	Population	Area (km^{2})
Nýřany	6,994	23
Třemošná	5,112	18
Vejprnice	4,665	10
Horní Bříza	4,041	15
Zruč-Senec	3,522	9
Kralovice	3,450	40
Tlučná	3,427	7
Kaznějov	3,087	12
Zbůch	3,057	9
Plasy	2,888	57

== Economy ==
The largest employers with headquarters in Plzeň-North District and at least 500 employees are:

Economic entity	Location	Number of employees	Main activity
Faurecia Plzeň	Úherce	1,500–1,999	Automotive industry
LB Minerals	Horní Bříza	500–999	Mining of clays and kaolin
NOVEM Car Interior Design	Město Touškov	500–999	Automotive industry
Best	Rybnice	500–999	Manufacture of concrete products
Gühring	Líně	500–999	Manufacture of rotary precision tools for metalworking
Shape Corp. Czech Republic	Nýřany	500–999	Manufacture of parts for motor vehicles

== Transport ==
The D5 motorway (part of the European route E50) from Prague to Plzeň and the Czech–German border runs through the southern part of the district. Another important road in the district is the I/20 (part of European route E49) from Karlovy Vary to Písek via Plzeň.

== Sights ==
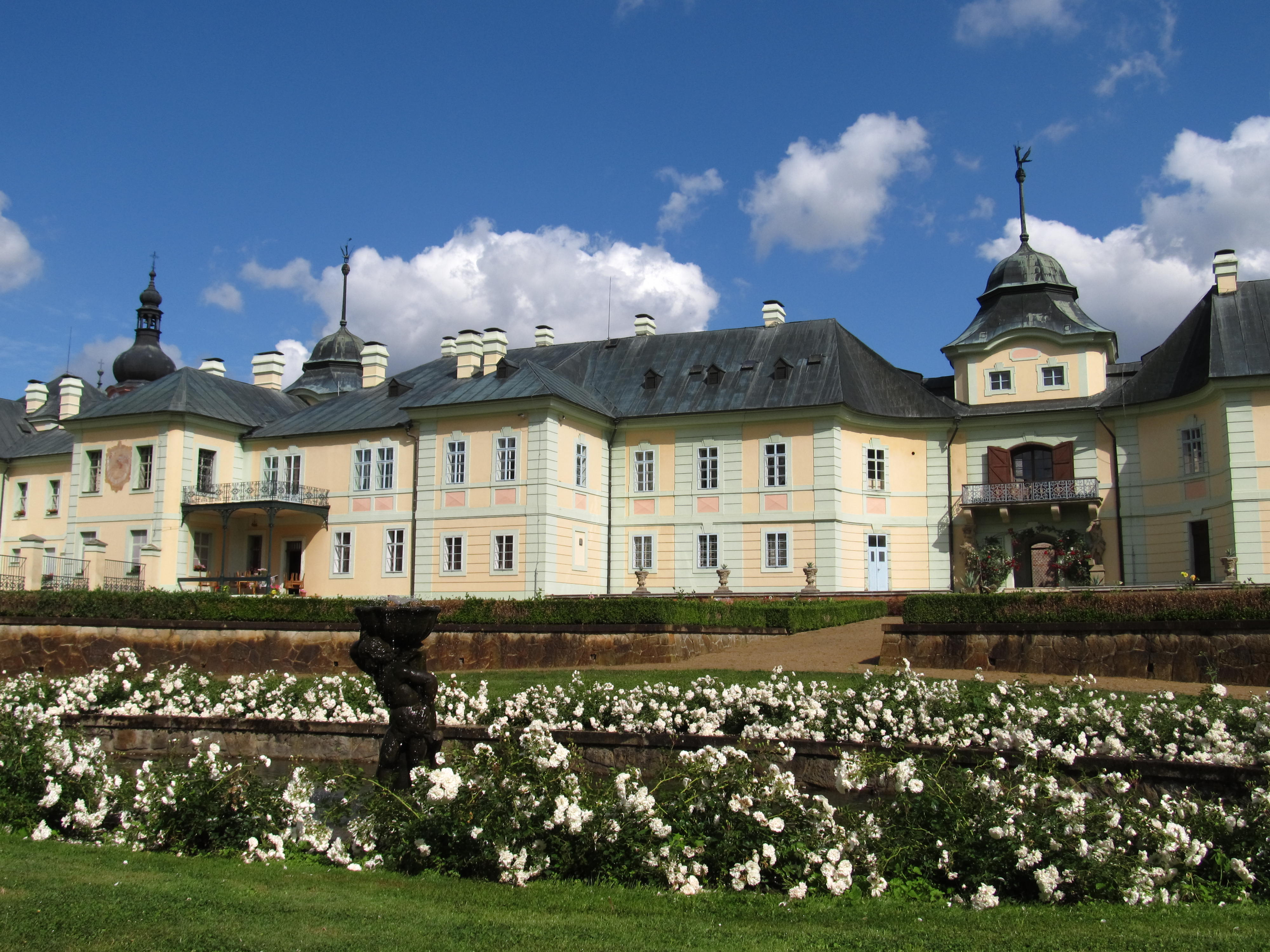
Manětín Castle

The most important monuments in the district, protected as national cultural monuments, are:

- Plasy Monastery
- Manětín Castle
- Mariánská Týnice pilgrimage site with the Church of the Annunciation

The best-preserved settlements and landscapes, protected as monument zones, are:

- Manětín
- Město Touškov
- Rabštejn nad Střelou
- Úterý
- Dolany
- Hlince
- Jarov
- Lhota
- Lochousice
- Nynice
- Olešovice
- Radějov
- Studená
- Plasko landscape

The most visited tourist destination is the Plasy Zoo.
