= Myslinka =

- Municipality
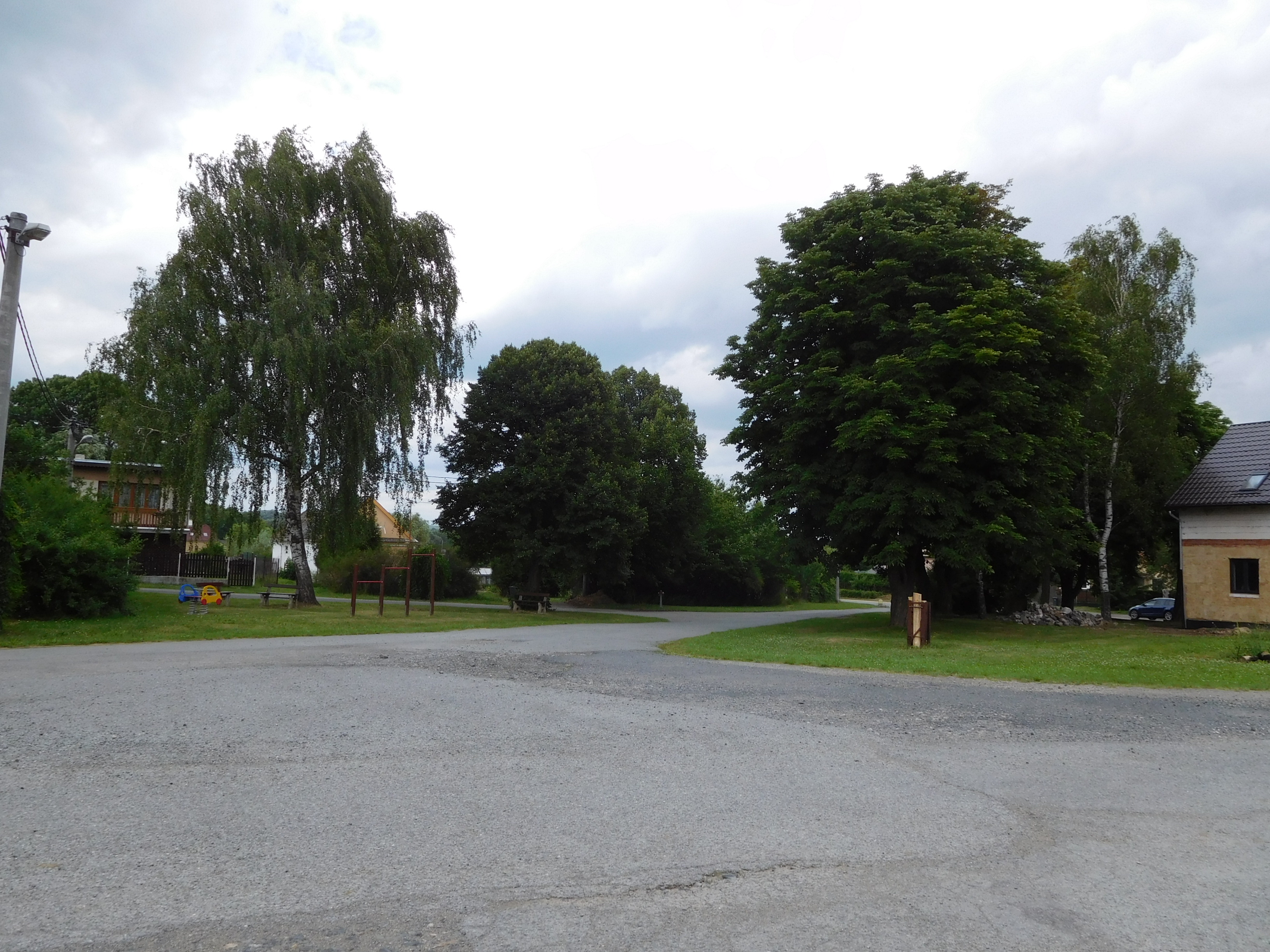
- Centre of Myslinka

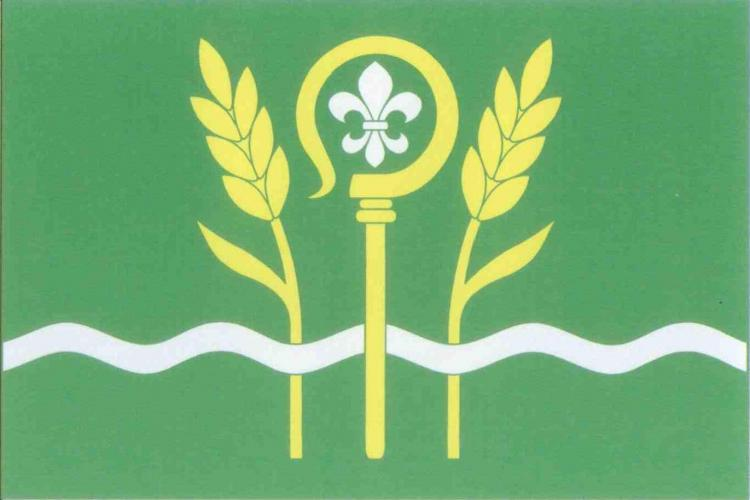
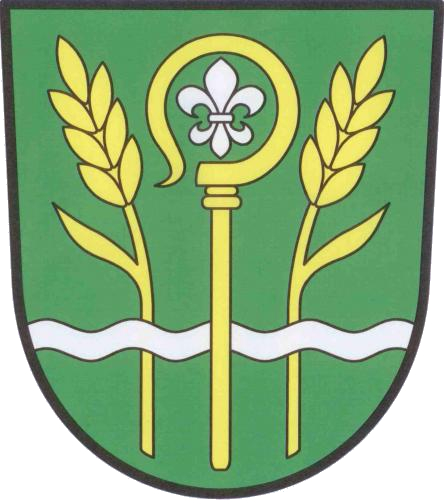
- Flag Coat of arms

- Location in the Czech Republic
- Coordinates: 49°44′53″N 13°13′9″E
- Country: Czech Republic
- Region: Plzeň
- District: Plzeň-North
- First mentioned: 1239

Area
  - Total: 3.70 km^{2} (1.43 sq mi)
- Elevation: 368 m (1,207 ft)

Population (2026-01-01)
  - Total: 268
  - Density: 72.4/km^{2} (188/sq mi)
- Time zone: UTC+1 (CET)
  - Summer (DST): UTC+2 (CEST)
- Postal code: 330 23
- Website: www.myslinka.cz

Myslinka is a municipality and village in Plzeň-North District in the Plzeň Region of the Czech Republic. It has about 300 inhabitants.

Myslinka lies approximately 12 kilometres (7 mi) west of Plzeň and 95 km (59 mi) south-west of Prague.

== Demographics ==
Historical population
| Year | Pop. | ±% |
|---|---|---|
| 1869 | 195 | — |
| 1880 | 193 | −1.0% |
| 1890 | 227 | +17.6% |
| 1900 | 242 | +6.6% |
| 1910 | 241 | −0.4% |
| 1921 | 248 | +2.9% |
| 1930 | 224 | −9.7% |
| 1950 | 146 | −34.8% |
| 1961 | 175 | +19.9% |
| 1970 | 168 | −4.0% |
| 1980 | 176 | +4.8% |
| 1991 | 141 | −19.9% |
| 2001 | 160 | +13.5% |
| 2011 | 144 | −10.0% |
| 2021 | 215 | +49.3% |
Source: Censuses
