= Bohy =

- Municipality
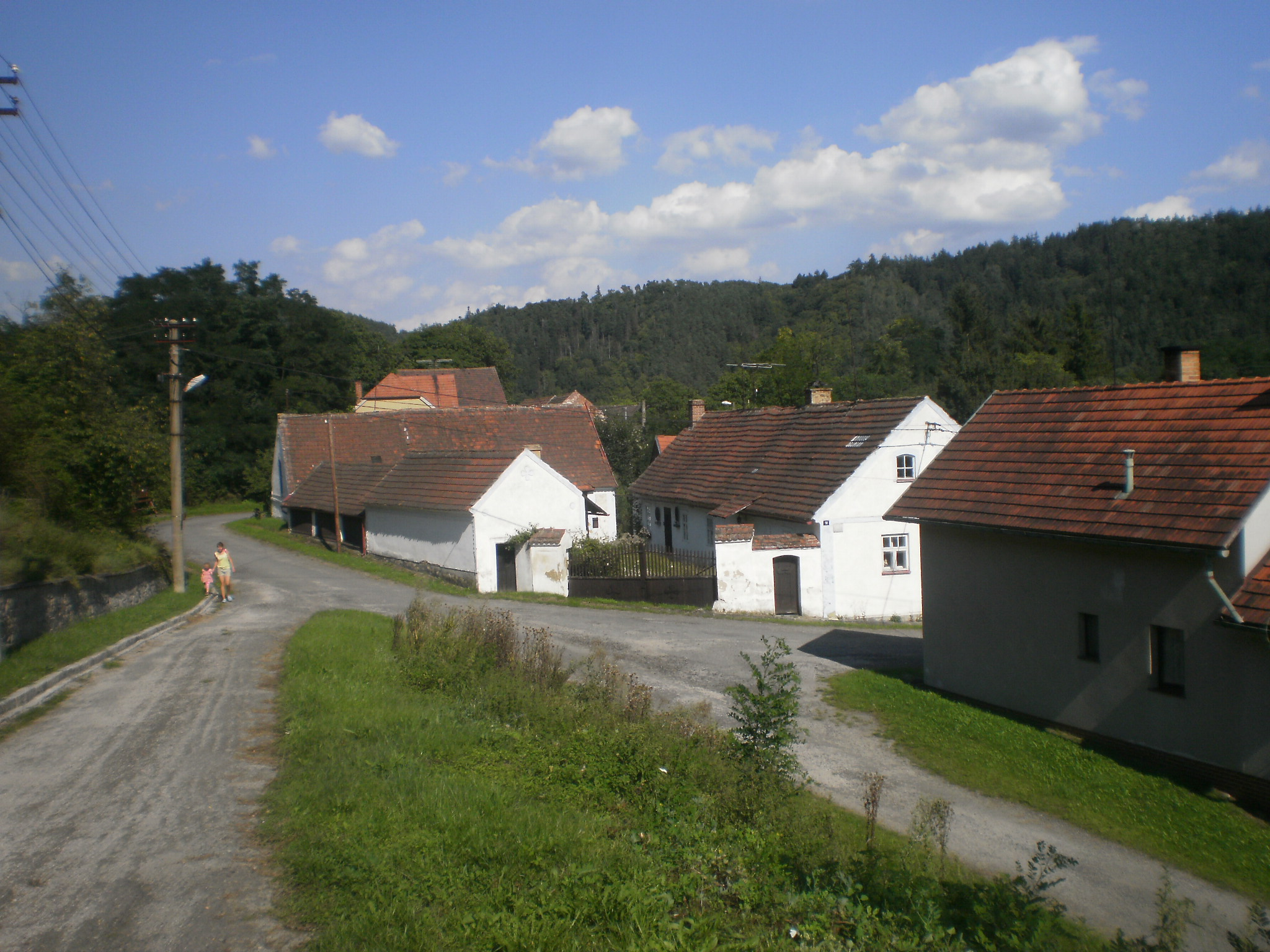
- Rakolusky, a part of Bohy

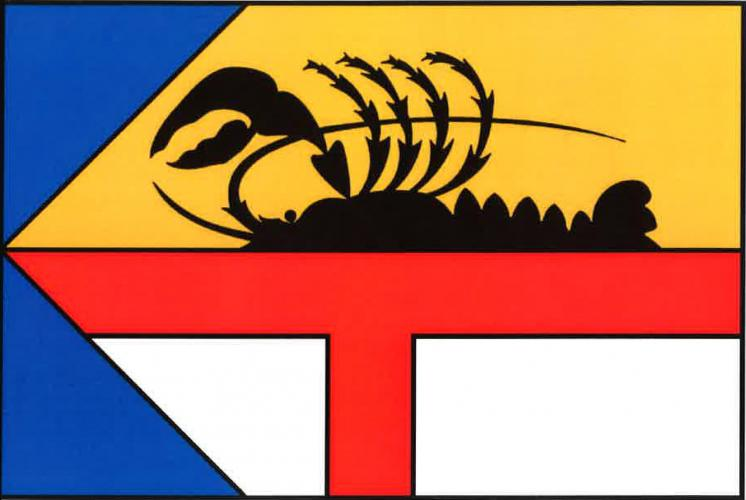
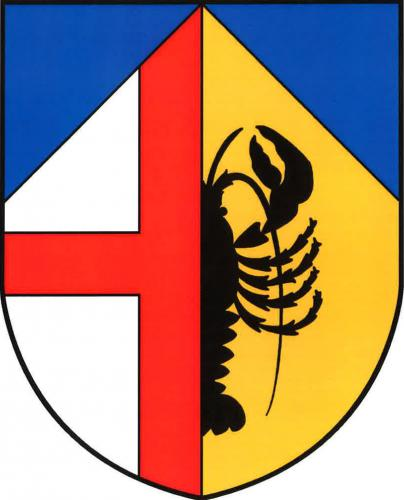
- Flag Coat of arms

- Location in the Czech Republic
- Coordinates: 49°56′17″N 13°34′33″E
- Country: Czech Republic
- Region: Plzeň
- District: Plzeň-North
- First mentioned: 1228

Area
  - Total: 9.26 km^{2} (3.58 sq mi)
- Elevation: 368 m (1,207 ft)

Population (2026-01-01)
  - Total: 113
  - Density: 12.2/km^{2} (31.6/sq mi)
- Time zone: UTC+1 (CET)
  - Summer (DST): UTC+2 (CEST)
- Postal code: 331 41
- Website: www.bohy.cz

Bohy is a municipality and village in Plzeň-North District in the Plzeň Region of the Czech Republic. It has about 100 inhabitants.

== Administrative division ==
Bohy consists of two municipal parts (in brackets population according to the 2021 census):

- Bohy (87)
- Rakolusky (25)

== Demographics ==
Historical population
Year	Pop.	±%
1869	318	—
1880	332	+4.4%
1890	304	−8.4%
1900	302	−0.7%
1910	294	−2.6%
1921	287	−2.4%
1930	237	−17.4%
1950	203	−14.3%
1961	171	−15.8%
1970	127	−25.7%
1980	95	−25.2%
1991	80	−15.8%
2001	69	−13.7%
2011	103	+49.3%
2021	112	+8.7%
Source: Censuses
