= Velečín =

- Municipality
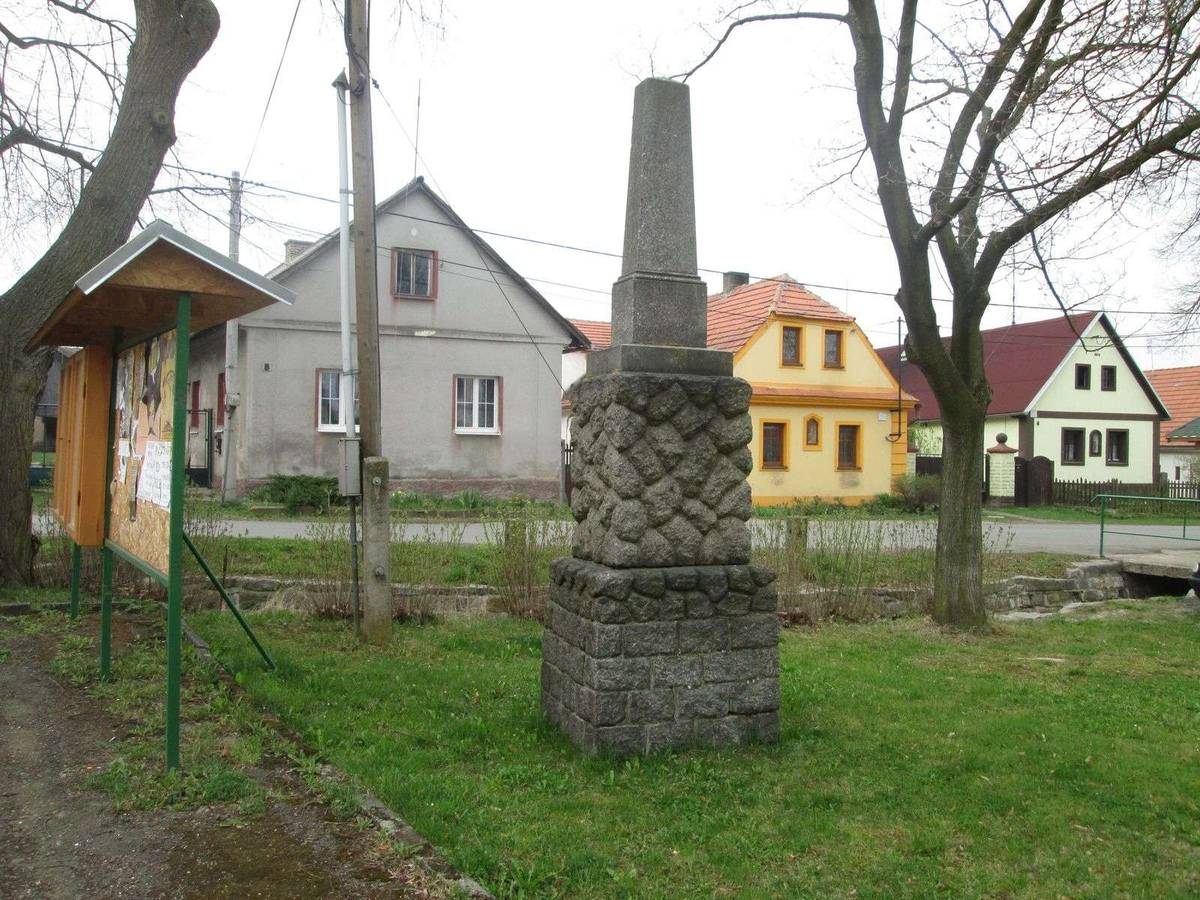
- Monument to Wenzel Tauber

- Location in the Czech Republic
- Coordinates: 50°4′28″N 13°24′6″E
- Country: Czech Republic
- Region: Plzeň
- District: Plzeň-North
- First mentioned: 1296

Area
  - Total: 5.25 km^{2} (2.03 sq mi)
- Elevation: 438 m (1,437 ft)

Population (2026-01-01)
  - Total: 71
  - Density: 14/km^{2} (35/sq mi)
- Time zone: UTC+1 (CET)
  - Summer (DST): UTC+2 (CEST)
- Postal code: 331 65
- Website: www.velecin.cz

Velečín (German: Weletschin) is a municipality and village in Plzeň-North District in the Plzeň Region of the Czech Republic. It has about 70 inhabitants.

Velečín lies approximately 37 kilometres (23 mi) north of Plzeň and 73 km (45 mi) west of Prague.

== Administrative division ==
Velečín consists of two municipal parts (in brackets population according to the 2021 census):

- Velečín (70)
- Ostrovec (10)

== Demographics ==
Historical population
| Year | Pop. | ±% |
|---|---|---|
| 1869 | 267 | — |
| 1880 | 264 | −1.1% |
| 1890 | 244 | −7.6% |
| 1900 | 239 | −2.0% |
| 1910 | 264 | +10.5% |
| 1921 | 279 | +5.7% |
| 1930 | 310 | +11.1% |
| 1950 | 179 | −42.3% |
| 1961 | 166 | −7.3% |
| 1970 | 142 | −14.5% |
| 1980 | 108 | −23.9% |
| 1991 | 73 | −32.4% |
| 2001 | 69 | −5.5% |
| 2011 | 58 | −15.9% |
| 2021 | 80 | +37.9% |
Source: Censuses
