= Bdeněves =

- Municipality
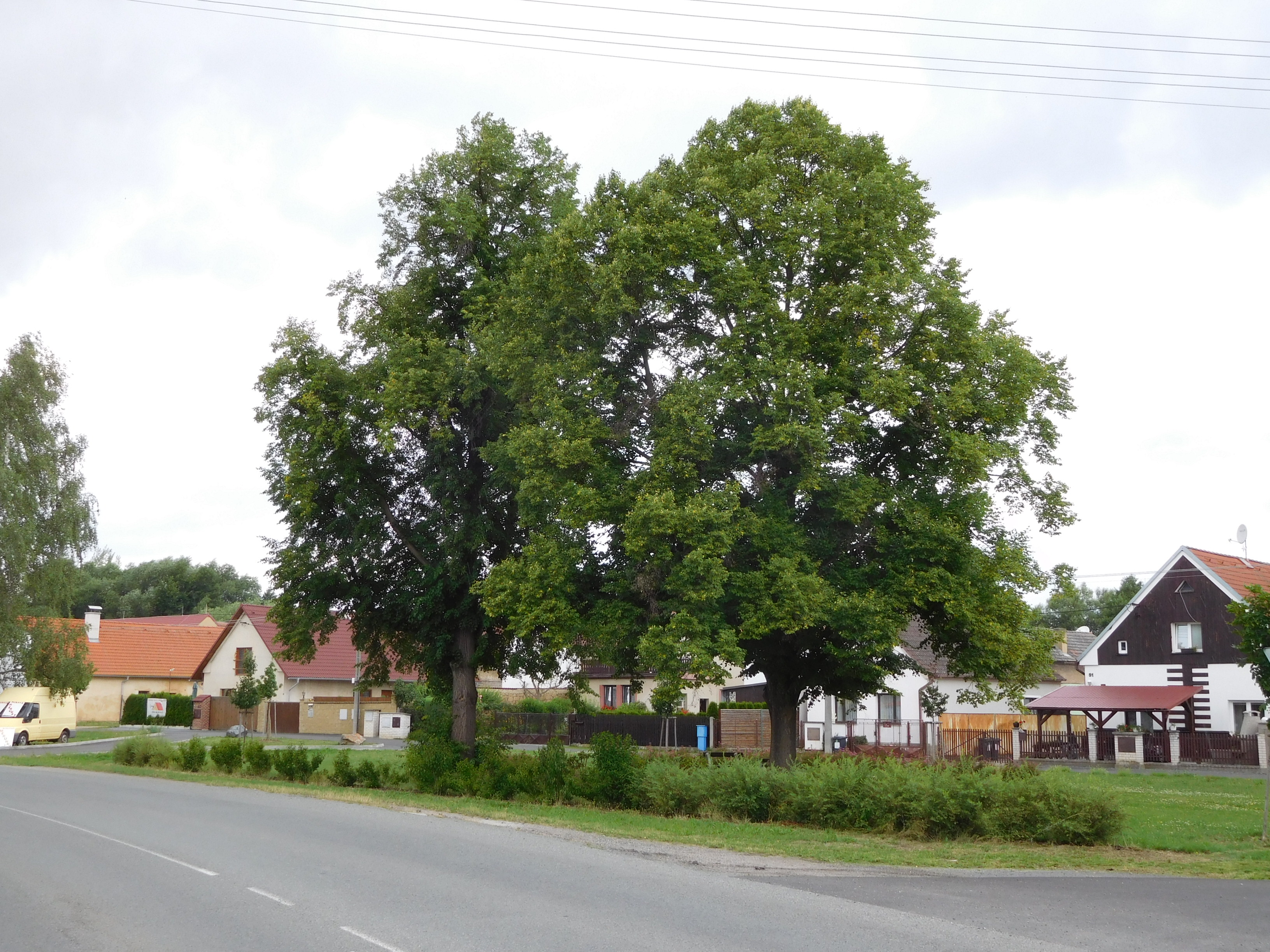
- Common in Bdeněves

- Flag Coat of arms

- Location in the Czech Republic
- Coordinates: 49°46′11″N 13°14′7″E
- Country: Czech Republic
- Region: Plzeň
- District: Plzeň-North
- First mentioned: 1197

Area
  - Total: 4.76 km^{2} (1.84 sq mi)
- Elevation: 327 m (1,073 ft)

Population (2026-01-01)
  - Total: 815
  - Density: 171/km^{2} (443/sq mi)
- Time zone: UTC+1 (CET)
  - Summer (DST): UTC+2 (CEST)
- Postal code: 330 32
- Website: www.bdeneves.cz

Bdeněves (German: Wenussen) is a municipality and village in Plzeň-North District in the Plzeň Region of the Czech Republic. It has about 800 inhabitants.

Bdeněves lies approximately 11 kilometres (7 mi) west of Plzeň and 93 km (58 mi) south-west of Prague.

== Demographics ==
Historical population
Year	Pop.	±%
1869	420	—
1880	410	−2.4%
1890	395	−3.7%
1900	405	+2.5%
1910	467	+15.3%
1921	494	+5.8%
1930	575	+16.4%
1950	450	−21.7%
1961	441	−2.0%
1970	425	−3.6%
1980	426	+0.2%
1991	414	−2.8%
2001	387	−6.5%
2011	626	+61.8%
2021	770	+23.0%
Source: Censuses
