= Brodeslavy =

- Municipality
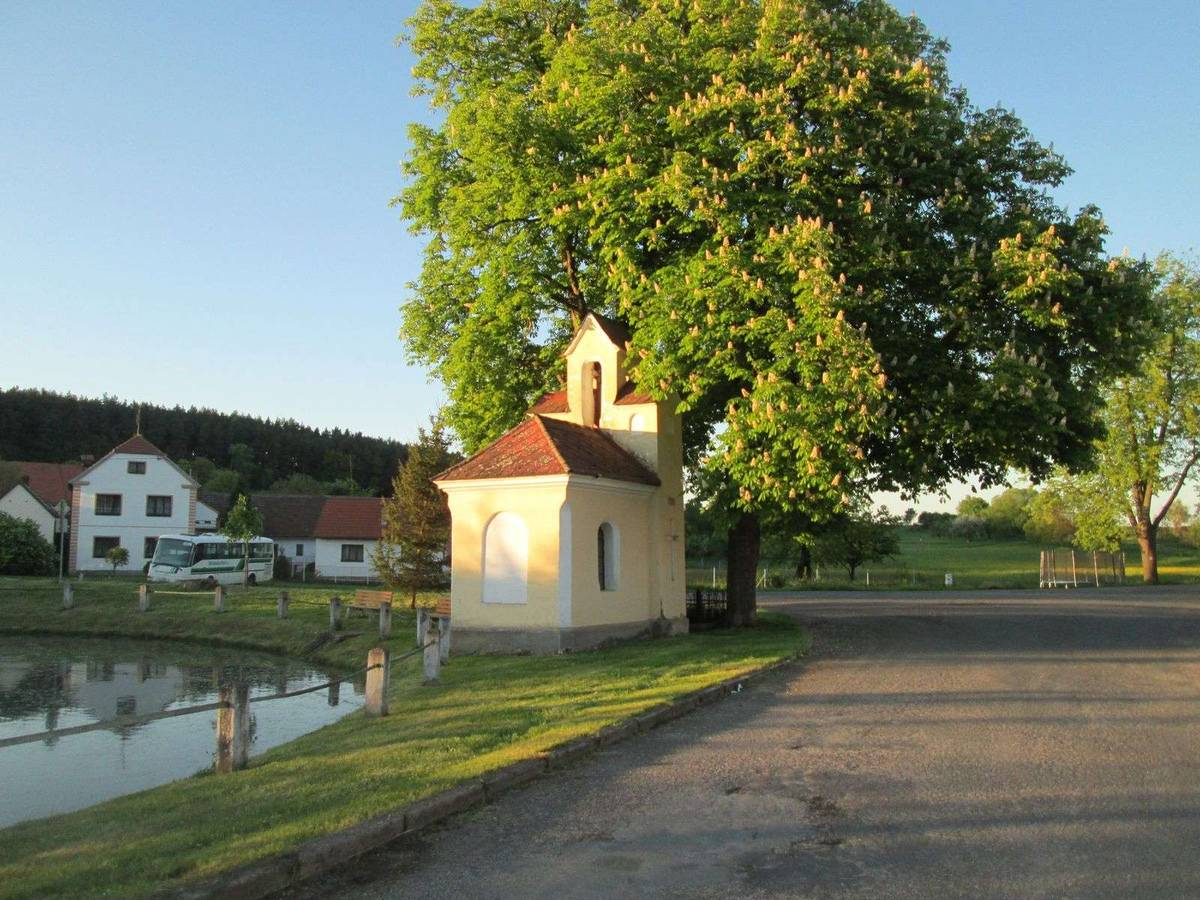
- Chapel of Saint Procopius

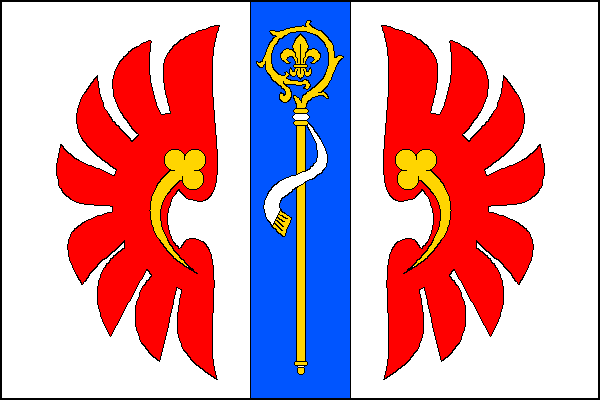
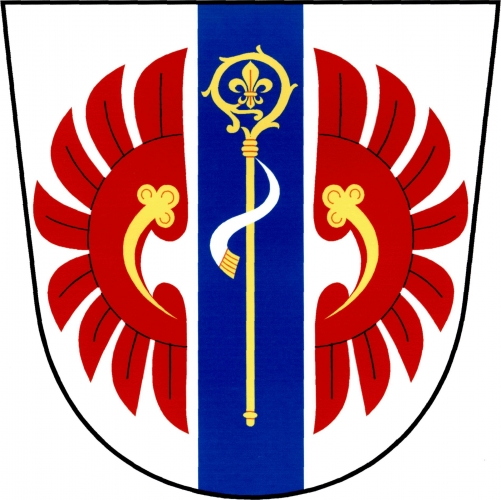
- Flag Coat of arms

- Location in the Czech Republic
- Coordinates: 49°57′14″N 13°33′25″E
- Country: Czech Republic
- Region: Plzeň
- District: Plzeň-North
- First mentioned: 1144

Area
  - Total: 2.62 km^{2} (1.01 sq mi)
- Elevation: 392 m (1,286 ft)

Population (2026-01-01)
  - Total: 71
  - Density: 27/km^{2} (70/sq mi)
- Time zone: UTC+1 (CET)
  - Summer (DST): UTC+2 (CEST)
- Postal code: 331 41
- Website: www.brodeslavy.cz

Brodeslavy is a municipality and village in Plzeň-North District in the Plzeň Region of the Czech Republic. It has about 70 inhabitants.

Brodeslavy lies approximately 27 kilometres (17 mi) north-east of Plzeň and 64 km (40 mi) west of Prague.

== Demographics ==
Historical population
Year	Pop.	±%
1869	129	—
1880	156	+20.9%
1890	130	−16.7%
1900	133	+2.3%
1910	152	+14.3%
1921	163	+7.2%
1930	140	−14.1%
1950	132	−5.7%
1961	95	−28.0%
1970	71	−25.3%
1980	74	+4.2%
1991	79	+6.8%
2001	78	−1.3%
2011	76	−2.6%
2021	67	−11.8%
Source: Censuses
