= Lochousice =

- Municipality
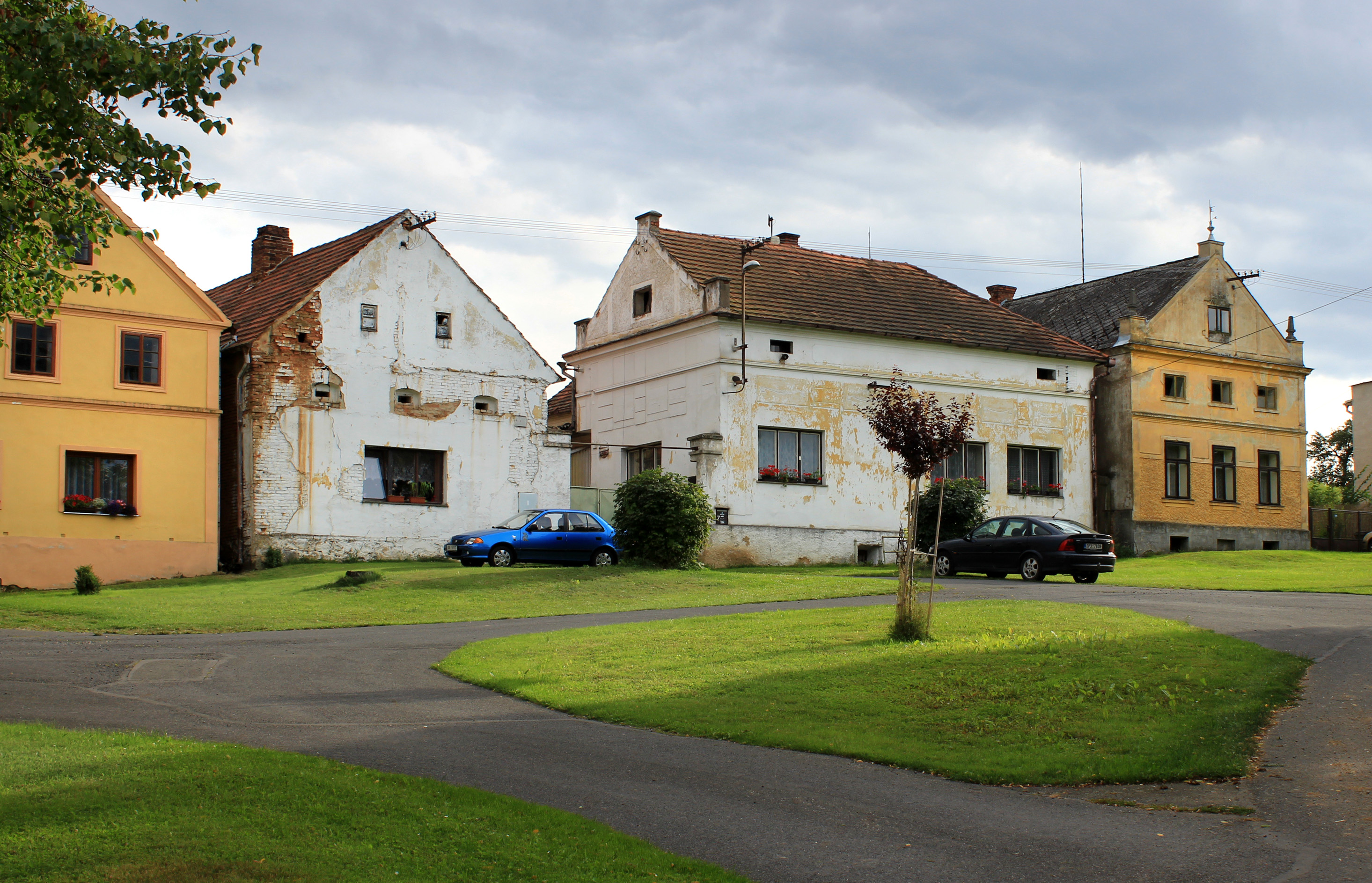
- Centre of Lochousice

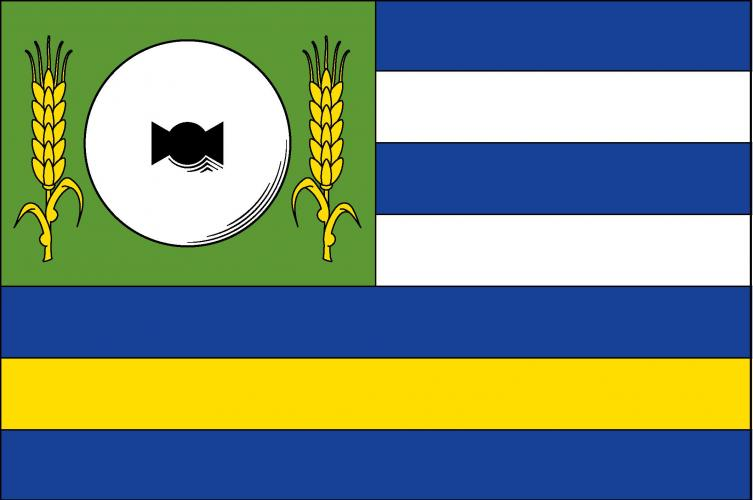
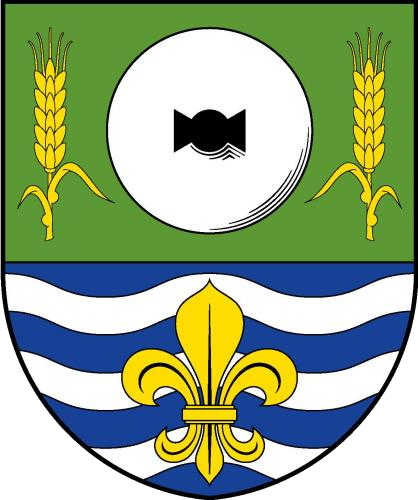
- Flag Coat of arms

- Location in the Czech Republic
- Coordinates: 49°40′31″N 13°5′26″E
- Country: Czech Republic
- Region: Plzeň
- District: Plzeň-North
- First mentioned: 1186

Area
  - Total: 10.62 km^{2} (4.10 sq mi)
- Elevation: 398 m (1,306 ft)

Population (2026-01-01)
  - Total: 129
  - Density: 12.1/km^{2} (31.5/sq mi)
- Time zone: UTC+1 (CET)
  - Summer (DST): UTC+2 (CEST)
- Postal code: 330 23
- Website: www.lochousice.cz

Lochousice is a municipality and village in Plzeň-North District in the Plzeň Region of the Czech Republic. It has about 100 inhabitants.

Lochousice is located approximately 22 kilometres (14 mi) west of Plzeň and 106 km (66 mi) south-west of Prague.

== Demographics ==
Historical population
Year	Pop.	±%
1869	259	—
1880	280	+8.1%
1890	333	+18.9%
1900	337	+1.2%
1910	324	−3.9%
1921	312	−3.7%
1930	303	−2.9%
1950	192	−36.6%
1961	169	−12.0%
1970	158	−6.5%
1980	127	−19.6%
1991	93	−26.8%
2001	111	+19.4%
2011	103	−7.2%
2021	111	+7.8%
Source: Censuses
