= Pastuchovice =

- Municipality
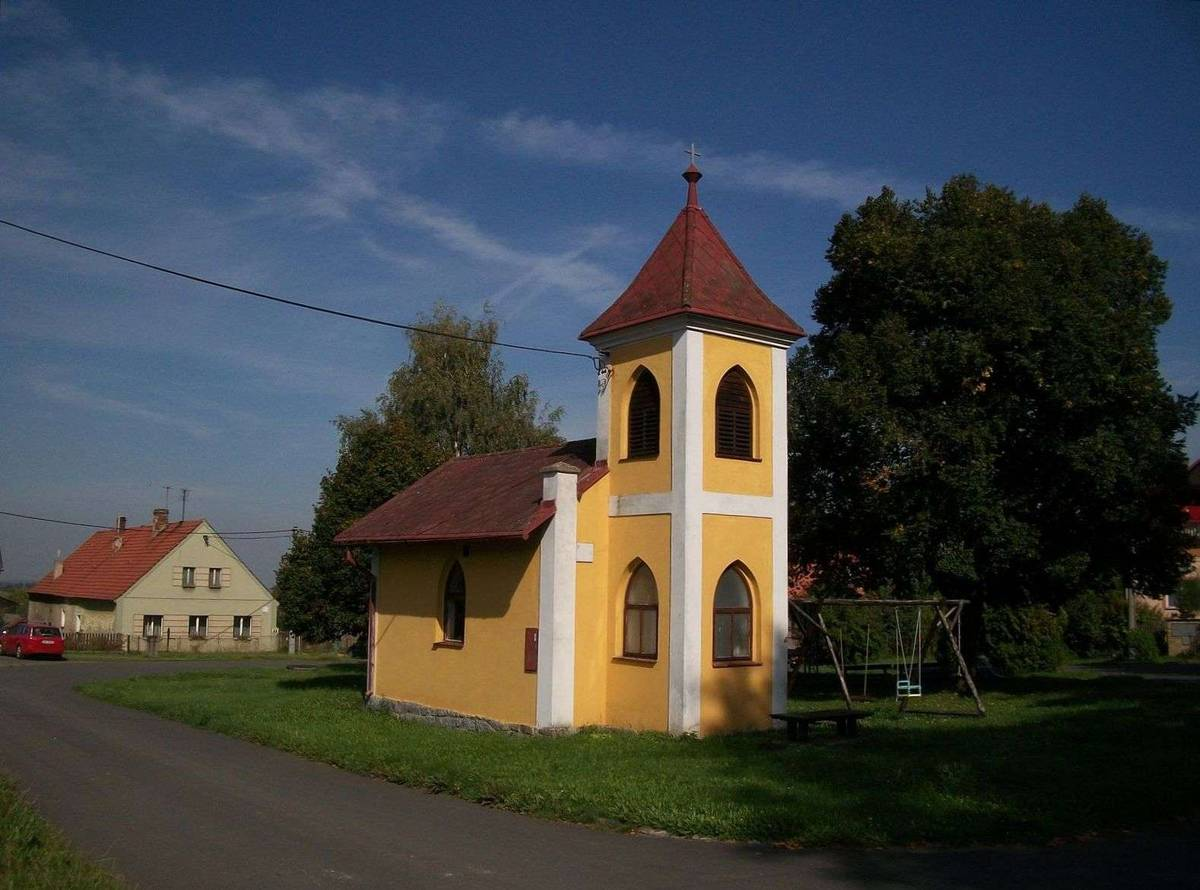
- Chapel in Pastuchovice

- Location in the Czech Republic
- Coordinates: 50°4′9″N 13°22′56″E
- Country: Czech Republic
- Region: Plzeň
- District: Plzeň-North
- First mentioned: 1558

Area
  - Total: 8.24 km^{2} (3.18 sq mi)
- Elevation: 467 m (1,532 ft)

Population (2026-01-01)
  - Total: 75
  - Density: 9.1/km^{2} (24/sq mi)
- Time zone: UTC+1 (CET)
  - Summer (DST): UTC+2 (CEST)
- Postal code: 331 65
- Website: www.pastuchovice.cz

Pastuchovice (German: Pastuchowitz) is a municipality and village in Plzeň-North District in the Plzeň Region of the Czech Republic. It has about 80 inhabitants.

Pastuchovice lies approximately 36 kilometres (22 mi) north of Plzeň and 75 km (47 mi) west of Prague.

== Demographics ==
Historical population
Year	Pop.	±%
1869	297	—
1880	351	+18.2%
1890	320	−8.8%
1900	317	−0.9%
1910	309	−2.5%
1921	356	+15.2%
1930	376	+5.6%
1950	154	−59.0%
1961	205	+33.1%
1970	190	−7.3%
1980	150	−21.1%
1991	97	−35.3%
2001	79	−18.6%
2011	74	−6.3%
2021	68	−8.1%
Source: Censuses
