= Čeminy =

- Municipality
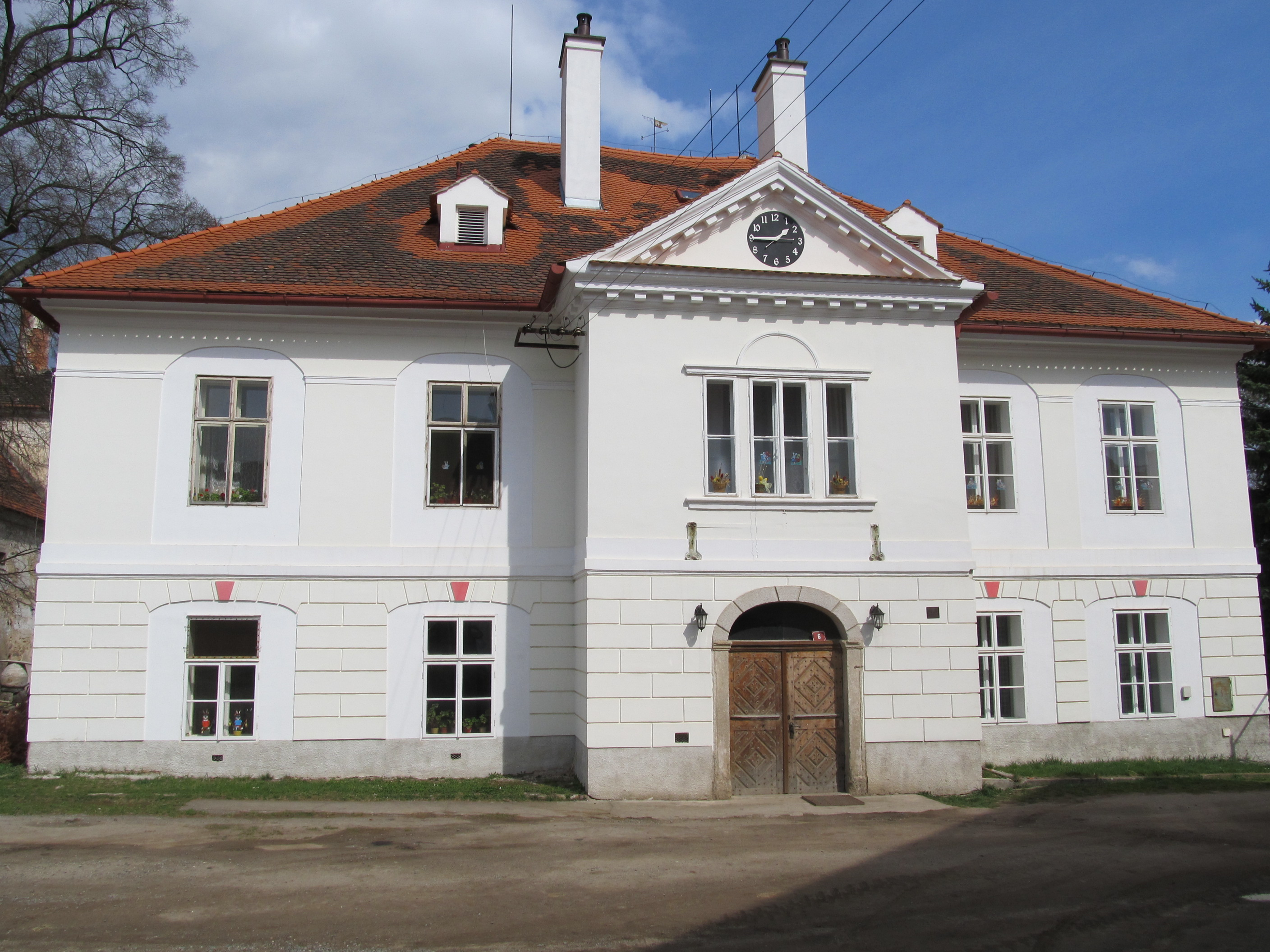
- Čeminy Castle

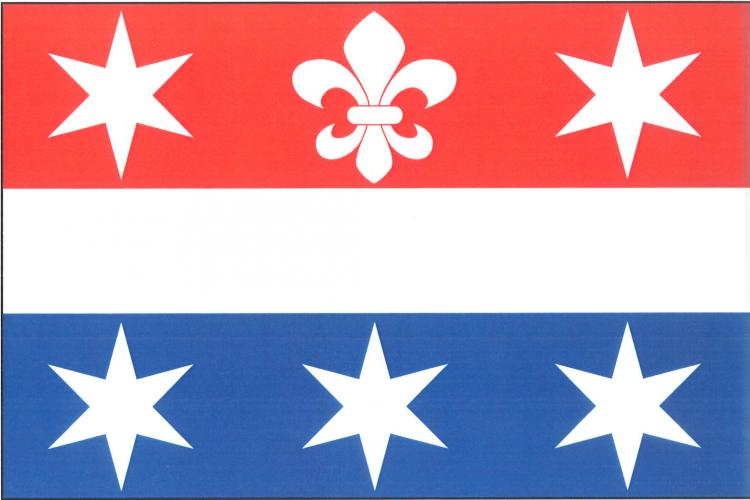
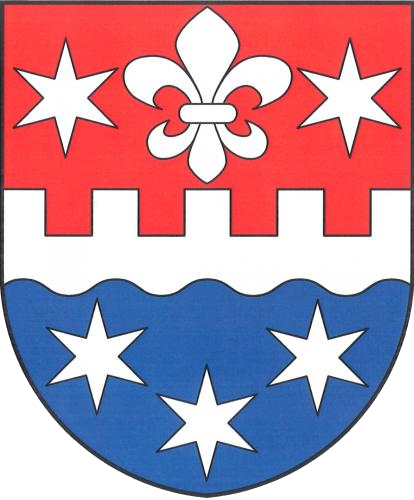
- Flag Coat of arms

- Location in the Czech Republic
- Coordinates: 49°48′0″N 13°15′11″E
- Country: Czech Republic
- Region: Plzeň
- District: Plzeň-North
- First mentioned: 1239

Area
  - Total: 10.44 km^{2} (4.03 sq mi)
- Elevation: 352 m (1,155 ft)

Population (2026-01-01)
  - Total: 343
  - Density: 32.9/km^{2} (85.1/sq mi)
- Time zone: UTC+1 (CET)
  - Summer (DST): UTC+2 (CEST)
- Postal code: 330 33
- Website: www.ceminy.cz

Čeminy is a municipality and village in Plzeň-North District in the Plzeň Region of the Czech Republic. It has about 300 inhabitants.

Čeminy lies approximately 11 kilometres (7 mi) north-west of Plzeň and 90 km (56 mi) west of Prague.

== Demographics ==
Historical population
| Year | Pop. | ±% |
|---|---|---|
| 1869 | 586 | — |
| 1880 | 652 | +11.3% |
| 1890 | 625 | −4.1% |
| 1900 | 539 | −13.8% |
| 1910 | 561 | +4.1% |
| 1921 | 574 | +2.3% |
| 1930 | 536 | −6.6% |
| 1950 | 338 | −36.9% |
| 1961 | 402 | +18.9% |
| 1970 | 368 | −8.5% |
| 1980 | 268 | −27.2% |
| 1991 | 258 | −3.7% |
| 2001 | 225 | −12.8% |
| 2011 | 256 | +13.8% |
| 2021 | 322 | +25.8% |
Source: Censuses
