= Rybnice =

- Municipality
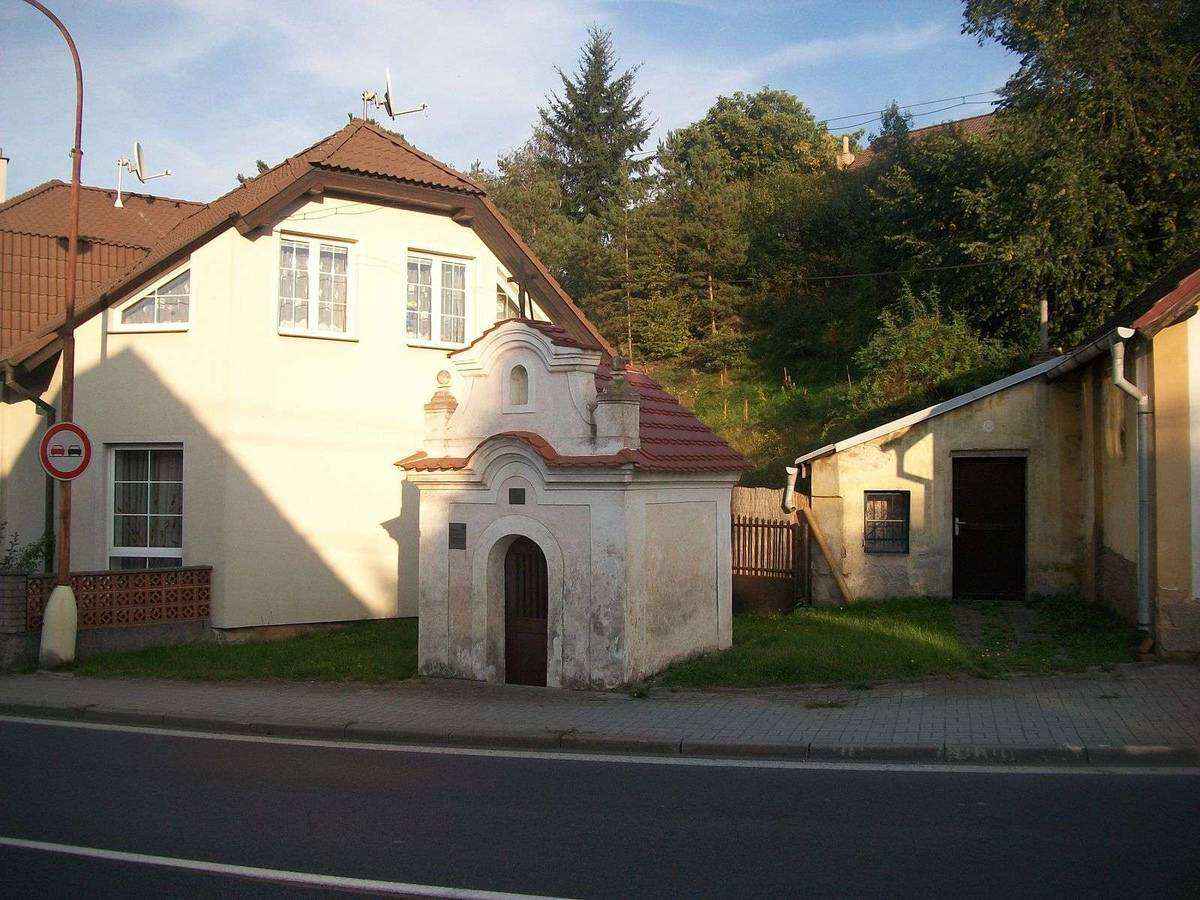
- Chapel in Rybnice

- Location in the Czech Republic
- Coordinates: 49°54′30″N 13°22′26″E
- Country: Czech Republic
- Region: Plzeň
- District: Plzeň-North
- First mentioned: 1193

Area
  - Total: 5.25 km^{2} (2.03 sq mi)
- Elevation: 434 m (1,424 ft)

Population (2026-01-01)
  - Total: 629
  - Density: 120/km^{2} (310/sq mi)
- Time zone: UTC+1 (CET)
  - Summer (DST): UTC+2 (CEST)
- Postal code: 331 51
- Website: www.rybnice.cz

Rybnice is a municipality and village in Plzeň-North District in the Plzeň Region of the Czech Republic. It has about 600 inhabitants.

Rybnice lies approximately 18 kilometres (11 mi) north of Plzeň and 78 km (48 mi) west of Prague.

== Demographics ==
Historical population
| Year | Pop. | ±% |
|---|---|---|
| 1869 | 367 | — |
| 1880 | 333 | −9.3% |
| 1890 | 361 | +8.4% |
| 1900 | 342 | −5.3% |
| 1910 | 388 | +13.5% |
| 1921 | 432 | +11.3% |
| 1930 | 500 | +15.7% |
| 1950 | 436 | −12.8% |
| 1961 | 490 | +12.4% |
| 1970 | 471 | −3.9% |
| 1980 | 411 | −12.7% |
| 1991 | 403 | −1.9% |
| 2001 | 415 | +3.0% |
| 2011 | 496 | +19.5% |
| 2021 | 591 | +19.2% |
Source: Censuses
