= Všehrdy (Plzeň-North District) =

- Municipality
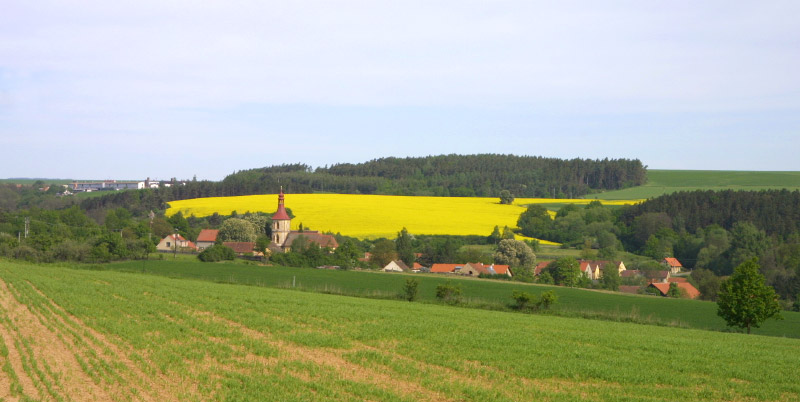
- View from the southeast

- Location in the Czech Republic
- Coordinates: 49°47′50″N 13°35′6″E
- Country: Czech Republic
- Region: Plzeň
- District: Plzeň-North
- First mentioned: 1229

Area
  - Total: 5.51 km^{2} (2.13 sq mi)
- Elevation: 371 m (1,217 ft)

Population (2026-01-01)
  - Total: 56
  - Density: 10/km^{2} (26/sq mi)
- Time zone: UTC+1 (CET)
  - Summer (DST): UTC+2 (CEST)
- Postal code: 331 41
- Website: www.obecvsehrdy.cz

Všehrdy is a municipality and village in Plzeň-North District in the Plzeň Region of the Czech Republic. It has about 60 inhabitants.

Všehrdy lies approximately 29 kilometres (18 mi) north-east of Plzeň and 62 km (39 mi) west of Prague.

== Demographics ==
Historical population
Year	Pop.	±%
1869	248	—
1880	246	−0.8%
1890	220	−10.6%
1900	231	+5.0%
1910	217	−6.1%
1921	199	−8.3%
1930	197	−1.0%
1950	126	−36.0%
1961	112	−11.1%
1970	90	−19.6%
1980	82	−8.9%
1991	62	−24.4%
2001	46	−25.8%
2011	51	+10.9%
2021	53	+3.9%
Source: Censuses
