= Holovousy (Plzeň-North District) =

- Municipality
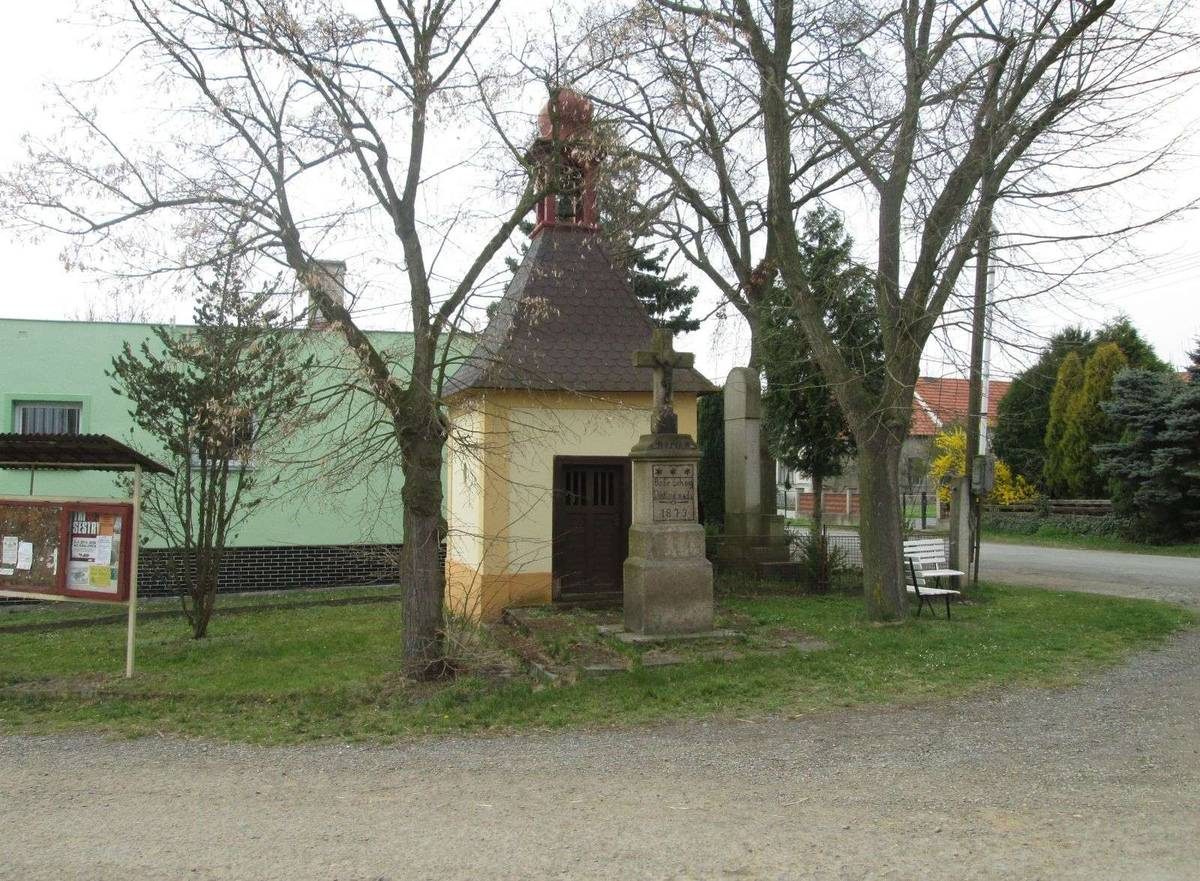
- Centre of Holovousy

- Location in the Czech Republic
- Coordinates: 49°58′5″N 13°36′53″E
- Country: Czech Republic
- Region: Plzeň
- District: Plzeň-North
- First mentioned: 1293

Area
  - Total: 4.68 km^{2} (1.81 sq mi)
- Elevation: 388 m (1,273 ft)

Population (2026-01-01)
  - Total: 60
  - Density: 13/km^{2} (33/sq mi)
- Time zone: UTC+1 (CET)
  - Summer (DST): UTC+2 (CEST)
- Postal code: 331 41
- Website: www.obec-holovousy.cz

Holovousy is a municipality and village in Plzeň-North District in the Plzeň Region of the Czech Republic. It has about 60 inhabitants.

Holovousy lies approximately 30 kilometres (19 mi) north-east of Plzeň and 60 km (37 mi) west of Prague.

== Demographics ==
Historical population
Year	Pop.	±%
1869	217	—
1880	214	−1.4%
1890	212	−0.9%
1900	202	−4.7%
1910	186	−7.9%
1921	192	+3.2%
1930	161	−16.1%
1950	107	−33.5%
1961	103	−3.7%
1970	93	−9.7%
1980	86	−7.5%
1991	80	−7.0%
2001	65	−18.8%
2011	56	−13.8%
2021	53	−5.4%
Source: Censuses
