= Plzeň agglomeration =

Area of the Czech Republic

Plzeň agglomeration Plzeňská aglomerace
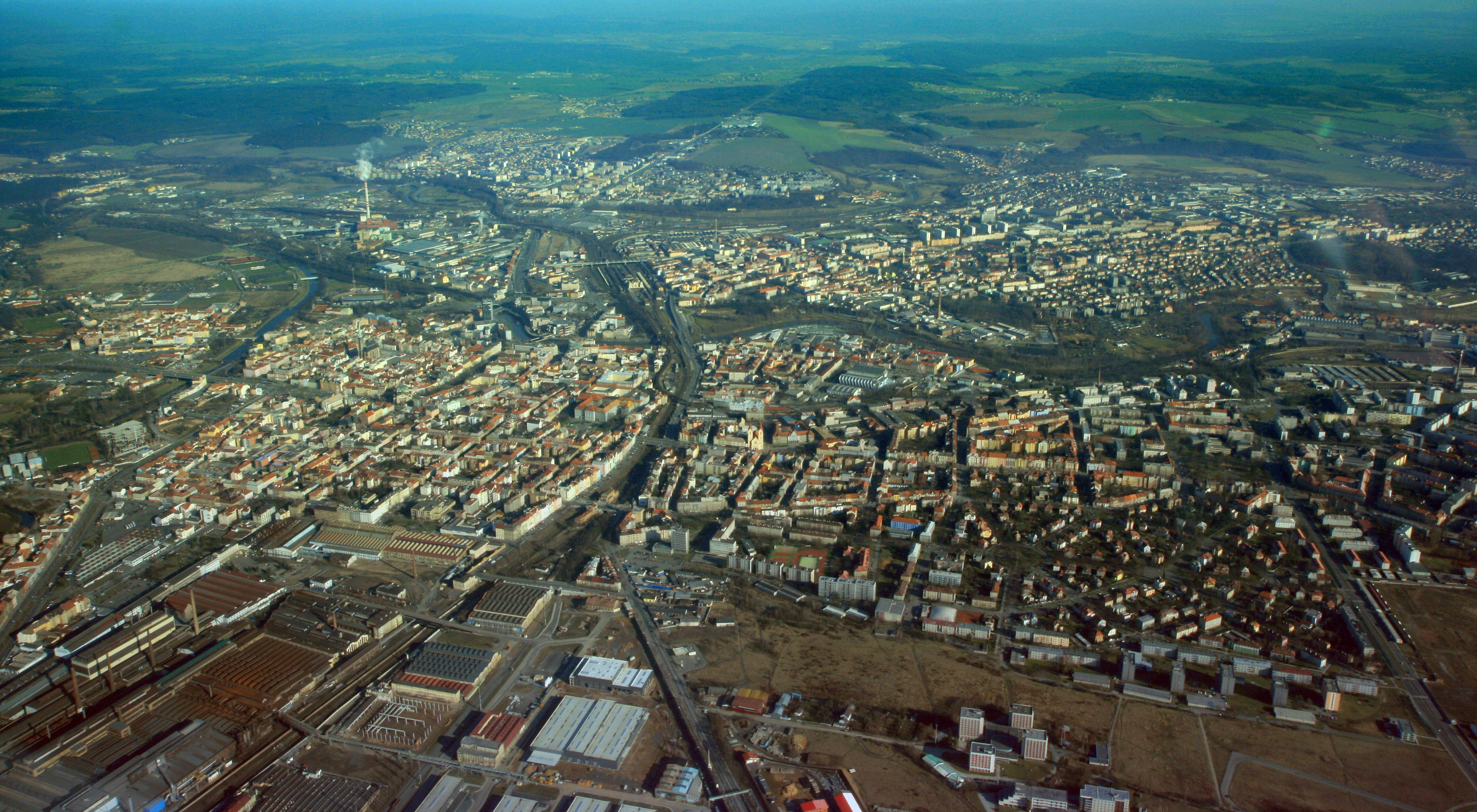
- Aerial view of Plzeň
- Country: Czech Republic
- Region: Plzeň
- Largest city: Plzeň

Area
  - Total: 1,323 km^{2} (511 sq mi)

Population (2024)
  - Total: 328,424
  - Density: 248.2/km^{2} (642.9/sq mi)
- Time zone: UTC+1 (CET)
  - Summer (DST): UTC+2 (CEST)

The Plzeň agglomeration (Czech: Plzeňská aglomerace) is the agglomeration of the city of Plzeň and its surroundings in the Czech Republic. It was defined in 2020 as a tool for drawing money from the European Structural and Investment Funds and is valid in 2021–2027. The agglomeration has a population of about 328,000.

== Definition ==
The Plzeň agglomeration was defined in 2020 by the Ministry of Regional Development of the Czech Republic for the purposes of the so-called Integrated Territorial Investment (ITI), which is a tool for drawing money from the European Structural and Investment Funds.

The territory was defined on the basis of a coefficient composed of three methods: integrated system of centres (i.e. delineation of commuting flows based on mobile operator data from 2019), time spent in core cities (based on mobile operator data from 2019) and residential suburbanization zones (based on statistics of realized housing construction and directional migration from the core of the agglomeration to suburban municipalities in the period 2009–2016). The scope of the territory is valid for the period 2021–2027.

== Municipalities ==
The agglomeration includes 108 municipalities.

Name	Population (2024)
Bdeněves	806
Blažim	65
Blovice	4,196
Bučí	181
Bušovice	635
Čeminy	316
Čerňovice	199
Česká Bříza	600
Chlum	240
Chlumčany	2,431
Chotěšov	3,086
Chotíkov	1,296
Chrást	1,923
Chválenice	786
Čižice	558
Dobřany	6,435
Dobříč	421
Dolany	297
Dolní Bělá	459
Dolní Lukavice	1,105
Druztová	804
Dýšina	1,976
Ejpovice	799
Horní Bělá	601
Horní Bříza	4,191
Horní Lukavice	498
Hromnice	1,328
Hůrky	235
Jarov	145
Kaceřov	153
Kakejcov	102
Kaznějov	3,112
Kbelany	131
Klabava	523
Kornatice	283
Kozolupy	1,105
Krašovice	361
Krsy	268
Kunějovice	177
Kyšice	1,102
Ledce	889
Letkov	877
Lhůta	207
Líně	2,877
Líšťany	780
Líté	208
Litohlavy	560
Losiná	1,423
Loza	262
Lužany	683
Město Touškov	2,407
Mešno	85
Milínov	218
Mokrouše	333
Mrtník	344
Myslinka	272
Nadryby	135
Nebílovy	382
Nečtiny	624
Nekmíř	540
Netunice	213
Nevid	187
Nevřeň	305
Nezbavětice	270
Nezvěstice	1,454
Nová Ves	301
Nýřany	6,960
Osek	1,417
Plešnice	289
Plzeň	185,599
Pňovany	505
Předenice	263
Přeštice	6,804
Příchovice	1,204
Příšov	334
Řenče	919
Rokycany	14,386
Seč	330
Smědčice	312
Spálené Poříčí	2,997
Šťáhlavy	2,922
Starý Plzenec	5,448
Štěnovice	2,329
Štěnovický Borek	621
Stod	3,628
Střížovice	375
Svojkovice	465
Tatiná	253
Tlučná	3,357
Třemošná	5,051
Trnová	987
Tymákov	1,072
Úherce	421
Újezd nade Mží	113
Úlice	452
Útušice	724
Vejprnice	4,593
Vlčtejn	102
Vochov	1,614
Všenice	288
Všeruby	1,700
Vstiš	571
Zahrádka	164
Žákava	491
Zbůch	2,999
Zdemyslice	654
Žilov	460
Zruč-Senec	3,486
Total	328,424
