= Černovice =

Černovice may refer to places in the Czech Republic:

- Černovice (Blansko District), a municipality and village in the South Moravian Region
- Černovice (Chomutov District), a municipality and village in the Ústí nad Labem Region
- Černovice (Pelhřimov District), a town in the Vysočina Region
- Černovice (Plzeň-South District), a municipality and village in the Plzeň Region
- Brno-Černovice, a borough of Brno

== See also ==
- Čerňovice
- Chernivtsi, a city in Ukraine called Černovice in Czech
