= Střížovice =

Střížovice may refer to places in the Czech Republic:

- Střížovice (Jindřichův Hradec District), a municipality and village in the South Bohemian Region
- Střížovice (Kroměříž District), a municipality and village in the Zlín Region
- Střížovice (Plzeň-South District), a municipality and village in the Plzeň Region
- Střížovice, a village and part of Chlumec (Ústí nad Labem District) in the Ústí nad Labem Region
- Střížovice, a village and part of Kropáčova Vrutice in the Central Bohemian Region
- Střížovice, a village and part of Myštice in the South Bohemian Region
- Střížovice, a village and part of Pěnčín (Liberec District) in the Liberec Region
- Střížovice, a village and part of Snědovice in the Ústí nad Labem Region
