= Blažim =

Blažim may refer to places in the Czech Republic:

- Blažim (Louny District), a municipality and village in the Ústí nad Labem Region
- Blažim (Plzeň-North District), a municipality and village in the Plzeň Region
- Blažim, a village and part of Neveklov in the Central Bohemian Region
