= Kakejcov =

- Municipality
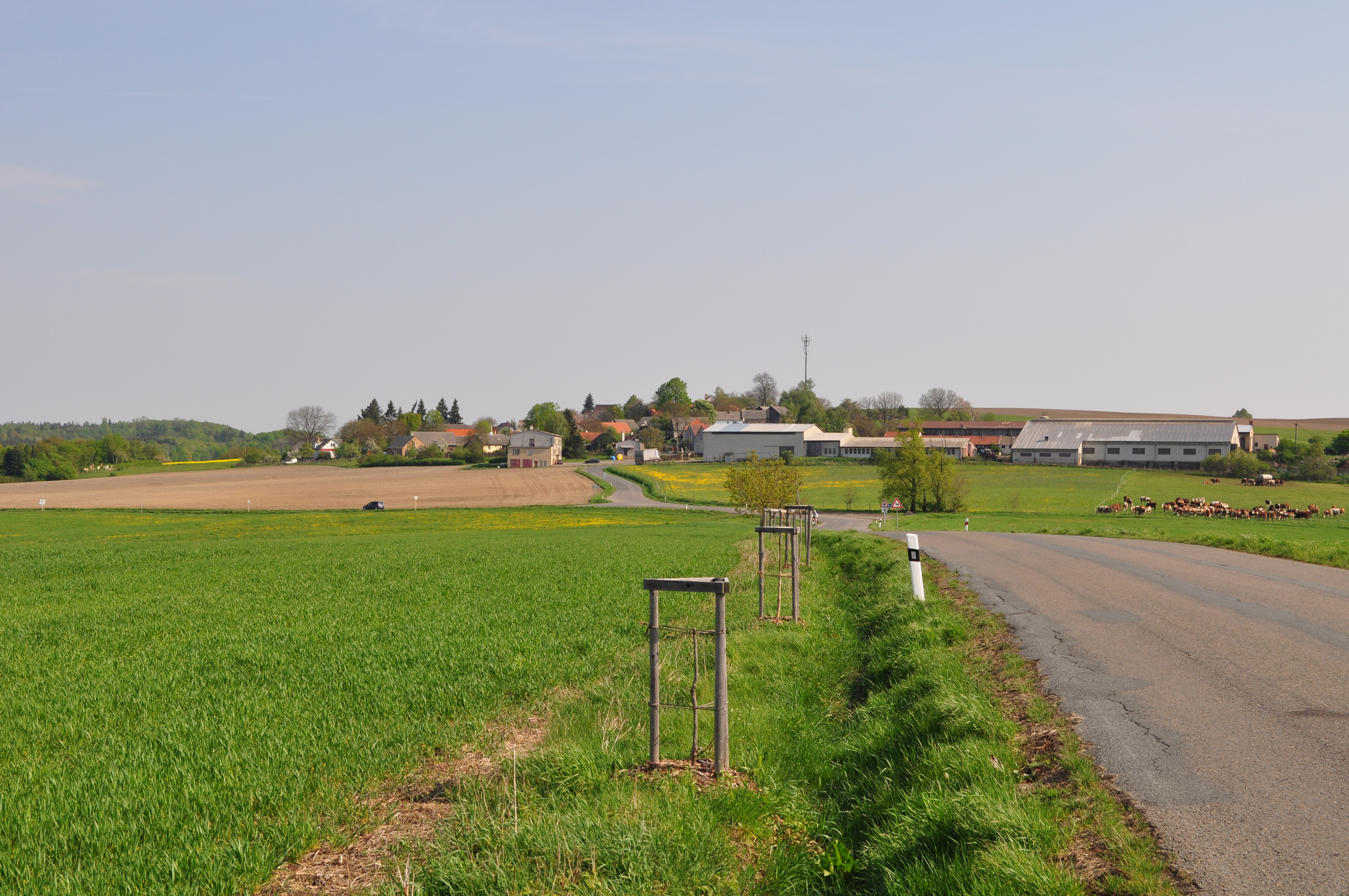
- General view

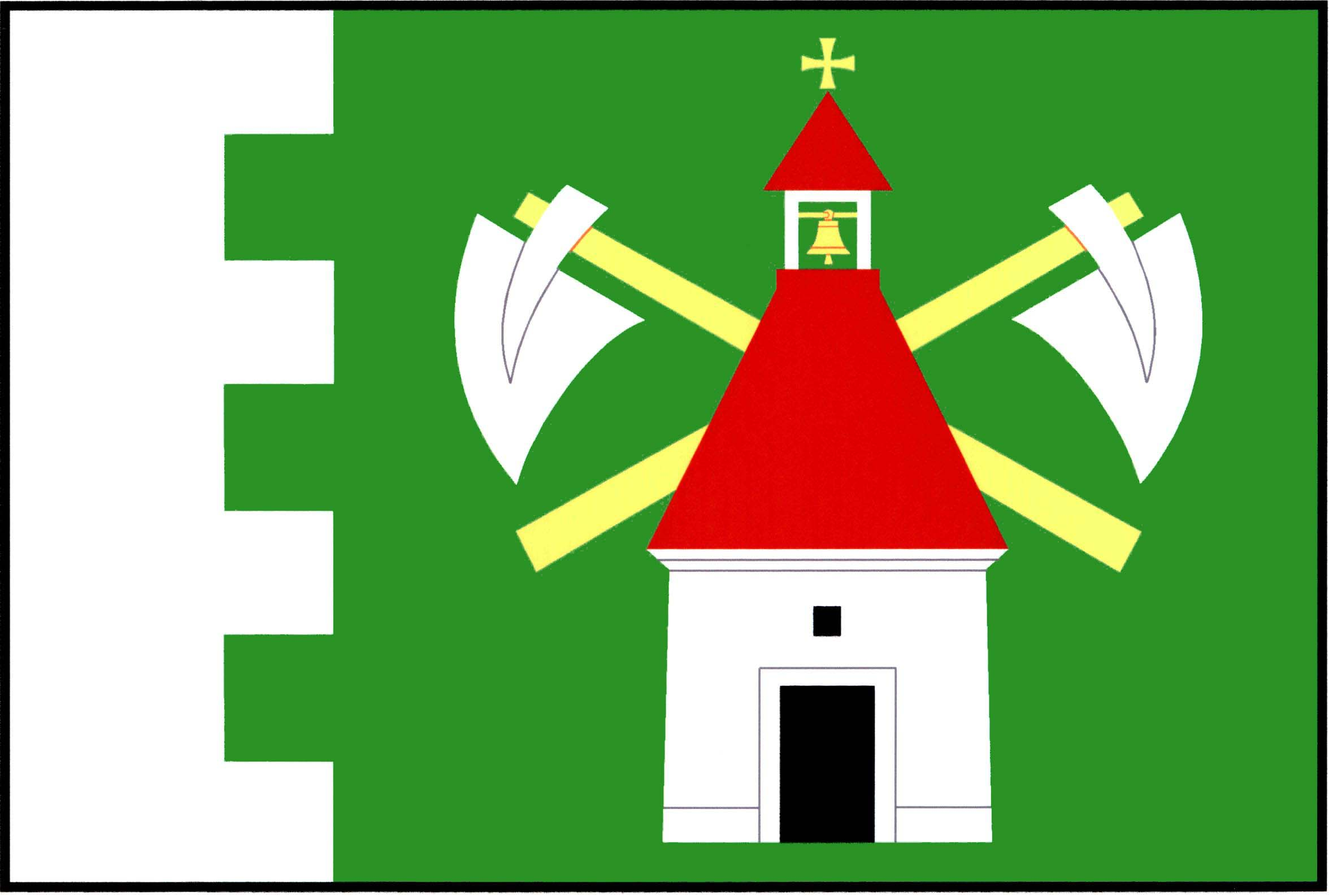
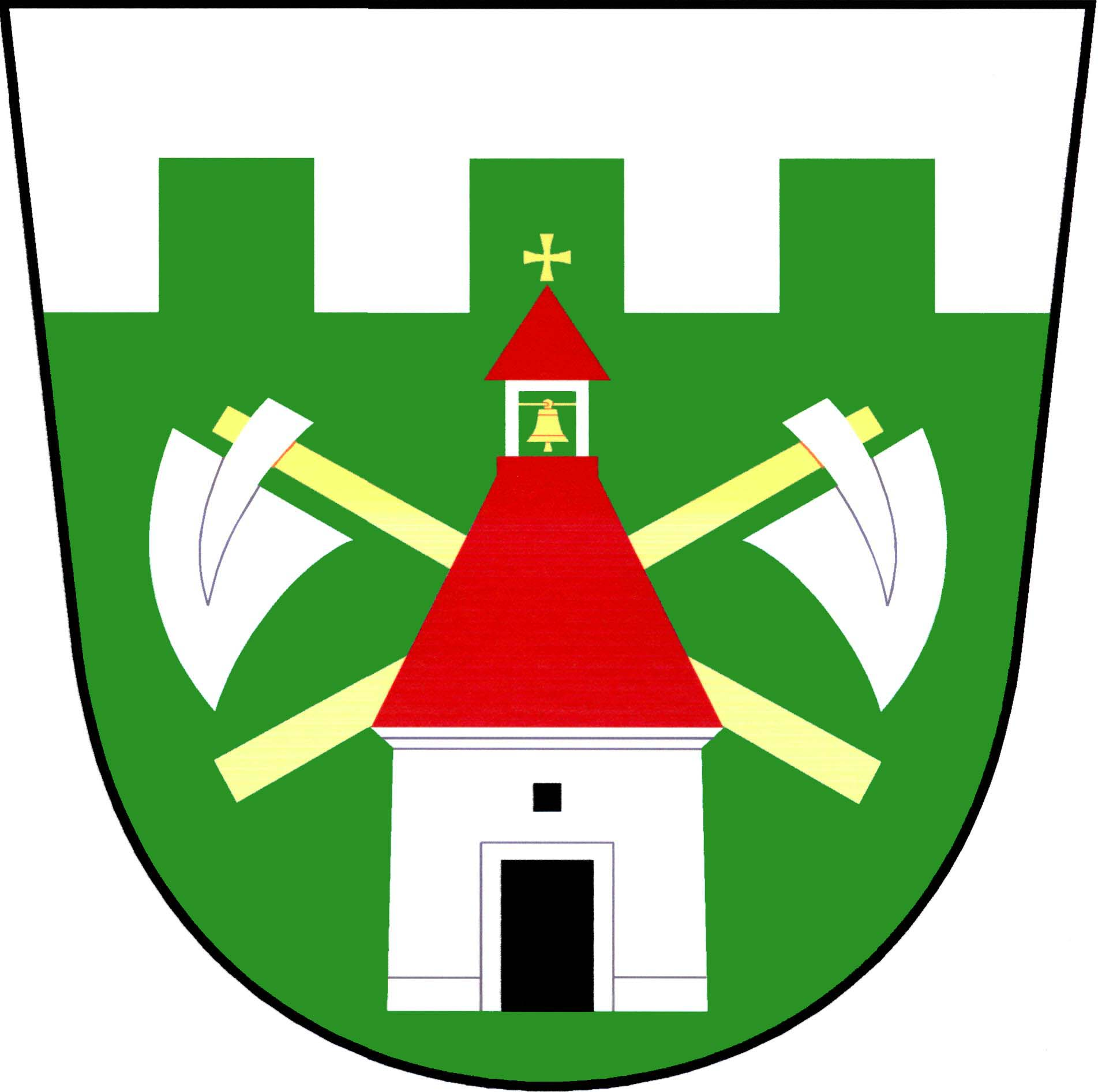
- Flag Coat of arms

- Location in the Czech Republic
- Coordinates: 49°40′1″N 13°37′27″E
- Country: Czech Republic
- Region: Plzeň
- District: Rokycany
- First mentioned: 1616

Area
  - Total: 1.87 km^{2} (0.72 sq mi)
- Elevation: 518 m (1,699 ft)

Population (2026-01-01)
  - Total: 106
  - Density: 56.7/km^{2} (147/sq mi)
- Time zone: UTC+1 (CET)
  - Summer (DST): UTC+2 (CEST)
- Postal code: 338 43
- Website: kakejcov.rokycansko.cz

Kakejcov (Czech pronunciation: [ˈkakɛjtsof]) is a municipality and village in Rokycany District in the Plzeň Region of the Czech Republic. It has about 100 inhabitants.

Kakejcov lies approximately 10 kilometres (6 mi) south of Rokycany, 21 km (13 mi) south-east of Plzeň, and 74 km (46 mi) south-west of Prague.

== History ==
From 1960 to 1979, Kakejcov was part of Mešno. From 1980 to 1991, it was a municipal part of Mirošov. Since 1992, it has been an independent municipality.

== Demographics ==
Historical population
Year	Pop.	±%
1869	199	—
1880	258	+29.6%
1890	244	−5.4%
1900	243	−0.4%
1910	236	−2.9%
1921	240	+1.7%
1930	247	+2.9%
1950	176	−28.7%
1961	148	−15.9%
1970	133	−10.1%
1980	137	+3.0%
1991	102	−25.5%
2001	91	−10.8%
2011	85	−6.6%
2021	91	+7.1%
Source: Censuses
