= Seč (Plzeň-South District) =

- Municipality
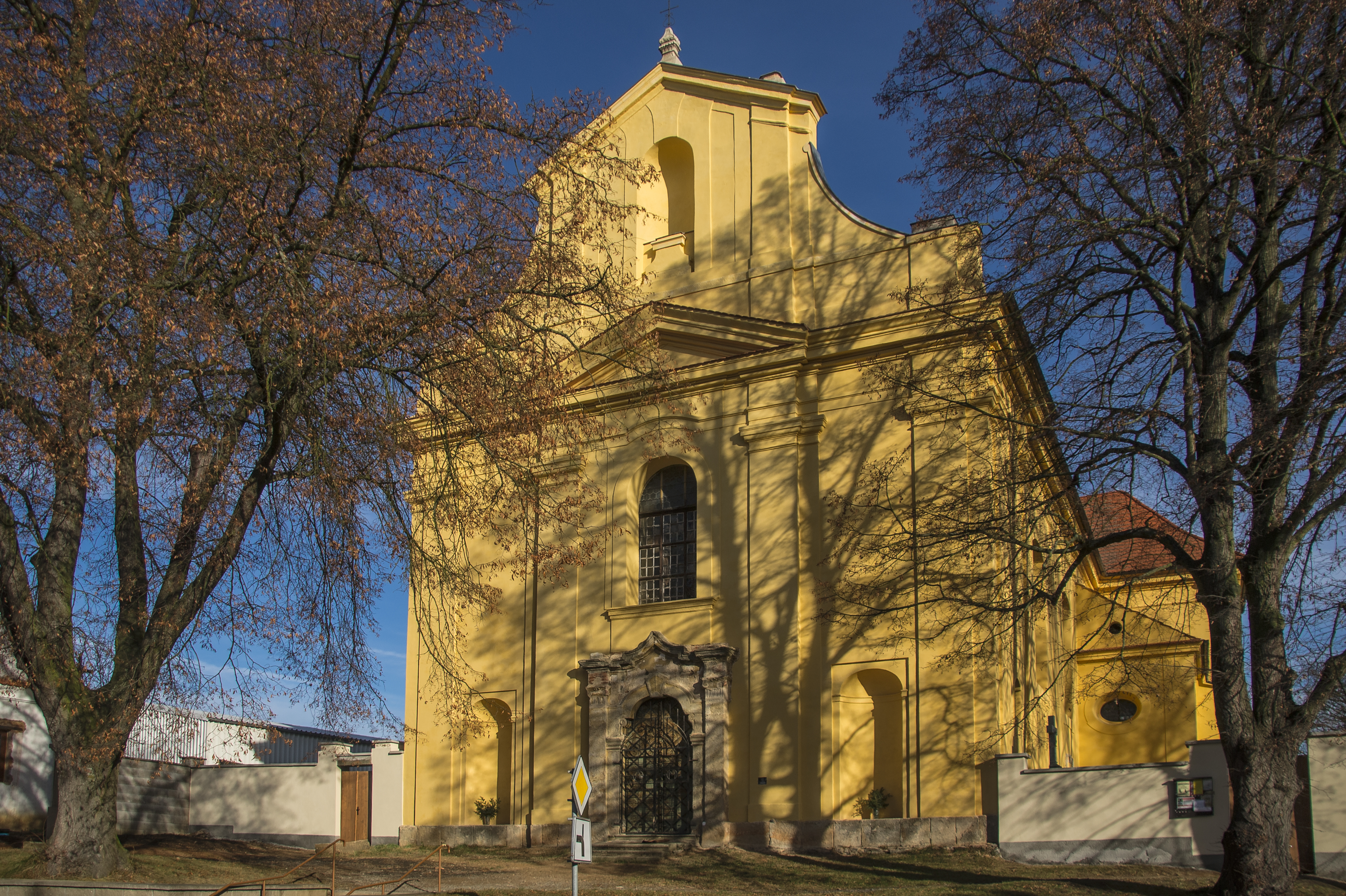
- Church of the Assumption of the Virgin Mary

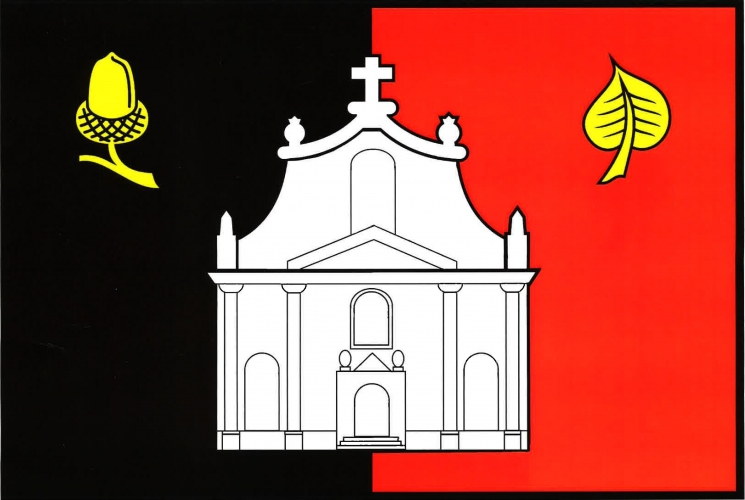
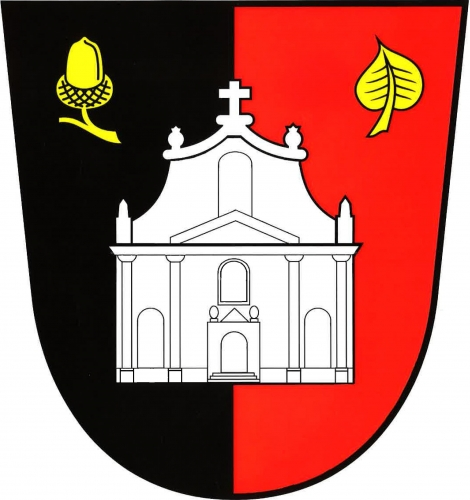
- Flag Coat of arms

- Location in the Czech Republic
- Coordinates: 49°35′17″N 13°30′18″E
- Country: Czech Republic
- Region: Plzeň
- District: Plzeň-South
- First mentioned: 1319

Area
  - Total: 3.34 km^{2} (1.29 sq mi)
- Elevation: 400 m (1,300 ft)

Population (2026-01-01)
  - Total: 323
  - Density: 96.7/km^{2} (250/sq mi)
- Time zone: UTC+1 (CET)
  - Summer (DST): UTC+2 (CEST)
- Postal code: 336 01
- Website: www.secublovic.cz

Seč is a municipality and village in Plzeň-South District in the Plzeň Region of the Czech Republic. It has about 300 inhabitants.

Seč lies approximately 20 kilometres (12 mi) south-east of Plzeň and 87 km (54 mi) south-west of Prague.

== Demographics ==
Historical population
| Year | Pop. | ±% |
|---|---|---|
| 1869 | 336 | — |
| 1880 | 333 | −0.9% |
| 1890 | 289 | −13.2% |
| 1900 | 306 | +5.9% |
| 1910 | 307 | +0.3% |
| 1921 | 322 | +4.9% |
| 1930 | 320 | −0.6% |
| 1950 | 234 | −26.9% |
| 1961 | 292 | +24.8% |
| 1970 | 278 | −4.8% |
| 1980 | 268 | −3.6% |
| 1991 | 267 | −0.4% |
| 2001 | 284 | +6.4% |
| 2011 | 269 | −5.3% |
| 2021 | 289 | +7.4% |
Source: Censuses
