= Vstiš =

- Municipality
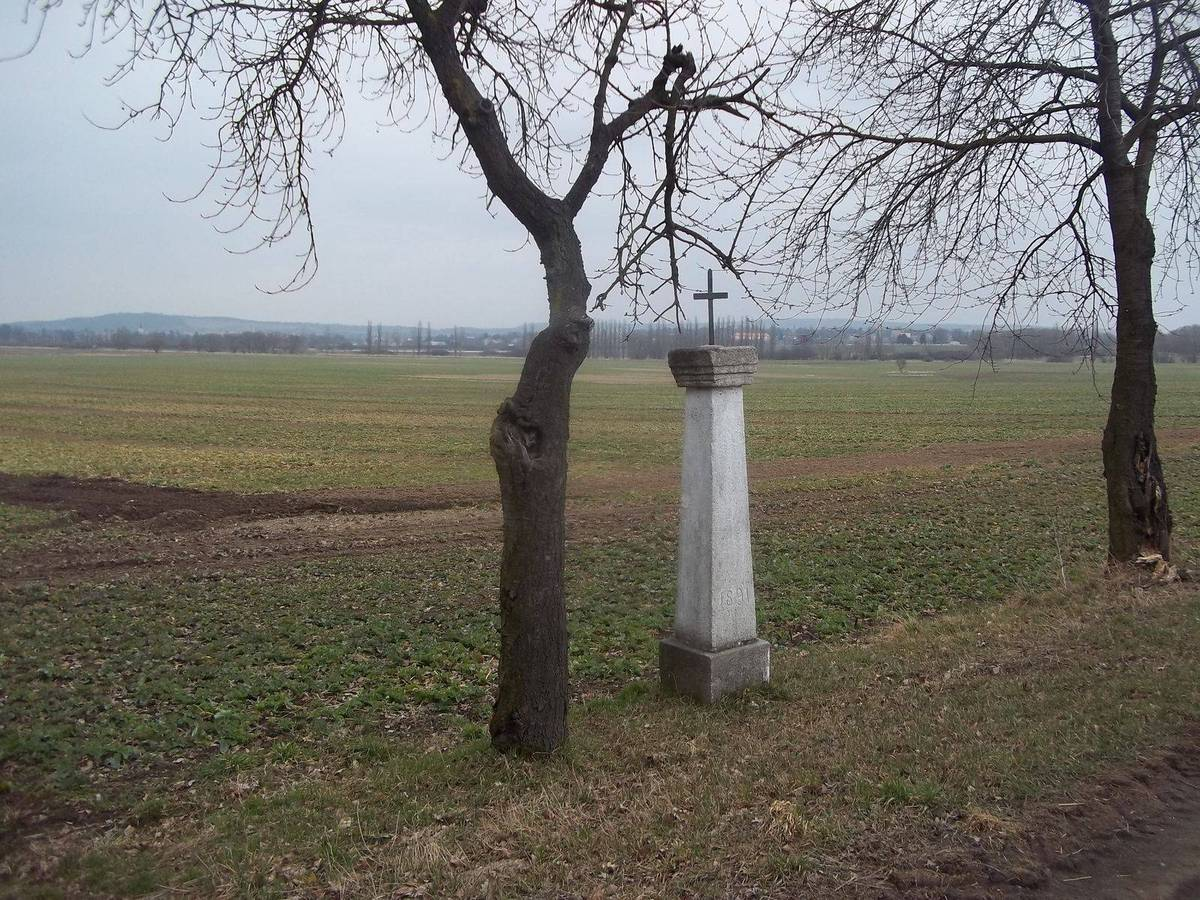
- A cross and fields in Vstiš

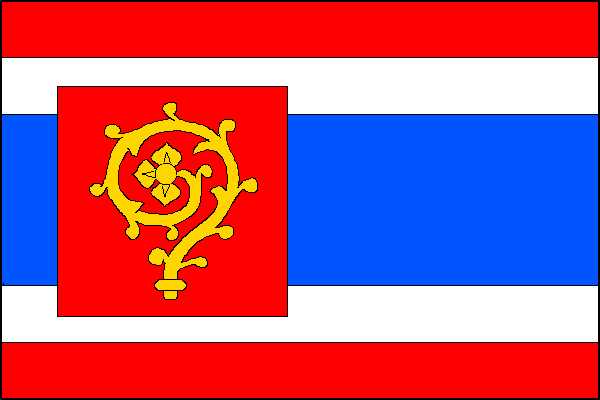
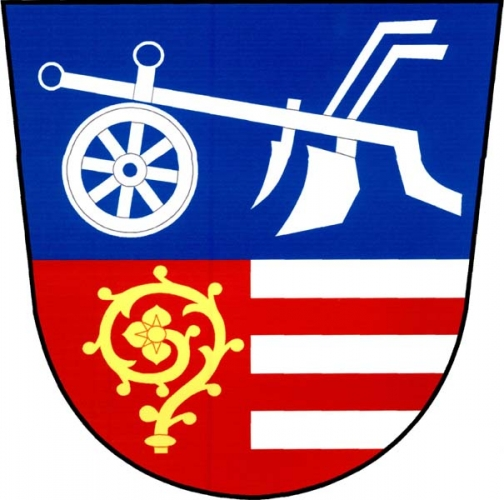
- Flag Coat of arms

- Location in the Czech Republic
- Coordinates: 49°38′41″N 13°14′54″E
- Country: Czech Republic
- Region: Plzeň
- District: Plzeň-South
- First mentioned: 1243

Area
  - Total: 7.72 km^{2} (2.98 sq mi)
- Elevation: 336 m (1,102 ft)

Population (2026-01-01)
  - Total: 575
  - Density: 74.5/km^{2} (193/sq mi)
- Time zone: UTC+1 (CET)
  - Summer (DST): UTC+2 (CEST)
- Postal code: 334 41
- Website: www.vstis.cz

Vstiš is a municipality and village in Plzeň-South District in the Plzeň Region of the Czech Republic. It has about 600 inhabitants.

Vstiš lies approximately 15 kilometres (9 mi) south-west of Plzeň and 98 km (61 mi) south-west of Prague.

== Demographics ==
Historical population
Year	Pop.	±%
1869	381	—
1880	419	+10.0%
1890	478	+14.1%
1900	772	+61.5%
1910	788	+2.1%
1921	862	+9.4%
1930	862	+0.0%
1950	618	−28.3%
1961	551	−10.8%
1970	484	−12.2%
1980	464	−4.1%
1991	378	−18.5%
2001	371	−1.9%
2011	439	+18.3%
2021	579	+31.9%
Source: Censuses
