= Blažim (Louny District) =

- Municipality
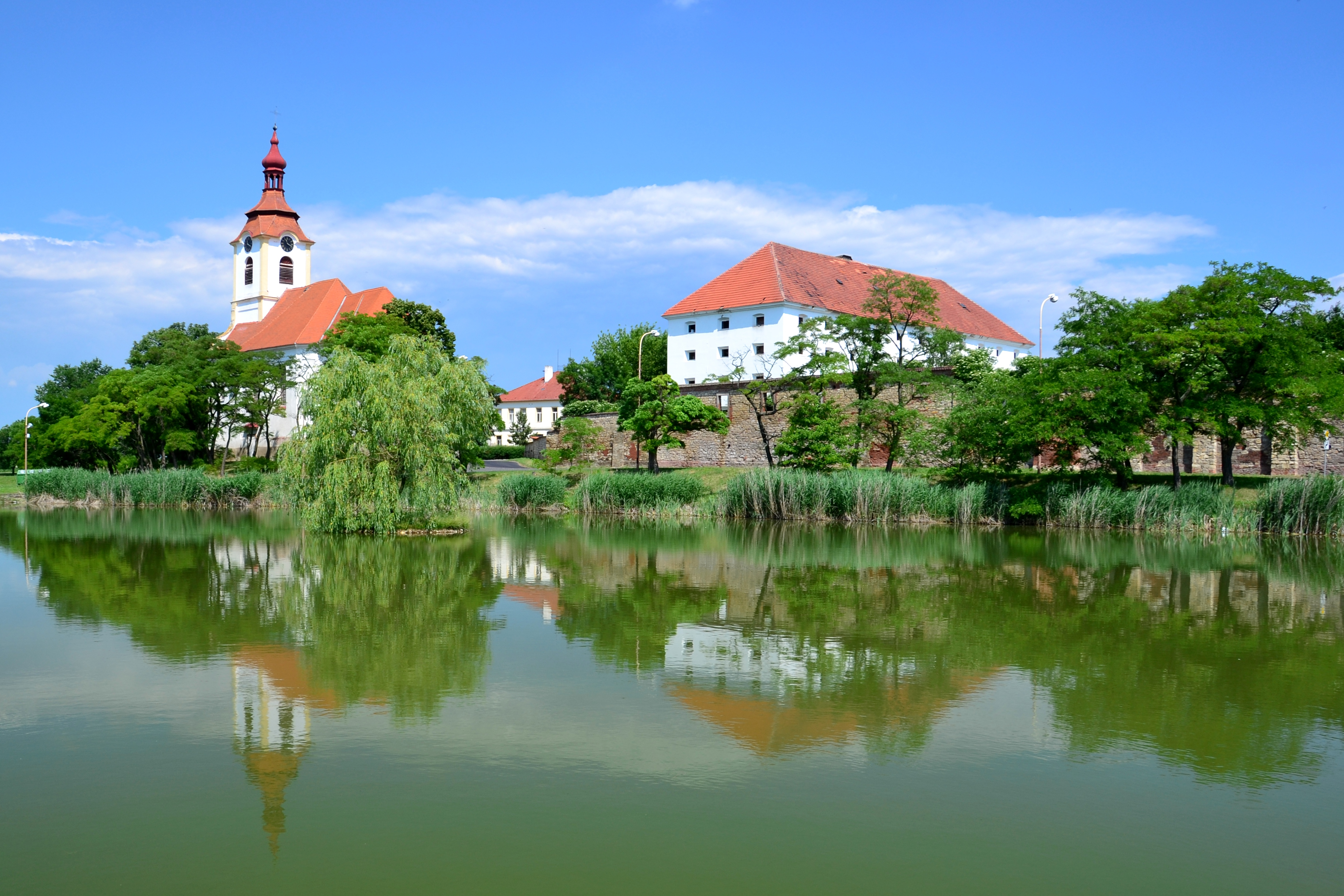
- View towards the Church of Saint Procopius

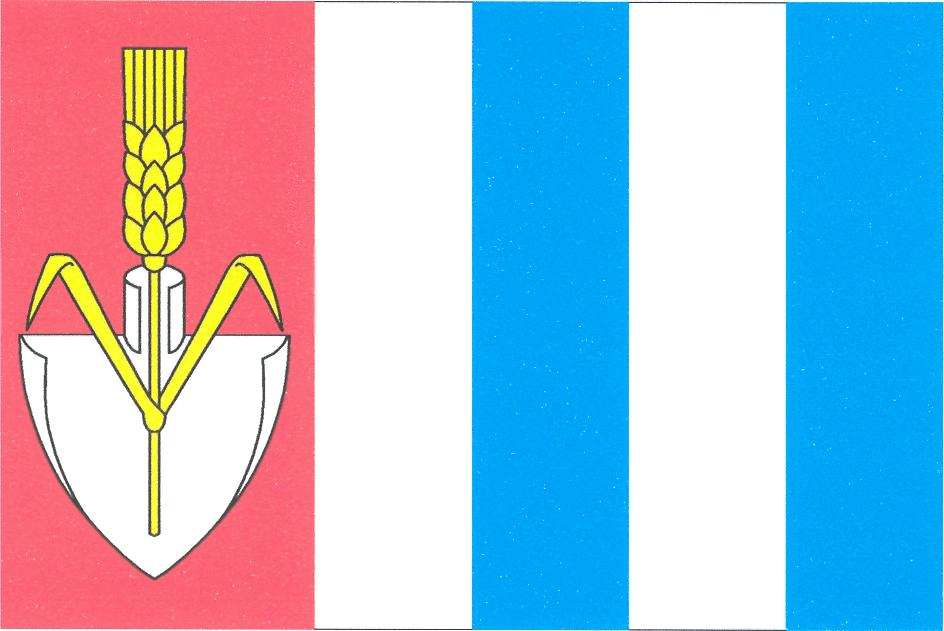
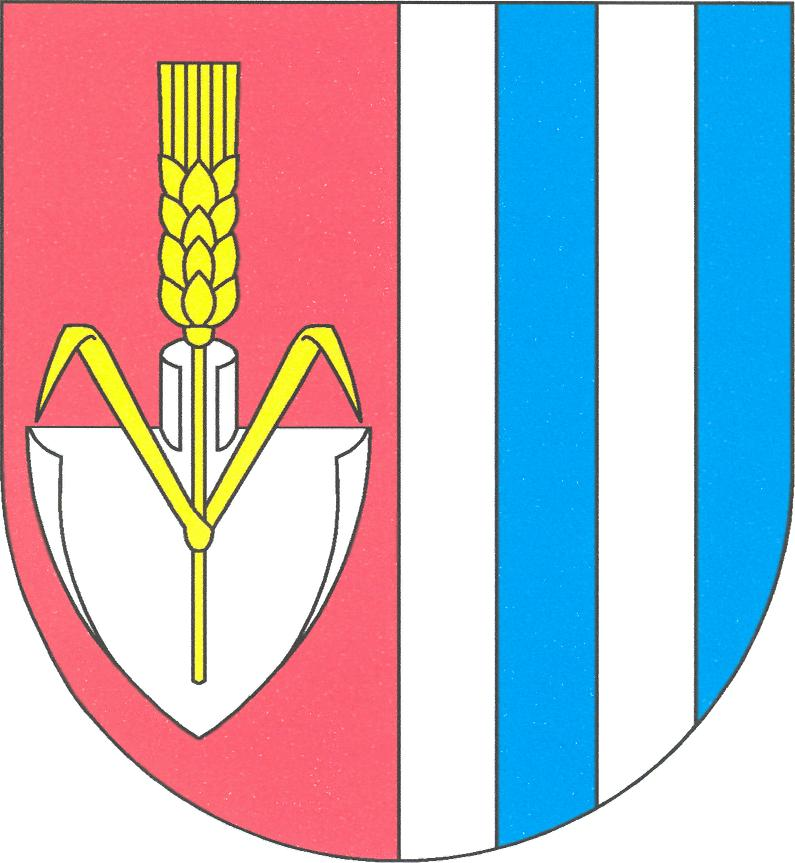
- Flag Coat of arms

- Location in the Czech Republic
- Coordinates: 50°24′25″N 13°37′43″E
- Country: Czech Republic
- Region: Ústí nad Labem
- District: Louny
- First mentioned: 1332

Area
  - Total: 9.61 km^{2} (3.71 sq mi)
- Elevation: 261 m (856 ft)

Population (2026-01-01)
  - Total: 290
  - Density: 30/km^{2} (78/sq mi)
- Time zone: UTC+1 (CET)
  - Summer (DST): UTC+2 (CEST)
- Postal code: 440 01
- Website: www.blazim.cz

Blažim (German: Ploscha) is a municipality and village in Louny District in the Ústí nad Labem Region of the Czech Republic. It has about 300 inhabitants.

Blažim lies approximately 14 kilometres (9 mi) north-west of Louny, 41 km (25 mi) south-west of Ústí nad Labem, and 67 km (42 mi) north-west of Prague.

== Demographics ==
Historical population
Year	Pop.	±%
1869	414	—
1880	490	+18.4%
1890	531	+8.4%
1900	522	−1.7%
1910	478	−8.4%
1921	530	+10.9%
1930	554	+4.5%
1950	251	−54.7%
1961	267	+6.4%
1970	266	−0.4%
1980	290	+9.0%
1991	157	−45.9%
2001	191	+21.7%
2011	254	+33.0%
2021	279	+9.8%
Source: Censuses
