= Chotíkov =

- Municipality
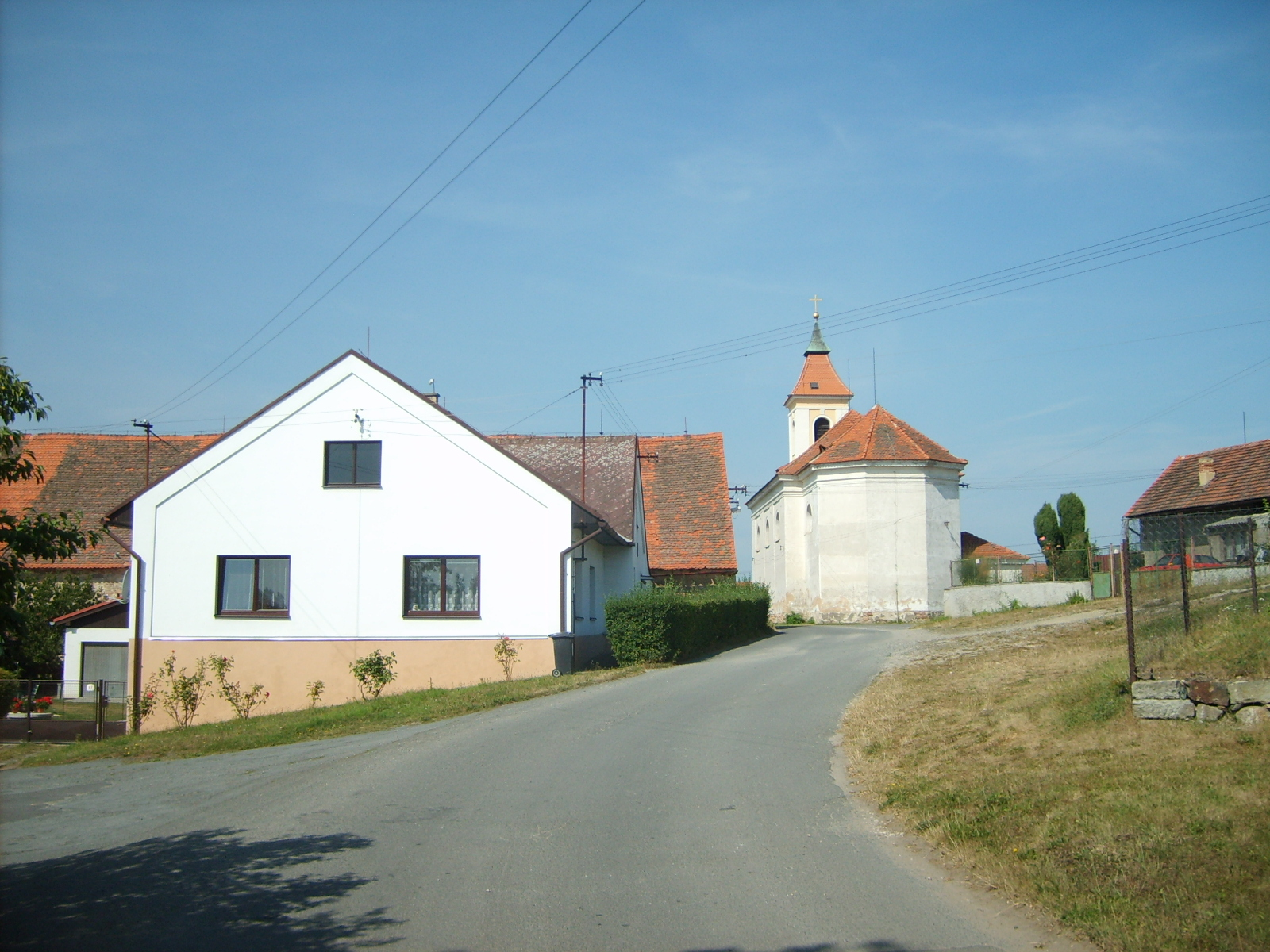
- Church in Chotíkov

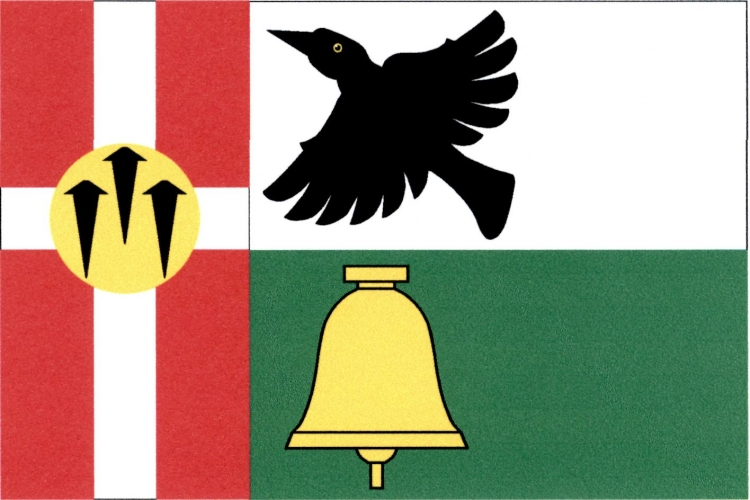
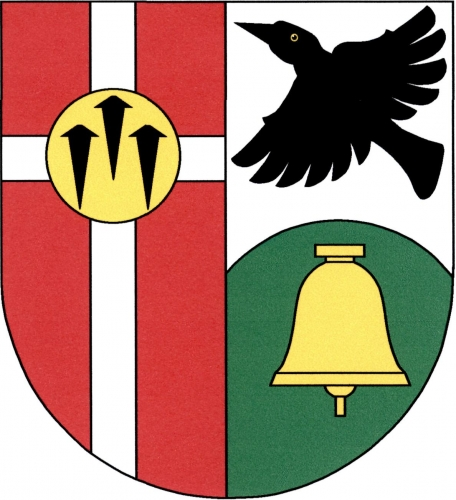
- Flag Coat of arms

- Location in the Czech Republic
- Coordinates: 49°47′29″N 13°19′22″E
- Country: Czech Republic
- Region: Plzeň
- District: Plzeň-North
- First mentioned: 1344

Area
  - Total: 11.26 km^{2} (4.35 sq mi)
- Elevation: 398 m (1,306 ft)

Population (2026-01-01)
  - Total: 1,307
  - Density: 116.1/km^{2} (300.6/sq mi)
- Time zone: UTC+1 (CET)
  - Summer (DST): UTC+2 (CEST)
- Postal code: 330 17
- Website: www.chotikov.cz

Chotíkov (German: Kodiken) is a municipality and village in Plzeň-North District in the Plzeň Region of the Czech Republic. It has about 1,300 inhabitants.

Chotíkov lies approximately 7 kilometres (4 mi) north-west of Plzeň and 86 km (53 mi) south-west of Prague.

== Demographics ==
Historical population
Year	Pop.	±%
1869	584	—
1880	613	+5.0%
1890	667	+8.8%
1900	753	+12.9%
1910	880	+16.9%
1921	978	+11.1%
1930	1,177	+20.3%
1950	943	−19.9%
1961	951	+0.8%
1970	776	−18.4%
1980	672	−13.4%
1991	678	+0.9%
2001	751	+10.8%
2011	1,078	+43.5%
2021	1,266	+17.4%
Source: Censuses

== Economy ==
A large-capacity municipal waste incinerator for nearby Plzeň has been built in the municipality.
