= Příšov =

- Municipality
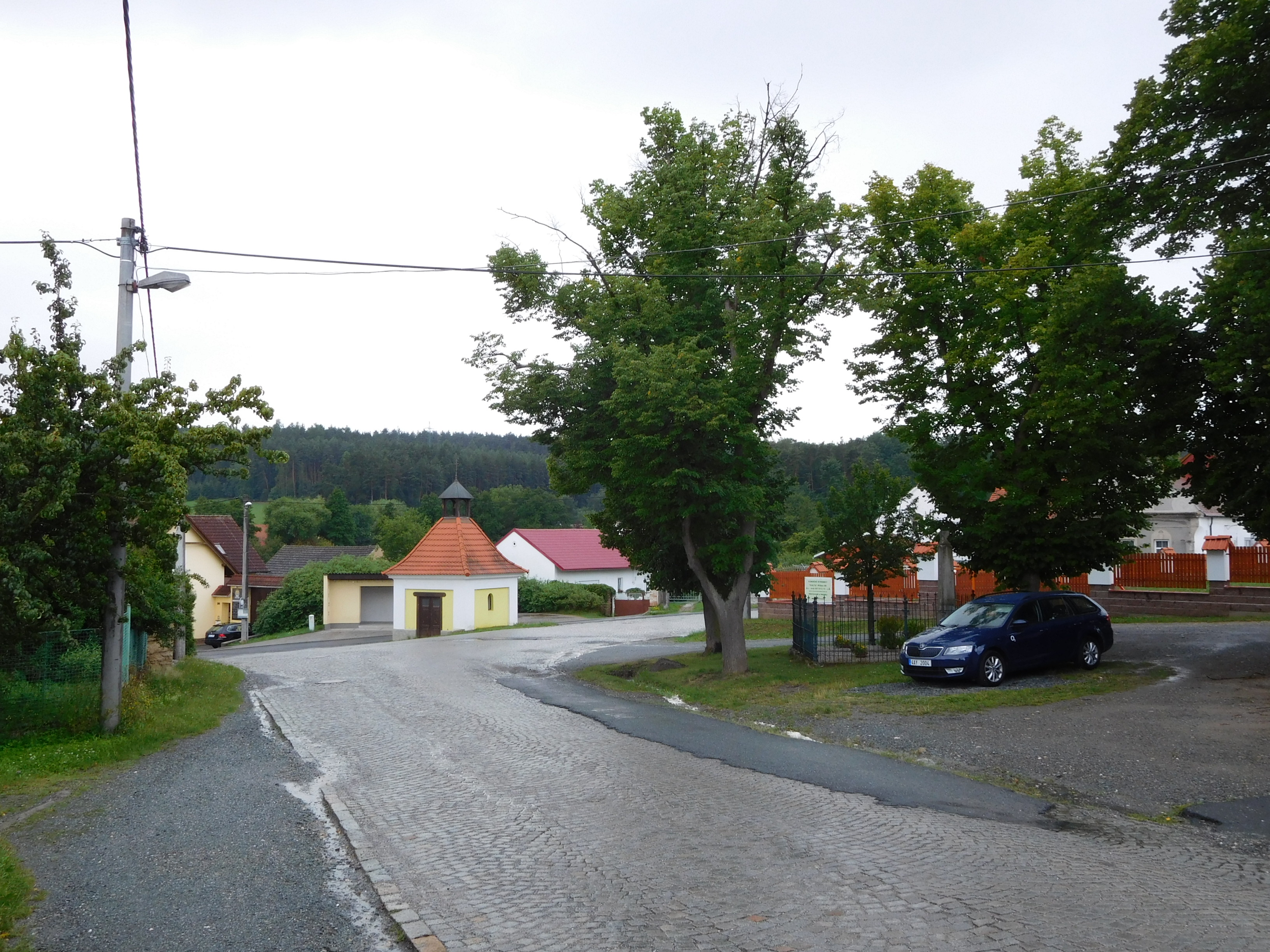
- Centre of Příšov

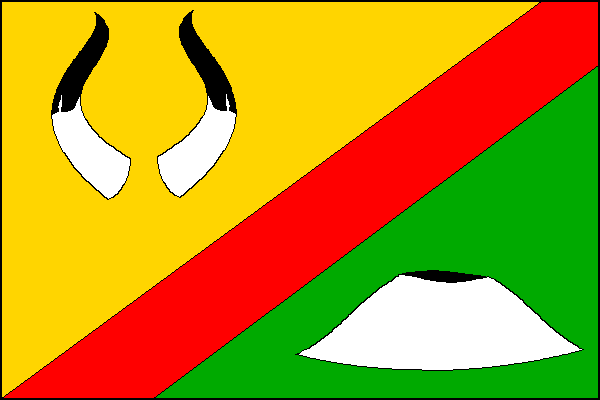
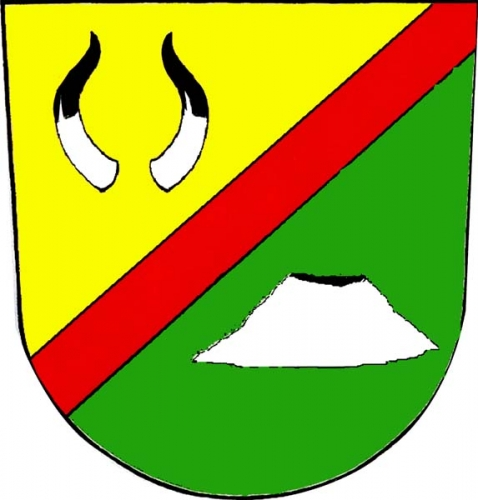
- Flag Coat of arms

- Location in the Czech Republic
- Coordinates: 49°48′42″N 13°18′15″E
- Country: Czech Republic
- Region: Plzeň
- District: Plzeň-North
- First mentioned: 1268

Area
  - Total: 2.93 km^{2} (1.13 sq mi)
- Elevation: 381 m (1,250 ft)

Population (2026-01-01)
  - Total: 336
  - Density: 115/km^{2} (297/sq mi)
- Time zone: UTC+1 (CET)
  - Summer (DST): UTC+2 (CEST)
- Postal code: 330 11
- Website: www.obec-prisov.cz

Příšov is a municipality and village in Plzeň-North District in the Plzeň Region of the Czech Republic. It has about 300 inhabitants.

Příšov lies approximately 10 kilometres (6 mi) north-west of Plzeň and 86 km (53 mi) west of Prague.

== Demographics ==
Historical population
Year	Pop.	±%
1869	216	—
1880	203	−6.0%
1890	239	+17.7%
1900	245	+2.5%
1910	283	+15.5%
1921	278	−1.8%
1930	317	+14.0%
1950	268	−15.5%
1961	286	+6.7%
1970	276	−3.5%
1980	252	−8.7%
1991	213	−15.5%
2001	231	+8.5%
2011	301	+30.3%
2021	332	+10.3%
Source: Censuses
