= Nadryby =

- Municipality
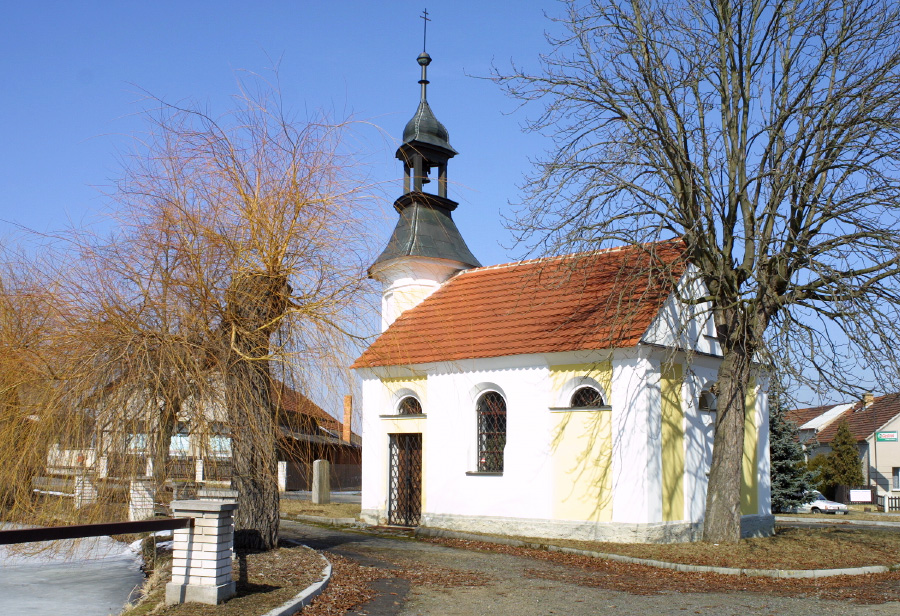
- Chapel of Saint Anthony of Padua

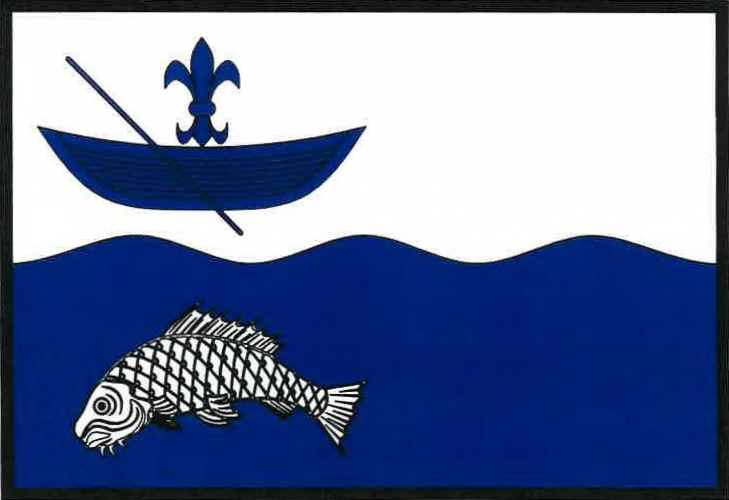
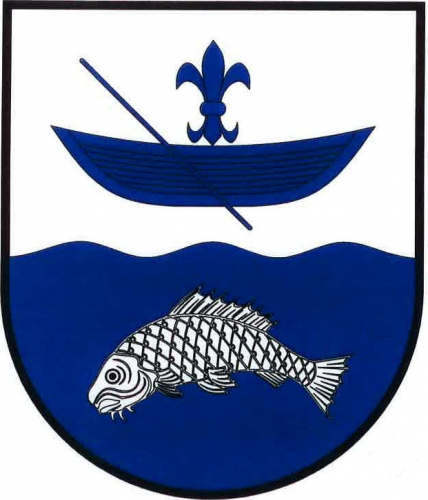
- Flag Coat of arms

- Location in the Czech Republic
- Coordinates: 49°49′15″N 13°31′28″E
- Country: Czech Republic
- Region: Plzeň
- District: Plzeň-North
- First mentioned: 1216

Area
  - Total: 4.49 km^{2} (1.73 sq mi)
- Elevation: 316 m (1,037 ft)

Population (2026-01-01)
  - Total: 130
  - Density: 29/km^{2} (75/sq mi)
- Time zone: UTC+1 (CET)
  - Summer (DST): UTC+2 (CEST)
- Postal code: 330 11
- Website: www.nadryby.cz

Nadryby is a municipality and village in Plzeň-North District in the Plzeň Region of the Czech Republic. It has about 100 inhabitants.

== Etymology ==
The name was either derived from the surname Nadryba, meaning "the village of Nadrybas (Nadryba's family)", or from the name of now non-existent village Rybí, meaning "above Rybí".

== Geography ==
Nadryby is located about 12 kilometres (7 mi) northeast of Plzeň. It lies in the Plasy Uplands. The highest point is at 389 m (1,276 ft) above sea level. The municipality is situated on the left bank of the Berounka River (between meanders of the river), which forms significant part of the municipal border.

== History ==
The first written mention of Nadryby is from 1216, when the village was sold to the monastery in Plasy. In 1575, Nadryby became part of the Křimice estate, but soon after, it was sold to the town of Rokycany. As a result of the Bohemian Revolt in 1618, the properties of Rokycany were confiscated by Emperor Ferdinand II and Nadryby was donated back to the Plasy Monastery in 1623.

== Demographics ==
Historical population

Year	Pop.	±%
1869	246	—
1880	270	+9.8%
1890	262	−3.0%
1900	263	+0.4%
1910	280	+6.5%

Year	Pop.	±%
1921	282	+0.7%
1930	295	+4.6%
1950	209	−29.2%
1961	212	+1.4%
1970	174	−17.9%

Year	Pop.	±%
1980	131	−24.7%
1991	117	−10.7%
2001	94	−19.7%
2011	106	+12.8%
2021	135	+27.4%

Source: Censuses

== Transport ==
There are no railways or major roads passing through the municipality.

== Sights ==
There are no protected cultural monuments in the municipality.
