= Střížovice (Kroměříž District) =

- Municipality
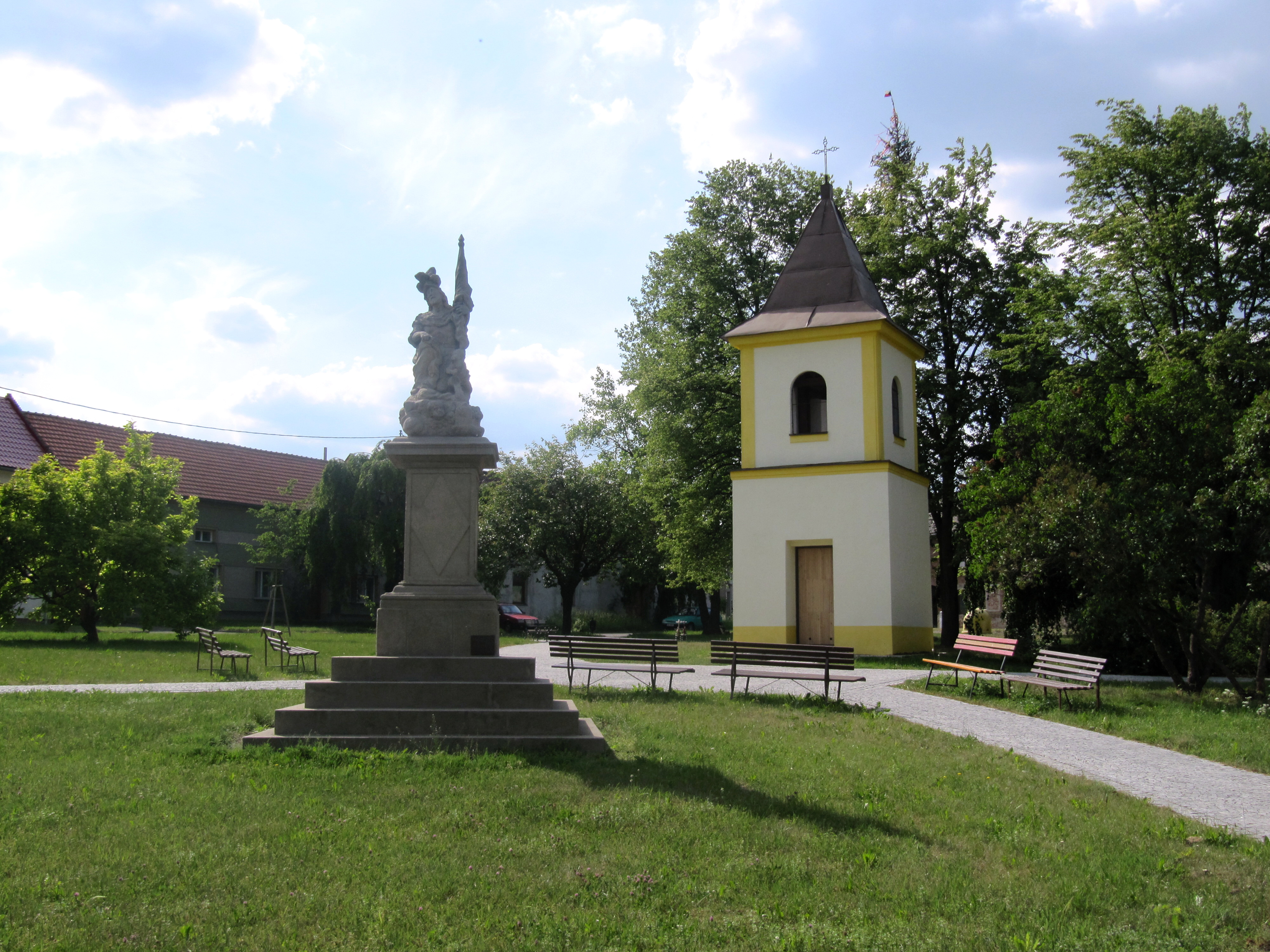
- Centre of Střížovice

- Flag Coat of arms

- Location in the Czech Republic
- Coordinates: 49°15′26″N 17°26′59″E
- Country: Czech Republic
- Region: Zlín
- District: Kroměříž
- First mentioned: 1365

Area
  - Total: 5.72 km^{2} (2.21 sq mi)
- Elevation: 190 m (620 ft)

Population (2026-01-01)
  - Total: 249
  - Density: 43.5/km^{2} (113/sq mi)
- Time zone: UTC+1 (CET)
  - Summer (DST): UTC+2 (CEST)
- Postal code: 768 21
- Website: www.strizovice-km.cz

Střížovice is a municipality and village in Kroměříž District in the Zlín Region of the Czech Republic. It has about 200 inhabitants.

== Geography ==
Střížovice is located about 5 kilometres (3 mi) southeast of Kroměříž and 14 km (9 mi) northwest of Zlín. It lies in a mainly agricultural landscape on the border between the Chřiby range and Upper Morava Valley. The Morava River forms the eastern municipal border.

There is a wetland called Bašnov, protected as a nature monument due to the presence of the European fire-bellied toad. The nature monument has an area of 17.5 ha (43 acres).

== History ==
The first written mention of Střížovice is from 1365.

== Demographics ==
Historical population

Year	Pop.	±%
1869	231	—
1880	256	+10.8%
1890	221	−13.7%
1900	238	+7.7%
1910	287	+20.6%

Year	Pop.	±%
1921	286	−0.3%
1930	256	−10.5%
1950	275	+7.4%
1961	251	−8.7%
1970	244	−2.8%

Year	Pop.	±%
1980	211	−13.5%
1991	212	+0.5%
2001	228	+7.5%
2011	249	+9.2%
2021	233	−6.4%

Source: Censuses

== Transport ==
There are no railways or major roads passing through the municipality.

== Sights ==
There are no major sights in the municipality. Among the protected cultural monuments are a statue of Saint Florian from 1723 and a stone cross from 1748. Other landmarks are a belfry and a chapel, both from the 18th century.
