= Černovice (Blansko District) =

- Municipality
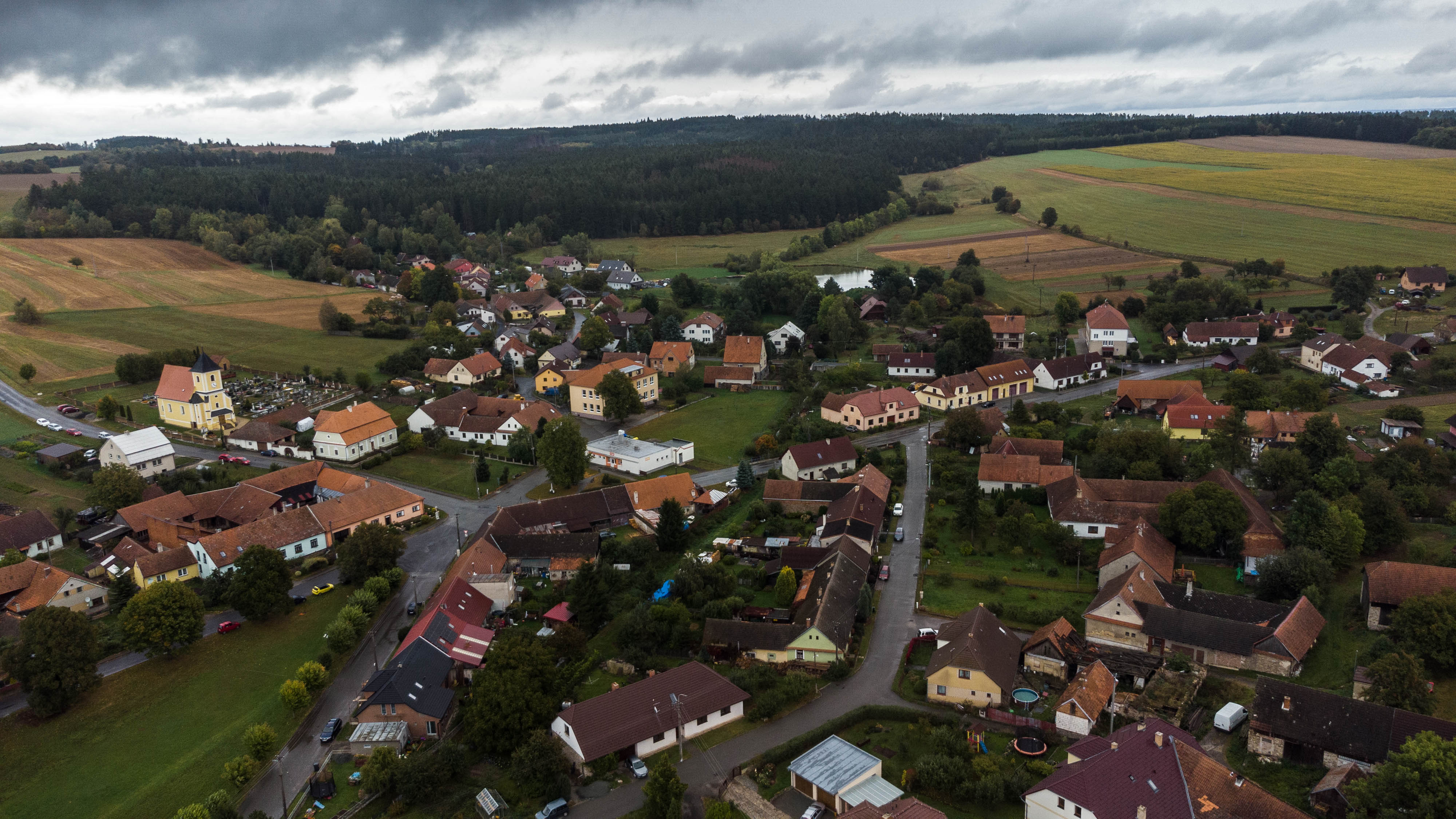
- Eastern part of Černovice

- Flag Coat of arms

- Location in the Czech Republic
- Coordinates: 49°29′0″N 16°25′23″E
- Country: Czech Republic
- Region: South Moravian
- District: Blansko
- First mentioned: 1286

Area
  - Total: 13.16 km^{2} (5.08 sq mi)
- Elevation: 620 m (2,030 ft)

Population (2026-01-01)
  - Total: 371
  - Density: 28.2/km^{2} (73.0/sq mi)
- Time zone: UTC+1 (CET)
  - Summer (DST): UTC+2 (CEST)
- Postal code: 679 75
- Website: www.obeccernovice.cz

Černovice is a municipality and village in Blansko District in the South Moravian Region of the Czech Republic. It has about 400 inhabitants.

== Demographics ==
Historical population
Year	Pop.	±%
1869	608	—
1880	634	+4.3%
1890	651	+2.7%
1900	638	−2.0%
1910	607	−4.9%
1921	603	−0.7%
1930	593	−1.7%
1950	455	−23.3%
1961	449	−1.3%
1970	403	−10.2%
1980	378	−6.2%
1991	359	−5.0%
2001	332	−7.5%
2011	353	+6.3%
2021	369	+4.5%
Source: Censuses
