= Úherce (Plzeň-North District) =

- Municipality
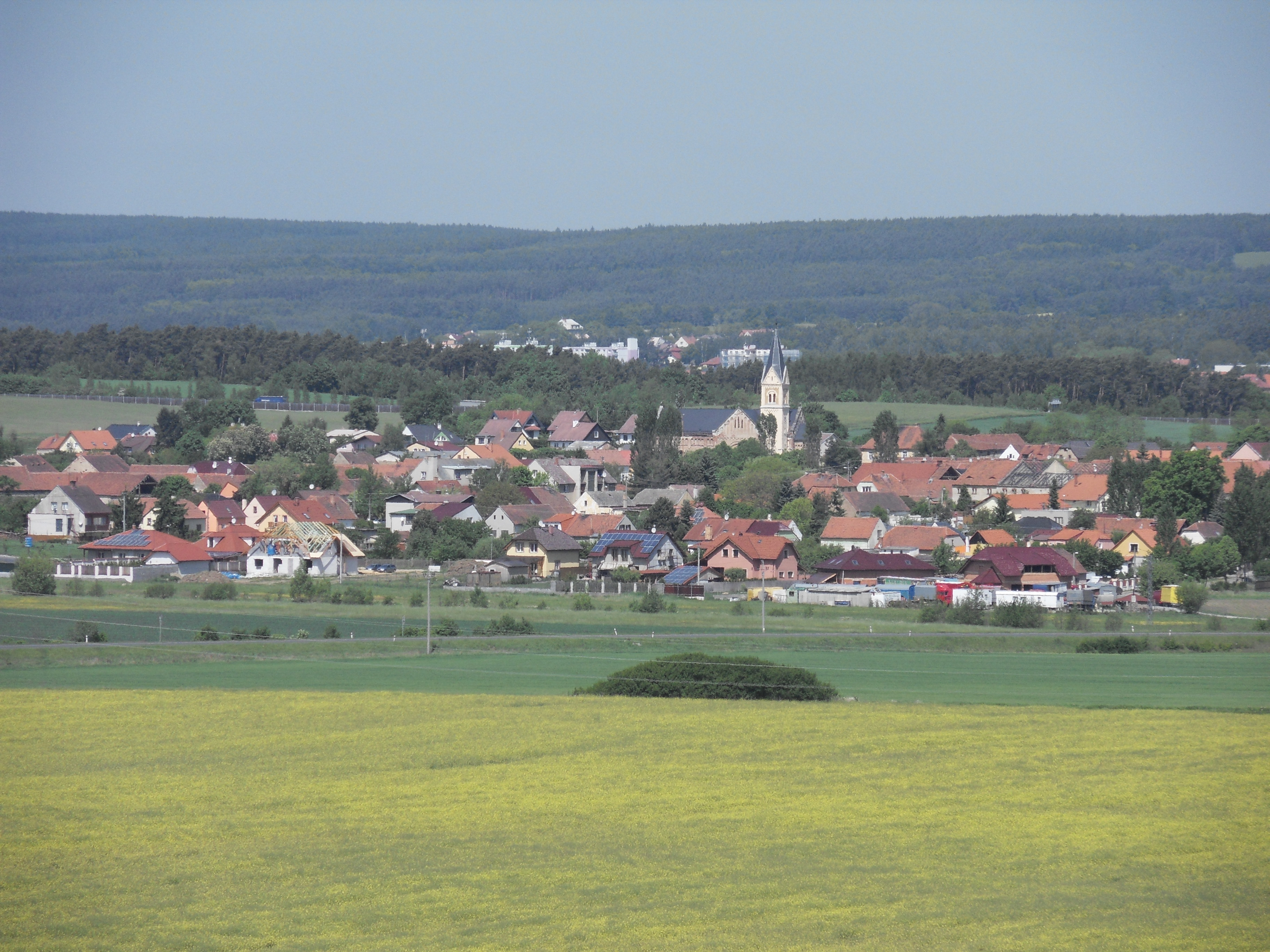
- General view

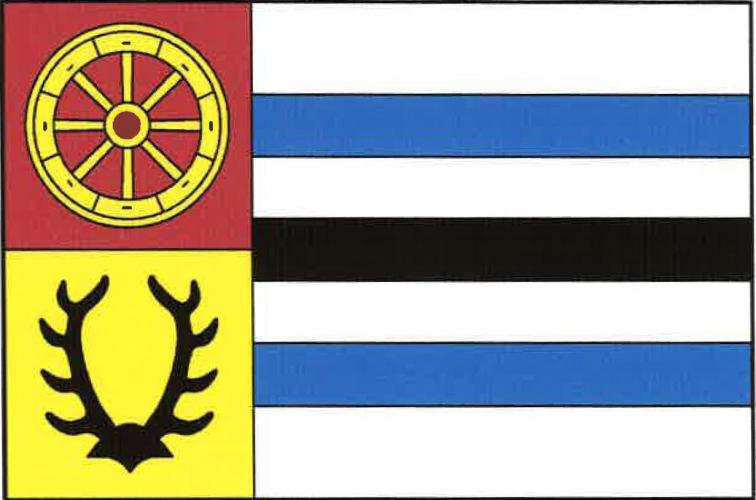
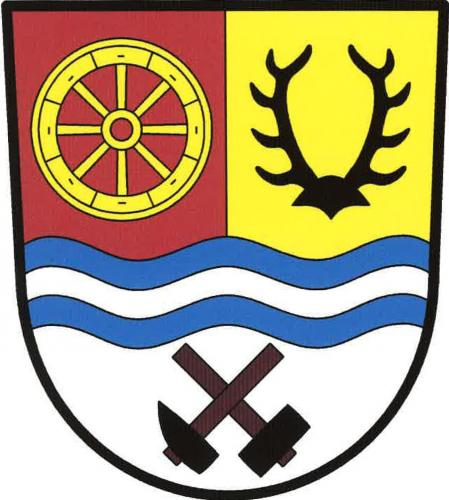
- Flag Coat of arms

- Location in the Czech Republic
- Coordinates: 49°42′5″N 13°12′50″E
- Country: Czech Republic
- Region: Plzeň
- District: Plzeň-North
- First mentioned: 1213

Area
  - Total: 7.99 km^{2} (3.08 sq mi)
- Elevation: 341 m (1,119 ft)

Population (2026-01-01)
  - Total: 425
  - Density: 53.2/km^{2} (138/sq mi)
- Time zone: UTC+1 (CET)
  - Summer (DST): UTC+2 (CEST)
- Postal code: 330 23
- Website: obecuherce.cz

Úherce (German: Auherzen) is a municipality and village in Plzeň-North District in the Plzeň Region of the Czech Republic. It has about 400 inhabitants.

Úherce lies approximately 13 kilometres (8 mi) south-west of Plzeň and 97 km (60 mi) south-west of Prague.

== Demographics ==
Historical population
Year	Pop.	±%
1869	392	—
1880	451	+15.1%
1890	451	+0.0%
1900	430	−4.7%
1910	537	+24.9%
1921	561	+4.5%
1930	592	+5.5%
1950	460	−22.3%
1961	449	−2.4%
1970	380	−15.4%
1980	319	−16.1%
1991	244	−23.5%
2001	241	−1.2%
2011	324	+34.4%
2021	421	+29.9%
Source: Censuses
