= Kunějovice =

- Municipality
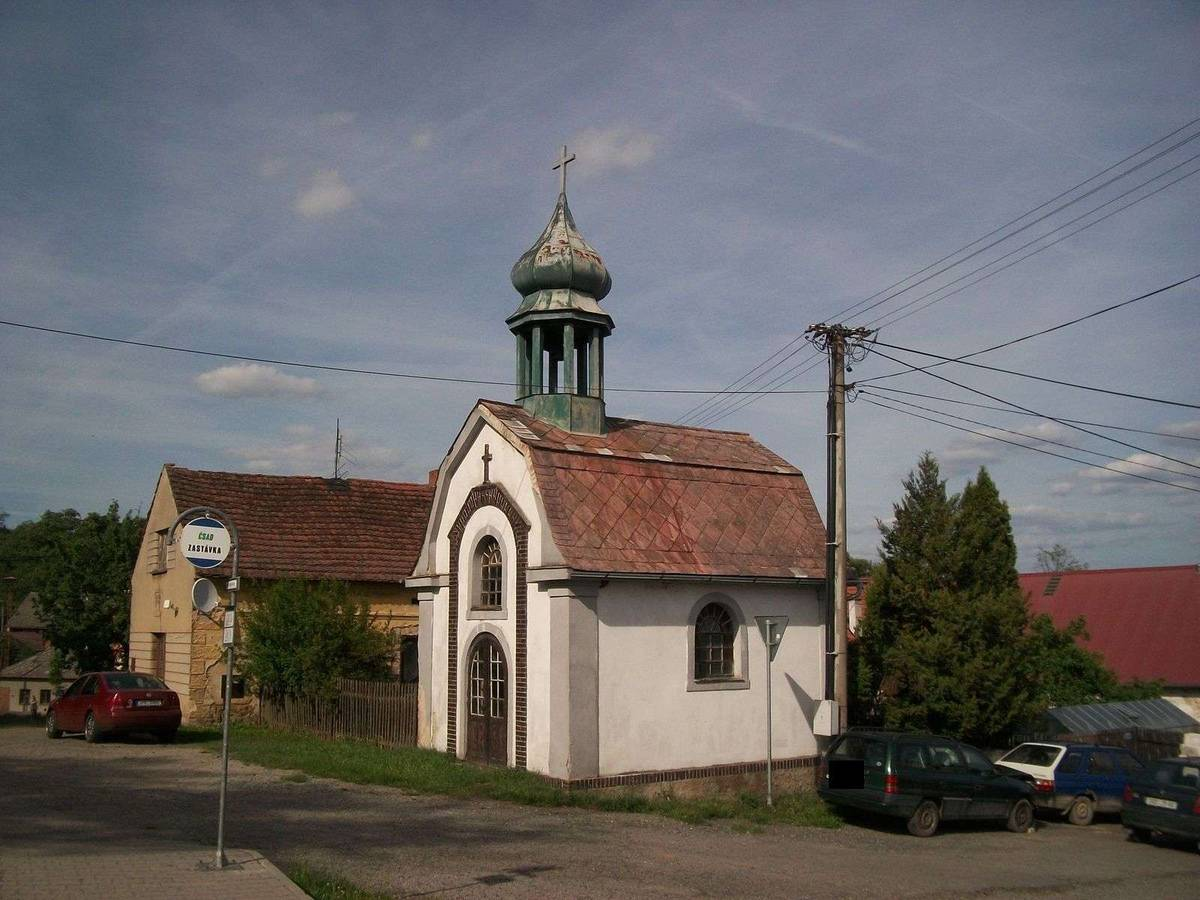
- Chapel of Saint Anne

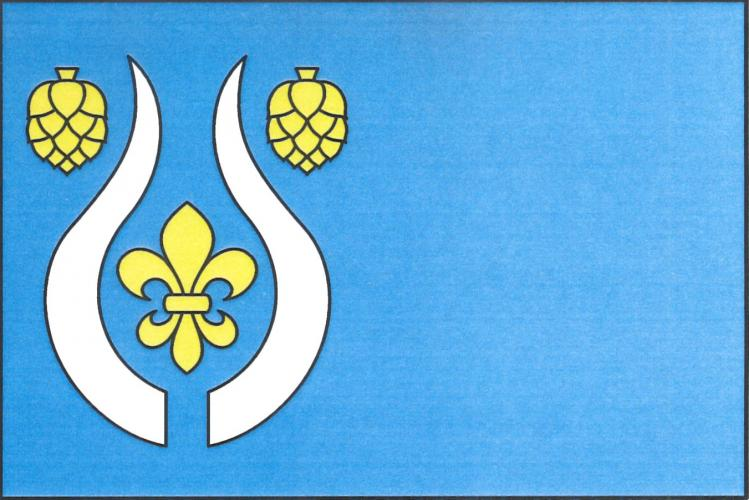
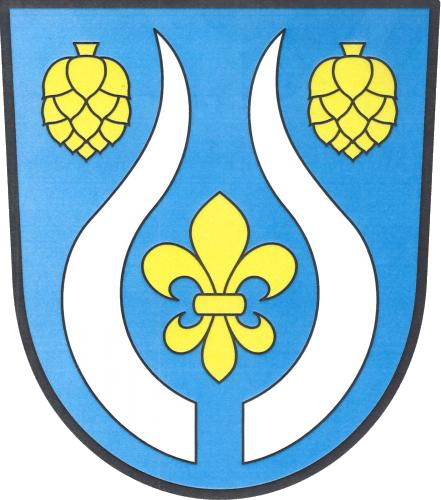
- Flag Coat of arms

- Location in the Czech Republic
- Coordinates: 49°51′43″N 13°14′13″E
- Country: Czech Republic
- Region: Plzeň
- District: Plzeň-North
- First mentioned: 1269

Area
  - Total: 4.41 km^{2} (1.70 sq mi)
- Elevation: 485 m (1,591 ft)

Population (2026-01-01)
  - Total: 168
  - Density: 38.1/km^{2} (98.7/sq mi)
- Time zone: UTC+1 (CET)
  - Summer (DST): UTC+2 (CEST)
- Postal code: 330 35
- Website: www.obeckunejovice.cz

Kunějovice (German: Kuniowitz) is a municipality and village in Plzeň-North District in the Plzeň Region of the Czech Republic. It has about 200 inhabitants.

Kunějovice lies approximately 16 kilometres (10 mi) north-west of Plzeň and 89 km (55 mi) west of Prague.

== Demographics ==
Historical population
Year	Pop.	±%
1869	260	—
1880	270	+3.8%
1890	235	−13.0%
1900	223	−5.1%
1910	236	+5.8%
1921	227	−3.8%
1930	251	+10.6%
1950	197	−21.5%
1961	212	+7.6%
1970	179	−15.6%
1980	129	−27.9%
1991	120	−7.0%
2001	127	+5.8%
2011	139	+9.4%
2021	180	+29.5%
Source: Censuses
