= Druztová =

- Municipality
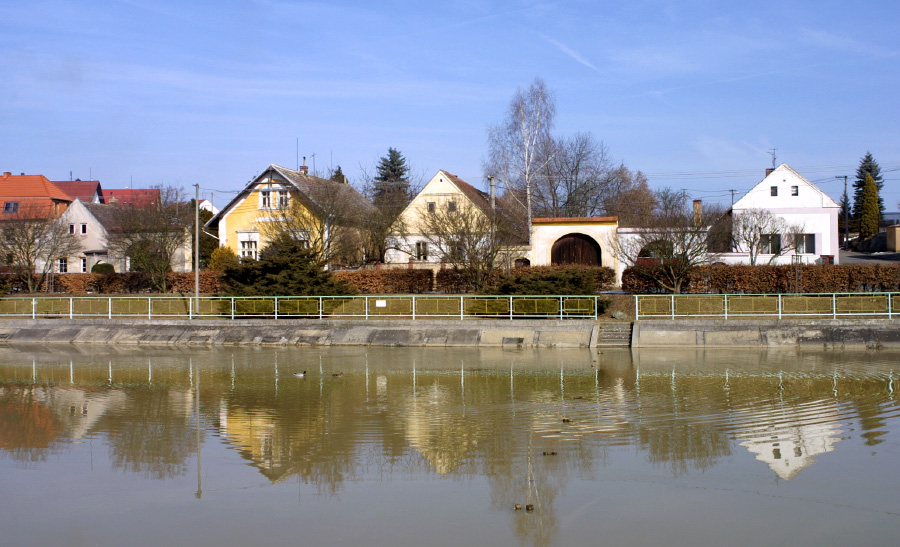
- Common in Druztová

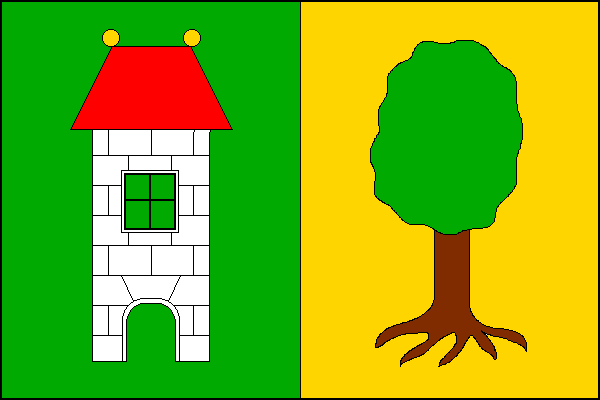
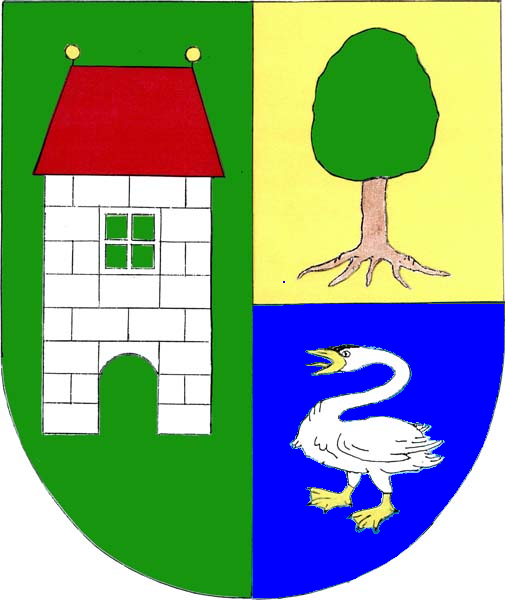
- Flag Coat of arms

- Location in the Czech Republic
- Coordinates: 49°47′51″N 13°26′56″E
- Country: Czech Republic
- Region: Plzeň
- District: Plzeň-North
- First mentioned: 1351

Area
  - Total: 5.02 km^{2} (1.94 sq mi)
- Elevation: 332 m (1,089 ft)

Population (2026-01-01)
  - Total: 786
  - Density: 157/km^{2} (406/sq mi)
- Time zone: UTC+1 (CET)
  - Summer (DST): UTC+2 (CEST)
- Postal code: 330 07
- Website: www.druztova.c-r.cz

Druztová is a municipality and village in Plzeň-North District in the Plzeň Region of the Czech Republic. It has about 800 inhabitants.

== Etymology ==
The original name of the municipality was Druzdová. The name is derived from the Old Czech word drstný (in modern Czech drsný), meaning 'rough'. In 1924, the name was changed to Druztová.

== Geography ==
Druztová is located about 7 kilometres (4 mi) northeast of Plzeň. It lies in the Plasy Uplands. The highest point is at 364 m (1,194 ft) above sea level. The municipality is situated on the left bank of the Berounka River, at its confluence with the stream Drahotínský potok. A system of five several fishponds in located on the eastern edge of the village, supplied by the Drahotínský potok and its nameless tributary.

== History ==
Around 1300, the Věžka Castle was built, and the village of Druztová was founded near the castle. The first written mention of Druztová is from 1351, when the church was founded.

== Demographics ==
Historical population

Year	Pop.	±%
1869	307	—
1880	403	+31.3%
1890	501	+24.3%
1900	574	+14.6%
1910	668	+16.4%

Year	Pop.	±%
1921	732	+9.6%
1930	794	+8.5%
1950	682	−14.1%
1961	702	+2.9%
1970	672	−4.3%

Year	Pop.	±%
1980	622	−7.4%
1991	590	−5.1%
2001	630	+6.8%
2011	678	+7.6%
2021	781	+15.2%

Source: Censuses

== Transport ==
There are no railways or major roads passing through the municipality.

== Sights ==
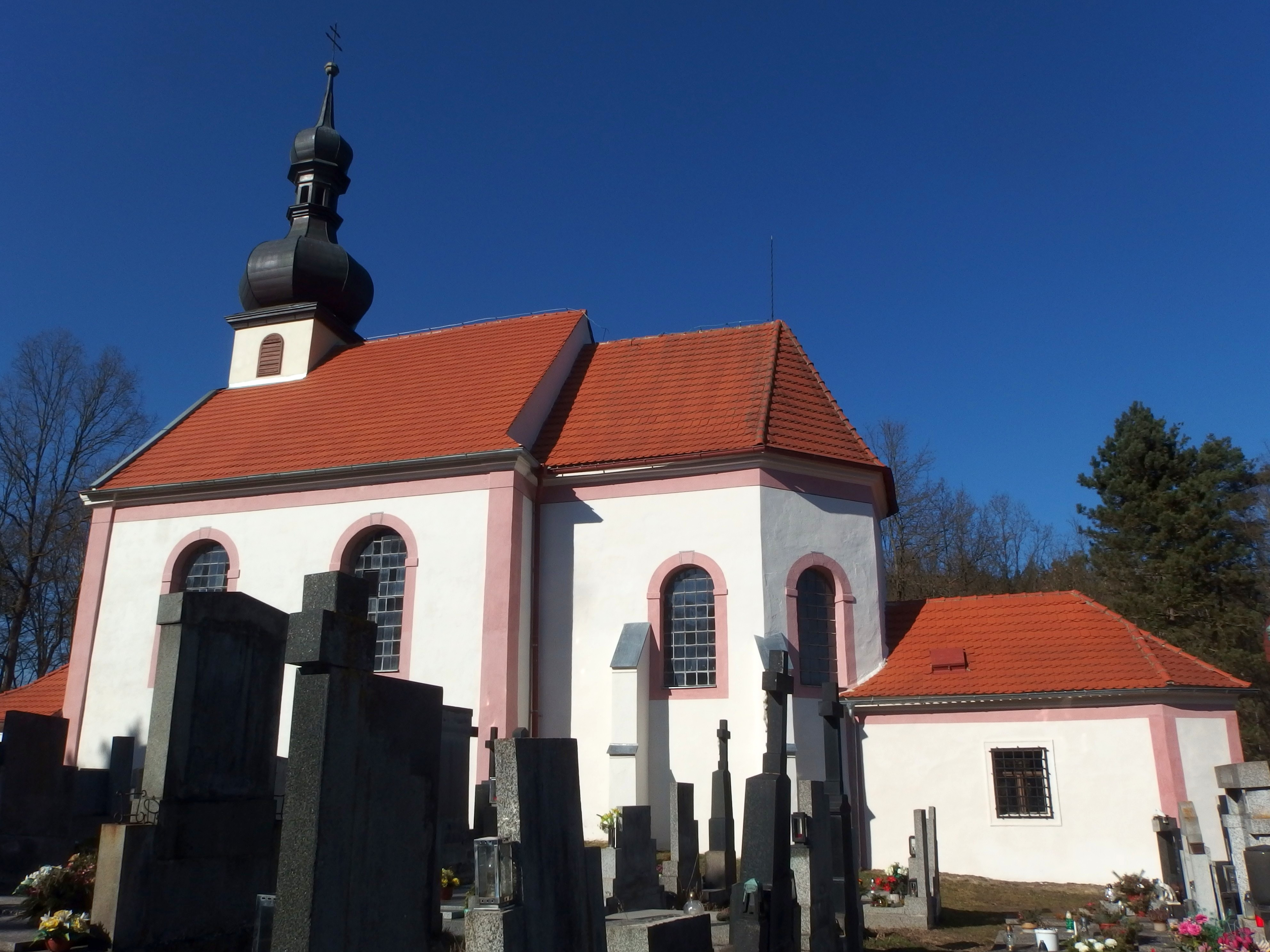
Church of Saint Mary Magdalene

The main landmark of Druztová is the Church of Saint Mary Magdalene. The Gothic core from the mid-14th century was rebuilt and extended in the Baroque style in 1699. Next to the church is a mortuary from the first half of the 18th century.

The ruin of the Věžka Castle is located on a hill near the village. The castle was conquered and destroyed in 1478 and has since been abandoned. Remains of masonry and landscaping have survived to this day.
