= Kbelany =

- Municipality
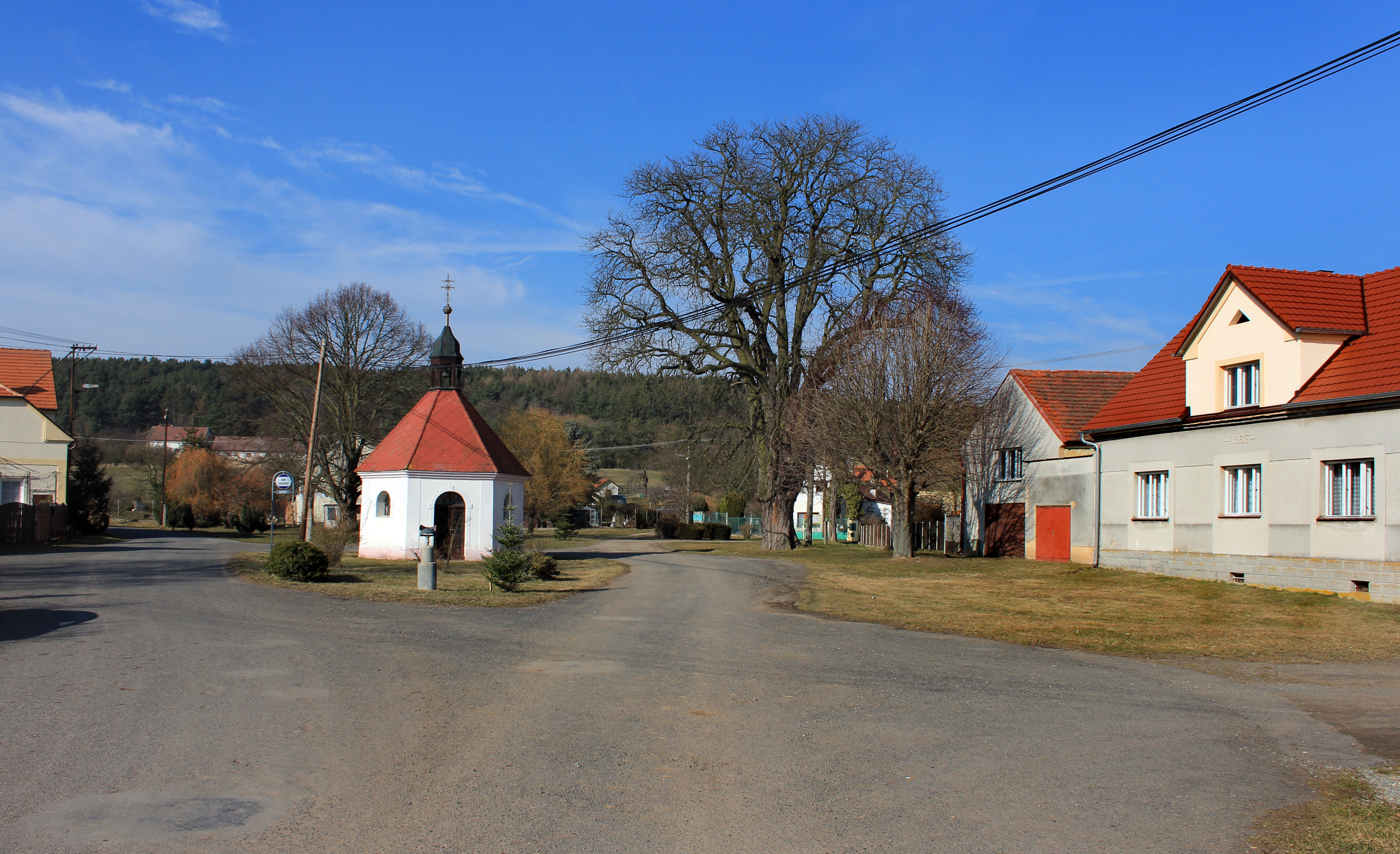
- Centre of Kbelany

- Flag Coat of arms

- Location in the Czech Republic
- Coordinates: 49°43′57″N 13°7′35″E
- Country: Czech Republic
- Region: Plzeň
- District: Plzeň-North
- First mentioned: 1239

Area
  - Total: 6.88 km^{2} (2.66 sq mi)
- Elevation: 403 m (1,322 ft)

Population (2026-01-01)
  - Total: 127
  - Density: 18.5/km^{2} (47.8/sq mi)
- Time zone: UTC+1 (CET)
  - Summer (DST): UTC+2 (CEST)
- Postal code: 330 23
- Website: www.kbelany.cz

Kbelany (German: Wellana) is a municipality and village in Plzeň-North District in the Plzeň Region of the Czech Republic. It has about 100 inhabitants.

== Etymology ==
The name was probably derived from the personal name Kbel, or referred to settlers who came from a place called Kbel or Kbely.

== Geography ==
Kbelany is located about 17 kilometres (11 mi) west of Plzeň. It lies in the Plasy Uplands. The highest point is the hill Harabaska at 502 m (1,647 ft) above sea level.

== History ==
The first written mention of Kbelany is from 1239, when the village was owned by the monastery in Kladruby. The monastery owned Kbelany until its abolition in the second half of the 18th century. During the 19th century, the village expanded considerably. In 1938, the municipality was annexed by Nazi Germany. After World War II, the German-speaking population was expelled.

== Demographics ==
Historical population

Year	Pop.	±%
1869	183	—
1880	373	+103.8%
1890	359	−3.8%
1900	299	−16.7%
1910	267	−10.7%

Year	Pop.	±%
1921	283	+6.0%
1930	254	−10.2%
1950	172	−32.3%
1961	173	+0.6%
1970	105	−39.3%

Year	Pop.	±%
1980	76	−27.6%
1991	54	−28.9%
2001	69	+27.8%
2011	100	+44.9%
2021	106	+6.0%

Source: Censuses

== Transport ==
The D5 motorway (part of the European route E50) from Plzeň to the Czech–German border in Rozvadov runs along the southern municipal border.

Kbelany is located on the railway line of local importance from Nýřany to Heřmanova Huť. The train station in the municipality is called Přehýšov after the neighbouring municipality of Přehýšov.

== Sights ==
The only protected cultural monuments in the municipality are a stone conciliation cross and a border stone, both from the 16th century. A historical landmark is the Chapel of the Visitation of the Virgin Mary, located in the centre of the village.
