= Všenice =

- Municipality
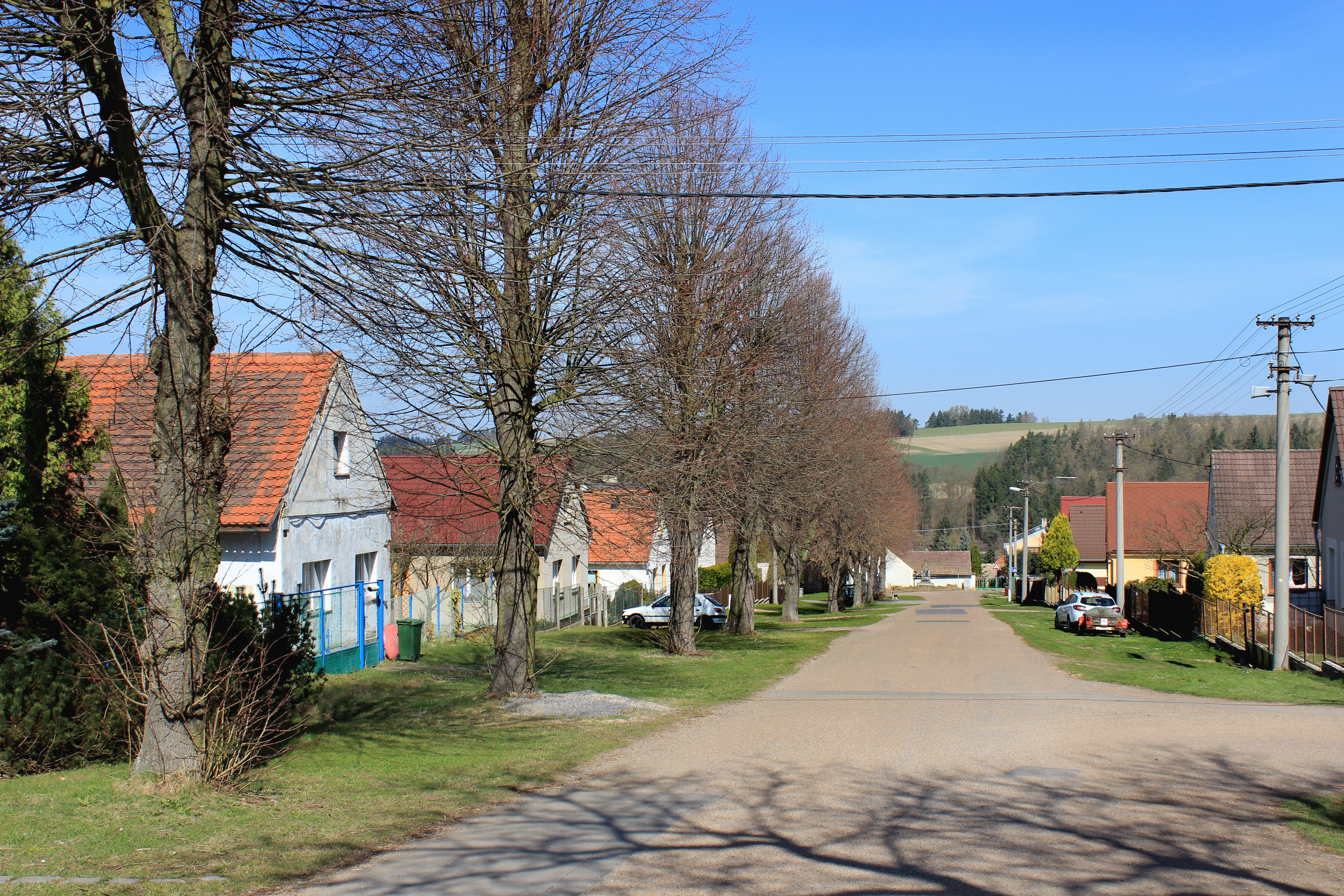
- Southern part of Všenice

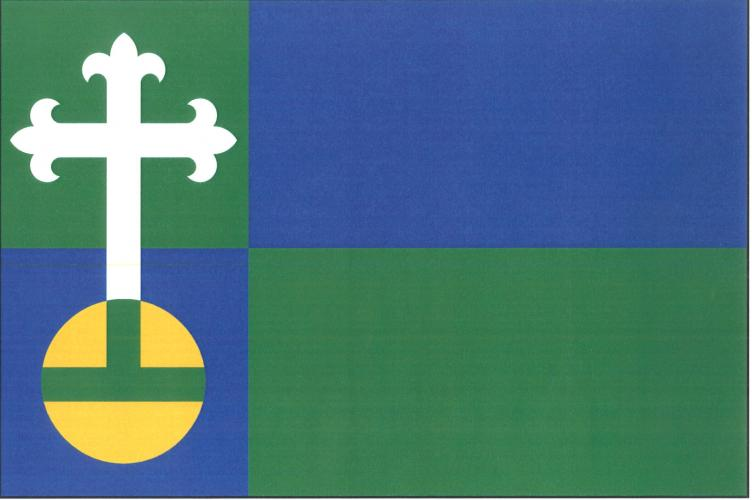
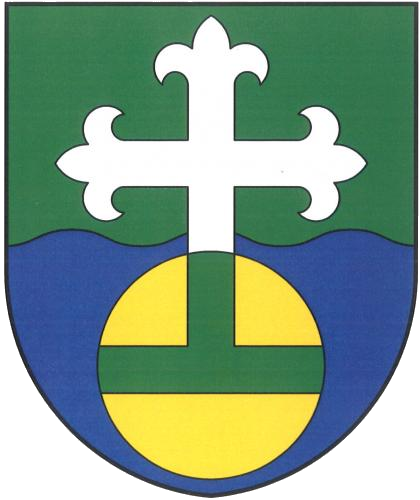
- Flag Coat of arms

- Location in the Czech Republic
- Coordinates: 49°49′5″N 13°33′39″E
- Country: Czech Republic
- Region: Plzeň
- District: Rokycany
- First mentioned: 1115

Area
  - Total: 2.68 km^{2} (1.03 sq mi)
- Elevation: 377 m (1,237 ft)

Population (2026-01-01)
  - Total: 298
  - Density: 111/km^{2} (288/sq mi)
- Time zone: UTC+1 (CET)
  - Summer (DST): UTC+2 (CEST)
- Postal code: 338 24
- Website: www.vsenice.cz

Všenice is a municipality and village in Rokycany District in the Plzeň Region of the Czech Republic. It has about 300 inhabitants.

Všenice lies approximately 8 kilometres (5 mi) north of Rokycany, 16 km (10 mi) north-east of Plzeň, and 69 km (43 mi) south-west of Prague.

== Demographics ==
Historical population
Year	Pop.	±%
1869	324	—
1880	350	+8.0%
1890	313	−10.6%
1900	305	−2.6%
1910	354	+16.1%
1921	362	+2.3%
1930	360	−0.6%
1950	292	−18.9%
1961	323	+10.6%
1970	294	−9.0%
1980	244	−17.0%
1991	224	−8.2%
2001	218	−2.7%
2011	237	+8.7%
2021	283	+19.4%
Source: Censuses

== Transport ==
Všenice is located on the regional railway line Plzeň–Radnice.
