= Černovice (Plzeň-South District) =

- Municipality
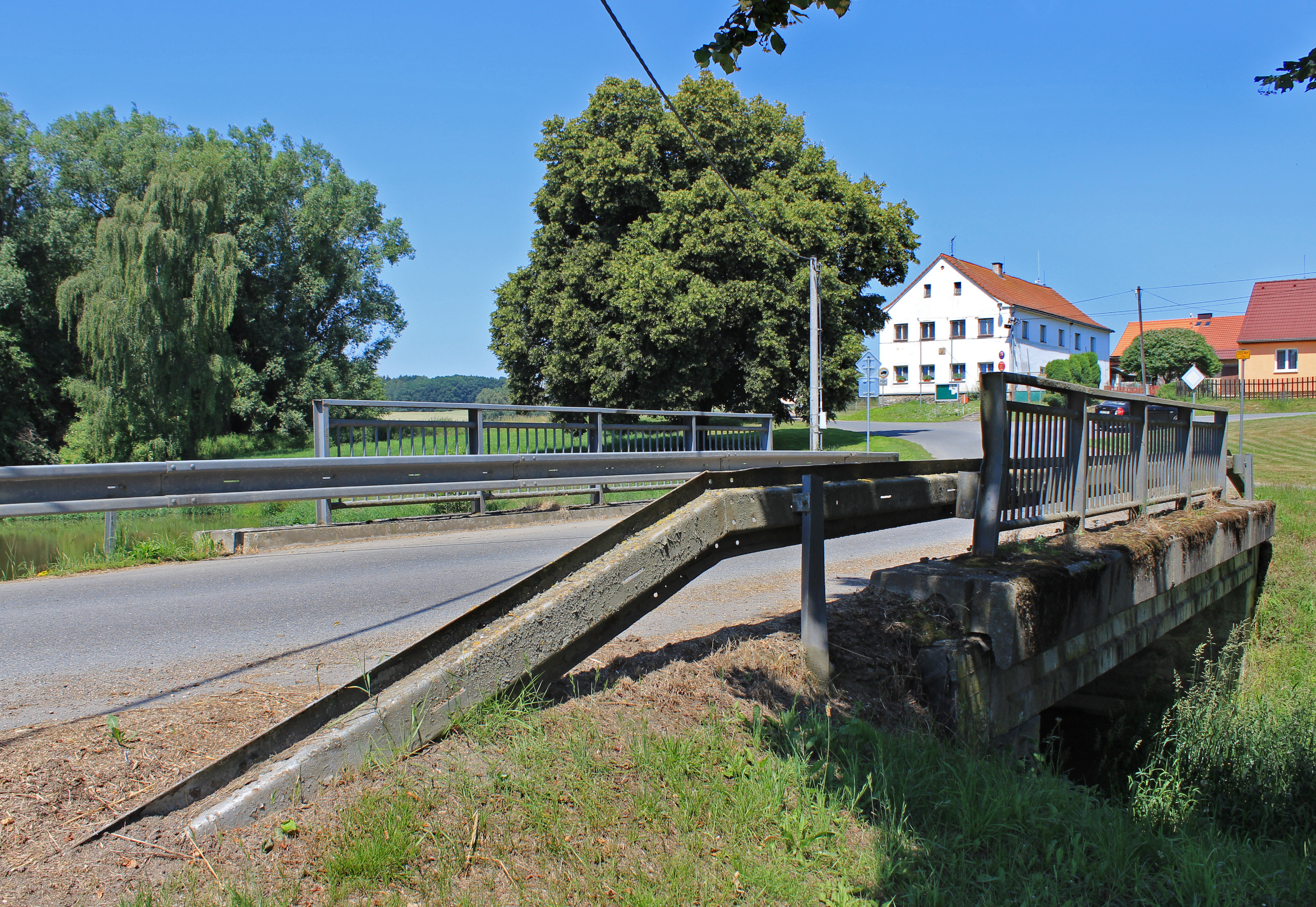
- Bridge over the Hořina creek with the municipal office in the background

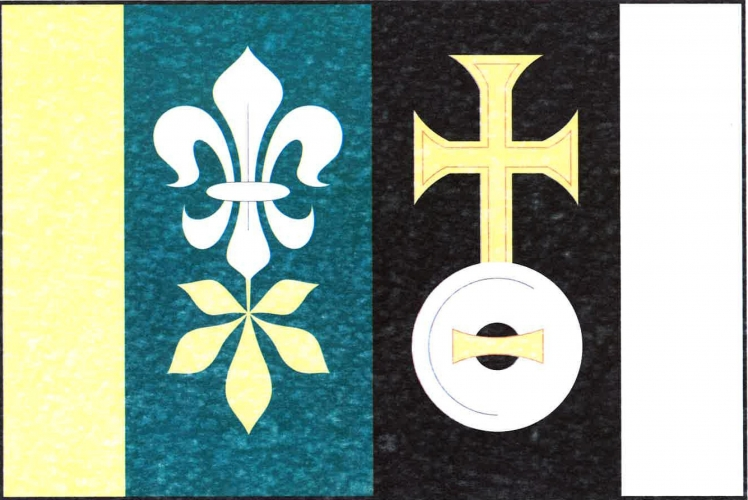
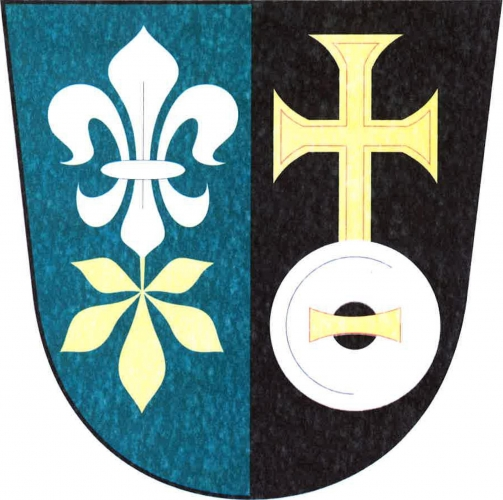
- Flag Coat of arms

- Location in the Czech Republic
- Coordinates: 49°36′56″N 12°59′49″E
- Country: Czech Republic
- Region: Plzeň
- District: Plzeň-South
- First mentioned: 1362

Area
  - Total: 6.97 km^{2} (2.69 sq mi)
- Elevation: 437 m (1,434 ft)

Population (2026-01-01)
  - Total: 138
  - Density: 19.8/km^{2} (51.3/sq mi)
- Time zone: UTC+1 (CET)
  - Summer (DST): UTC+2 (CEST)
- Postal code: 345 62
- Website: www.obec-cernovice.cz

Černovice is a municipality and village in Plzeň-South District in the Plzeň Region of the Czech Republic. It has about 100 inhabitants.

Černovice lies approximately 21 kilometres (13 mi) north of Domažlice, 31 km (19 mi) south-west of Plzeň, and 115 km (71 mi) south-west of Prague.

== Administrative division ==
Černovice consists of two municipal parts (in brackets population according to the 2021 census):

- Černovice (158)
- Nemněnice (20)

== History ==
The first written mention of Černovice is from 1362.

From 1 January 2021, Černovice is no longer a part of Domažlice District and belongs to Plzeň-South District.

== Demographics ==
Historical population
Year	Pop.	±%
1869	257	—
1880	274	+6.6%
1890	227	−17.2%
1900	315	+38.8%
1910	302	−4.1%
1921	295	−2.3%
1930	269	−8.8%
1950	121	−55.0%
1961	218	+80.2%
1970	228	+4.6%
1980	234	+2.6%
1991	199	−15.0%
2001	205	+3.0%
2011	175	−14.6%
2021	178	+1.7%
Source: Censuses
