= Zahrádka (Plzeň-North District) =

- Municipality
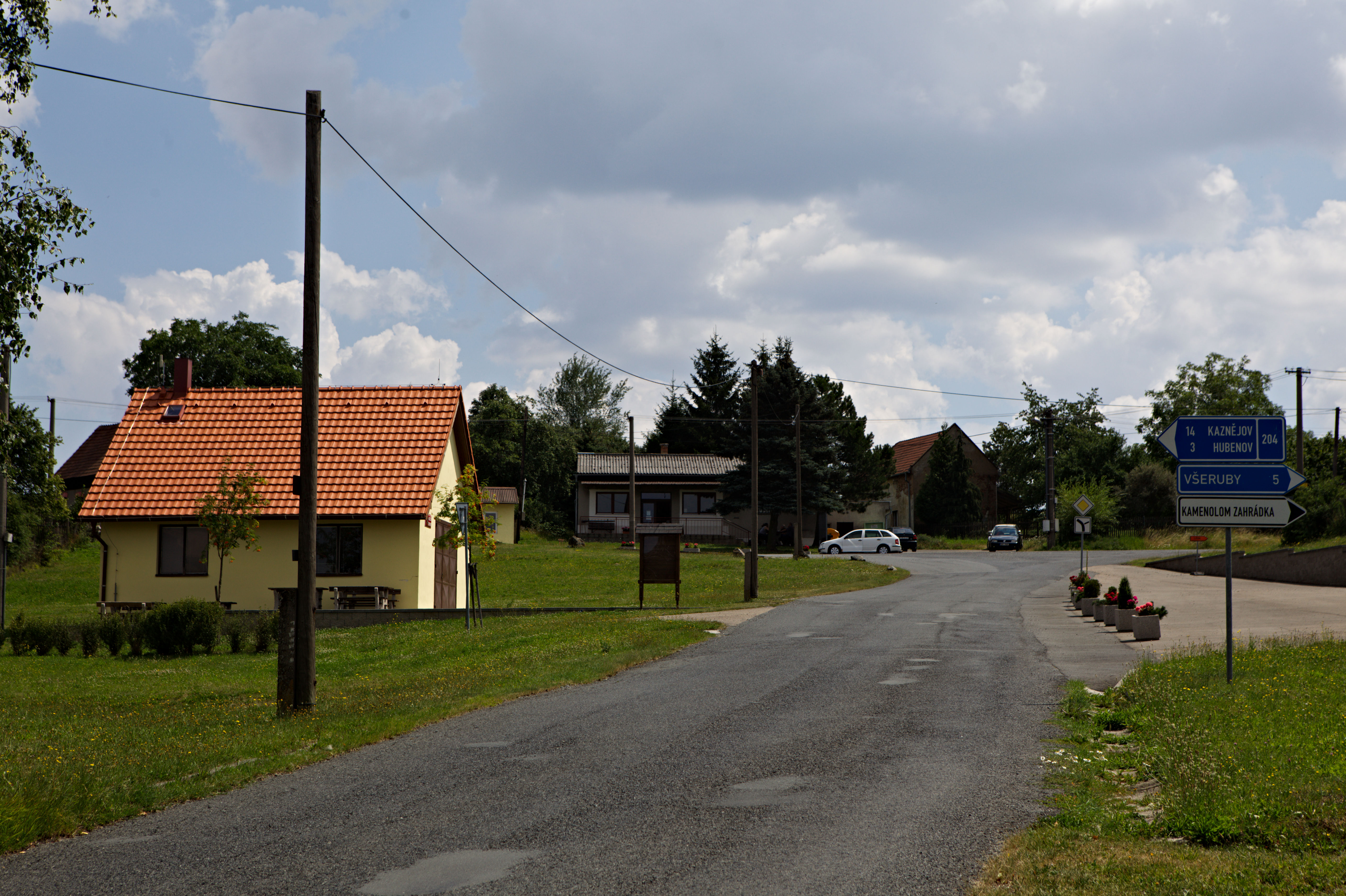
- Centre of Zahrádka

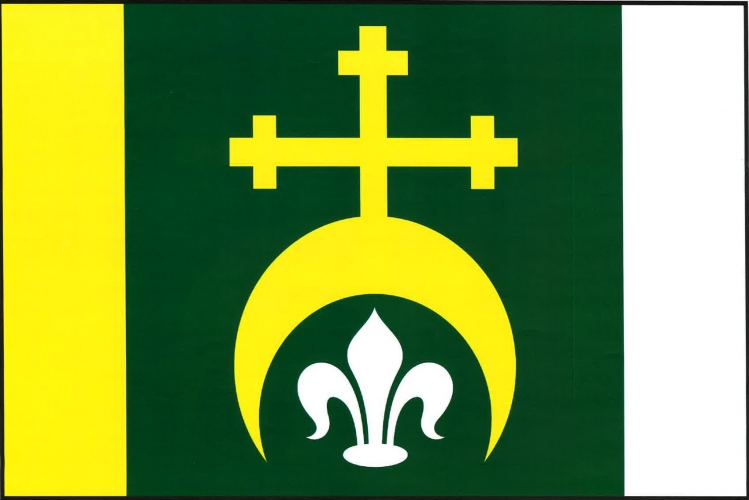
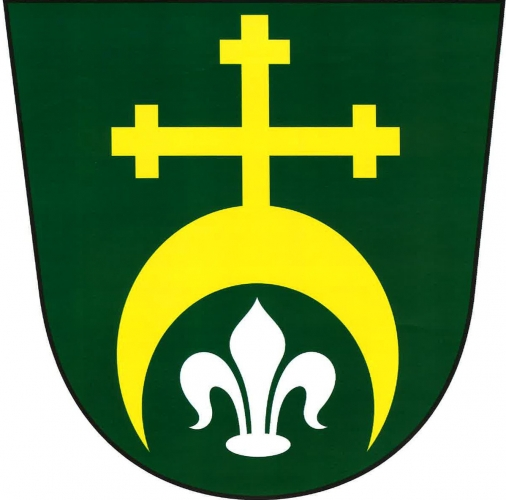
- Flag Coat of arms

- Location in the Czech Republic
- Coordinates: 49°52′51″N 13°12′42″E
- Country: Czech Republic
- Region: Plzeň
- District: Plzeň-North
- First mentioned: 1379

Area
  - Total: 15.33 km^{2} (5.92 sq mi)
- Elevation: 525 m (1,722 ft)

Population (2026-01-01)
  - Total: 171
  - Density: 11.2/km^{2} (28.9/sq mi)
- Time zone: UTC+1 (CET)
  - Summer (DST): UTC+2 (CEST)
- Postal codes: 330 35, 330 38
- Website: www.ou-zahradka.cz

Zahrádka is a municipality and village in Plzeň-North District in the Plzeň Region of the Czech Republic. It has about 200 inhabitants.

Zahrádka lies approximately 20 kilometres (12 mi) north-west of Plzeň and 90 km (56 mi) west of Prague.

== Administrative division ==
Zahrádka consists of three municipal parts (in brackets population according to the 2021 census):

- Zahrádka (43)
- Hůrky (61)
- Mostice (29)

== Demographics ==
Historical population
Year	Pop.	±%
1869	446	—
1880	434	−2.7%
1890	409	−5.8%
1900	375	−8.3%
1910	389	+3.7%
1921	392	+0.8%
1930	399	+1.8%
1950	222	−44.4%
1961	199	−10.4%
1970	197	−1.0%
1980	179	−9.1%
1991	153	−14.5%
2001	141	−7.8%
2011	140	−0.7%
2021	133	−5.0%
Source: Censuses
