= Mešno =

- Municipality
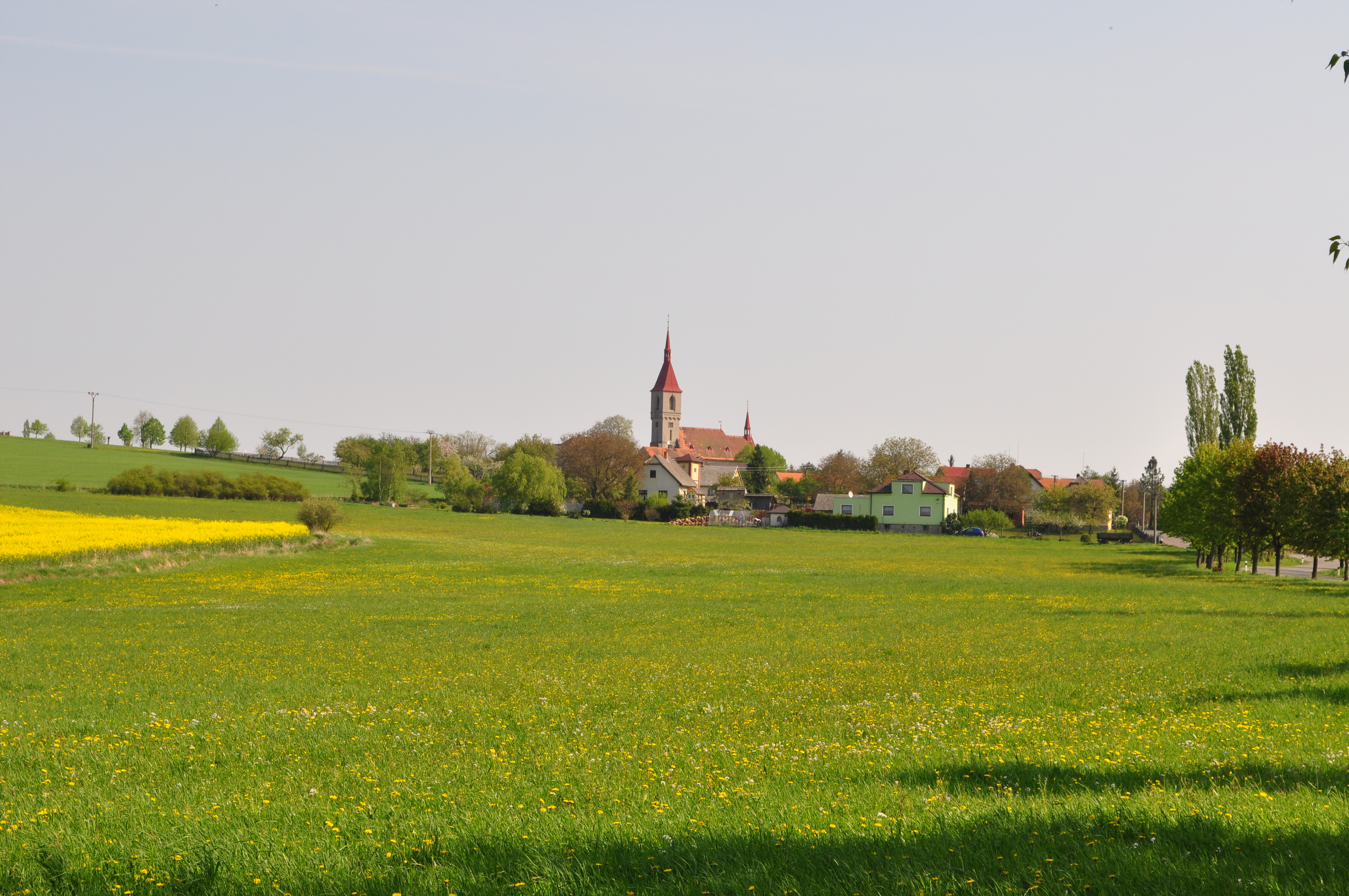
- View from the south

- Location in the Czech Republic
- Coordinates: 49°39′21″N 13°37′19″E
- Country: Czech Republic
- Region: Plzeň
- District: Rokycany
- First mentioned: 1352

Area
  - Total: 5.82 km^{2} (2.25 sq mi)
- Elevation: 492 m (1,614 ft)

Population (2026-01-01)
  - Total: 80
  - Density: 14/km^{2} (36/sq mi)
- Time zone: UTC+1 (CET)
  - Summer (DST): UTC+2 (CEST)
- Postal code: 338 43
- Website: www.mesno.cz

Mešno is a municipality and village in Rokycany District in the Plzeň Region of the Czech Republic. It has about 80 inhabitants.

Mešno lies approximately 12 kilometres (7 mi) south of Rokycany, 21 km (13 mi) south-east of Plzeň, and 75 km (47 mi) south-west of Prague.

== Demographics ==
Historical population
Year	Pop.	±%
1869	217	—
1880	246	+13.4%
1890	242	−1.6%
1900	212	−12.4%
1910	201	−5.2%
1921	202	+0.5%
1930	174	−13.9%
1950	141	−19.0%
1961	129	−8.5%
1970	117	−9.3%
1980	98	−16.2%
1991	81	−17.3%
2001	87	+7.4%
2011	84	−3.4%
2021	72	−14.3%
Source: Censuses
