= Čerňovice =

- Municipality
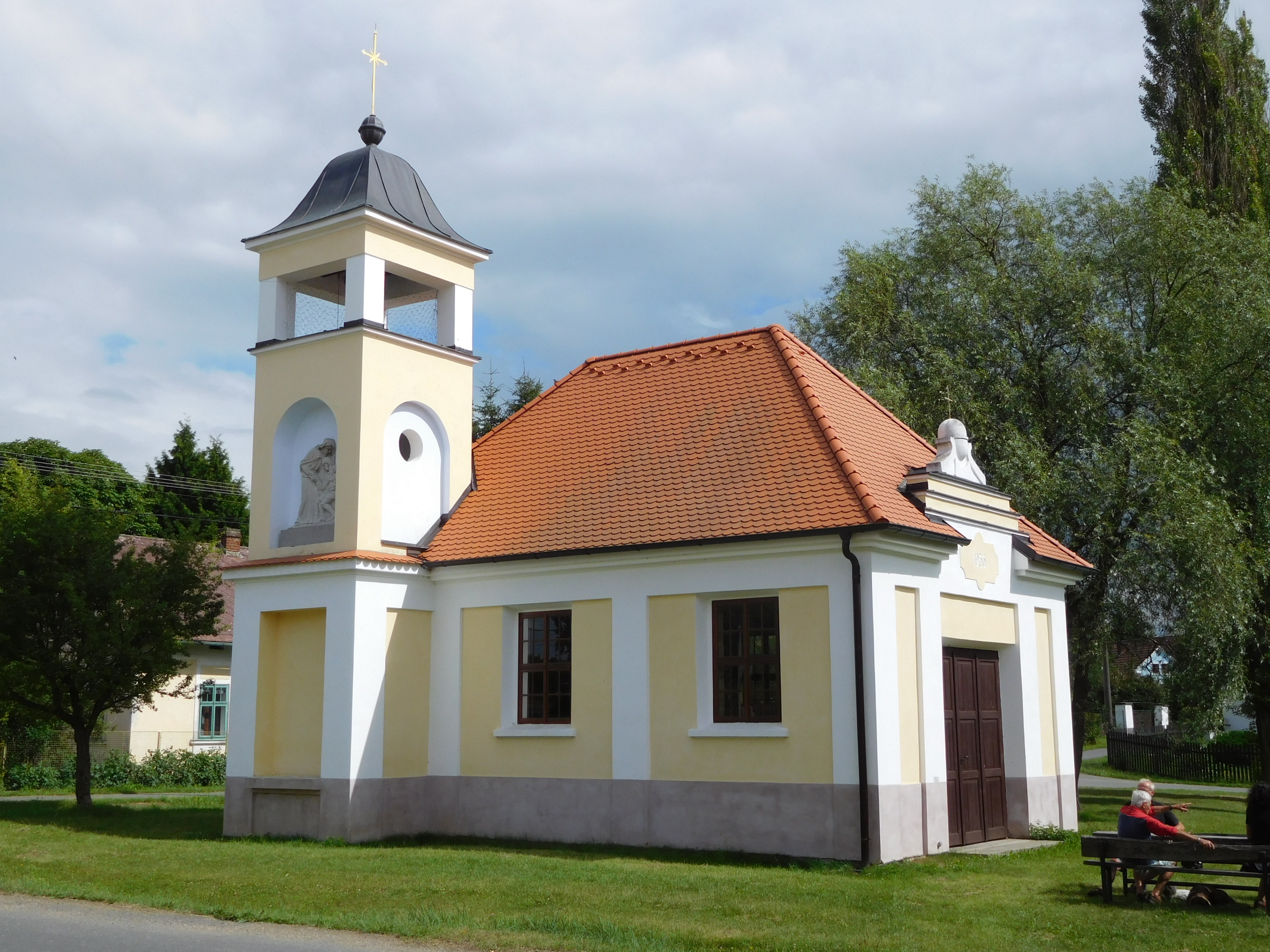
- Chapel of the Holy Trinity

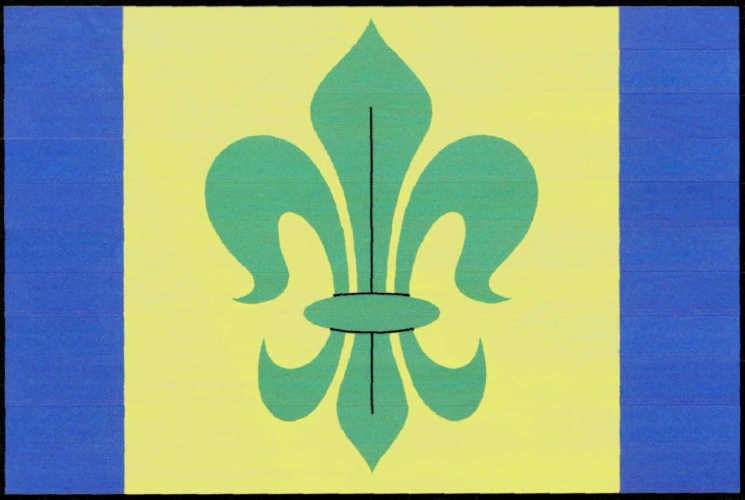
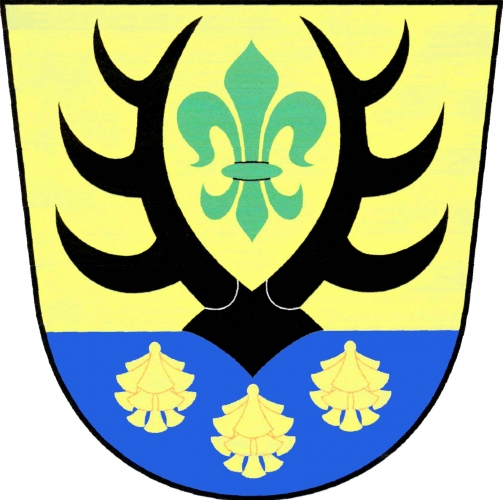
- Flag Coat of arms

- Location in the Czech Republic
- Coordinates: 49°48′47″N 13°6′13″E
- Country: Czech Republic
- Region: Plzeň
- District: Plzeň-North
- First mentioned: 1219

Area
  - Total: 9.25 km^{2} (3.57 sq mi)
- Elevation: 402 m (1,319 ft)

Population (2026-01-01)
  - Total: 201
  - Density: 21.7/km^{2} (56.3/sq mi)
- Time zone: UTC+1 (CET)
  - Summer (DST): UTC+2 (CEST)
- Postal code: 330 36
- Website: cernovice.info

Čerňovice is a municipality and village in Plzeň-North District in the Plzeň Region of the Czech Republic. It has about 200 inhabitants.

Čerňovice lies approximately 21 kilometres (13 mi) west of Plzeň and 99 km (62 mi) west of Prague.

== Demographics ==
Historical population
Year	Pop.	±%
1869	302	—
1880	290	−4.0%
1890	307	+5.9%
1900	323	+5.2%
1910	333	+3.1%
1921	323	−3.0%
1930	320	−0.9%
1950	210	−34.4%
1961	204	−2.9%
1970	184	−9.8%
1980	148	−19.6%
1991	111	−25.0%
2001	105	−5.4%
2011	139	+32.4%
2021	196	+41.0%
Source: Censuses
