= Střížovice (Plzeň-South District) =

Municipality in the Czech Republic

- Municipality
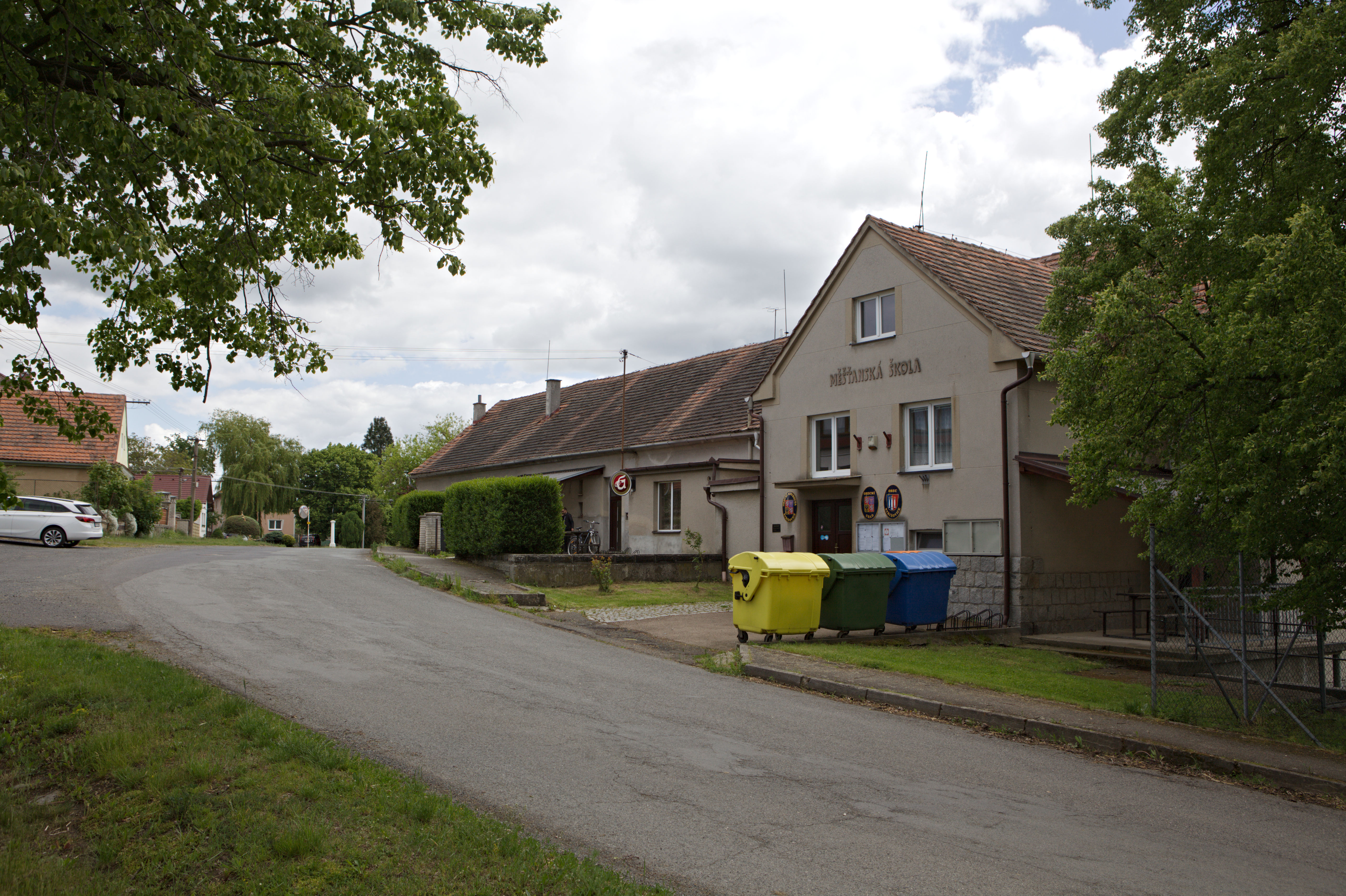
- Municipal office

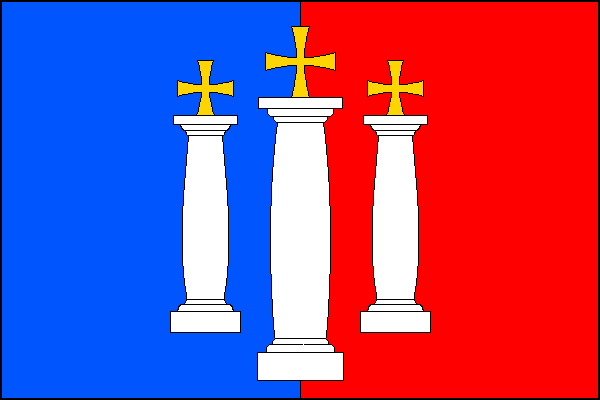
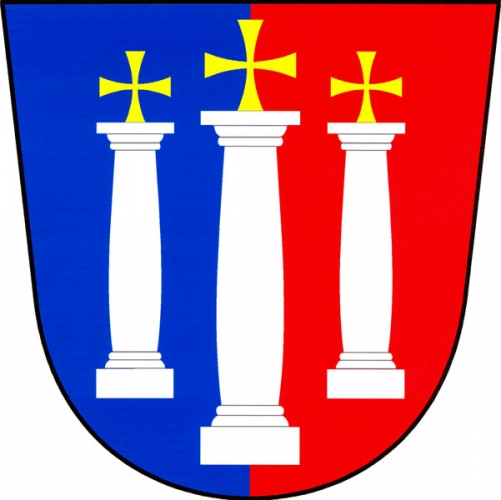
- Flag Coat of arms

- Location in the Czech Republic
- Coordinates: 49°36′43″N 13°27′30″E
- Country: Czech Republic
- Region: Plzeň
- District: Plzeň-South
- First mentioned: 1379

Area
  - Total: 6.89 km^{2} (2.66 sq mi)
- Elevation: 470 m (1,540 ft)

Population (2026-01-01)
  - Total: 374
  - Density: 54.3/km^{2} (141/sq mi)
- Time zone: UTC+1 (CET)
  - Summer (DST): UTC+2 (CEST)
- Postal code: 332 07
- Website: www.strizovice.eu

Střížovice is a municipality and village in Plzeň-South District in the Plzeň Region of the Czech Republic. It has about 400 inhabitants.

== Geography ==
Střížovice is located about 14 kilometres (9 mi) south of Plzeň. It lies in the Švihov Highlands. The highest point is at 526 m (1,726 ft) above sea level. The Úslava River flows through the municipality.

== History ==
The first written mention of Střížovice is from 1379. Until the establishment of an independent municipality in 1848, the village was divided into two parts with different owners. One part belonged to the Dolní Lukavice estate and the second part belonged to the Nebílovy (and later Šťáhlavy) estate.

== Demographics ==
Historical population

Year	Pop.	±%
1869	458	—
1880	476	+3.9%
1890	438	−8.0%
1900	477	+8.9%
1910	516	+8.2%

Year	Pop.	±%
1921	506	−1.9%
1930	476	−5.9%
1950	414	−13.0%
1961	384	−7.2%
1970	360	−6.2%

Year	Pop.	±%
1980	347	−3.6%
1991	323	−6.9%
2001	325	+0.6%
2011	378	+16.3%
2021	384	+1.6%

Source: Censuses

== Transport ==
There are no railways or major roads passing through the municipality.

== Sights ==
The only protected cultural monument in the municipality is a memorial cross from around 1825.
