= Blažim (Plzeň-North District) =

- Municipality
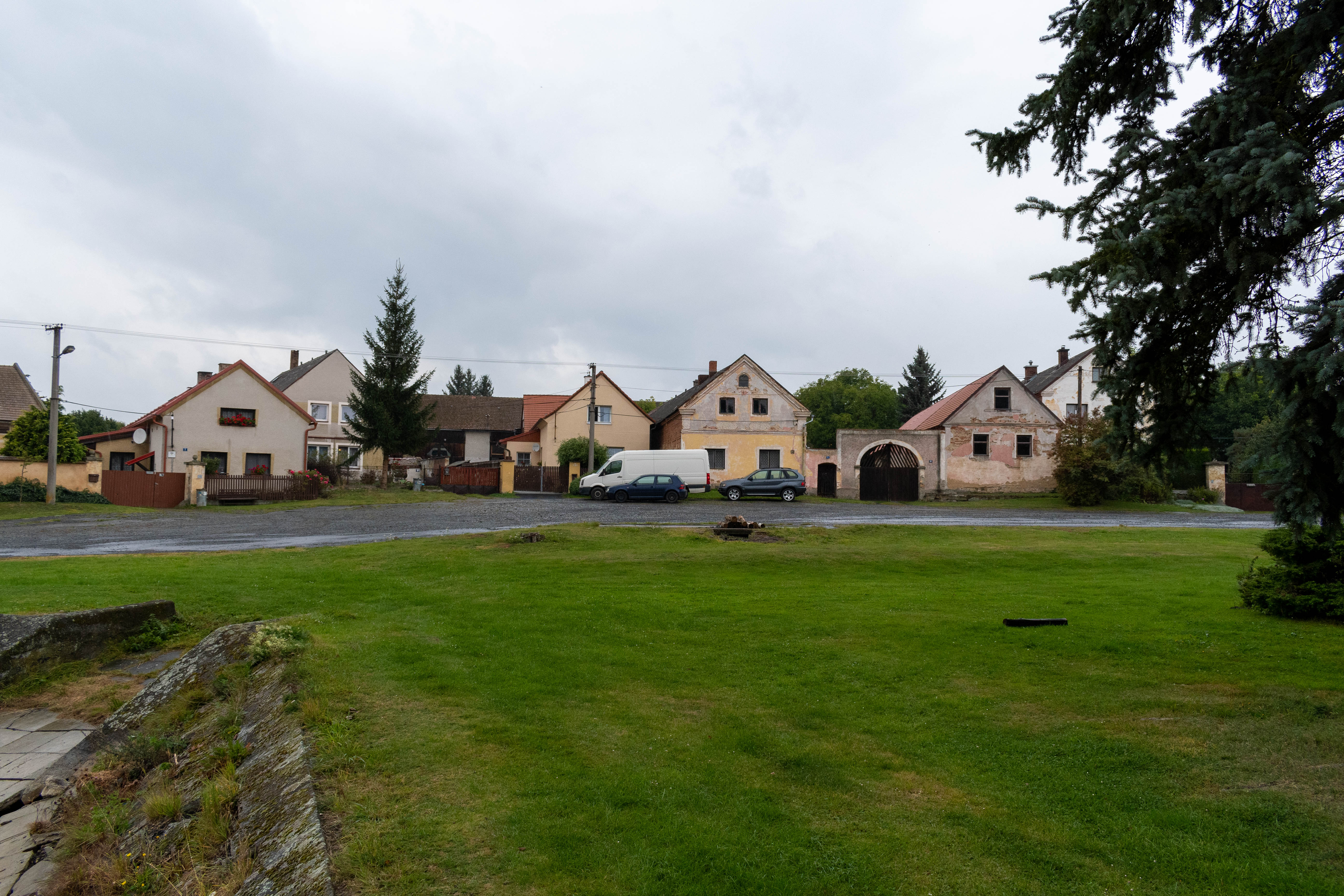
- Centre of Blažim

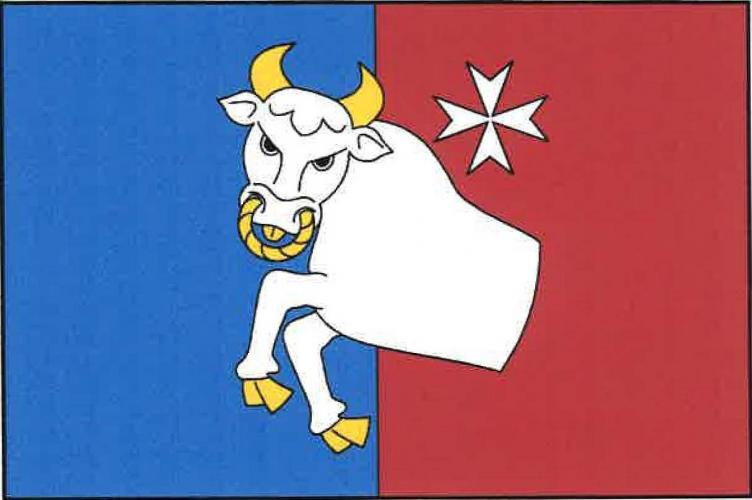
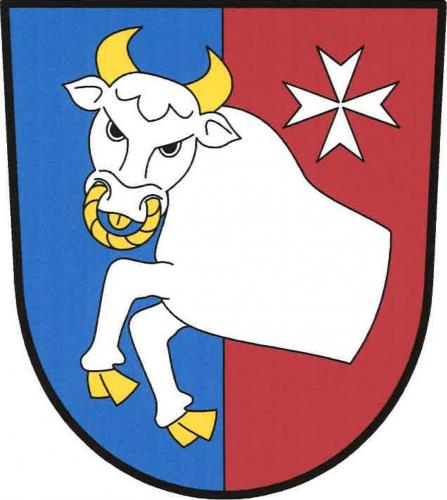
- Flag Coat of arms

- Location in the Czech Republic
- Coordinates: 49°54′58″N 13°2′52″E
- Country: Czech Republic
- Region: Plzeň
- District: Plzeň-North
- First mentioned: 1183

Area
  - Total: 5.93 km^{2} (2.29 sq mi)
- Elevation: 545 m (1,788 ft)

Population (2026-01-01)
  - Total: 63
  - Density: 11/km^{2} (28/sq mi)
- Time zone: UTC+1 (CET)
  - Summer (DST): UTC+2 (CEST)
- Postal code: 330 38
- Website: www.obec-blazim.cz

Blažim (German: Plaschin) is a municipality and village in Plzeň-North District in the Plzeň Region of the Czech Republic. It has about 60 inhabitants.

Blažim lies approximately 30 kilometres (19 mi) north-west of Plzeň and 101 km (63 mi) west of Prague.

== Demographics ==
Historical population
Year	Pop.	±%
1869	216	—
1880	230	+6.5%
1890	217	−5.7%
1900	227	+4.6%
1910	223	−1.8%
1921	228	+2.2%
1930	225	−1.3%
1950	111	−50.7%
1961	119	+7.2%
1970	100	−16.0%
1980	104	+4.0%
1991	79	−24.0%
2001	86	+8.9%
2011	57	−33.7%
2021	63	+10.5%
Source: Censuses
