= Plzeň =

City in the Czech Republic

Plzeň Pilsen
- Statutory city
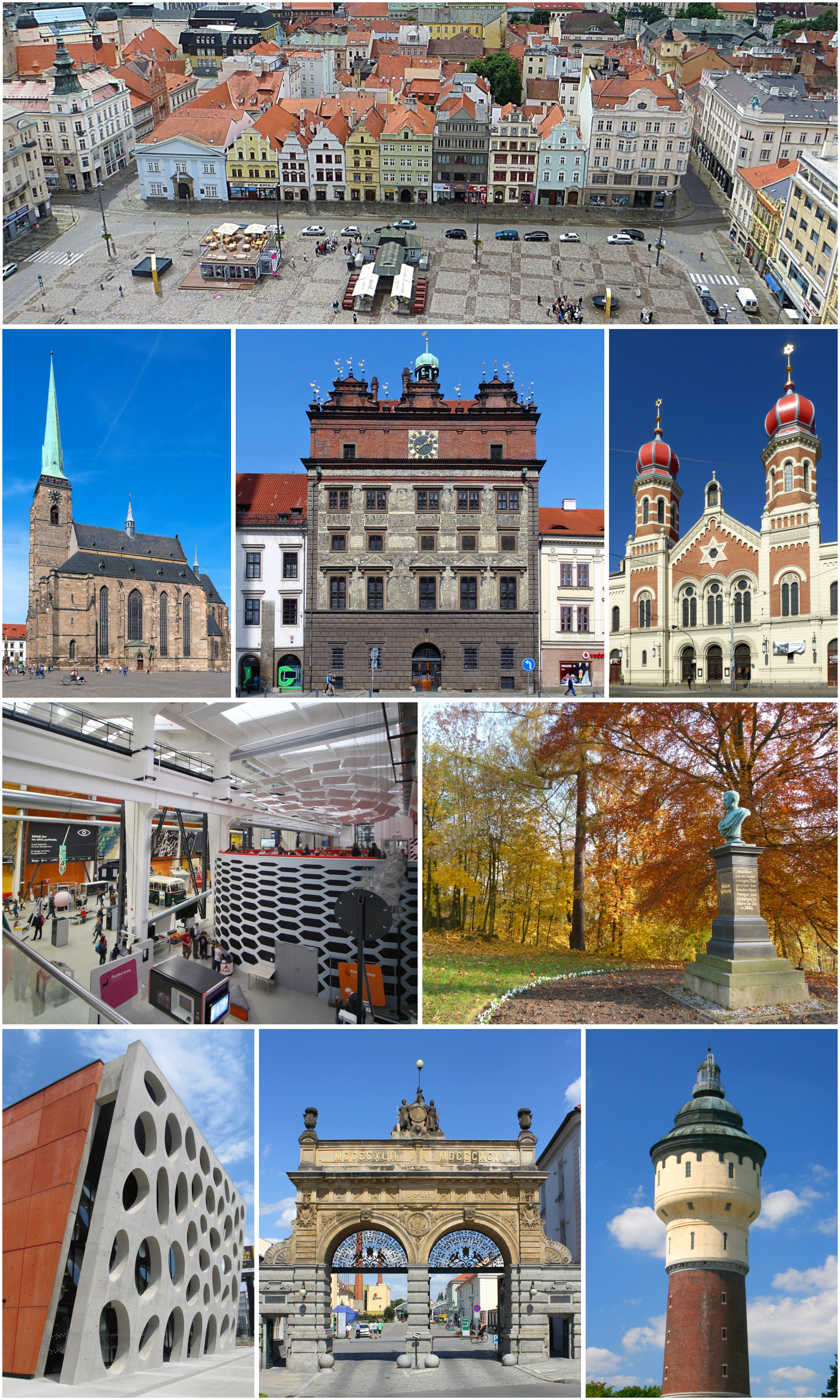
- From top: Náměstí Republiky; Cathedral of St. Bartholomew; City Hall, Great Synagogue; Techmania Science Center; Lochotín park, New Theatre; Prazdroj brewery gate; and brewery water tower

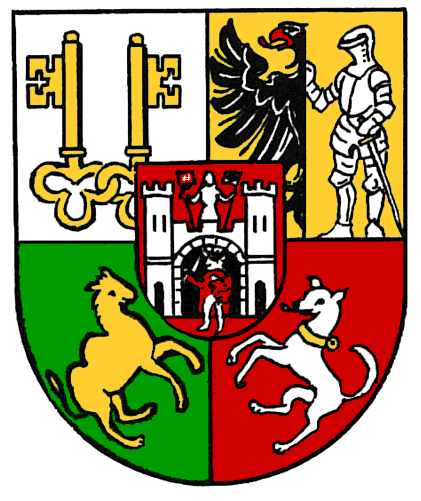
- Flag Coat of arms Wordmark
- Motto: In hoc signo vinces
- Location in the Czech Republic
- Coordinates: 49°44′51″N 13°22′39″E
- Country: Czech Republic
- Region: Plzeň
- District: Plzeň-City
- Founded: 1295

Government
  - Mayor: Roman Zarzycký (ANO 2011)

Area
  - Total: 137.67 km^{2} (53.15 sq mi)
- Elevation: 310 m (1,020 ft)

Population (2026-01-01)
  - Total: 187,863
  - Density: 1,364.6/km^{2} (3,534.3/sq mi)
- Time zone: UTC+1 (CET)
  - Summer (DST): UTC+2 (CEST)
- Postal codes: 301 00 – 326 00
- Website: pilsen.eu

Plzeň (Czech pronunciation: [ˈpl̩zɛɲ]), also known in English and German as Pilsen (German: [ˈpɪlzn̩]), is a city in the Czech Republic. It is the fourth most populous city in the Czech Republic with about 188,000 inhabitants. It is located about 78 kilometres (48 miles) west of Prague, at the confluence of four rivers: Mže, Úhlava, Úslava and Radbuza, together forming the Berounka River.

Founded as a royal city in the late 13th century, Plzeň became an important town for trade on routes linking Bohemia with Bavaria. By the 14th century, it had grown to be the third-largest city in Bohemia. The city was besieged three times during the 15th century Hussite Wars, when it became a centre of resistance against the Hussites. During the Thirty Years' War in the early 17th century, the city was temporarily occupied after the Siege of Plzeň.

In the 19th century, the city rapidly industrialised and became home to the Škoda Works, which became one of the most important engineering companies in Austria-Hungary and later in Czechoslovakia. The city is known worldwide as the home of Pilsner beer, created by Bavarian brewer Josef Groll in the city in 1842; today, the Pilsner Urquell Brewery is the largest brewery in the Czech Republic.

Plzeň serves as the main business centre and the capital of the Plzeň Region. The historic city centre is protected as an urban monument reservation known for its Baroque architecture, and was European Capital of Culture in 2015. Plzeň is home to football club FC Viktoria Plzeň and ice hockey club HC Škoda Plzeň.

== Administrative division ==
Plzeň consists of ten self-governing boroughs. In addition, Plzeň consists of 25 municipal parts, whose borders do not respect the boundaries of boroughs (in brackets population according to the 2021 census):

- Plzeň 1 (48,572)
  - Bolevec (29,697)
  - Severní Předměstí (18,875)
- Plzeň 2-Slovany (36,000)
  - Božkov (2,254)
  - Černice (2,482)
  - Doudlevce (537)
  - Hradiště (1,876)
  - Koterov (2,325)
  - Lobzy (3,101)
  - Východní Předměstí (23,425)
- Plzeň 3 (55,363)
  - Doudlevce (3,828)
  - Jižní Předměstí (30,858)
  - Litice (1,109)
  - Nová Hospoda (968)
  - Radobyčice (1,476)
  - Skvrňany (12,802)
  - Valcha (1,459)
  - Vnitřní Město (1,621)
  - Východní Předměstí (1,242)
- Plzeň 4 (23,819)
  - Bukovec (567)
  - Červený Hrádek (1,228)
  - Doubravka (11,605)
  - Lobzy (7,643)
  - Újezd (2,670)
  - Východní Předměstí (106)
- Plzeň 5-Křimice (2,429)
  - Křimice (2,429)
- Plzeň 6-Litice (2,229)
  - Litice (2,229)
- Plzeň 7-Radčice (1,090)
  - Radčice (1,090)
- Plzeň 8-Černice (1,868)
  - Černice (1,868)
- Plzeň 9-Malesice (945)
  - Dolní Vlkýš (154)
  - Malesice (791)
- Plzeň 10-Lhota (1,692)
  - Lhota (1,692)

== Geography ==
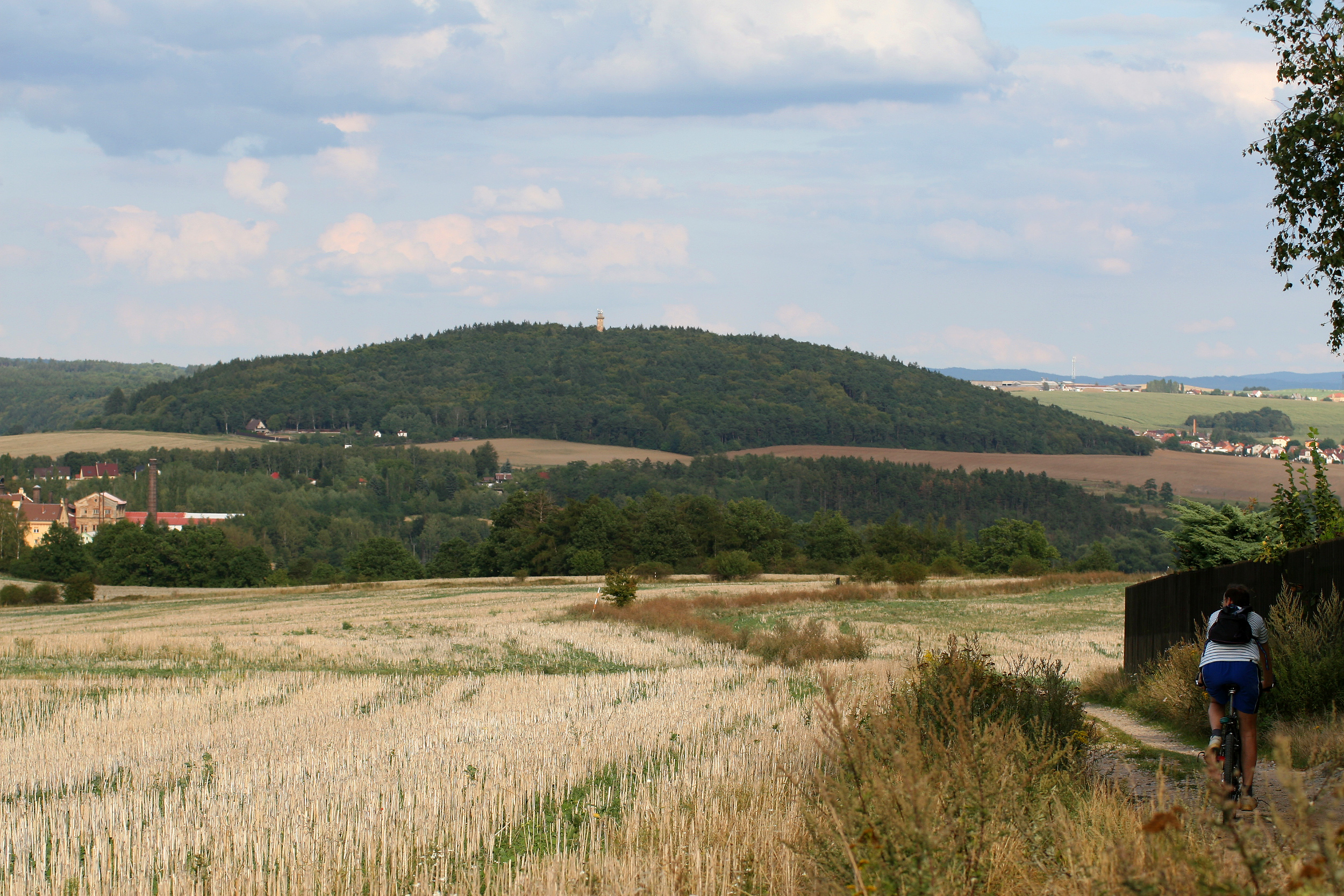
Chlum, the highest point in Plzeň

Plzeň is located about 78 km (48 mi) west of Prague. The city is situated at the confluences of four rivers: Mže, Úhlava, Úslava and Radbuza. From the confluence of the Mže and Radbuza, the river is known as the Berounka. Plzeň lies mostly in the Plasy Uplands, with small parts of the municipal territory extending into the Švihov Highlands to the east and south. The highest point is the hill Chlum at 416 m (1,365 ft) above sea level. The lowest point is the river bed of the Berounka at 293 m (961 ft). The largest body of water is the České údolí Reservoir, built on the Radbuza. A system of fishponds is located on the northern edge of the city.

=== Climate ===
Plzeň has a cool and temperate Oceanic climate (Cfb). The average annual precipitation is 525 mm (21 in). The annual average temperature is 8.4 °C (47.1 °F). The extreme temperature throughout the year ranged from −28.0 °C (−18.4 °F) on 12 February 1985 to 41.5 °C (106.7 °F) on 4 August 2026.

Climate data for Plzeň-Bolevec, 1991–2020 normals, extremes 1969–present
Month	Jan	Feb	Mar	Apr	May	Jun	Jul	Aug	Sep	Oct	Nov	Dec	Year
Record high °C (°F)	16.8 (62.2)	19.4 (66.9)	24.7 (76.5)	31.0 (87.8)	33.7 (92.7)	38.1 (100.6)	40.1 (104.2)	41.5 (106.7)	34.9 (94.8)	28.3 (82.9)	19.2 (66.6)	16.9 (62.4)	41.5 (106.7)
Mean daily maximum °C (°F)	2.4 (36.3)	4.8 (40.6)	9.8 (49.6)	16.1 (61.0)	20.6 (69.1)	24.0 (75.2)	26.1 (79.0)	25.9 (78.6)	20.3 (68.5)	13.8 (56.8)	6.9 (44.4)	3.0 (37.4)	14.5 (58.1)
Daily mean °C (°F)	−0.8 (30.6)	−0.1 (31.8)	3.4 (38.1)	8.3 (46.9)	13.2 (55.8)	16.8 (62.2)	18.4 (65.1)	17.6 (63.7)	12.6 (54.7)	7.9 (46.2)	3.4 (38.1)	0.1 (32.2)	8.4 (47.1)
Mean daily minimum °C (°F)	−4.1 (24.6)	−4.2 (24.4)	−1.4 (29.5)	1.4 (34.5)	6.0 (42.8)	9.8 (49.6)	11.5 (52.7)	11.0 (51.8)	7.0 (44.6)	3.3 (37.9)	0.2 (32.4)	−2.8 (27.0)	3.1 (37.6)
Record low °C (°F)	−27.2 (−17.0)	−28.0 (−18.4)	−27.6 (−17.7)	−11.1 (12.0)	−4.6 (23.7)	−3.0 (26.6)	1.4 (34.5)	−0.9 (30.4)	−3.5 (25.7)	−10.8 (12.6)	−17.0 (1.4)	−27.9 (−18.2)	−28.0 (−18.4)
Average precipitation mm (inches)	28.1 (1.11)	22.8 (0.90)	30.9 (1.22)	32.2 (1.27)	56.9 (2.24)	70.8 (2.79)	72.0 (2.83)	65.6 (2.58)	43.4 (1.71)	39.1 (1.54)	32.3 (1.27)	31.4 (1.24)	525.4 (20.69)
Average snowfall cm (inches)	15.2 (6.0)	11.3 (4.4)	4.6 (1.8)	0.5 (0.2)	0.0 (0.0)	0.0 (0.0)	0.0 (0.0)	0.0 (0.0)	0.0 (0.0)	0.1 (0.0)	3.1 (1.2)	9.6 (3.8)	44.5 (17.5)
Average relative humidity (%)	84.9	80.7	77.0	71.8	71.1	71.6	72.1	74.5	80.1	84.2	88.0	87.3	78.6
Mean monthly sunshine hours	31.4	61.2	103.9	165.5	192.0	194.4	207.0	202.2	137.2	79.7	29.9	22.2	1,426.6
Source: Czech Hydrometeorological Institute

== History ==
=== Middle Ages ===
The first written mention of Plzeň Castle is from 976. The city of New Plzeň was founded nearby in 1295 by King Wenceslaus II. The old settlement then became known as Starý Plzenec and New Plzeň became known as Plzeň. It quickly became an important city on trade routes leading from Bohemia to Nuremberg and Regensburg. The first written mention of beer brewing is from 1307. In the 14th century, the city had about 3,000 inhabitants on an area of 20 ha (49 acres), making it the third largest city in Bohemia after Prague and Kutná Hora.

During the Hussite Wars, it was the centre of Catholic resistance to the Hussites: Prokop the Great unsuccessfully besieged it three times, and it joined the league of Catholic nobles against King George of Poděbrady. In the 1470s and 1480s, the city had the first printing press in Bohemia. The first book printed here and therefore the oldest book in Bohemia is Statuta written by Arnošt of Pardubice, which was printed in 1476.

=== 17th century ===
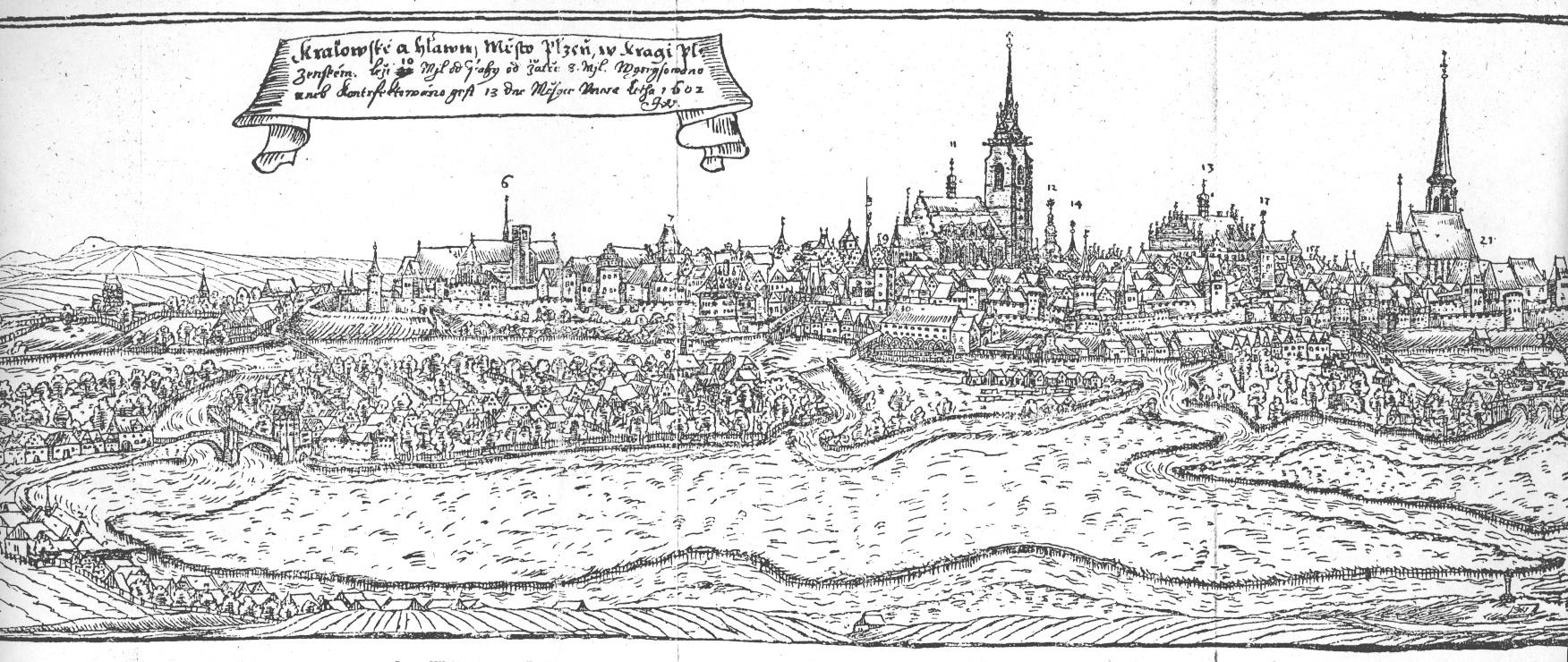
Engraving of Plzeň from 1602

Emperor Rudolf II made Plzeň his seat from 1599 to 1600. During the Thirty Years' War, the town was taken by Mansfeld in 1618 after the Siege of Plzeň, and it was not recaptured by Imperial troops until 1621. Wallenstein made it his winter quarters in 1633. Accused of treason and losing the support of his army, he fled the town on 23 February 1634 to Eger/Cheb, where he was assassinated two days later. The town was increasingly threatened by the Swedes in the last years of the war. The city commander Jan van der Croon strengthened the fortifications of Plzeň from 1645 to 1649. Swedish troops passed the town in 1645 and 1648 without attacking it. The town and region have been staunchly Catholic despite the Hussite Wars.

From the end of the 17th century, the architecture of Plzeň has been influenced by the Baroque style.

=== 19th century ===
In the second half of the 19th century, Plzeň, already an important trade centre for Bohemia, near the Bavarian/German border, began to industrialise rapidly. In 1869 Emil Škoda founded the Škoda Works, which became the most important and influential engineering company in the country and a crucial supplier of arms to the Austro-Hungarian Army. By 1917, the Škoda Works employed over 30,000 workers.

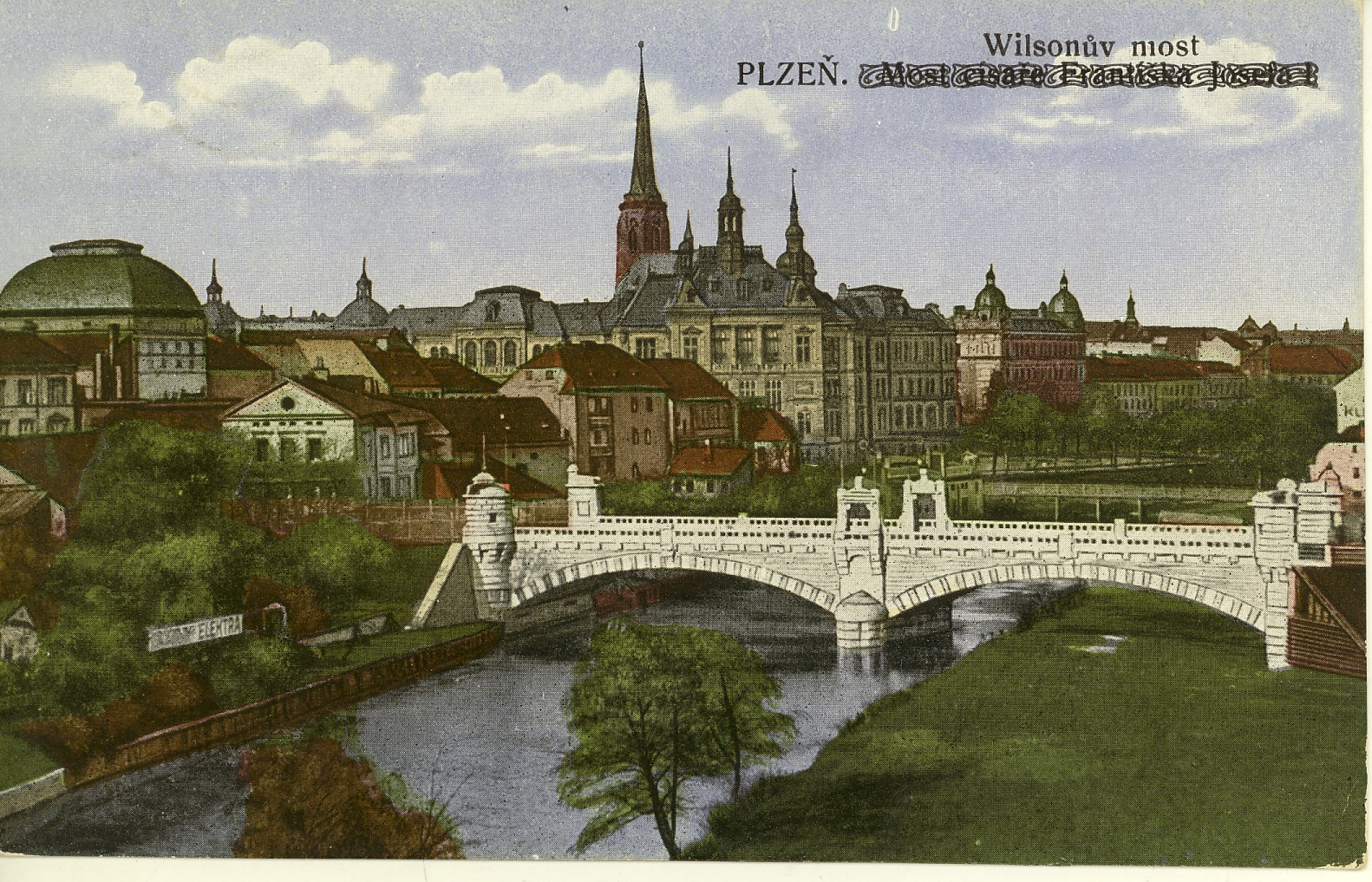
Plzeň in the interbellum

After 1898, the second largest employer was the National Railways train workshop, with about 2,000 employees: this was the largest rail repair shop in all Austria-Hungary. Between 1861 and 1877, the Plzeň railway junction was completed, and in 1899, the first tram line started in the city. This burst of industry had two important effects: the growth of the local Czech population and of the urban poor. After 1868, the first Czech mayor of the city was elected.

=== World War II ===
Following Czechoslovak independence from Austria-Hungary in 1918, the ethnic German minority in the countryside bordering the city of Plzeň hoped to be united with Austria and were unhappy at being included in Czechoslovakia. Many allied themselves to the Nazis after 1933 in the hope that Adolf Hitler might be able to unite them with their German-speaking neighbours.

Following the Munich Agreement in 1938, Plzeň became a frontier town as the creation of the Sudetenland moved Nazi Germany's borders closer to the city's outer limits. During the German occupation from 1939 to 1945, the Škoda Works in Pilsen was forced to provide armaments for the Wehrmacht, and Czech contributions, particularly in the field of tanks, were noted. The Nazis operated a Gestapo prison in the city, and a forced labour camp in the Karlov district.

Between 17 and 26 January 1942, the majority of the city's Jewish population, over 2,000 people, were deported by the Nazis to the Theresienstadt concentration camp in Terezín.

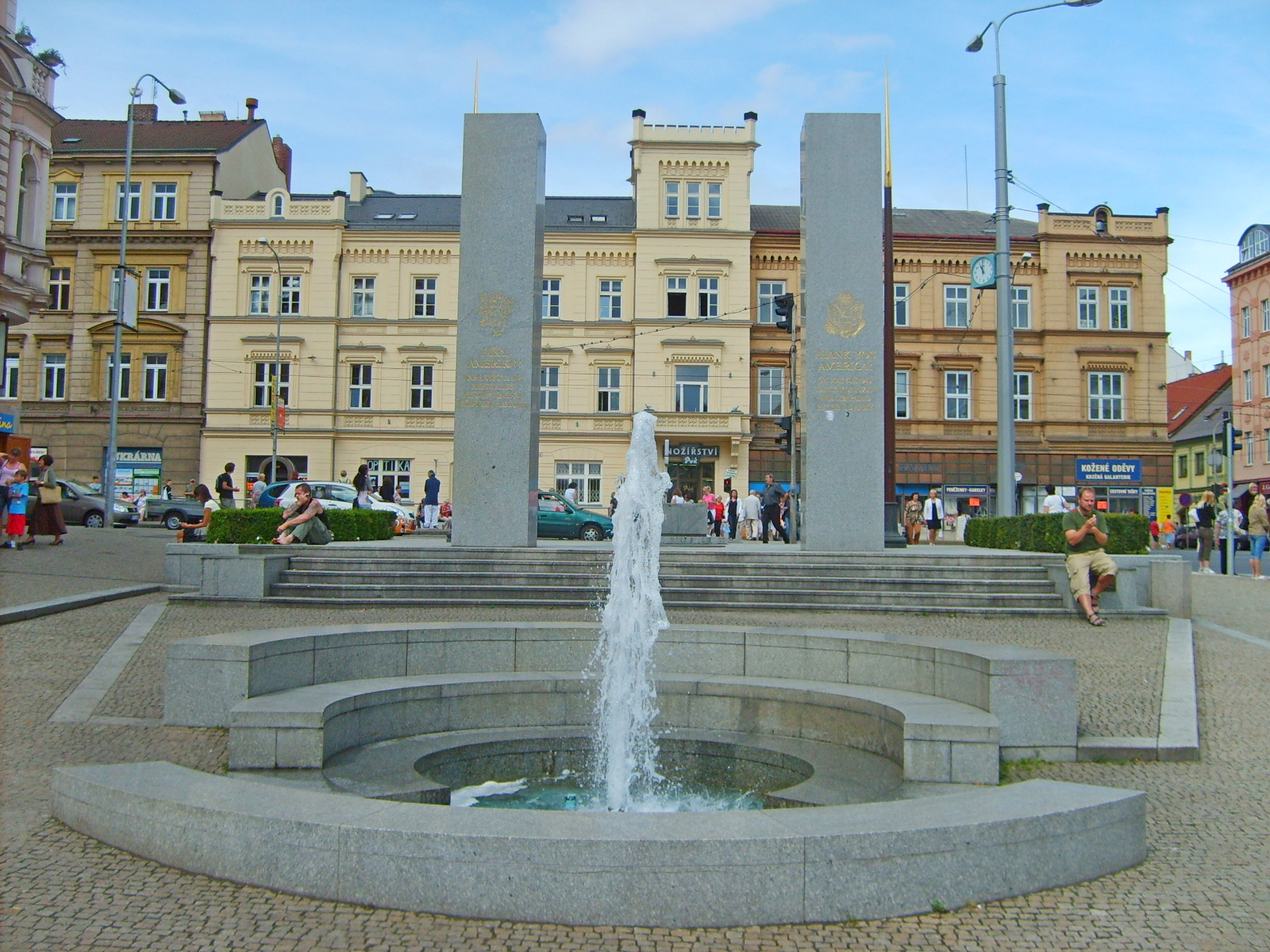
Memorial to the 16th Armored Division of the United States Army at the top of Americká, the main commercial boulevard

In April 1945, as World War II neared its end, Plzeň endured its most devastating air raids. On 17 April, British Royal Air Force bombers targeted the city's marshalling yard, aiming to disrupt German military logistics. The attack resulted in significant civilian casualties and widespread destruction of residential areas. Just days later, on 25 April, the U.S. Eighth Air Force launched a major bombing mission against the Škoda Works armament factory in Plzeň. This operation marked the last heavy bomber mission by the Eighth Air Force against an industrial target in Europe. The raids caused extensive damage to the city's infrastructure and left a lasting impact on its inhabitants. These attacks were part of the Allies' final efforts to cripple Nazi Germany's war capabilities.

On 6 May 1945, in the final days before the end of World War II in Europe, Plzeň was liberated from Nazi Germany by the 16th Armored Division of General George Patton's Third Army. Also participating in the liberation of the city were elements of the 97th and 2nd Infantry Divisions supported by the Polish Holy Cross Mountains Brigade. Other Third Army units liberated major portions of Western Bohemia. The rest of Czechoslovakia was liberated from German control by the Soviet Red Army. Elements of the 3rd Army, as well as units from the 1st Army, remained in Plzeň until late November 1945.

After the end of the war, the city's ethnic German minority population was expelled and their property was confiscated in accordance with the provisions of the Potsdam Agreement.

=== Communist era ===
After the 1948 Czechoslovak coup d'état, the government launched a currency reform in 1953, which caused a wave of discontent, including the Plzeň uprising. On 1 June 1953, over 20,000 people, mainly workers at the Škoda Works, began protesting against the government. Protesters forced their way into the town hall and threw communist symbols, furniture and other objects out of the windows. The protest caused a retaliation from the government, which included the destruction of the statue of Tomáš Garrigue Masaryk, the first president of Czechoslovakia. The statue has since been re-erected.

== Demographics ==
Historical population

Year	Pop.	±%
1869	31,436	—
1880	48,834	+55.3%
1890	64,158	+31.4%
1900	91,334	+42.4%
1910	112,008	+22.6%

Year	Pop.	±%
1921	122,354	+9.2%
1930	134,288	+9.8%
1950	127,447	−5.1%
1961	140,106	+9.9%
1970	153,524	+9.6%

Year	Pop.	±%
1980	171,599	+11.8%
1991	173,791	+1.3%
2001	166,118	−4.4%
2011	170,322	+2.5%
2021	174,007	+2.2%

Source: Censuses

== Economy ==
Plzeň is a centre of business in the western part of the Czech Republic. Plzeň produces about two-thirds of the Plzeň Region's GDP, even though it contains only 30% of its population. While part of this is explained by commuters to the city, it is one of the most prosperous cities in the Czech Republic.

Plzeň is the seat of many large corporations. The largest employers with their headquarters in Plzeň and at least 1,000 employees are:

Economic entity	Number of employees	Main activity
University Hospital Plzeň	5,000–9,999	Health care
University of West Bohemia	3,000–3,999	Education
Pilsner Urquell Brewery	2,500–2,999	Brewery
Škoda Transportation	2,500–2,999	Manufacture of railway vehicles
Regional Police Directorate of the Plzeň Region	2,500–2,999	Public administration
City of Plzeň	2,000–2,499	Public administration
Daikin Industries Czech Republic	1,500–1,999	Manufacture of air conditioning technology
Autoneum	1,000–1,499	Manufacture of textiles for the automotive industry
Doosan Škoda Power	1,000–1,499	Manufacture of steam turbines
HP-Pelzer	1,000–1,499	Automotive industry
JTEKT Czech Republic	1,000–1,499	Automotive industry
Lasselsberger	1,000–1,499	Manufacture of ceramic tiles
Plzeňské městské dopravní podniky	1,000–1,499	Urban and suburban passenger transport
Safran Cabin CZ	1,000–1,499	Manufacture of aircraft equipment
Škoda Electric	1,000–1,499	Manufacture of electric drives

The Škoda company, established in Plzeň in 1859, has been an important element of Austro-Hungarian, Czechoslovak and Czech engineering, and one of the biggest European arms factories. During the Communist era of the country (1948–1989), the company's production had been directed to the needs of the Eastern Bloc. Disarray in the era after the Velvet Revolution, and unsuccessful efforts to gain new Western markets, resulted in sales problems and debts. After a huge restructuring process, the company was divided into several subsidiaries, which were later sold. The most important successor companies are Škoda Transportation and Doosan Škoda Power.

The Stock company, located in the Božkov district, is the largest producer of liquors in the Czech Republic. Fernet Stock has long been the best-selling herbal liqueur on the Czech market.

Since the late 1990s, the city has experienced high growth in foreign investment. In 2007, Israeli mall developer Plaza Centers opened the Plzeň Plaza, a 20,000 m^{2} (220,000 sq ft) shopping mall and entertainment centre featuring a multiplex cinema from Cinema City Czech Republic.

In the 2025 Numbeo Quality of Life Index, Plzeň achieved the highest ranking of all Czech cities evaluated. However, in the 2025 national Quality of Life Index, the city ranked only 61st out of 206.

The Plzeň agglomeration was defined as a tool for drawing money from the European Structural and Investment Funds. It is an area that includes the city and its surroundings, linked to the city by commuting and migration. It has about 328,000 inhabitants.

=== Pilsner beer ===
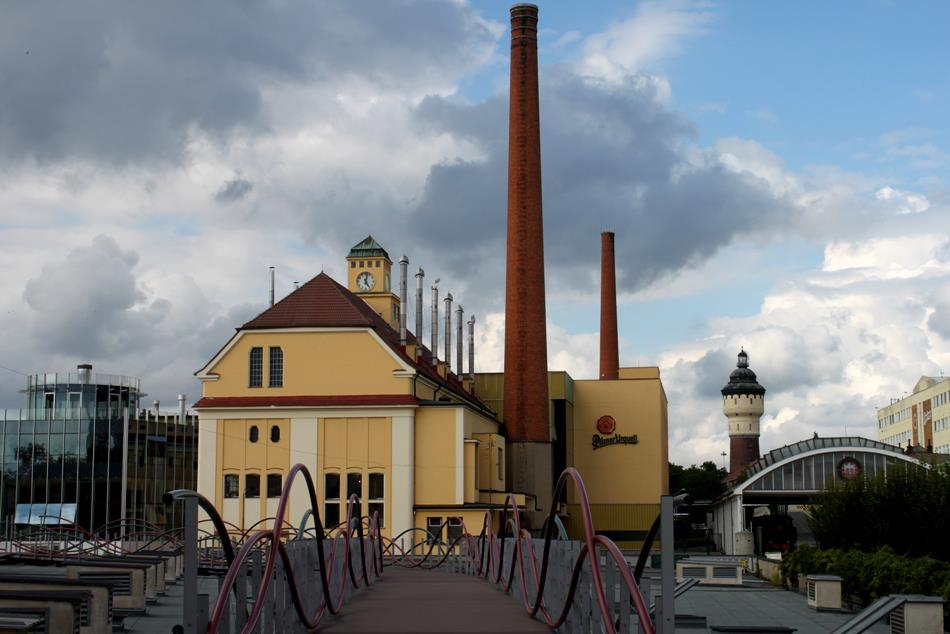
Traditional fermenting building (centre) and modern fermenting building (left)

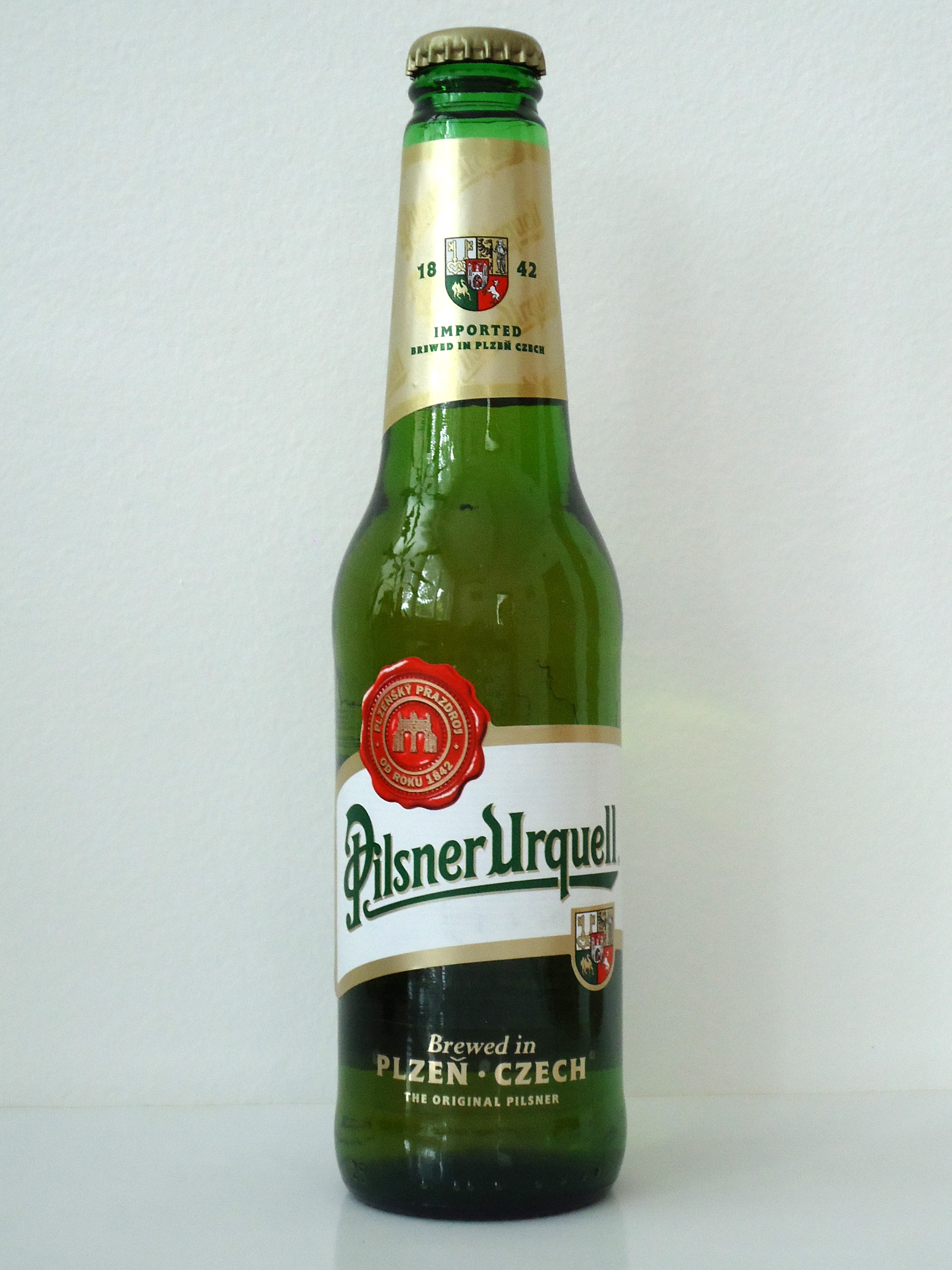
Pilsner Urquell

Plzeň is well known for the Pilsner Urquell (since 1842) and Gambrinus (since 1869) breweries, currently owned by Asahi Group Holdings.

Plzeň is an important city in the history of beer, including the development of Pilsner. In 1375, Bohemian King Charles IV endowed the Dobrow Monastery near Plzeň with the beer right, and it is one of the oldest breweries to survive to modern times. Many breweries were located in the interconnected deep cellars of the city.

The officials of Plzeň founded a city-owned brewery in 1839, Bürger Brauerei (Citizens' Brewery, now Plzeňský Prazdroj), and recruited Bavarian brewer Josef Groll (1813–1887) who produced the first batch of modern Pilsner beer on 5 October 1842. This included mastering the art of triple decoction mashing. The combination of pale colour from the new malts, Plzeň's remarkably soft water, Saaz noble hops from nearby Žatec (Saaz in German) and Bavarian-style lagering produced a clear, golden beer which was regarded as a sensation. Improving transport meant that this new beer was soon available throughout Central Europe, and Pilsner Brauart-style brewing was widely imitated.

In 1859, "Pilsner Bier" was registered as a brand name at the Chamber of Commerce and Trade in Plzeň. In 1898, the Pilsner Urquell trade mark was created to emphasize this being the brewery where the beer style originated.

== Transport ==
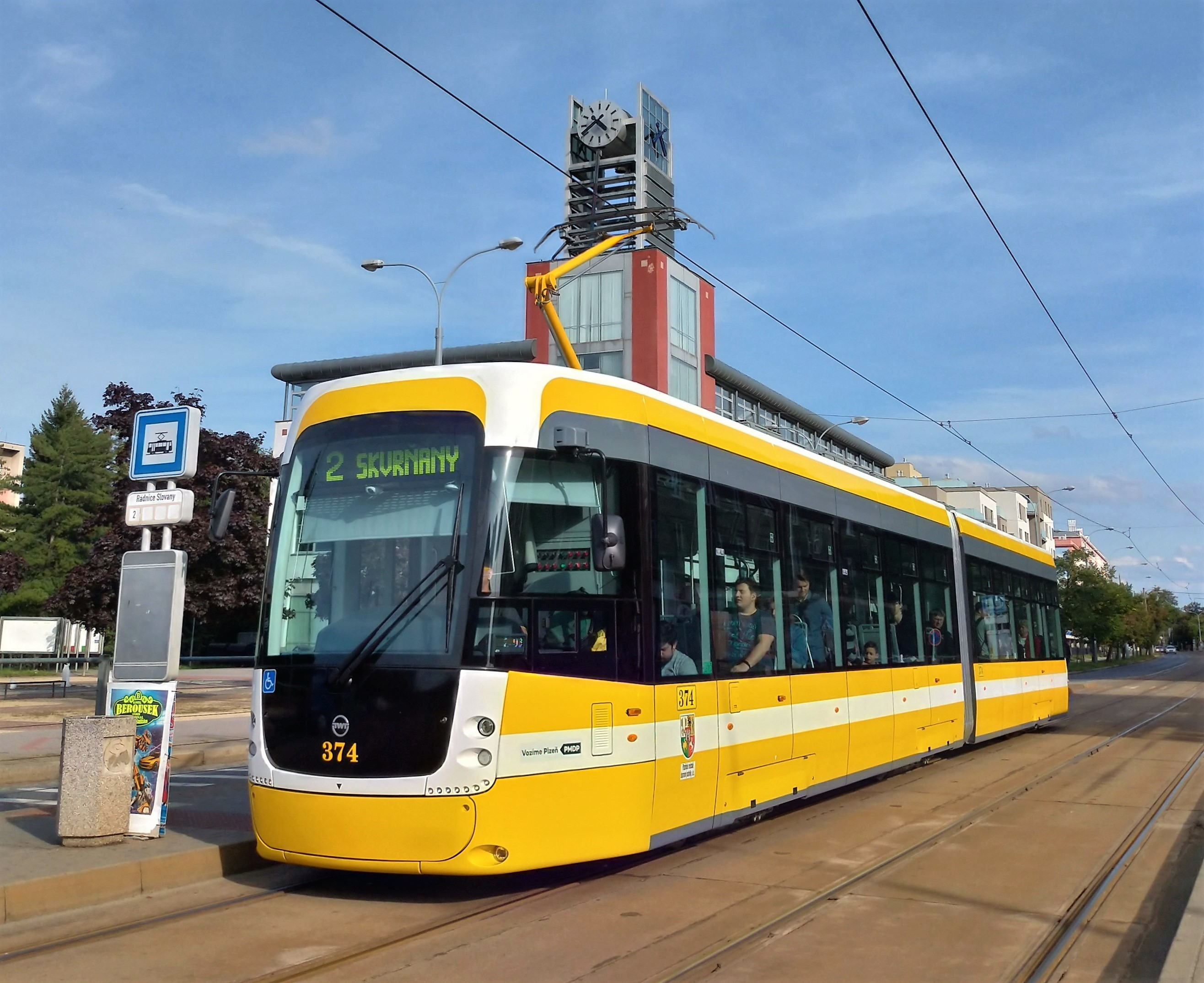
EVO2 tram in Plzeň

=== Trams, trolleybuses and buses ===
The Plzeň metropolitan area is largely served by a network of trams, trolleybuses and buses operated by the PMDP. Like other continental European cities, tickets bought from vending machines or small shops are valid for any transport run by the city of Plzeň. For residents of the city, a Plzeň Card can be purchased and, through a system of "topping up" be used on any public transport with no limitations, as long as it is paid up and valid. Tickets can be purchased in vehicles with a contactless smart card.

=== Rail ===
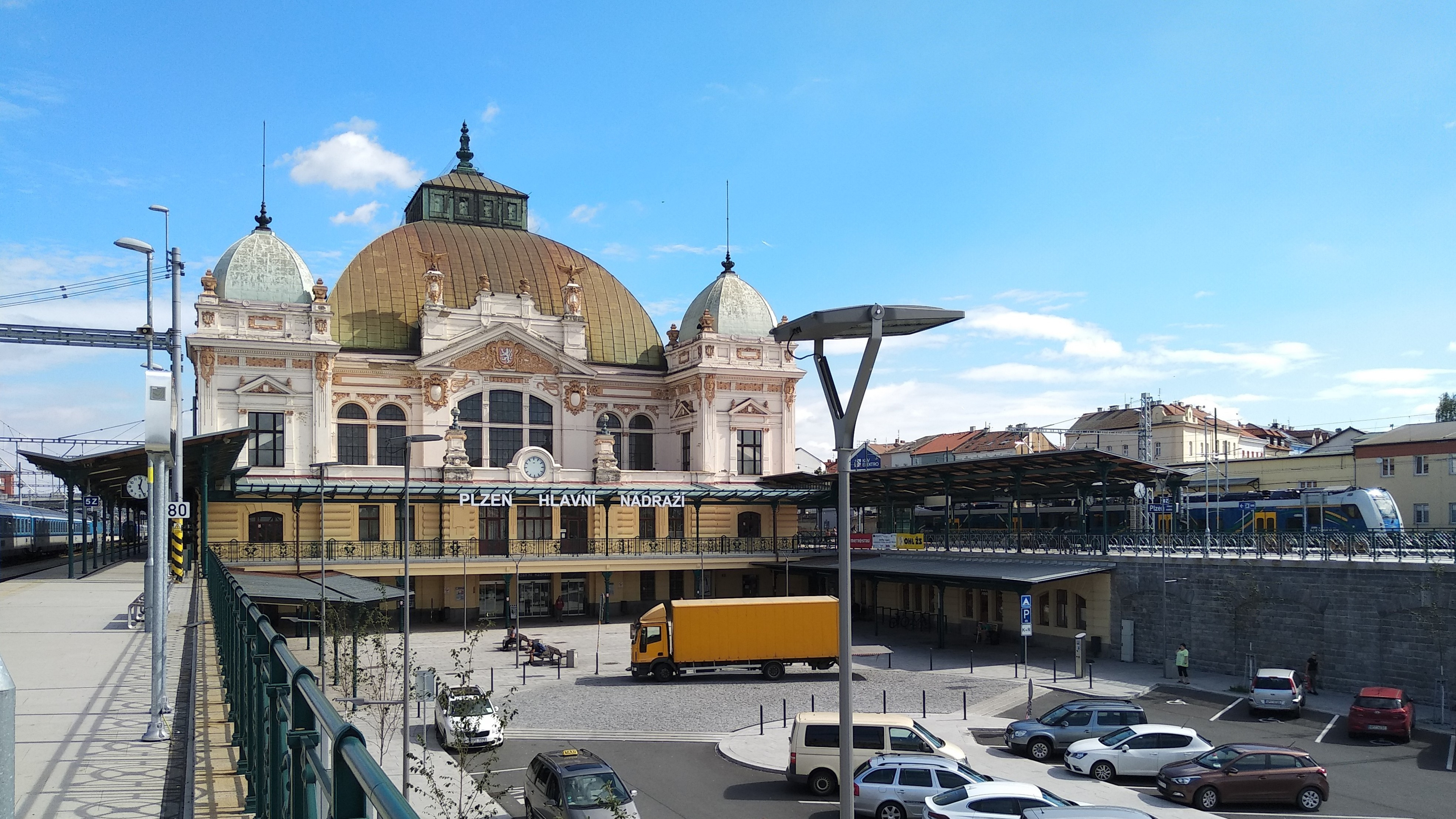
Plzeň hlavní nádraží, main railway station

The main railway station, Plzeň hlavní nádraží, is an important centre of Czech railway transport, with the crossing of five main railway lines:

- line No. 170: Prague – Beroun – Plzeň – Cheb
- line No. 180: Plzeň – Domažlice – Furth im Wald (Germany)
- line No. 183: Plzeň – Klatovy – Železná Ruda
- line No. 160: Plzeň – Žatec
- line No. 190: Plzeň – České Budějovice

=== Road ===
The most important transport link in the city is the D5 highway connecting Prague and Nuremberg.

=== Air ===
Plzeň is served by the Plzeň Líně Airport, which is a public domestic and private international airport. It is located southwest of Plzeň, just outside of the territory of Plzeň and named after the municipality of Líně. Václav Havel Airport Prague, is also located 89 km (55 mi) which is an hour drive north east of Plzeň.

== Religion ==
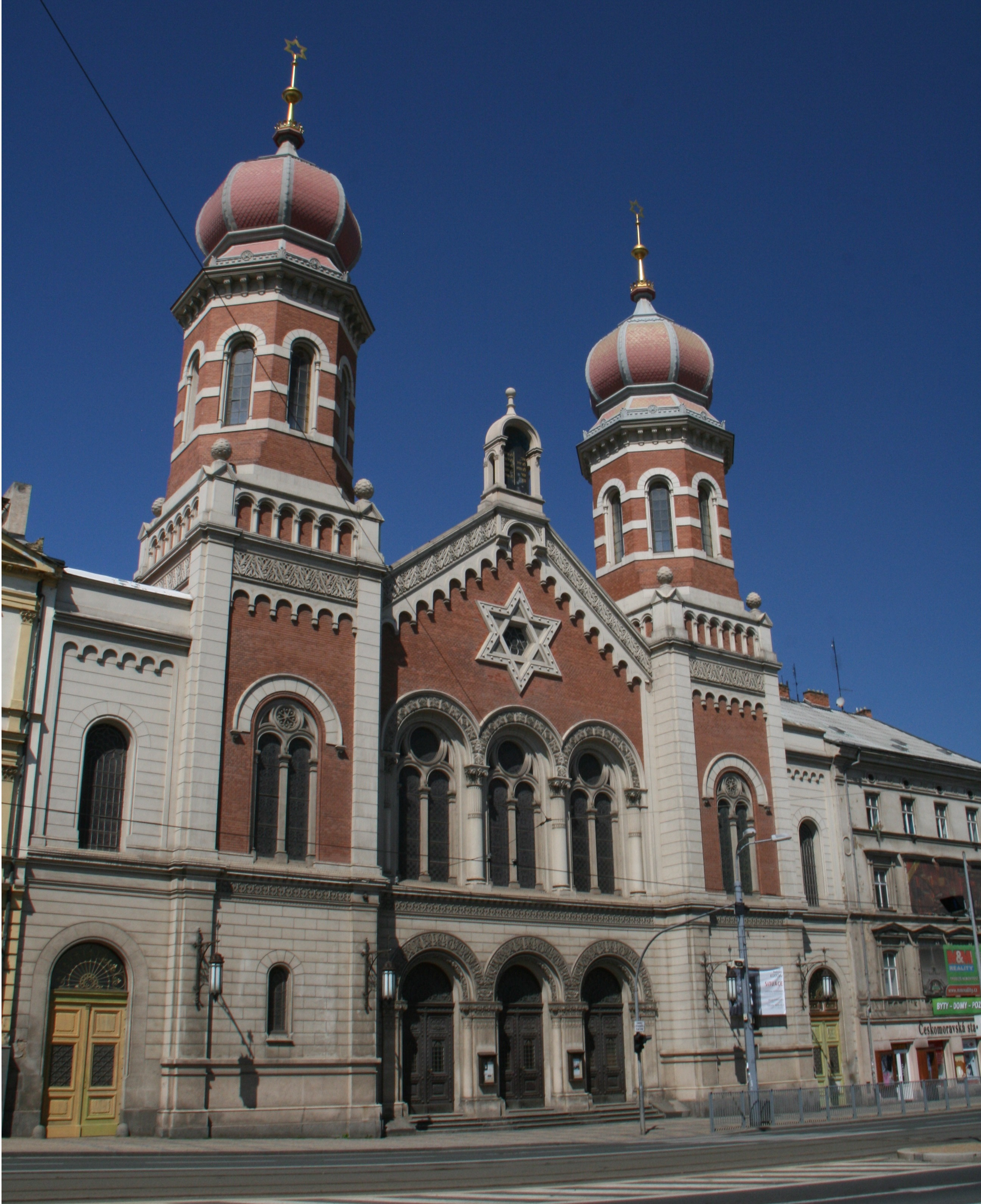
Great Synagogue in Plzeň

Since 31 May 1993, Plzeň has been the seat of the Roman Catholic Diocese of Plzeň. The first bishop (current bishop emeritus) was František Radkovský. The current bishop is Tomáš Holub. The diocese covers an area with a total of 818,700 inhabitants. The diocesan see is in St. Bartholomew's Cathedral on Republiky Square in Plzeň. The diocese is divided into 10 vicariates with a total of 72 parishes.

The seat of the West Bohemian seniorate (literary presbytery; Central European protestant equivalent of a diocese) of Evangelical Church of Czech Brethren is currently set in Plzeň. There are two other parish congregations of the Evangelical Church of Czech Brethren in the Plzeň-City District – The Western congregation of the Evangelical Church of Czech Brethren in Plzeň, known as The Western congregation, located in the Western part of the city in the borough of Jižní předměstí, and The Congregation of the Evangelical Church of Czech Brethren in Chrást, located in Chrást in the very east of Plzeň-City District.

The seat of the Plzeň diocese of the Czechoslovak Hussite Church is located in Plzeň (although the bishop has resided in Mirovice for several years due to a reconstruction of the episcopacy). The current bishop is Filip Štojdl.

The Czech Evangelical Lutheran Church is headquartered in Plzeň. St. Paul's Lutheran Church is a church of the Czech Evangelical Lutheran Church in Plzeň.

The other churches also present in Plzeň are the Evangelical Church of the Augsburg Confession in the Czech Republic, the United Methodist Church, the Seventh-day Adventist Church, the Church of Brethren, the Orthodox Church of the Czech Lands and Slovakia, the Greek Catholic Church, and others.

== Education ==
The University of West Bohemia was founded in Plzeň 1991. It comprises nine faculties and has approximately 12,000 students.

The Faculty of Medicine in Pilsen, Charles University (Czech: Lékařská fakulta v Plzni Univerzity Karlovy) is one of the five medical faculties of Charles University. It has about 2,000 students.

Martin Luther Primary School (Základní škola Martina Luthera) is a private Christian school of the Czech Evangelical Lutheran Church in Plzeň.

== Culture ==
Plzeň was a European Capital of Culture in 2015, along with Mons in Belgium.

== Sport ==
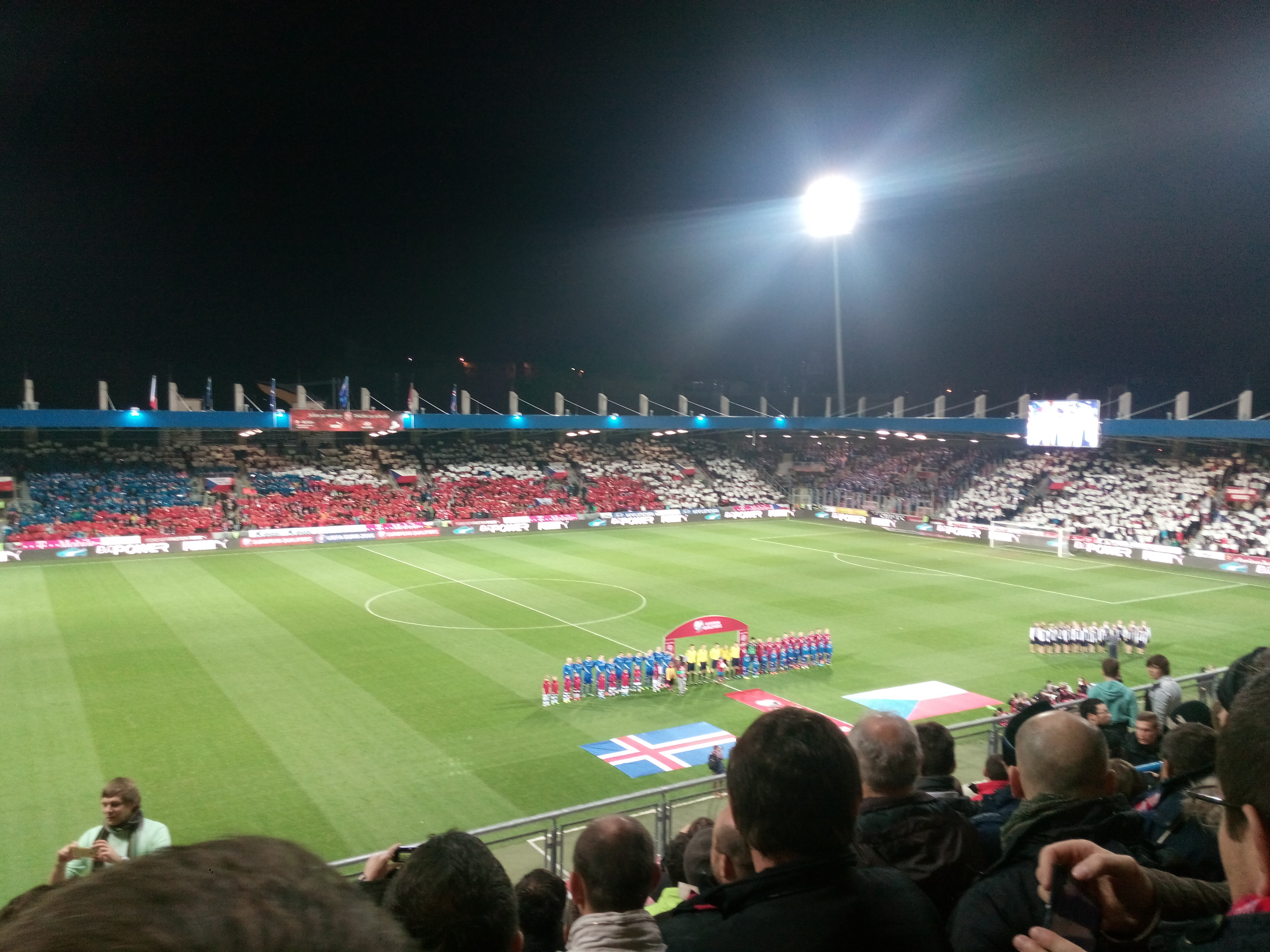
Doosan Arena

The ice hockey club HC Škoda Plzeň plays in the Czech Extraliga. The team plays its home games at Logspeed CZ Aréna. The football club FC Viktoria Plzeň plays in the Czech First League and belongs among the most successful clubs in the Czech Republic. Viktoria Plzeň has played in the UEFA Champions League and UEFA Europa League. The team plays its home games at Doosan Arena. Handball club Talent Plzeň plays in the Czech Handball Extraliga.

The motorcycle speedway team PK Plzeň races at the Plzeň speedway track. The track has hosted significant speedway events including qualifying rounds of the Speedway World Team Cup.

== Sights ==
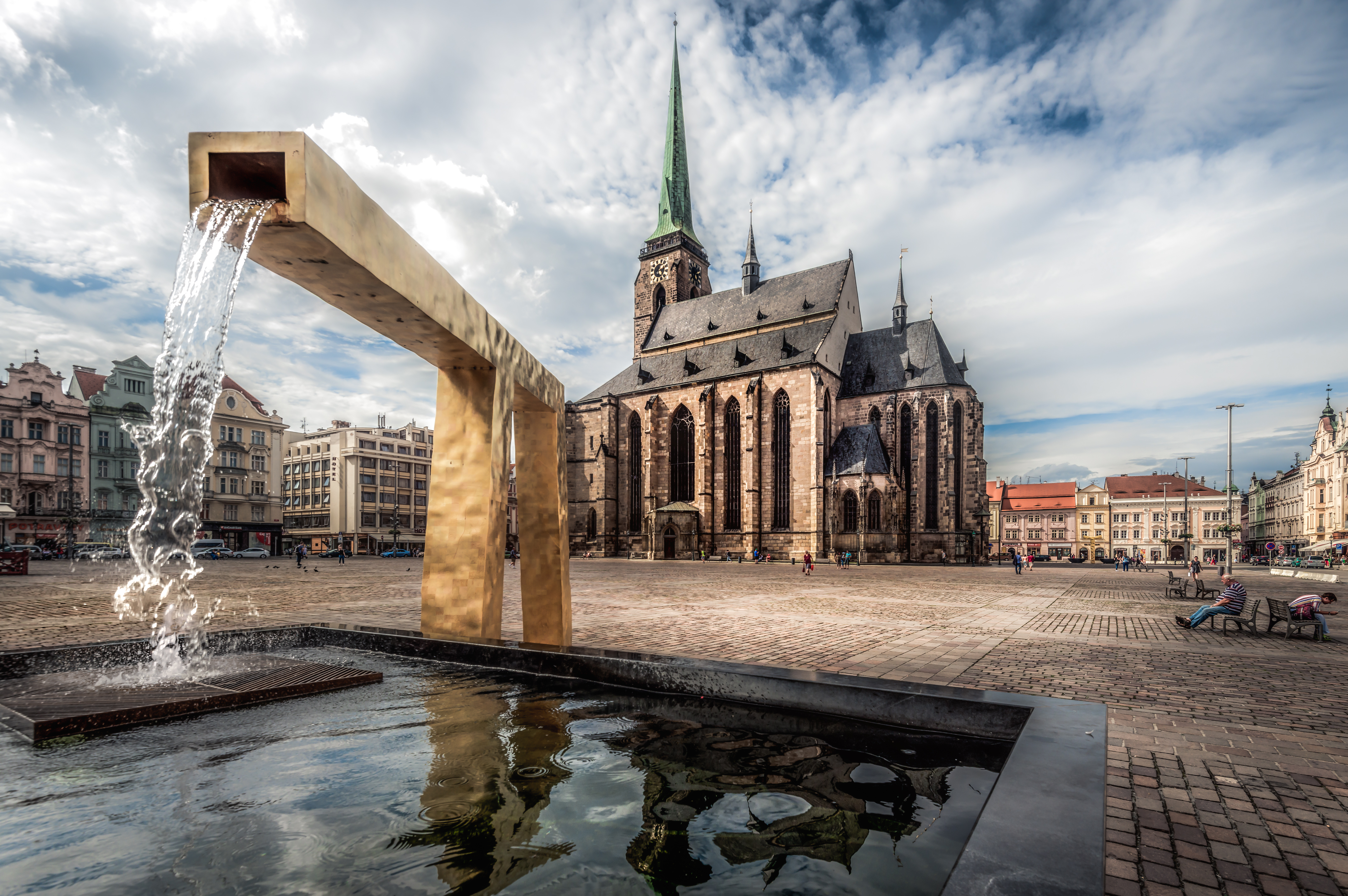
Náměstí Republiky with the Cathedral of St. Bartholomew

=== Historic city centre ===
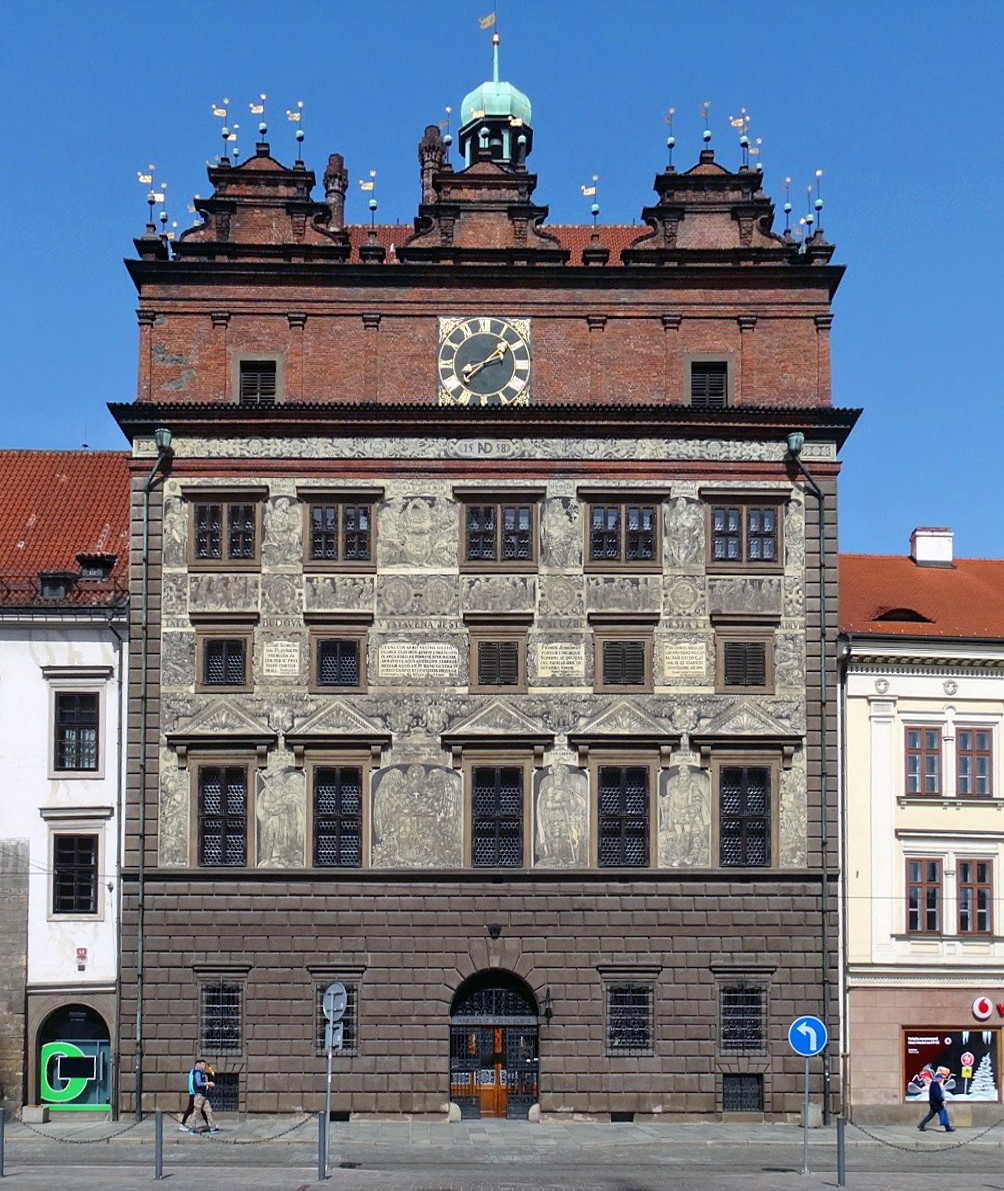
City Hall

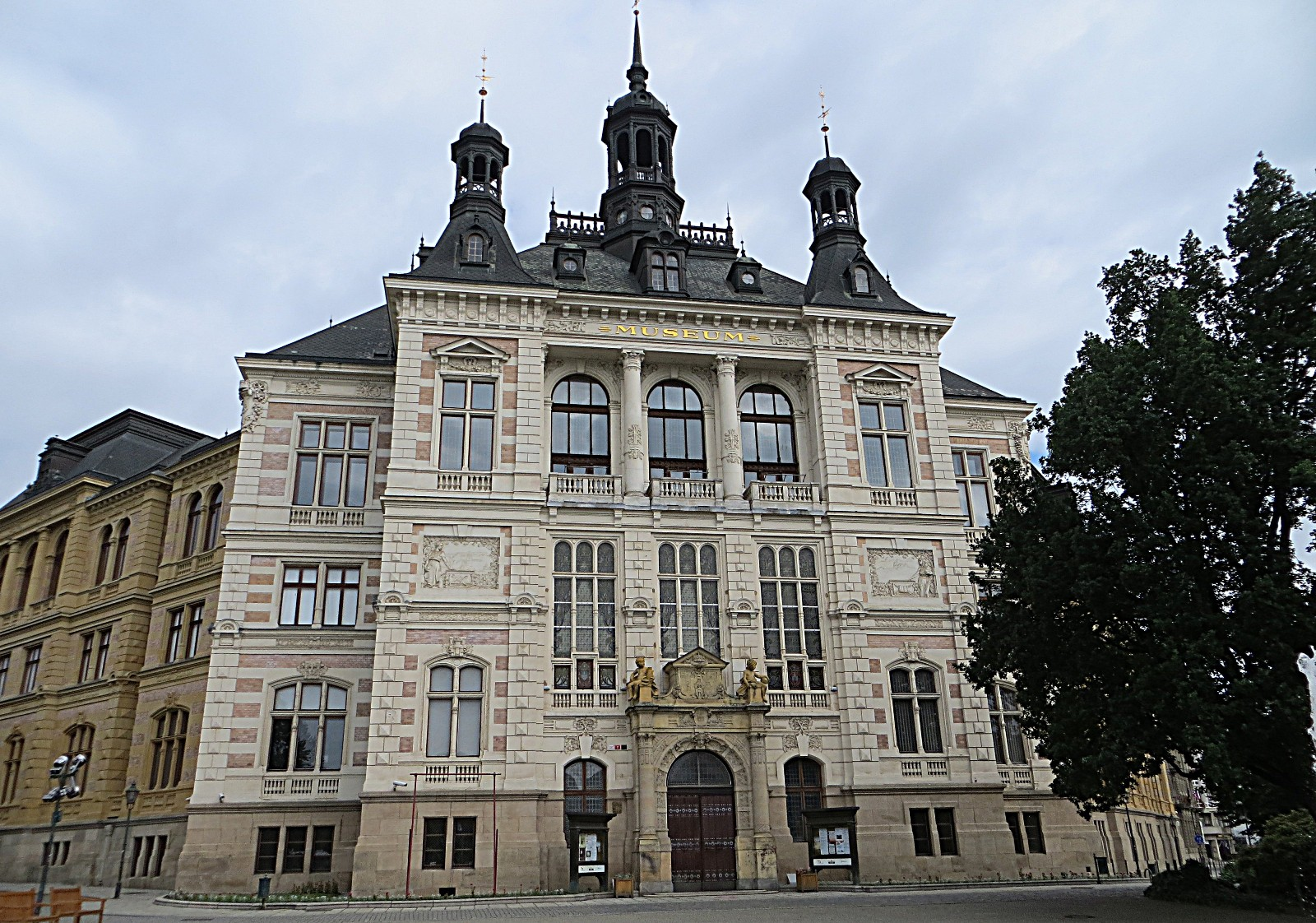
West Bohemian Museum in Plzeň

The historic centre of Plzeň, which is formed by the Náměstí Republiky square and adjacent streets, has been protected as an urban monument reservation since 1989. The most prominent landmark of Plzeň is the Cathedral of St. Bartholomew, built in the Gothic style in the late 13th century. It is protected as a national cultural monument. Its tower is the highest in the Czech Republic at 102.6 m (337 ft). The interior contains hundreds of works of art, the most valuable of which is the statue called the Plzeň Madonna. It is one of the most valuable Gothic monuments in the Czech Republic.

Other notable sight at the square is the City Hall, also protected as a national cultural monument. This Renaissance monument was built in 1554–1559 by the Italian architect Giovanni de Statia, on the site of two late Gothic houses, whose fragments have survived to this day. In 1907–1912, it was reconstructed in the Neo-Renaissance style and decorated with sgraffiti. The plague column on the square near the City Hall is the work of local sculptor Kristian Widman and dates back to 1681.

The Franciscan Monastery is a Gothic structure from the 14th century. The monastery complex includes the Church of the Assumption of the Virgin Mary, Chapel of Saint Barbara and Chapterhouse. The main building houses the Museum of Ecclesiastical Art of the Diocese of Plzeň. Next to the monastery is the main building of the West Bohemian Museum in Plzeň. The museum was founded in 1878 and, in terms of the scope of its collections, it is one of the largest museum institutions in the Czech Republic. The West Bohemian Museum in Plzeň is the administrator of several other museums in the region, including the museum in the Franciscan Monastery.

Among the oldest monuments in the city centre are the remains of the Gothic city fortifications. They date from the second quarter of the 14th century and a late Gothic reconstruction took place during the 15th century. In 1618–1659, modern Baroque bastion fortification was made. Most of the walls were demolished, but a few fragments survive, often as part of new townhouses.

Beneath the historic city centre is an underground labyrinth of tunnels and cellars. With a total length of 20 km (12 mi), it is the third largest such labyrinth in the country. The corridors were gradually built since the 13th century. Almost 800 m (2,600 ft) of the corridors are open to the public. The entrance to the labyrinth is from the Brewing Museum.

=== Jewish monuments ===
The Great Synagogue is the second largest synagogue in Europe (after the Dohány Street Synagogue in Budapest). It is situated just outside the urban monument reservation. It was constructed in 1892–1893 and is an example of the Neo-Renaissance architecture. It is used both for religious services and for organising cultural events for the public.

The Old Synagogue was built in the Neo-Renaissance in 1875. It was built next to the Jewish school (1857–1859). Today, the synagogue is occasionally used for cultural events and the Jewish school serves as a museum in memory of the deported Jews of Plzeň.

=== Popular tourist destinations ===
A popular tourist attraction is the Plzeňský Prazdroj brewery tour, where visitors can discover the history and process of beer brewing in Plzeň. The tour also includes historic cellars. A notable landmark and technical monument in the premises of the brewery is the historic water tower. It was built in 1905–1907 and its visit is part of the brewing tour.

In 2024, the Plzeňský Prazdroj brewery was the most visited tourist destination in the Plzeň Region and the 12th most visited tourist destination in the country. Other popular tourist destinations in the city include Plzeň Zoo and Botanical Garden, DinoPark Plzeň (amusement park with moving dinosaur models), and Techmania Science Center.

=== Suburbs ===
The centres of Božkov, Černice and Koterov, which were once separate municipalities, have a well-preserved historic character and folk architecture, and are protected as three village monument reservations.

The last of the three national cultural monuments in Plzeň is the Bolevec Homestead, located in Plzeň-Bolevec. The reason for the protection of this Neoclassical rural homestead is its exceptional state of preservation. It is a notable example of the development of rural folk architecture in the Plzeň Region in the 18th–20th centuries. The homestead was first documented on maps in 1781, but it is certain that it has medieval origins. Today it houses an open-air museum.

The Church of All Saints is located in Plzeň-Severní Předměstí. It was built in the Gothic style in the 1380s, on the site of an old Romanesque church. The extensive and well-preserved Renaissance interior painting is valuable, as is the cemetery next to the church with many well-preserved old tombstones. The cemetery was abolished in 1901.

== Notable people ==
- Emil von Škoda (1839–1900), engineer and industrialist
- Josef Finger (1841–1925), physicist and mathematician
- Emma B. Mandl (1842–1928), Chicago charities founder
- Friedrich Goldscheider (1845–1897), ceramist and industrialist
- František Křižík (1847–1941), inventor
- Augustin Němejc (1861–1938), painter
- Rudolf Karel (1880–1945), composer
- Emil Lederer (1882–1939), economist and sociologist
- Růžena Šlemrová (1886–1962), actress
- Josef Beran (1888–1969), cardinal, Czech primate, archbishop of Prague
- Josef Skupa (1892–1957), puppeteer
- Jaroslav Vogel (1894–1970), conductor and composer
- Ladislav Sutnar (1897–1976), graphic designer, pioneer of information design and information architecture
- Jaroslav Černý (1898–1970), Oxford professor and Egyptologist
- Siegfried Lederer (1904–1972), Auschwitz escapee
- Jiří Trnka (1912–1969), artist
- Miroslav Štandera (1918–2014), fighter pilot
- Ota Šik (1919–2004), economist
- Karel Černý (1922–2014), art director
- Miroslav Holub (1923–1998), poet
- Josef Rösch (1925–2016), interventional radiologist
- Kurt Dietmar Richter (1931−2019), German composer and conductor
- Karla Erbová (1933–2024), poet, prose writer and journalist
- Gabriela Basařová (1934–2019), chemist
- Peter Grünberg (1939–2018), German physicist
- Karel Gott (1939–2019), singer
- Vaclav Smil (born 1943), Czech-Canadian scientist
- Jaroslav Beneš (born 1946), fine art photographer
- Tomáš Šmíd (born 1956), tennis player
- Vítězslav Lavička (born 1963), football manager
- Tomáš Cihlář (born 1967), chemist and virologist
- David Kotyza (born 1967), tennis coach
- Martin Straka (born 1972), ice hockey player
- Luboš Motl (born 1973), physicist
- Jiří Mužík (born 1976), track and field athlete
- Petr Sýkora (born 1976), ice hockey player
- Milan Kraft (born 1980), ice hockey player
- Petr Čech (born 1982), football player
- Kateřina Emmons (born 1983), sport shooter, Olympic medalist
- David Limberský (born 1983), footballer
- Pavel Samiec (born 1984), composer and accordionist
- Andrea Hlaváčková (born 1986), tennis player
- Barbora Strýcová (born 1986), tennis player
- Vladimír Darida (born 1990), footballer
- Andrej Šustr (born 1990), ice hockey player
- Pavel Francouz (born 1990), ice hockey player
- Dominik Kubalík (born 1995), ice hockey player
- Barbora Votíková (born 1996), footballer
- Lukáš Provod (born 1996), footballer
- Robin Hranáč (born 2000), footballer

== Twin towns – sister cities ==
Plzeň is twinned with:

- Birmingham, United States
- Liège, Belgium
- Limoges, France
- Regensburg, Germany
- Takasaki, Japan
- Winterthur, Switzerland
- Žilina, Slovakia

== Gallery ==
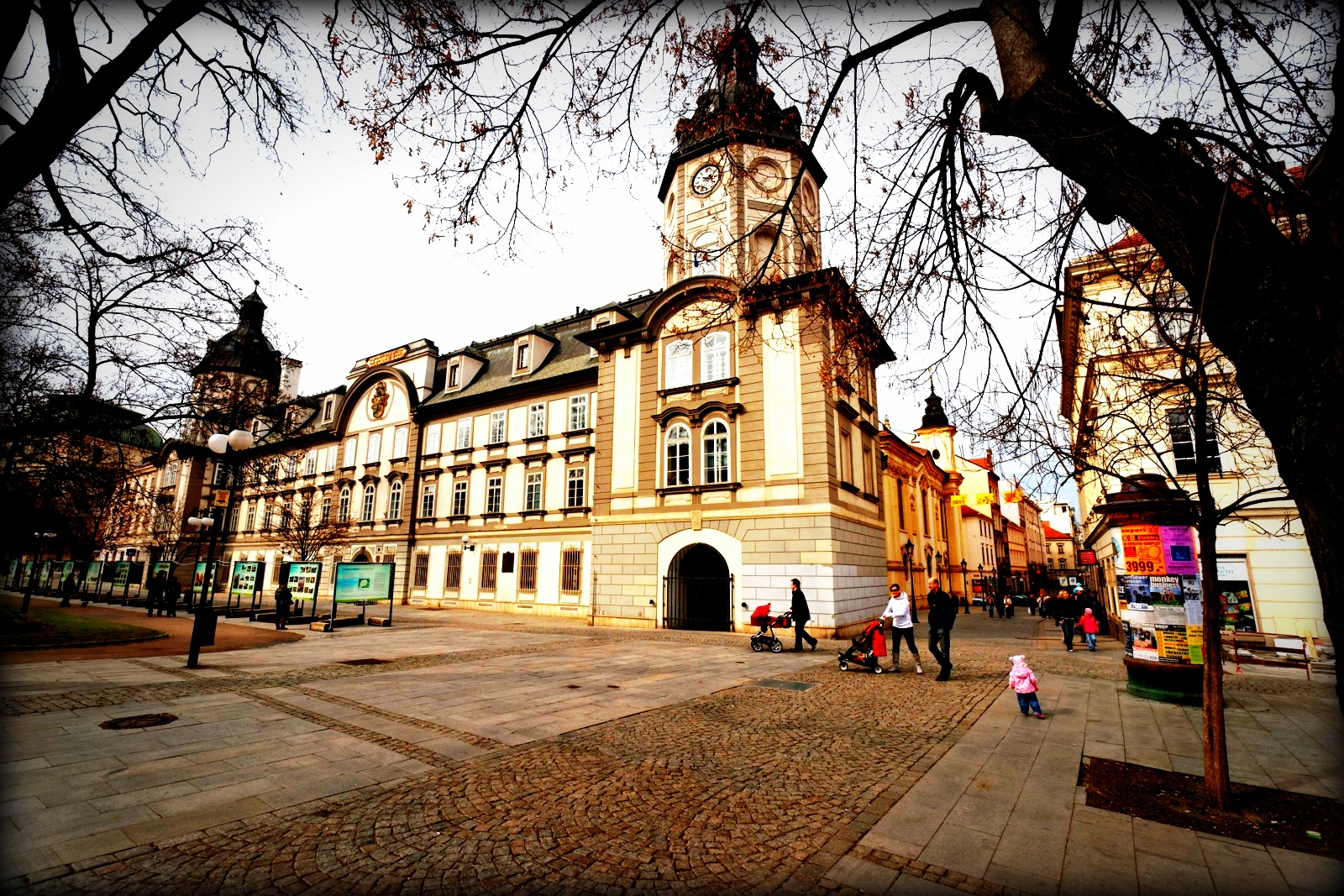
Research Library

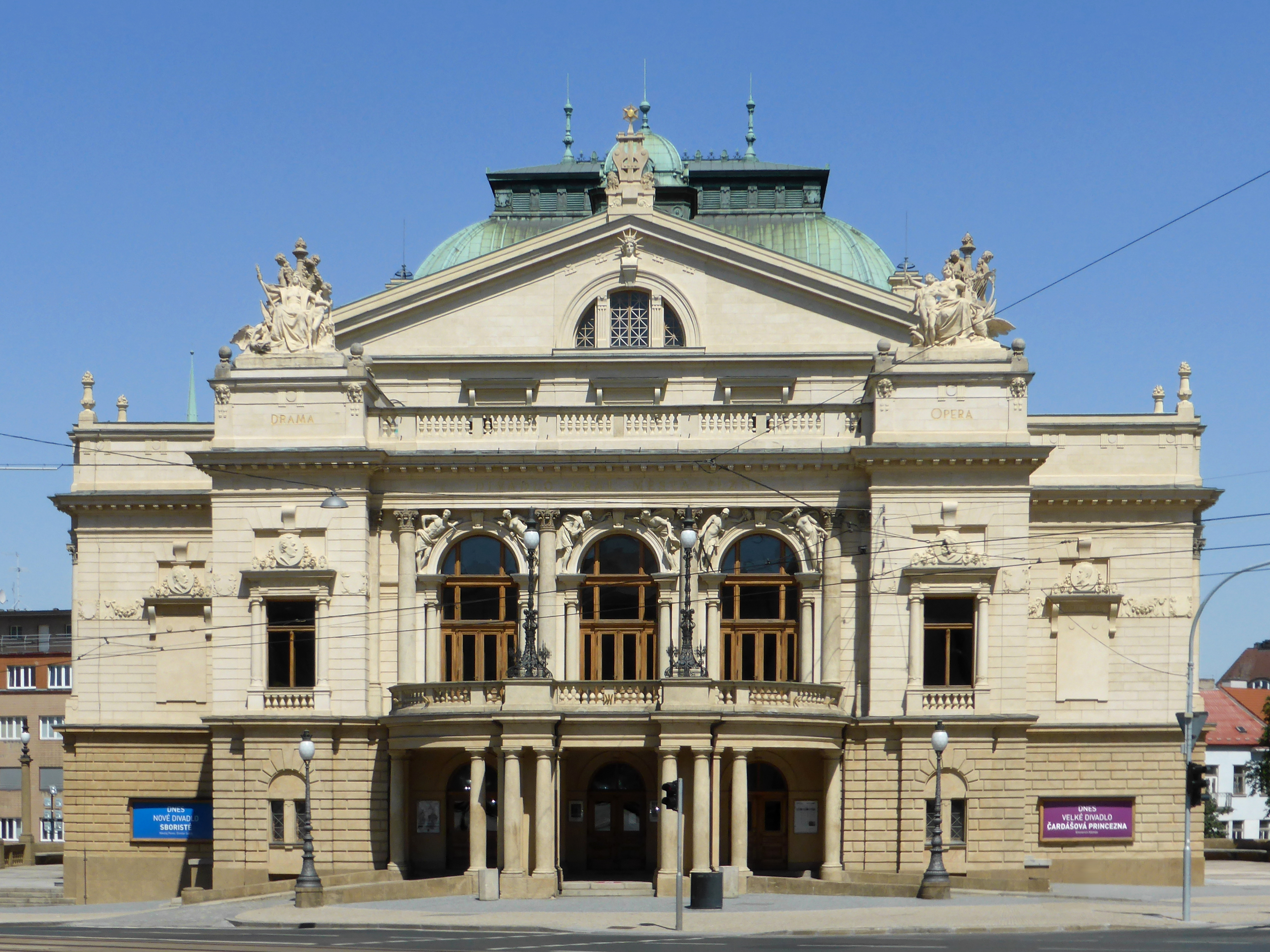
Josef Kajetán Tyl Theatre

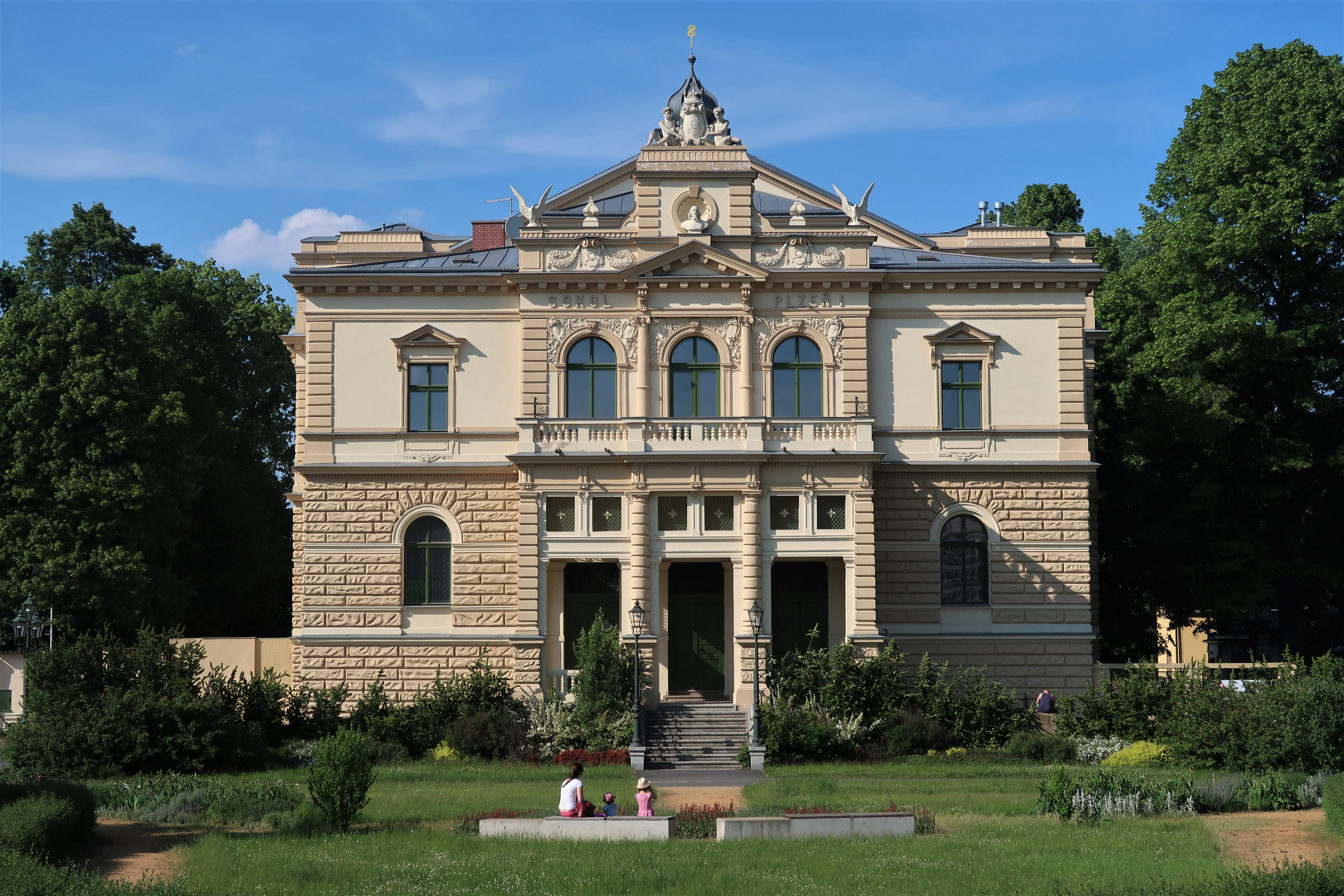
Sokol Hall

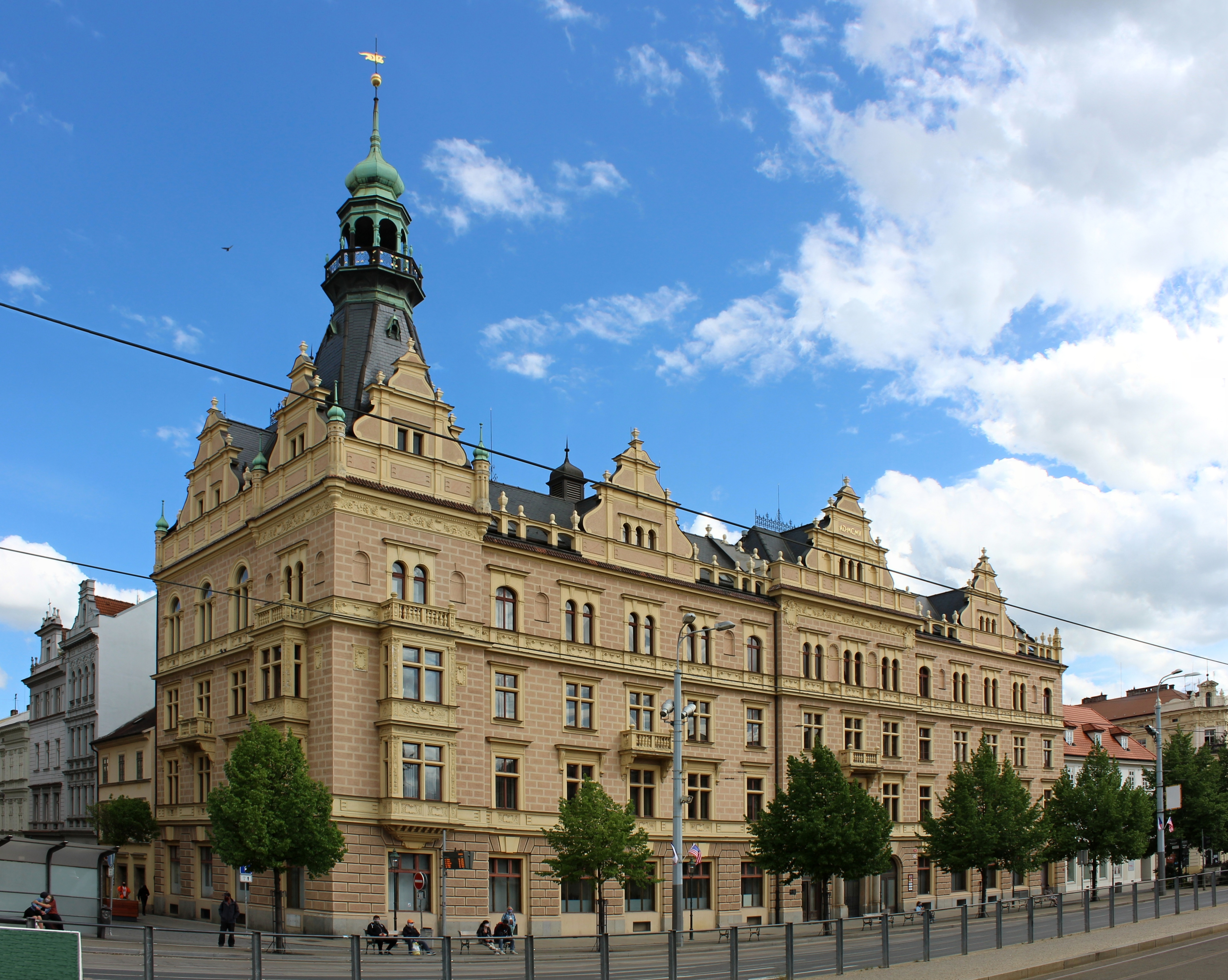
Faculty of Law of the University of West Bohemia

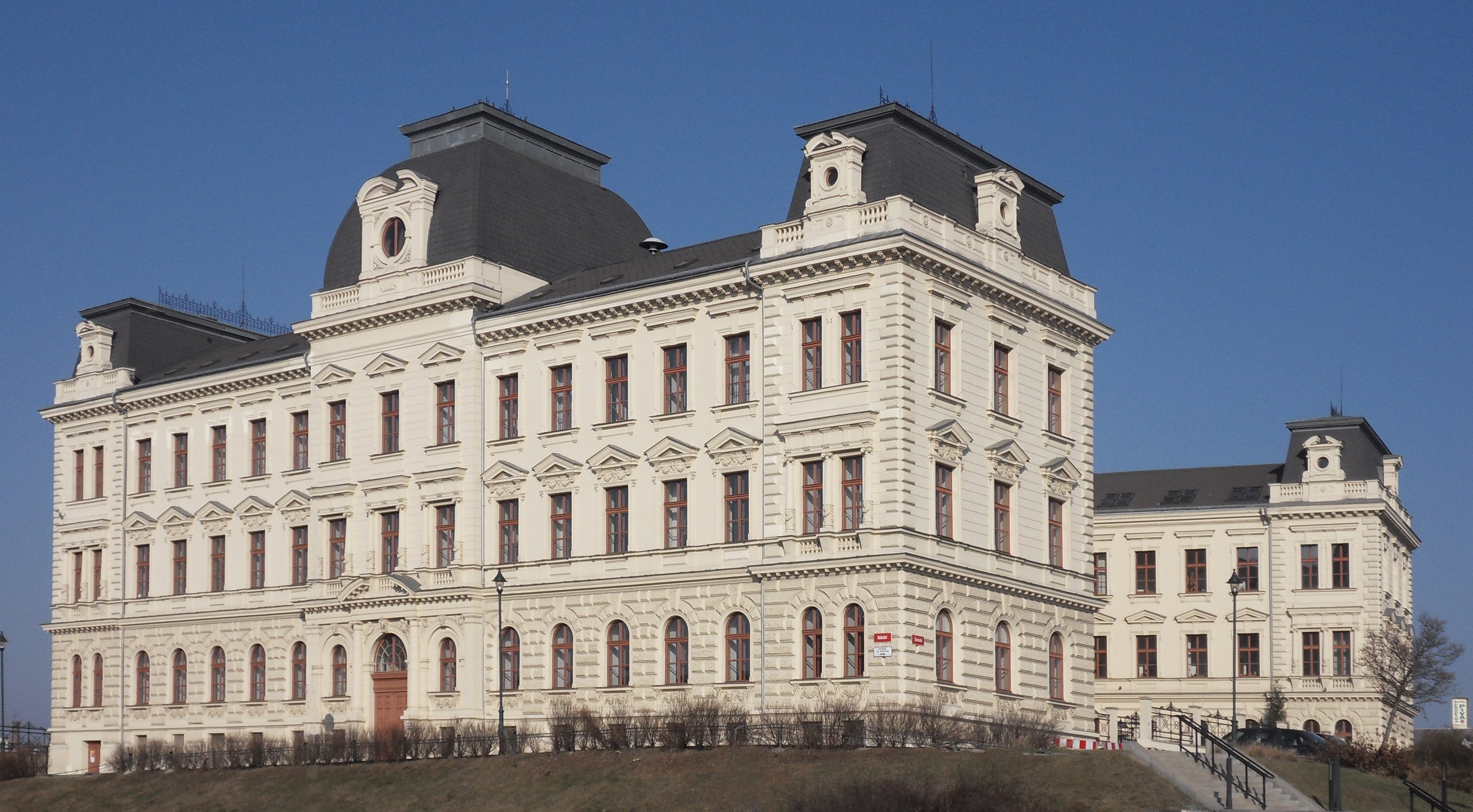
District Court

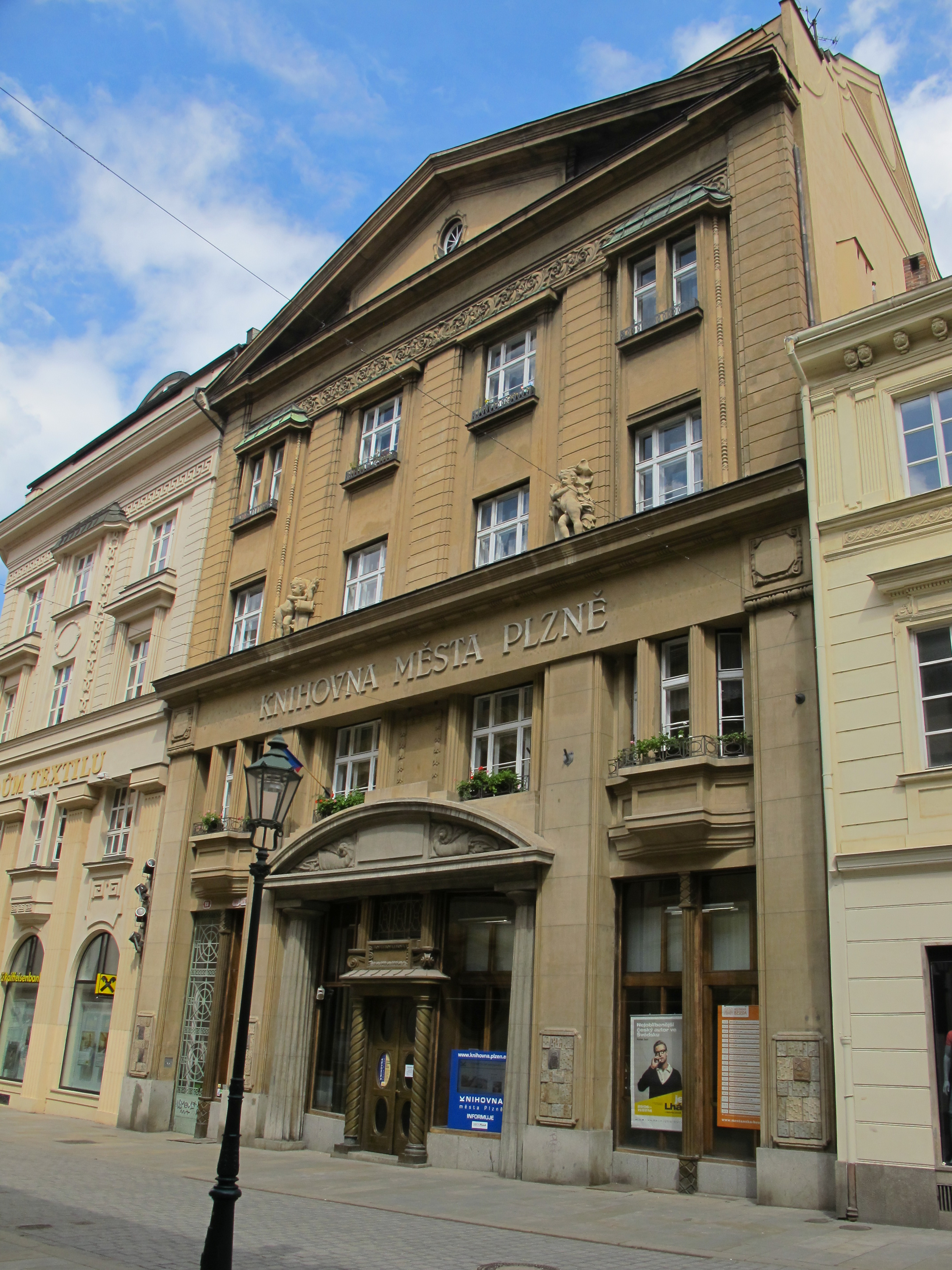
Municipal Library
