= Church of All Saints (Plzeň) =

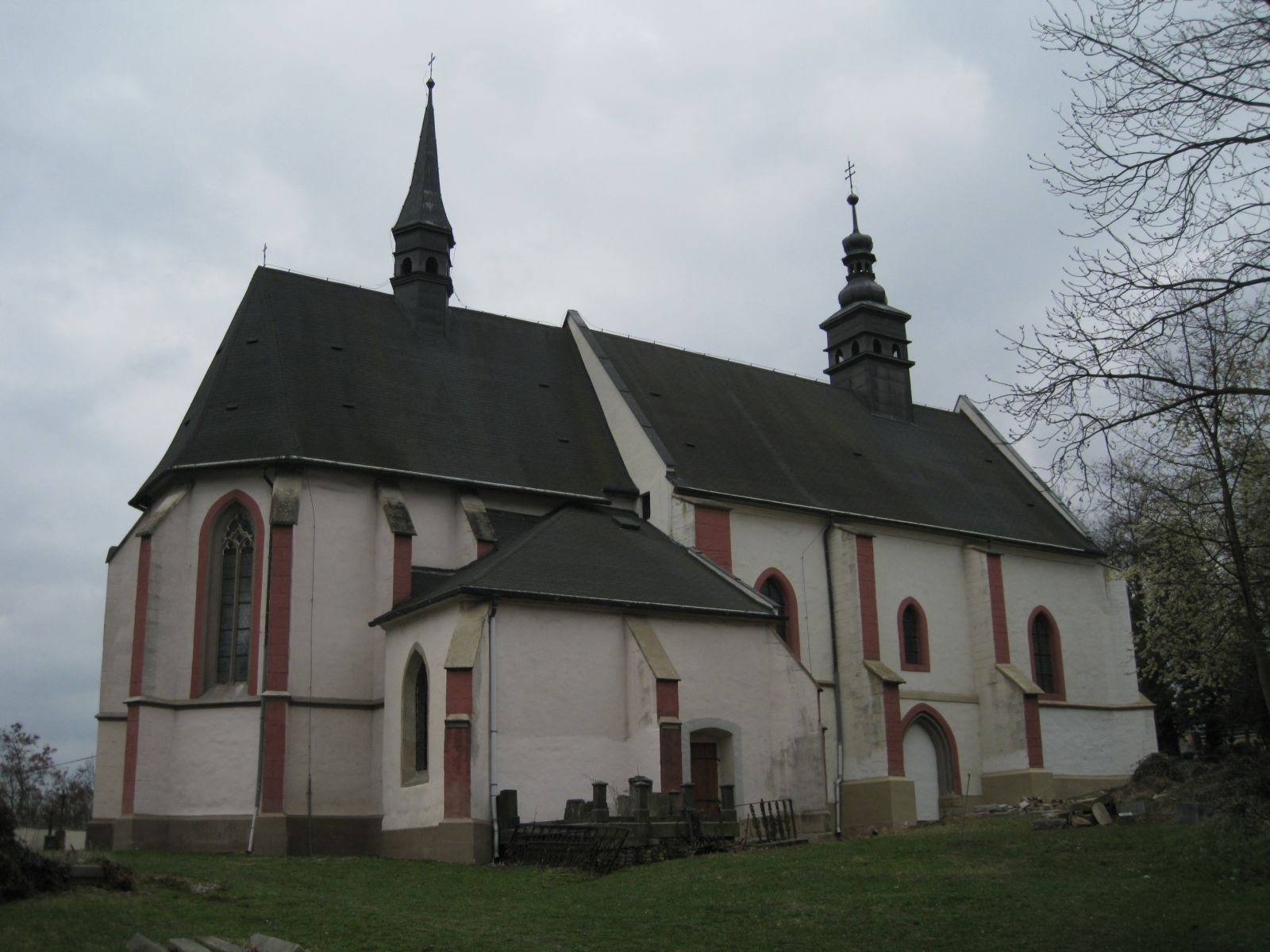
- Northern façade

- Location in the Czech Republic
- 49°45′30″N 13°22′46″E
- Location: Plzeň
- Country: Czech Republic
- Denomination: Roman Catholic
- Website: http://frantiskani-plzen.farnost.cz/

History
- Status: active
- Consecrated: 17 May 1995

Architecture
- Functional status: filial church
- Architectural type: one nave Church
- Style: Romanesque, Gothic, Baroque
- Completed: 13th century

Specifications
- Length: 33.75 m (110.7 ft)
- Width: 18.75 m (61.5 ft)

Administration
- Diocese: Plzeň

Clergy
- Bishop: Mons. František Radkovský
- Vicar: The city of Plzeň

The Church of All Saints (Czech: Kostel Všech svatých) is a church in Plzeň in the Czech Republic. It is one of the oldest churches in the area and it was considered the main parish church of the early villages of Plzeň, Malice and Záhorsko before the construction of the Cathedral of St. Bartholomew was completed.

== History ==
The initial Romanesque church was constructed in the 13th century.

In 1310, the Henry of Bohemia granted the patronage right to the Teutonic order, which enforced this right and established the church of St. Bartholomew, which was set to become the parish church of the early Plzeň.

According to result of the new situation the Church of All Saints lost its privileged status and become a filial church. The church was reconstructed in the Gothic style at the end of the 14th century.

During the Hussite Wars, the church's nave was significantly damaged and for this reason the church was repaired during the rest of the century.

In 1743, a Baroque entrance hall was built as an annex to the initial entrance gate.

There were numerous continuous repairs during the 19th century. The repairs also focused on the interior.

During a World War II bombardment, a stray bomb fell down through the presbytery of the church and the altar and caused a significant damage. Part of the presbytery burned down.

After a whole century of repairs the church was opened and consecrated again by Mons. František Radkovský in 1995. Nowadays the church is maintained and operated by the franciscans of Plzeň.

== Church exterior ==
The temple is a one nave church with a presbytery on the eastern portion, which ends at a polygonal five-sided closure. The wall and pillar lining materials are blocks of sandstone.

=== Entrance ===
The main entrance at the southern façade serves as an access to the church. It has two concave walls with two late Baroque rounded windows lined with pilasters ending in a baluster entablature with a densely profiled molding.

=== Presbytery and the church nave ===
The presbytery and the nave are supported by diagonal and setback buttresses with roof-like skews. The church's entire parameter is encircled by a window ledge. The presbytery is surrounded by plinths culminating in a cornice of the window-sill. All four presbytery windows are Gothic with the flamboyant, a flame-like tracery.

The other windows in the nave have a form of a pointed shape without traceries.

=== Church sacristy ===
The northern part of the presbytery wall is nowadays connected by the portal with the sacristy, which was originally built as a separate chapel without access to the church.

The sacristy is supported by diagonal buttresses topped with roof-like skews. It is covered with a shed roof connecting to the presbytery. Similarly, as the nave windows, the shape of the window on the eastern side is pointed.

== Church interior ==
=== Church nave and presbytery ===
The nave is vaulted by a groin vault with the ribs leading to decorative cantilevers located along the interior walls. A high choir was built on the western end of the nave in the 16th century. Similarly, the space under the high choir is vaulted by a groin vault with a spiral staircase leading to the upper level.

A linear massive pointed triumphal arch divides the nave from the presbytery. The presbytery is vaulted by a figured rib vault, which is ending in a polygonal five-sided closing. Rectangular supports standing on a plinth surrounding the presbytery support the vault.

=== Church sacristy ===
The sacristy is vaulted by a jumping vault that leads to the diagonal buttress-supported console.

== Gallery ==
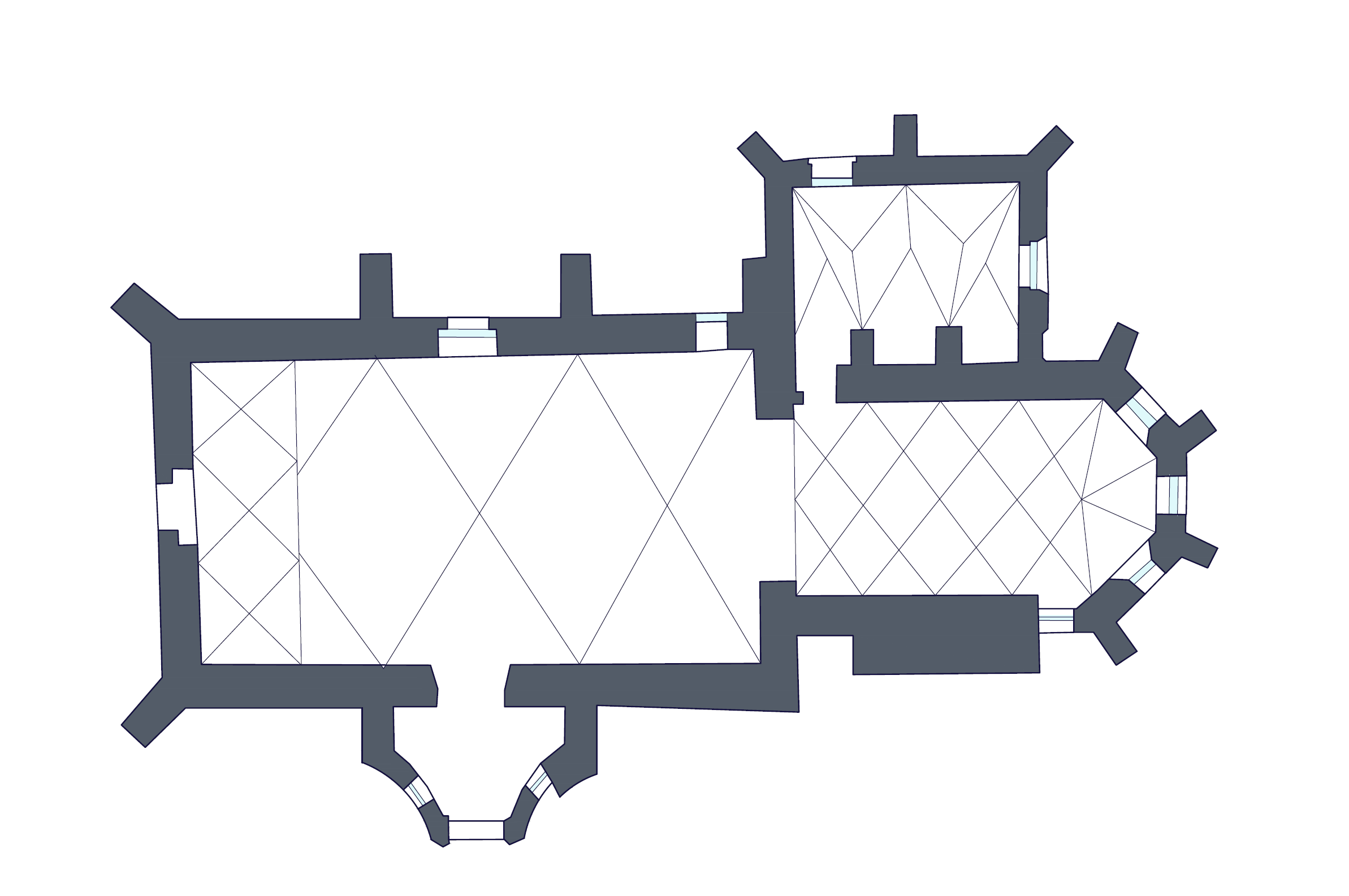
Ground plan scheme

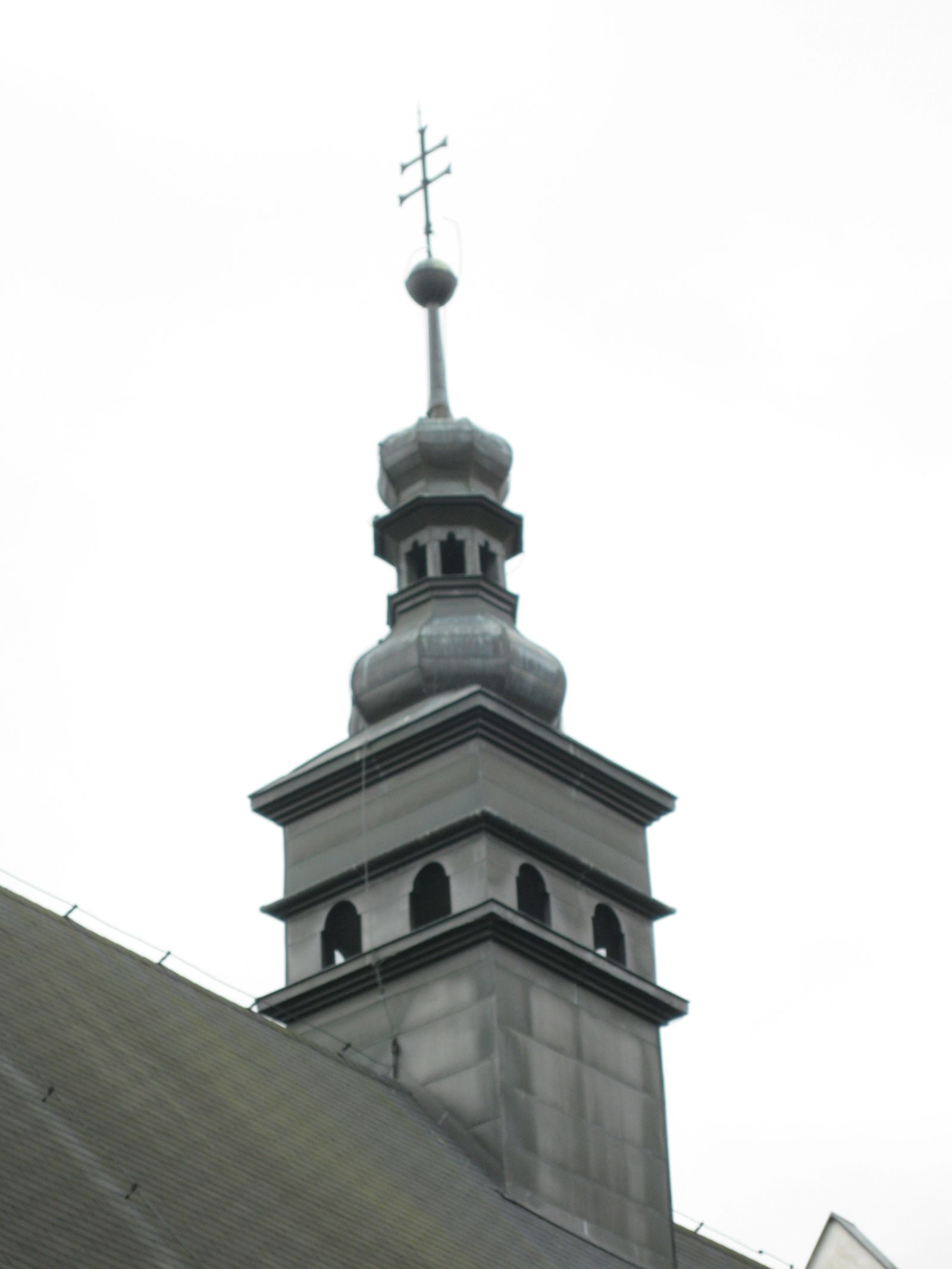
Tower

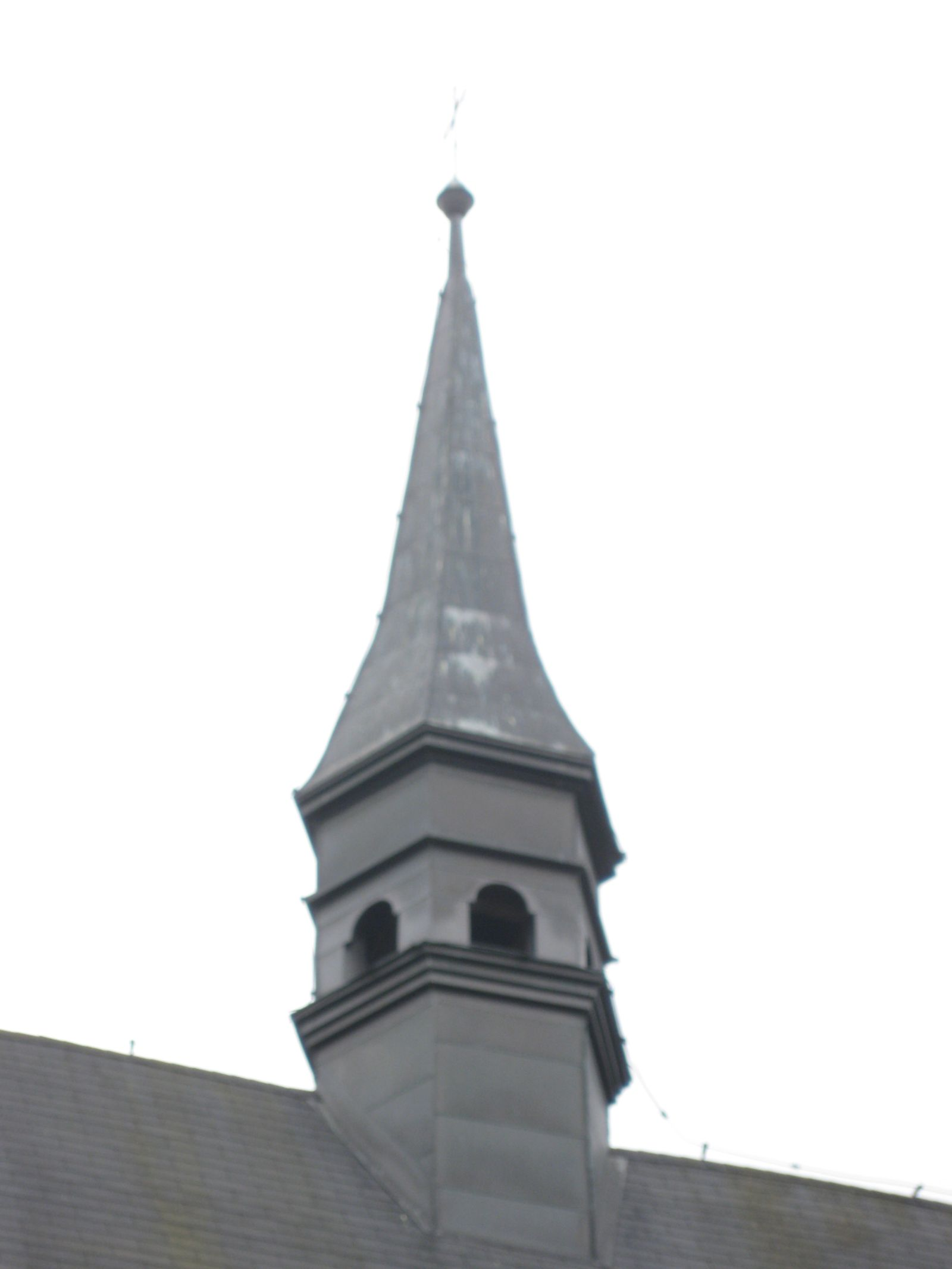
Chancel turret

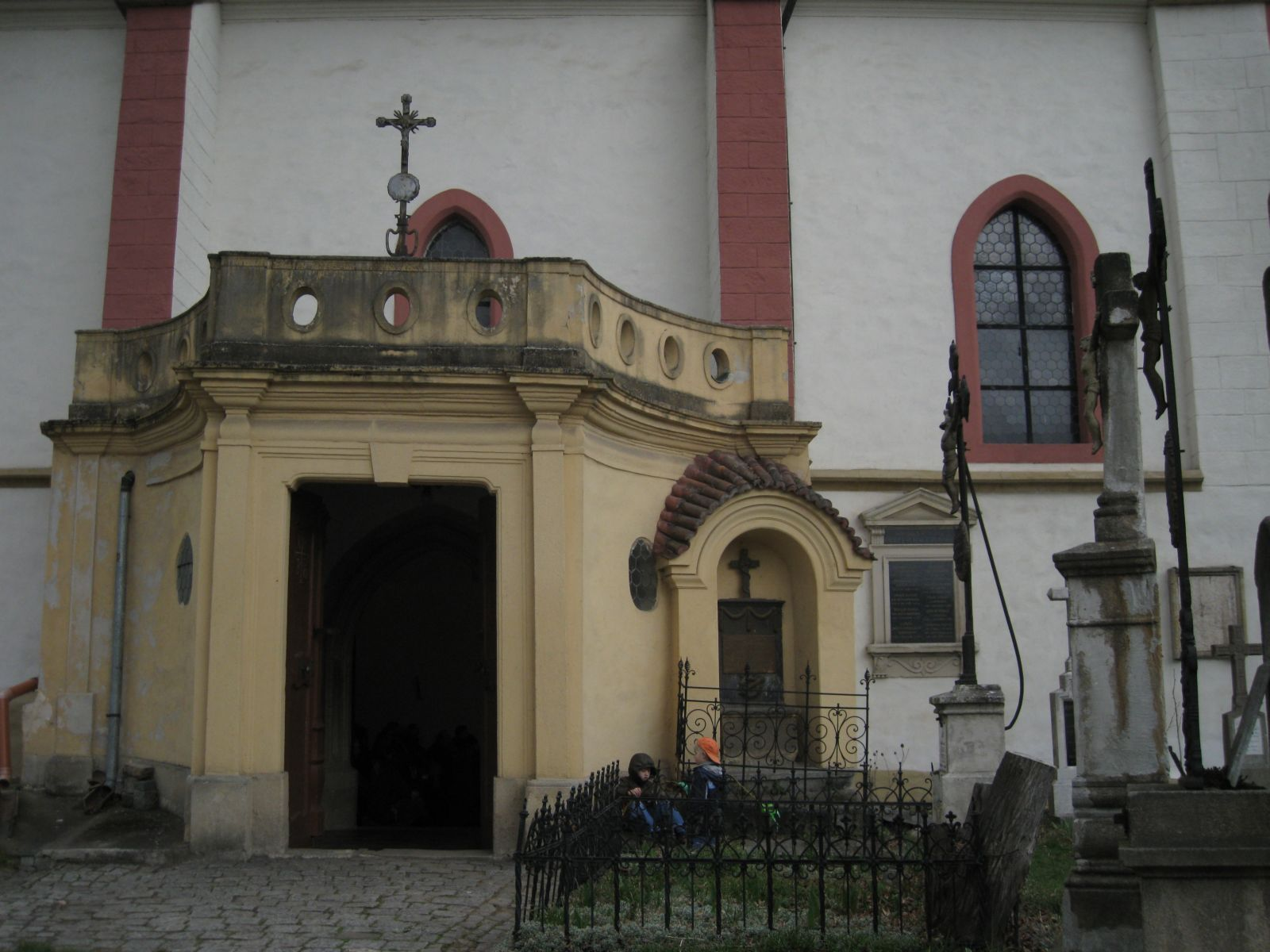
Baroque entrance

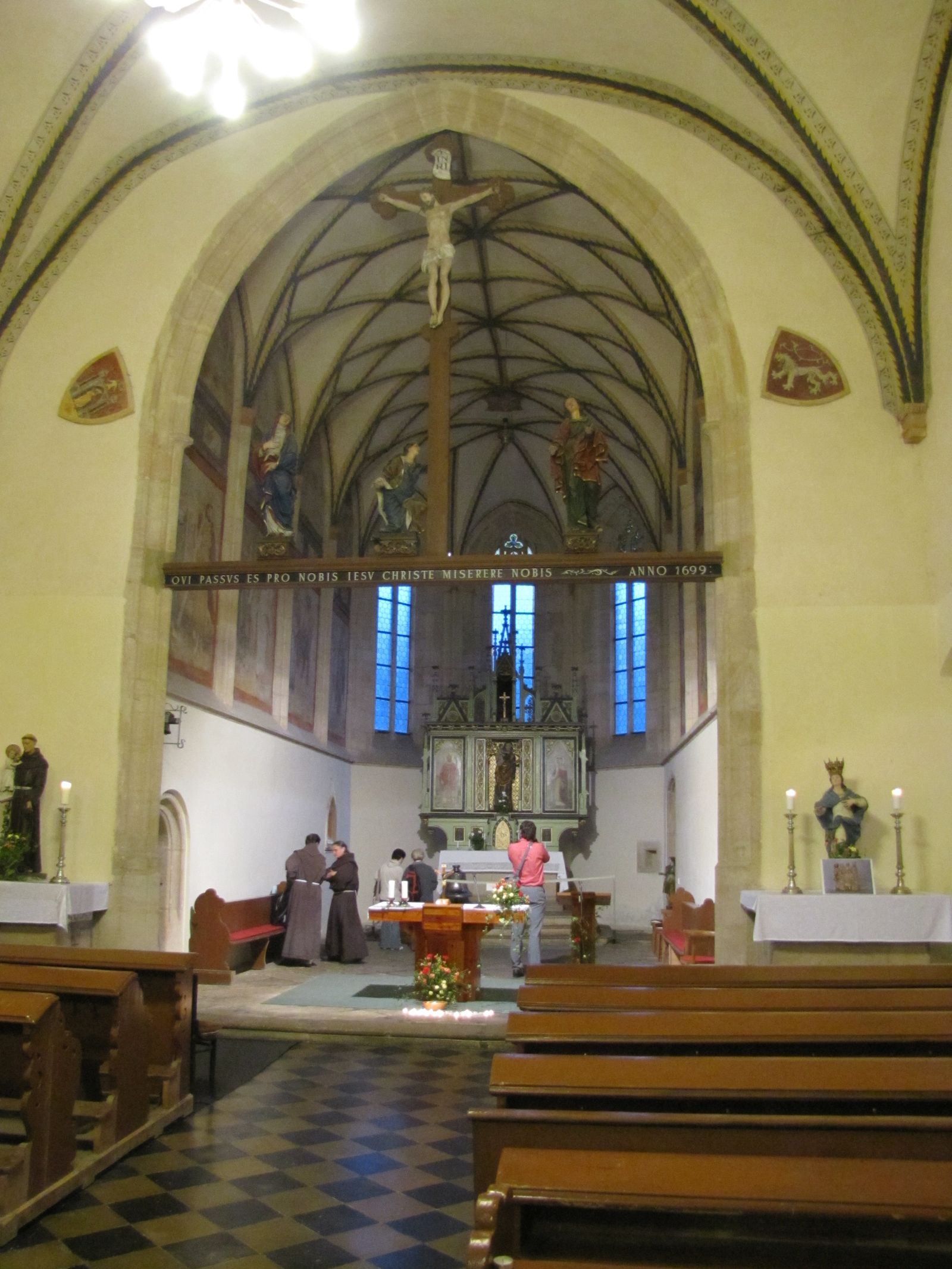
Church interior and presbytery

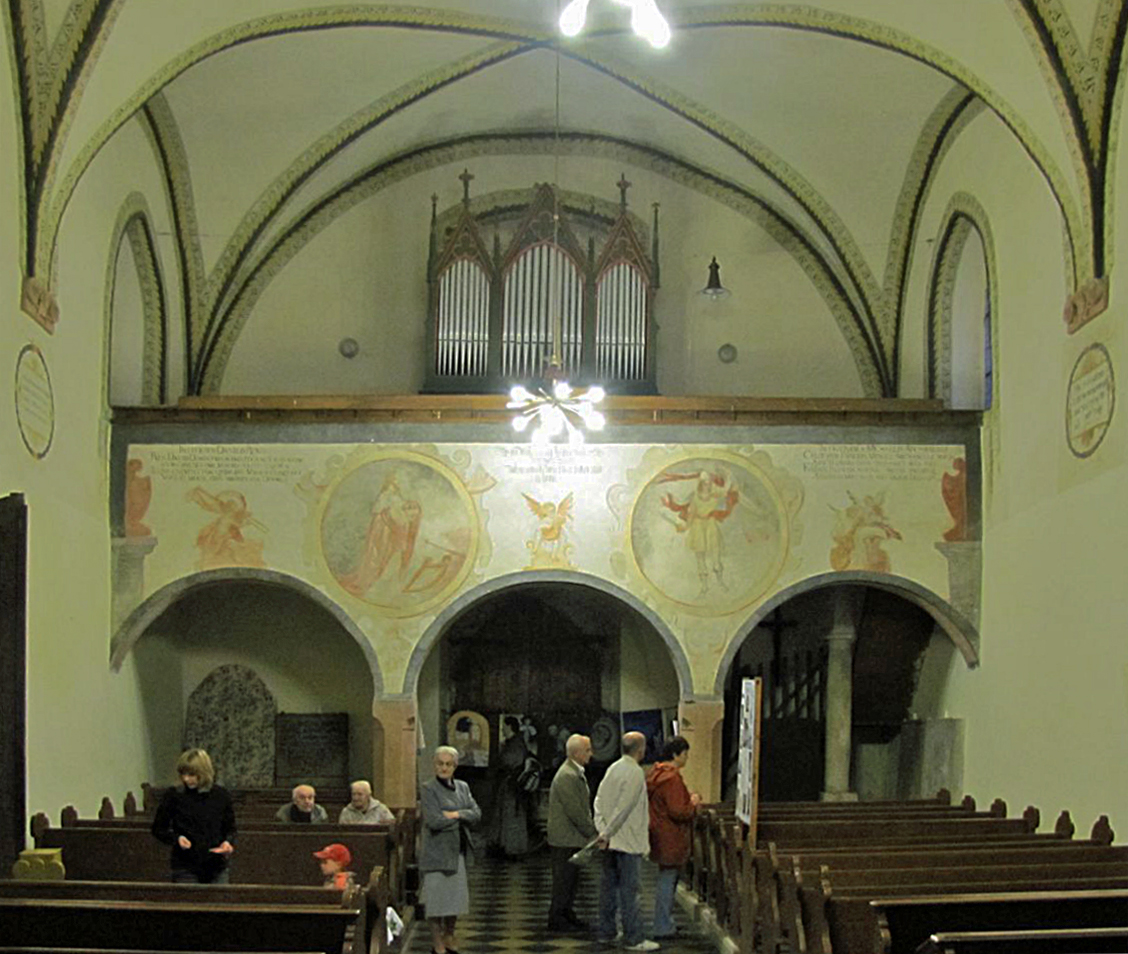
Interior and high choir

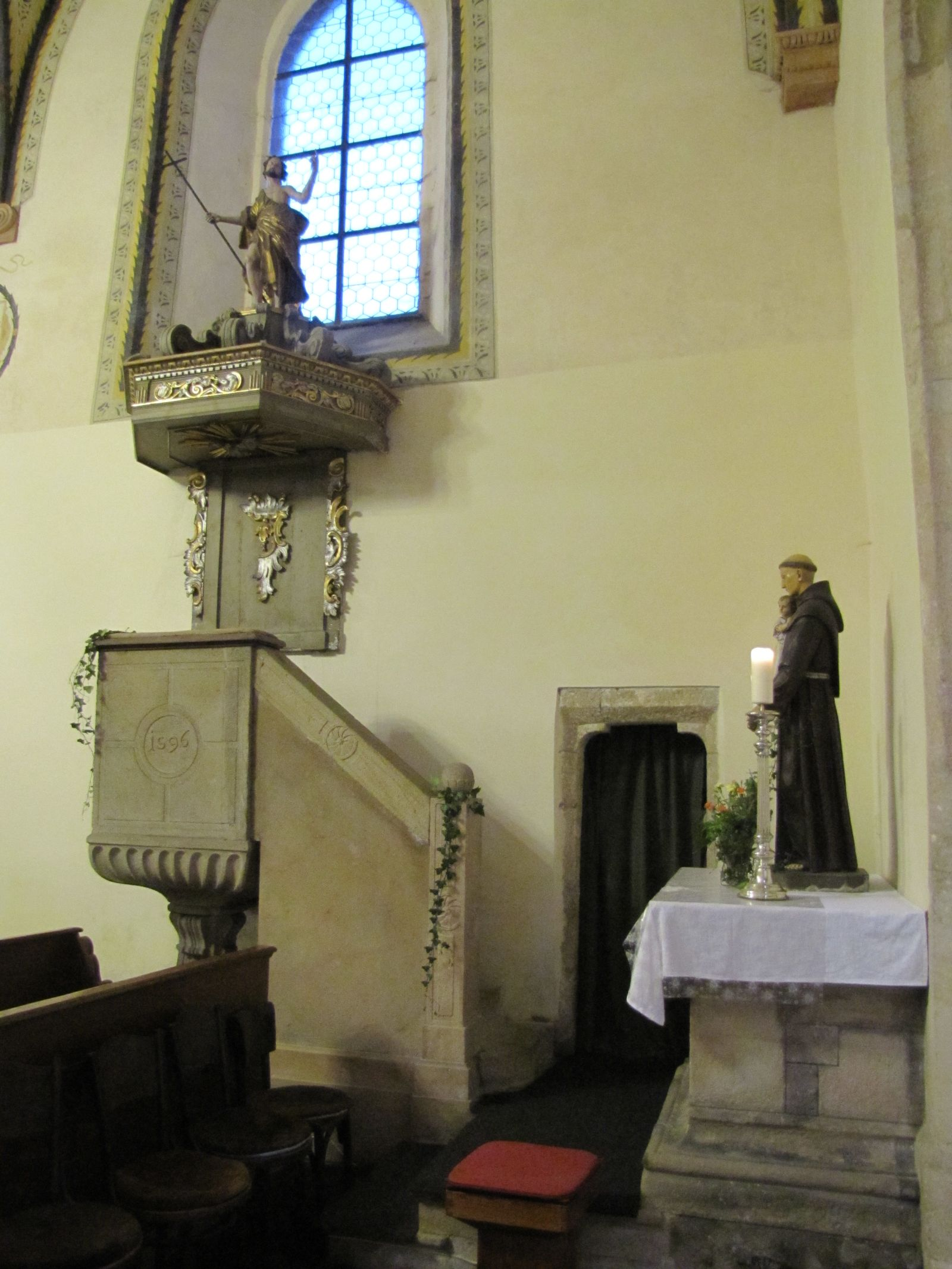
Interior, nave pulpit

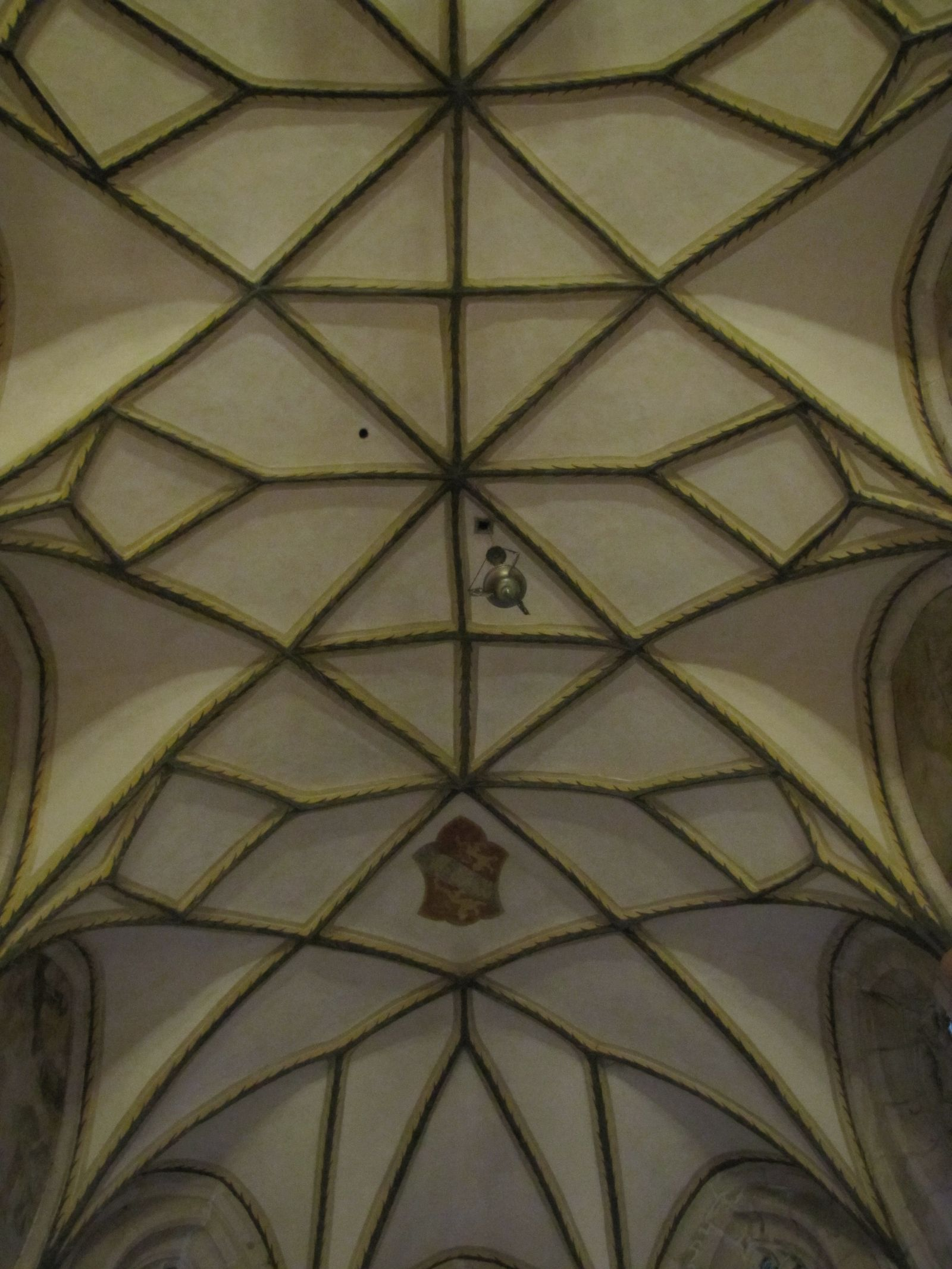
Vault in the presbytery

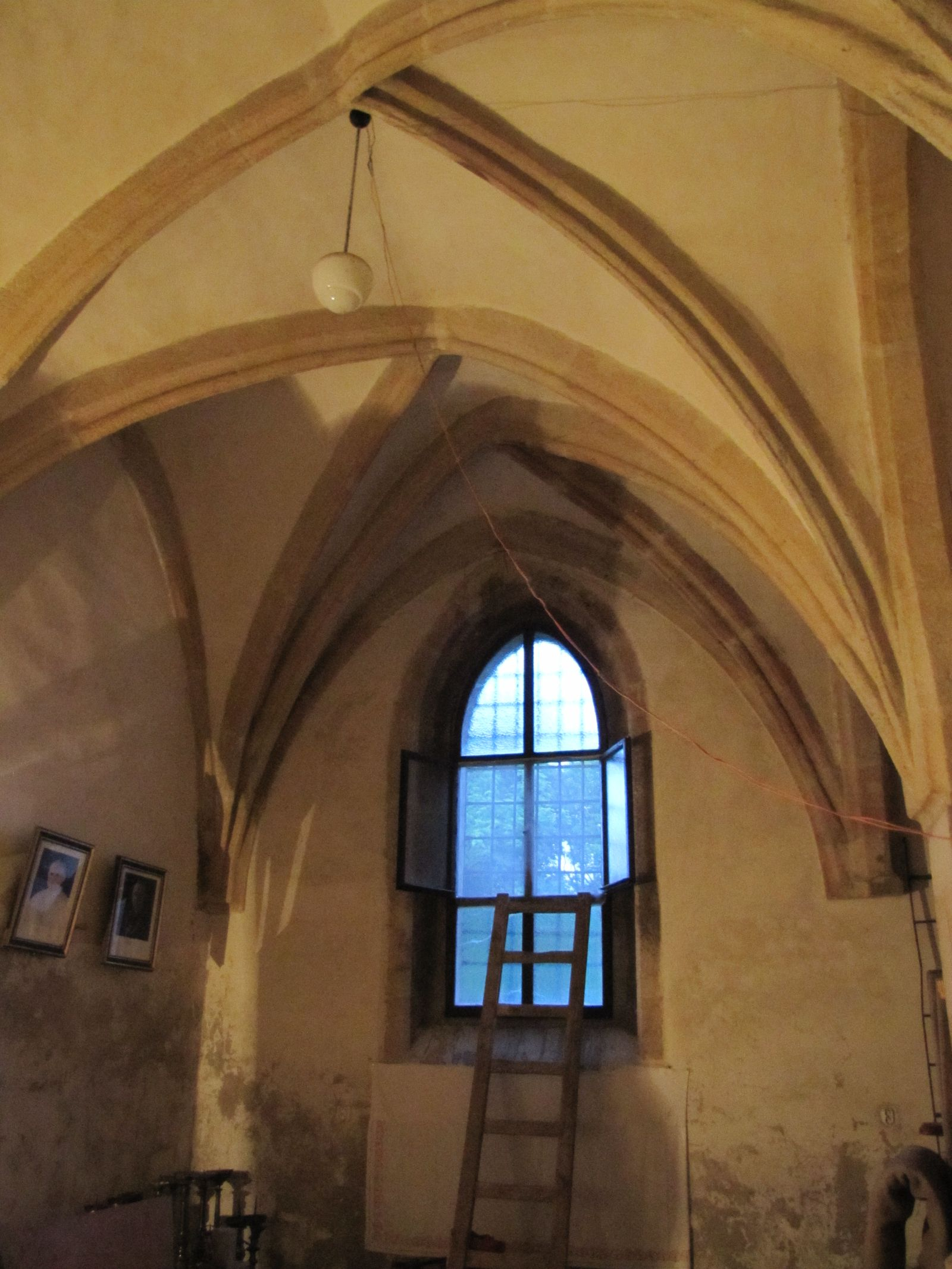
Sacristy, jumping vault

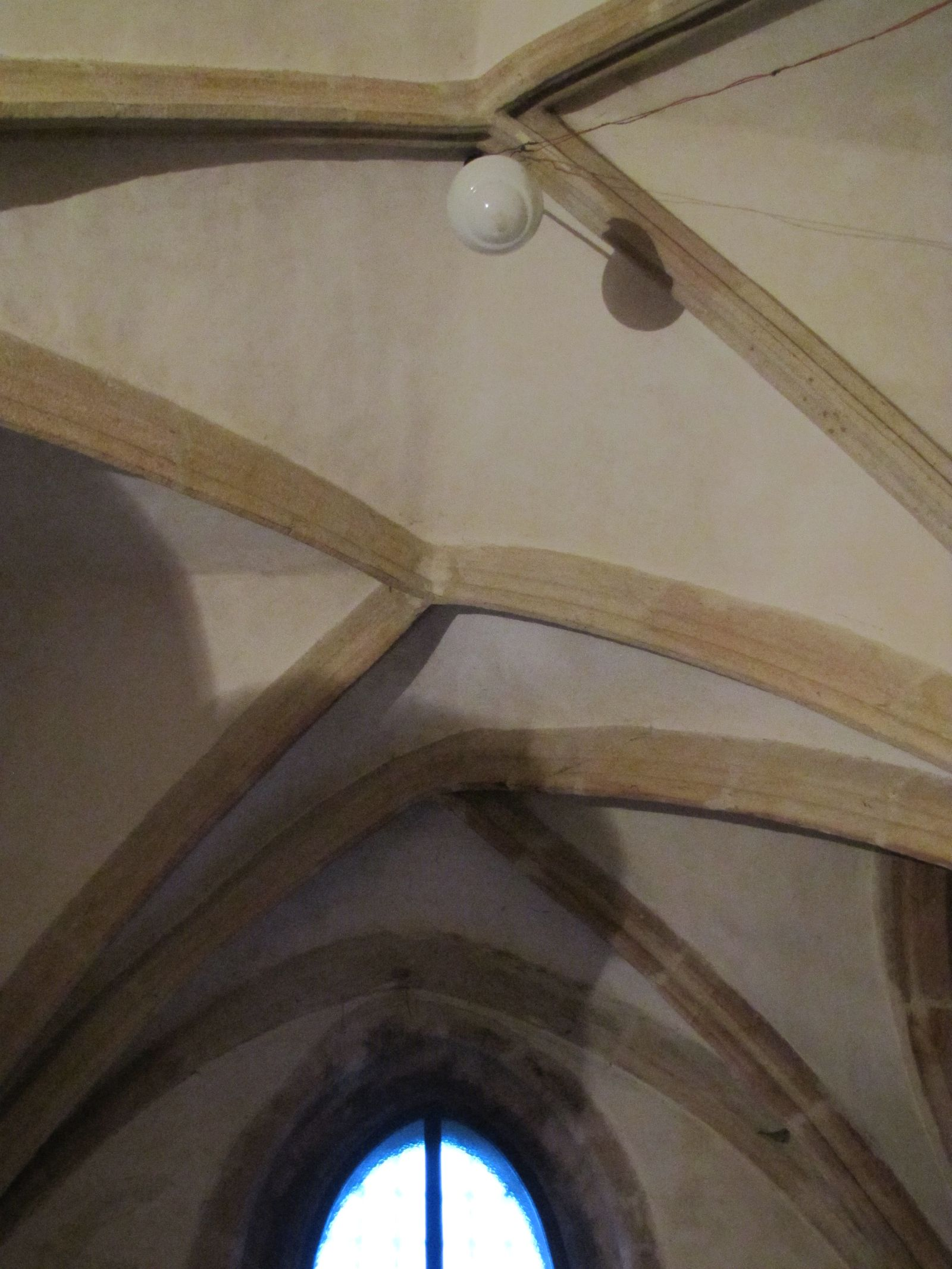
Jumping vault
