= Pavel Samiec =

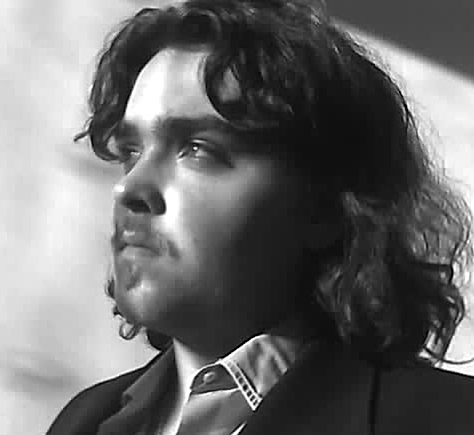

Background information
- Born: 30 August 1984 (age 41); Plzeň, Czechoslovakia
- Genres: Classical
- Occupation(s): Composer, accordionist

Pavel Samiec (born 30 August 1984) is a Czech composer and accordionist.

== Education and professional career ==
In 2000–2006, he studied the accordion at Conservatory of Plzeň under Ludmila Rottenbornová and later at University of West Bohemia under Jarmila Vlachová. In 2006–2012, he studied composition under Jiří Bezděk.

As an accordionist he took part of many national and international competitions and is a winner of the International Accordion Competition in Reinach, Switzerland (2003).

His compositions have been performed on various international music festivals (Kleine Tage für Harmonika Klingenthal, Beethovenův Hradec,...).

== List of works composed by Pavel Samiec ==
=== Chamber music ===
- Kontemplace (2005) — organ passacaglia
- String quartet (2005–2006)
- Preludium and fuga (2006) — organ, dedicated to Veronika Husinecká
- Variace na vlastní nálady (2007) — piano
- Sonata per violoncello e piano (2007)
- Osvity (2008) — for piano, violin and cello, inspired by poetry of Daniel Soukup
- Zátiší (2008) — for accordion, violin and cello
- Kašperská Nokturna (2009) — flute quartet
- Fantasie for violin and accordion "Našeptávač" (2009), dedicated to Jakub Jedlinský and Iva Kramperová
- Vzpomínky dvorního šaška (2009) — children suite per accordion
- Sonatina GABRETA for flute and piano
- Sonata da chiesa for accordion
- "Bouře" — fantasia for accordion
- Sentence for Violin and Piano (2010) – dedicated to Marek Pavelec and Jan Šimandl
- Fragments of the time (2015) – piano quintet
- "HORETISAI - surrealistic vision for piano" (2011) – dedicated to Jiří Pešek
- Piano Sonata No.1 (2016) – dedicated to Věra Müllerová
- Sonata No. 2 for accordion (2013)
- Sonata No. 3 for accordion "Buffa"
- Casus Icari (2012) – fantasy for accordion – dedicated to J. Vlachová
- Children suite for accordion No.3 "Winter" (2016)
- Children suite for accordion No.4 "Populaire" (2017)

=== Songs ===
- Mlhy a deště (2006–2007) — alt and piano, lyrics by Charles Baudelaire
- Básníkův povzdech (2008) — tenor and piano
- Nesnadné léto (2008) — alt, piano and accordion, lyrics by Jan Skácel
- Když po poli chodí smuténka... (2011) – soprano and piano, lyrics by Jan Skácel

=== Orchestral ===
- De profundis clamavi (2005) — String orchestra, choir and solo soprano
- Concerto for accordion and orchestra (2008–2009) – dedicated to Radek Dlouhý
- Dies sanctificatus (2009–2010)
- Úslava (2014) – symphonic poem
- Canción del amor y Danza de la muerte (2011) – orchestral fantasy – dedicated to Orquesta Sinfónica Chamartín (Madrid)
- Firework music (2012)
- Sketches for accordion and symphony orchestra (2013) - dedicated to Marcela Matějková
- Oratorio k Panně Marii Klatovské (2014 - 2015)
