= Pliskov =

Pliskov may refer to:

- Pliska, a small village, and the historical capital of Bulgaria
- Plískov, a municipality and village in the Czech Republic
- Plyskiv, Ukraine, a village in Vinnytsia Oblast, Ukraine

== See also ==
- Plíšek, a surname, one of whose feminine variants is Plíškova
