= Kornatice =

- Municipality
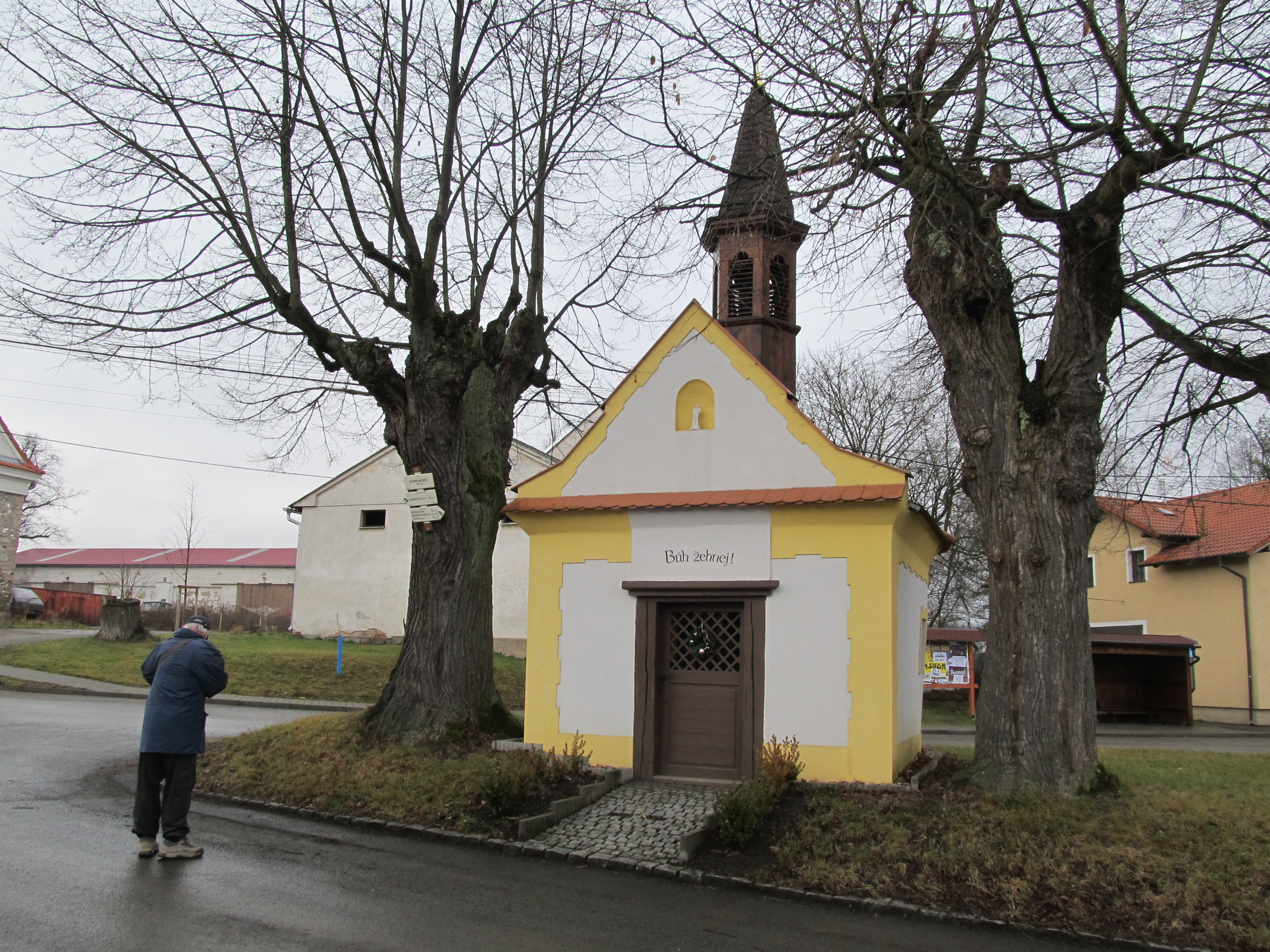
- Chapel of Saint Margaret the Virgin

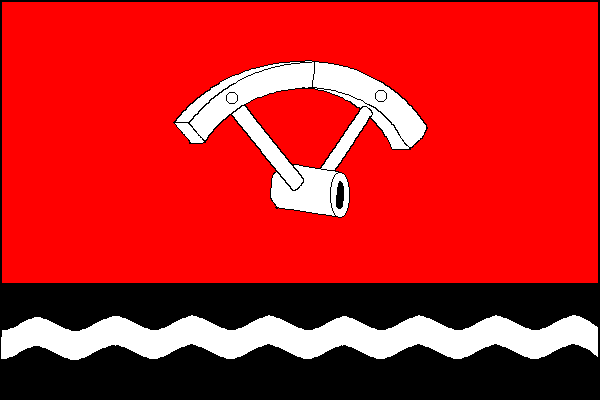
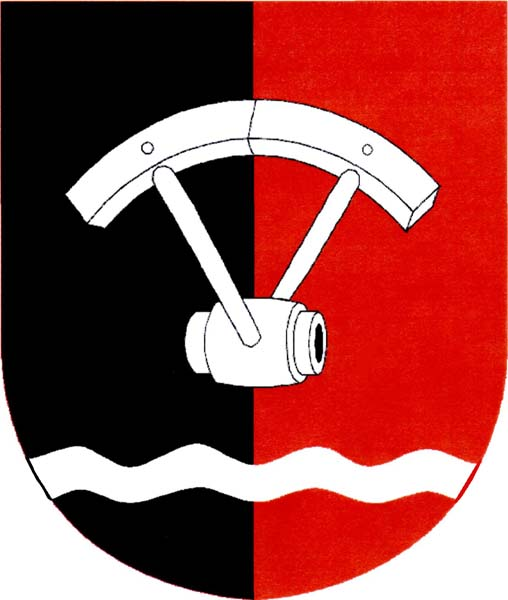
- Flag Coat of arms

- Location in the Czech Republic
- Coordinates: 49°39′33″N 13°35′32″E
- Country: Czech Republic
- Region: Plzeň
- District: Rokycany
- First mentioned: 1368

Area
  - Total: 5.13 km^{2} (1.98 sq mi)
- Elevation: 413 m (1,355 ft)

Population (2026-01-01)
  - Total: 294
  - Density: 57.3/km^{2} (148/sq mi)
- Time zone: UTC+1 (CET)
  - Summer (DST): UTC+2 (CEST)
- Postal code: 338 43
- Website: www.kornatice.cz

Kornatice is a municipality and village in Rokycany District in the Plzeň Region of the Czech Republic. It has about 300 inhabitants.

Kornatice lies approximately 10 kilometres (6 mi) south of Rokycany, 19 km (12 mi) south-east of Plzeň, and 76 km (47 mi) south-west of Prague.

== Demographics ==
Historical population
Year	Pop.	±%
1869	294	—
1880	346	+17.7%
1890	330	−4.6%
1900	270	−18.2%
1910	274	+1.5%
1921	259	−5.5%
1930	264	+1.9%
1950	205	−22.3%
1961	200	−2.4%
1970	155	−22.5%
1980	132	−14.8%
1991	104	−21.2%
2001	107	+2.9%
2011	156	+45.8%
2021	239	+53.2%
Source: Censuses
