= Líšná (Rokycany District) =

- Municipality
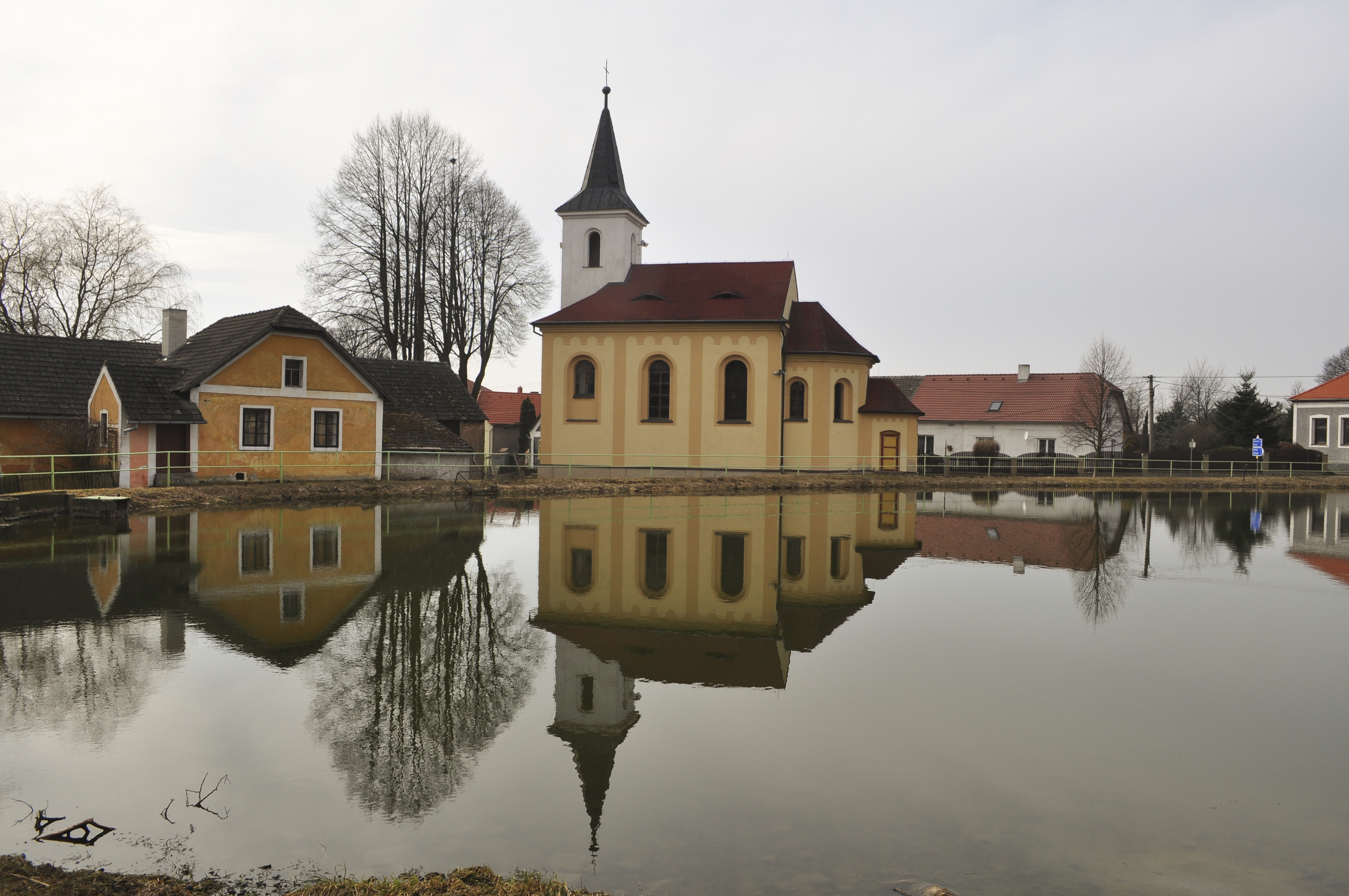
- Centre of Líšná with the Church of Saint Wenceslaus

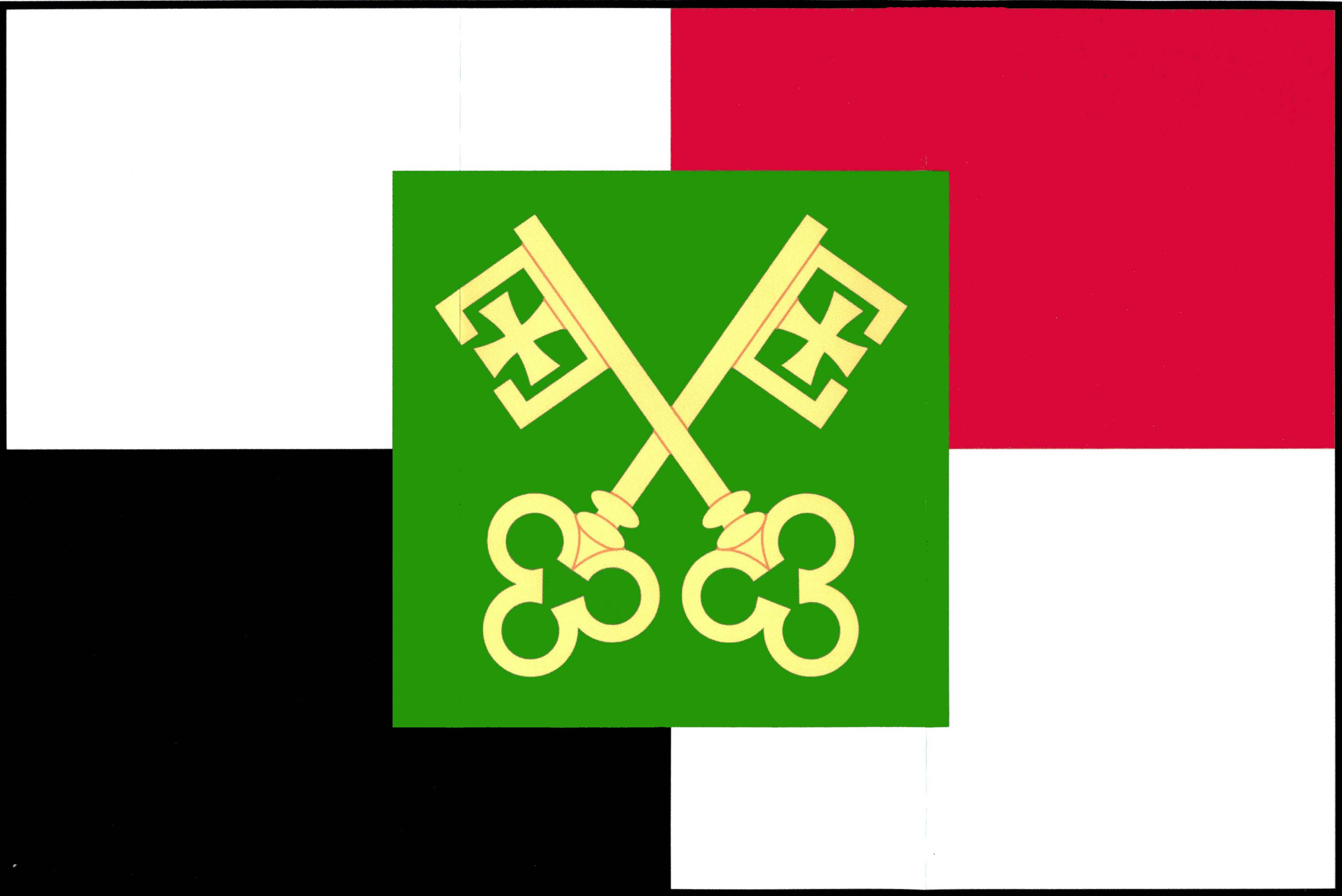
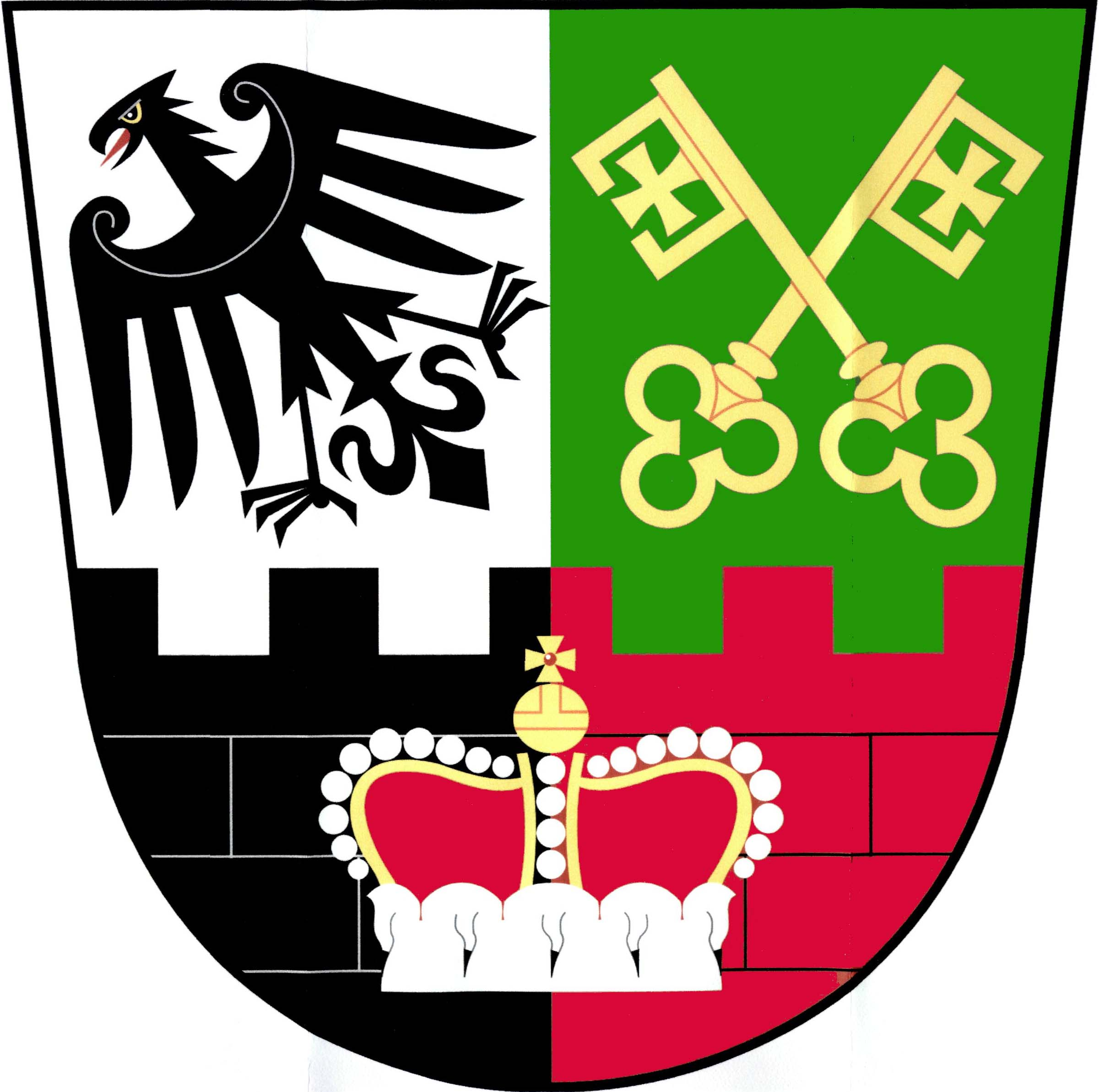
- Flag Coat of arms

- Location in the Czech Republic
- Coordinates: 49°53′6″N 13°48′23″E
- Country: Czech Republic
- Region: Plzeň
- District: Rokycany
- First mentioned: 1539

Area
  - Total: 18.84 km^{2} (7.27 sq mi)
- Elevation: 527 m (1,729 ft)

Population (2026-01-01)
  - Total: 205
  - Density: 10.9/km^{2} (28.2/sq mi)
- Time zone: UTC+1 (CET)
  - Summer (DST): UTC+2 (CEST)
- Postal code: 338 08
- Website: www.lisna.cz

Líšná (Czech pronunciation: [ˈliːʃnaː]) is a municipality and village in Rokycany District in the Plzeň Region of the Czech Republic. It has about 200 inhabitants.

Líšná lies approximately 23 kilometres (14 mi) north-east of Rokycany, 35 km (22 mi) north-east of Plzeň, and 50 km (31 mi) south-west of Prague.

== History ==
The first written mention of Líšná is from 1539.

== Demographics ==
Historical population
Year	Pop.	±%
1869	369	—
1880	392	+6.2%
1890	392	+0.0%
1900	393	+0.3%
1910	335	−14.8%
1921	337	+0.6%
1930	359	+6.5%
1950	235	−34.5%
1961	269	+14.5%
1970	249	−7.4%
1980	191	−23.3%
1991	171	−10.5%
2001	179	+4.7%
2011	162	−9.5%
2021	192	+18.5%
Source: Censuses
