= Cekov =

- Municipality
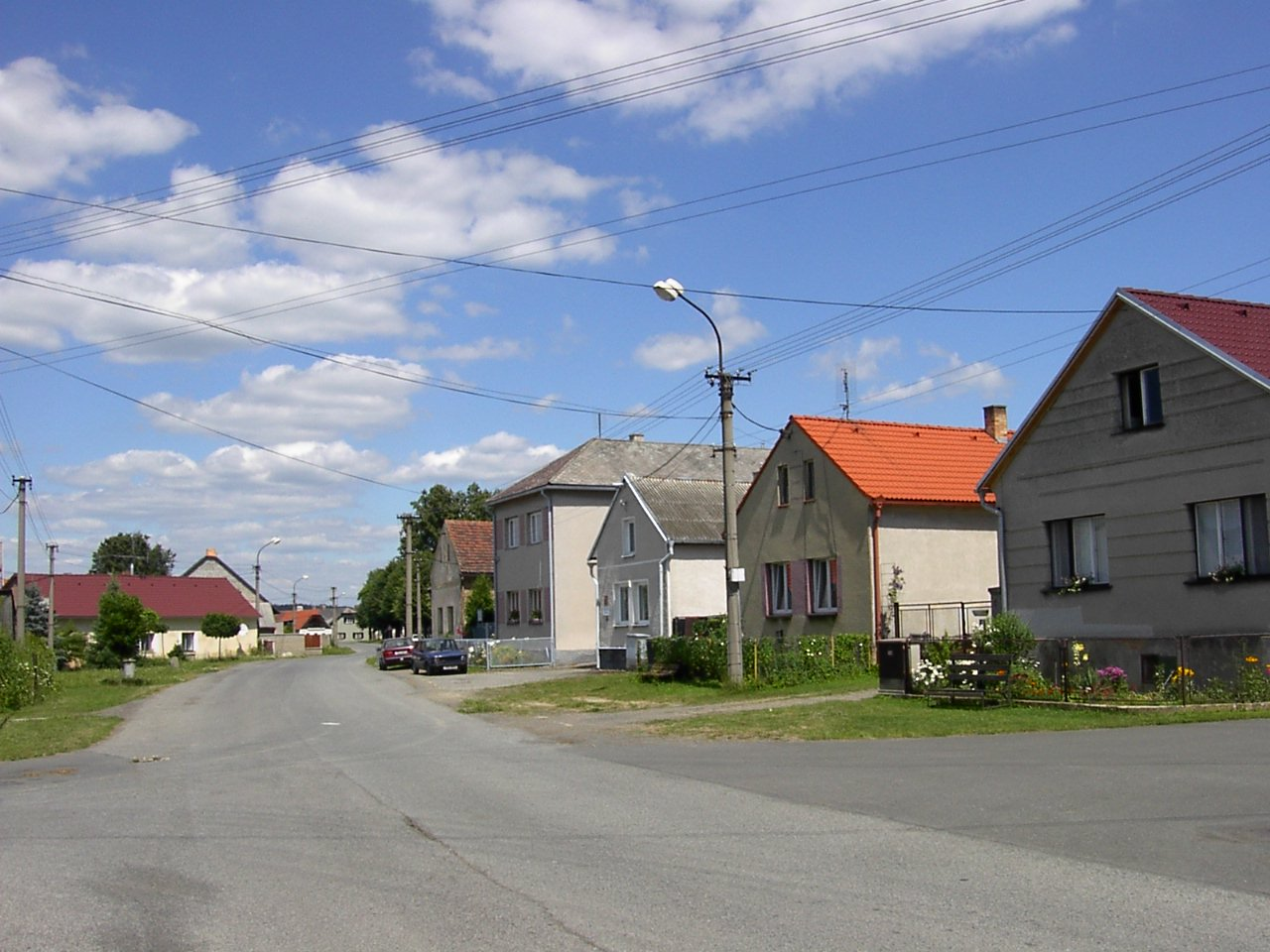
- Main street

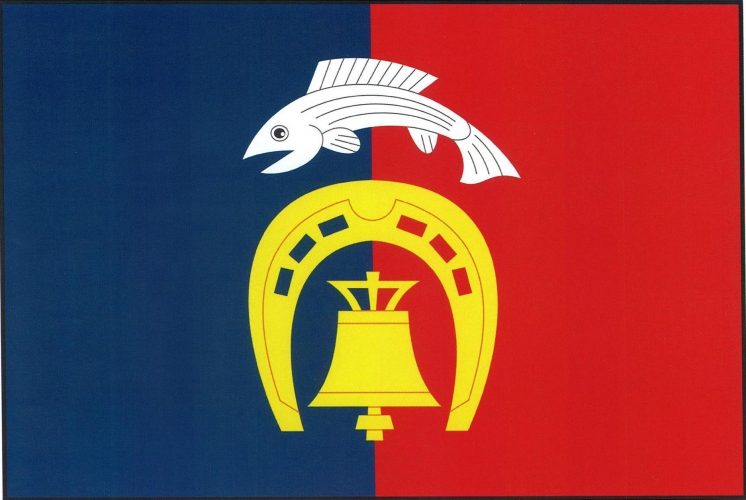
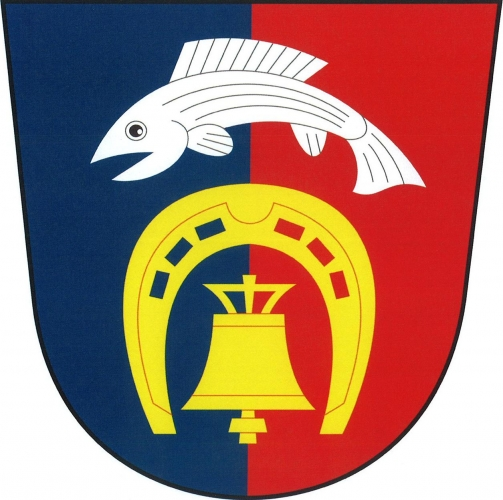
- Flag Coat of arms

- Location in the Czech Republic
- Coordinates: 49°49′19″N 13°45′50″E
- Country: Czech Republic
- Region: Plzeň
- District: Rokycany
- First mentioned: 1273

Area
  - Total: 4.29 km^{2} (1.66 sq mi)
- Elevation: 463 m (1,519 ft)

Population (2026-01-01)
  - Total: 187
  - Density: 43.6/km^{2} (113/sq mi)
- Time zone: UTC+1 (CET)
  - Summer (DST): UTC+2 (CEST)
- Postal code: 338 08
- Website: www.obeccekov.cz

Cekov is a municipality and village in Rokycany District in the Plzeň Region of the Czech Republic. It has about 200 inhabitants.

Cekov lies approximately 16 kilometres (10 mi) north-east of Rokycany, 30 km (19 mi) east of Plzeň, and 56 km (35 mi) south-west of Prague.

== History ==
The first written mention of Cekov is from 1273. During the Hussite Wars, the village completely burned down, but was restored. Cekov was burned down again during the Thirty Years' War in 1639. After the fishpond Cekovský rybník was founded, the village was moved from its original location to its present location.

From 1 April 1980 to 28 February 1990, Cekov was a municipal part of Kařez.

== Demographics ==
Historical population
Year	Pop.	±%
1869	396	—
1880	358	−9.6%
1890	302	−15.6%
1900	305	+1.0%
1910	328	+7.5%
1921	313	−4.6%
1930	322	+2.9%
1950	253	−21.4%
1961	260	+2.8%
1970	216	−16.9%
1980	156	−27.8%
1991	119	−23.7%
2001	120	+0.8%
2011	123	+2.5%
2021	151	+22.8%
Source: Censuses
