= Skořice =

- Municipality
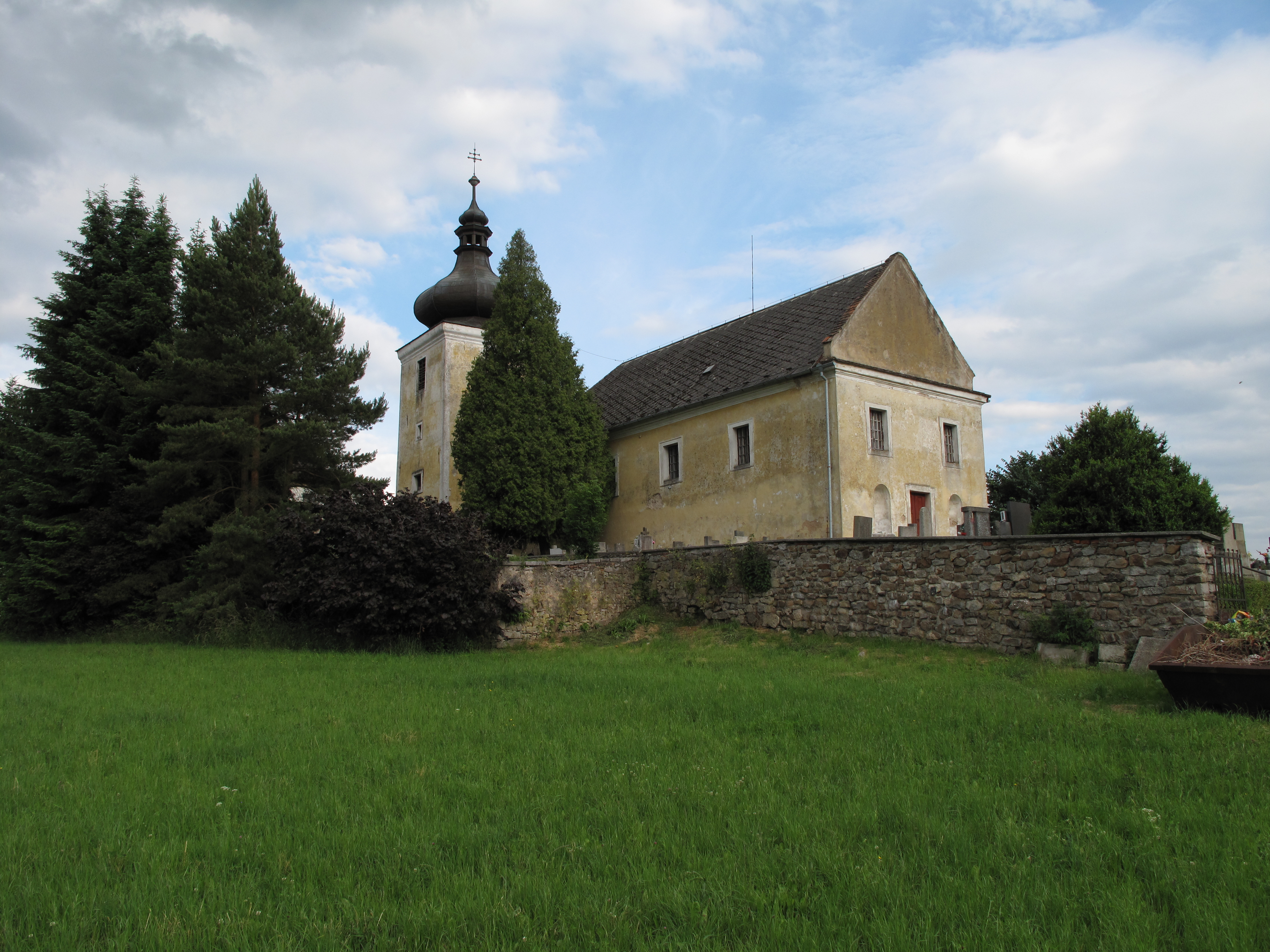
- Church of Saint Wenceslaus

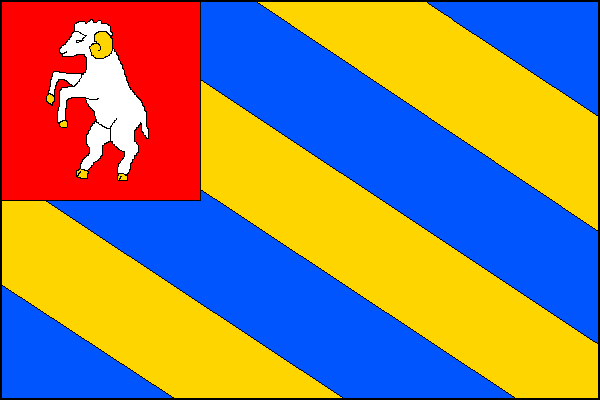
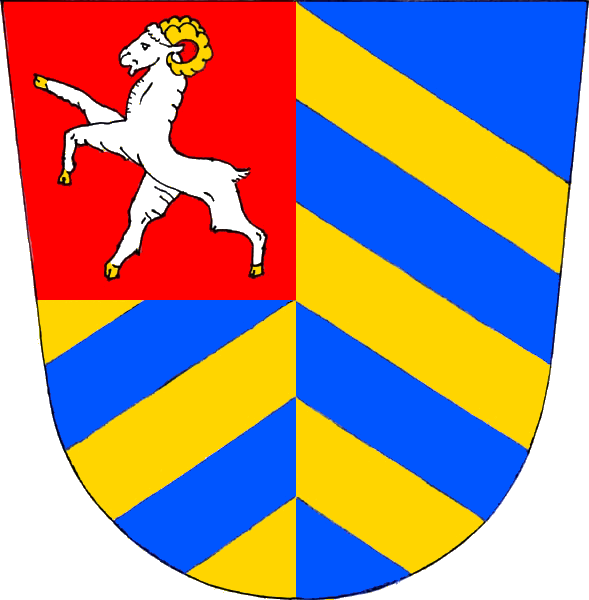
- Flag Coat of arms

- Location in the Czech Republic
- Coordinates: 49°40′40″N 13°42′19″E
- Country: Czech Republic
- Region: Plzeň
- District: Rokycany
- First mentioned: 1352

Area
  - Total: 23.75 km^{2} (9.17 sq mi)
- Elevation: 553 m (1,814 ft)

Population (2026-01-01)
  - Total: 280
  - Density: 12/km^{2} (31/sq mi)
- Time zone: UTC+1 (CET)
  - Summer (DST): UTC+2 (CEST)
- Postal code: 338 43
- Website: www.skorice.cz

Skořice is a municipality and village in Rokycany District in the Plzeň Region of the Czech Republic. It has about 300 inhabitants.

Skořice lies approximately 13 kilometres (8 mi) south-east of Rokycany, 26 km (16 mi) east of Plzeň, and 69 km (43 mi) south-west of Prague.

== Demographics ==
Historical population
Year	Pop.	±%
1869	1,359	—
1880	1,459	+7.4%
1890	1,502	+2.9%
1900	1,286	−14.4%
1910	1,094	−14.9%
1921	1,023	−6.5%
1930	960	−6.2%
1950	479	−50.1%
1961	370	−22.8%
1970	322	−13.0%
1980	290	−9.9%
1991	233	−19.7%
2001	263	+12.9%
2011	255	−3.0%
2021	254	−0.4%
Source: Censuses
