= Sebečice =

- Municipality
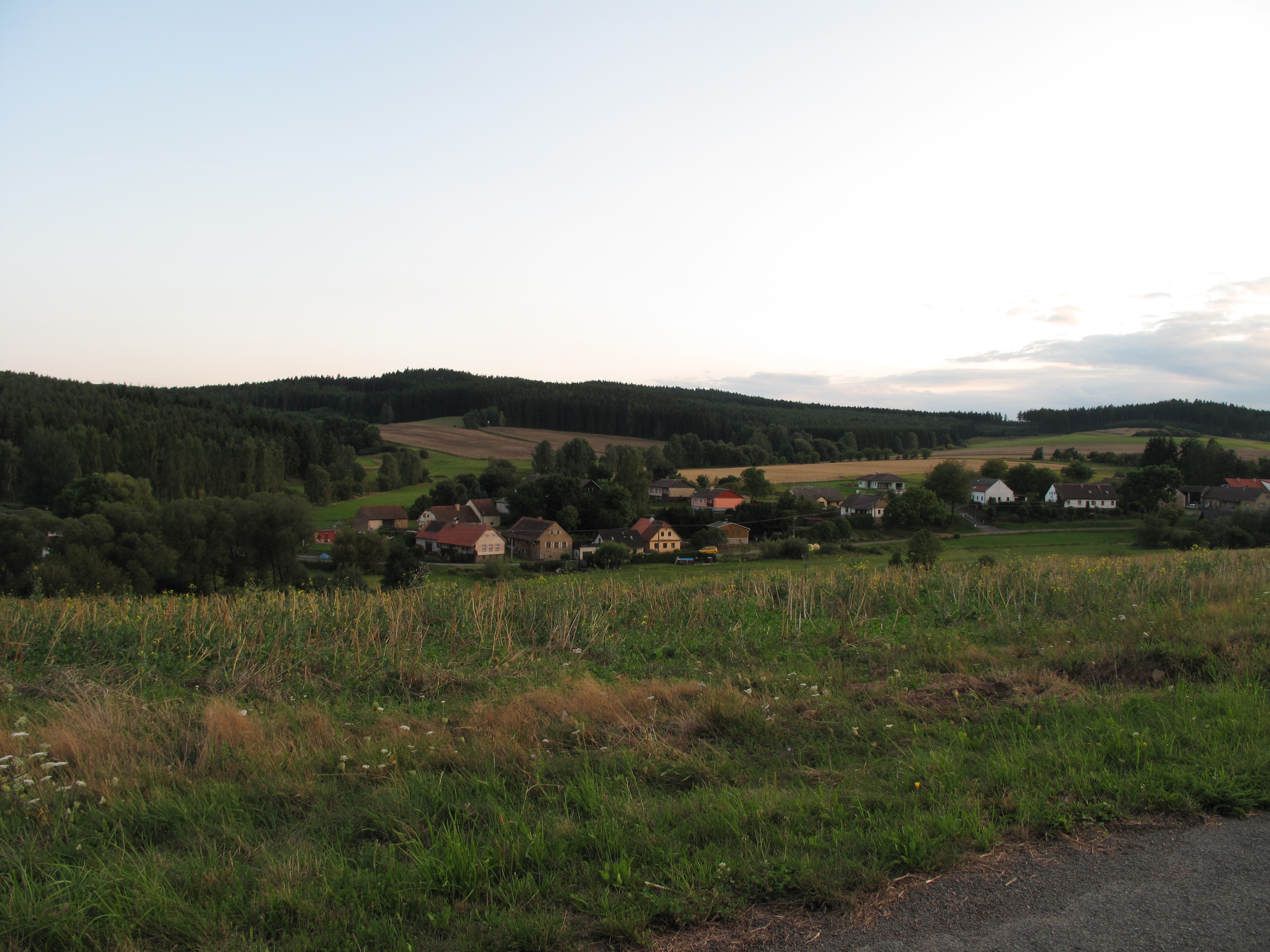
- General view

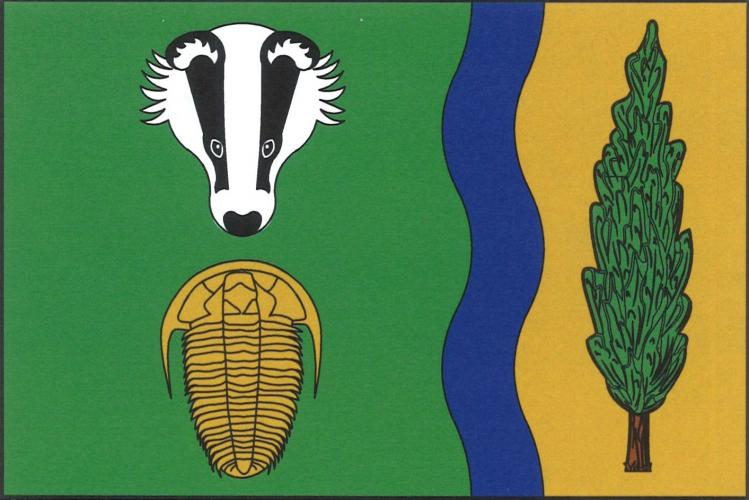
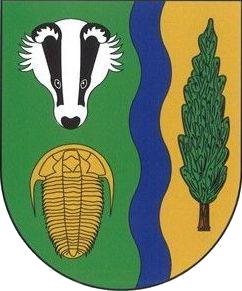
- Flag Coat of arms

- Location in the Czech Republic
- Coordinates: 49°52′12″N 13°41′32″E
- Country: Czech Republic
- Region: Plzeň
- District: Rokycany
- First mentioned: 1359

Area
  - Total: 6.67 km^{2} (2.58 sq mi)
- Elevation: 462 m (1,516 ft)

Population (2026-01-01)
  - Total: 80
  - Density: 12/km^{2} (31/sq mi)
- Time zone: UTC+1 (CET)
  - Summer (DST): UTC+2 (CEST)
- Postal code: 338 08
- Website: www.sebecice.cz

Sebečice is a municipality and village in Rokycany District in the Plzeň Region of the Czech Republic. It has about 80 inhabitants.

Sebečice lies approximately 16 kilometres (10 mi) north-east of Rokycany, 27 km (17 mi) north-east of Plzeň, and 58 km (36 mi) south-west of Prague.

== Administrative division ==
Sebečice consists of two municipal parts (in brackets population according to the 2021 census):

- Sebečice (51)
- Biskoupky (23)

== Demographics ==
Historical population
Year	Pop.	±%
1869	546	—
1880	565	+3.5%
1890	438	−22.5%
1900	387	−11.6%
1910	347	−10.3%
1921	315	−9.2%
1930	265	−15.9%
1950	206	−22.3%
1961	178	−13.6%
1970	129	−27.5%
1980	106	−17.8%
1991	90	−15.1%
2001	77	−14.4%
2011	69	−10.4%
2021	74	+7.2%
Source: Censuses
