= Sirá =

- Municipality
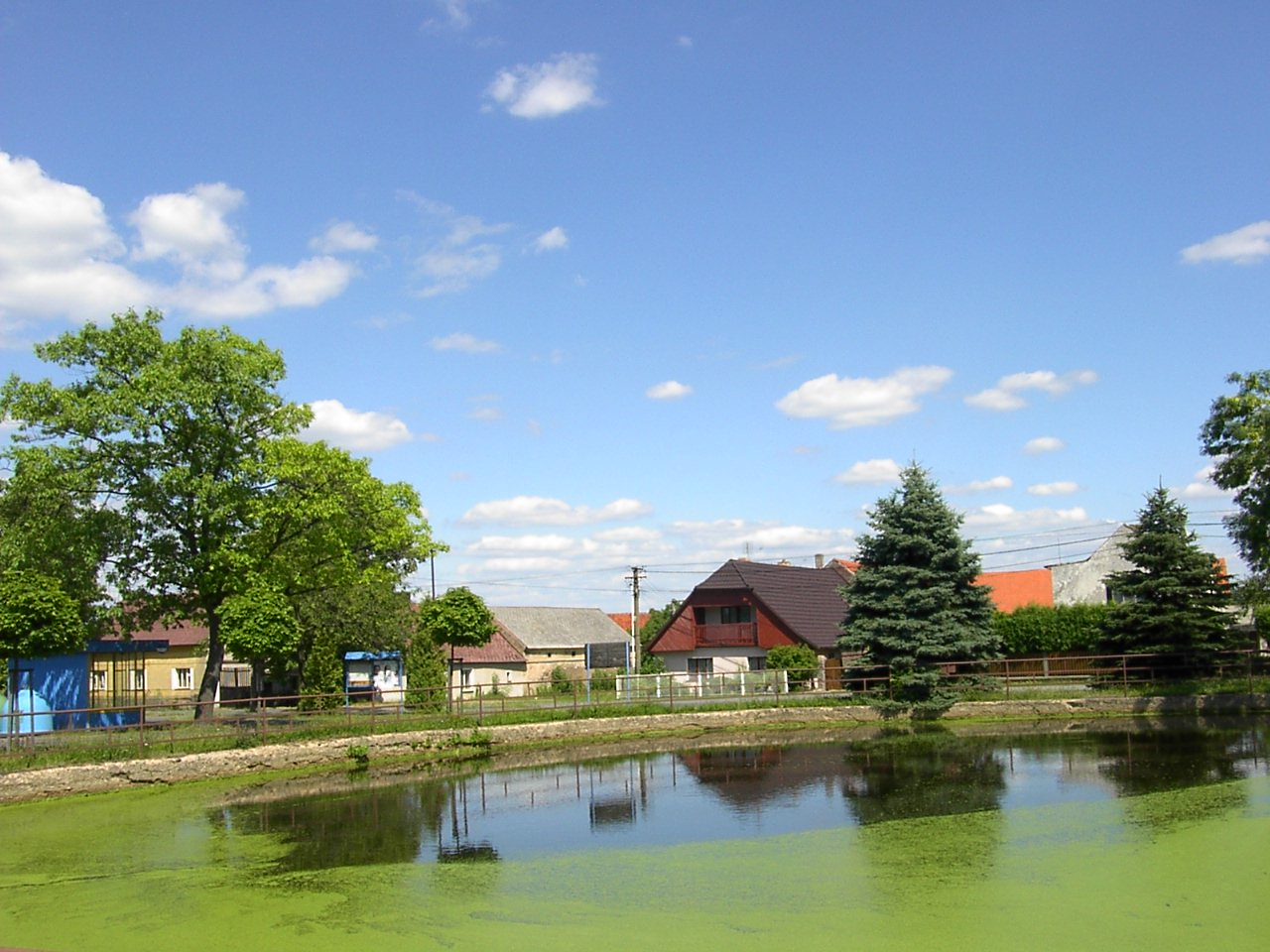
- Centre of Sirá

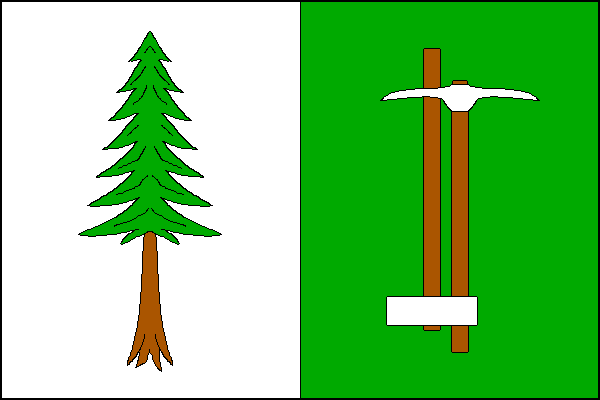
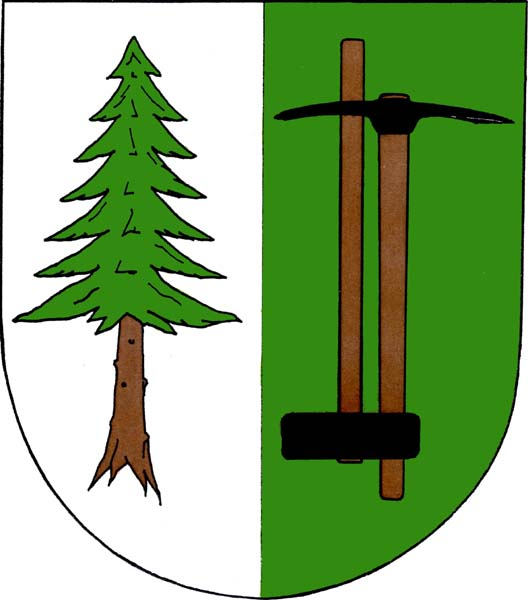
- Flag Coat of arms

- Location in the Czech Republic
- Coordinates: 49°49′18″N 13°44′19″E
- Country: Czech Republic
- Region: Plzeň
- District: Rokycany
- First mentioned: 1462

Area
  - Total: 6.43 km^{2} (2.48 sq mi)
- Elevation: 497 m (1,631 ft)

Population (2026-01-01)
  - Total: 149
  - Density: 23.2/km^{2} (60.0/sq mi)
- Time zone: UTC+1 (CET)
  - Summer (DST): UTC+2 (CEST)
- Postal code: 337 01
- Website: www.obec-sira.cz

Sirá is a municipality and village in Rokycany District in the Plzeň Region of the Czech Republic. It has about 100 inhabitants.

Sirá lies approximately 14 kilometres (9 mi) north-east of Rokycany, 28 km (17 mi) east of Plzeň, and 58 km (36 mi) south-west of Prague.

== Demographics ==
Historical population
Year	Pop.	±%
1869	264	—
1880	257	−2.7%
1890	226	−12.1%
1900	207	−8.4%
1910	228	+10.1%
1921	221	−3.1%
1930	231	+4.5%
1950	196	−15.2%
1961	175	−10.7%
1970	157	−10.3%
1980	121	−22.9%
1991	96	−20.7%
2001	91	−5.2%
2011	120	+31.9%
2021	149	+24.2%
Source: Censuses
