= Rokycany District =

Rokycany District Okres Rokycany
- District
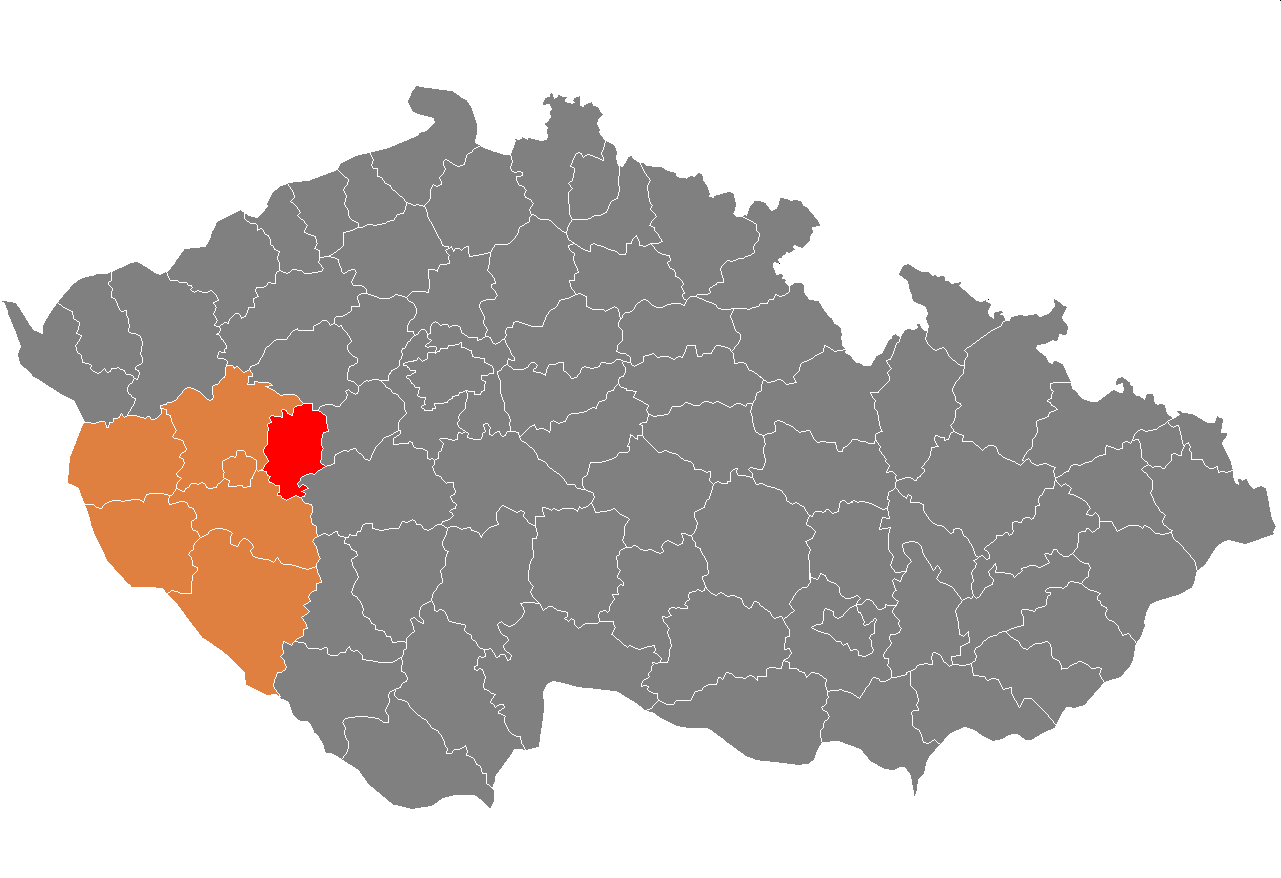
- Location in the Plzeň Region within the Czech Republic

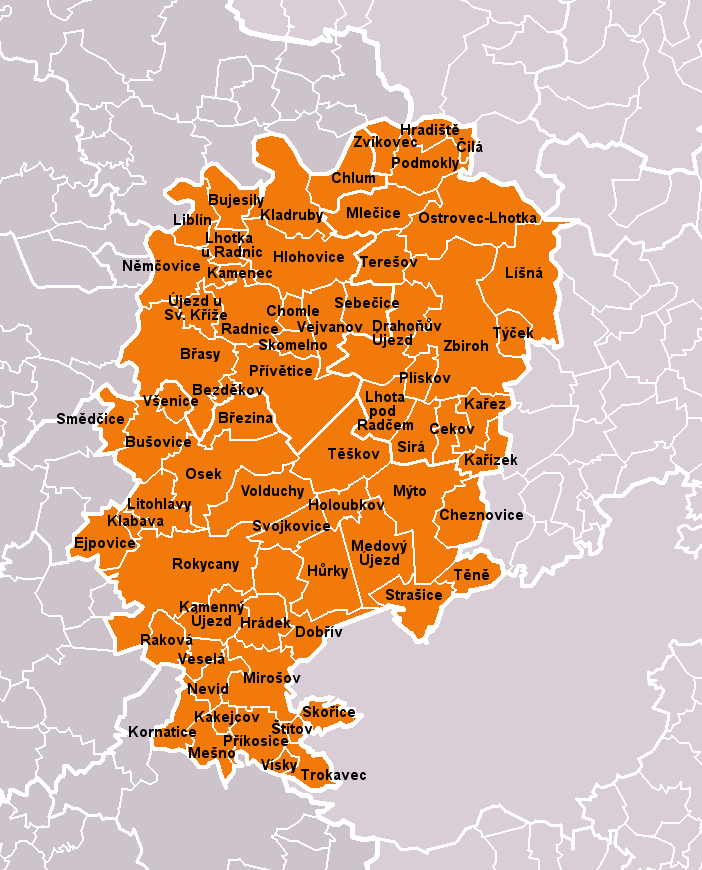
- Coordinates: 49°48′N 13°41′E
- Country: Czech Republic
- Region: Plzeň
- Capital: Rokycany

Area
  - Total: 656.62 km^{2} (253.52 sq mi)

Population (2026)
  - Total: 50,770
  - Density: 77.32/km^{2} (200.3/sq mi)
- Time zone: UTC+1 (CET)
  - Summer (DST): UTC+2 (CEST)
- Municipalities: 68
- * Towns: 6
- * Market towns: 2

Rokycany District (Czech: okres Rokycany) is a district in the Plzeň Region of the Czech Republic. Its capital is the town of Rokycany.

== Administrative division ==
Rokycany District is formed by only one administrative district of municipality with extended competence: Rokycany.

=== List of municipalities ===
Towns are marked in bold and market towns in italics:

Bezděkov - Břasy - Březina - Bujesily - Bušovice - Cekov - Cheznovice - Chlum - Chomle - Čilá - Dobřív - Drahoňův Újezd - Ejpovice - Hlohovice - Holoubkov - Hrádek - Hradiště - Hůrky - Kakejcov - Kamenec - Kamenný Újezd - Kařez - Kařízek - Klabava - Kladruby - Kornatice - Lhota pod Radčem - Lhotka u Radnic - Liblín - Líšná - Litohlavy - Medový Újezd - Mešno - Mirošov - Mlečice - Mýto - Němčovice - Nevid - Osek - Ostrovec-Lhotka - Plískov - Podmokly - Příkosice - Přívětice - Radnice - Raková - Rokycany - Sebečice - Sirá - Skomelno - Skořice - Smědčice - Štítov - Strašice - Svojkovice - Těně - Terešov - Těškov - Trokavec - Týček - Újezd u Svatého Kříže - Vejvanov - Veselá - Vísky - Volduchy - Všenice - Zbiroh - Zvíkovec

== Geography ==
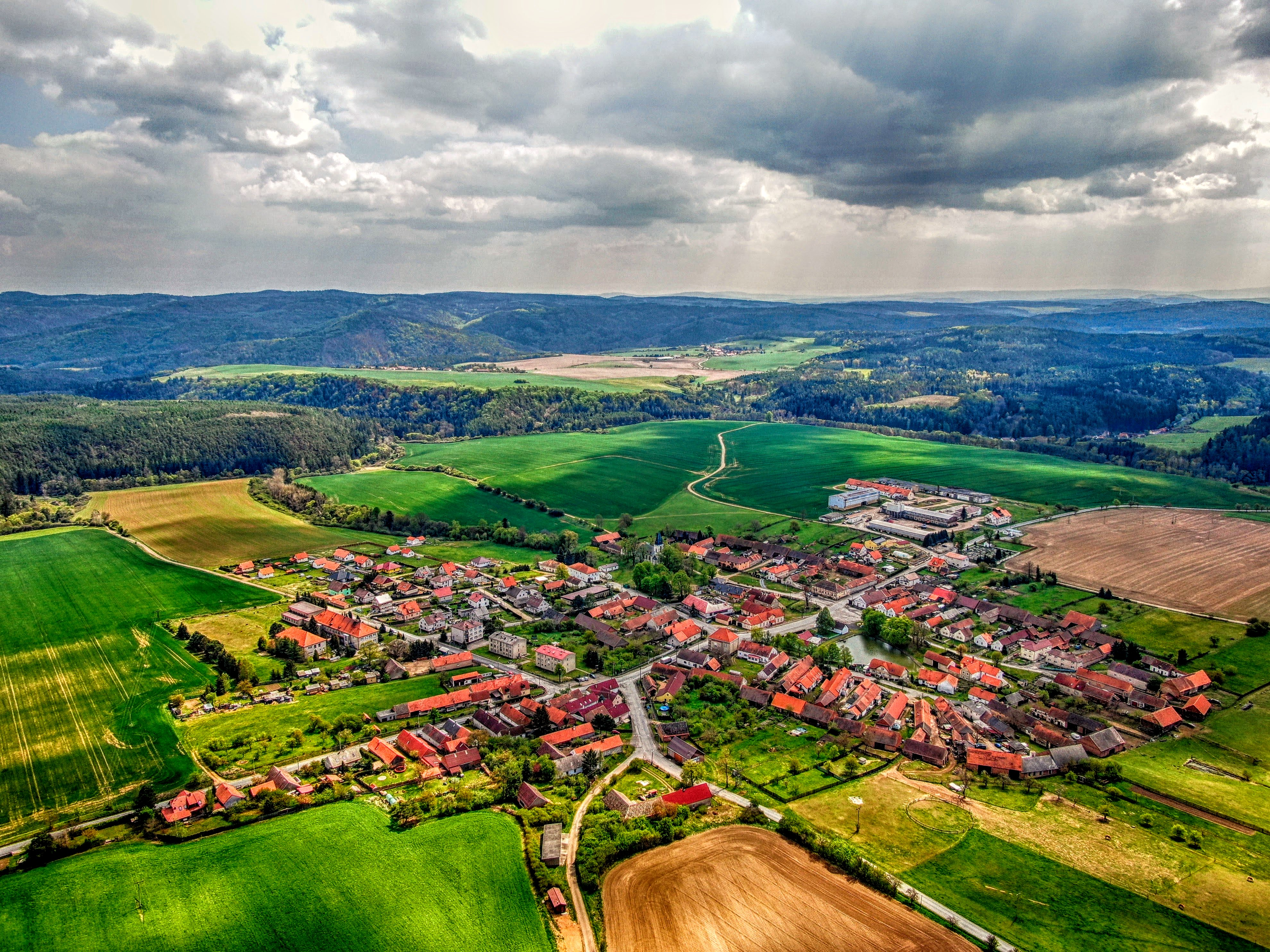
Mlečice and surrounding landscape

The terrain is hilly, most of the territory has the character of highlands. The territory extends into five geomorphological mesoregions: Křivoklát Highlands (centre and northeast), Plasy Uplands (northwest), Švihov Highlands (southwest), Brdy Highlands (southeast) and Hořovice Uplands (small part in the east). The highest point of the district is the western peak of the mountain Koruna in Těně with an elevation of 832 m (2,730 ft), the lowest point is the river bed of the Berounka in Čilá at 255 m (837 ft).

From the total district area of 656.6 km^{2} (253.5 sq mi), agricultural land occupies 266.0 km^{2} (102.7 sq mi), forests occupy 321.0 km^{2} (123.9 sq mi), and water area occupies 10.3 km^{2} (4.0 sq mi). Forests cover 48.9% of the district's area.

The Berounka forms large part of the district border in west and north. There are no significant rivers inside the district. The longest river is the Klabava, a tributary of the Berounka. The largest body of water is the fishpond Hořejší padrťský rybník with an area of 78.8 ha (195 acres).

There are two protected landscape areas: Brdy and Křivoklátsko.

== Demographics ==
As of 2026, Rokycany District is the second least populous district in the country.

Historical population

Year	Pop.	±%
1869	55,274	—
1880	58,284	+5.4%
1890	57,091	−2.0%
1900	55,382	−3.0%
1910	54,406	−1.8%

Year	Pop.	±%
1921	53,468	−1.7%
1930	53,474	+0.0%
1950	46,958	−12.2%
1961	50,550	+7.6%
1970	48,831	−3.4%

Year	Pop.	±%
1980	48,132	−1.4%
1991	46,118	−4.2%
2001	45,820	−0.6%
2011	47,477	+3.6%
2021	48,809	+2.8%

Source: Censuses

=== Most populous municipalities ===
Name	Population	Area (km^{2})
Rokycany	14,248	31
Strašice	2,805	35
Hrádek	2,705	6
Zbiroh	2,500	32
Břasy	2,314	21
Mirošov	2,216	14
Radnice	1,829	11
Mýto	1,640	18
Holoubkov	1,454	4
Osek	1,448	18

== Economy ==
The largest employers with headquarters in Rokycany District and at least 500 employees are:

Economic entity	Location	Number of employees	Main activity
Geis CZ	Ejpovice	500–999	Transportation support activities
SBS "IVA" J&J	Mýto	500–999	Private security activities
Hutchinson	Rokycany	500–999	Manufacture of rubber products
Refrigeration Solutions Czech Republic	Rokycany	500–999	Manufacture of non-domestic cooling and ventilation equipment
Duvenbeck Logistik	Volduchy	500–999	Freight transport by road

== Transport ==
The D5 motorway (part of the European route E50) from Prague to Plzeň and the Czech–German border runs through the district.

== Sights ==
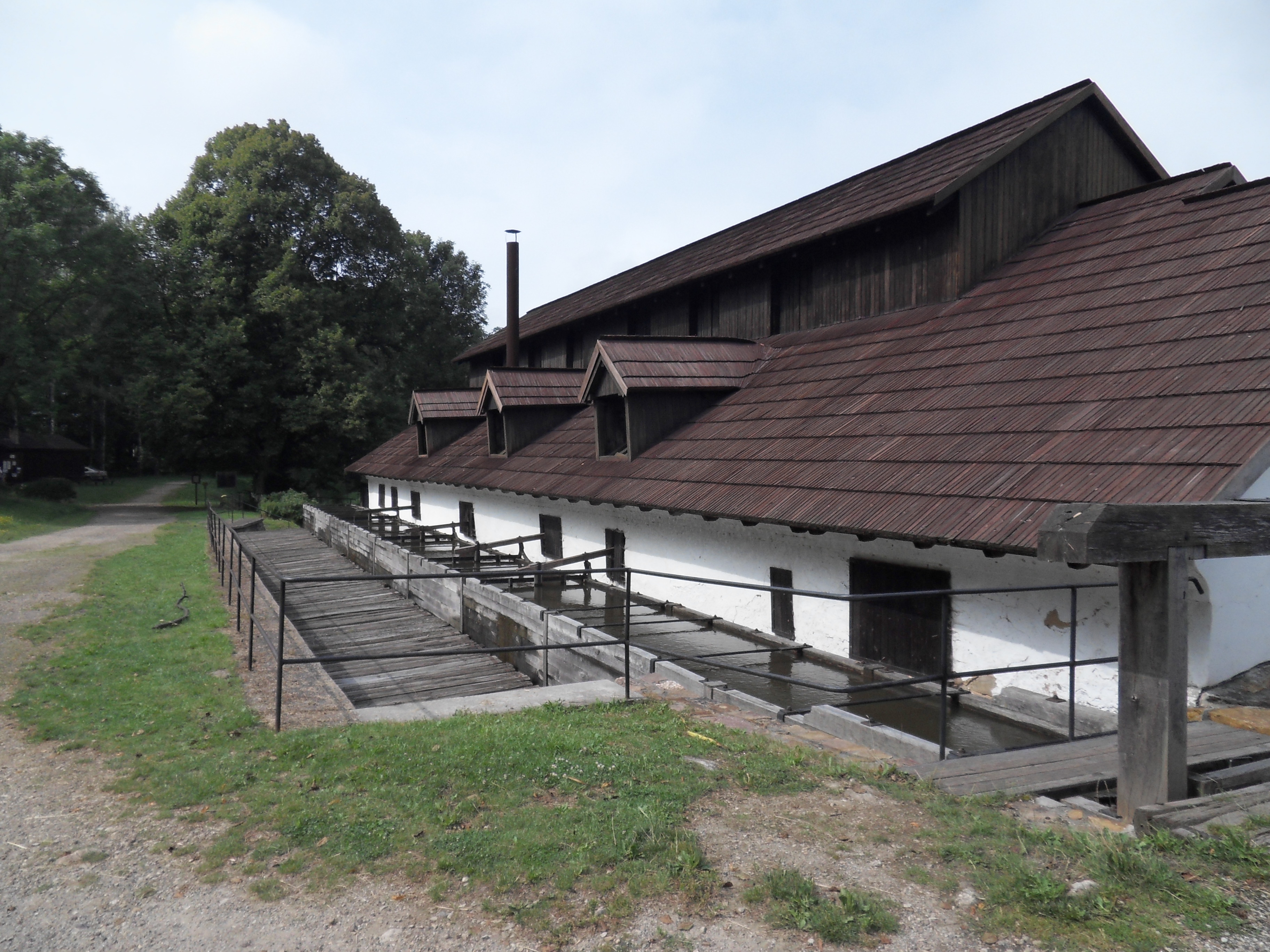
Hammer Mill at Dobřív

The most important monument in the district and the only one protected as a national cultural monument is the Hammer Mill at Dobřív.

The best-preserved settlements, protected as monument reservations and monument zones, are:

- Ostrovec (monument reservation)
- Rokycany
- Dobřív
- Jablečno
- Lhota pod Radčem
- Podmokly
- Vejvanov

The most visited tourist destination is the Zbiroh Castle in Zbiroh.
