= Těškov =

- Municipality
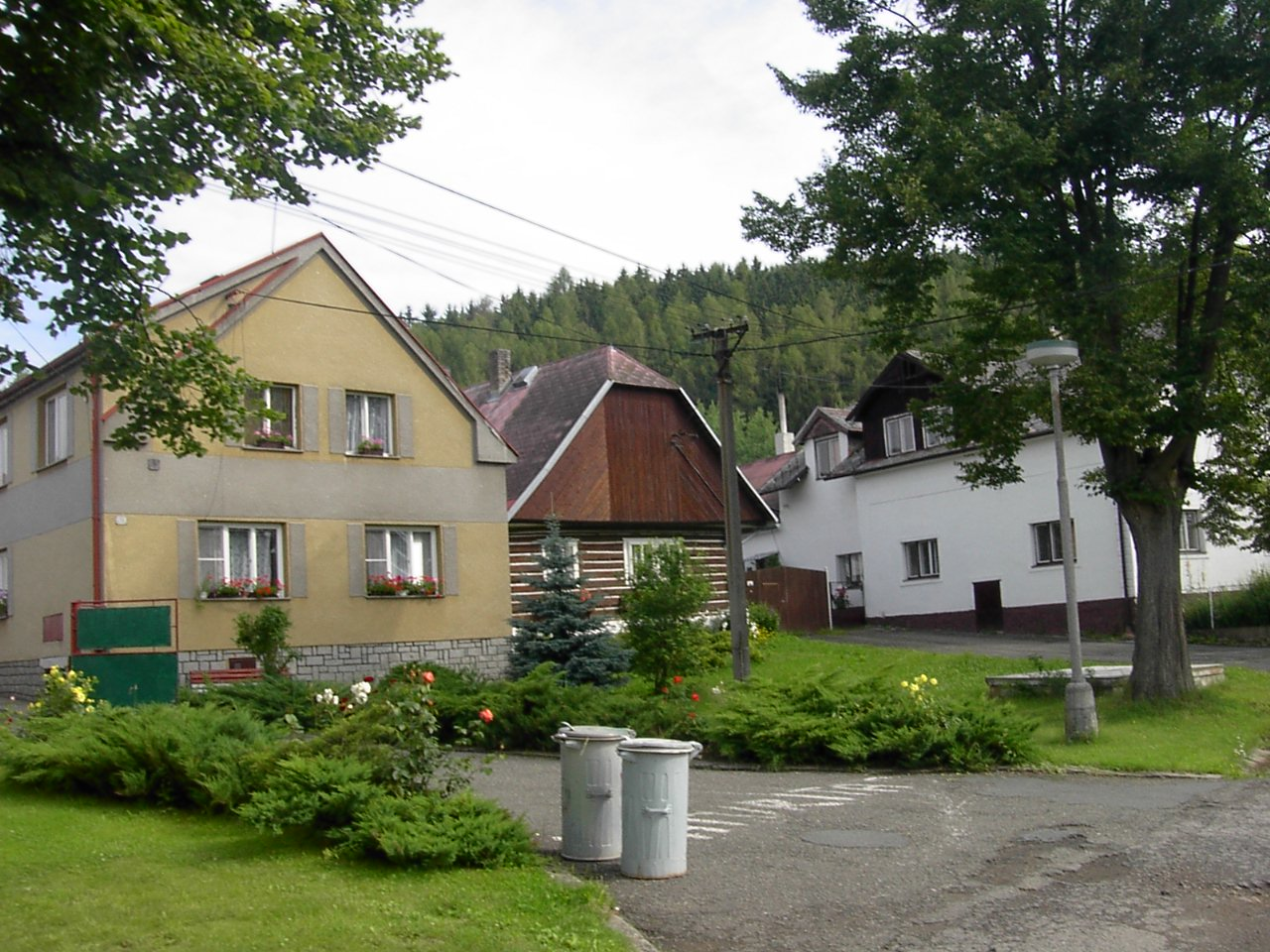
- Centre of Těškov

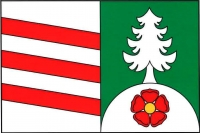
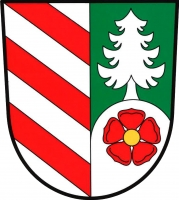
- Flag Coat of arms

- Location in the Czech Republic
- Coordinates: 49°48′8″N 13°41′53″E
- Country: Czech Republic
- Region: Plzeň
- District: Rokycany
- First mentioned: 1343

Area
  - Total: 14.17 km^{2} (5.47 sq mi)
- Elevation: 500 m (1,600 ft)

Population (2026-01-01)
  - Total: 322
  - Density: 22.7/km^{2} (58.9/sq mi)
- Time zone: UTC+1 (CET)
  - Summer (DST): UTC+2 (CEST)
- Postal code: 337 01
- Website: www.obec-teskov.cz

Těškov is a municipality and village in Rokycany District in the Plzeň Region of the Czech Republic. It has about 300 inhabitants.

== Etymology ==
The name is derived from the personal name Těšek, meaning "Těšek's (court)".

== Geography ==
Těškov is located about 10 kilometres (6 mi) northeast of Rokycany and 22 km (14 mi) northeast of Plzeň. It lies in the Křivoklát Highlands. The highest point is the hill Hrad at 680 m (2,231 ft) above sea level.

== History ==
The first written mention of Těškov is from 1343.

== Demographics ==
Historical population

| Year | Pop. | ±% |
|---|---|---|
| 1869 | 719 | — |
| 1880 | 671 | −6.7% |
| 1890 | 672 | +0.1% |
| 1900 | 730 | +8.6% |
| 1910 | 778 | +6.6% |

| Year | Pop. | ±% |
|---|---|---|
| 1921 | 739 | −5.0% |
| 1930 | 708 | −4.2% |
| 1950 | 510 | −28.0% |
| 1961 | 442 | −13.3% |
| 1970 | 392 | −11.3% |

| Year | Pop. | ±% |
|---|---|---|
| 1980 | 347 | −11.5% |
| 1991 | 306 | −11.8% |
| 2001 | 298 | −2.6% |
| 2011 | 305 | +2.3% |
| 2021 | 329 | +7.9% |

Source: Censuses

== Transport ==
There are no railways or major roads passing through the municipality. The D5 motorway from Prague to Plzeň runs along the southern municipal border just outside the municipality.

== Sights ==
The main landmark of Těškov is a well-preserved timbered polygonal chapel. It dates from the turn of the 18th and 19th centuries.
