= Kařízek =

- Municipality
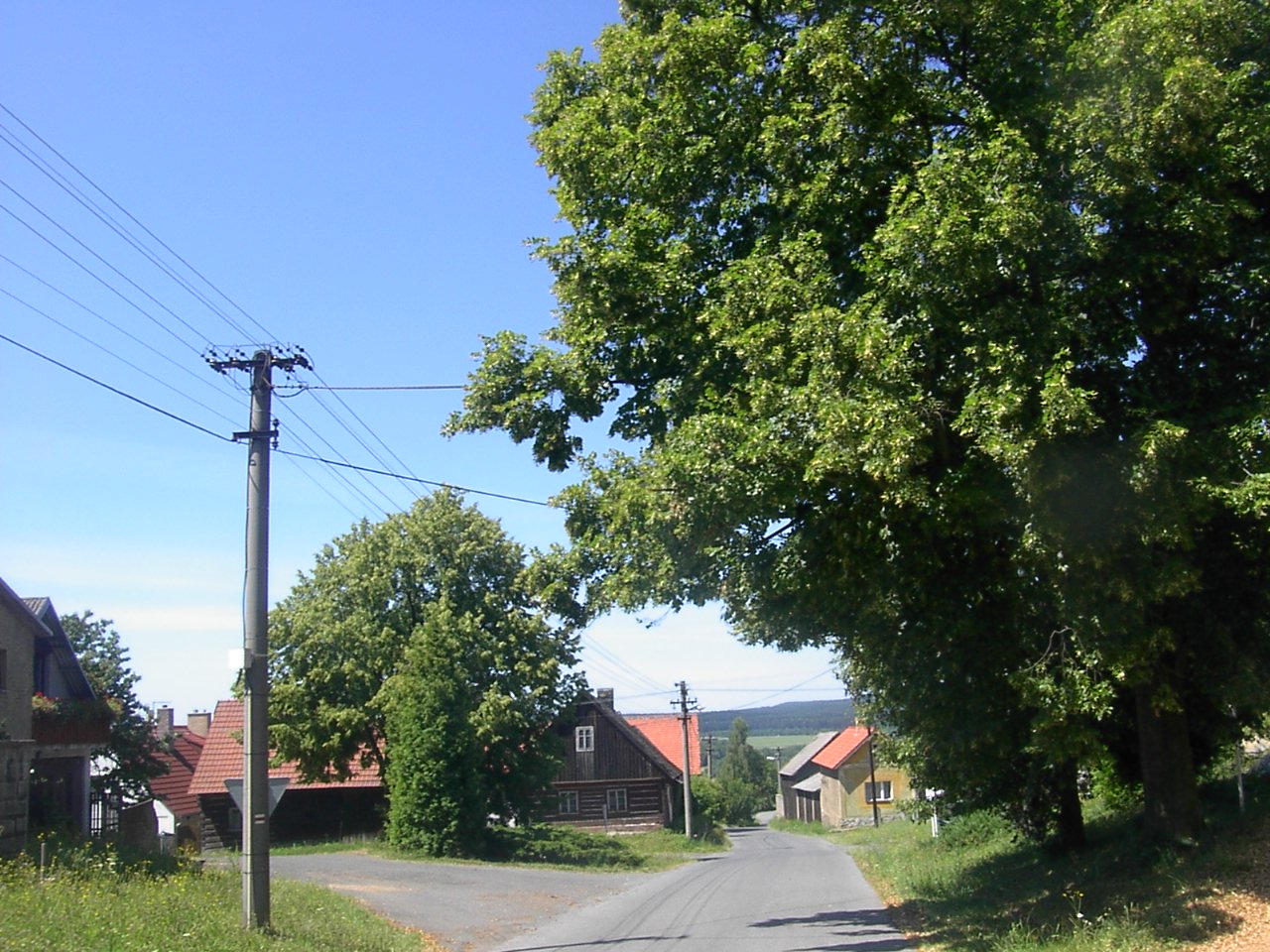
- Main street

- Location in the Czech Republic
- Coordinates: 49°48′48″N 13°47′59″E
- Country: Czech Republic
- Region: Plzeň
- District: Rokycany
- First mentioned: 1398

Area
  - Total: 4.45 km^{2} (1.72 sq mi)
- Elevation: 508 m (1,667 ft)

Population (2026-01-01)
  - Total: 54
  - Density: 12/km^{2} (31/sq mi)
- Time zone: UTC+1 (CET)
  - Summer (DST): UTC+2 (CEST)
- Postal code: 338 08
- Website: www.karizek.cz

Kařízek is a municipality and village in Rokycany District in the Plzeň Region of the Czech Republic. It has about 50 inhabitants.

Kařízek lies approximately 18 kilometres (11 mi) north-east of Rokycany, 32 km (20 mi) east of Plzeň, and 54 km (34 mi) south-west of Prague.

== Demographics ==
Historical population
Year	Pop.	±%
1869	210	—
1880	216	+2.9%
1890	188	−13.0%
1900	186	−1.1%
1910	188	+1.1%
1921	218	+16.0%
1930	210	−3.7%
1950	208	−1.0%
1961	99	−52.4%
1970	98	−1.0%
1980	73	−25.5%
1991	51	−30.1%
2001	42	−17.6%
2011	46	+9.5%
2021	56	+21.7%
Source: Censuses

== Transport ==
Kařížek is served by the Kařízek station on the regional railway line Plzeň–Beroun. However, this station is located just beyond the municipal border.
