= Lhota pod Radčem =

- Municipality
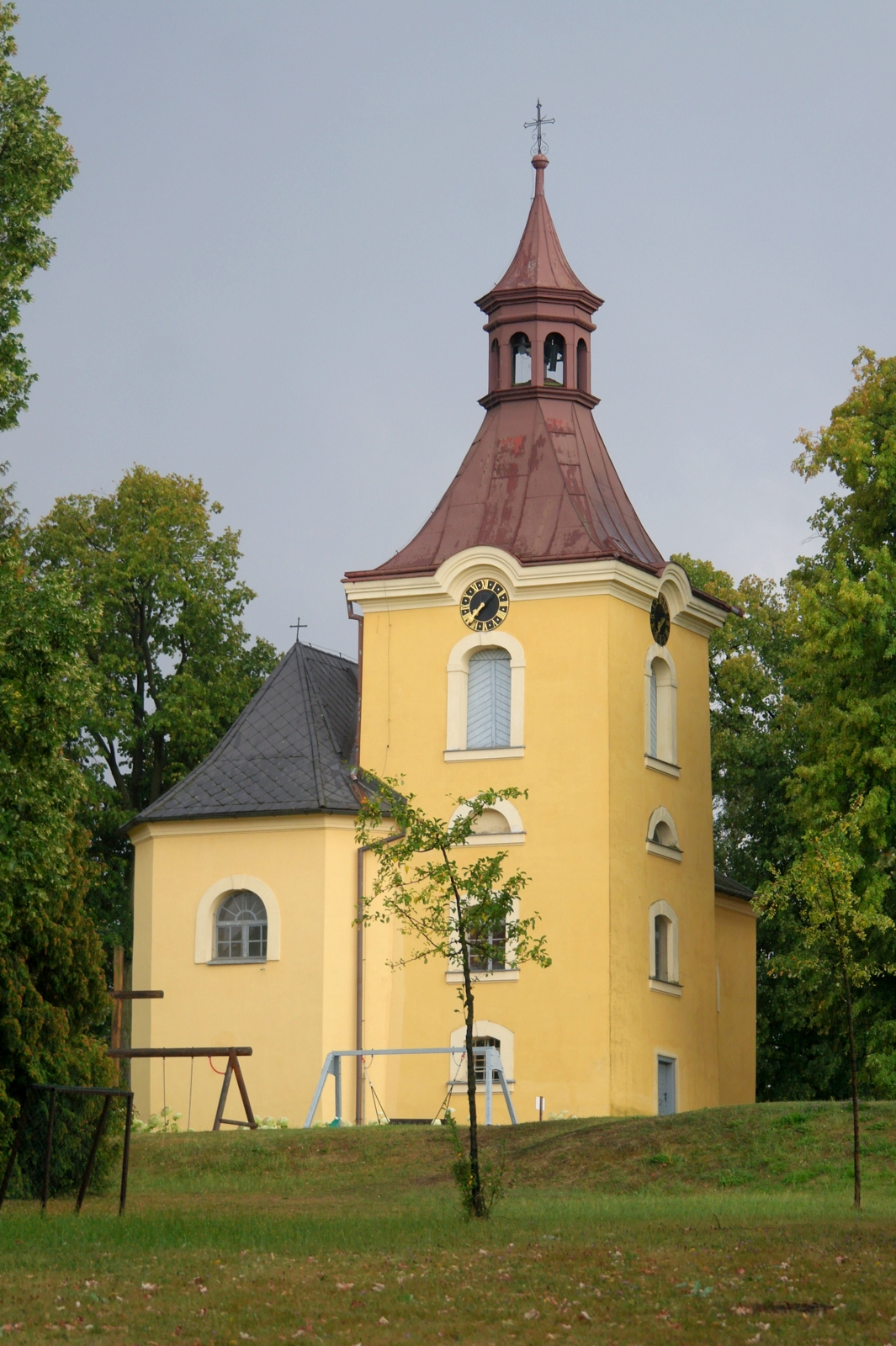
- Church of Saints Philip and James

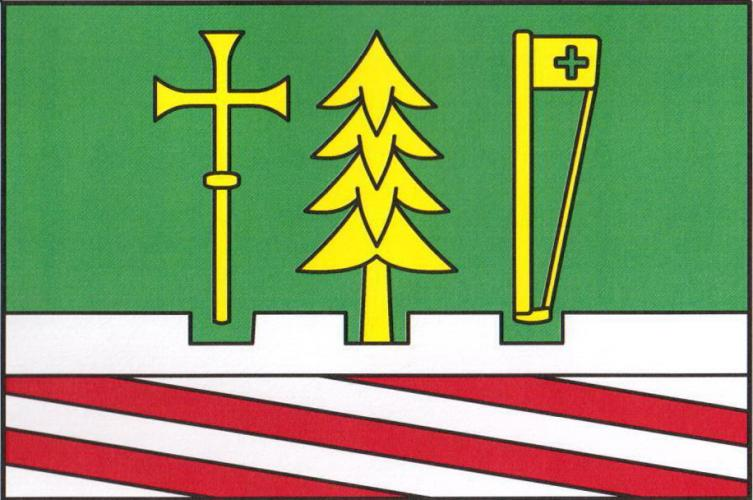
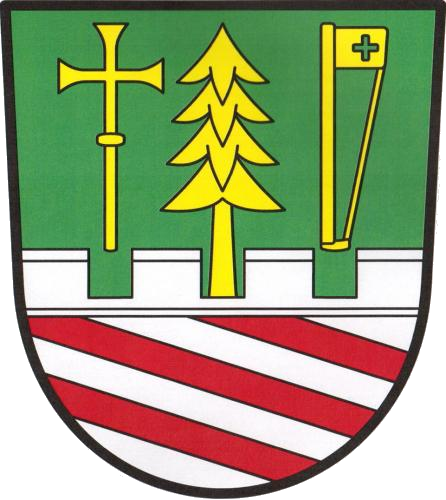
- Flag Coat of arms

- Location in the Czech Republic
- Coordinates: 49°49′39″N 13°42′39″E
- Country: Czech Republic
- Region: Plzeň
- District: Rokycany
- First mentioned: 1352

Area
  - Total: 7.38 km^{2} (2.85 sq mi)
- Elevation: 498 m (1,634 ft)

Population (2026-01-01)
  - Total: 342
  - Density: 46.3/km^{2} (120/sq mi)
- Time zone: UTC+1 (CET)
  - Summer (DST): UTC+2 (CEST)
- Postal code: 337 01
- Website: www.lhotapodradcem.cz

Lhota pod Radčem is a municipality and village in Rokycany District in the Plzeň Region of the Czech Republic. It has about 300 inhabitants. The folk architecture in the centre of the village is well preserved and is protected as a village monument zone.

Lhota pod Radčem lies approximately 13 kilometres (8 mi) north-east of Rokycany, 26 km (16 mi) east of Plzeň, and 59 km (37 mi) south-west of Prague.

== Demographics ==
Historical population
Year	Pop.	±%
1869	848	—
1880	782	−7.8%
1890	668	−14.6%
1900	640	−4.2%
1910	542	−15.3%
1921	513	−5.4%
1930	484	−5.7%
1950	383	−20.9%
1961	380	−0.8%
1970	344	−9.5%
1980	273	−20.6%
1991	249	−8.8%
2001	267	+7.2%
2011	321	+20.2%
2021	320	−0.3%
Source: Censuses
