= Hlohovice =

- Municipality
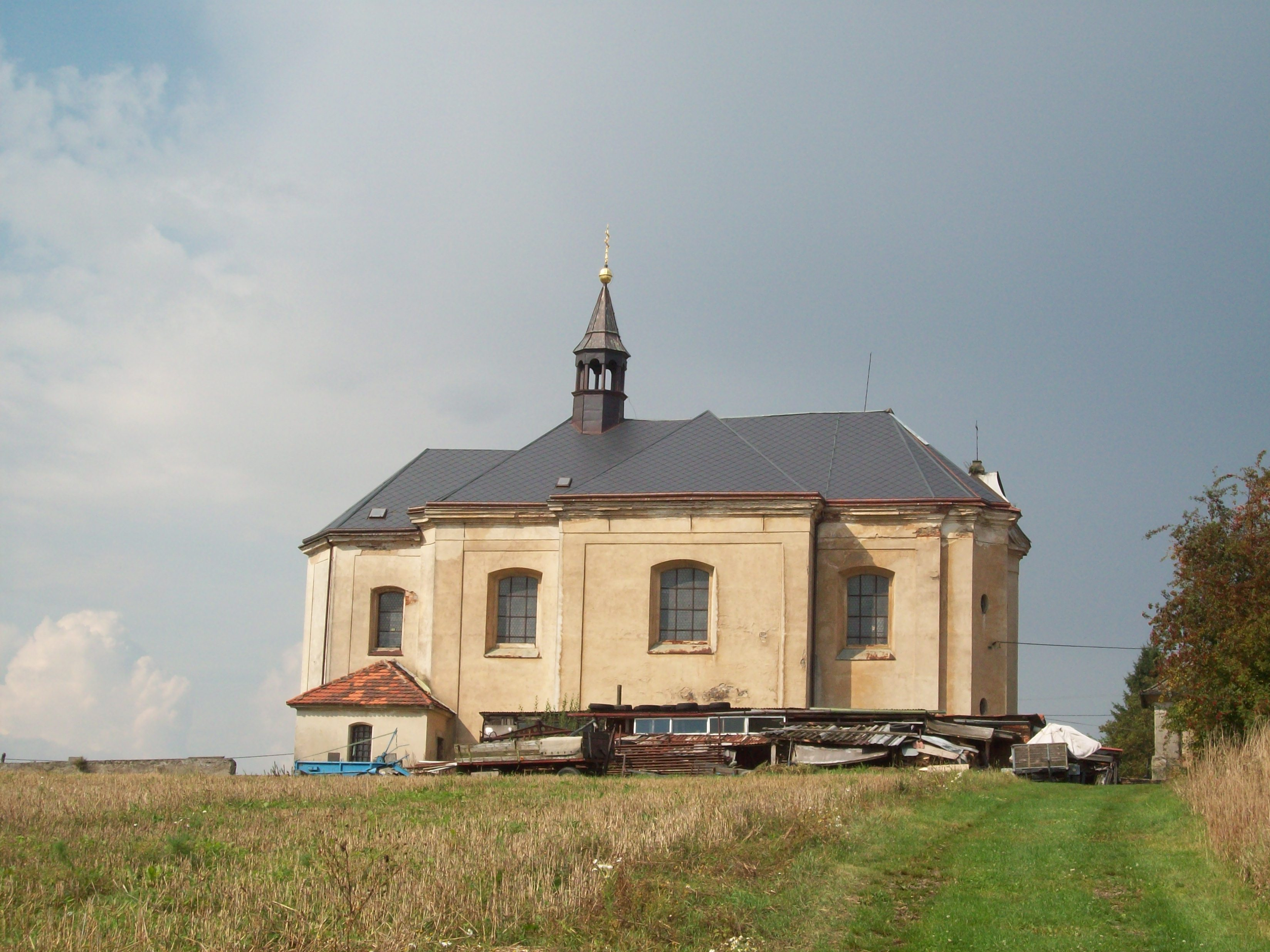
- Church of the Holy Trinity

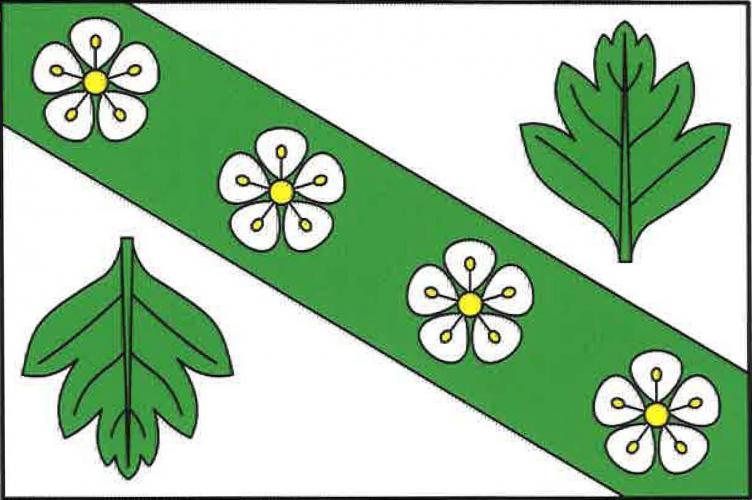
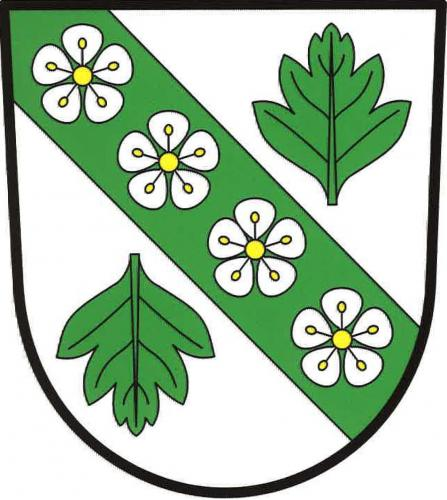
- Flag Coat of arms

- Location in the Czech Republic
- Coordinates: 49°53′22″N 13°38′36″E
- Country: Czech Republic
- Region: Plzeň
- District: Rokycany
- First mentioned: 1374

Area
  - Total: 18.11 km^{2} (6.99 sq mi)
- Elevation: 432 m (1,417 ft)

Population (2026-01-01)
  - Total: 350
  - Density: 19/km^{2} (50/sq mi)
- Time zone: UTC+1 (CET)
  - Summer (DST): UTC+2 (CEST)
- Postal code: 338 08
- Website: www.hlohovice.cz

Hlohovice (German: Groß Lochovitz) is a municipality and village in Rokycany District in the Plzeň Region of the Czech Republic. It has about 400 inhabitants.

Hlohovice lies approximately 17 kilometres (11 mi) north of Rokycany, 26 km (16 mi) north-east of Plzeň, and 60 km (37 mi) west of Prague.

== Administrative division ==
Hlohovice consists of four municipal parts (in brackets population according to the 2021 census):

- Hlohovice (140)
- Hlohovičky (66)
- Mostiště (44)
- Svinná (46)

== Demographics ==
Historical population
Year	Pop.	±%
1869	1,364	—
1880	1,265	−7.3%
1890	1,193	−5.7%
1900	1,158	−2.9%
1910	1,111	−4.1%
1921	1,105	−0.5%
1930	1,040	−5.9%
1950	704	−32.3%
1961	605	−14.1%
1970	507	−16.2%
1980	437	−13.8%
1991	366	−16.2%
2001	327	−10.7%
2011	314	−4.0%
2021	296	−5.7%
Source: Censuses
