= Těně =

- Municipality
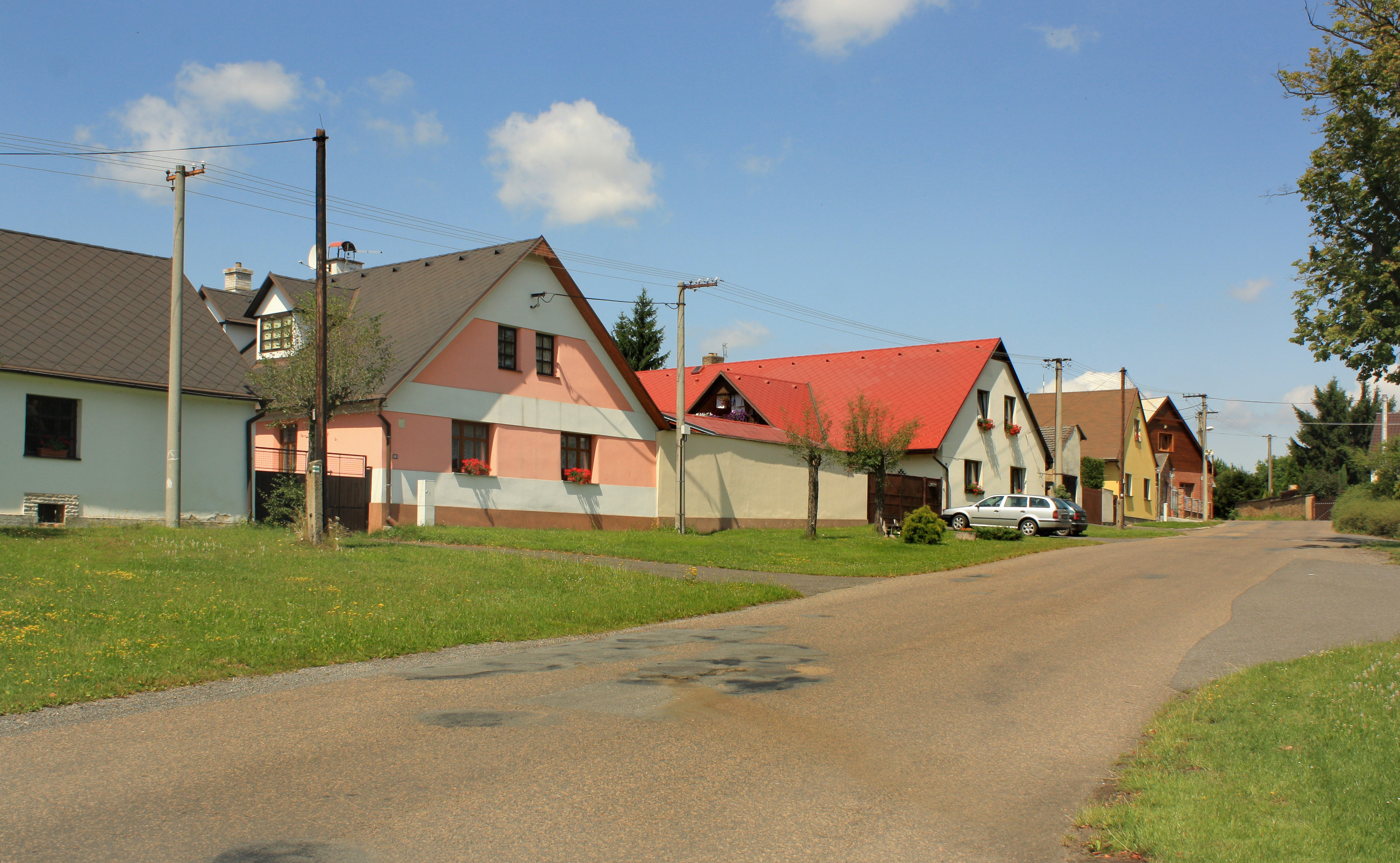
- Centre of Těně

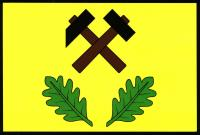
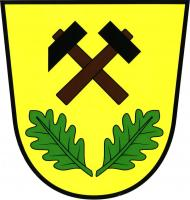
- Flag Coat of arms

- Location in the Czech Republic
- Coordinates: 49°45′5″N 13°47′46″E
- Country: Czech Republic
- Region: Plzeň
- District: Rokycany
- First mentioned: 1391

Area
  - Total: 20.78 km^{2} (8.02 sq mi)
- Elevation: 536 m (1,759 ft)

Population (2026-01-01)
  - Total: 308
  - Density: 14.8/km^{2} (38.4/sq mi)
- Time zone: UTC+1 (CET)
  - Summer (DST): UTC+2 (CEST)
- Postal code: 338 45
- Website: www.tene.cz

Těně is a municipality and village in Rokycany District in the Plzeň Region of the Czech Republic. It has about 300 inhabitants.

Těně lies approximately 15 kilometres (9 mi) east of Rokycany, 30 km (19 mi) east of Plzeň, and 59 km (37 mi) south-west of Prague.

== Demographics ==
Historical population
Year	Pop.	±%
1869	709	—
1880	611	−13.8%
1890	613	+0.3%
1900	571	−6.9%
1910	560	−1.9%
1921	506	−9.6%
1930	472	−6.7%
1950	341	−27.8%
1961	360	+5.6%
1970	316	−12.2%
1980	267	−15.5%
1991	242	−9.4%
2001	234	−3.3%
2011	262	+12.0%
2021	295	+12.6%
Source: Censuses
