= Vejvanov =

- Municipality
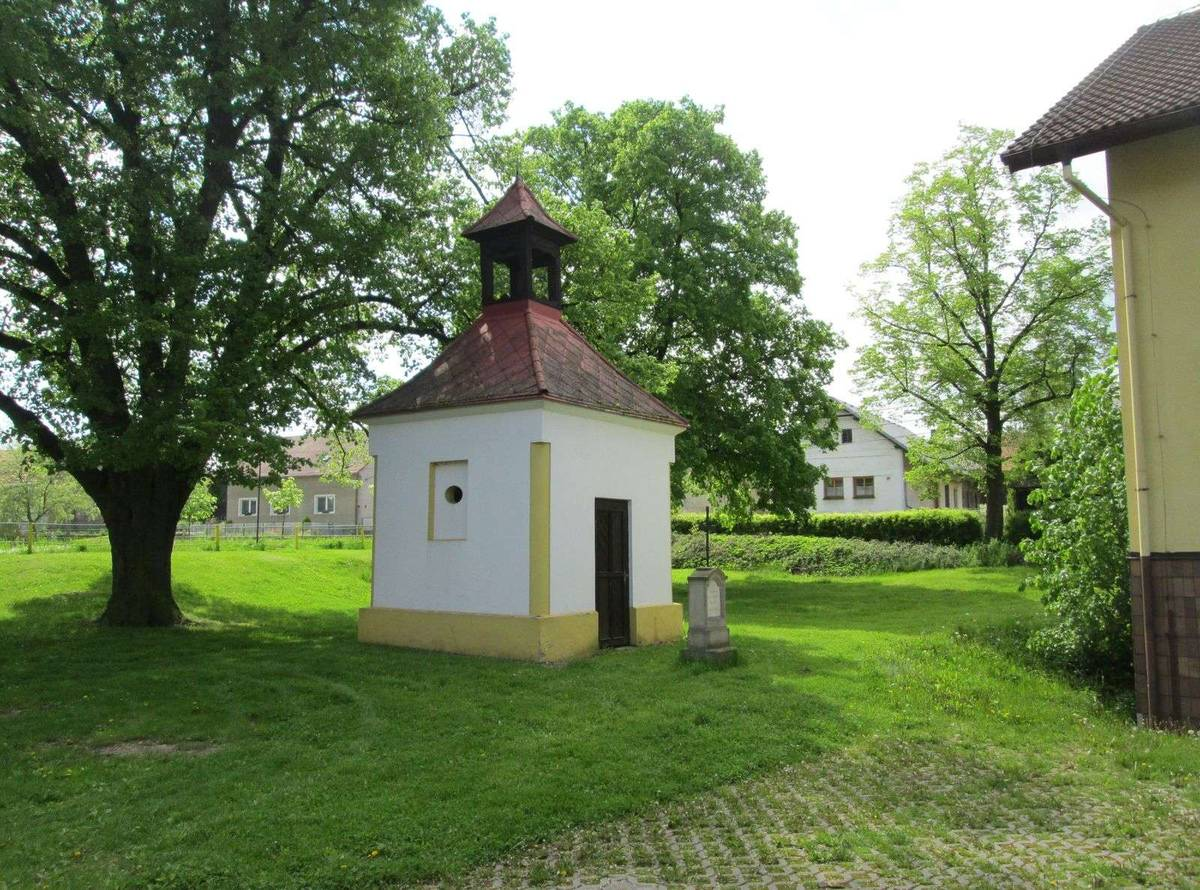
- Chapel in Vejvanov

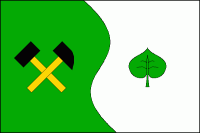
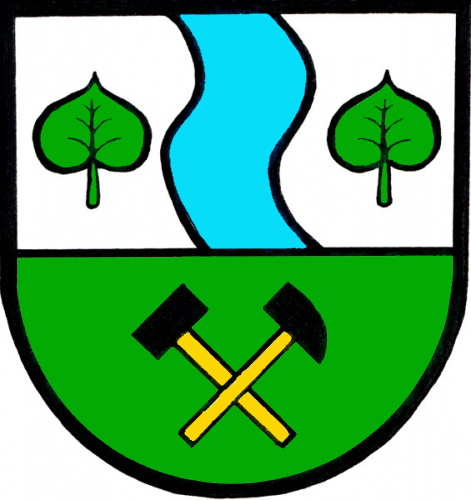
- Flag Coat of arms

- Location in the Czech Republic
- Coordinates: 49°52′8″N 13°39′9″E
- Country: Czech Republic
- Region: Plzeň
- District: Rokycany
- First mentioned: 1379

Area
  - Total: 7.86 km^{2} (3.03 sq mi)
- Elevation: 456 m (1,496 ft)

Population (2026-01-01)
  - Total: 254
  - Density: 32.3/km^{2} (83.7/sq mi)
- Time zone: UTC+1 (CET)
  - Summer (DST): UTC+2 (CEST)
- Postal code: 338 28
- Website: www.vejvanov.cz

Vejvanov is a municipality and village in Rokycany District in the Plzeň Region of the Czech Republic. It has about 300 inhabitants. The historic centre is well preserved and is protected as a village monument zone.

Vejvanov lies approximately 15 kilometres (9 mi) north of Rokycany, 25 km (16 mi) north-east of Plzeň, and 61 km (38 mi) south-west of Prague.

== Demographics ==
Historical population
| Year | Pop. | ±% |
|---|---|---|
| 1869 | 701 | — |
| 1880 | 649 | −7.4% |
| 1890 | 571 | −12.0% |
| 1900 | 537 | −6.0% |
| 1910 | 553 | +3.0% |
| 1921 | 523 | −5.4% |
| 1930 | 444 | −15.1% |
| 1950 | 413 | −7.0% |
| 1961 | 368 | −10.9% |
| 1970 | 292 | −20.7% |
| 1980 | 250 | −14.4% |
| 1991 | 218 | −12.8% |
| 2001 | 216 | −0.9% |
| 2011 | 240 | +11.1% |
| 2021 | 242 | +0.8% |
Source: Censuses
