= Skomelno =

- Municipality
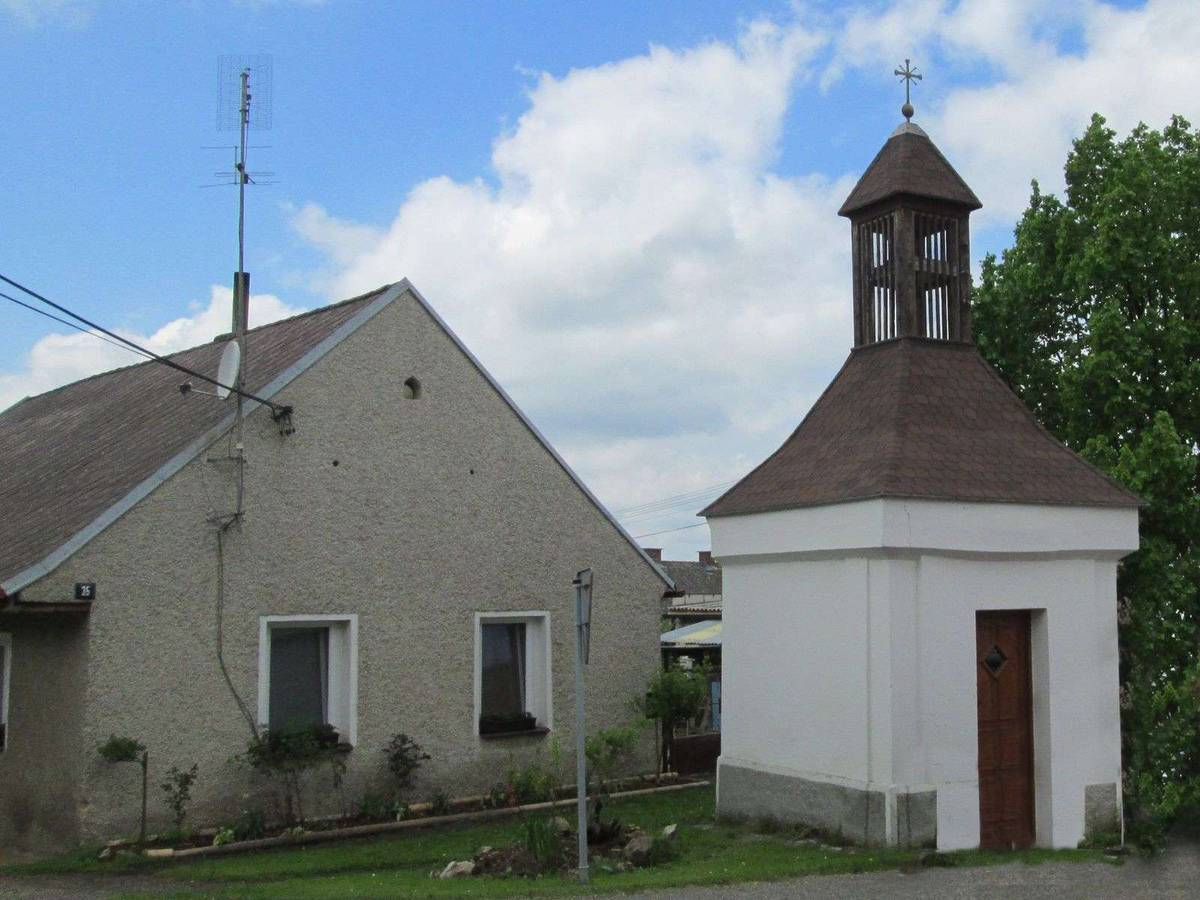
- Chapel in Skomelno

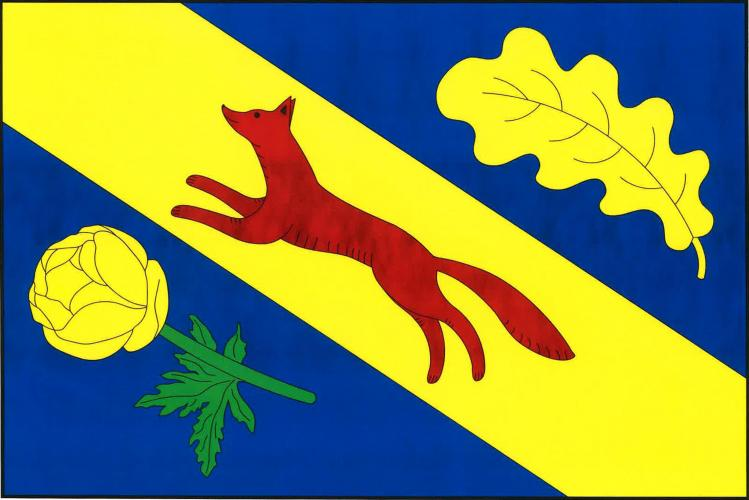
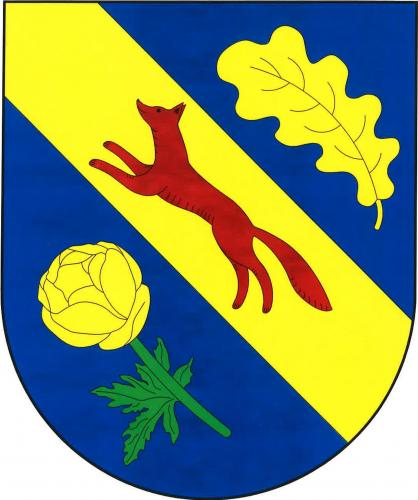
- Flag Coat of arms

- Location in the Czech Republic
- Coordinates: 49°50′51″N 13°38′32″E
- Country: Czech Republic
- Region: Plzeň
- District: Rokycany
- First mentioned: 1379

Area
  - Total: 2.88 km^{2} (1.11 sq mi)
- Elevation: 478 m (1,568 ft)

Population (2026-01-01)
  - Total: 217
  - Density: 75.3/km^{2} (195/sq mi)
- Time zone: UTC+1 (CET)
  - Summer (DST): UTC+2 (CEST)
- Postal code: 338 28
- Website: www.obec-skomelno.cz

Skomelno is a municipality and village in Rokycany District in the Plzeň Region of the Czech Republic. It has about 200 inhabitants.

Skomelno lies approximately 12 kilometres (7 mi) north of Rokycany, 23 km (14 mi) north-east of Plzeň, and 62 km (39 mi) south-west of Prague.

== Demographics ==
Historical population
Year	Pop.	±%
1869	476	—
1880	509	+6.9%
1890	485	−4.7%
1900	386	−20.4%
1910	411	+6.5%
1921	382	−7.1%
1930	393	+2.9%
1950	312	−20.6%
1961	268	−14.1%
1970	240	−10.4%
1980	178	−25.8%
1991	160	−10.1%
2001	140	−12.5%
2011	192	+37.1%
2021	200	+4.2%
Source: Censuses
