= Týček =

- Municipality
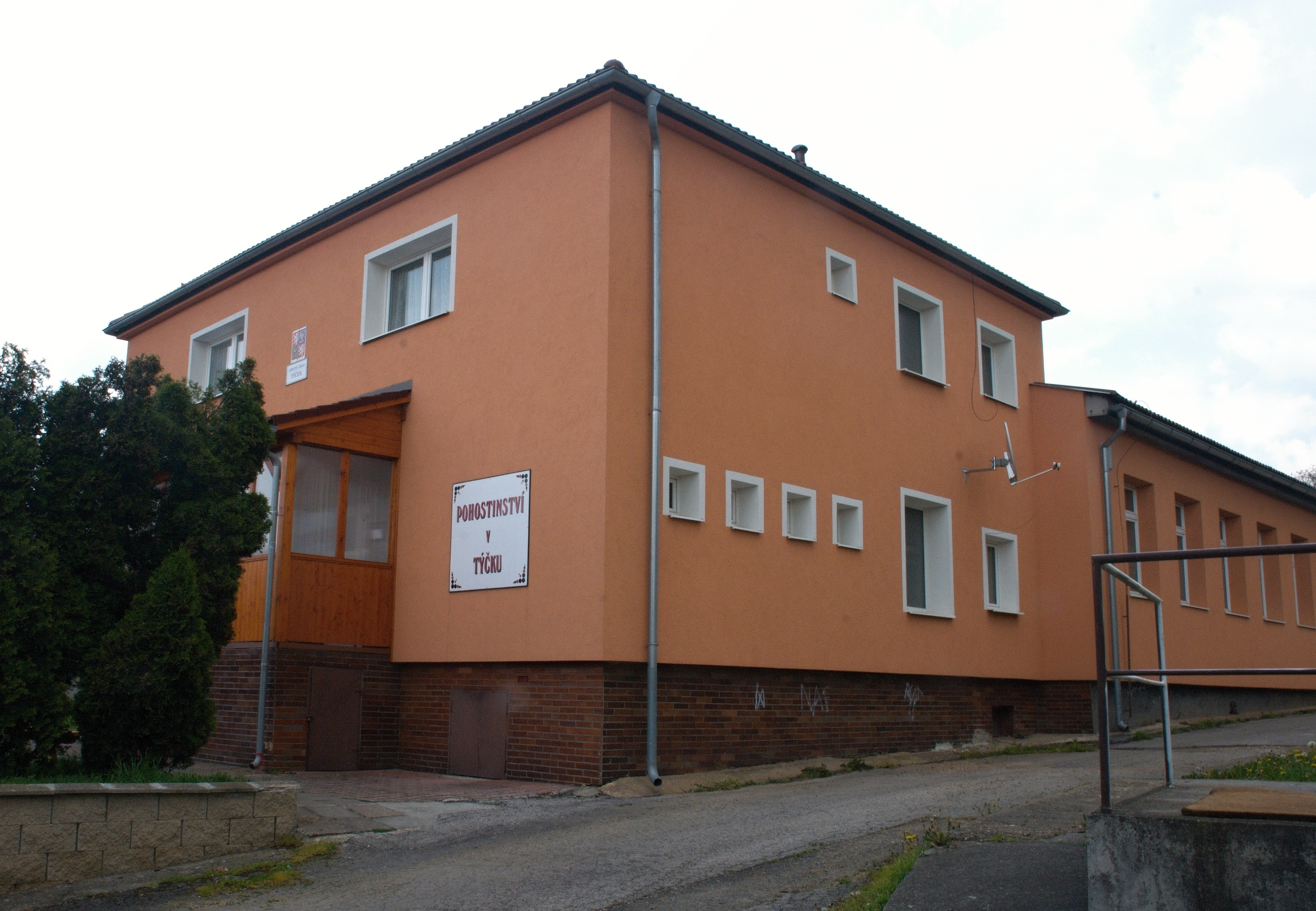
- Municipal office and pub

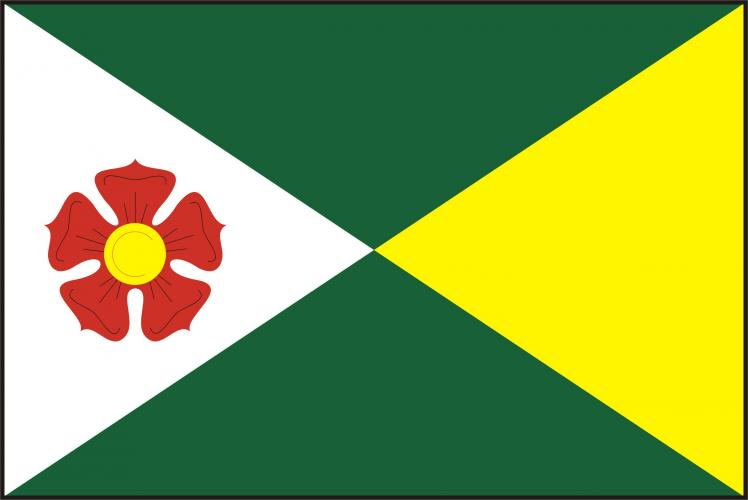
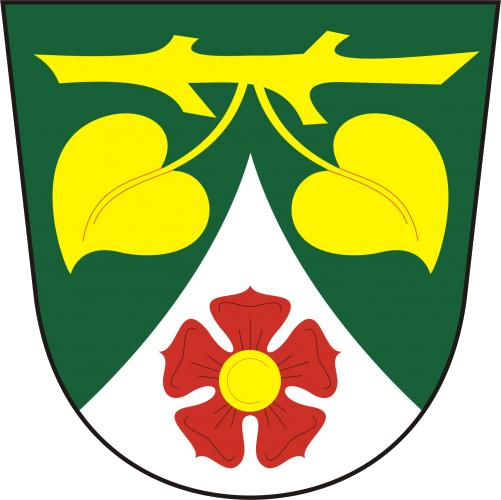
- Flag Coat of arms

- Location in the Czech Republic
- Coordinates: 49°52′10″N 13°47′40″E
- Country: Czech Republic
- Region: Plzeň
- District: Rokycany
- First mentioned: 1336

Area
  - Total: 3.67 km^{2} (1.42 sq mi)
- Elevation: 471 m (1,545 ft)

Population (2026-01-01)
  - Total: 262
  - Density: 71.4/km^{2} (185/sq mi)
- Time zone: UTC+1 (CET)
  - Summer (DST): UTC+2 (CEST)
- Postal code: 338 08
- Website: tycek.cz

Týček is a municipality and village in Rokycany District in the Plzeň Region of the Czech Republic. It has about 300 inhabitants.

Týček lies approximately 21 kilometres (13 mi) north-east of Rokycany, 34 km (21 mi) north-east of Plzeň, and 51 km (32 mi) south-west of Prague.

== Demographics ==
Historical population
| Year | Pop. | ±% |
|---|---|---|
| 1869 | 298 | — |
| 1880 | 320 | +7.4% |
| 1890 | 288 | −10.0% |
| 1900 | 308 | +6.9% |
| 1910 | 322 | +4.5% |
| 1921 | 323 | +0.3% |
| 1930 | 279 | −13.6% |
| 1950 | 254 | −9.0% |
| 1961 | 257 | +1.2% |
| 1970 | 249 | −3.1% |
| 1980 | 223 | −10.4% |
| 1991 | 229 | +2.7% |
| 2001 | 199 | −13.1% |
| 2011 | 199 | +0.0% |
| 2021 | 234 | +17.6% |
Source: Censuses
