= Cheznovice =

- Municipality
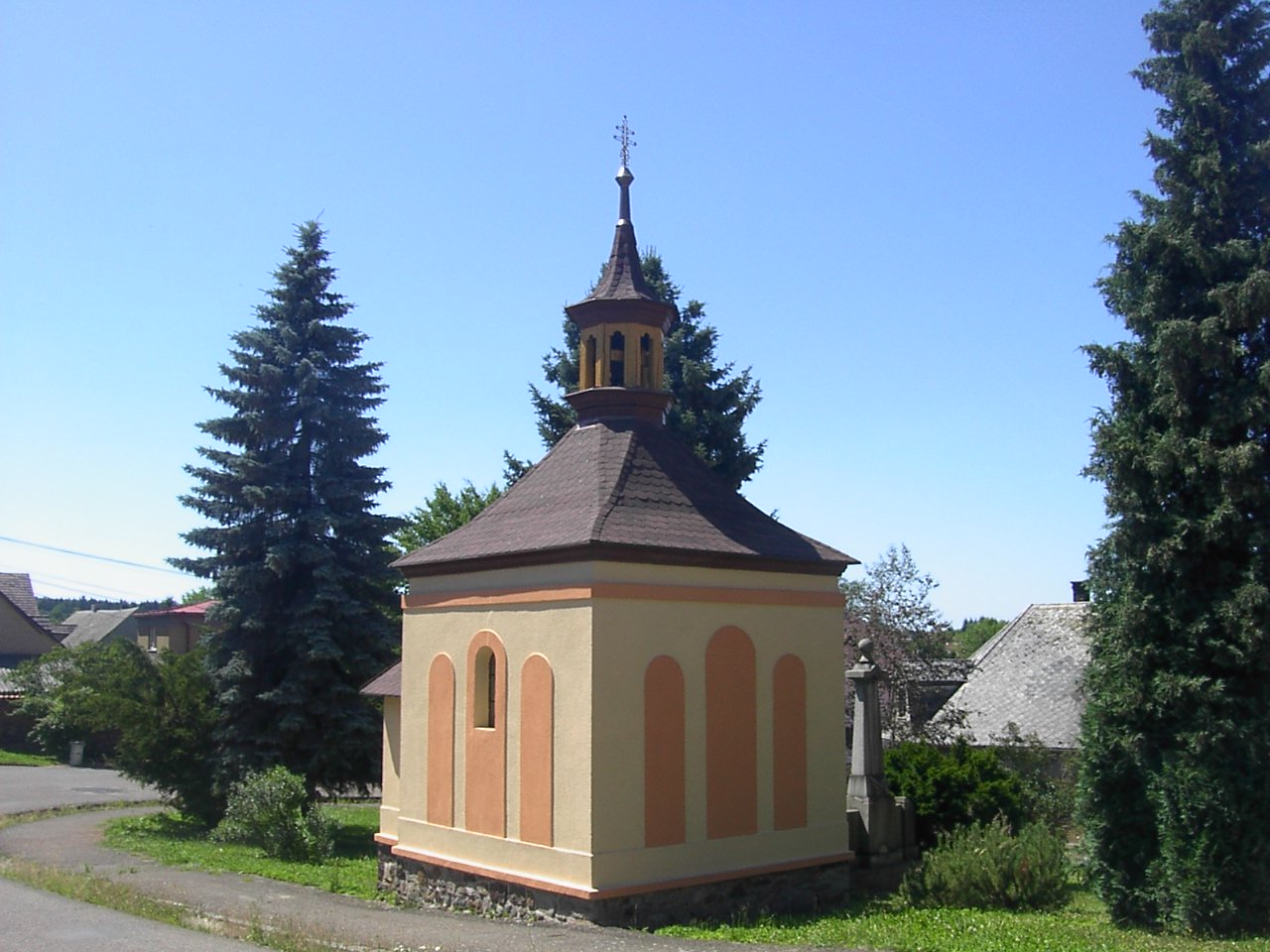
- Chapel in Cheznovice

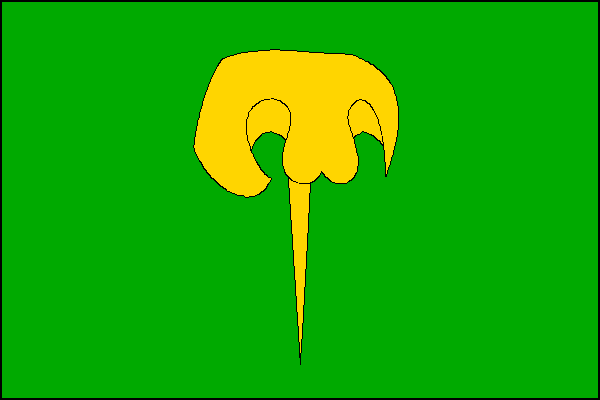
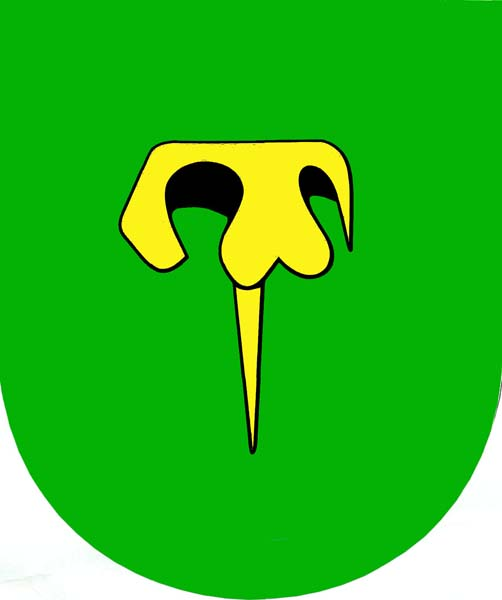
- Flag Coat of arms

- Location in the Czech Republic
- Coordinates: 49°46′44″N 13°47′8″E
- Country: Czech Republic
- Region: Plzeň
- District: Rokycany
- First mentioned: 1379

Area
  - Total: 7.78 km^{2} (3.00 sq mi)
- Elevation: 472 m (1,549 ft)

Population (2026-01-01)
  - Total: 780
  - Density: 100/km^{2} (260/sq mi)
- Time zone: UTC+1 (CET)
  - Summer (DST): UTC+2 (CEST)
- Postal code: 338 06
- Website: www.cheznovice.eu

Cheznovice is a municipality and village in Rokycany District in the Plzeň Region of the Czech Republic. It has about 800 inhabitants.

Cheznovice lies approximately 15 kilometres (9 mi) east of Rokycany, 30 km (19 mi) east of Plzeň, and 58 km (36 mi) south-west of Prague.

== Demographics ==
Historical population
Year	Pop.	±%
1869	804	—
1880	771	−4.1%
1890	802	+4.0%
1900	798	−0.5%
1910	825	+3.4%
1921	793	−3.9%
1930	875	+10.3%
1950	792	−9.5%
1961	829	+4.7%
1970	791	−4.6%
1980	795	+0.5%
1991	745	−6.3%
2001	702	−5.8%
2011	762	+8.5%
2021	713	−6.4%
Source: Censuses
