= Trokavec =

- Municipality
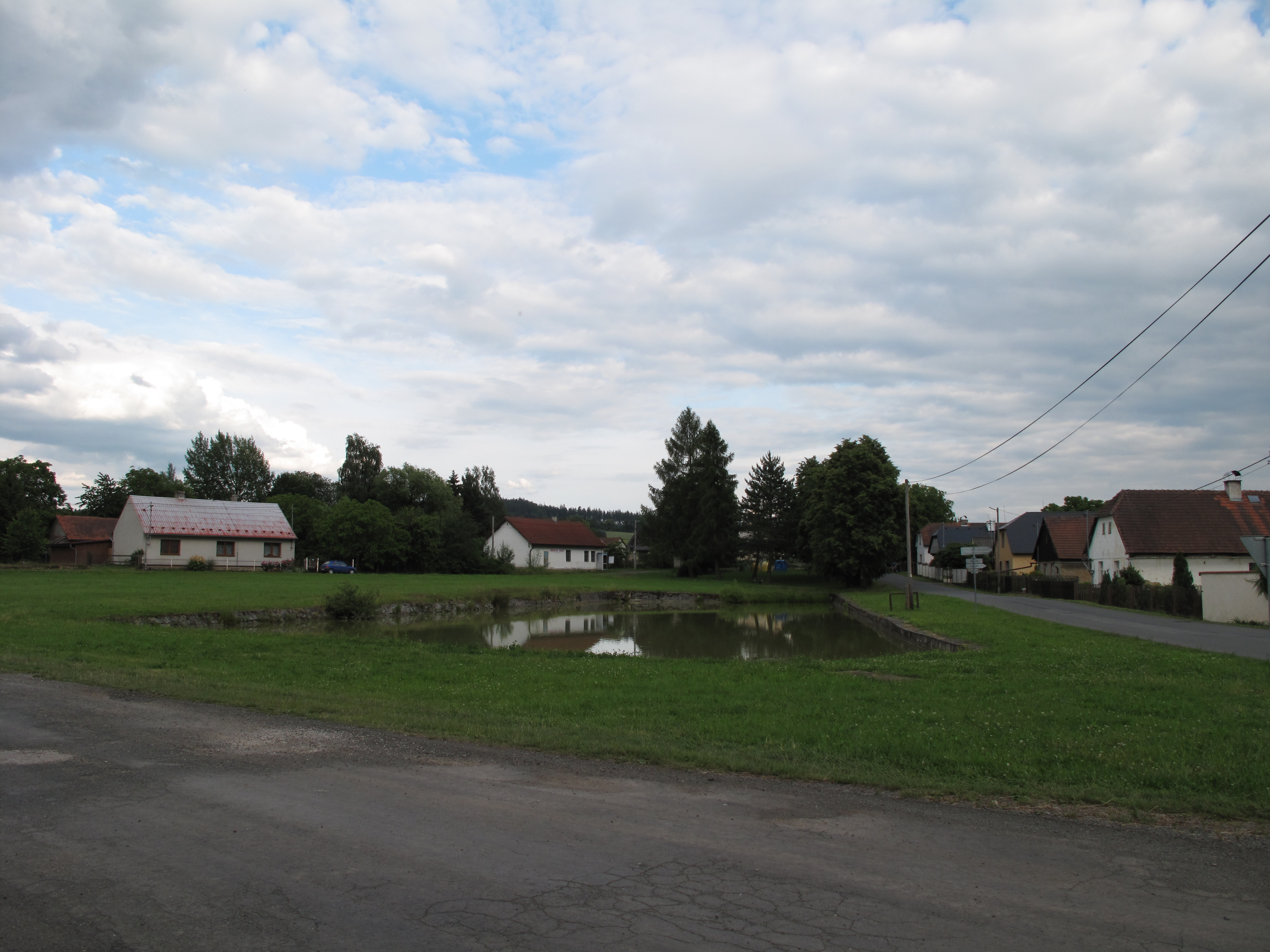
- Centre of Trokavec

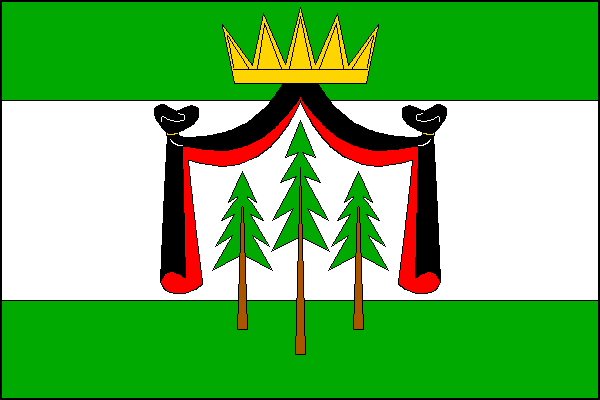
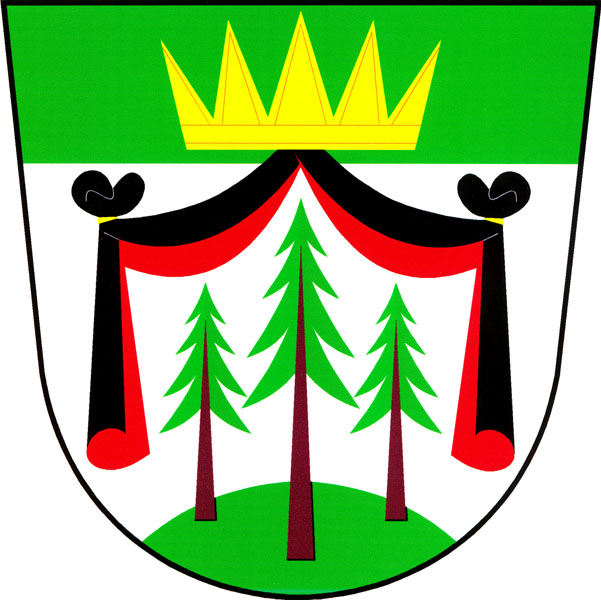
- Flag Coat of arms

- Location in the Czech Republic
- Coordinates: 49°38′49″N 13°42′8″E
- Country: Czech Republic
- Region: Plzeň
- District: Rokycany
- First mentioned: 1545

Area
  - Total: 4.39 km^{2} (1.69 sq mi)
- Elevation: 615 m (2,018 ft)

Population (2026-01-01)
  - Total: 109
  - Density: 24.8/km^{2} (64.3/sq mi)
- Time zone: UTC+1 (CET)
  - Summer (DST): UTC+2 (CEST)
- Postal code: 338 43
- Website: www.obec-trokavec.cz

Trokavec is a municipality and village in Rokycany District in the Plzeň Region of the Czech Republic. It has about 100 inhabitants.

== Geography ==
Trokavec is located about 13 kilometres (8 mi) southeast of Rokycany and 23 km (14 mi) southeast of Plzeň. It lies on the border between the Brdy Highlands and Švihov Highlands. The highest point is the hill Trokavecká skála at 706 m (2,316 ft) above sea level.

== Demographics ==
Historical population
Year	Pop.	±%
1869	514	—
1880	594	+15.6%
1890	506	−14.8%
1900	431	−14.8%
1910	407	−5.6%
1921	388	−4.7%
1930	383	−1.3%
1950	217	−43.3%
1961	224	+3.2%
1970	178	−20.5%
1980	143	−19.7%
1991	132	−7.7%
2001	105	−20.5%
2011	87	−17.1%
2021	100	+14.9%
Source: Censuses
