= Plíšek =

Plíšek (Czech pronunciation: [pliːʃek], feminine: Plíšková) is a Czech surname. Notable people include:

- Jiří Plíšek (born 1972), Czech football player and manager
- Karolína Plíšková (born 1992), Czech tennis player
- Kristýna Plíšková (born 1992), Czech tennis player, identical twin sister of Karolína
- Naděžda Plíšková (1934–1999), Czech graphic artist
- Tereza Plíšková (born 1990), Czech curling competitor

== See also ==
- Pliskov (disambiguation)
