= Nevid =

- Municipality
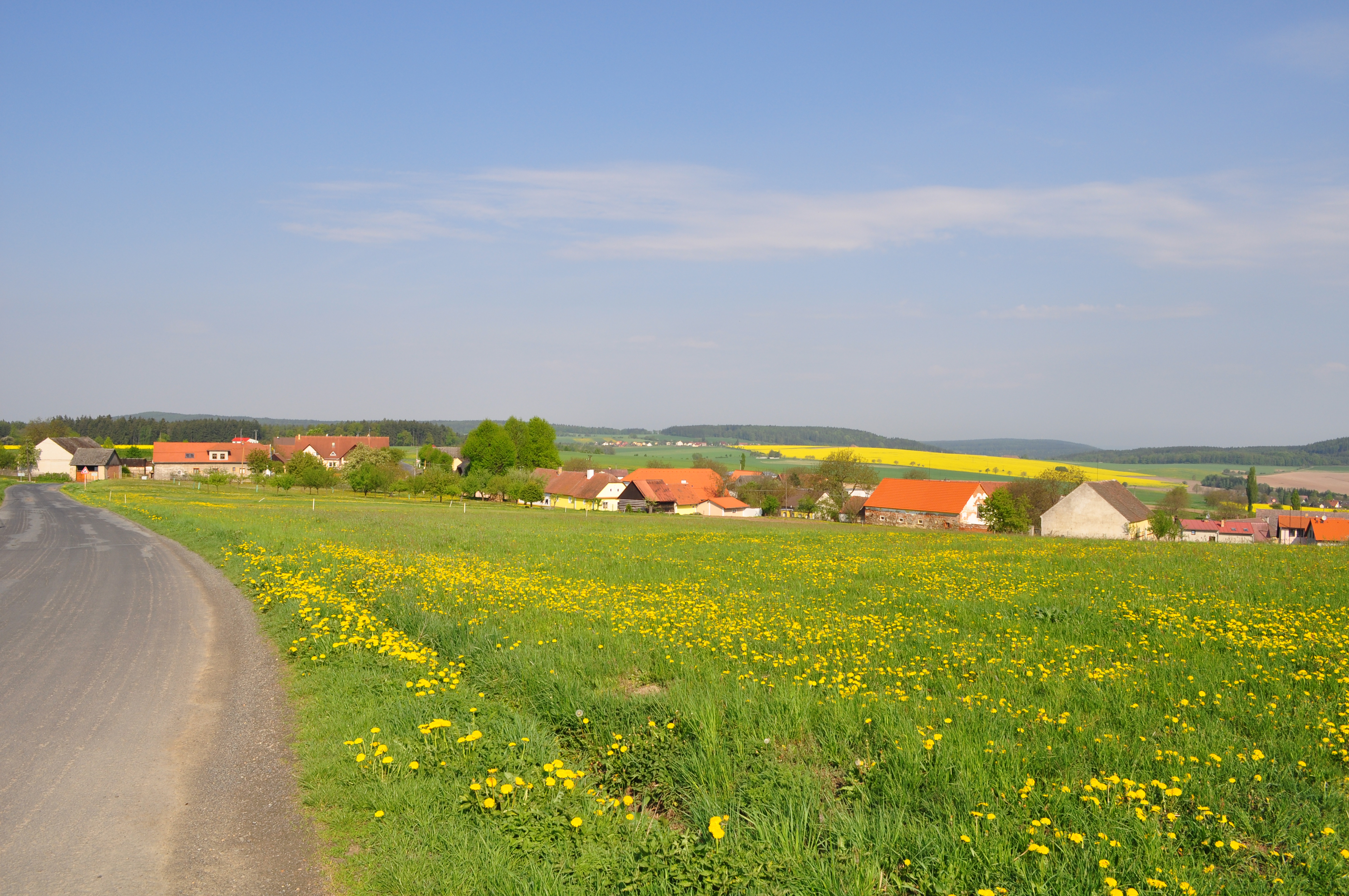
- General view

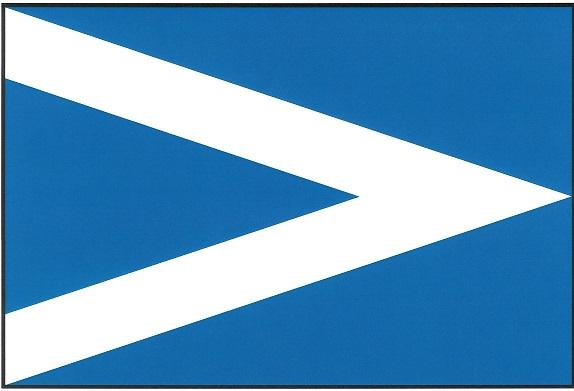
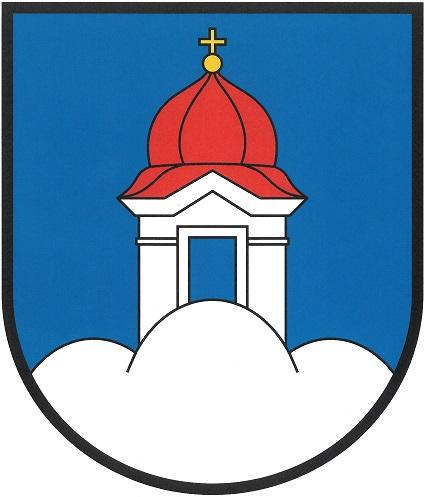
- Flag Coat of arms

- Location in the Czech Republic
- Coordinates: 49°41′8″N 13°36′20″E
- Country: Czech Republic
- Region: Plzeň
- District: Rokycany
- First mentioned: 1227

Area
  - Total: 4.89 km^{2} (1.89 sq mi)
- Elevation: 499 m (1,637 ft)

Population (2026-01-01)
  - Total: 191
  - Density: 39.1/km^{2} (101/sq mi)
- Time zone: UTC+1 (CET)
  - Summer (DST): UTC+2 (CEST)
- Postal code: 337 01
- Website: www.obecnevid.cz

Nevid is a municipality and village in Rokycany District in the Plzeň Region of the Czech Republic. It has about 200 inhabitants.

Nevid lies approximately 8 kilometres (5 mi) south of Rokycany, 19 km (12 mi) east of Plzeň, and 73 km (45 mi) south-west of Prague.

== Demographics ==
Historical population
Year	Pop.	±%
1869	301	—
1880	335	+11.3%
1890	305	−9.0%
1900	245	−19.7%
1910	284	+15.9%
1921	322	+13.4%
1930	306	−5.0%
1950	236	−22.9%
1961	258	+9.3%
1970	217	−15.9%
1980	164	−24.4%
1991	148	−9.8%
2001	136	−8.1%
2011	174	+27.9%
2021	174	+0.0%
Source: Censuses
