= Štítov =

- Municipality
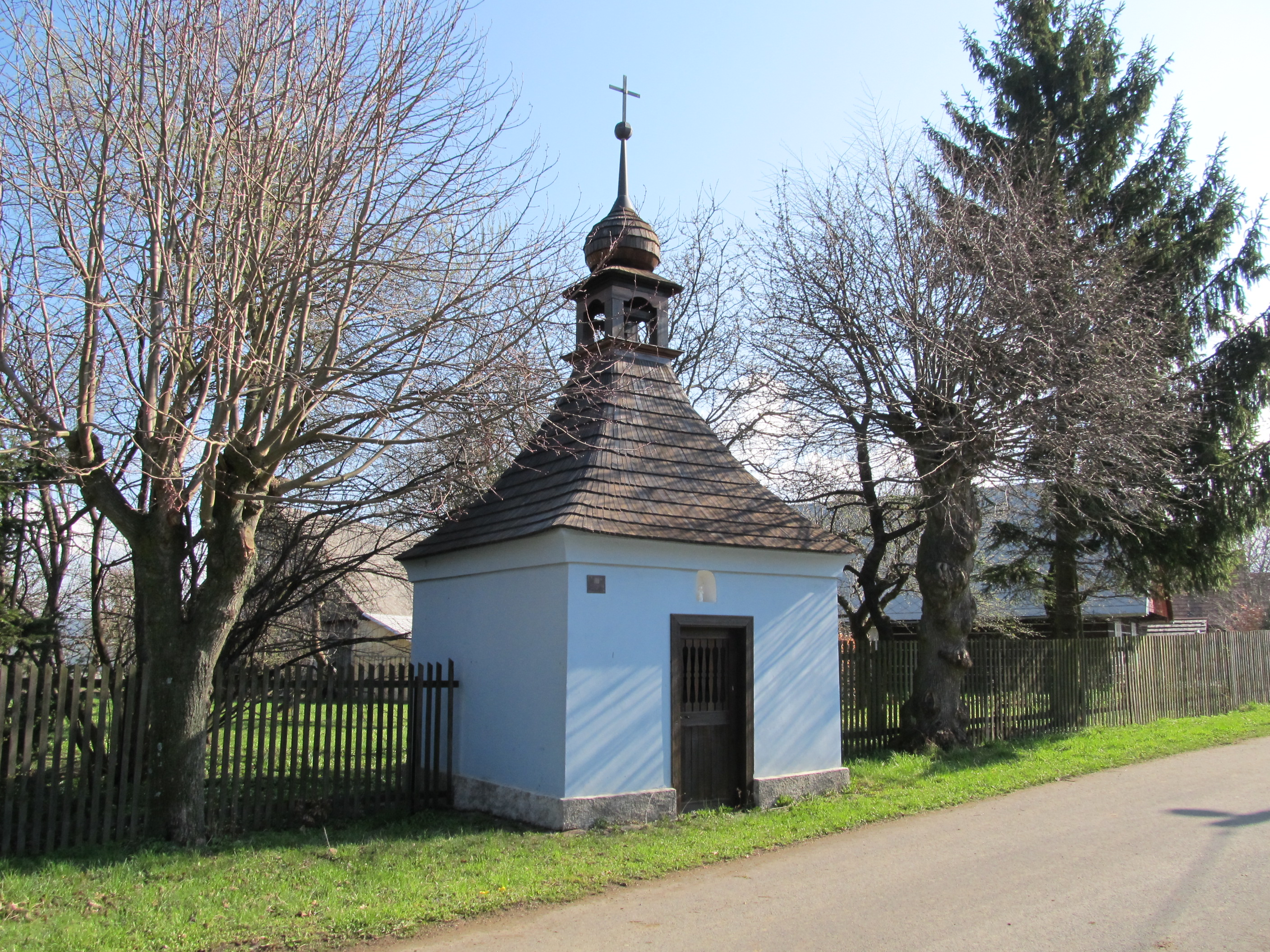
- Chapel of the Visitation of Our Lady

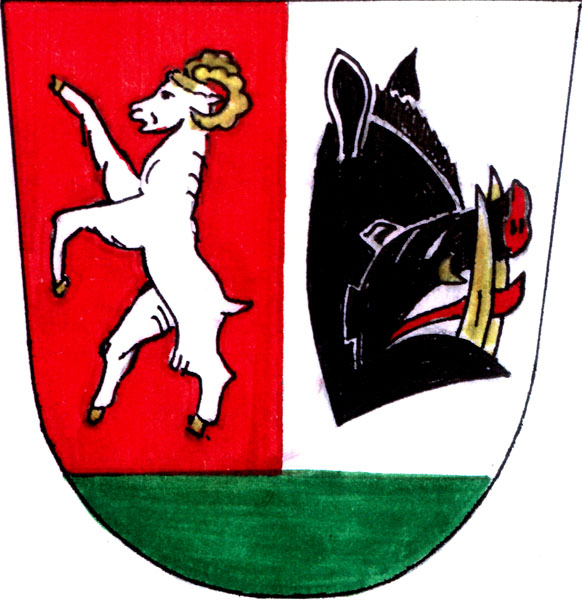
- Flag Coat of arms

- Location in the Czech Republic
- Coordinates: 49°39′58″N 13°40′41″E
- Country: Czech Republic
- Region: Plzeň
- District: Rokycany
- First mentioned: 1460

Area
  - Total: 2.62 km^{2} (1.01 sq mi)
- Elevation: 533 m (1,749 ft)

Population (2026-01-01)
  - Total: 49
  - Density: 19/km^{2} (48/sq mi)
- Time zone: UTC+1 (CET)
  - Summer (DST): UTC+2 (CEST)
- Postal code: 338 43
- Website: www.stitov.cz

Štítov (Czech pronunciation: [ˈʃciːtof]) is a municipality and village in Rokycany District in the Plzeň Region of the Czech Republic. It has about 50 inhabitants.

Štítov lies approximately 12 kilometres (7 mi) south-east of Rokycany, 24 km (15 mi) east of Plzeň, and 71 km (44 mi) south-west of Prague.

== Demographics ==
Historical population
Year	Pop.	±%
1869	194	—
1880	199	+2.6%
1890	204	+2.5%
1900	178	−12.7%
1910	147	−17.4%
1921	157	+6.8%
1930	160	+1.9%
1950	92	−42.5%
1961	91	−1.1%
1970	86	−5.5%
1980	54	−37.2%
1991	57	+5.6%
2001	54	−5.3%
2011	59	+9.3%
2021	44	−25.4%
Source: Censuses
