= Plískov =

- Municipality
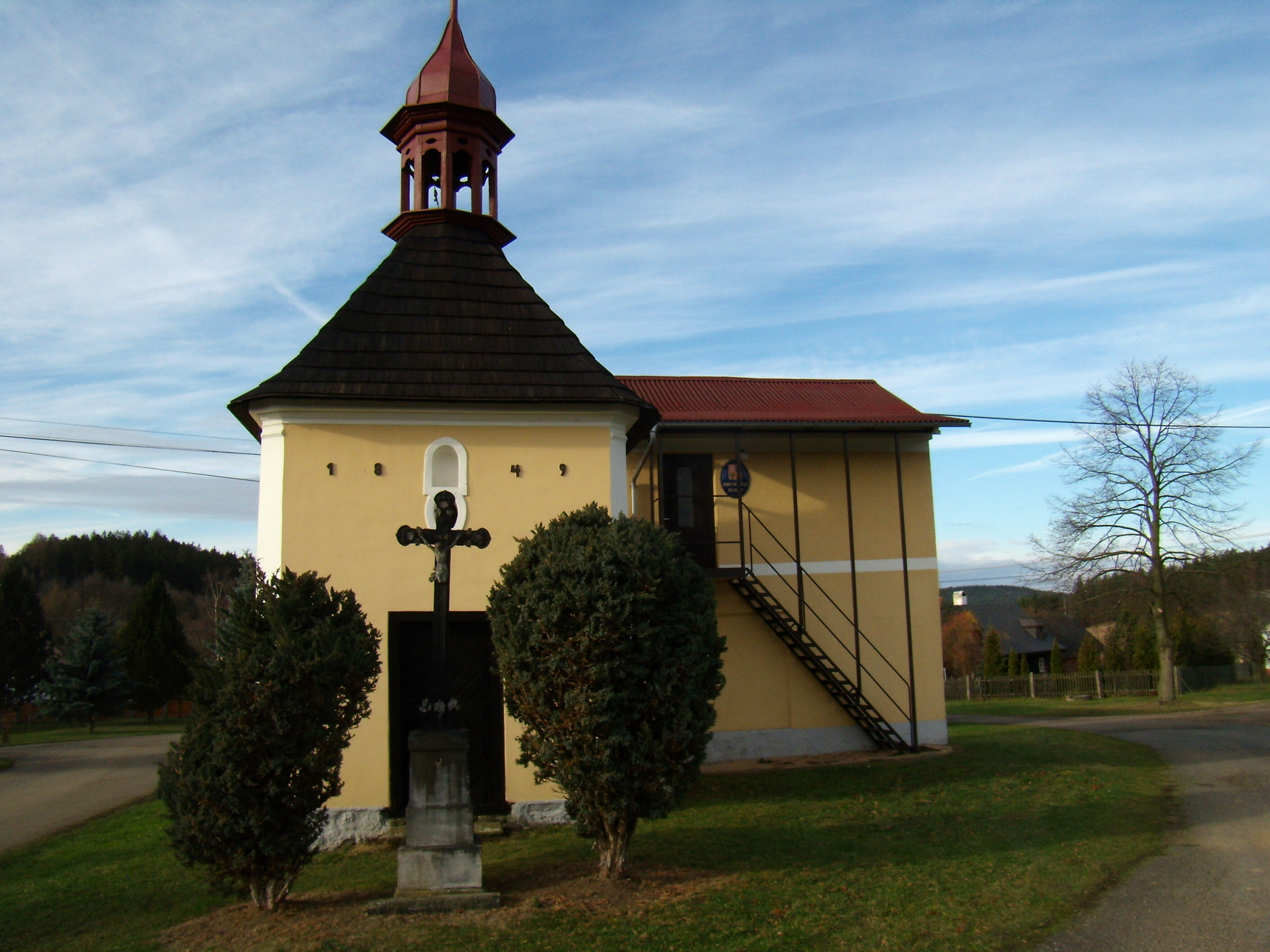
- Chapel and municipal office

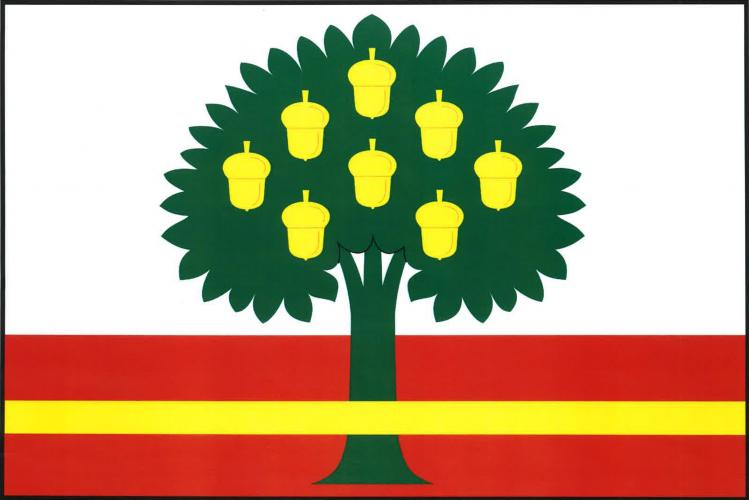
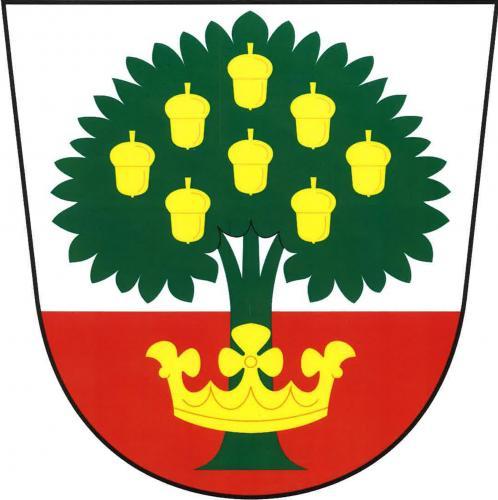
- Flag Coat of arms

- Location in the Czech Republic
- Coordinates: 49°50′37″N 13°44′7″E
- Country: Czech Republic
- Region: Plzeň
- District: Rokycany
- First mentioned: 1377

Area
  - Total: 3.34 km^{2} (1.29 sq mi)
- Elevation: 463 m (1,519 ft)

Population (2026-01-01)
  - Total: 122
  - Density: 36.5/km^{2} (94.6/sq mi)
- Time zone: UTC+1 (CET)
  - Summer (DST): UTC+2 (CEST)
- Postal code: 338 08
- Website: www.pliskov.cz

Plískov is a municipality and village in Rokycany District in the Plzeň Region of the Czech Republic. It has about 100 inhabitants.

Plískov lies approximately 16 kilometres (10 mi) north-east of Rokycany, 28 km (17 mi) east of Plzeň, and 57 km (35 mi) south-west of Prague.

== Demographics ==
Historical population
Year	Pop.	±%
1869	392	—
1880	392	+0.0%
1890	301	−23.2%
1900	289	−4.0%
1910	241	−16.6%
1921	231	−4.1%
1930	244	+5.6%
1950	199	−18.4%
1961	211	+6.0%
1970	190	−10.0%
1980	148	−22.1%
1991	130	−12.2%
2001	122	−6.2%
2011	106	−13.1%
2021	120	+13.2%
Source: Censuses
