= Újezd =

Újezd (Czech pronunciation: [ˈuːjɛst]) is a common Czech toponym, roughly meaning 'around-ridden'. It denotes a settlement newly established in the Middle Ages (usually in woody, previously sparsely populated areas of the country). The boundaries of such portion of land were set by riding on horseback around the location (Latin: circumequitatio).

== Municipalities ==
- Újezd (Beroun District) in the Central Bohemian Region
- Újezd (Domažlice District) in the Plzeň Region
- Újezd (Olomouc District) in the Olomouc Region
- Újezd (Žďár nad Sázavou District) in the Vysočina Region
- Újezd (Zlín District) in the Zlín Region
- Újezd (Znojmo District) in the South Moravian Region
- Újezd nade Mží in the Plzeň Region
- Újezd pod Troskami in the Hradec Králové Region
- Újezd u Boskovic in the South Moravian Region
- Újezd u Brna in the South Moravian Region
- Újezd u Černé Hory in the South Moravian Region
- Újezd u Chocně in the Pardubice Region
- Újezd u Plánice in the Plzeň Region
- Újezd u Přelouče in the Pardubice Region
- Újezd u Rosic in the South Moravian Region
- Újezd u Sezemic in the Pardubice Region
- Újezd u Svatého Kříže in the Plzeň Region
- Újezd u Tišnova in the South Moravian Region
- Bílý Újezd in the Hradec Králové Region
- Červený Újezd (Benešov District) in the Central Bohemian Region
- Červený Újezd (Prague-West District) in the Central Bohemian Region
- Chodský Újezd in the Plzeň Region
- Dlouhý Újezd in the Plzeň Region
- Dolní Újezd (Přerov District) in the Olomouc Region
- Dolní Újezd (Svitavy District) in the Pardubice Region
- Drahoňův Újezd in the Plzeň Region
- Horní Újezd (Přerov District) in the Olomouc Region
- Horní Újezd (Svitavy District) in the Pardubice Region
- Horní Újezd (Třebíč District) in the Vysočina Region
- Hřivínův Újezd in the Zlín Region
- Kamenný Újezd (České Budějovice District) in the South Bohemian Region
- Kamenný Újezd (Rokycany District) in the Plzeň Region
- Malý Újezd in the Central Bohemian Region
- Medový Újezd in the Plzeň Region
- Ostrolovský Újezd in the South Bohemian Region
- Panoší Újezd in the Central Bohemian Region
- Pletený Újezd in the Central Bohemian Region
- Podhorní Újezd a Vojice in the Hradec Králové Region
- Svatojanský Újezd in the Hradec Králové Region
- Svijanský Újezd in the Liberec Region
- Velký Újezd in the Olomouc Region
- Vysoký Újezd (Benešov District) in the Central Bohemian Region
- Vysoký Újezd (Beroun District) in the Central Bohemian Region
- Vysoký Újezd (Hradec Králové District) in the Hradec Králové Region

== Municipal parts ==
- Újezd, a part of Albrechtice nad Vltavou in the South Bohemian Region
- Újezd, a part of Černilov in the Hradec Králové Region
- Újezd, a part of Horšice in the Plzeň Region
- Újezd, a part of Jestřebí (Česká Lípa District) in the Liberec Region
- Újezd, a part of Kunštát in the South Moravian Region
- Újezd, a part of Manětín in the Plzeň Region
- Újezd, a part of Mohelnice in the Olomouc Region
- Újezd, a part of Plzeň in the Plzeň Region
- Újezd, a part of Smilovice (Mladá Boleslav District) in the Central Bohemian Region
- Újezd, a part of Štětí in the Ústí nad Labem Region
- Újezd, a part of Trmice in the Ústí nad Labem Region
- Újezd, a part of Vodňany in the South Bohemian Region
- Újezd u Průhonic, a district of Prague

== See also ==
- Újezdec (disambiguation), a toponym of the same origin
- Uyezd, a Russian administrative subdivision
