= Újezd u Svatého Kříže =

- Municipality
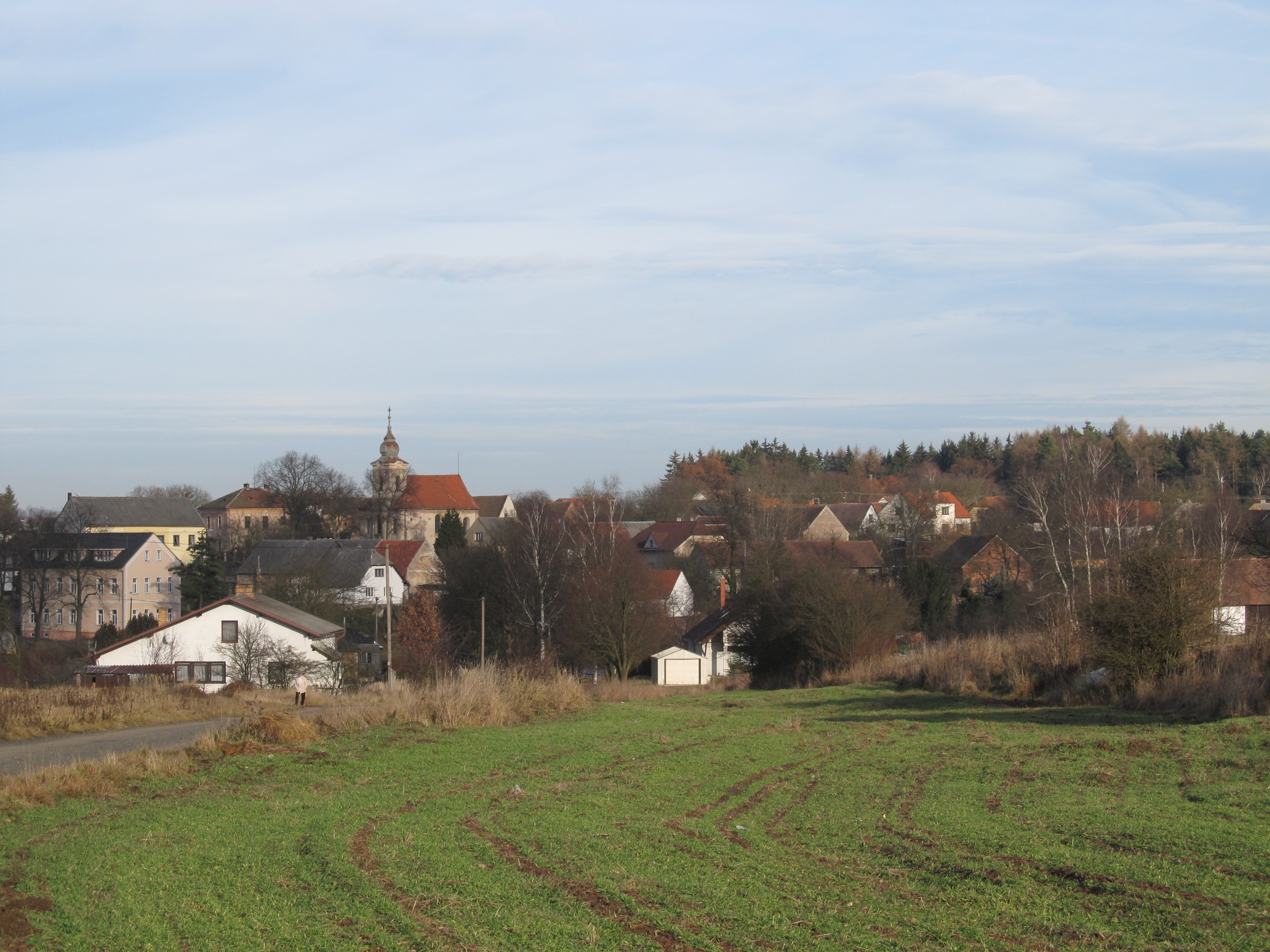
- General view

- Flag Coat of arms

- Location in the Czech Republic
- Coordinates: 49°51′35″N 13°34′10″E
- Country: Czech Republic
- Region: Plzeň
- District: Rokycany
- First mentioned: 1352

Area
  - Total: 4.40 km^{2} (1.70 sq mi)
- Elevation: 430 m (1,410 ft)

Population (2026-01-01)
  - Total: 241
  - Density: 54.8/km^{2} (142/sq mi)
- Time zone: UTC+1 (CET)
  - Summer (DST): UTC+2 (CEST)
- Postal code: 338 24
- Website: www.ujezdusvatehokrize.cz

Újezd u Svatého Kříže is a municipality and village in Rokycany District in the Plzeň Region of the Czech Republic. It has about 200 inhabitants.

Újezd u Svatého Kříže lies approximately 13 kilometres (8 mi) north of Rokycany, 19 km (12 mi) north-east of Plzeň, and 67 km (42 mi) west of Prague.

== Demographics ==
Historical population
Year	Pop.	±%
1869	539	—
1880	576	+6.9%
1890	684	+18.8%
1900	746	+9.1%
1910	478	−35.9%
1921	767	+60.5%
1930	627	−18.3%
1950	431	−31.3%
1961	429	−0.5%
1970	392	−8.6%
1980	298	−24.0%
1991	236	−20.8%
2001	210	−11.0%
2011	230	+9.5%
2021	237	+3.0%
Source: Censuses
