= Újezd u Přelouče =

- Municipality
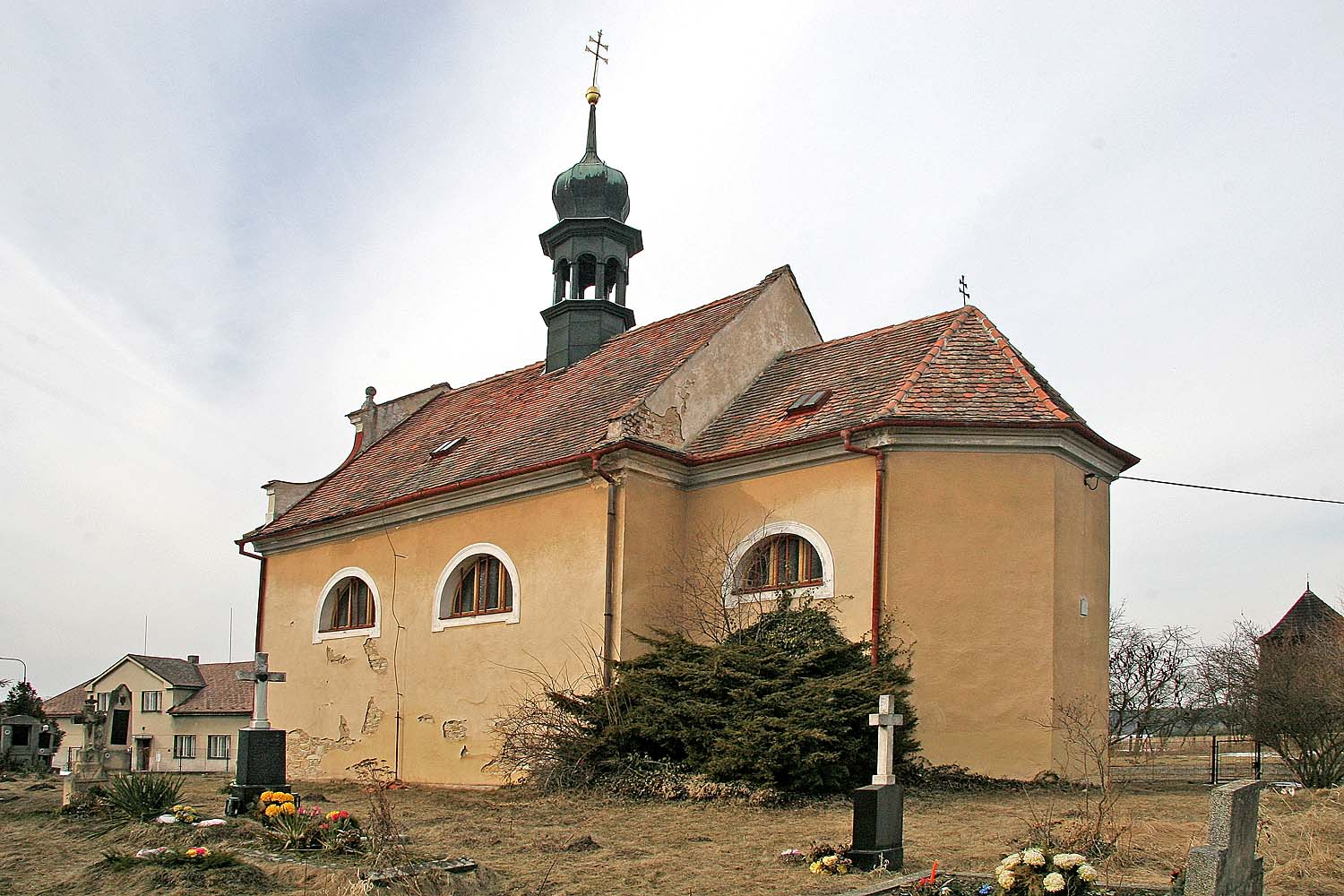
- Church of Saint Giles

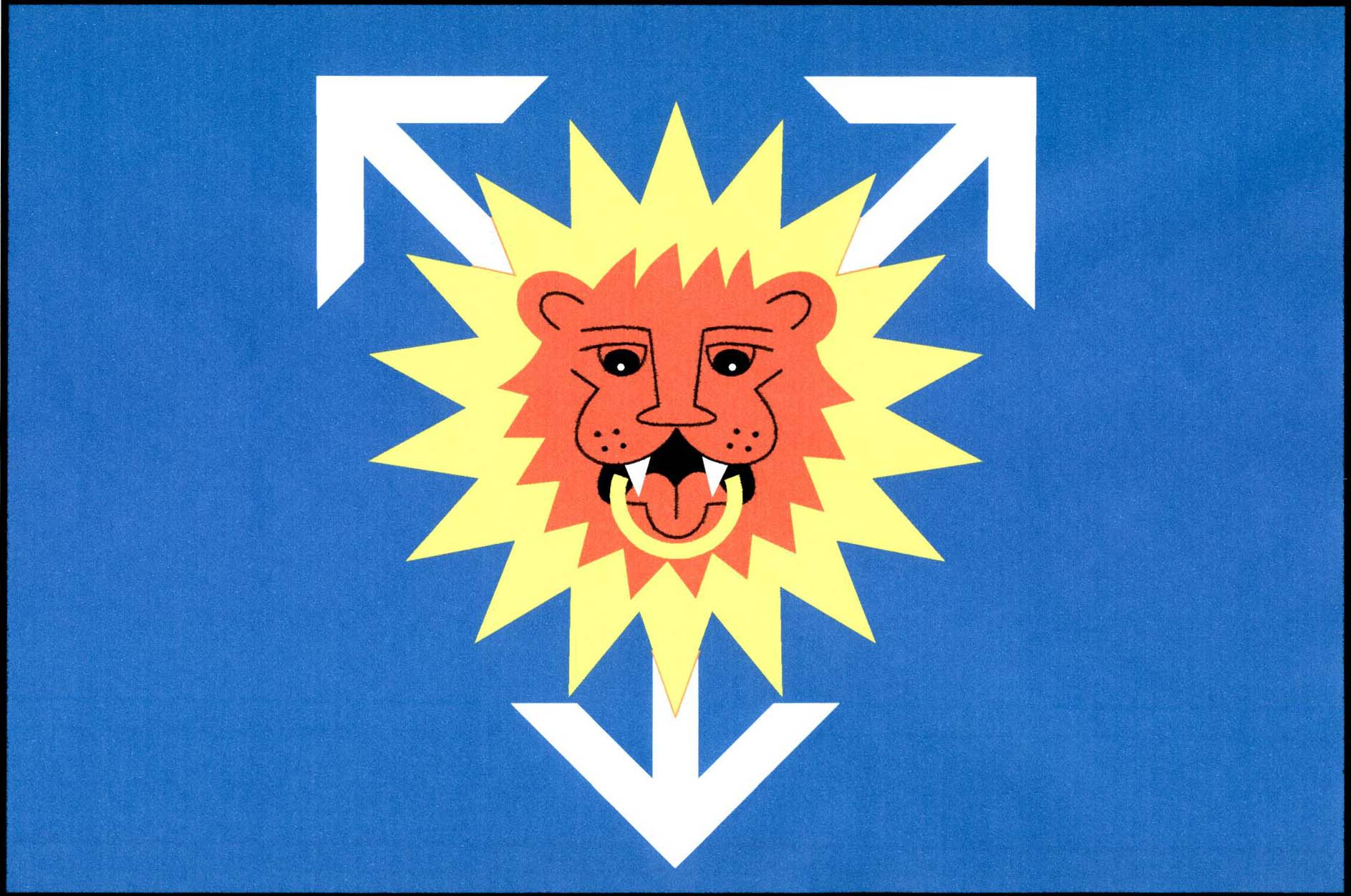
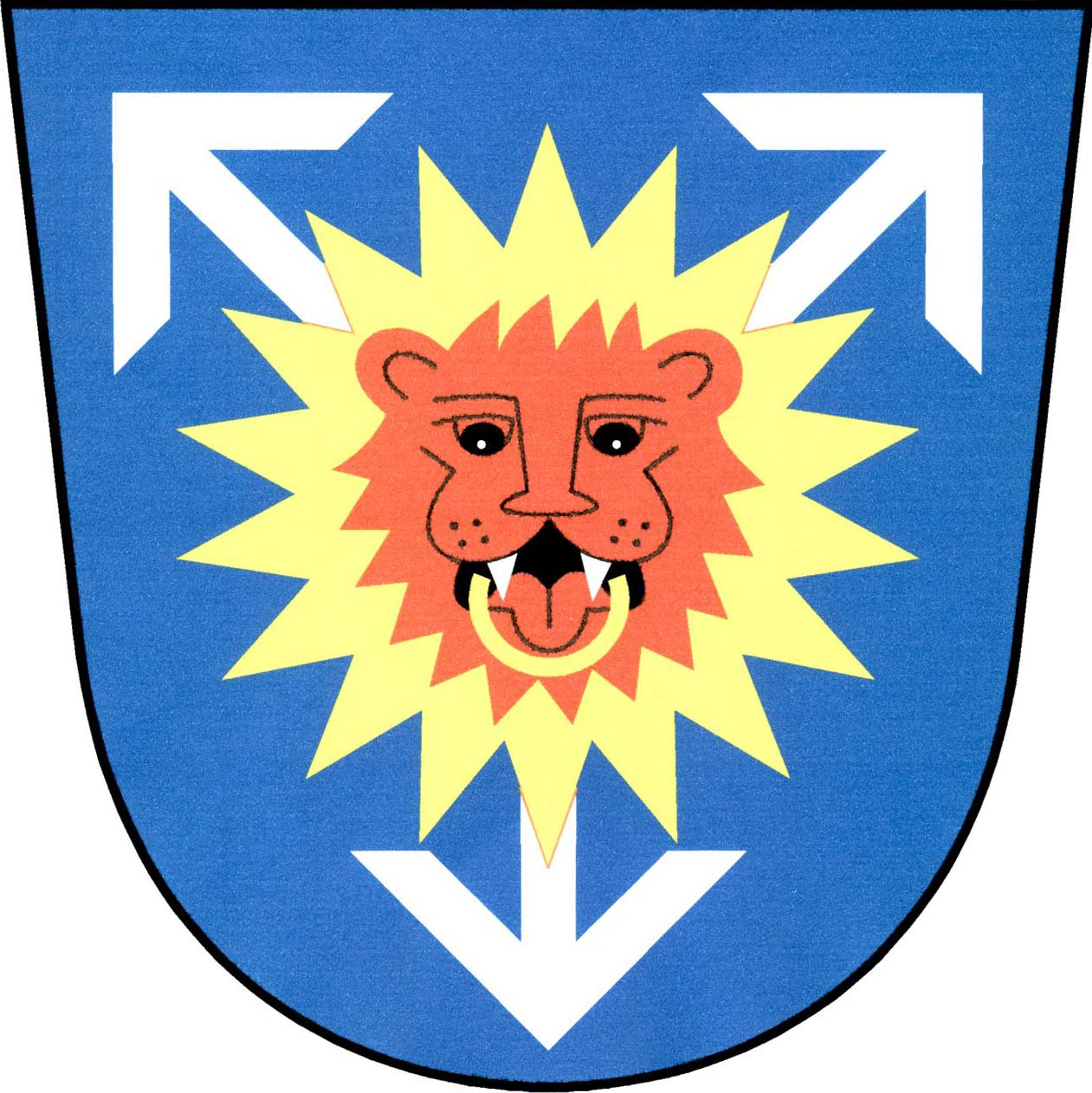
- Flag Coat of arms

- Location in the Czech Republic
- Coordinates: 50°6′7″N 15°29′41″E
- Country: Czech Republic
- Region: Pardubice
- District: Pardubice
- First mentioned: 1299

Area
  - Total: 3.42 km^{2} (1.32 sq mi)
- Elevation: 222 m (728 ft)

Population (2026-01-01)
  - Total: 244
  - Density: 71.3/km^{2} (185/sq mi)
- Time zone: UTC+1 (CET)
  - Summer (DST): UTC+2 (CEST)
- Postal code: 533 16
- Website: www.ujezduprelouce.cz

Újezd u Přelouče (Czech pronunciation: [ˈuːjɛst ˈupr̝̊ɛloutʃɛ]) is a municipality and village in Pardubice District in the Pardubice Region of the Czech Republic. It has about 200 inhabitants.

== Demographics ==
Historical population
| Year | Pop. | ±% |
|---|---|---|
| 1869 | 298 | — |
| 1880 | 295 | −1.0% |
| 1890 | 284 | −3.7% |
| 1900 | 284 | +0.0% |
| 1910 | 303 | +6.7% |
| 1921 | 331 | +9.2% |
| 1930 | 325 | −1.8% |
| 1950 | 236 | −27.4% |
| 1961 | 265 | +12.3% |
| 1970 | 241 | −9.1% |
| 1980 | 230 | −4.6% |
| 1991 | 198 | −13.9% |
| 2001 | 189 | −4.5% |
| 2011 | 197 | +4.2% |
| 2021 | 233 | +18.3% |
Source: Censuses
