= Újezd (Beroun District) =

- Municipality
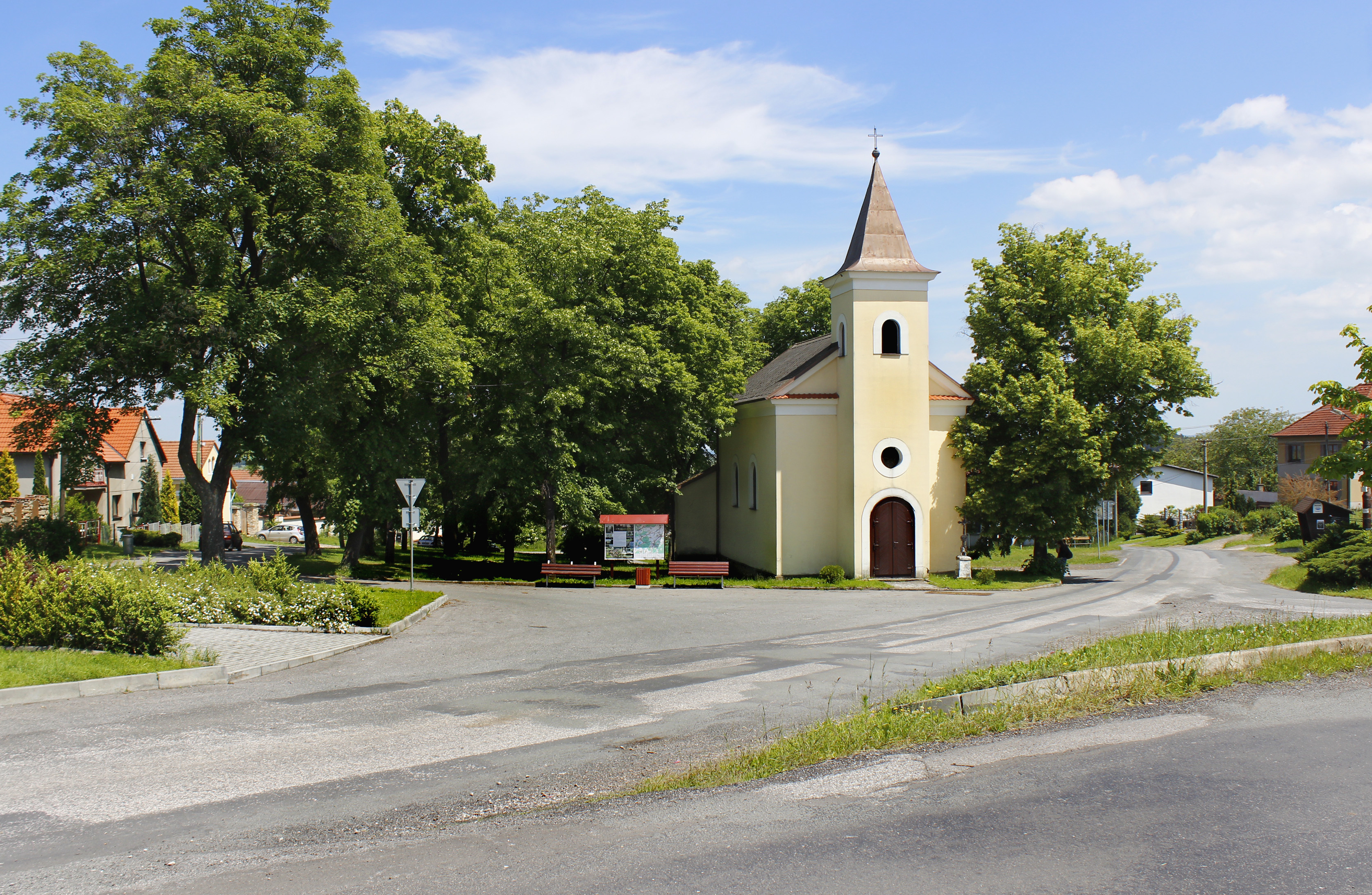
- Common with Chapel of the Sacred Heart

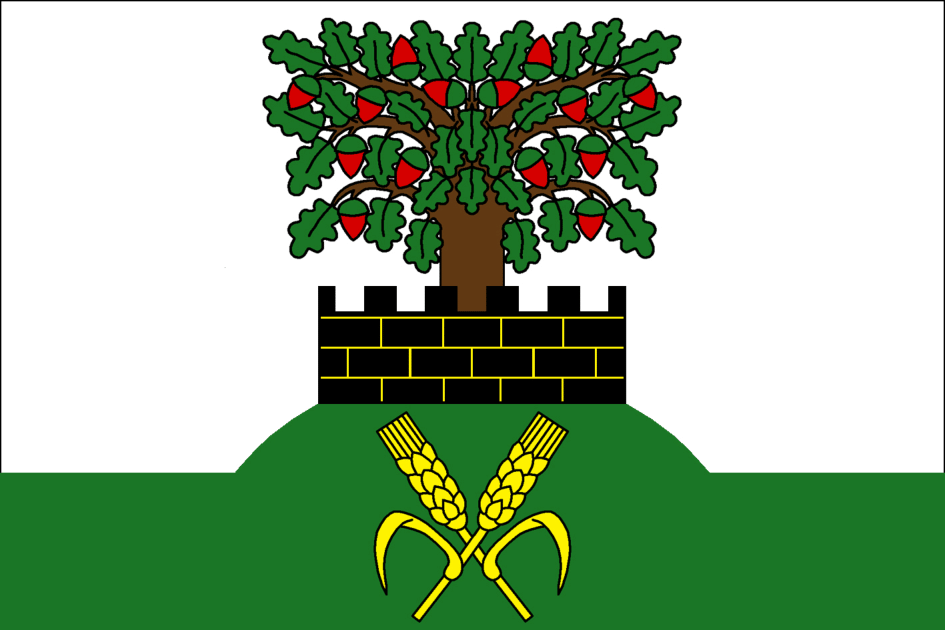
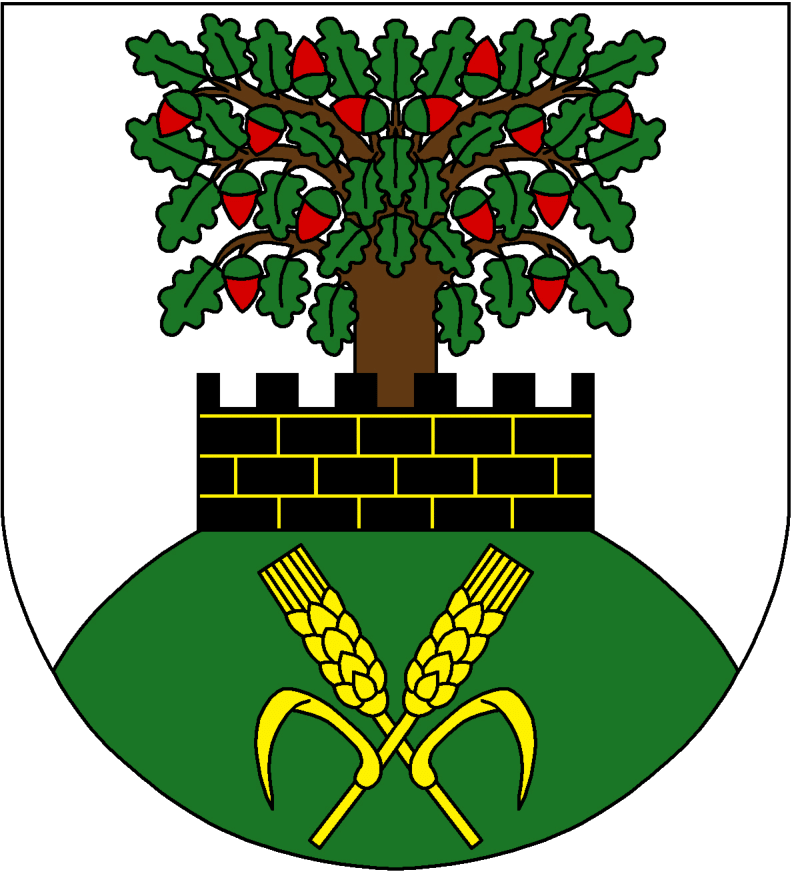
- Flag Coat of arms

- Location in the Czech Republic
- Coordinates: 49°49′53″N 13°50′15″E
- Country: Czech Republic
- Region: Central Bohemian
- District: Beroun
- First mentioned: 1399

Area
  - Total: 10.41 km^{2} (4.02 sq mi)
- Elevation: 414 m (1,358 ft)

Population (2026-01-01)
  - Total: 688
  - Density: 66.1/km^{2} (171/sq mi)
- Time zone: UTC+1 (CET)
  - Summer (DST): UTC+2 (CEST)
- Postal code: 267 61
- Website: www.ujezducerhovic.cz

Újezd is a municipality and village in Beroun District in the Central Bohemian Region of the Czech Republic. It has about 700 inhabitants.

Újezd is located about 22 kilometres (14 mi) southwest of Beroun and 50 km (31 mi) southwest of Prague.

== History ==
The first written mention of Újezd is from 1399.

== Demographics ==
Historical population
Year	Pop.	±%
1869	525	—
1880	506	−3.6%
1890	517	+2.2%
1900	579	+12.0%
1910	658	+13.6%
1921	680	+3.3%
1930	728	+7.1%
1950	652	−10.4%
1961	683	+4.8%
1970	643	−5.9%
1980	619	−3.7%
1991	548	−11.5%
2001	555	+1.3%
2011	616	+11.0%
2021	680	+10.4%
Source: Censuses
