= Medový Újezd =

- Municipality
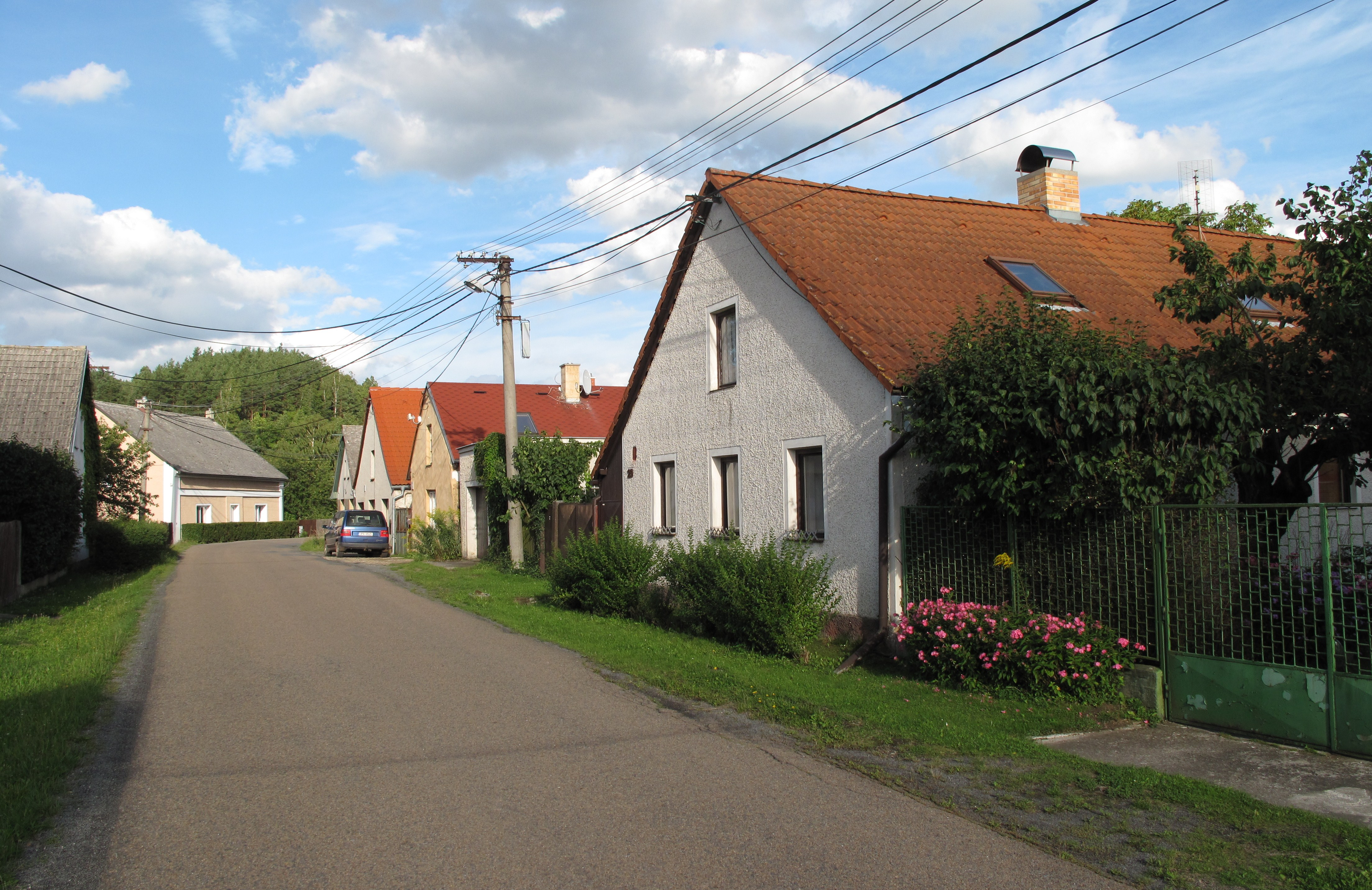
- Side street

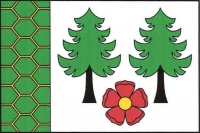
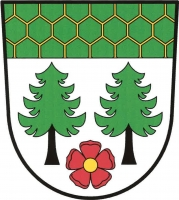
- Flag Coat of arms

- Location in the Czech Republic
- Coordinates: 49°46′26″N 13°43′9″E
- Country: Czech Republic
- Region: Plzeň
- District: Rokycany
- First mentioned: 1336

Area
  - Total: 13.31 km^{2} (5.14 sq mi)
- Elevation: 451 m (1,480 ft)

Population (2026-01-01)
  - Total: 276
  - Density: 20.7/km^{2} (53.7/sq mi)
- Time zone: UTC+1 (CET)
  - Summer (DST): UTC+2 (CEST)
- Postal code: 337 01
- Website: www.obecmedovyujezd.cz

Medový Újezd is a municipality and village in Rokycany District in the Plzeň Region of the Czech Republic. It has about 300 inhabitants.

Medový Újezd lies approximately 10 kilometres (6 mi) east of Rokycany, 26 km (16 mi) east of Plzeň, and 63 km (39 mi) south-west of Prague.

== Demographics ==
Historical population
Year	Pop.	±%
1869	392	—
1880	356	−9.2%
1890	418	+17.4%
1900	464	+11.0%
1910	462	−0.4%
1921	431	−6.7%
1930	468	+8.6%
1950	395	−15.6%
1961	386	−2.3%
1970	352	−8.8%
1980	290	−17.6%
1991	232	−20.0%
2001	185	−20.3%
2011	222	+20.0%
2021	261	+17.6%
Source: Censuses
