= Hřivínův Újezd =

- Municipality
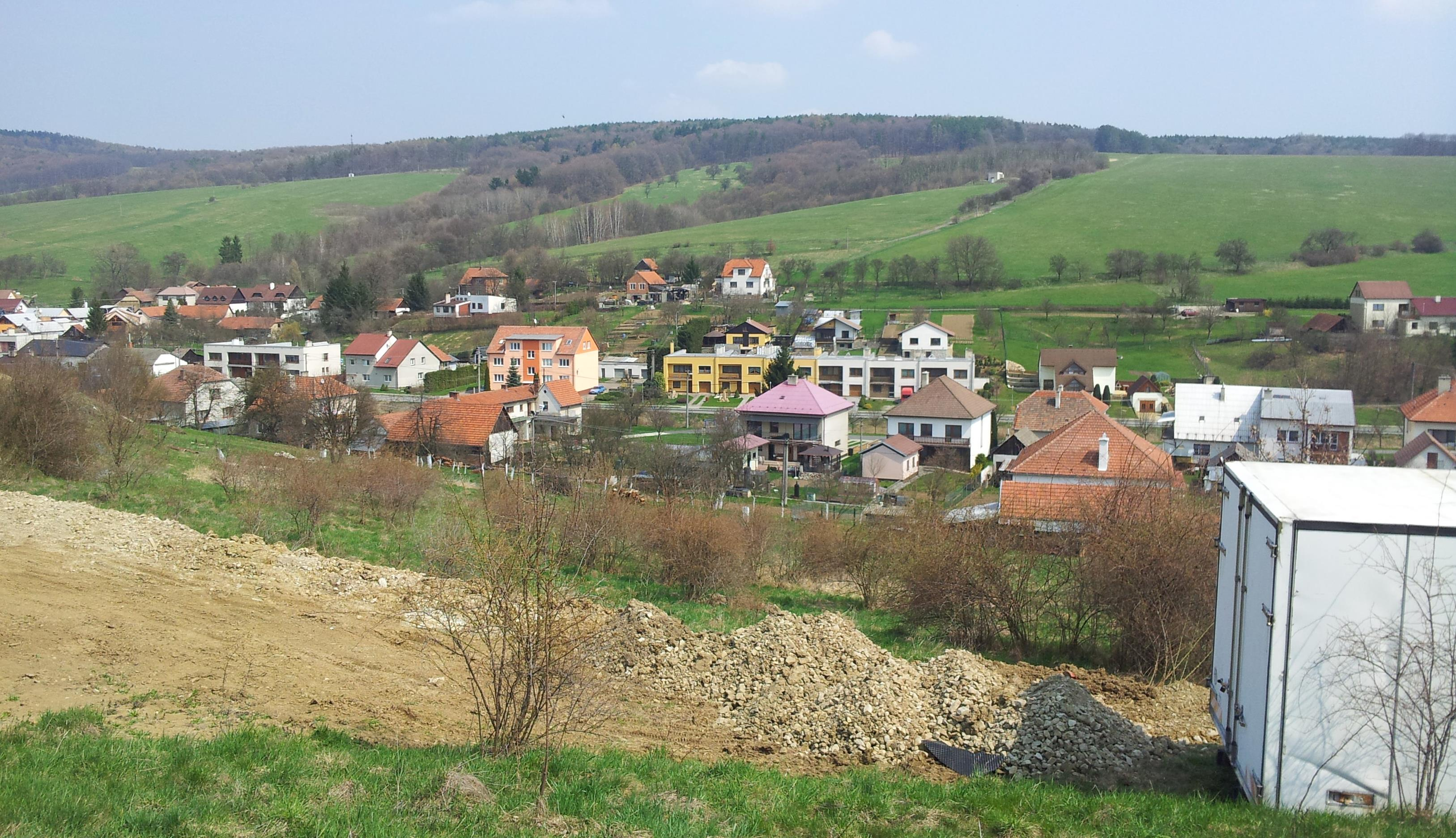
- General view

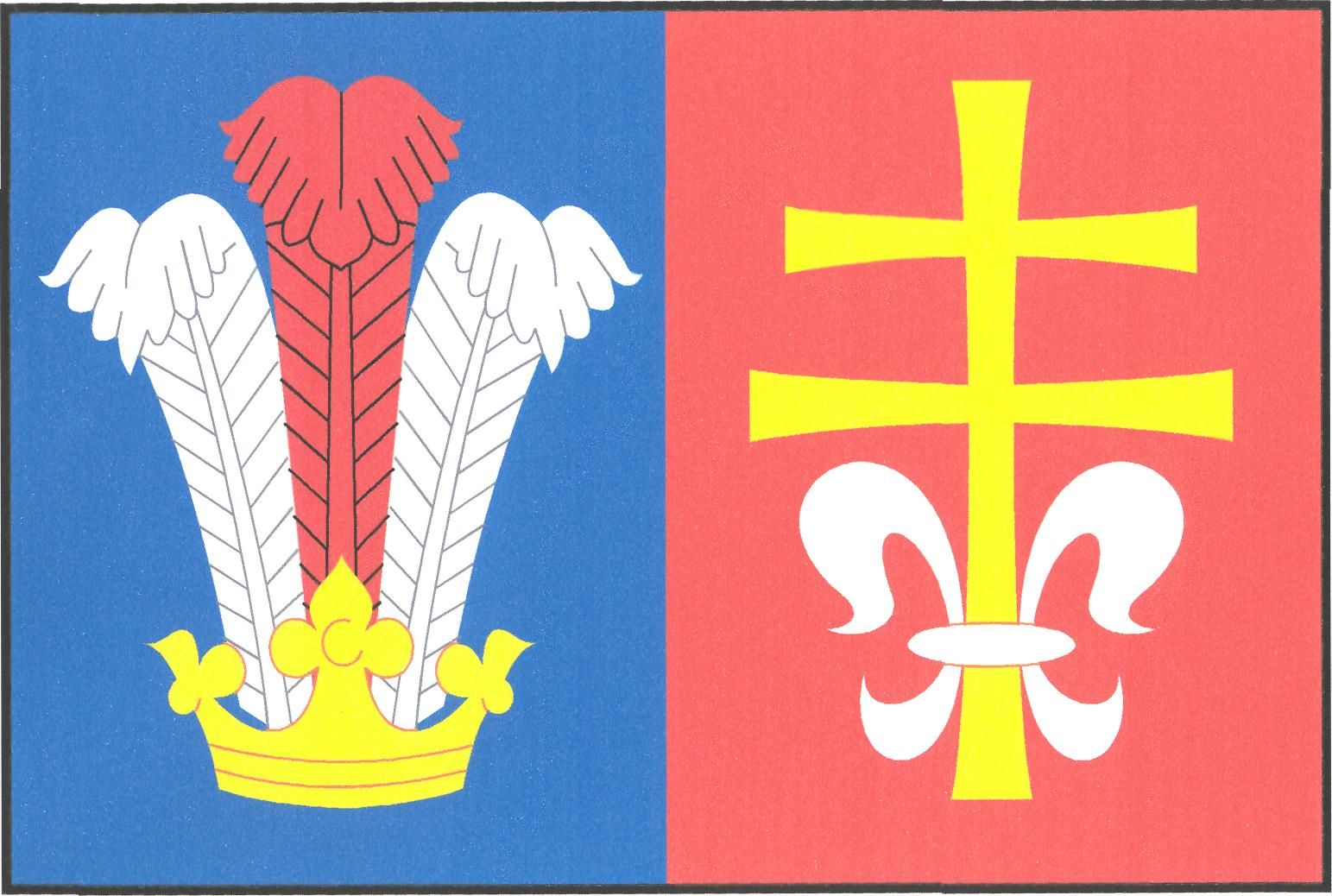
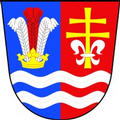
- Flag Coat of arms

- Location in the Czech Republic
- Coordinates: 49°7′27″N 17°41′31″E
- Country: Czech Republic
- Region: Zlín
- District: Zlín
- First mentioned: 1373

Area
  - Total: 7.66 km^{2} (2.96 sq mi)
- Elevation: 272 m (892 ft)

Population (2026-01-01)
  - Total: 514
  - Density: 67.1/km^{2} (174/sq mi)
- Time zone: UTC+1 (CET)
  - Summer (DST): UTC+2 (CEST)
- Postal code: 763 07
- Website: www.hrivinuvujezd.cz

Hřivínův Újezd is a municipality and village in Zlín District in the Zlín Region of the Czech Republic. It has about 500 inhabitants.

Hřivínův Újezd lies approximately 13 kilometres (8 mi) south of Zlín and 259 km (161 mi) south-east of Prague.

== Demographics ==
Historical population
| Year | Pop. | ±% |
|---|---|---|
| 1869 | 380 | — |
| 1880 | 412 | +8.4% |
| 1890 | 416 | +1.0% |
| 1900 | 450 | +8.2% |
| 1910 | 465 | +3.3% |
| 1921 | 478 | +2.8% |
| 1930 | 487 | +1.9% |
| 1950 | 533 | +9.4% |
| 1961 | 590 | +10.7% |
| 1970 | 542 | −8.1% |
| 1980 | 537 | −0.9% |
| 1991 | 562 | +4.7% |
| 2001 | 567 | +0.9% |
| 2011 | 531 | −6.3% |
| 2021 | 528 | −0.6% |
Source: Censuses
