= Svatojanský Újezd =

- Municipality
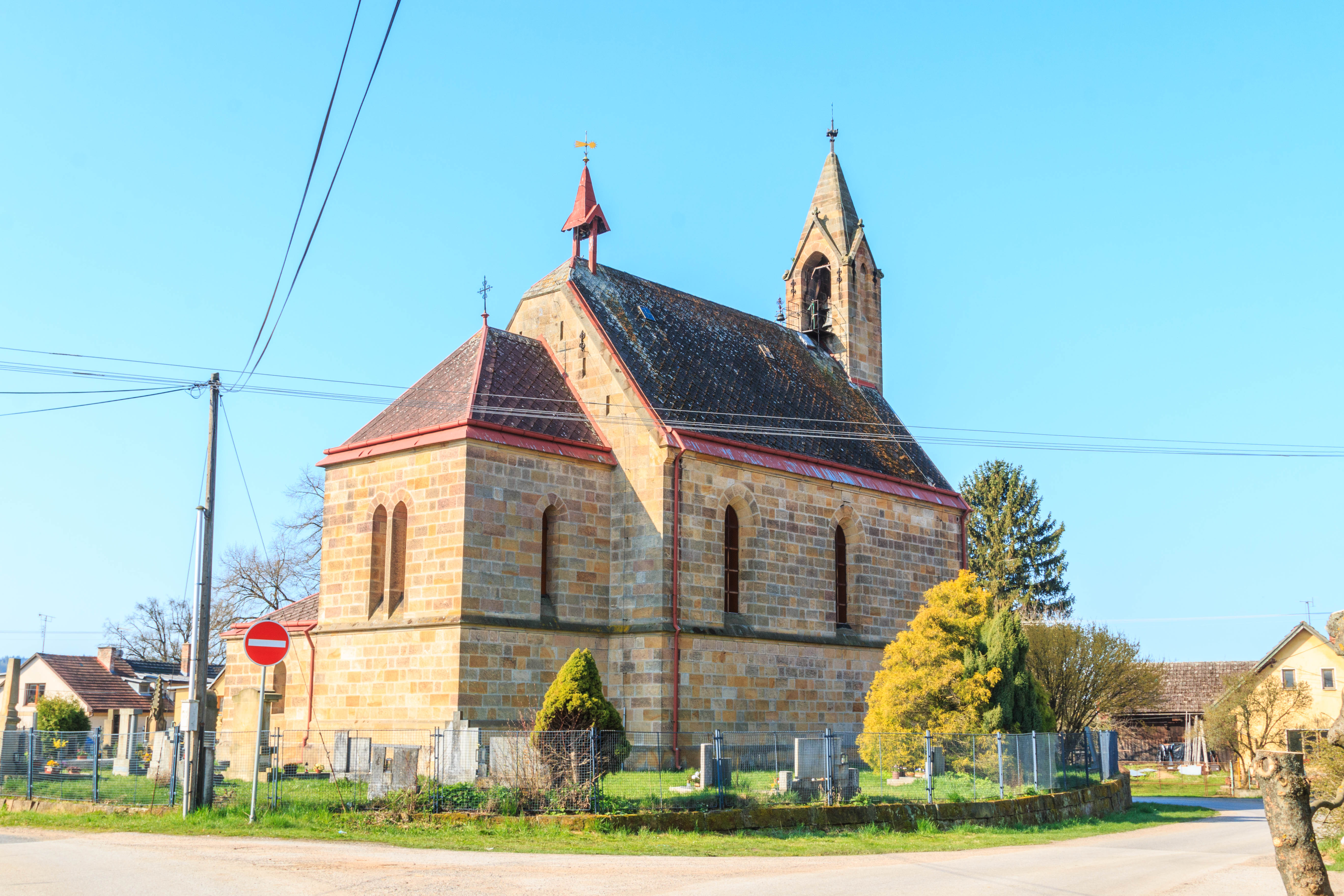
- Church of Saint John the Baptist

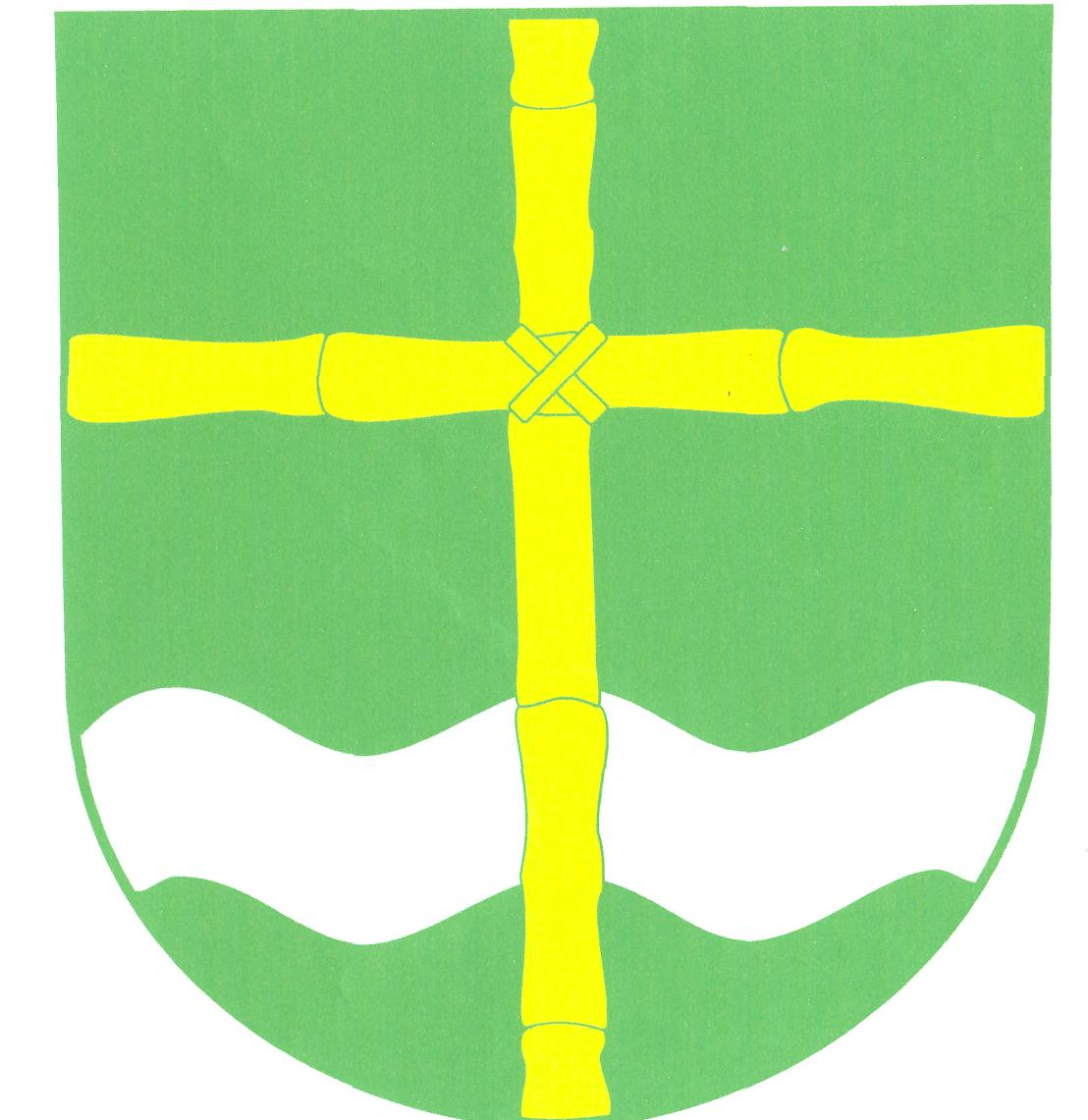
- Flag Coat of arms

- Location in the Czech Republic
- Coordinates: 50°25′34″N 15°32′35″E
- Country: Czech Republic
- Region: Hradec Králové
- District: Jičín
- First mentioned: 1354

Area
  - Total: 5.34 km^{2} (2.06 sq mi)
- Elevation: 321 m (1,053 ft)

Population (2026-01-01)
  - Total: 90
  - Density: 17/km^{2} (44/sq mi)
- Time zone: UTC+1 (CET)
  - Summer (DST): UTC+2 (CEST)
- Postal code: 507 81
- Website: svatojanskyujezd.cz

Svatojanský Újezd is a municipality and village in Jičín District in the Hradec Králové Region of the Czech Republic. It has about 90 inhabitants.

== Demographics ==
Historical population
| Year | Pop. | ±% |
|---|---|---|
| 1869 | 416 | — |
| 1880 | 388 | −6.7% |
| 1890 | 359 | −7.5% |
| 1900 | 308 | −14.2% |
| 1910 | 294 | −4.5% |
| 1921 | 253 | −13.9% |
| 1930 | 252 | −0.4% |
| 1950 | 192 | −23.8% |
| 1961 | 170 | −11.5% |
| 1970 | 124 | −27.1% |
| 1980 | 99 | −20.2% |
| 1991 | 93 | −6.1% |
| 2001 | 74 | −20.4% |
| 2011 | 87 | +17.6% |
| 2021 | 95 | +9.2% |
Source: Censuses
