= Újezd pod Troskami =

- Municipality
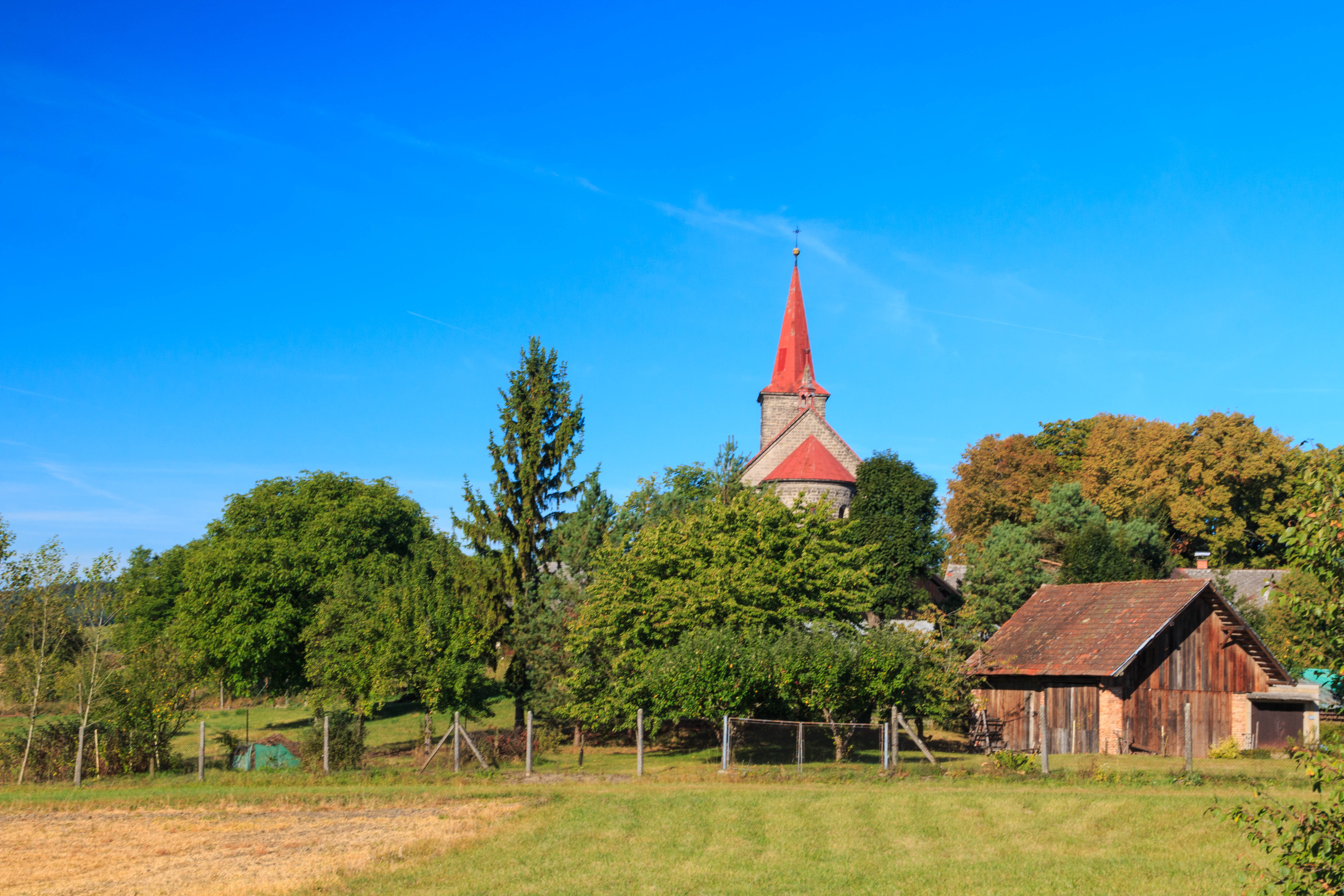
- Church of Saint John the Baptist

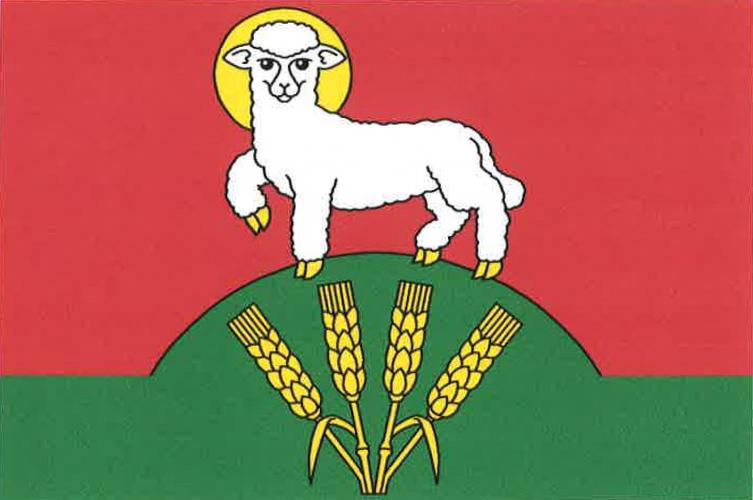
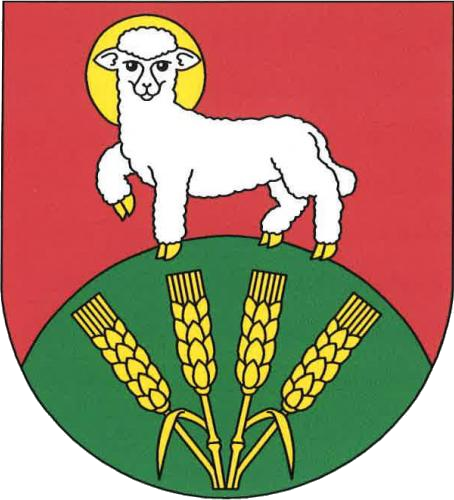
- Flag Coat of arms

- Location in the Czech Republic
- Coordinates: 50°30′24″N 15°15′46″E
- Country: Czech Republic
- Region: Hradec Králové
- District: Jičín
- First mentioned: 1320

Area
  - Total: 7.56 km^{2} (2.92 sq mi)
- Elevation: 300 m (980 ft)

Population (2026-01-01)
  - Total: 329
  - Density: 43.5/km^{2} (113/sq mi)
- Time zone: UTC+1 (CET)
  - Summer (DST): UTC+2 (CEST)
- Postal code: 512 63
- Website: ujezdpodtroskami.cz

Újezd pod Troskami is a municipality and village in Jičín District in the Hradec Králové Region of the Czech Republic. It has about 300 inhabitants.

== Administrative division ==
Újezd pod Troskami consists of four municipal parts (in brackets population according to the 2021 census):

- Újezd pod Troskami (115)
- Čímyšl (23)
- Hrdoňovice (89)
- Semínova Lhota (80)

== Demographics ==
Historical population
Year	Pop.	±%
1869	914	—
1880	951	+4.0%
1890	913	−4.0%
1900	887	−2.8%
1910	852	−3.9%
1921	820	−3.8%
1930	813	−0.9%
1950	602	−26.0%
1961	546	−9.3%
1970	495	−9.3%
1980	356	−28.1%
1991	292	−18.0%
2001	305	+4.5%
2011	308	+1.0%
2021	307	−0.3%
Source: Censuses
