= Pletený Újezd =

- Municipality
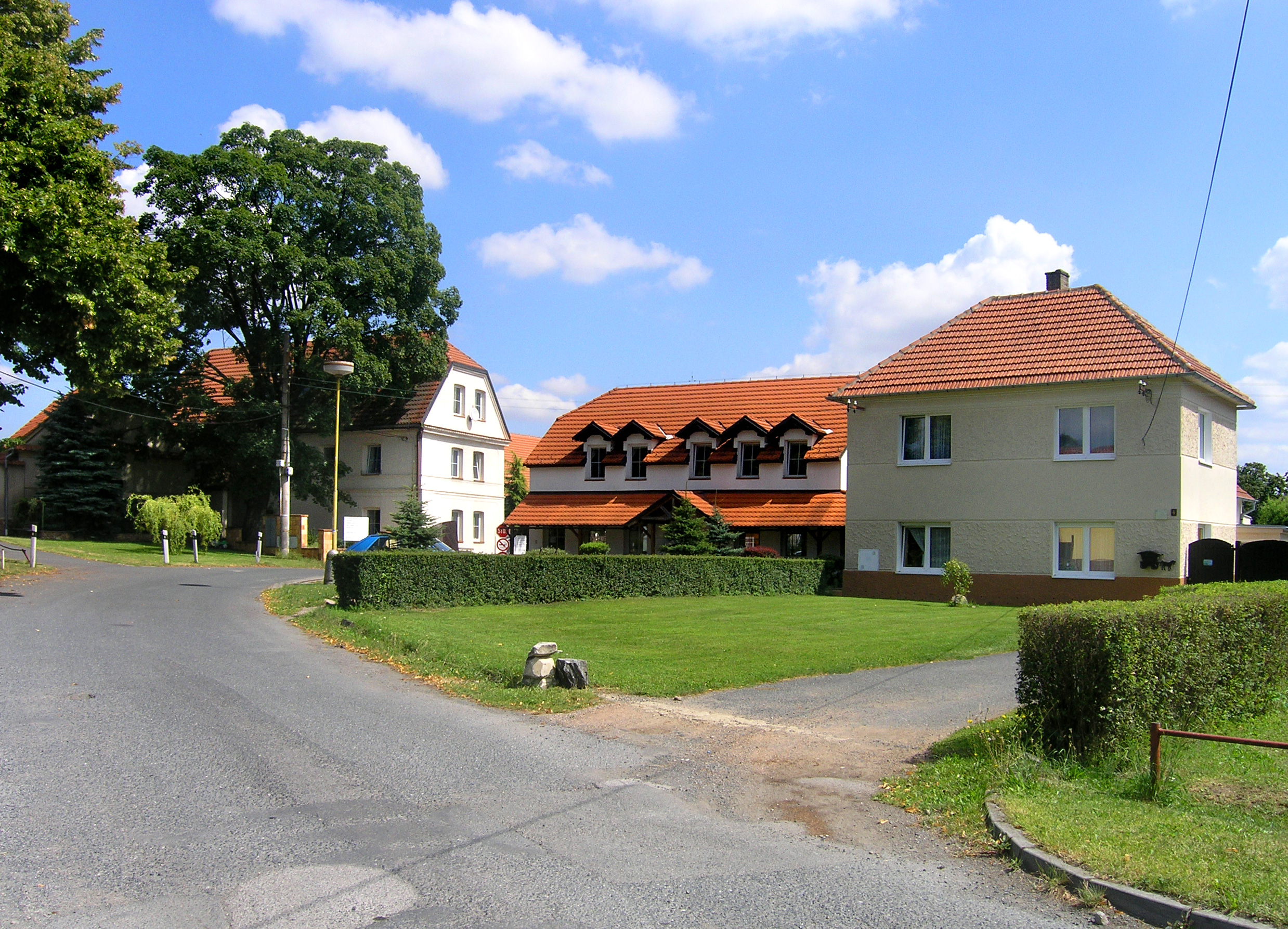
- Družstevní street

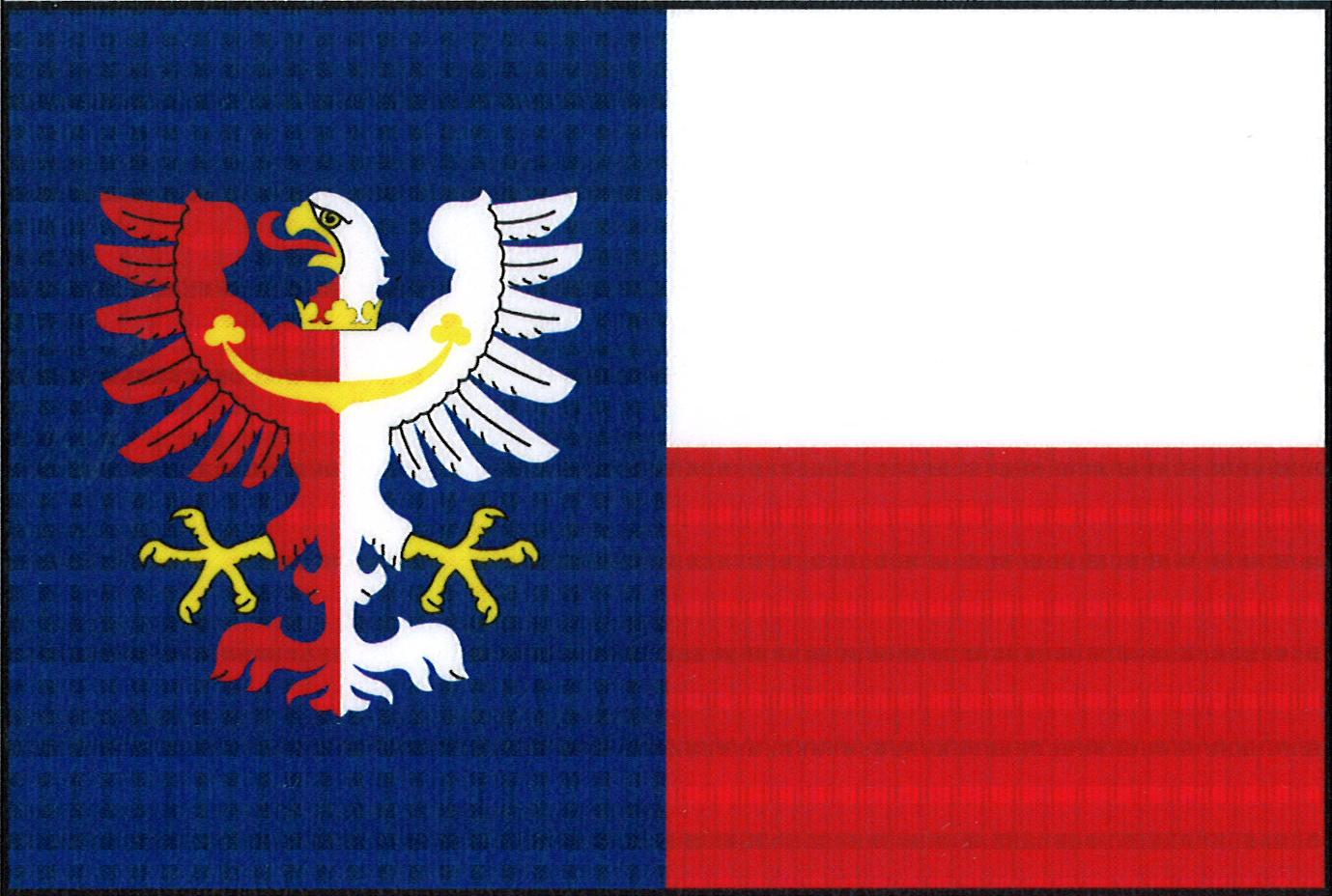
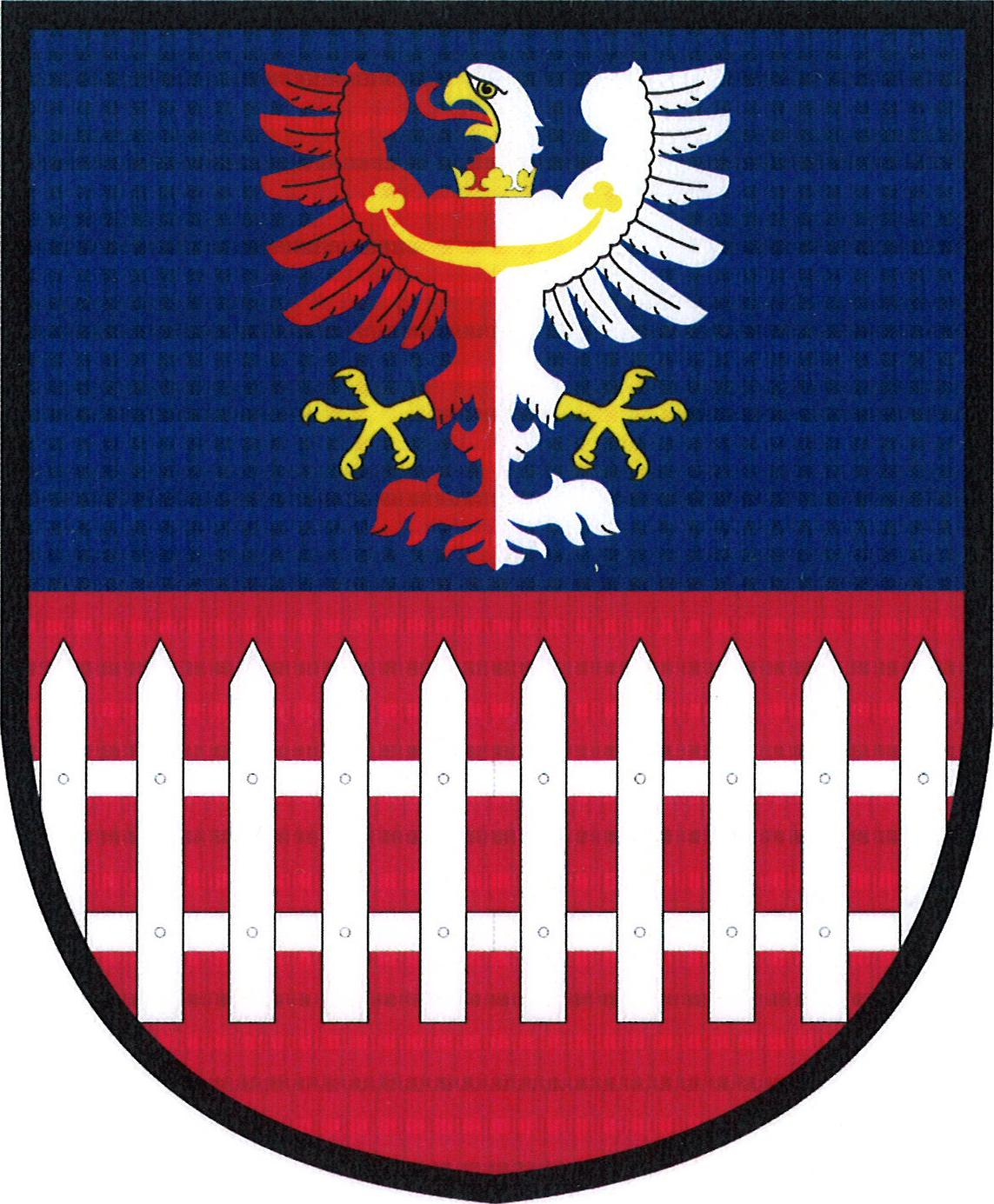
- Flag Coat of arms

- Location in the Czech Republic
- Coordinates: 50°6′34″N 14°6′58″E
- Country: Czech Republic
- Region: Central Bohemian
- District: Kladno
- First mentioned: 1354

Area
  - Total: 1.68 km^{2} (0.65 sq mi)
- Elevation: 406 m (1,332 ft)

Population (2026-01-01)
  - Total: 728
  - Density: 433/km^{2} (1,120/sq mi)
- Time zone: UTC+1 (CET)
  - Summer (DST): UTC+2 (CEST)
- Postal code: 273 51
- Website: www.pletenyujezd.cz

Pletený Újezd is a municipality and village in Kladno District in the Central Bohemian Region of the Czech Republic. It has about 700 inhabitants.

== Demographics ==
Historical population
Year	Pop.	±%
1869	209	—
1880	290	+38.8%
1890	364	+25.5%
1900	431	+18.4%
1910	530	+23.0%
1921	490	−7.5%
1930	613	+25.1%
1950	573	−6.5%
1961	536	−6.5%
1970	509	−5.0%
1980	482	−5.3%
1991	400	−17.0%
2001	401	+0.2%
2011	486	+21.2%
2021	636	+30.9%
Source: Censuses
