= Újezd u Tišnova =

- Municipality
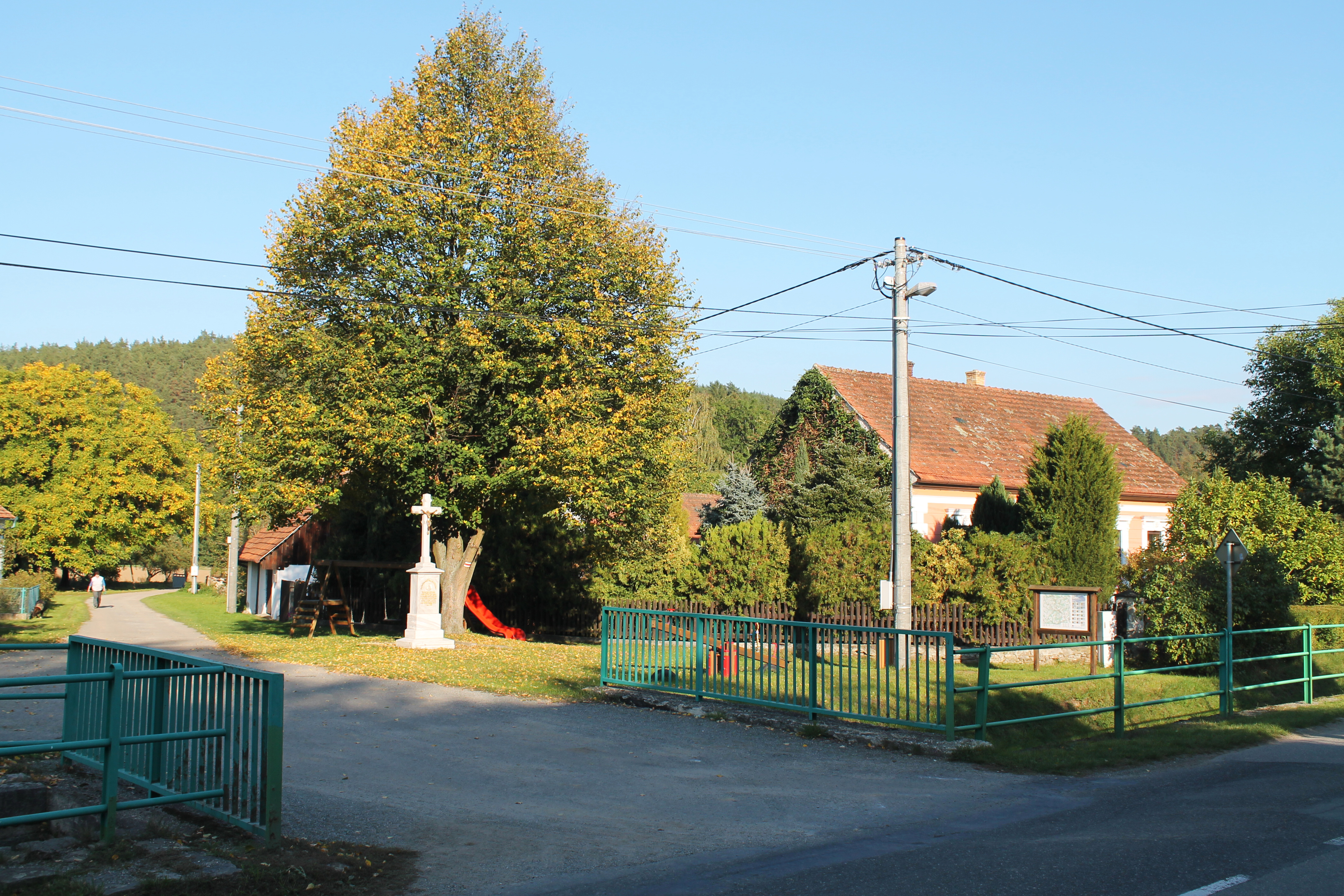
- Centre of Újezd u Tišnova

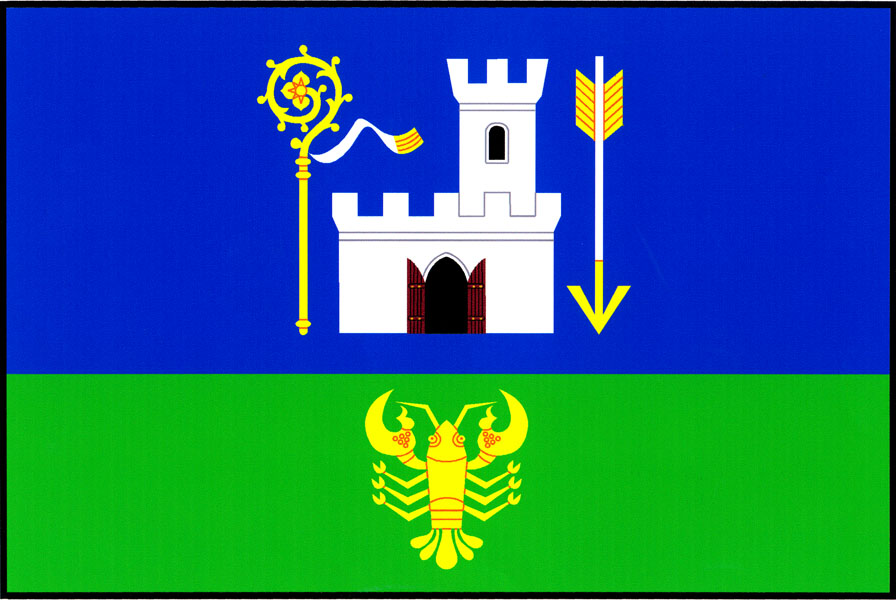
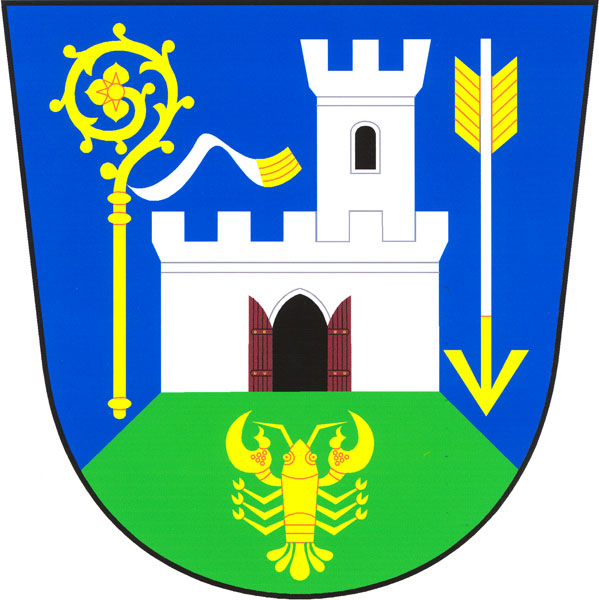
- Flag Coat of arms

- Location in the Czech Republic
- Coordinates: 49°21′56″N 16°19′28″E
- Country: Czech Republic
- Region: South Moravian
- District: Brno-Country
- First mentioned: 1334

Area
  - Total: 3.59 km^{2} (1.39 sq mi)
- Elevation: 303 m (994 ft)

Population (2026-01-01)
  - Total: 151
  - Density: 42.1/km^{2} (109/sq mi)
- Time zone: UTC+1 (CET)
  - Summer (DST): UTC+2 (CEST)
- Postal code: 594 55
- Website: www.ujezdutisnova.cz

Újezd u Tišnova is a municipality and village in Brno-Country District in the South Moravian Region of the Czech Republic. It has about 200 inhabitants.

Újezd u Tišnova lies approximately 29 kilometres (18 mi) north-west of Brno and 159 km (99 mi) south-east of Prague.

== Demographics ==
Historical population
| Year | Pop. | ±% |
|---|---|---|
| 1869 | 157 | — |
| 1880 | 164 | +4.5% |
| 1890 | 190 | +15.9% |
| 1900 | 235 | +23.7% |
| 1910 | 251 | +6.8% |
| 1921 | 239 | −4.8% |
| 1930 | 225 | −5.9% |
| 1950 | 202 | −10.2% |
| 1961 | 197 | −2.5% |
| 1970 | 182 | −7.6% |
| 1980 | 148 | −18.7% |
| 1991 | 109 | −26.4% |
| 2001 | 116 | +6.4% |
| 2011 | 125 | +7.8% |
| 2021 | 134 | +7.2% |
Source: Censuses
