= Újezd u Rosic =

- Municipality
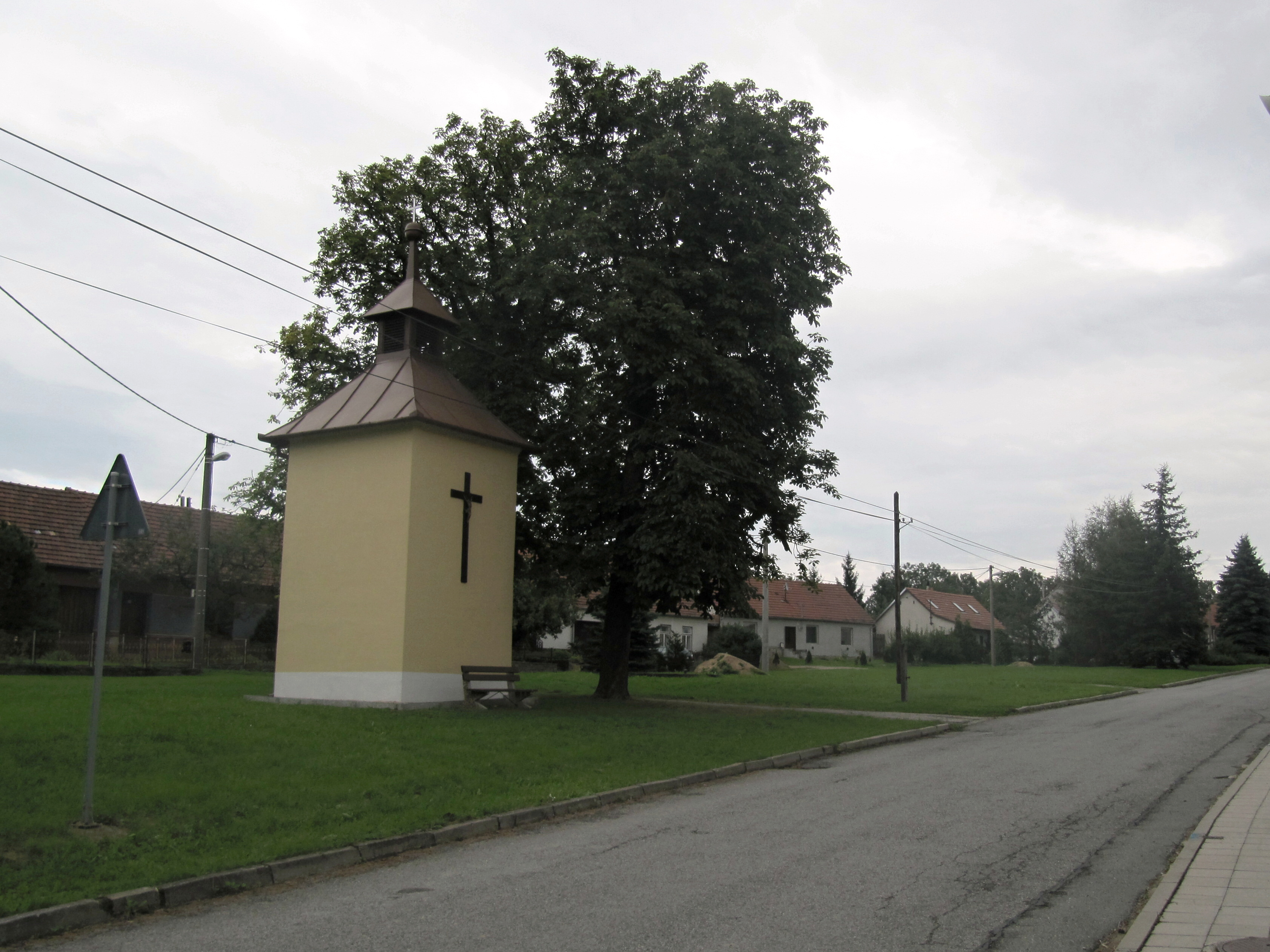
- Centre of the village with a belfry

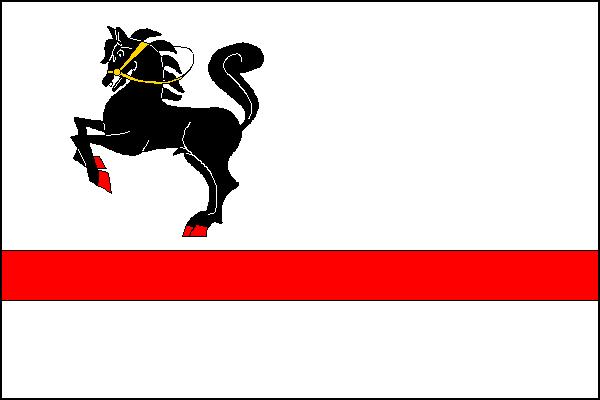
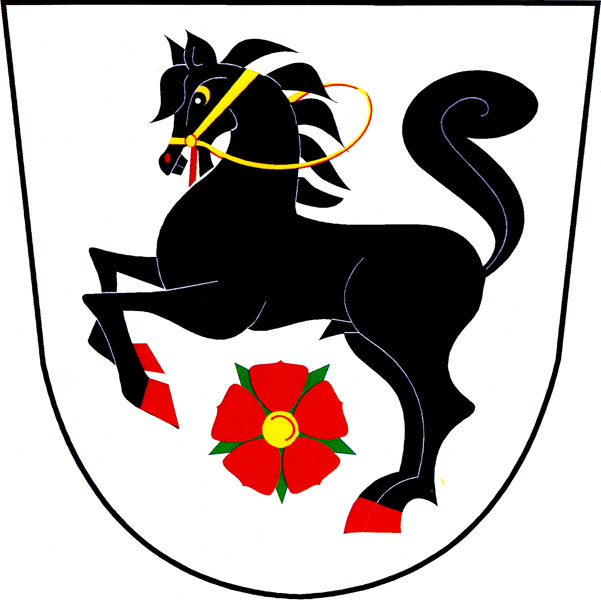
- Flag Coat of arms

- Location in the Czech Republic
- Coordinates: 49°13′21″N 16°15′13″E
- Country: Czech Republic
- Region: South Moravian
- District: Brno-Country
- First mentioned: 1353

Area
  - Total: 10.91 km^{2} (4.21 sq mi)
- Elevation: 490 m (1,610 ft)

Population (2026-01-01)
  - Total: 277
  - Density: 25.4/km^{2} (65.8/sq mi)
- Time zone: UTC+1 (CET)
  - Summer (DST): UTC+2 (CEST)
- Postal code: 664 84
- Website: www.ujezdurosic.cz

Újezd u Rosic is a municipality and village in Brno-Country District in the South Moravian Region of the Czech Republic. It has about 300 inhabitants.

Újezd u Rosic lies approximately 26 kilometres (16 mi) west of Brno and 165 km (103 mi) south-east of Prague.

== Demographics ==
Historical population
Year	Pop.	±%
1869	385	—
1880	420	+9.1%
1890	445	+6.0%
1900	469	+5.4%
1910	483	+3.0%
1921	490	+1.4%
1930	455	−7.1%
1950	427	−6.2%
1961	415	−2.8%
1970	403	−2.9%
1980	317	−21.3%
1991	257	−18.9%
2001	228	−11.3%
2011	269	+18.0%
2021	278	+3.3%
Source: Censuses
