= Drahoňův Újezd =

- Municipality
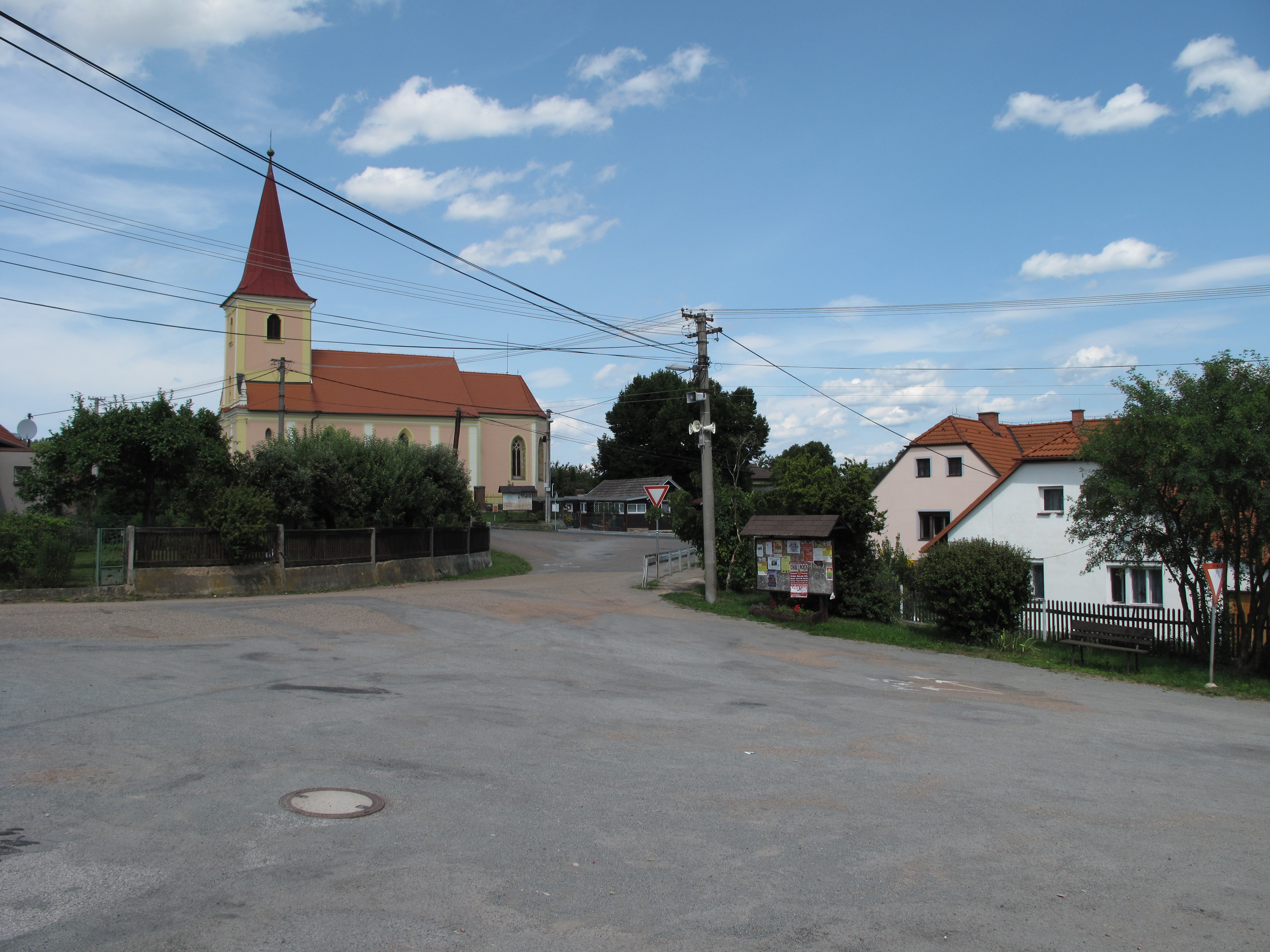
- Church of Saint James the Great

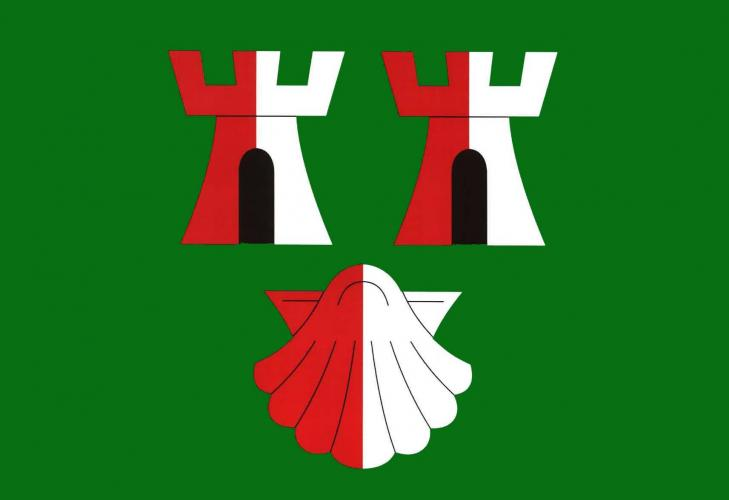
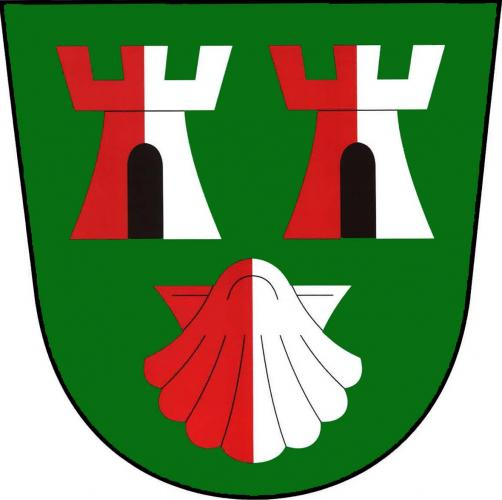
- Flag Coat of arms

- Location in the Czech Republic
- Coordinates: 49°52′38″N 13°43′33″E
- Country: Czech Republic
- Region: Plzeň
- District: Rokycany
- First mentioned: 1352

Area
  - Total: 13.99 km^{2} (5.40 sq mi)
- Elevation: 410 m (1,350 ft)

Population (2026-01-01)
  - Total: 131
  - Density: 9.36/km^{2} (24.3/sq mi)
- Time zone: UTC+1 (CET)
  - Summer (DST): UTC+2 (CEST)
- Postal code: 338 08
- Website: www.drahonuv-ujezd.cz

Drahoňův Újezd is a municipality and village in Rokycany District in the Plzeň Region of the Czech Republic. It has about 100 inhabitants.

Drahoňův Újezd lies approximately 16 kilometres (10 mi) north-east of Rokycany, 28 km (17 mi) north-east of Plzeň, and 57 km (35 mi) south-west of Prague.

== History ==
From 1 April 1980 to 31 December 1992, Drahoňův Újezd was a municipal part of Zbiroh.

== Demographics ==
Historical population
Year	Pop.	±%
1869	335	—
1880	308	−8.1%
1890	285	−7.5%
1900	268	−6.0%
1910	266	−0.7%
1921	237	−10.9%
1930	260	+9.7%
1950	210	−19.2%
1961	199	−5.2%
1970	165	−17.1%
1980	162	−1.8%
1991	130	−19.8%
2001	144	+10.8%
2011	125	−13.2%
2021	131	+4.8%
Source: Censuses
