= Újezd (Žďár nad Sázavou District) =

- Municipality
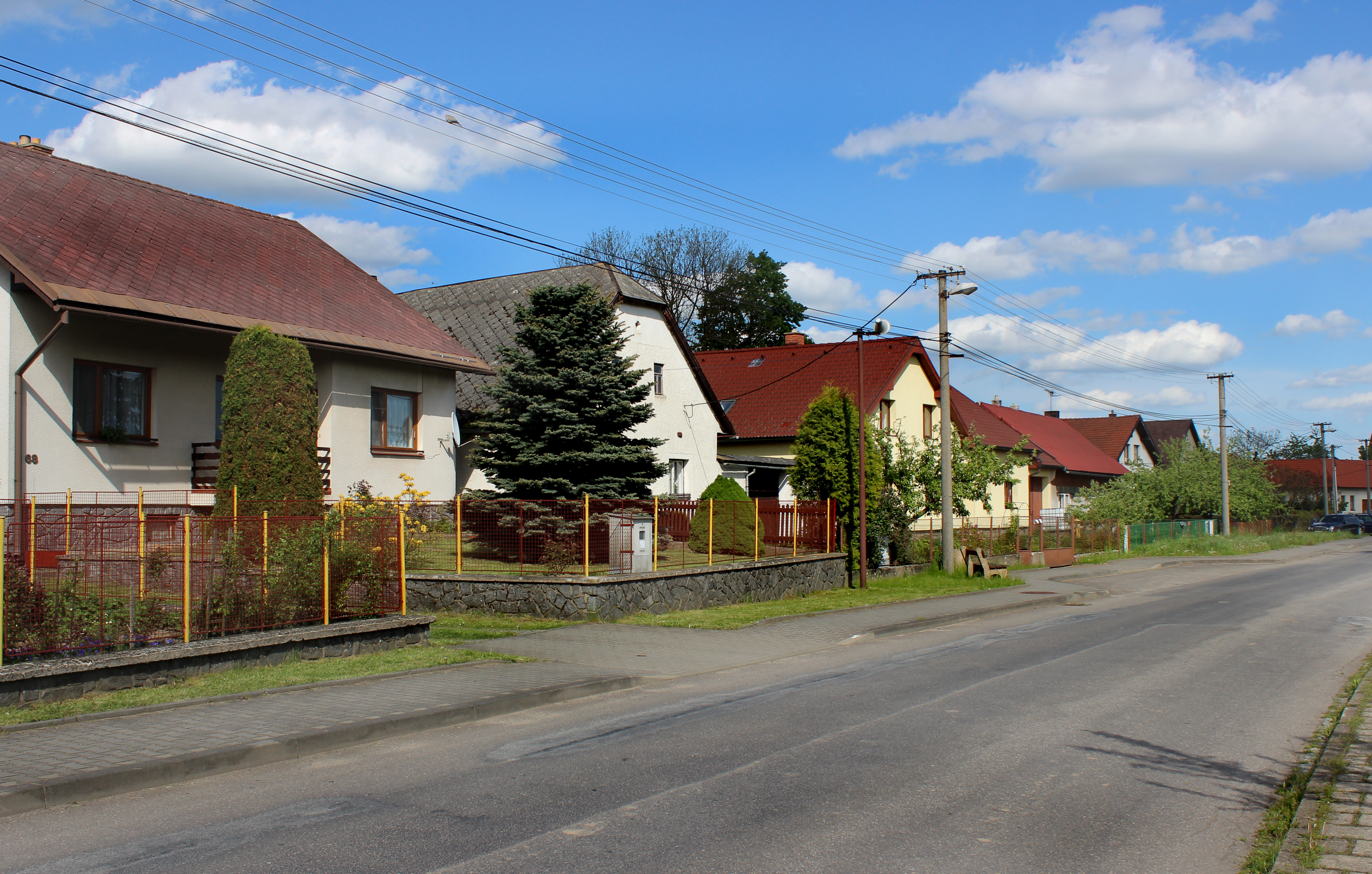
- Main street

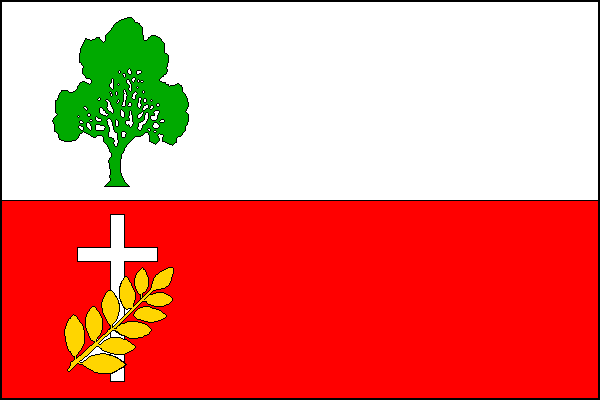
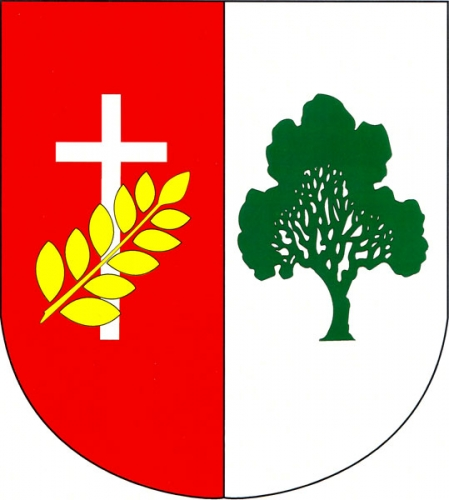
- Flag Coat of arms

- Location in the Czech Republic
- Coordinates: 49°30′33″N 15°52′13″E
- Country: Czech Republic
- Region: Vysočina
- District: Žďár nad Sázavou
- First mentioned: 1447

Area
  - Total: 8.68 km^{2} (3.35 sq mi)
- Elevation: 576 m (1,890 ft)

Population (2026-01-01)
  - Total: 302
  - Density: 34.8/km^{2} (90.1/sq mi)
- Time zone: UTC+1 (CET)
  - Summer (DST): UTC+2 (CEST)
- Postal code: 592 12
- Website: www.ujezduzdaru.cz

Újezd is a municipality and village in Žďár nad Sázavou District in the Vysočina Region of the Czech Republic. It has about 300 inhabitants.

Újezd lies approximately 9 kilometres (6 mi) south-west of Žďár nad Sázavou, 24 km (15 mi) north-east of Jihlava, and 123 km (76 mi) south-east of Prague.

== Demographics ==
Historical population
Year	Pop.	±%
1869	276	—
1880	322	+16.7%
1890	327	+1.6%
1900	321	−1.8%
1910	312	−2.8%
1921	302	−3.2%
1930	313	+3.6%
1950	248	−20.8%
1961	295	+19.0%
1970	273	−7.5%
1980	244	−10.6%
1991	249	+2.0%
2001	239	−4.0%
2011	238	−0.4%
2021	263	+10.5%
Source: Censuses
