= Újezd u Plánice =

- Municipality
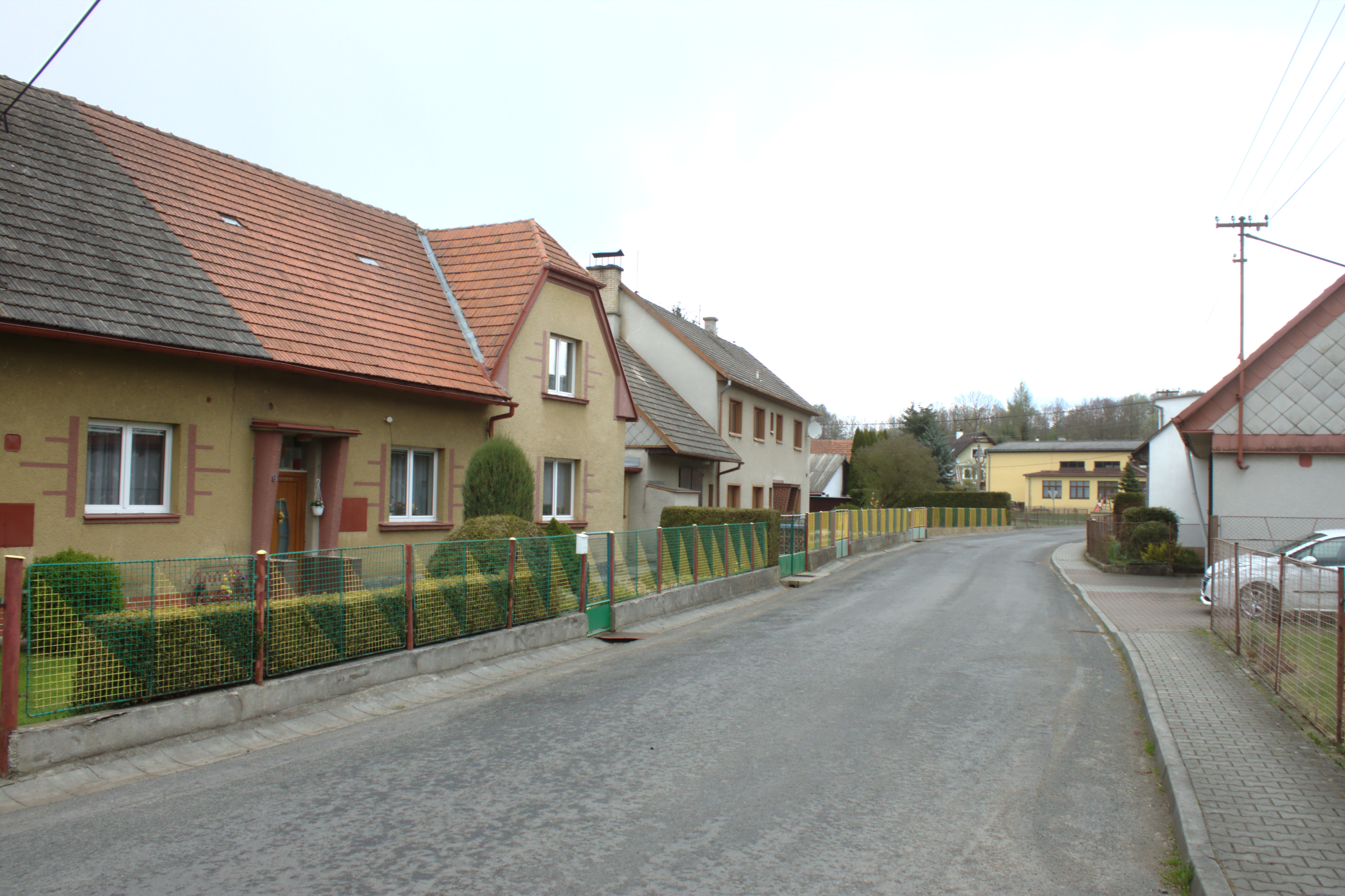
- Main street

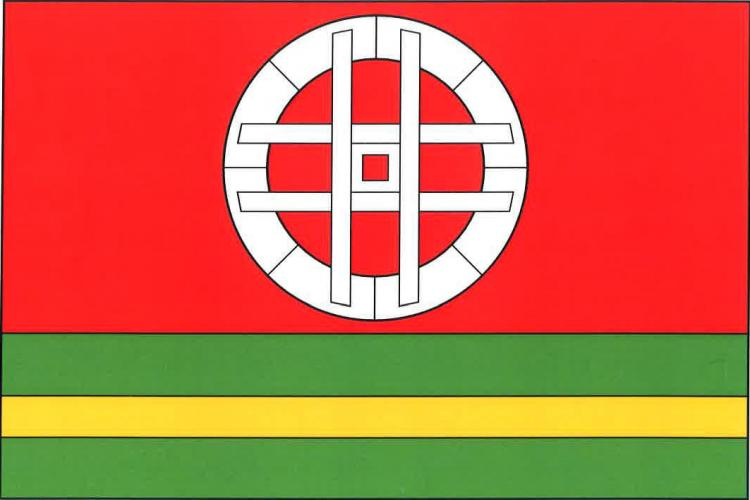
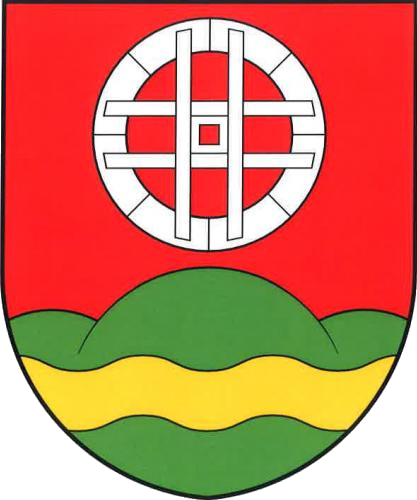
- Flag Coat of arms

- Location in the Czech Republic
- Coordinates: 49°25′3″N 13°27′28″E
- Country: Czech Republic
- Region: Plzeň
- District: Klatovy
- First mentioned: 1551

Area
  - Total: 4.74 km^{2} (1.83 sq mi)
- Elevation: 512 m (1,680 ft)

Population (2026-01-01)
  - Total: 123
  - Density: 25.9/km^{2} (67.2/sq mi)
- Time zone: UTC+1 (CET)
  - Summer (DST): UTC+2 (CEST)
- Postal code: 339 01
- Website: www.ouujezd.cz

Újezd u Plánice is a municipality and village in Klatovy District in the Plzeň Region of the Czech Republic. It has about 100 inhabitants.

Újezd u Plánice lies approximately 13 kilometres (8 mi) east of Klatovy, 38 km (24 mi) south of Plzeň, and 102 km (63 mi) south-west of Prague.

== Demographics ==
Historical population
Year	Pop.	±%
1869	450	—
1880	469	+4.2%
1890	508	+8.3%
1900	505	−0.6%
1910	513	+1.6%
1921	534	+4.1%
1930	446	−16.5%
1950	309	−30.7%
1961	302	−2.3%
1970	220	−27.2%
1980	196	−10.9%
1991	168	−14.3%
2001	121	−28.0%
2011	104	−14.0%
2021	122	+17.3%
Source: Censuses
