= Ostrolovský Újezd =

- Municipality
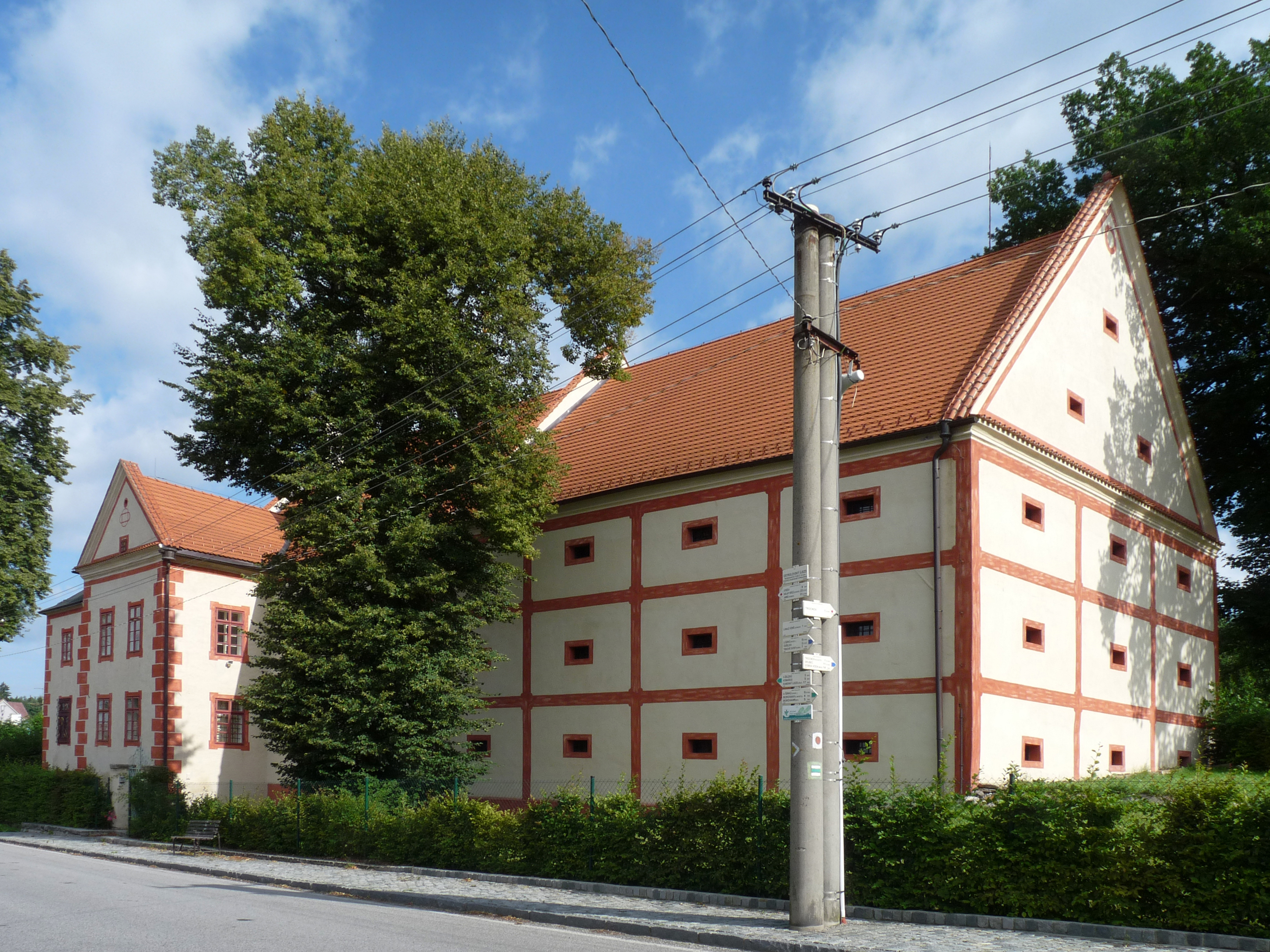
- Ostrolovský Újezd Castle

- Location in the Czech Republic
- Coordinates: 48°52′50″N 14°36′2″E
- Country: Czech Republic
- Region: South Bohemian
- District: České Budějovice
- First mentioned: 1381

Area
  - Total: 3.83 km^{2} (1.48 sq mi)
- Elevation: 471 m (1,545 ft)

Population (2026-01-01)
  - Total: 188
  - Density: 49.1/km^{2} (127/sq mi)
- Time zone: UTC+1 (CET)
  - Summer (DST): UTC+2 (CEST)
- Postal code: 374 01
- Website: www.ostrolovskyujezd.cz

Ostrolovský Újezd (until 1948 Újezd Ostrolov) is a municipality and village in České Budějovice District in the South Bohemian Region of the Czech Republic. It has about 200 inhabitants.

Ostrolovský Újezd lies approximately 14 kilometres (9 mi) south-east of České Budějovice and 135 km (84 mi) south of Prague.

== Demographics ==
Historical population
Year	Pop.	±%
1869	236	—
1880	246	+4.2%
1890	255	+3.7%
1900	232	−9.0%
1910	254	+9.5%
1921	217	−14.6%
1930	196	−9.7%
1950	162	−17.3%
1961	184	+13.6%
1970	146	−20.7%
1980	102	−30.1%
1991	93	−8.8%
2001	109	+17.2%
2011	163	+49.5%
2021	175	+7.4%
Source: Censuses
