= Horšice =

- Municipality
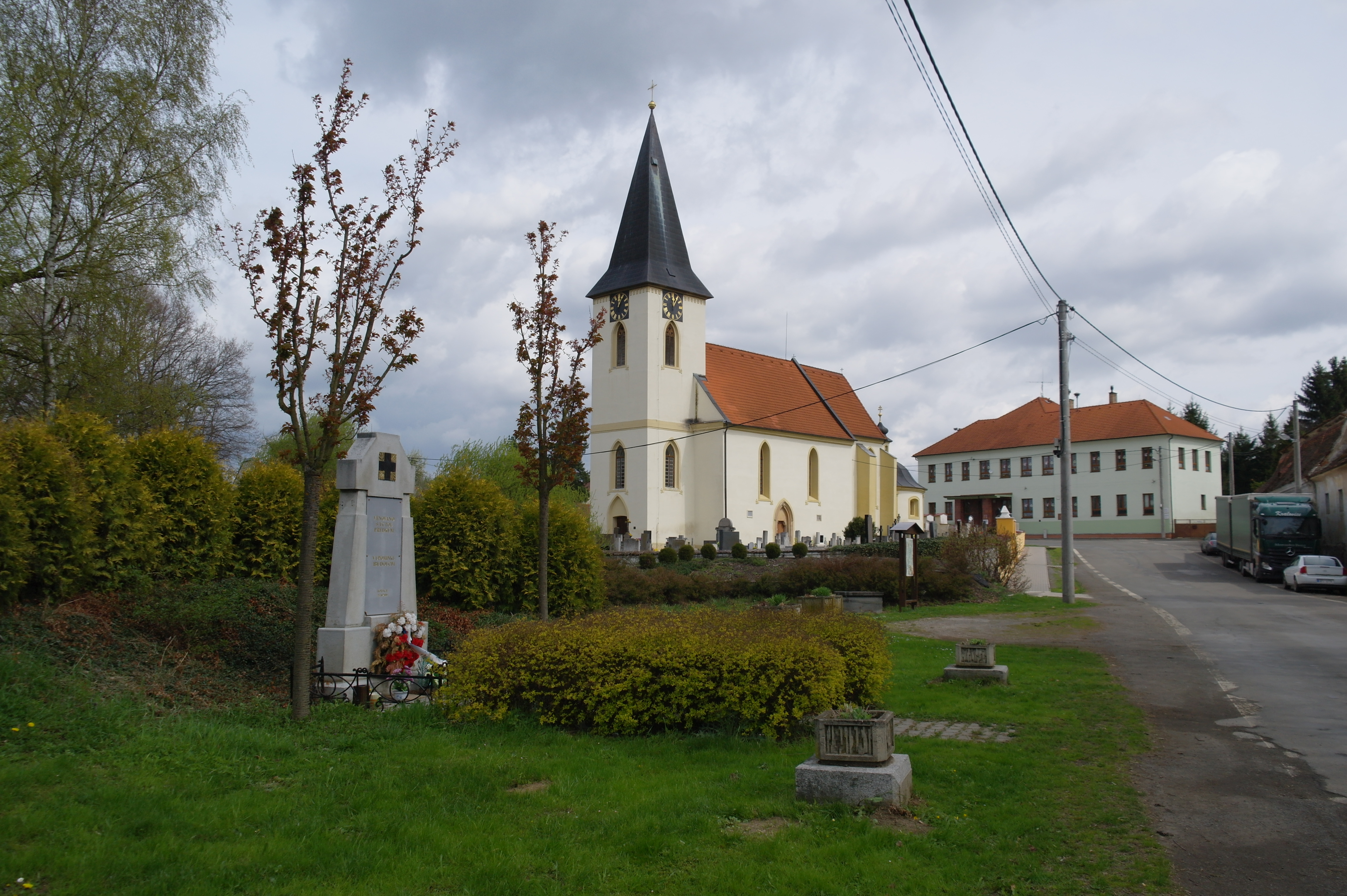
- Church of Saint Matthias and school

- Flag Coat of arms

- Location in the Czech Republic
- Coordinates: 49°31′54″N 13°23′10″E
- Country: Czech Republic
- Region: Plzeň
- District: Plzeň-South
- First mentioned: 1245

Area
  - Total: 9.71 km^{2} (3.75 sq mi)
- Elevation: 425 m (1,394 ft)

Population (2026-01-01)
  - Total: 428
  - Density: 44.1/km^{2} (114/sq mi)
- Time zone: UTC+1 (CET)
  - Summer (DST): UTC+2 (CEST)
- Postal codes: 334 01, 334 55
- Website: www.obec-horsice.cz

Horšice is a municipality and village in Plzeň-South District in the Plzeň Region of the Czech Republic. It has about 400 inhabitants.

Horšice lies approximately 24 kilometres (15 mi) south of Plzeň and 97 km (60 mi) south-west of Prague.

== Administrative division ==
Horšice consists of two municipal parts (in brackets population according to the 2021 census):

- Horšice (283)
- Újezd (119)

== Demographics ==
Historical population
Year	Pop.	±%
1869	826	—
1880	824	−0.2%
1890	747	−9.3%
1900	724	−3.1%
1910	795	+9.8%
1921	726	−8.7%
1930	742	+2.2%
1950	566	−23.7%
1961	506	−10.6%
1970	456	−9.9%
1980	379	−16.9%
1991	326	−14.0%
2001	389	+19.3%
2011	394	+1.3%
2021	402	+2.0%
Source: Censuses
