= Dolní Újezd (Přerov District) =

- Municipality
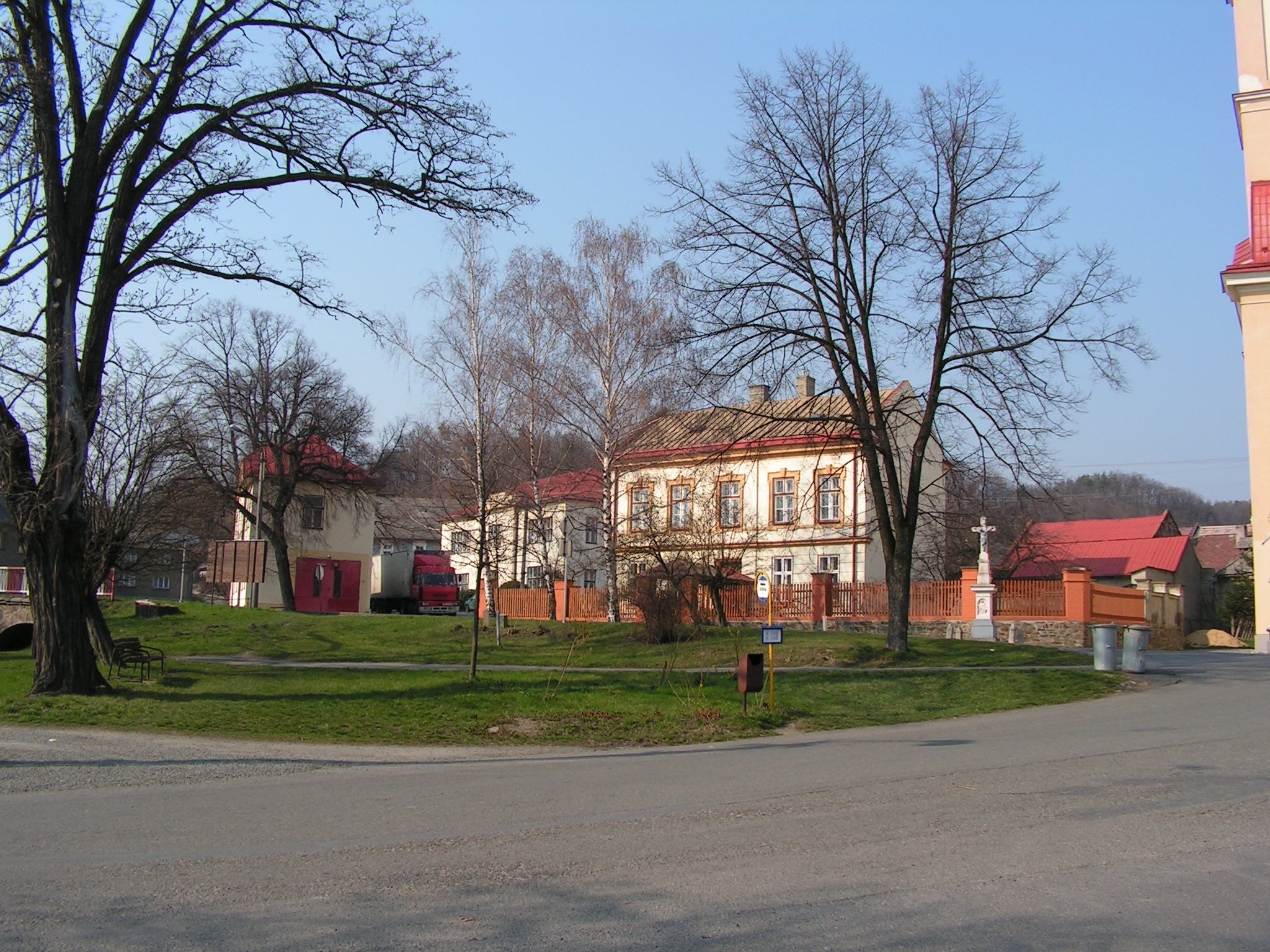
- Common in Dolní Újezd

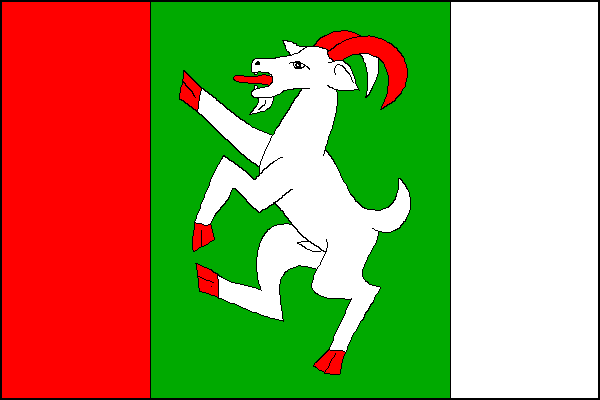
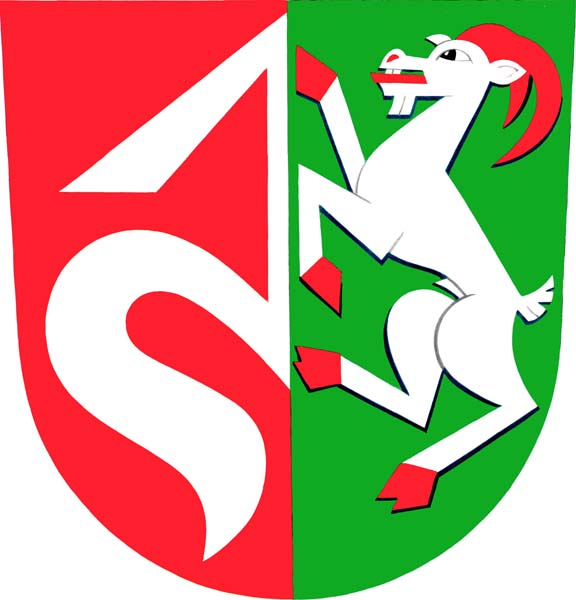
- Flag Coat of arms

- Location in the Czech Republic
- Coordinates: 49°32′46″N 17°32′8″E
- Country: Czech Republic
- Region: Olomouc
- District: Přerov
- First mentioned: 1322

Area
  - Total: 7.93 km^{2} (3.06 sq mi)
- Elevation: 285 m (935 ft)

Population (2026-01-01)
  - Total: 1,224
  - Density: 154/km^{2} (400/sq mi)
- Time zone: UTC+1 (CET)
  - Summer (DST): UTC+2 (CEST)
- Postal codes: 751 23, 751 25
- Website: www.dolni-ujezd.cz

Dolní Újezd is a municipality and village in Přerov District in the Olomouc Region of the Czech Republic. It has about 1,200 inhabitants.

Dolní Újezd lies approximately 12 kilometres (7 mi) north-east of Přerov, 22 km (14 mi) east of Olomouc, and 233 km (145 mi) east of Prague.

== Administrative division ==
Dolní Újezd consists of three municipal parts (in brackets population according to the 2021 census):

- Dolní Újezd (524)
- Skoky (337)
- Staměřice (291)

== Demographics ==
Historical population
Year	Pop.	±%
1869	1,010	—
1880	1,117	+10.6%
1890	1,097	−1.8%
1900	1,106	+0.8%
1910	1,106	+0.0%
1921	1,108	+0.2%
1930	1,205	+8.8%
1950	1,050	−12.9%
1961	1,172	+11.6%
1970	1,119	−4.5%
1980	1,110	−0.8%
1991	1,058	−4.7%
2001	1,134	+7.2%
2011	1,153	+1.7%
2021	1,152	−0.1%
Source: Censuses
