= Újezd (Zlín District) =

- Municipality
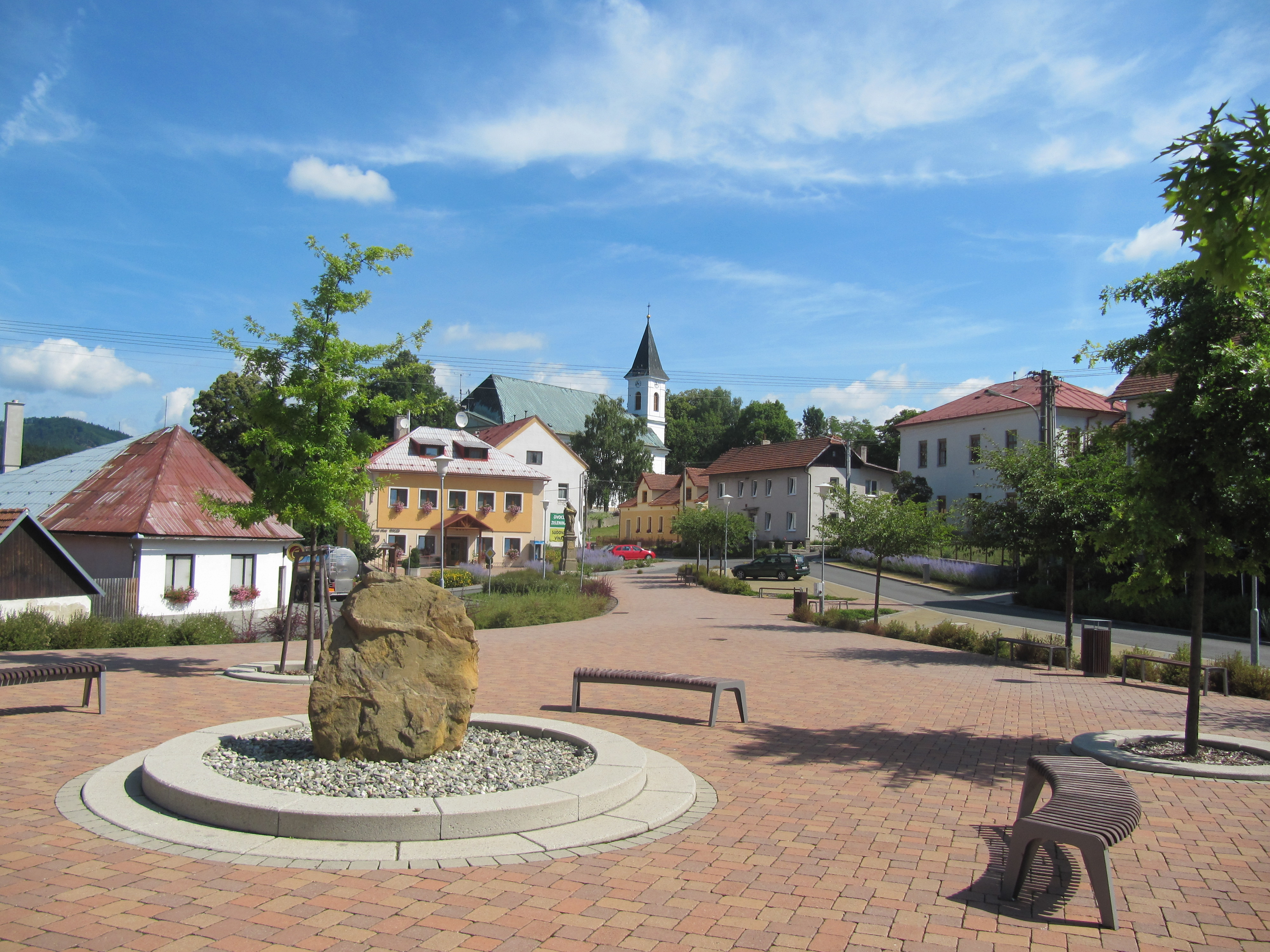
- Centre of Újezd

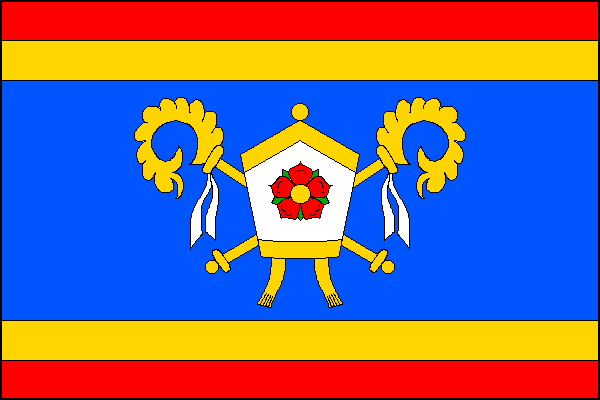
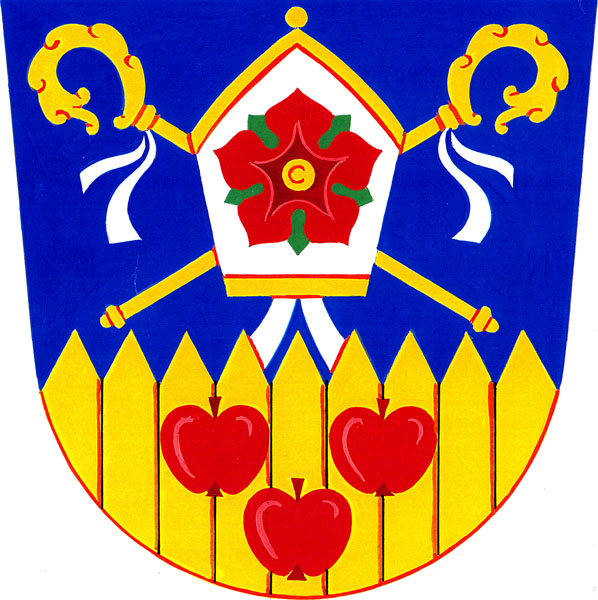
- Flag Coat of arms

- Location in the Czech Republic
- Coordinates: 49°10′5″N 17°54′22″E
- Country: Czech Republic
- Region: Zlín
- District: Zlín
- First mentioned: 1261

Area
  - Total: 12.41 km^{2} (4.79 sq mi)
- Elevation: 434 m (1,424 ft)

Population (2026-01-01)
  - Total: 1,189
  - Density: 95.81/km^{2} (248.1/sq mi)
- Time zone: UTC+1 (CET)
  - Summer (DST): UTC+2 (CEST)
- Postal code: 763 25
- Website: www.ujezdvk.com

Újezd is a municipality and village in Zlín District in the Zlín Region of the Czech Republic. It has about 1,200 inhabitants.

Újezd lies approximately 19 kilometres (12 mi) east of Zlín and 272 km (169 mi) east of Prague.

== Demographics ==
Historical population
Year	Pop.	±%
1869	782	—
1880	807	+3.2%
1890	831	+3.0%
1900	937	+12.8%
1910	1,042	+11.2%
1921	1,007	−3.4%
1930	1,010	+0.3%
1950	1,058	+4.8%
1961	1,266	+19.7%
1970	1,194	−5.7%
1980	1,155	−3.3%
1991	1,179	+2.1%
2001	1,222	+3.6%
2011	1,150	−5.9%
2021	1,143	−0.6%
Source: Censuses
