= Újezd u Sezemic =

- Municipality
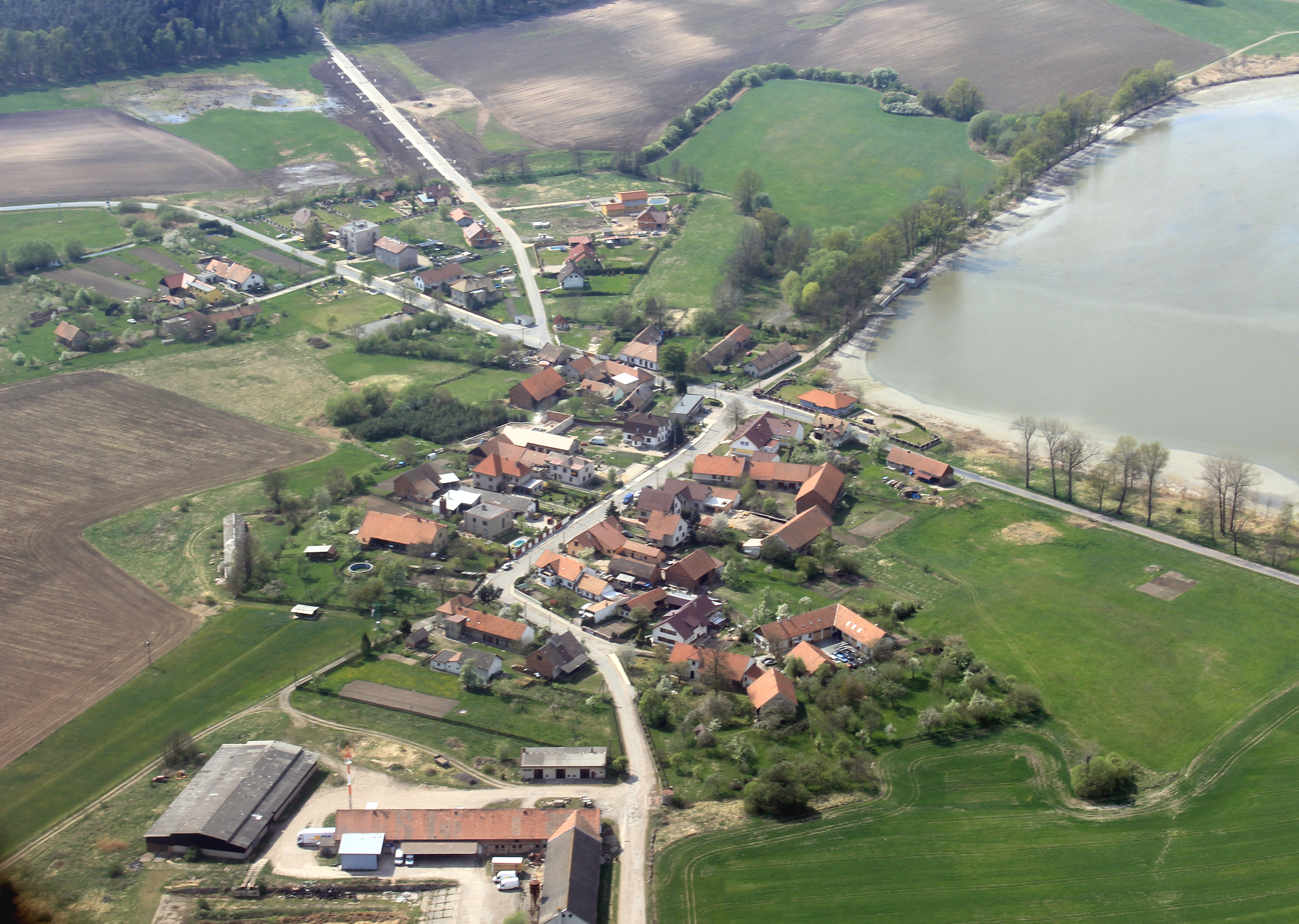
- Aerial view

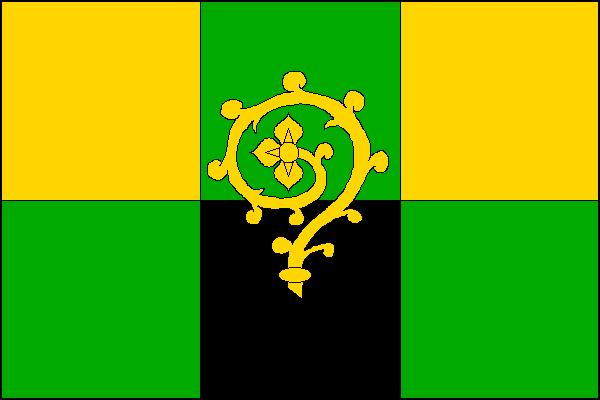
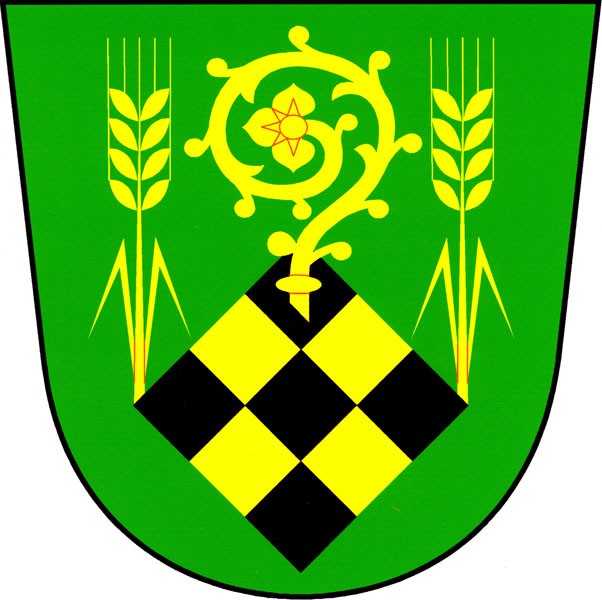
- Flag Coat of arms

- Location in the Czech Republic
- Coordinates: 50°6′51″N 15°51′21″E
- Country: Czech Republic
- Region: Pardubice
- District: Pardubice
- First mentioned: 1436

Area
  - Total: 3.46 km^{2} (1.34 sq mi)
- Elevation: 236 m (774 ft)

Population (2026-01-01)
  - Total: 236
  - Density: 68.2/km^{2} (177/sq mi)
- Time zone: UTC+1 (CET)
  - Summer (DST): UTC+2 (CEST)
- Postal code: 533 04
- Website: www.ujezdusezemic.cz

Újezd u Sezemic (Czech pronunciation: [ˈuːjɛst u ˈsɛzɛmɪts]) is a municipality and village in Pardubice District in the Pardubice Region of the Czech Republic. It has about 200 inhabitants.

== Administrative division ==
Újezd u Sezemic consists of two municipal parts (in brackets population according to the 2021 census):

- Újezd u Sezemic (198)
- Zástava (9)

== Demographics ==
Historical population
Year	Pop.	±%
1869	197	—
1880	252	+27.9%
1890	250	−0.8%
1900	207	−17.2%
1910	216	+4.3%
1921	211	−2.3%
1930	198	−6.2%
1950	167	−15.7%
1961	160	−4.2%
1970	145	−9.4%
1980	154	+6.2%
1991	137	−11.0%
2001	115	−16.1%
2011	126	+9.6%
2021	207	+64.3%
Source: Censuses
