= Újezd nade Mží =

- Municipality
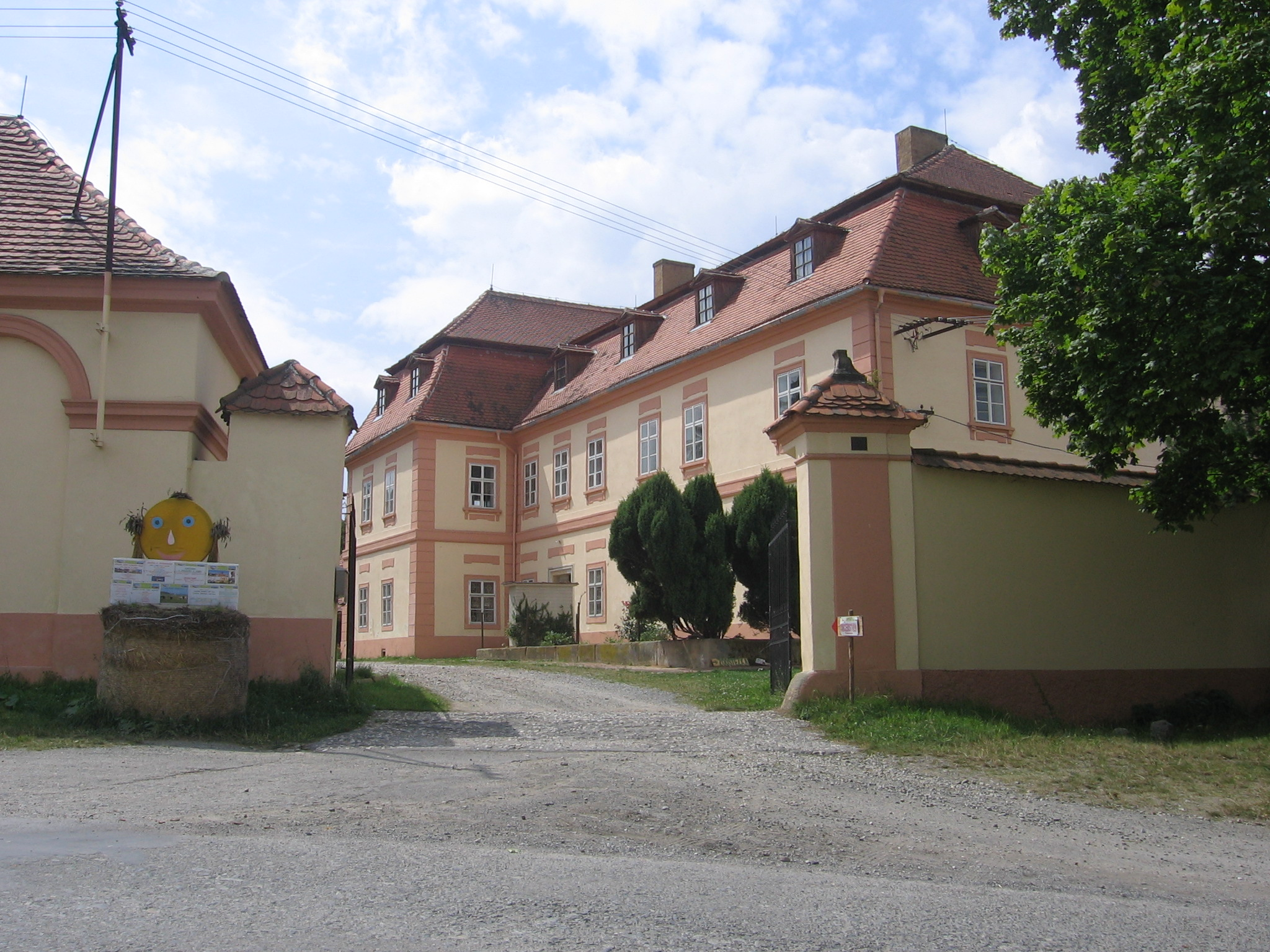
- Újezd nade Mží Castle

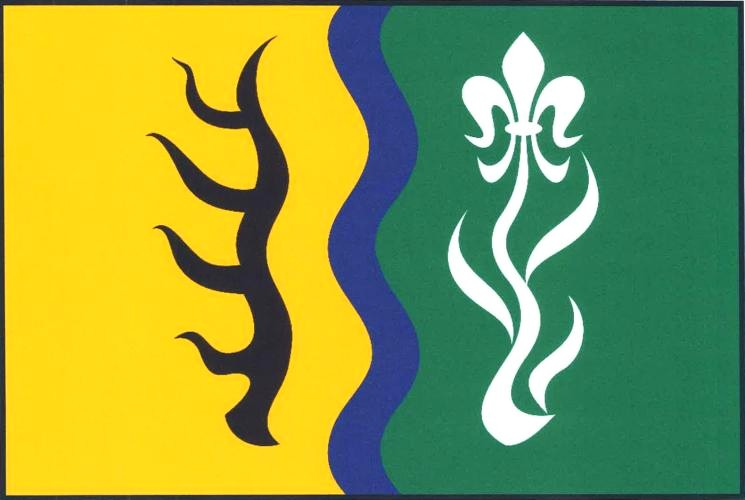
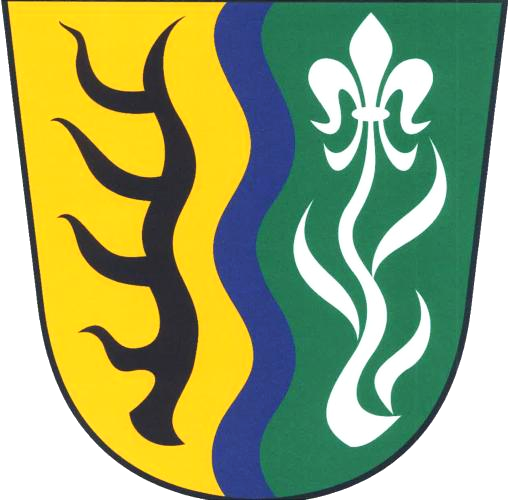
- Flag Coat of arms

- Location in the Czech Republic
- Coordinates: 49°47′20″N 13°11′42″E
- Country: Czech Republic
- Region: Plzeň
- District: Plzeň-North
- First mentioned: 1242

Area
  - Total: 8.46 km^{2} (3.27 sq mi)
- Elevation: 392 m (1,286 ft)

Population (2026-01-01)
  - Total: 116
  - Density: 13.7/km^{2} (35.5/sq mi)
- Time zone: UTC+1 (CET)
  - Summer (DST): UTC+2 (CEST)
- Postal code: 330 33
- Website: www.ujezdnademzi.cz

Újezd nade Mží is a municipality and village in Plzeň-North District in the Plzeň Region of the Czech Republic. It has about 100 inhabitants.

Újezd nade Mží lies approximately 13 kilometres (8 mi) west of Plzeň and 94 km (58 mi) west of Prague.

== Demographics ==
Historical population
Year	Pop.	±%
1869	331	—
1880	385	+16.3%
1890	313	−18.7%
1900	315	+0.6%
1910	310	−1.6%
1921	338	+9.0%
1930	329	−2.7%
1950	151	−54.1%
1961	140	−7.3%
1970	136	−2.9%
1980	96	−29.4%
1991	56	−41.7%
2001	60	+7.1%
2011	86	+43.3%
2021	116	+34.9%
Source: Censuses
