= Čilá =

- Municipality
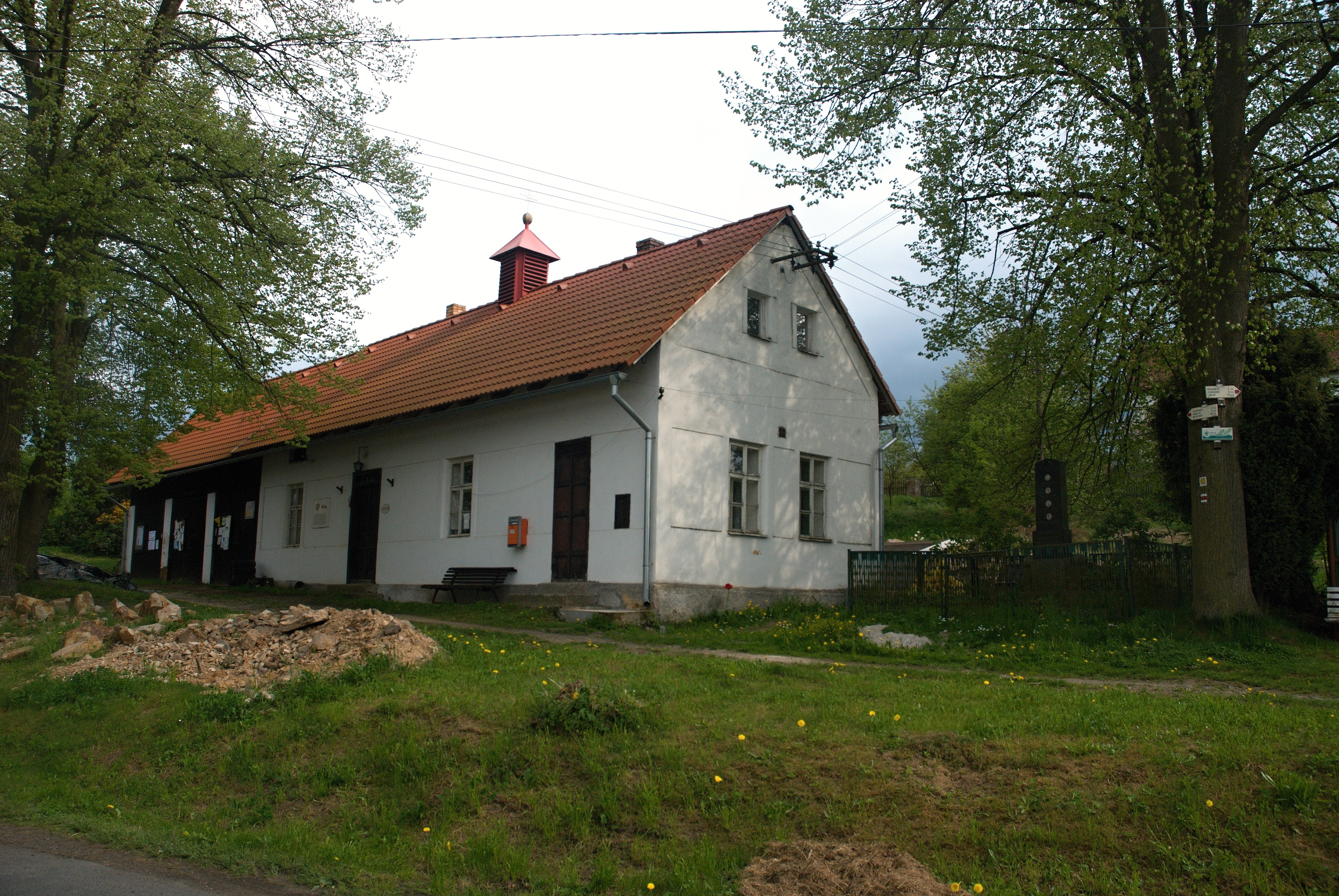
- Municipal office

- Location in the Czech Republic
- Coordinates: 49°57′42″N 13°44′32″E
- Country: Czech Republic
- Region: Plzeň
- District: Rokycany
- First mentioned: 1379

Area
  - Total: 1.91 km^{2} (0.74 sq mi)
- Elevation: 332 m (1,089 ft)

Population (2026-01-01)
  - Total: 20
  - Density: 10/km^{2} (27/sq mi)
- Time zone: UTC+1 (CET)
  - Summer (DST): UTC+2 (CEST)
- Postal code: 338 08
- Website: www.obec-cila.cz

Čilá is a municipality and village in Rokycany District in the Plzeň Region of the Czech Republic. It has about 20 inhabitants.

Čilá lies approximately 26 kilometres (16 mi) north-east of Rokycany, 36 km (22 mi) north-east of Plzeň, and 51 km (32 mi) west of Prague.

== History ==
The first written mention of Čilá is from 1379. During the Thirty Years' War, the village was abandoned, and was restored only in 1715.

From 1848 to 1935, Čilá was part of Hradiště. From 1935 to 1960, it was an independent municipality. From 1961 to 1990, Čilá was a municipal part of Podmokly.

== Demographics ==
Historical population
Year	Pop.	±%
1869	133	—
1880	127	−4.5%
1890	138	+8.7%
1900	136	−1.4%
1910	139	+2.2%
1921	102	−26.6%
1930	108	+5.9%
1950	52	−51.9%
1961	47	−9.6%
1970	37	−21.3%
1980	35	−5.4%
1991	24	−31.4%
2001	24	+0.0%
2011	19	−20.8%
2021	23	+21.1%
Source: Censuses
