= BAHNA =

Public military presentation in Plzeň, Czech Republic

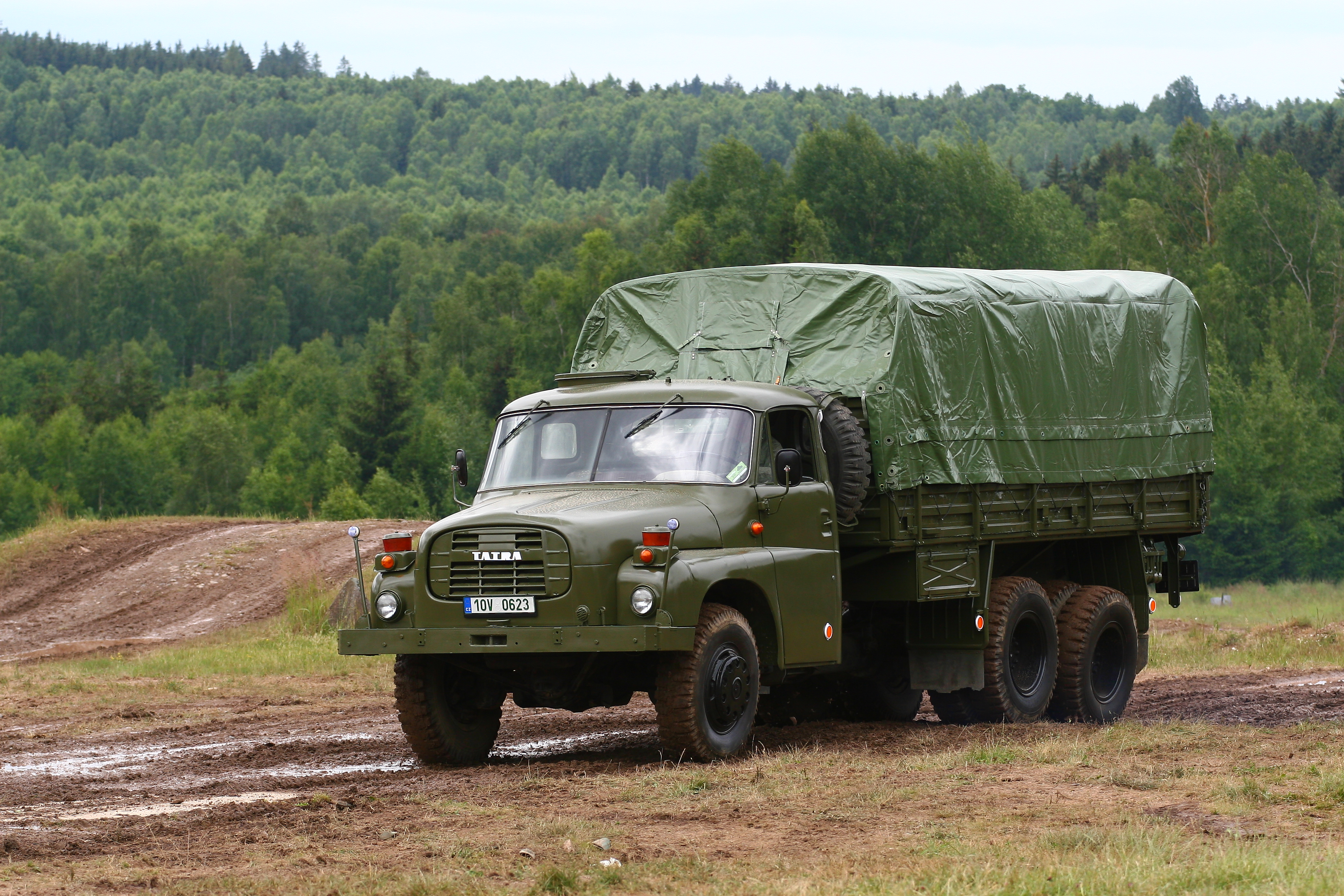
Tatra 148 vehicle presentation

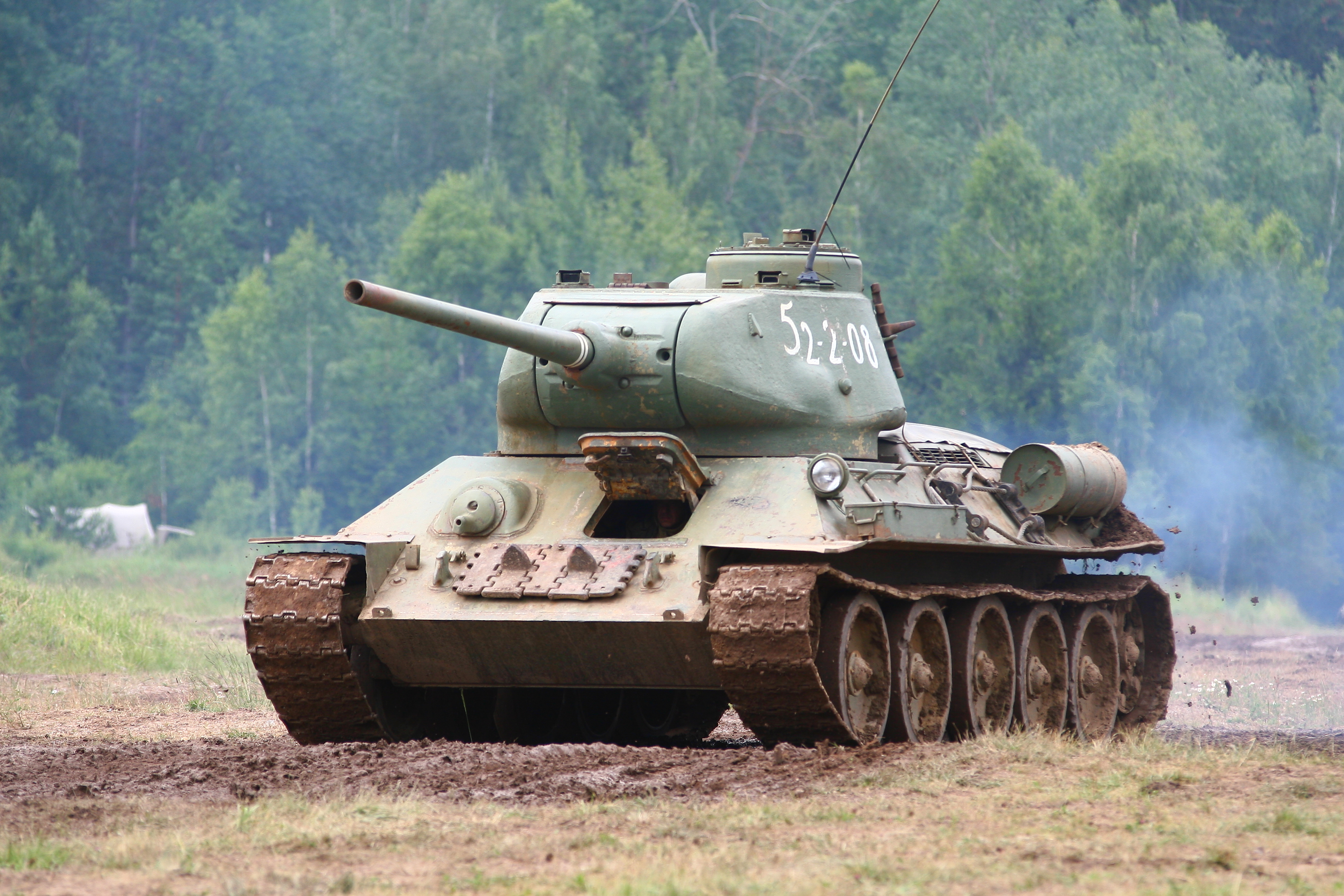
T-34-85 tank tank presentation

BAHNA is a regular no-fee public presentation of the Army of the Czech Republic in military training ground Zadní Bahna near Strašice in Plzeň Region, the Czech Republic. Its purpose is to promote the armed forces, to show military technology and to remember the military traditions and historical operations. The name is uppercased to distinguish the event from the location.

Starting in 1990 the event was organized by a military history club in Volduchy as a competition between historical vehicles in an extremely rough terrain (in Czech bahno, plural bahna means the silt). The popularity of the event gradually grew up among both the public and the professional soldiers. Since 1994 BAHNA is the official Land Forces Day (Den pozemního vojska) of the Czech army.

As of 2006 BAHNA has one day to present up-to-date military equipment, professional skills and readiness of Land Forces soldiers, including members of the Active Reserve. Military history clubs engage in historical reenactments related to Czech military history (usually from WWI or WWII era). BAHNA's typically have several hundred participants including some soldiers from the NATO countries. In recent years, about 50,000 visitors attended the event.
