= Hůrky =

- Municipality
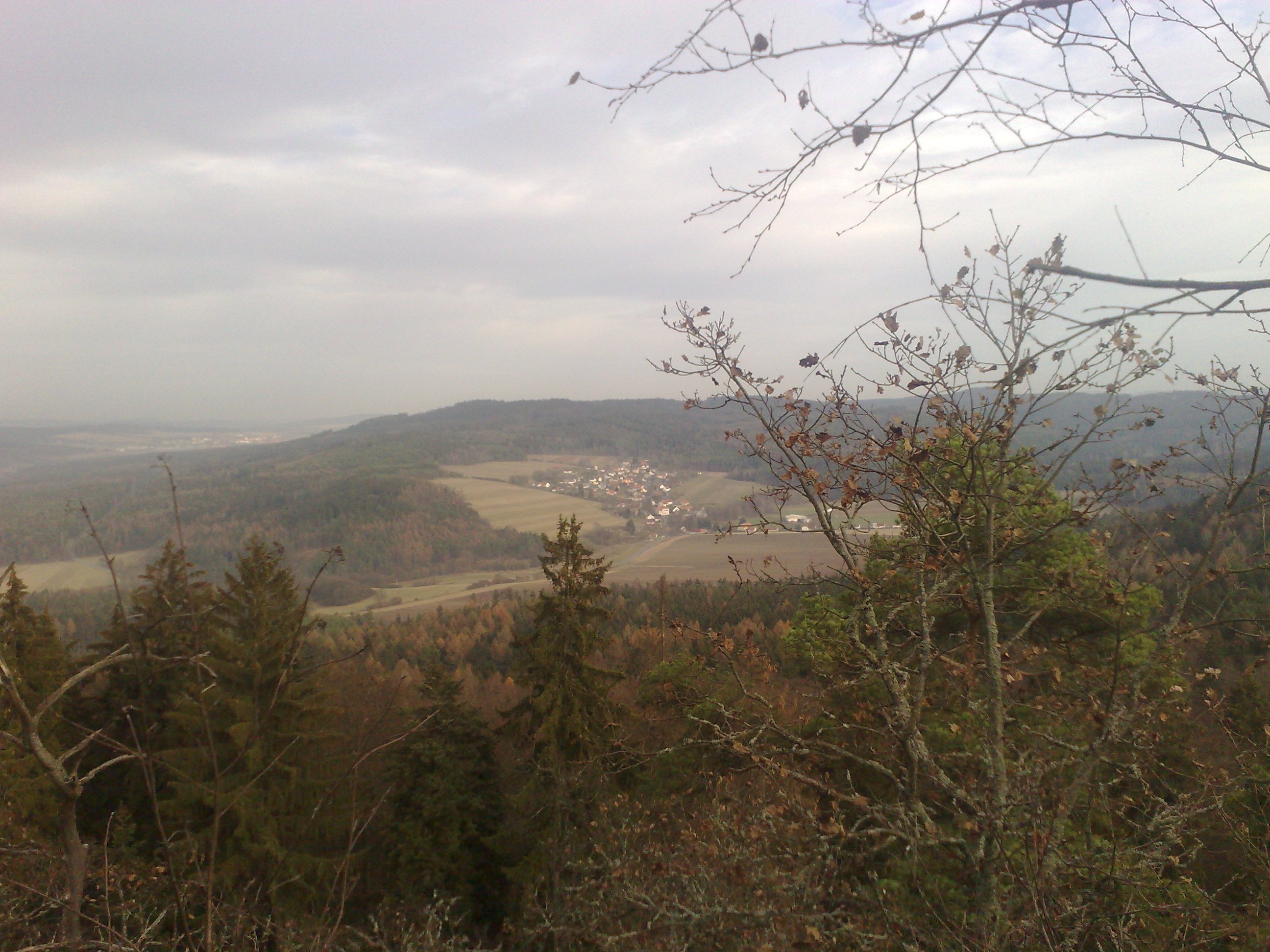
- View of Hůrky from the Žďár Hill

- Flag Coat of arms

- Location in the Czech Republic
- Coordinates: 49°44′45″N 13°40′59″E
- Country: Czech Republic
- Region: Plzeň
- District: Rokycany
- First mentioned: 1379

Area
  - Total: 12.07 km^{2} (4.66 sq mi)
- Elevation: 469 m (1,539 ft)

Population (2026-01-01)
  - Total: 230
  - Density: 19/km^{2} (49/sq mi)
- Time zone: UTC+1 (CET)
  - Summer (DST): UTC+2 (CEST)
- Postal code: 338 01
- Website: www.hurkyurokycan.cz

Hůrky (Czech pronunciation: [ˈɦuːrkɪ]) is a municipality and village in Rokycany District in the Plzeň Region of the Czech Republic. It has about 200 inhabitants.

Hůrky lies approximately 7 kilometres (4 mi) east of Rokycany, 23 km (14 mi) east of Plzeň, and 65 km (40 mi) south-west of Prague.

== History ==
From 1886 to 1889, Hůrky was part of Svojkovice. From 1890 to 1960, it was an independent municipality. From 1961 to 1967, Hůrky was a municipal part of Volduchy.

== Demographics ==
Historical population
| Year | Pop. | ±% |
|---|---|---|
| 1869 | 517 | — |
| 1880 | 523 | +1.2% |
| 1890 | 407 | −22.2% |
| 1900 | 427 | +4.9% |
| 1910 | 416 | −2.6% |
| 1921 | 393 | −5.5% |
| 1930 | 413 | +5.1% |
| 1950 | 344 | −16.7% |
| 1961 | 278 | −19.2% |
| 1970 | 242 | −12.9% |
| 1980 | 209 | −13.6% |
| 1991 | 181 | −13.4% |
| 2001 | 172 | −5.0% |
| 2011 | 249 | +44.8% |
| 2021 | 217 | −12.9% |
Source: Censuses
