= Svojkovice (Rokycany District) =

- Municipality
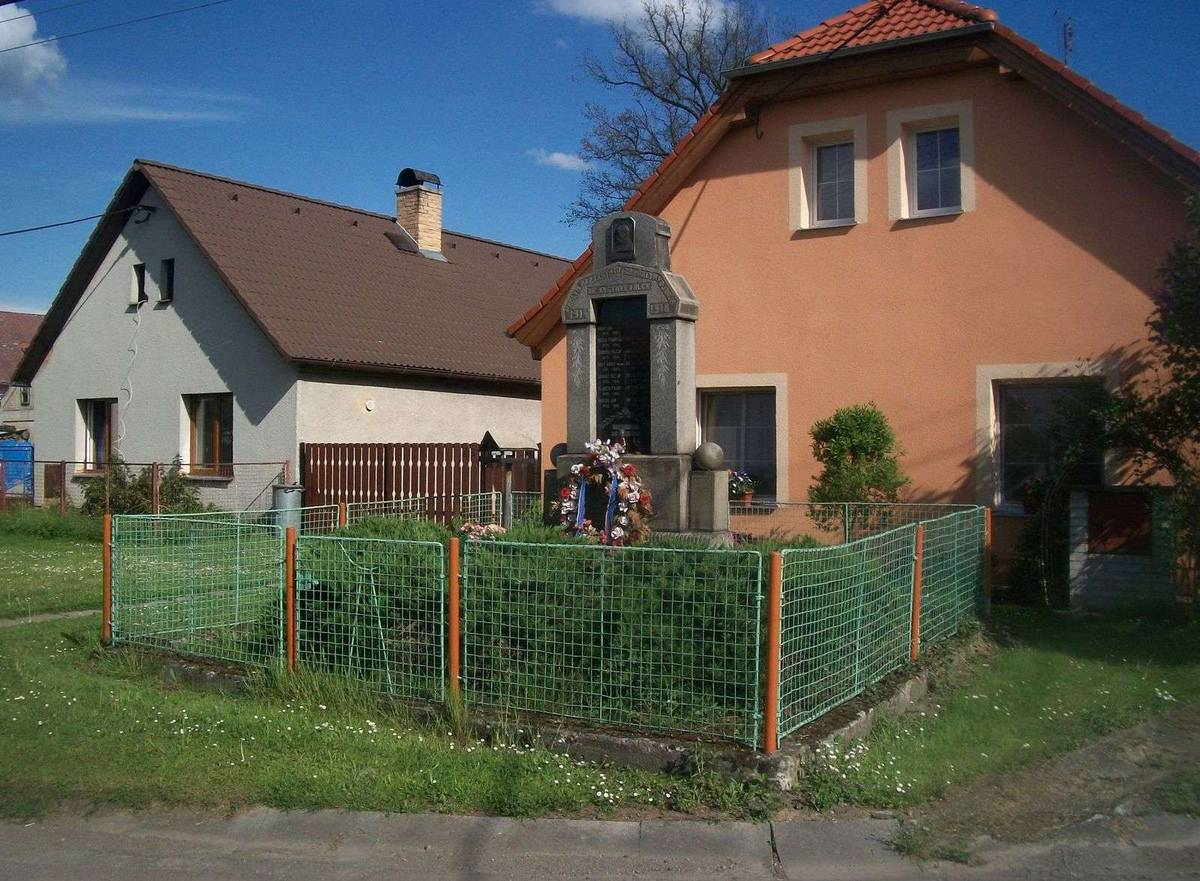
- Memorial to the Fallen

- Flag Coat of arms

- Location in the Czech Republic
- Coordinates: 49°45′36″N 13°38′54″E
- Country: Czech Republic
- Region: Plzeň
- District: Rokycany
- First mentioned: 1379

Area
  - Total: 5.79 km^{2} (2.24 sq mi)
- Elevation: 394 m (1,293 ft)

Population (2026-01-01)
  - Total: 500
  - Density: 86/km^{2} (220/sq mi)
- Time zone: UTC+1 (CET)
  - Summer (DST): UTC+2 (CEST)
- Postal code: 338 22
- Website: www.svojkovice.eu

Svojkovice (German: Swojkowitz) is a municipality and village in Rokycany District in the Plzeň Region of the Czech Republic. It has about 500 inhabitants.

== Etymology ==
The name is derived from the personal name Svojek, meaning "the village of Svojek's people".

== Geography ==
Svojkovice is located about 4 kilometres (2 mi) northeast of Rokycany and 18 km (11 mi) east of Plzeň. The western part of the municipality lies in the Švihov Highlands, the eastern parts extends into the Křivoklát Highlands. The highest point is the hill Vydřiduch at 513 m (1,683 ft) above sea level. The stream Holoubkovský potok flows through the municipality.

== History ==
The first written mention of Svojkovice is from 1379 under the name Svejkovice. It was then owned by the Rosenberg family as a part of the Strašice estate. The settlement was located a trade route leading from Prague to Rokycany. In 1422, it was sold to Zdeněk of Rožmitál and joined to the Zbiroh estate. Since then Svejkovice has shared the owners and destinies with this estate.

The Thirty Years' War left Svejkovice completely abandoned. It was not until 1712 that resettlement of the village was documented. In 1860, the railway near the village was built, but the local railway station was not built until 1923. In 1886, a school was opened and Svejkovice became an independent municipality. In 1901, the village was severely damaged by fire. In 1924, the name of the village was officially changed to Svojkovice.

In May 1945, Svojkovice was liberated by the Soviet Army. In 1959 a public swimming pool opened. In 1960, Svojkovice with Hůrky were incorporated into the municipality of Volduchy. On 1 July 1970, however, Svojkovice separated. From 1 January 1980 to 23 November 1990, Svojkovice was a municipal part of Rokycany. Since 24 November 1990, it has been a separate municipality.

== Demographics ==
Historical population

Year	Pop.	±%
1869	413	—
1880	425	+2.9%
1890	400	−5.9%
1900	384	−4.0%
1910	423	+10.2%

Year	Pop.	±%
1921	391	−7.6%
1930	365	−6.6%
1950	324	−11.2%
1961	336	+3.7%
1970	299	−11.0%

Year	Pop.	±%
1980	344	+15.1%
1991	342	−0.6%
2001	366	+7.0%
2011	405	+10.7%
2021	453	+11.9%

Source: Censuses

== Transport ==
The municipality is located next to the D5 motorway leading from Prague to Plzeň. The old Prague–Plzeň road runs through the village.

Svojkovice is located on the railway line heading from Přeštice and Plzeň to Beroun.

== Sights ==
The only protected cultural monument in the municipality is the rural house No. 8.
