= Franz Götz (composer) =

Franz Götz (baptised 29 July 1755, Strašice – buried 17 December 1815, Rokycany) was a Czech composer and concert violinist. His compositional output included sonatas, nocturnes, minuets, duets, trios, concertos, and six masses. He performed at the coronation of Emperor Leopold II in Prague in 1790, and reportedly drew the admiration of both Wolfgang Amadeus Mozart and Antonio Salieri for his work as a composer and violin virtuoso. He was for many years a musician in service to Cardinal Antonín Theodor Colloredo-Waldsee.
