= Hradiště (Rokycany District) =

- Municipality
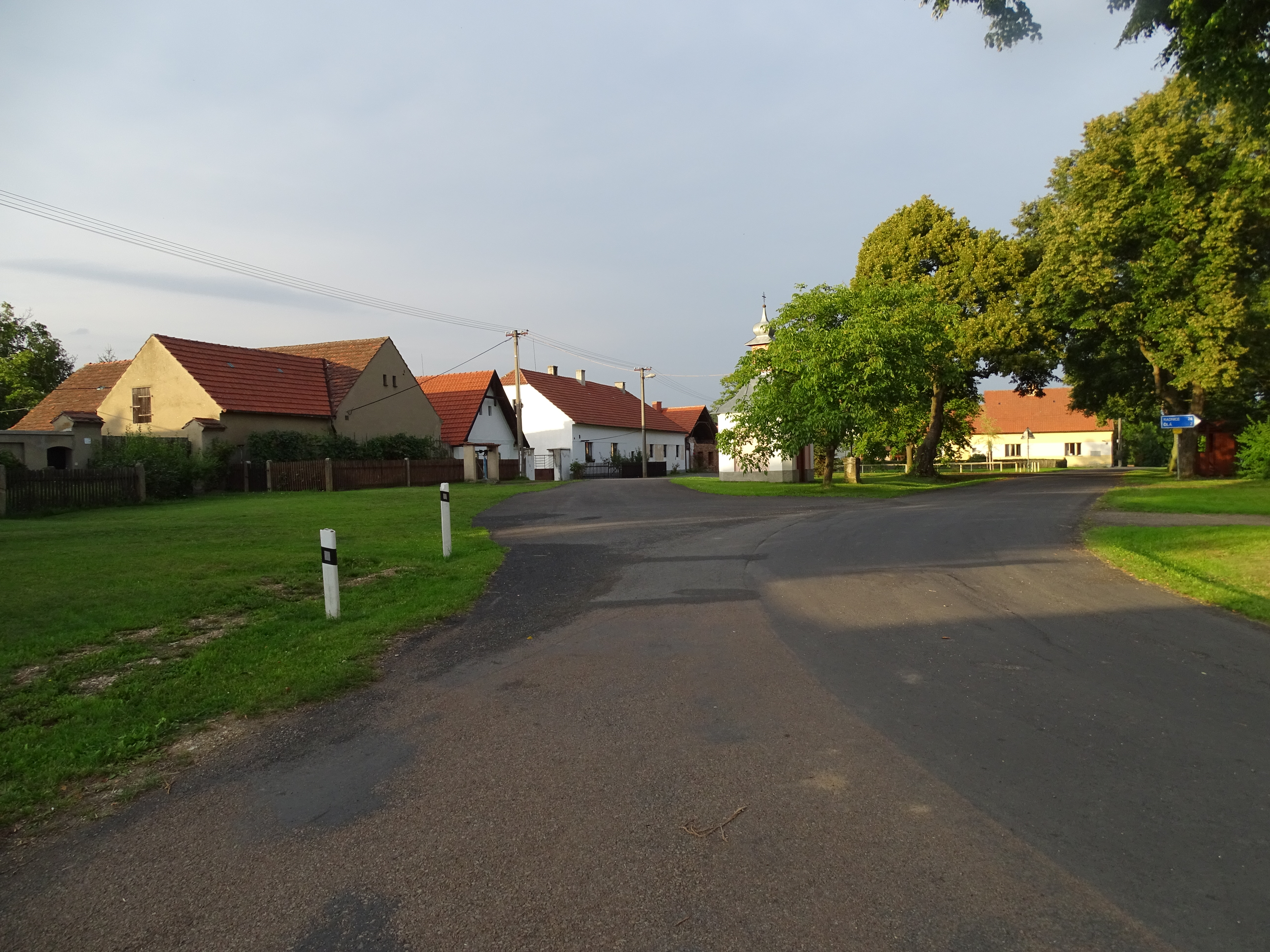
- Centre of Hradiště

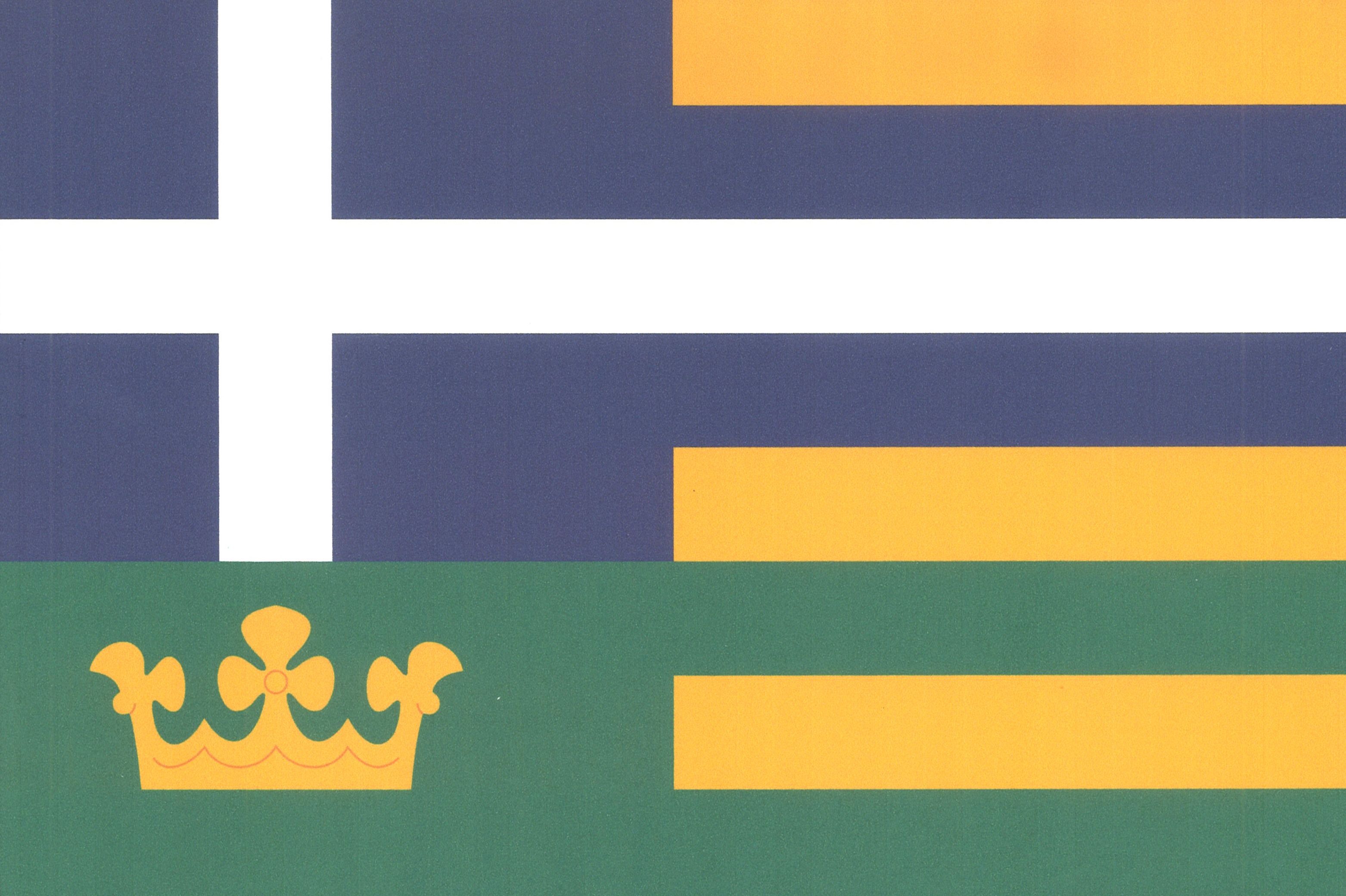
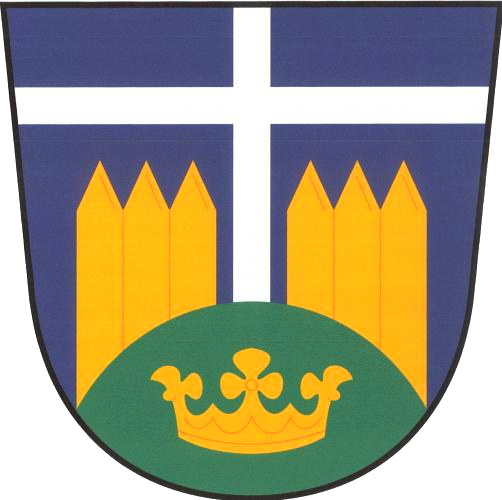
- Flag Coat of arms

- Location in the Czech Republic
- Coordinates: 49°57′47″N 13°43′4″E
- Country: Czech Republic
- Region: Plzeň
- District: Rokycany
- First mentioned: 1318

Area
  - Total: 2.84 km^{2} (1.10 sq mi)
- Elevation: 317 m (1,040 ft)

Population (2026-01-01)
  - Total: 46
  - Density: 16/km^{2} (42/sq mi)
- Time zone: UTC+1 (CET)
  - Summer (DST): UTC+2 (CEST)
- Postal code: 338 08
- Website: www.hradistenadberounkou.cz

Hradiště is a municipality and village in Rokycany District in the Plzeň Region of the Czech Republic. It has about 50 inhabitants.

Hradiště lies approximately 26 kilometres (16 mi) north-east of Rokycany, 34 km (21 mi) north-east of Plzeň, and 53 km (33 mi) west of Prague.

== History ==
From 1961 to 1990, Hradiště was a municipal part of Podmokly.

== Demographics ==
Historical population
Year	Pop.	±%
1869	179	—
1880	156	−12.8%
1890	148	−5.1%
1900	162	+9.5%
1910	189	+16.7%
1921	167	−11.6%
1930	143	−14.4%
1950	103	−28.0%
1961	82	−20.4%
1970	67	−18.3%
1980	39	−41.8%
1991	41	+5.1%
2001	29	−29.3%
2011	28	−3.4%
2021	31	+10.7%
Source: Censuses
