= 2019 World Team Ninepin Bowling Classic Championships – Men's tournament =

Tournament details
- Host country: Czech Republic
- City: Rokycany
- Venue: 1 (in 1 host city)
- Dates: 16–26 May
- Teams: 17

Final positions
- Champions: Serbia (5th title)
- Runners-up: Germany
- Third place: Hungary
- Fourth place: Croatia

Tournament statistics
- Matches played: 36
- Top scorer: (Czech Republic) Milan Svoboda 720

The men's tournament at the 2019 World Team Ninepin Bowling Classic Championships were held in Rokycany, Czech Republic, from 16 to 26 May 2019.

Serbia captured their fifth title by defeating Germany 6–2 in the final match. Bronze was secured by Hungary who beat Croatia 6–2.

== Participating teams ==
- Austria
- Bosnia and Herzegovina
- Croatia
- Czech Republic
- Denmark
- Estonia
- France
- Germany
- Hungary
- Italy
- North Macedonia
- Poland
- Romania
- Serbia
- Slovakia
- Slovenia
- Sweden

=== Draw ===
Pot 1	Pot 2	Pot 3	Pot 4
Germany; Hungary; Serbia; Slovakia	Austria; Croatia; Czech Republic (hosts); Slovenia	Bosnia and Herzegovina; France; Poland; Romania	Denmark; Estonia; Italy; North Macedonia; Sweden

=== Groups ===
Group A	Group B	Group C	Group D
Slovakia; Slovenia; France; Denmark	Serbia; Czech Republic (hosts); Poland; Estonia; North Macedonia	Hungary; Croatia; ~~Romania~~ (Note: The men's national team of Romania withdrew from participation in the championships.); Italy	Germany; Austria; Bosnia and Herzegovina; Sweden

== Group stage ==
=== Group A ===
		Pts	Matches			Team points		Set points		Qualification
Rank	Team	Pts	W	D	L	W	L	W	L	Qualification
1	Slovenia	6	3	0	0	21	3	51	21	Advance to quarterfinals
2	Slovakia	4	2	0	1	16	8	46.5	25.5	Advance to quarterfinals
3	France	2	1	0	2	10	14	36	36	
4	Denmark	0	0	0	3	1	23	10.5	61.5	

19 May 2019
15:00 CEST

Slovenia	8–0	France
3735 13.5	Report	7.5 3555
Matej Lepej 610 2.5		1.5 595 Corentin Rauscher
Primož Pintarić 646 2.0		2.0 625 Gianni Della Martire
Franci Velišček 628 2.0		2.0 597 Guillaume Changenet
Aleš Blaž 594 3.0		1.0 581 Ludovic Rousselet
Uroš Stoklas 610 3.0		1.0 591 Georges Ungurean
Janže Lužan 647 4.0		0.0 566 Benoit Pacaud ( (substituted on) 61 Anthony Rabier)

Zimní Stadion, Rokycany

19 May 2019
18:30 CEST

Slovakia	8–0	Denmark
3663 22.0	Report	2.0 3224
Milan Tomka 592 3.0		1.0 540 Theis Kyvsgaard Jensen
Bystrík Vadovič 607 4.0		0.0 531 Martin Folmer Hansen
Martin Kozák 606 4.0		0.0 537 Mikkel Schnell Jensen ( (substituted on) 61 Michael Winding)
Marcel Ivančík 599 3.0		1.0 543 Jonas Winding Soskov
( (substituted on) 61 Tomáš Pašiak) Erik Kuna 638 4.0		0.0 548 Claes Folmer Hansen
( (substituted on) 61 Marek Zajko) Peter Nemček 621 4.0		0.0 525 Daniel Host

Zimní Stadion, Rokycany

21 May 2019
08:00 CEST

France	2–6	Slovakia
3550 8.5	Report	15.5 3720
Georges Ungurean 560 1.0		3.0 597 Marek Zajko
Gianni Della Martire 592 0.0		4.0 657 Marcel Ivančík
Corentin Rauscher 568 1.0		3.0 628 Tomáš Pašiak
Guillaume Changenet 609 2.5		1.5 603 Peter Nemček
Ludovic Rousselet 579 1.0		3.0 636 Erik Kuna
Anthony Rabier 642 3.0		1.0 599 Martin Kozák ( (substituted on) 31 Bystrík Vadovič, (substituted on) 91 Milan Tomka)

Zimní Stadion, Rokycany

21 May 2019
11:30 CEST

Denmark	1–7	Slovenia
3335 4.5	Report	19.5 3797
Michael Winding 557 0.0		4.0 680 Primož Pintarić
Martin Folmer Hansen 556 0.0		4.0 645 Timi Jurančič
Theis Kyyvsgard Jensen 541 0.0		4.0 647 Uroš Stoklas
Jonas Winding Soskov 561 2.0		2.0 558 Gregor Bajzelj
( (substituted on) 31 Daniel Host) Mikkel Schnell Jensen 535 1.0		3.0 644 Janže Lužan
Claes Folmer Hansen 585 1.5		0.5 623 Aleš Blaž

Zimní Stadion, Rokycany

23 May 2019
15:00 CEST

France	8–0	Denmark
3593 20.0	Report	4.0 3263
Gianni Della Martire 596 3.0		1.0 554 Martin Folmer Hansen
Corentin Rauscher 615 4.0		0.0 532 Michael Winding
Guillaume Changenet 625 4.0		0.0 528 Daniel Host
Benoit Pacaud 594 3.0		1.0 569 Theis Kyvsgaard Jensen
Ludovic Rousselet 583 3.0		1.0 529 Claes Folmer Hansen
Anthony Rabier 580 3.0		1.0 551 Jonas Winding Soskov

Zimní Stadion, Rokycany

23 May 2019
18:30 CEST

Slovakia	2–6	Slovenia
3725 9.0	Report	15.0 3763
Marcel Ivančík 654 3.0		1.0 601 Timi Jurančič
Milan Tomka 607 1.0		3.0 630 Primož Pintarić
Bystrík Vadovič 611 2.0		2.0 588 Matej Lepej ( (substituted on) 38 Franci Velišček)
Tomáš Pašiak 638 2.0		2.0 650 Uroš Stoklas
Erik Kuna 603 0.0		4.0 685 Janže Lužan
Peter Nemček 612 1.0		3.0 609 Aleš Blaž

Zimní Stadion, Rokycany

=== Group B ===
		Pts	Matches			Team points		Set points		Qualification
Rank	Team	Pts	W	D	L	W	L	W	L	Qualification
1	Serbia	8	4	0	0	29	3	70	26	Advance to quarterfinals
2	Czech Republic (H)	6	3	0	1	19	13	52.5	43.5	Advance to quarterfinals
3	Poland	4	2	0	2	15	17	42	54	
4	North Macedonia	2	1	0	3	14	18	53	43	
5	Estonia	0	0	0	4	3	29	22.5	73.5	

16 May 2019
10:00 CEST

North Macedonia	2–6	Poland
3607 12.5	Report	11.5 3623
Bojan Vlakevski 606 1.5		2.5 616 Michał Szulc
Sašo Trpkovski 605 2.0		2.0 625 Michał Grędziak
Damir Fučkar 589 2.0		2.0 590 Tomasz Masłowski
( (substituted on) 61 Aleksandar Sokolovski) Ibrahim Memedi 564 3.0		1.0 560 Dawid Strzelczak
Boris Benedik 625 3.0		1.0 587 Jakub Osiewicz
Dimitar Dimitrovski 618 1.0		3.0 645 Bartosz Krug

Zimní Stadion, Rokycany

16 May 2019
13:30 CEST

Estonia	0–8	Czech Republic
3479 4.5	Report	19.5 3726
Markko Abel 581 1.0		3.0 636 Jan Bína
Marek Sööt 608 1.5		2.5 623 Michal Pytlík
Gert Piksar 604 0.5		2.5 641 Michael Kotal
Marko Muts 565 0.5		3.5 625 Jan Endršt
( (substituted on) 61 Kaido Kirs) Indrek Saar 537 1.0		3.0 601 Filip Dejda ( (substituted on) 61 Rostislav Gorecký)
Raul Rebane 584 0.0		4.0 600 Miroslav Jelínek ( (substituted on) 61 Milan Svoboda)

Zimní Stadion, Rokycany

17 May 2019
08:00 CEST

Estonia	0–8	North Macedonia
3499 3.0	Report	21.0 3772
Markko Abel 547 0.0		4.0 628 Sašo Trpkovski
Marek Sööt 578 1.0		3.0 597 Aleksandar Sokolovski
Gert Piksar 567 0.0		4.0 665 Bojan Vlakevski
Kaido Kirs 602 0.0		4.0 635 Dimitar Dimitrovski
Indrek Saar 591 1.0		3.0 621 Damir Fučkar ( (substituted on) 61 Mladen Donkovski)
Marko Muts 614 1.0		3.0 626 Boris Benedik

Zimní Stadion, Rokycany

17 May 2019
11:30 CEST

Poland	0–8	Serbia
3759 7.0	Report	17.0 3949
Jakub Osiewicz 635 1.0		3.0 672 Daniel Tepša
Arkadiusz Stachecki 684 1.5		2.5 690 Vilmoš Zavarko
Piotr Kieliba 590 0.0		4.0 658 Igor Kovačić
Michał Grędziak 630 1.5		2.5 663 Robert Ernješi
( (substituted on) 61 Dawid Strzelczak) Tomasz Masłowski 617 2.0		2.0 637 Čongor Baranj ( (substituted on) 91 Milan Jovetić)
Michał Szulc 603 1.0		3.0 629 Radovan Vlajkov ( (substituted on) 91 Aleksandar Milinković)

Zimní Stadion, Rokycany

19 May 2019
15:00 CEST

Serbia	6–2	Estonia
3789 18.5	Report	5.5 3442
Vilmoš Zavarko 689 4.0		0.0 563 Kaido Kirs
Aleksandar Milinković 622 3.0		1.0 551 Gert Piksar
Radovan Vlajkov 648 3.5		0.5 588 Markko Abel
Milan Jovetić 583 2.0		2.0 585 Indrek Saar
( (substituted on) 61 Uroš Jagličić) Daniel Tepša 632 4.0		0.0 532 Raul Rebane
( (substituted on) 61 Miloš Simijonović) Čongor Baranj 615 2.0		2.0 623 Marek Sööt

Zimní Stadion, Rokycany

19 May 2019
18:30 CEST

Czech Republic	5–3	North Macedonia
3753 11.5	Report	12.5 3740
Radek Hejhal 623 0.0		4.0 683 Bojan Vlakevski
Jan Bína 598 3.0		1.0 580 Aleksandar Sokolovski
Milan Svoboda 672 4.0		0.0 614 Dimitar Dimitrovski
Rostislav Gorecký 650 2.5		1.5 610 Sašo Trpkovski
Jiří Veselý 589 1.0		3.0 609 Boris Benedik
Michal Pytlík 621 1.0		3.0 644 Damir Fučkar

Zimní Stadion, Rokycany

21 May 2019
08:00 CEST

North Macedonia	1–7	Serbia
3723 7.0	Report	17.0 3961
Damir Fučkar 598 1.0		3.0 636 Radovan Vlajkov
Bojan Vlakevski 667 3.0		1.0 649 Daniel Tepša
Mladen Donkovski 588 0.0		4.0 649 Robert Ernješi
( (substituted on) 61 Ibrahim Memedi) Sašo Trpkovski 577 0.0		4.0 675 Igor Kovačić
Boris Benedik 639 1.0		3.0 677 Čongor Baranj
Dimitar Dimitrovski 649 2.0		2.0 675 Vilmoš Zavarko

Zimní Stadion, Rokycany

21 May 2019
11:30 CEST

Czech Republic	6–2	Poland
3755 16.5	Report	7.5 3605
Milan Svoboda 683 4.0		0.0 626 Jakub Osiewicz
Radek Hejhal 617 1.0		3.0 619 Arkadiusz Stachecki
Jan Endršt 617 2.0		2.0 623 Michał Szulc
Rostislav Gorecký 621 3.5		0.5 600 Michał Grędziak
Filip Dejda 586 3.0		1.0 544 Dawid Strzelczak ( (substituted on) 61 Tomasz Masłowski)
Jiří Veselý 631 3.0		0.0 593 Bartosz Krug

Zimní Stadion, Rokycany

23 May 2019
15:00 CEST

Poland	7–1	Estonia
3603 16.0	Report	8.0 3445
Jakub Osiewicz 618 2.0		2.0 575 Markko Abel
Michał Szulc 657 4.0		0.0 608 Marko Muts
( (substituted on) 61 Dawid Strzelczak) Piotr Kieliba 531 1.0		3.0 576 Kaido Kirs
Sebastian Piosik 585 3.0		1.0 558 Paul Rebane
Arakadiusz Stachecki 624 3.0		1.0 559 Marek Sööt
Bartosz Krug 588 3.0		1.0 569 Gert Piksar

Zimní Stadion, Rokycany

23 May 2019
18:30 CEST

Serbia	8–0	Czech Republic
3909 17.5	Report	6.5 3701
( (substituted on) 119 Miloš Simijonović) Radovan Vlajkov 631 3.0		1.0 598 Jan Endršt
Daniel Tepša 680 2.5		1.5 670 Filip Dejda
Igor Kovačić 644 3.0		1.0 610 Radek Helhal ( (substituted on) 61 Michal Pytlík)
Robert Ernješi 626 2.0		2.0 601 Michael Kotal
Vilmoš Zavarko 666 3.0		1.0 623 Jiří Veselý
( (substituted on) 61 Aleksandar Milinković) Čongor Baranj 662 4.0		0.0 599 Miroslav Jelínek

Zimní Stadion, Rokycany

=== Group C ===
		Pts	Matches			Team points		Set points		Qualification
Rank	Team	Pts	W	D	L	W	L	W	L	Qualification
1	Hungary	4	2	0	0	13	3	31.5	16.5	Advance to quarterfinals
2	Croatia	2	1	0	1	8	8	23	25	Advance to quarterfinals
3	Italy	0	0	0	2	3	13	17.5	30.5	

19 May 2019
11:30 CEST

Hungary	7–1	Italy
3908 17.0	Report	7.0 3724
Levente Kakuk 707 3.0		1.0 638 Wolfgang Blaas
Norbert Kiss 649 3.0		1.0 626 Christian Mair
Tamas Kiss 622 2.0		2.0 636 Michael Ladurner
Zsombor Zapletán 662 3.5		0.5 600 Armin Egger ( (substituted on) 61 Aaron Peer Prazter)
( (substituted on) 61 László Karsai) Gábor Kovács 606 2.5		1.5 614 Oswald Kofler
( (substituted on) 61 Zoltán Móricz) János Brancsek 662 3.0		1.0 610 Peter Gilg ( (substituted on) 61 Alex Posch)

Zimní Stadion, Rokycany

21 May 2019
18:30 CEST

Italy	2–6	Croatia
3639 10.5	Report	13.5 3767
( (substituted on) 61 Alex Posch) Christian Mair 568 0.0		4.0 649 Branko Manev
Wolfgang Blaas 634 1.0		3.0 637 Alen Kujundžić
Michael Ladurner 580 1.0		3.0 656 Luka Bolanča
Oswald Kofler 620 3.0		1.0 602 Luka Požega
Armin Egger 657 3.5		0.5 628 Dario Radoš
Peter Gilg 580 2.0		2.0 595 Damir Ceković

Zimní Stadion, Rokycany

23 May 2019
11:30 CEST

Hungary	6–2	Croatia
3856 14.5	Report	9.5 3812
Levente Kakuk 642 2.0		2.0 653 Branko Manev
Norbert Kiss 657 4.0		0.0 592 Mario Fridl
János Brancsek 666 2.0		2.0 648 Luka Bolanča
Zsombor Zapletán 635 3.0		1.0 628 Alen Kujundžić
Tamas Kiss 623 1.0		3.0 654 Nikola Muše
Gábor Kovács 633 2.5		1.5 637 Dario Radoš

Zimní Stadion, Rokycany

=== Group D ===
		Pts	Matches			Team points		Set points		Qualification
Rank	Team	Pts	W	D	L	W	L	W	L	Qualification
1	Germany	6	3	0	0	22	2	55.5	16.5	Advance to quarterfinals
2	Austria	4	2	0	1	16	8	48	24	Advance to quarterfinals
3	Bosnia and Herzegovina	2	1	0	2	10	14	33.5	38.5	
4	Sweden	0	0	0	3	0	24	7	65	

19 May 2019
08:00 CEST

Austria	7–1	Bosnia and Herzegovina
3798 19.0	Report	5.0 3623
Martin Rathmayer 613 1.0		3.0 619 Muamer Bešić
Philipp Vsetecka 649 3.0		1.0 606 Marko Trklja
Roman Gerdenitsch 629 3.0		1.0 607 Nemanja Galić ( (substituted on) 43 Miodrag Trklja)
Lukas Temistokle 635 3.0		1.0 613 Ivan Petrić
Matthias Zatschkowitsch 605 4.0		0.0 572 Dinko Dundić
Martin Janits 667 4.0		0.0 606 Darko Lotina

Zimní Stadion, Rokycany

19 May 2019
11:30 CEST

Germany	8–0	Sweden
3902 22.0	Report	2.0 3176
Manuel Weiß 648 4.0		0.0 497 Patrik Rasin
Mathias Weber 614 3.0		1.0 576 Hakan Strömberg
Christian Wilke 642 4.0		0.0 538 Niklas Persson
Dominik Kunze 693 4.0		0.0 514 Thomas Park Karlsson
Timo Hoffmann 622 3.0		1.0 531 Martin Wesell
( (substituted on) 61 Jürgen Pointinger) Thomas Schneider 683 4.0		0.0 520 Peter Barkenskiöld

Zimní Stadion, Rokycany

21 May 2019
15:00 CEST

Bosnia and Herzegovina	1–7	Germany
3658 7.5	Report	16.5 3882
Muamer Bešić 591 1.0		3.0 635 Dominik Kunze
Marko Trklja 645 3.0		1.0 626 Manuel Weiß
( (substituted on) 61 Darko Lotina) Ivan Petrić 597 1.5		2.5 635 Jürgen Pointinger
Nemanja Galić 624 1.0		3.0 675 Christian Wilke
Nermin Hrustemović 627 1.0		3.0 671 Timo Hoffmann
( (substituted on) 61 Dinko Dundić) Miodrag Trklja 574 0.0		4.0 640 Thomas Schneider ( (substituted on) 91 Mathias Dirnberger)

Zimní Stadion, Rokycany

21 May 2019
18:30 CEST

Sweden	0–8	Austria
3098 2.0	Report	22.0 3712
Hakan Strömberg 591 2.0		2.0 629 Markus Vsetecka
Yngve Hansson 414 0.0		4.0 599 Jürgen Ertl
Niklas Persson 525 0.0		4.0 658 Matthias Zatschkowitsch
Thomas Park Karlsson 505 0.0		4.0 585 Roman Gerdenitsch
Martin Wasell 501 0.0		4.0 646 Lukas Temistokle
Peter Barkenskiöld 562 0.0		4.0 595 Martin Rathmayer

Zimní Stadion, Rokycany

23 May 2019
08:00 CEST

Bosnia and Herzegovina	8–0	Sweden
3733 21.0	Report	3.0 3198
Ivan Petrić 654 3.0		1.0 547 Hakan Strömberg
Darko Lotina 603 3.0		1.0 505 Patrik Rasin
Nermin Hrustemoović 630 4.0		0.0 523 Niklas Persson
Muamer Bešić 622 4.0		0.0 553 Thomas Park Karlsson
Nemanja Galić 606 3.0		1.0 538 Martin Wasell
Marko Trklja 618 4.0		0.0 532 Peter Barkienskiöld

Zimní Stadion, Rokycany

23 May 2019
11:30 CEST

Germany	7–1	Austria
3879 17.0	Report	7.0 3717
Christian Wilke 643 3.0		1.0 622 Markus Vsetecka
Manuel Weiß 621 3.0		1.0 600 Lukas Temistokle
( (substituted on) 61 Jürgen Pointinger) Mathias Weber 617 1.0		3.0 649 Matthias Zatschkowitsch
Dominik Kunze 659 3.0		1.0 621 Martin Janits
Thomas Schneider 685 4.0		0.0 614 Philipp Vsetecka
Timo Hoffmann 654 3.0		1.0 613 Martin Rathmayer

Zimní Stadion, Rokycany

== Final Round ==
=== Bracket ===
Quarterfinals
1A	Slovenia	3
2C	Croatia	5
1B	Serbia	5
2D	Austria	3
1C	Hungary	6
2A	Slovakia	2
1D	Germany	6
2B	Czech Republic	2

Semifinals
Croatia	1
Serbia	7
Hungary	2
Germany	6

Final
Serbia	6
Germany	2
Third place
Croatia	2
Hungary	6

=== Quarterfinals ===
24 May 2019
08:00 CEST

Slovenia	3–5	Croatia
3834 13.0	Report	11.0 3850
Franci Velišček 657 2.0		2.0 653 Branko Manev
Primož Pintarić 581 2.0		2.0 600 Luka Požega
Timi Jurančič 661 2.0		2.0 644 Alen Kujundžić
Uroš Stoklas 618 1.0		3.0 698 Dario Radoš
Janže Lužan 677 2.0		2.0 680 Luka Bolanča
Aleš Blaž 640 4.0		0.0 575 Nikola Muše ( (substituted on) 40 Mario Fridl)

Zimní Stadion, Rokycany

24 May 2019
11:30 CEST

Serbia	5–3	Austria
3839 15.5	Report	8.5 3775
Igor Kovačić 655 2.0		2.0 675 Philipp Vsetecka
Vilmoš Zavarko 698 4.0		0.0 613 Matthias Zatschkowitsch
Daniel Tepša 639 2.0		2.0 677 Martin Janits
( (substituted on) 61 Čongor Baranj) Aleksandar Milinković 602 1.0		3.0 618 Markus Vsetecka
( (substituted on) 116 Miloš Simijonović) Radovan Vlajkov 615 3.5		0.5 594 Lukas Temistokle ( (substituted on) 61 Martin Rathmayer)
Robert Ernješi 630 3.0		1.0 598 Jürgen Ertl ( (substituted on) 61 Roman Gerdenitsch)

Zimní Stadion, Rokycany

24 May 2019
15:00 CEST

Hungary	6–2	Slovakia
3833 16.5	Report	3654 7.5
László Karsai 606 1.0		3.0 632 Erik Kuna
Norbert Kiss 630 1.0		3.0 634 Marcel Ivančík
Tamas Kiss 644 4.0		0.0 592 Tomáš Pašiak
Zsombor Zapletán 664 4.0		0.0 560 Bystrík Vadovič ( (substituted on) 61 Martin Kozák)
János Brancsek 634 3.0		1.0 608 Peter Nemček
Levente Kakuk ( (substituted on) 61 Zoltan Móricz) 655 3.5		0.5 628 Marek Zajko

Zimní Stadion, Rokycany

24 May 2019
18:30 CEST

Germany	6–2	Czech Republic
3912 15.0	Report	9.0 3865
Manuel Weiß 624 3.0		1.0 607 Radek Hejhal
Christian Wilke 678 1.0		3.0 720 Milan Svoboda
Jürgen Pointinger 690 4.0		0.0 634 Rostislav Gorecký
Dominik Kunze 650 3.0		1.0 591 Jan Bína ( (substituted on) 61 Michael Kotal)
Timo Hoffmann 648 3.0		1.0 640 Michal Pytlík
Thomas Schneider 620 1.0		3.0 673 Jiří Veselý

Zimní Stadion, Rokycany

=== Semifinals ===
25 May 2019
10:00 CEST

Croatia	1–7	Serbia
3744 5.0	Report	19.0 3919
Branko Manev 634 2.0		2.0 592 Radovan Vlajkov
Luka Požega 621 0.0		4.0 662 Daniel Tepša
Alen Kujundžić 644 0.0		4.0 686 Igor Kovačić
Dario Radoš 602 0.0		4.0 637 Robert Ernješi
( (substituted on) 31 Borna Gašpert) Luka Bolanča 626 1.0		3.0 673 Čongor Baranj ( (substituted on) 91 Milan Jovetić)
Damir Ceković 617 2.0		2.0 669 Vilmoš Zavarko ( (substituted on) 91 Miloš Simijonović)

Zimní Stadion, Rokycany

25 May 2019
13:30 CEST

Hungary	2–6	Germany
3829 11.5	Report	12.5 3851
Norbert Kiss 664 2.0		2.0 665 Jürgen Pointinger
Levente Kakuk 637 1.5		2.5 674 Christian Wilke
János Brancsek 641 4.0		0.0 583 Manuel Weiß ( (substituted on) 63 Mathias Dirnberger)
Zsombor Zapletán 648 2.0		2.0 635 Dominik Kunze
Tamas Kiss 639 1.0		3.0 663 Timo Hoffmann
Gábor Kovács 600 1.0		3.0 631 Thomas Schneider ( (substituted on) 91 Mathias Weber)

Zimní Stadion, Rokycany

=== Third place game ===
26 May 2019
08:00 CEST

Croatia	2–6	Hungary
3754 11.0	Report	13.0 3900
Alen Kujundžić 669 1.0		1.0 651 Levente Kakuk
Branko Manev 638 2.0		2.0 655 László Karsai
Dario Radoš 576 1.0		3.0 651 János Brancsek
Damir Ceković 620 2.0		2.0 627 Zsombor Zapletán
Luka Bolanča 670 2.0		2.0 658 Tamas Kiss
( (substituted on) 61 Borna Gašpert) Luka Požega 581 1.0		3.0 658 Norbert Kiss ( (substituted on) 61 Zoltan Móricz)

Zimní Stadion, Rokycany

=== Final ===
26 May 2019
15:00 CEST

Serbia	6–2	Germany
3976 16.0	Report	8.0 3887
Igor Kovačić 632 3.0		1.0 617 Jürgen Pointinger
Daniel Tepša 681 2.0		2.0 666 Dominik Kunze
Robert Ernješi 650 2.0		2.0 666 Christian Wilke
Radovan Vlajkov 665 2.0		2.0 673 Thomas Schneider
Vilmoš Zavarko 655 3.0		1.0 649 Timo Hoffmann
Čongor Baranj 693 4.0		0.0 616 Manuel Weiß

Zimní Stadion, Rokycany

== Final standing ==
Rank	Team
1st place, gold medalist(s)	Serbia
2nd place, silver medalist(s)	Germany
3rd place, bronze medalist(s)	Hungary
4	Croatia
5–8	Austria
5–8	Czech Republic
5–8	Slovakia
5–8	Slovenia
9–12	Bosnia and Herzegovina
9–12	France
9–12	Italy
9–12	Poland
13–16	Denmark
13–16	Estonia
13–16	North Macedonia
13–16	Sweden
