= Borek (Rokycany) =

- Village
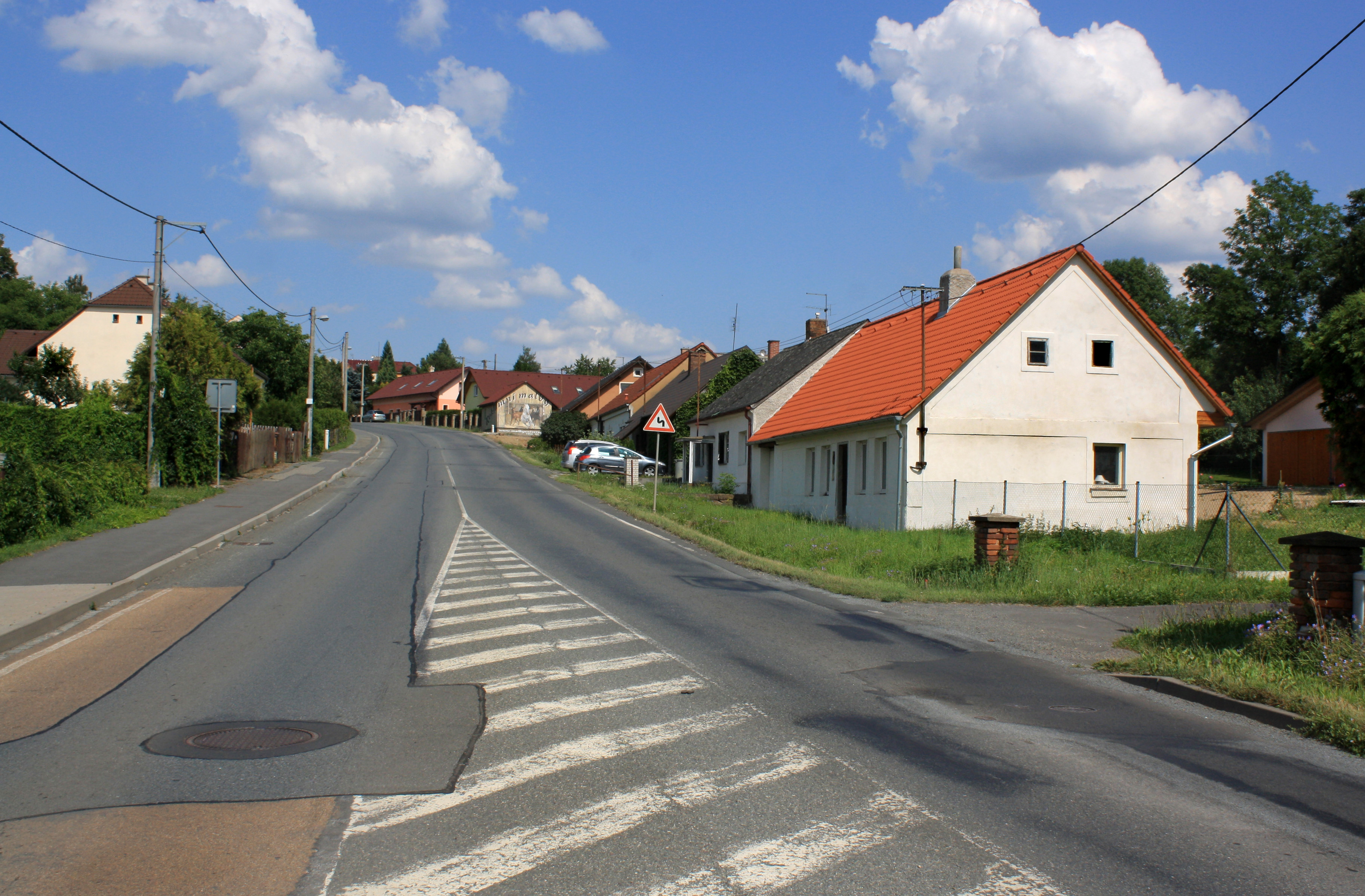

- Location within Czech Republic
- Coordinates: 49°44′54″N 13°37′29″E
- Country: Czech Republic
- Region: Plzeň
- District: Rokycany

Area
  - Total: 2.18 km^{2} (0.84 sq mi)

Population (2021)
  - Total: 447
  - Density: 205/km^{2} (531/sq mi)
- Postal code: 337 01

Borek is a village and administrative part of Rokycany in Rokycany District in the Plzeň Region of the Czech Republic.

== History ==
The formerly independent village of Borek is located ca.2 km east of Rokycany's town centre. Mentioned for the first time in 1390 („Borek villa ad distr. Rokyczan“). In the 15th century the village was abandoned to be resettled in the 17th century as a small cluster of dwellings centered on the iron mill. It grew further in the 18th and 19th centuries, covering most of the elevated peninsula of Borecký pond. During the 19th century the built-up area expanded southwards, to the proximity of the major Prague–Plzeň road. In 1960 Borek came under the jurisdiction of Rokycany. In the 20th century the built-up area of Borek further expanded amalgamating the village with Rokycany.

== Demography ==
Borek's population saw major growth for most of the 19th century. In the second half of the 20th century it however started to decline significantly. The depopulation slowed recently and as new areas are slated for residential development in Borek the trend is to revert soon.

Year	1869	1880	1890	1900	1910	1921	1930	1950	1961	1970	1980	1991	1995	2001	2007
Population	473	504	544	513	586	618	589	427	356	440	405	335	271	263	261

== Sights ==
The Borecký pond is the main landmark of Borek. Area of the pond is reported to be 10–15 hectares.
