= Litohlavy =

- Municipality
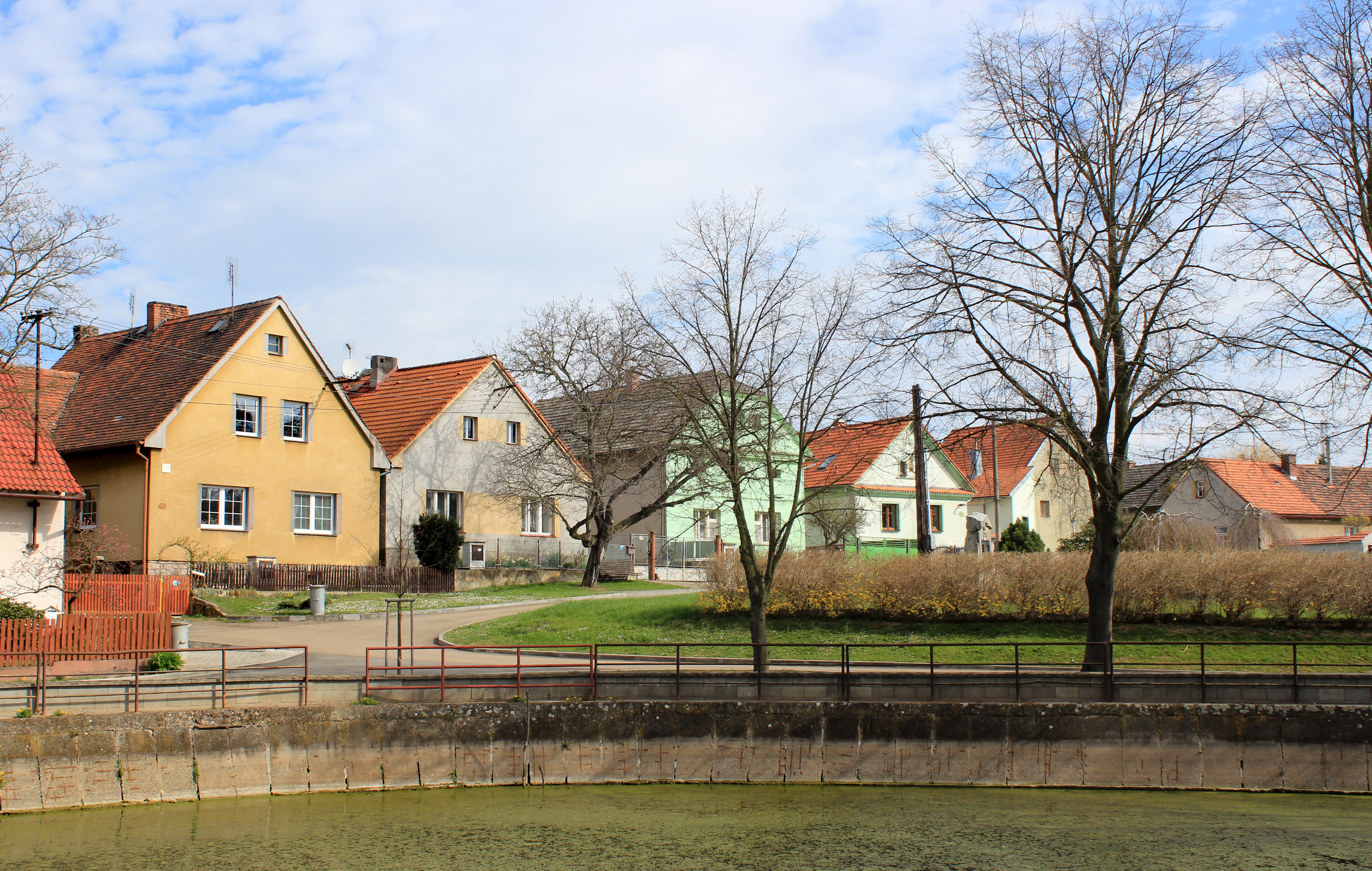
- Centre of Litohlavy

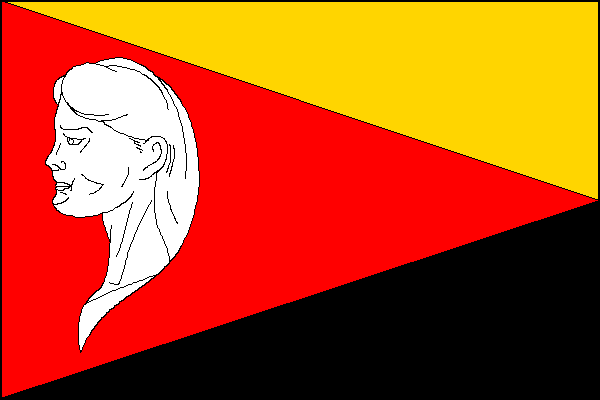
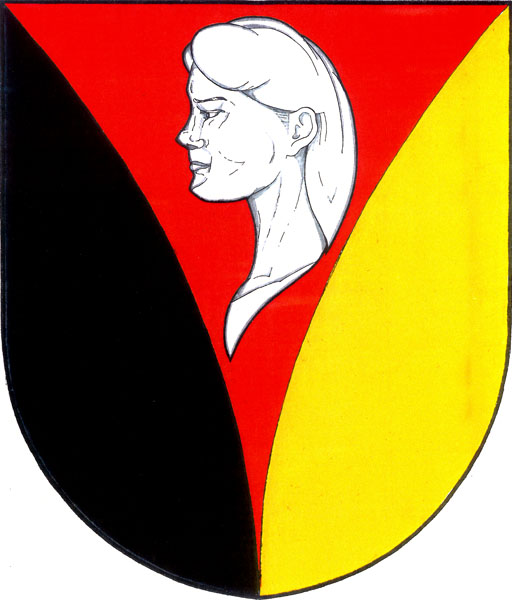
- Flag Coat of arms

- Location in the Czech Republic
- Coordinates: 49°46′0″N 13°33′53″E
- Country: Czech Republic
- Region: Plzeň
- District: Rokycany
- First mentioned: 1390

Area
  - Total: 7.78 km^{2} (3.00 sq mi)
- Elevation: 403 m (1,322 ft)

Population (2026-01-01)
  - Total: 563
  - Density: 72.4/km^{2} (187/sq mi)
- Time zone: UTC+1 (CET)
  - Summer (DST): UTC+2 (CEST)
- Postal code: 337 01
- Website: www.litohlavy.rokycansko.cz

Litohlavy (German: Litohlau) is a municipality and village in Rokycany District in the Plzeň Region of the Czech Republic. It has about 600 inhabitants.

== Etymology ==
The word litohlav (from lítá hlava, which literally means 'ferocious head' in Czech) was an Old Czech term for a wild or cruel person. The word Litohlavy denoted a village of such people.

== Geography ==
Litohlavy is located about 3 kilometres (2 mi) north of Rokycany and 12 km (7 mi) east of Plzeň. It lies in the Švihov Highlands. The highest point is the Hůrka hill at 485 m (1,591 ft) above sea level. The municipality is situated on both banks of the stream Voldušský potok, which bisects the territory into two parts.

== History ==
The first written mention of Litohlavy is from 1390. It belonged to the Rokycany domain from 1498 until 1850. In the 19th century, some iron ore mining developed in the territory of Litohlavy, however the village had mostly rural economy. In 1980–1993, Litohlavy was a municipal part of Rokycany.

== Demographics ==
Historical population

Year	Pop.	±%
1869	600	—
1880	625	+4.2%
1890	603	−3.5%
1900	635	+5.3%
1910	726	+14.3%

Year	Pop.	±%
1921	668	−8.0%
1930	672	+0.6%
1950	608	−9.5%
1961	602	−1.0%
1970	577	−4.2%

Year	Pop.	±%
1980	492	−14.7%
1991	457	−7.1%
2001	457	+0.0%
2011	494	+8.1%
2021	538	+8.9%

Source: Censuses

== Transport ==
The D5 motorway from Prague to Plzeň runs south of Litohlavy along the municipal border.

== Sights ==
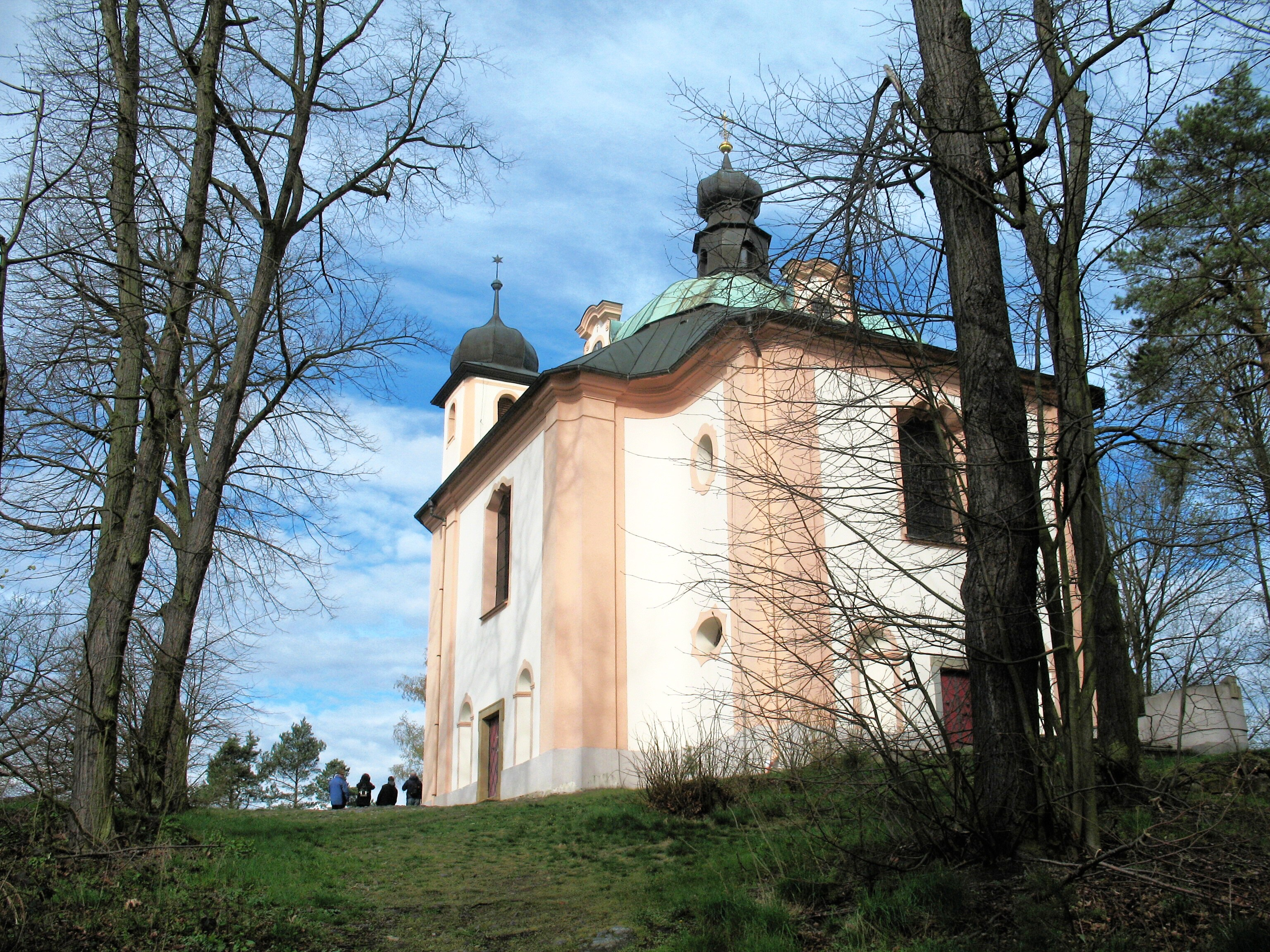
Chapel of the Visitation of the Virgin Mary

The main landmark of Litohlavy is the Chapel of the Visitation of the Virgin Mary, located on the hill Vršíček. It is a pilgrimage site, built in the Baroque style in 1744–1747.
