= Vhrsti =

Czech illustrator, comics painter and screenwriter, cartoonist and artist (born 1975)

- Born: Vojtěch Jurík; 1 August 1975 (age 51); Rokycany, Czechoslovakia
- Education: University of West Bohemia
- Occupations: illustrator, writer
- Writing career
- Period: 2000s (decade)–present
- Notable work: I'm Not Afraid of the Dark Any More
- Website: vhrsti.cz

Vhrsti (born 1 August 1975) is a Czech illustrator, writer, children's book author, comics artist and scenarist, member of the unofficial new wave of Czech and Slovak comics Generation Zero and the Czech Cartoonists' Union. He lives in Plzeň in the Czech Republic.

== Early life and education ==
Vhrsti was born on 1 August 1975 in Rokycany, in the former Czechoslovakia. He graduated from technical high school in Karlovy Vary, in ceramic (porcelain visual processing) and the Faculty of Education at the University of West Bohemia in Plzeň (field of visual culture).

== Career ==
=== Children's books ===
He is devoted to writing children's books (I'm not Afraid of the Dark, Holidays in Heaven) and providing illustrations for other author's works. He has become the only illustrator of Vojtěch Steklač replacing Adolf Born on the series of books about Borik et al. Vhrsti illustrates fairytale books and legends by Markéta Čekanová and Zdeněk Zajíček as well as fairy CD covers. His images adorn the Museum of Ghosts and Fairy Tales in Plzeň.

=== Comics ===
First, he drew attention to himself by making a debut in three-page comics Peace in Slovenian anti-war anthology Warburger in 2003. In the same year won the Jury Prize at the International Saloon of young comics in Belgrade for comics Blur. Subsequently, his comics strips became published in many periodicals, including AARGH!, KomiskFEST! Revue or Sluníčko (Czech Republic) and magazines published in Ukraine and Italy. In 2006 also collaborated with the newspaper Deník in which he published his series of Endless Tram Strip. In the same year he won The Best Comics Website prize in the Czech Republic. The Fisherman comics was published in a special issue dedicated to the International Olympic Winter Games TORINO 2006. Since 2008, one-page autobiographical stories have been published in a literary magazine Plz.

=== Cartoons ===
Vhrsti's simple clean lines and his penchant for pastel colors make him ideally suited to work on children's cartoon series, meditative stories for adults and classic cartoons – since 2005 is a member of the Czech Union of Cartoonists. The cartoon on the topic of dangerous drawing won the 2006 Certificate of Excellence from the National Press Club of Canada, Ottawa, Ontario. In 2010 he was one of the guests at Cartoon International Meeting Point in Písek, Czech Republic.
