= Strašice =

- Municipality
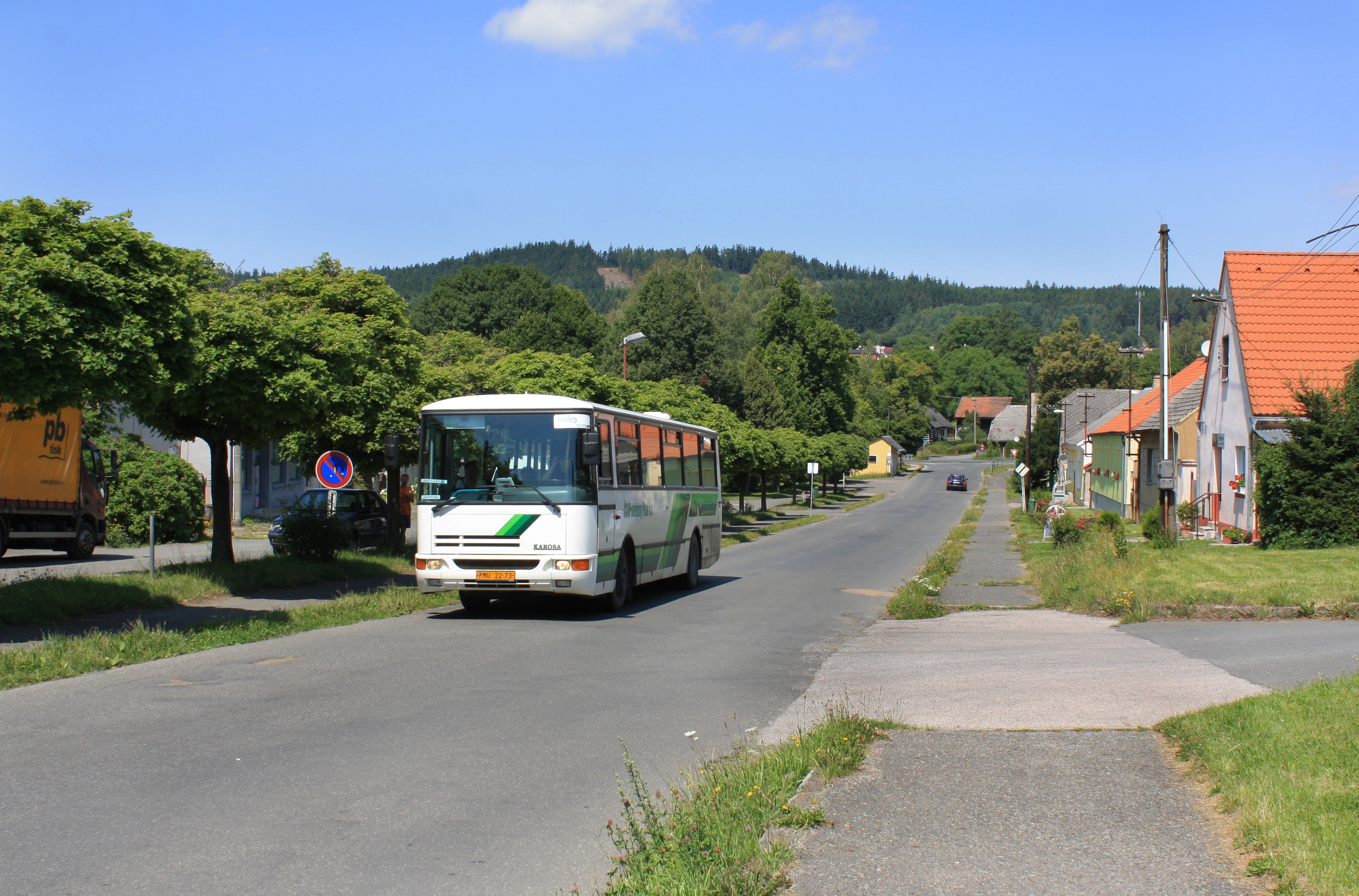
- Centre of Strašice

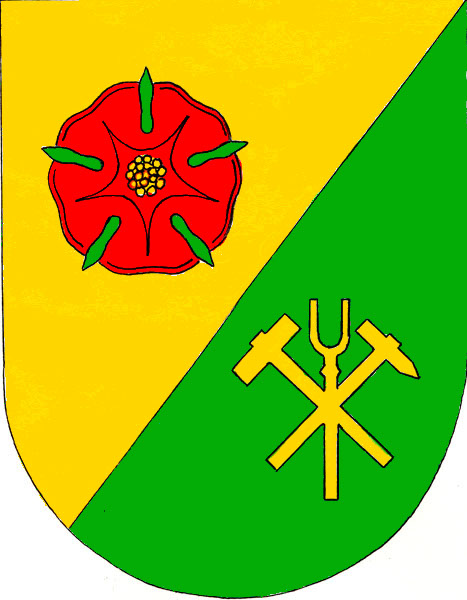
- Flag Coat of arms

- Location in the Czech Republic
- Coordinates: 49°44′26″N 13°45′35″E
- Country: Czech Republic
- Region: Plzeň
- District: Rokycany
- First mentioned: 1349

Area
  - Total: 34.83 km^{2} (13.45 sq mi)
- Elevation: 498 m (1,634 ft)

Population (2026-01-01)
  - Total: 2,805
  - Density: 80.53/km^{2} (208.6/sq mi)
- Time zone: UTC+1 (CET)
  - Summer (DST): UTC+2 (CEST)
- Postal code: 338 45
- Website: www.strasice.eu

Strašice is a municipality and village in Rokycany District in the Plzeň Region of the Czech Republic. It has about 2,800 inhabitants.

== Etymology ==
The name is derived from the personal name Strach, meaning "the village of Strach's people".

== Geography ==
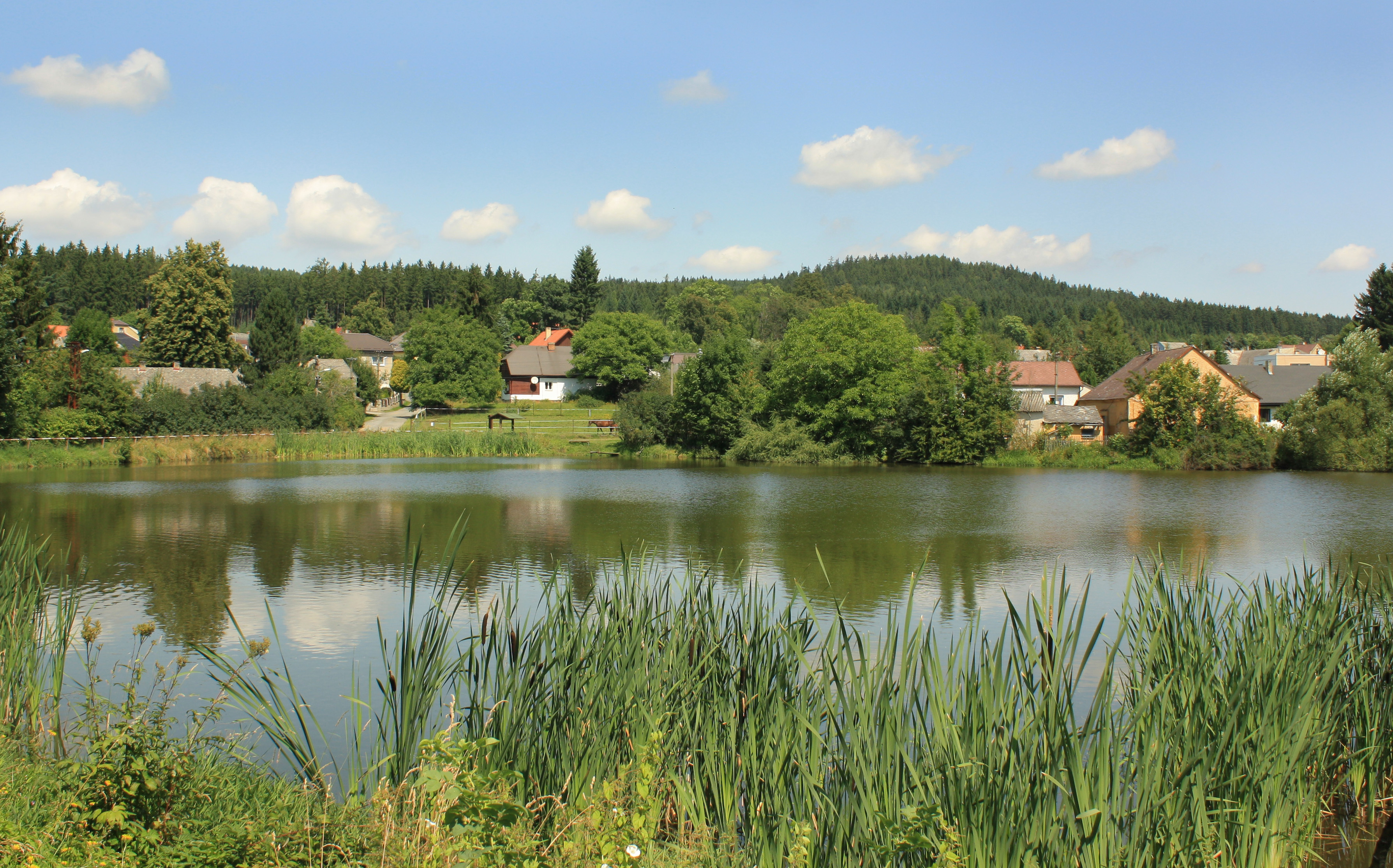
Dvorský pond

Strašice is located about 11 kilometres (7 mi) east of Rokycany and 26 km (16 mi) east of Plzeň. It lies in the Brdy Highlands. The highest point is the hill Kočka at 789 m (2,589 ft) above sea level. The Klabava River flows through the southern part of the municipal territory. Most of the territory is forested and belongs to the Brdy Protected Landscape Area.

There are several small fishponds around the village. The southern tip of the municipal territory is formed by two notable ponds called Hořejší Padrťský rybník (with an area of 78.8 ha (195 acres)) and Dolejší Padrťský rybník (with an area of about 40 ha (99 acres)). They were founded in the 16th century and they are the largest bodies of water in the region. Species of birds that are endangered within the country nest here, e.g. white-tailed eagle, black stork, common snipe and gray heron. There is a peat bog along the eastern shore of Hořejší Padrťský rybník.

== History ==
The first written mention of Strašice is from 1349, when the village was owned by the Rosenberg family. In the 16th century, it was acquired by the Lobkowicz family. In 1594, properties of this family were confiscated by the royal chamber. In these times, iron industry began to develop. In 1603, one of the first blast furnaces in the Czech lands was built here. Strašice was promoted to a market town, but after the Thirty Years' War, it became again just a village. The population devastated by the war was partly supplemented by migrants from Germany.

From the 17th to the 20th century, metallurgy was joined by the production of nails as the main livelihood of the local inhabitants. In the 18th century, there were three blast furnaces and five hammer mills in Strašice. In 1873, Strašice was again promoted to a market town, but it lost this title after World War II.

== Demographics ==
Historical population

Year	Pop.	±%
1869	3,921	—
1880	3,655	−6.8%
1890	3,575	−2.2%
1900	3,175	−11.2%
1910	3,048	−4.0%

Year	Pop.	±%
1921	2,734	−10.3%
1930	2,593	−5.2%
1950	2,620	+1.0%
1961	2,189	−16.5%
1970	2,362	+7.9%

Year	Pop.	±%
1980	2,309	−2.2%
1991	2,208	−4.4%
2001	2,466	+11.7%
2011	2,505	+1.6%
2021	2,440	−2.6%

Source: Censuses

== Transport ==
There are no railways or major roads passing through the municipality.

== Sights ==
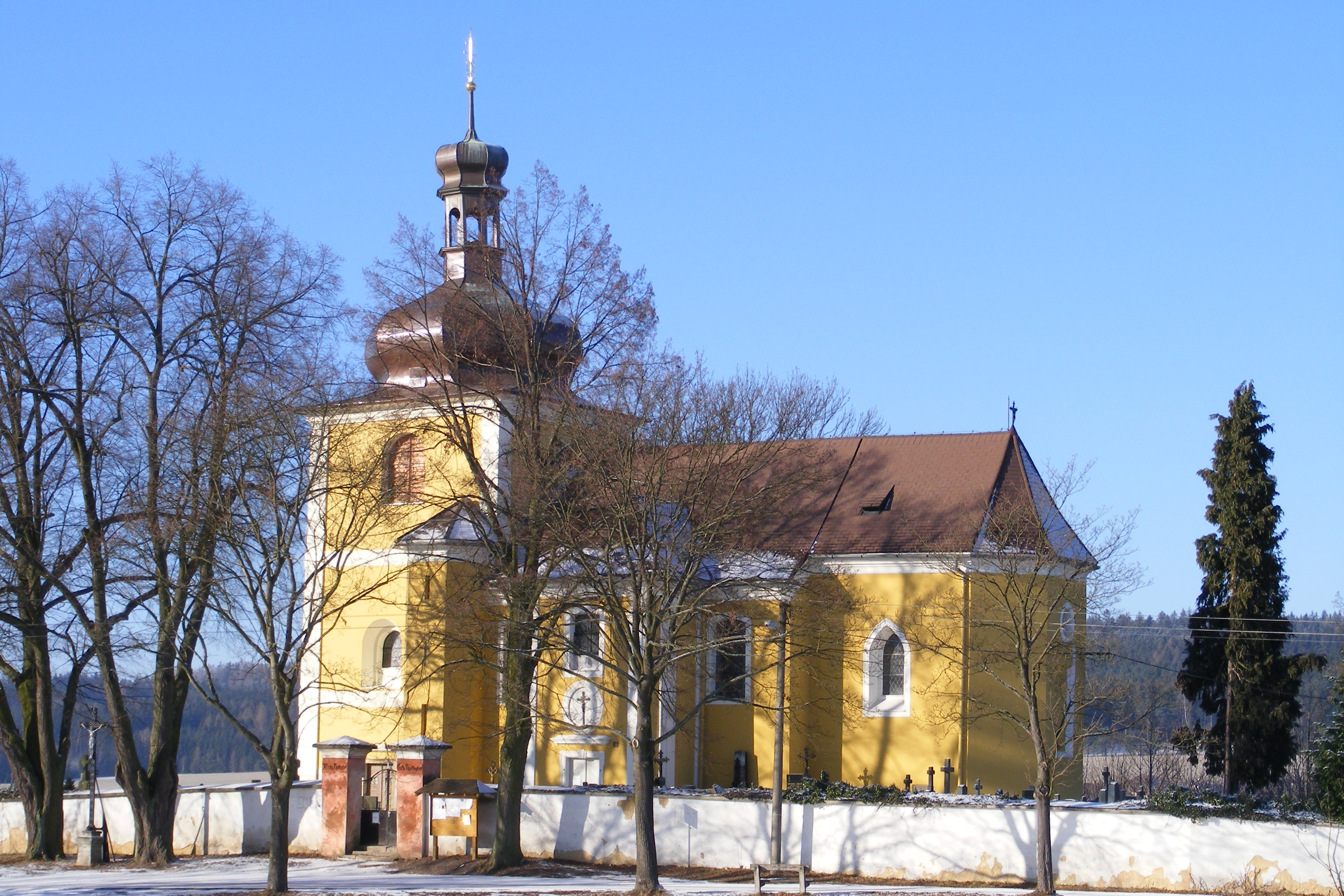
Church of Saint Lawrence

The main landmark of Strašice is the Church of Saint Lawrence. It dates from the mid-14th century. In the second half of the 18th century, the church was rebuilt in the Baroque style to its present form.

A notable building is the Tři Trubky hunting lodge. It was built in the historicist style in 1888–1890 according to the design by Camillo Sitte. It is among the last preserved buildings in the former Brdy military area. Today it serves as a recreational facility. In the former farm facilities next to the hunting lodge, the visitor's centre of the Brdy Protected Landscape Area was opened in 2023.

== Notable people ==
- Franz Götz (1755–1815), composer and violinist
- Jiří Feureisl (1931–2021), footballer

== Twin towns – sister cities ==
Strašice is twinned with:

- Hohenfels, Germany
