= Podmokly (Rokycany District) =

- Municipality
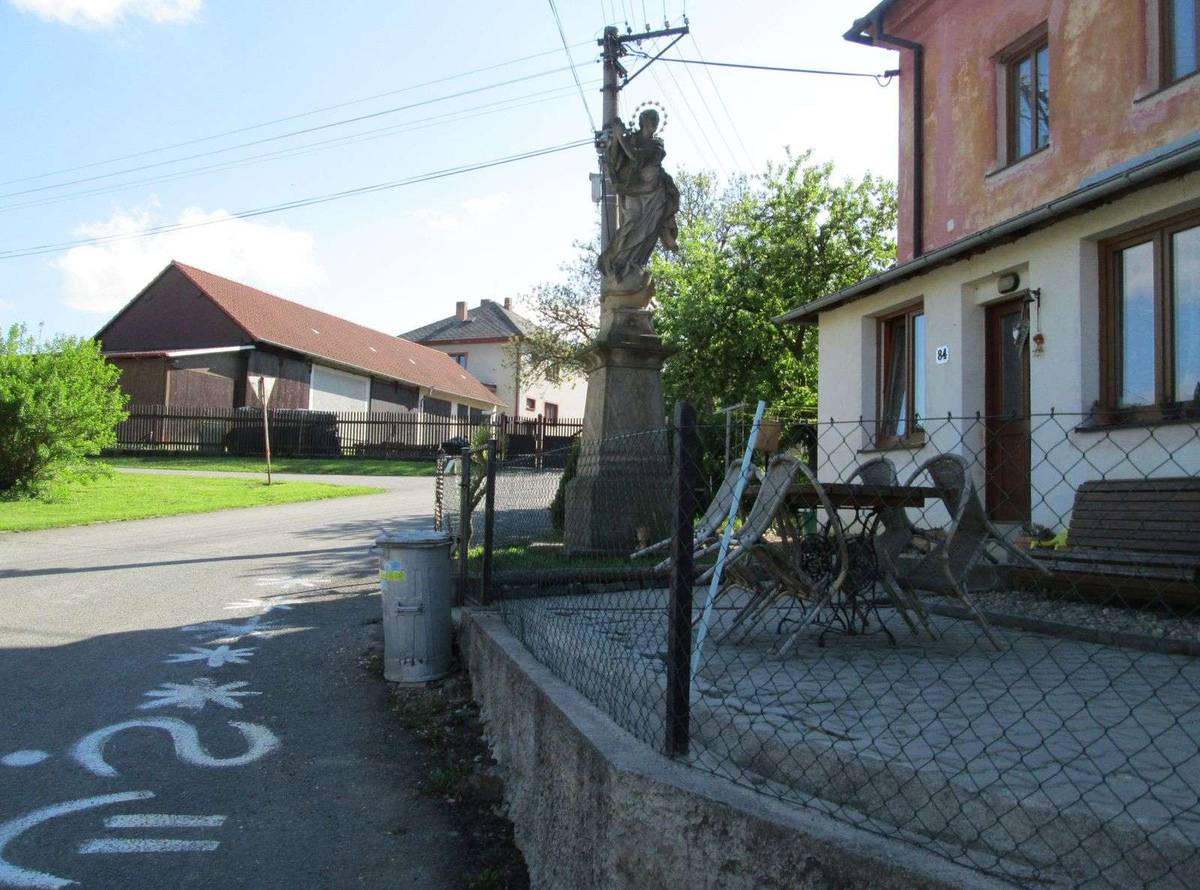
- Statue of the Virgin Mary Immaculate

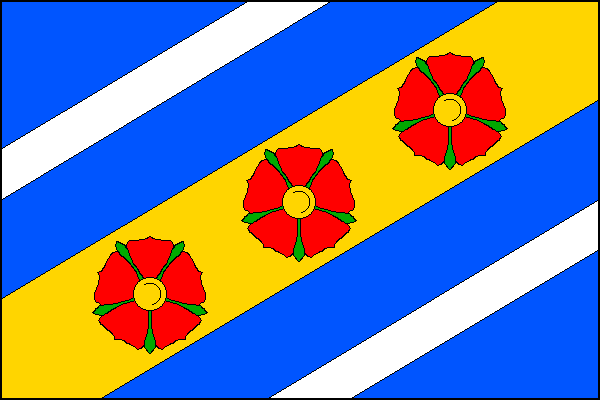
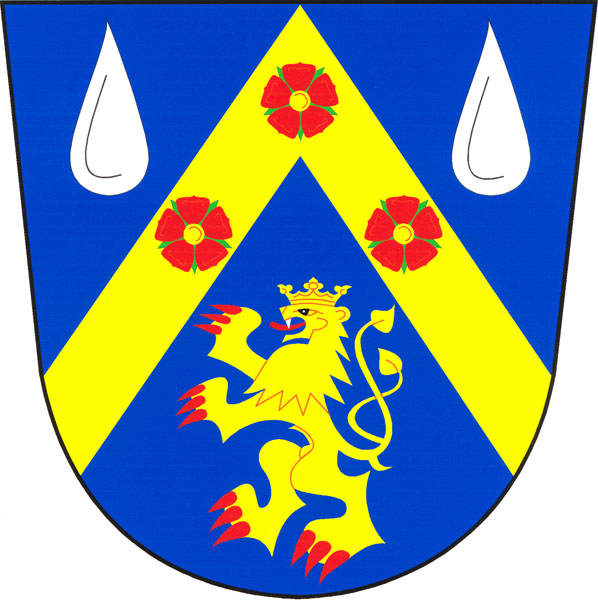
- Flag Coat of arms

- Location in the Czech Republic
- Coordinates: 49°56′36″N 13°42′16″E
- Country: Czech Republic
- Region: Plzeň
- District: Rokycany
- First mentioned: 1045

Area
  - Total: 8.62 km^{2} (3.33 sq mi)
- Elevation: 398 m (1,306 ft)

Population (2026-01-01)
  - Total: 255
  - Density: 29.6/km^{2} (76.6/sq mi)
- Time zone: UTC+1 (CET)
  - Summer (DST): UTC+2 (CEST)
- Postal code: 338 08
- Website: www.podmoklynadberounkou.cz

Podmokly is a municipality and village in Rokycany District in the Plzeň Region of the Czech Republic. It has about 300 inhabitants. The historic centre is well preserved and is protected as a village monument zone.

Podmokly lies approximately 24 kilometres (15 mi) north-east of Rokycany, 33 km (21 mi) north-east of Plzeň, and 54 km (34 mi) west of Prague.

== Demographics ==
Historical population
| Year | Pop. | ±% |
|---|---|---|
| 1869 | 889 | — |
| 1880 | 832 | −6.4% |
| 1890 | 744 | −10.6% |
| 1900 | 827 | +11.2% |
| 1910 | 755 | −8.7% |
| 1921 | 701 | −7.2% |
| 1930 | 670 | −4.4% |
| 1950 | 487 | −27.3% |
| 1961 | 457 | −6.2% |
| 1970 | 404 | −11.6% |
| 1980 | 325 | −19.6% |
| 1991 | 291 | −10.5% |
| 2001 | 254 | −12.7% |
| 2011 | 262 | +3.1% |
| 2021 | 256 | −2.3% |
Source: Censuses
