= Volduchy =

- Municipality
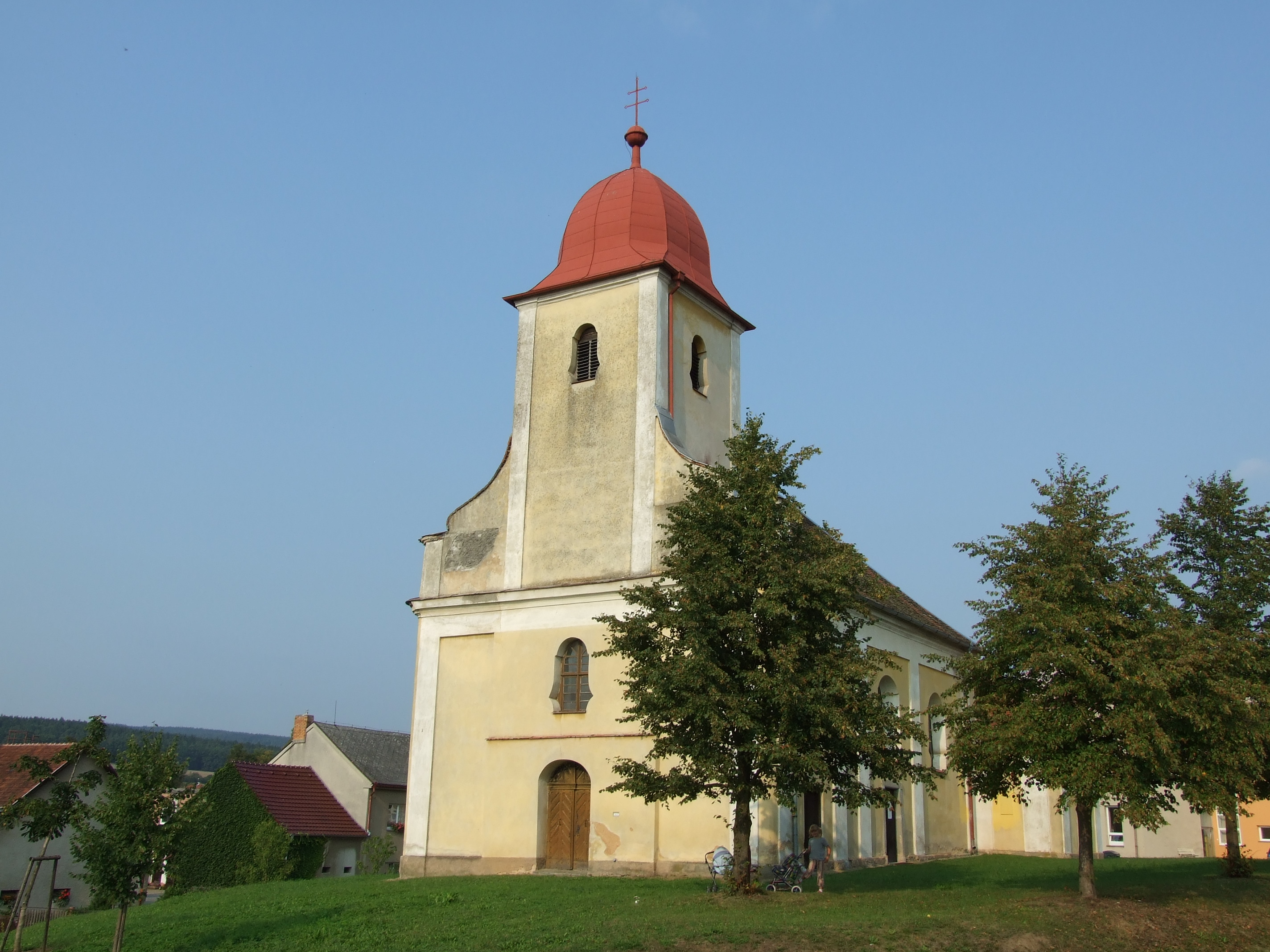
- Church of Saint Bartholomew

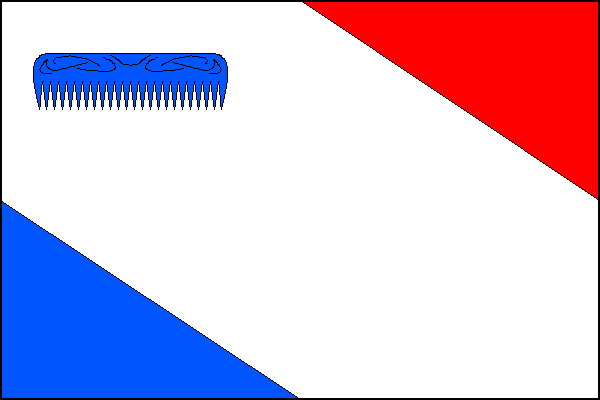
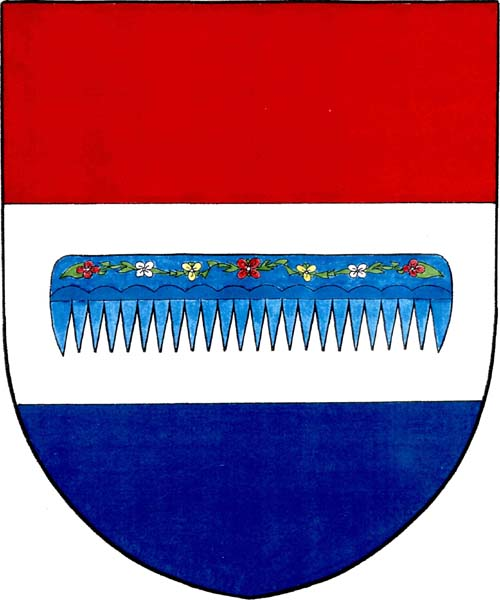
- Flag Coat of arms

- Location in the Czech Republic
- Coordinates: 49°46′46″N 13°37′45″E
- Country: Czech Republic
- Region: Plzeň
- District: Rokycany
- First mentioned: 1289

Area
  - Total: 12.59 km^{2} (4.86 sq mi)
- Elevation: 400 m (1,300 ft)

Population (2026-01-01)
  - Total: 1,263
  - Density: 100.3/km^{2} (259.8/sq mi)
- Time zone: UTC+1 (CET)
  - Summer (DST): UTC+2 (CEST)
- Postal code: 338 44
- Website: www.obec-volduchy.cz

Volduchy is a municipality and village in Rokycany District in the Plzeň Region of the Czech Republic. It has about 1,300 inhabitants.

Volduchy lies approximately 5 kilometres (3 mi) north-east of Rokycany, 19 km (12 mi) east of Plzeň, and 67 km (42 mi) south-west of Prague.

== Demographics ==
Historical population
Year	Pop.	±%
1869	1,394	—
1880	1,408	+1.0%
1890	1,400	−0.6%
1900	1,447	+3.4%
1910	1,450	+0.2%
1921	1,377	−5.0%
1930	1,478	+7.3%
1950	1,167	−21.0%
1961	1,199	+2.7%
1970	1,149	−4.2%
1980	1,094	−4.8%
1991	1,019	−6.9%
2001	1,002	−1.7%
2011	1,068	+6.6%
2021	1,253	+17.3%
Source: Censuses
