= Rokycany =

- Town
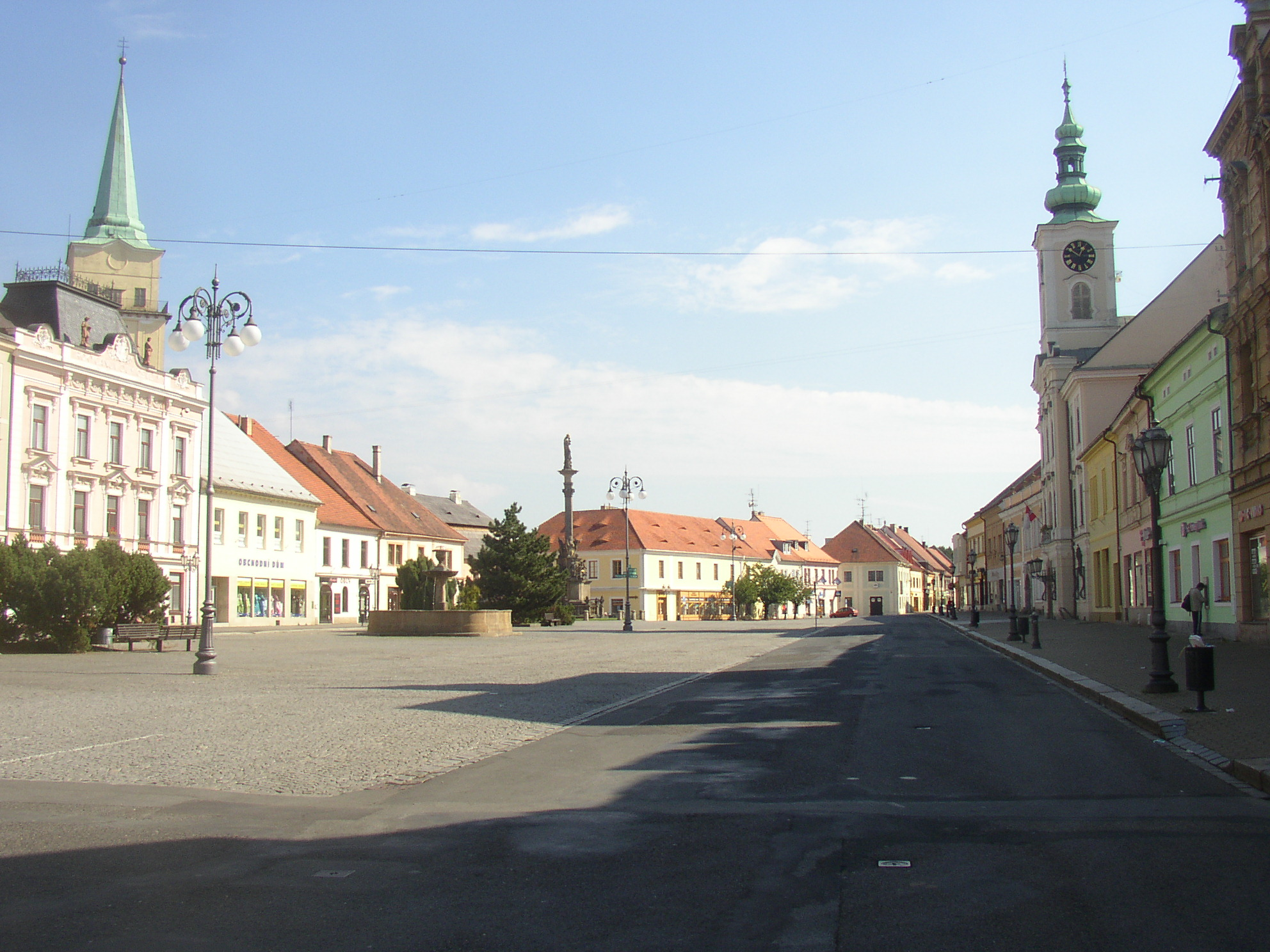
- Historic town centre

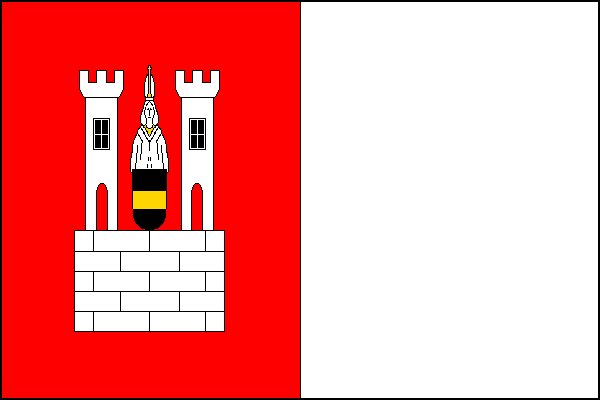
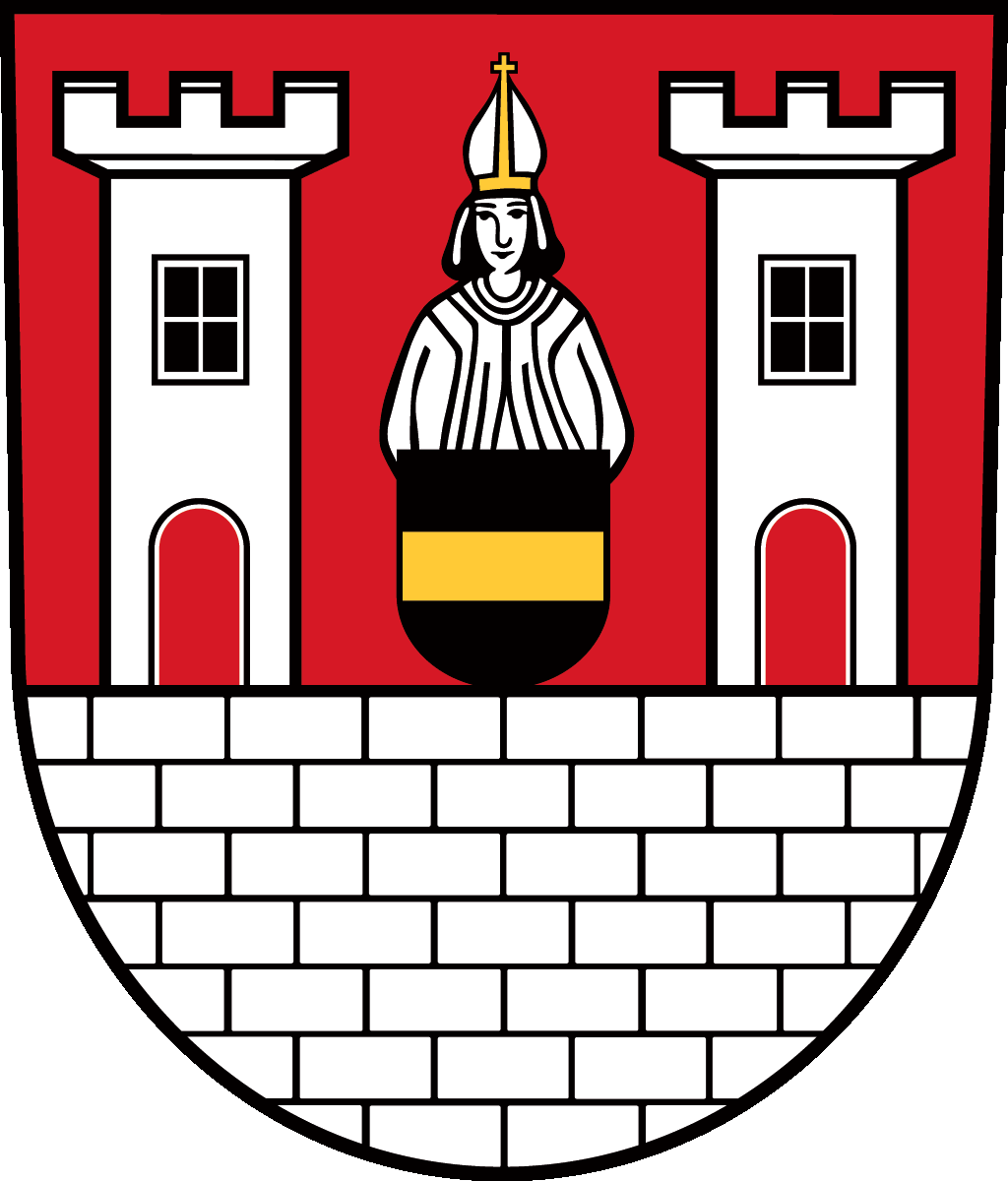
- Flag Coat of arms

- Location in the Czech Republic
- Coordinates: 49°44′33″N 13°35′44″E
- Country: Czech Republic
- Region: Plzeň
- District: Rokycany
- First mentioned: 1110

Government
  - Mayor: Tomáš Rada

Area
  - Total: 30.67 km^{2} (11.84 sq mi)
- Elevation: 362 m (1,188 ft)

Population (2026-01-01)
  - Total: 14,248
  - Density: 464.6/km^{2} (1,203/sq mi)
- Time zone: UTC+1 (CET)
  - Summer (DST): UTC+2 (CEST)
- Postal code: 337 01
- Website: www.rokycany.cz

Rokycany (Czech pronunciation: [ˈrokɪtsanɪ]; German: Rokitzan) is a town in the Plzeň Region of the Czech Republic. It has about 14,000 inhabitants. The town is located on the Klabava River in the Švihov Highlands.

Rokycany was founded in the early 12th century at the latest and became a town in 1406. The historic town centre is well preserved and is protected as an urban monument zone.

== Administrative division ==
Rokycany consists of four municipal parts (in brackets population according to the 2021 census):

- Nové Město (8,387)
- Plzeňské předměstí (3,359)
- Střed (1,565)
- Borek (447)

== Etymology ==
The term rokycan denoted a person who lives near willows (rokyty in Old Czech). The name Rokycany denoted a village of such people.

== Geography ==
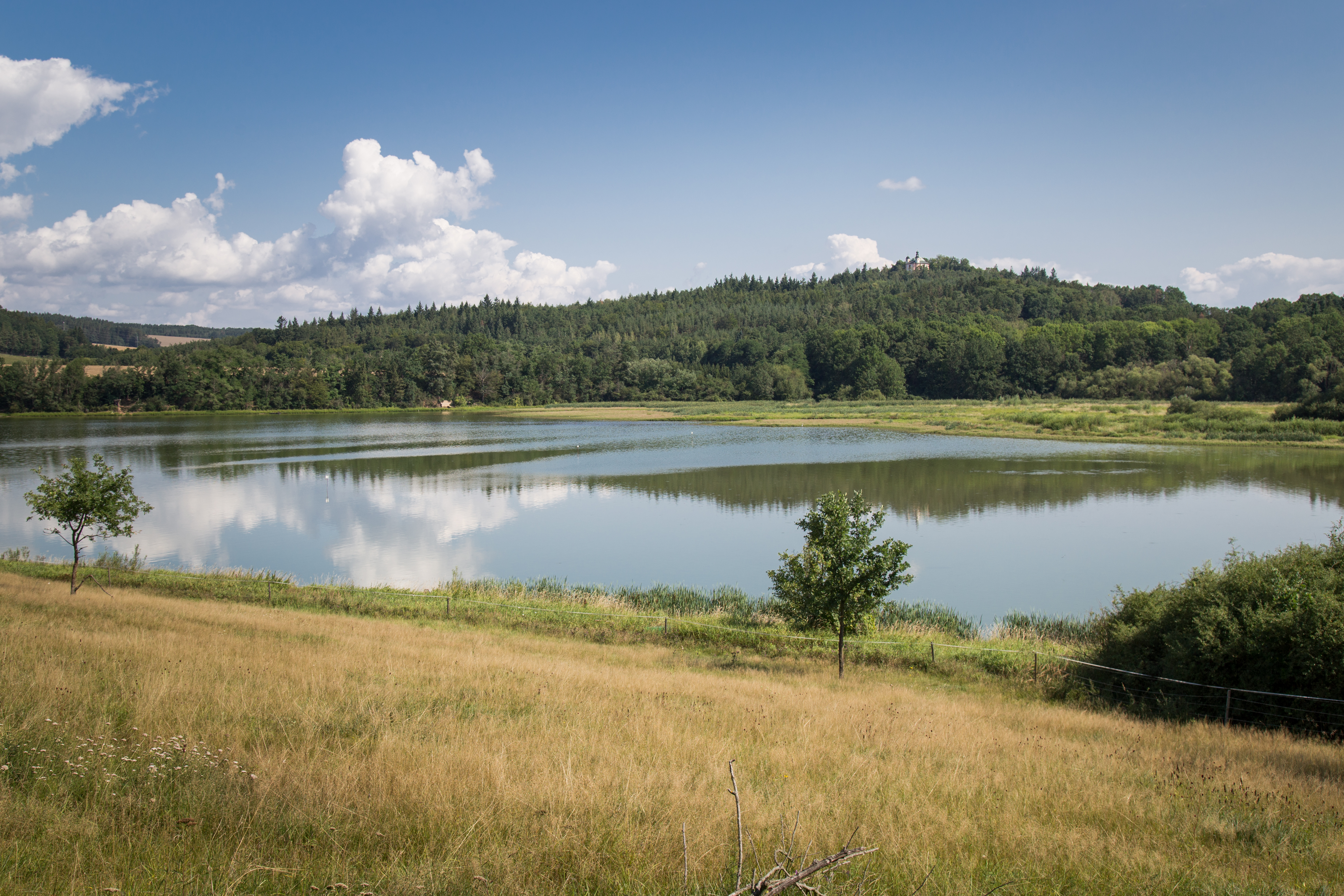
Klabava Reservoir

Rokycany is located about 14 kilometres (9 mi) east of Plzeň. It lies in the Švihov Highlands. The highest point is the Čilina hill at 523 m (1,716 ft) above sea level.

Rokycany is situated at the confluence of the Klabava River and the stream Holoubkovský potok. There is another stream (Rakovský potok) which flows through the western part of the town. The largest body of water is Klabava Reservoir with an area of 128 ha (320 acres). Today it serves as flood protection and as a recreational area. The second notable body of water is the fishpond Borecký rybník.

== History ==
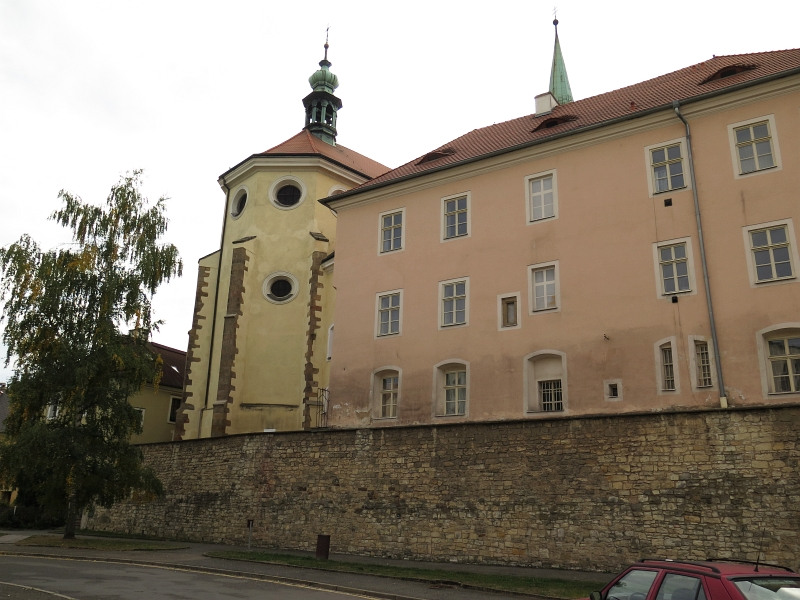
Fragments of the fortifications

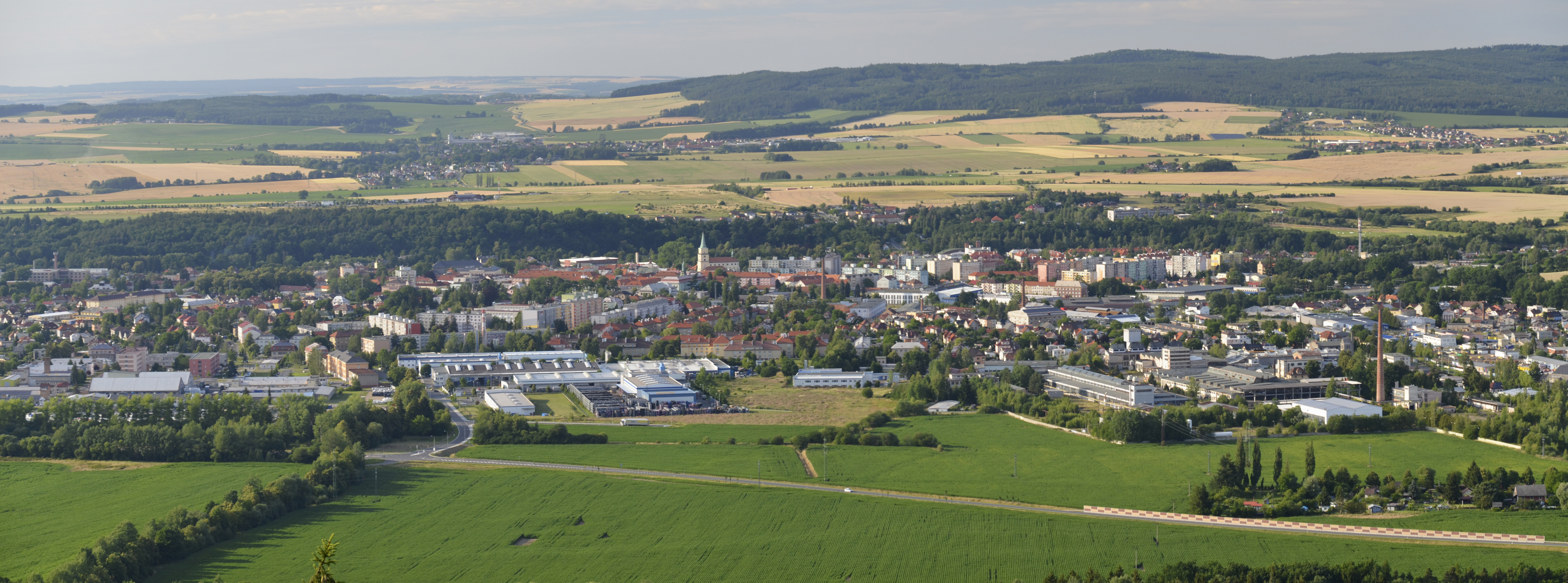
Panorama of Rokycany

The area was inhabited since the Stone Age. Celtic and early Slavic settlements were discovered. The first written mention of Rokycany is in Chronica Boemorum from 1110. At that time, the village was owned by the Bishop of Prague, and major Bohemian and German noblemen met here for diplomatic talks with Emperor Henry V.

At the end of the 13th century, bishop Tobiáš of Bechyně made from the settlement a market town and the episcopal court was replaced by an episcopal castle. In the 14th century, the town fortification was made, of which little has survived to this day. In 1406, Rokycany obtained town privileges. The town was a property of the church until the Hussite Wars. In 1421, the town was conquered by Jan Žižka's army, but later that year it was conquered, burned and looted by Plzeň's Catholics.

In 1436–1498, Rokycany was owned by the Lords of Švamberk and in 1498, it was bought by King Vladislaus II. In 1584, it was promoted by Emperor Rudolf II to a royal town. The prosperity came to an abrupt end with the Thirty Years' War. Rokycany was repeatedly afflicted by various armies, most notably by the Swedish army, which almost completely burned the town. The town was among the most destroyed Bohemian towns. Thanks to the ironworks and woodworking industry, the town began to flourish again. However, two huge fires in 1757 and 1784 deprived the town of its medieval character. Almost everything was destroyed, including municipal buildings, the town hall and the church.

Thanks to favorable economic conditions of the residents, the post-1784 renewal proceeded rather quickly. In the 1840s, it again became one of the most richest Bohemian towns. In the 19th century, the traditional iron-ore mining and processing industry became main source of Rokycany's economy. In 1862, Rokycany was connected via railway with Prague and Plzeň. Industrial development continued for most of the 20th century.

On 7 May 1945, Rokycany was liberated by the United States Army which halted its eastward advance here, meeting with the allied Soviet troops in the eastern part of the town (creating the so-called demarcation line). It was the very first meeting of United States Army and Soviet Army in Czechoslovakia. After 1945, most ethnic Germans were expelled.

In the post-World War II era, the development of the town was carried out in line with the ruling communist regime. The new massive construction activity focused on uniform tenement houses, from the 1960s built with concrete panels (so-called panelák). The local industry was further expanded and the life of the town was strongly influenced by strong army garrison (located in two barracks built in 1899 and 1933 respectively). In 1960, the neighbouring municipality of Borek was merged with Rokycany. In 1980, another three municipalities (Kamenný Újezd, Svojkovice and Litohlavy) joined Rokycany (however the first two have separated in 1990 and Litohlavy in 1994).

== Demographics ==
Historical population

Year	Pop.	±%
1869	4,660	—
1880	5,431	+16.5%
1890	5,554	+2.3%
1900	6,014	+8.3%
1910	7,078	+17.7%

Year	Pop.	±%
1921	7,346	+3.8%
1930	8,330	+13.4%
1950	9,216	+10.6%
1961	11,934	+29.5%
1970	12,585	+5.5%

Year	Pop.	±%
1980	13,555	+7.7%
1991	14,731	+8.7%
2001	14,305	−2.9%
2011	13,989	−2.2%
2021	13,758	−1.7%

Source: Censuses

== Economy ==
The largest employer with headquarters in the town is a branch of Hutchinson SA. It is engaged in the production of rubber products.

== Transport ==
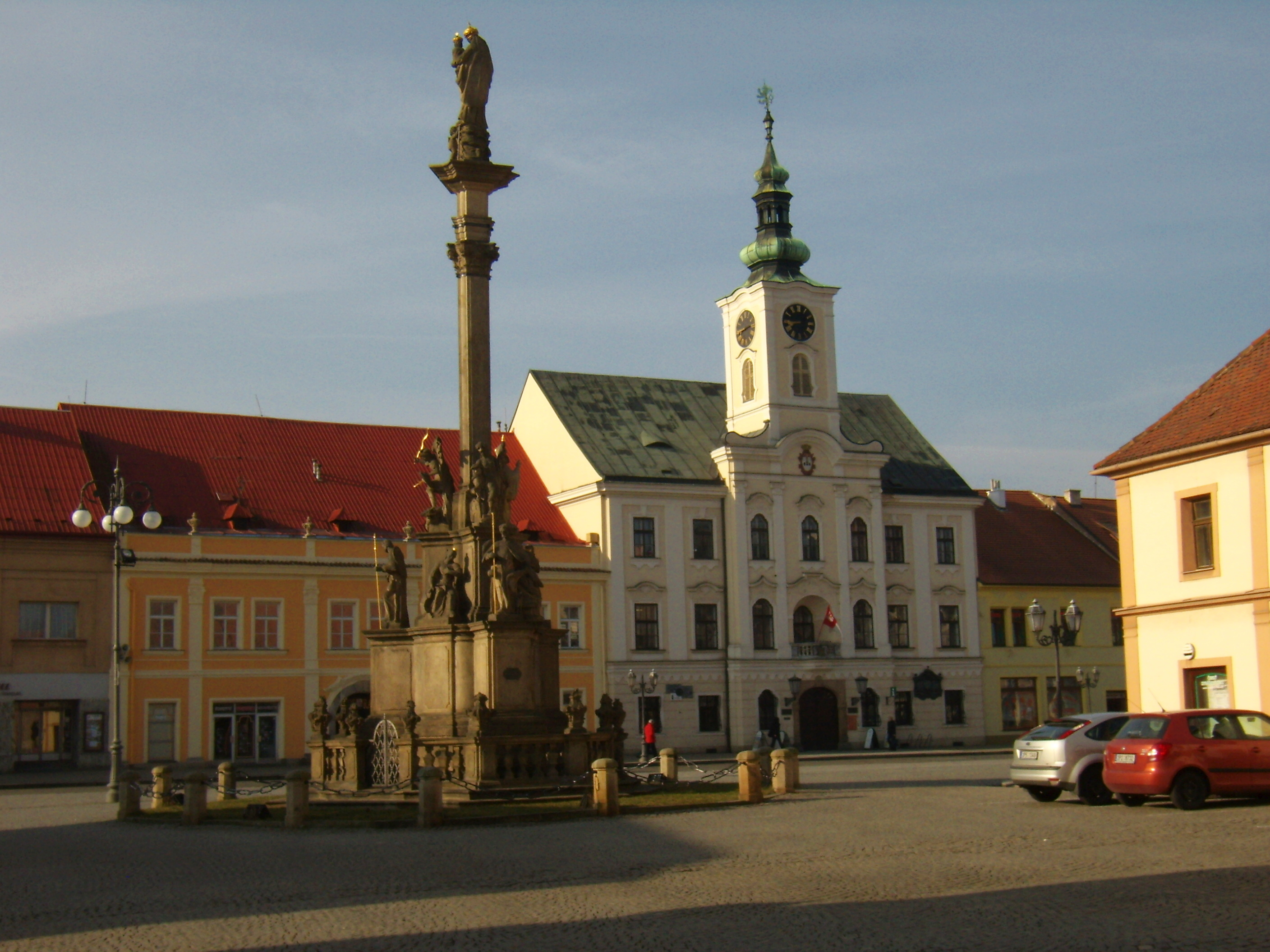
Town hall and the Marian column

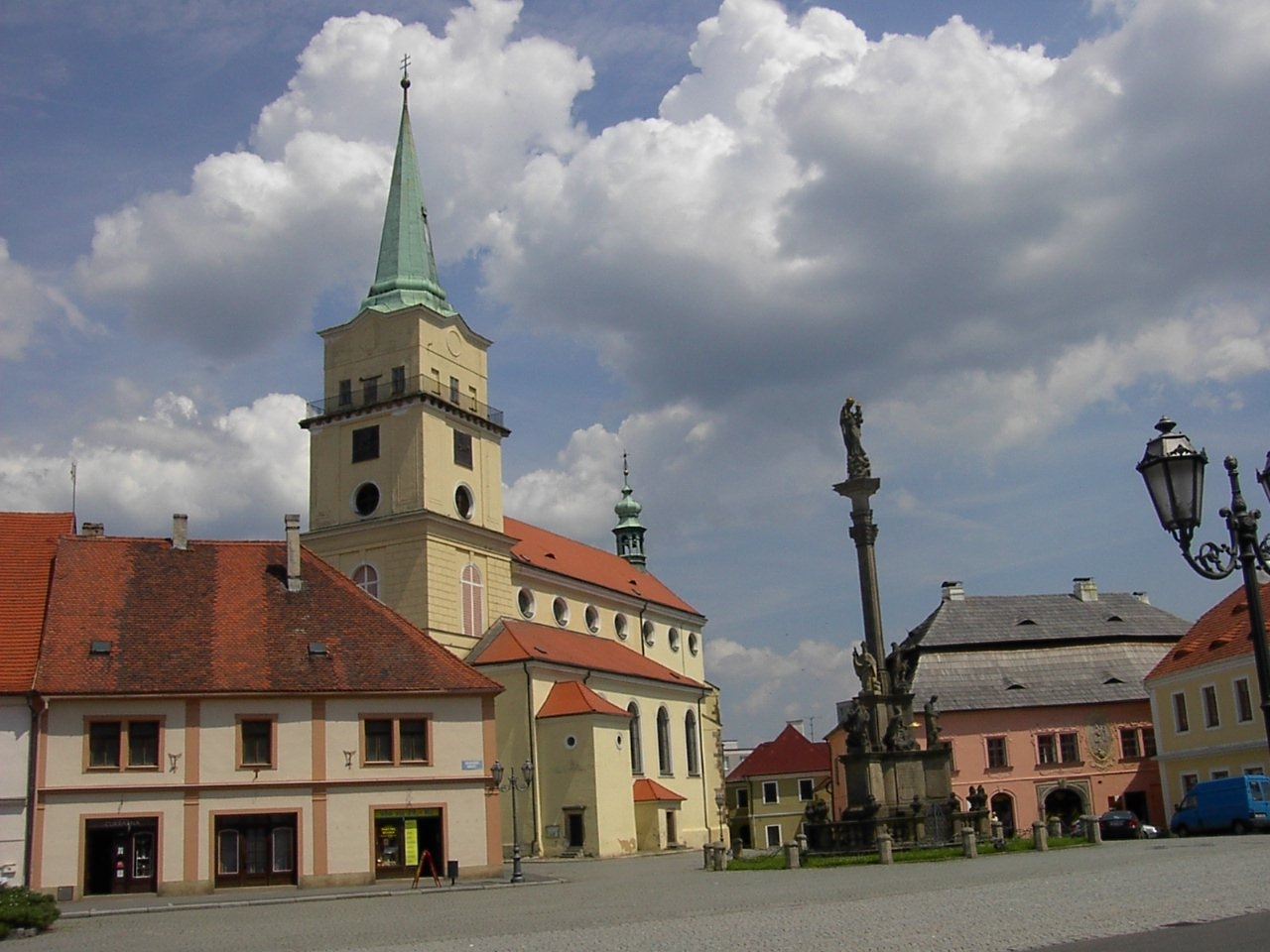
Church of Our Lady of the Snows and Dumet's House (right)

The D5 motorway runs through the northern part of the municipal territory.

Rokycany is located on the railway line Prague–Klatovy via Plzeň.

== Culture ==
Rokycany hosts Fluff Fest, a vegan hardcore punk festival which draws several thousand visitors from across Europe every July. It is held at the Rokycany airfield, having moved there in 2006 from its original location in Plzeň. The festival has been described as a yearly "strain" on the town, which is otherwise unaccustomed to large numbers of foreign visitors and extreme music adherents, and brings a business boom especially in sales of vegetarian and vegan food.

== Sights ==
The square Masarykovo náměstí is in the historic core of Rokycany and contains most of town's cultural monuments. The town hall is a Baroque building by the architect Ignác Jan Nepomuk Palliardi, built in 1804–1808. The stone Baroque fountain from 1827 stands in front of the so-called "Rokycan's House of Enlightenment". In the mid-19th century, this Neo-Renaissance building and the town hall were two only two-storey houses in the square.

The Church of Our Lady of the Snows is located in the northeastern part of the square. It stands on the place of the episcopal court, mentioned already in 1110. It was built in the Gothic style in the 14th century. After a large fire, it was rebuilt in the Neoclassical style by Palliardi in 1785–1788.

The Dumet's House next to the church was first mentioned in 1512, however it probably exists much longer. In 1784–1787, it served as a school, but it burned down. Nowadays it has a Rococo façade with stucco decorations.

== Notable people ==
- Jan Rokycana (c. 1396–1471), Hussite theologian
- Antonín Kraft (1749–1820), cellist and composer
- Adolf Kraus (1850–1928), Chicago lawyer, B'nai B'rith officer; lived here
- Paula Deppe (1886–1922), Sudeten German painter
- Čestmír Řanda (1923–1986), actor
- Vlastimil Válek (1938–1989), motorcycle racer
- Ivan Kusnjer (born 1951), opera singer
- Věra Bílá (1954–2019), singer
- Jiří Pehe (born 1955), political analyst and writer
- Jaroslav Špaček (born 1974), ice hockey player
- Vhrsti (born 1975), illustrator
- Václav Procházka (born 1984), footballer

== Twin towns – sister cities ==
Rokycany is twinned with:

- Greiz, Germany
- Pfinztal, Germany
