= Vlkov =

Vlkov may refer to places in the Czech Republic:

- Vlkov (České Budějovice District), a municipality and village in the South Bohemian Region
- Vlkov (Náchod District), a municipality and village in the Hradec Králové Region
- Vlkov (Tábor District), a municipality and village in the South Bohemian Region
- Vlkov (Žďár nad Sázavou District), a municipality and village in the Vysočina Region
- Vlkov pod Oškobrhem, a municipality and village in the Central Bohemian Region
- Vlkov, a village and part of Čakov (Benešov District) in the Central Bohemian Region
- Vlkov, a village and part of Děkov in the Central Bohemian Region
- Vlkov, a village and part of Dobřeň in the Central Bohemian Region
- Vlkov, a village and part of Nová Paka in the Hradec Králové Region
- Vlkov, a village and part of Spálené Poříčí in the Plzeň Region
- Vlkov, a village and part of Stvolová in the South Moravian Region
