= Borovno =

- Municipality
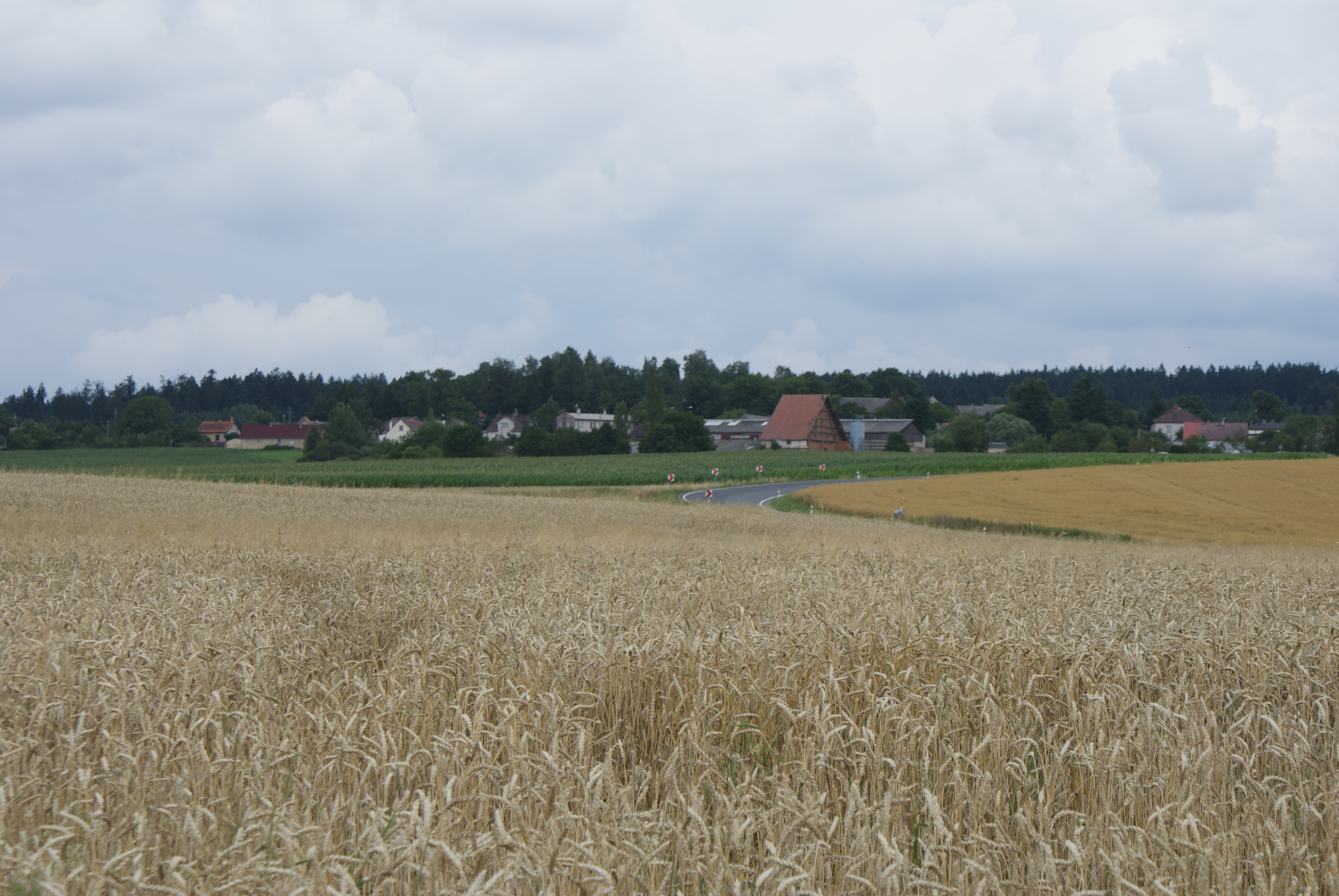
- General view

- Coat of arms

- Location in the Czech Republic
- Coordinates: 49°37′19″N 13°41′26″E
- Country: Czech Republic
- Region: Plzeň
- District: Plzeň-South
- First mentioned: 1379

Area
  - Total: 3.26 km^{2} (1.26 sq mi)
- Elevation: 582 m (1,909 ft)

Population (2026-01-01)
  - Total: 100
  - Density: 31/km^{2} (79/sq mi)
- Time zone: UTC+1 (CET)
  - Summer (DST): UTC+2 (CEST)
- Postal code: 335 61
- Website: www.borovno.cz

Borovno (German: Borowno) is a municipality and village in Plzeň-South District in the Plzeň Region of the Czech Republic. It has about 100 inhabitants.

== Etymology ==
The name was derived from the Czech word borovice, borový les ("pine, pine forest"), which refers to the composition of the local forest at the time of the settlement of the area.

== Geography ==
Borovno is located about 24 kilometres (15 mi) southeast of Plzeň. The western part of the municipal territory with the village lies in the Švihov Highlands, but most of the territory of Borovno lies in a forested landscape of the Brdy Highlands. The highest point is at 645 m (2,116 ft) above sea level. The Bradava Stream flows along the southern municipal border and supplies three small fishponds.

== History ==
Borovno was founded in the 14th century at the latest, during the settlement of the area by the Lords of Rožmitál. Later it was merged with the Mirošov estate and from 1616, it was part of the Spálené Poříčí estate. The greatest development of Borovno occurred at the end of the 18th century, when smelters were established in the vicinity of the village. In the early 19th century, the development ended.

In 1945, at the end of World War II, Borovno was liberated by American troops who stopped their advance here. From 1968 to 1990, a military base of the Warsaw Pact armies was located in the territory of Borovno.

From 1980 to 1990, Borovno was merged with the town of Spálené Poříčí. Since 1 September 1990, the municipality has been independent again.

== Demographics ==
Historical population

Year	Pop.	±%
1869	345	—
1880	363	+5.2%
1890	325	−10.5%
1900	298	−8.3%
1910	280	−6.0%

Year	Pop.	±%
1921	249	−11.1%
1930	218	−12.4%
1950	176	−19.3%
1961	157	−10.8%
1970	150	−4.5%

Year	Pop.	±%
1980	140	−6.7%
1991	114	−18.6%
2001	92	−19.3%
2011	92	+0.0%
2021	90	−2.2%

Source: Censuses

== Transport ==
The I/19 road (the section connecting Plzeň with Tábor) runs through the municipality.

== Sights ==
A remnant of the military base is Javor 51, a unique concrete warehouse that was used to store nuclear munitions. Today it is open to the public as the Atom Museum.
