= Dobřív =

- Municipality
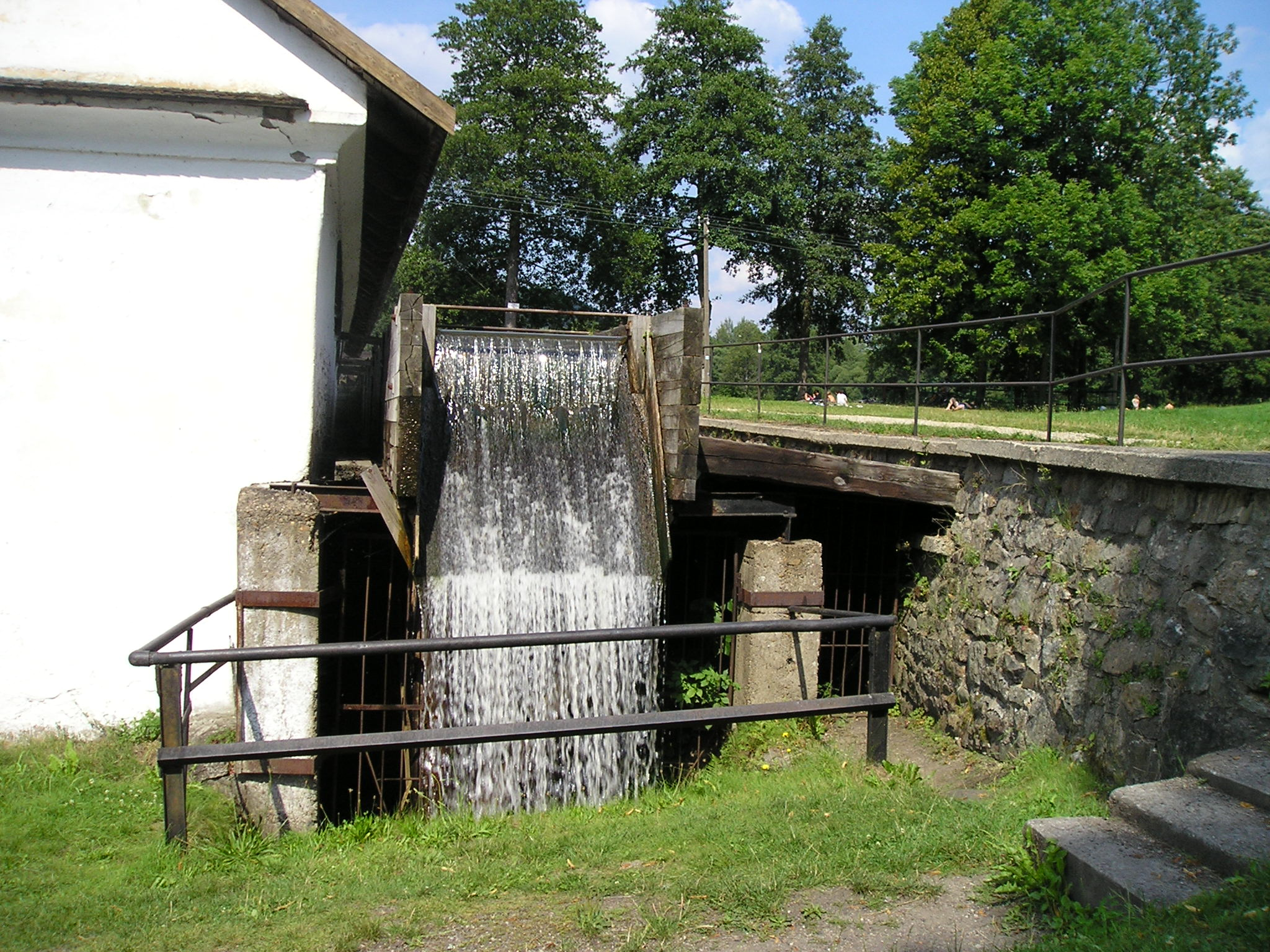
- Hammer Mill at Dobřív

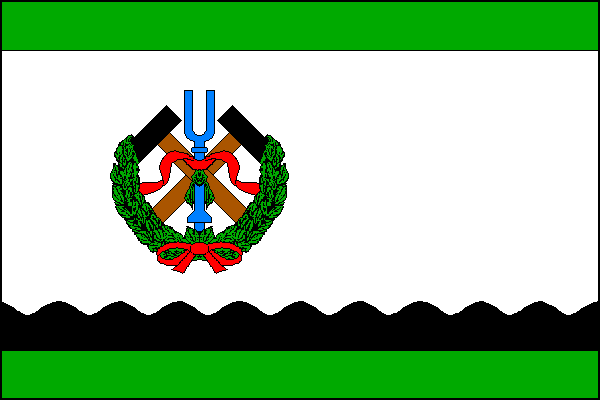
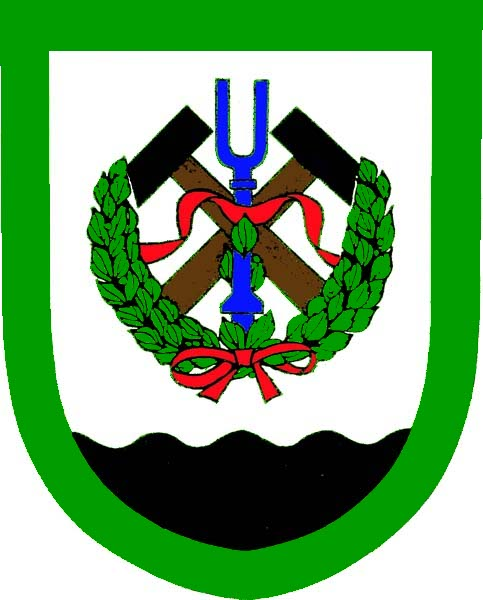
- Flag Coat of arms

- Location in the Czech Republic
- Coordinates: 49°42′56″N 13°41′13″E
- Country: Czech Republic
- Region: Plzeň
- District: Rokycany
- First mentioned: 1325

Area
  - Total: 27.11 km^{2} (10.47 sq mi)
- Elevation: 417 m (1,368 ft)

Population (2026-01-01)
  - Total: 1,351
  - Density: 49.83/km^{2} (129.1/sq mi)
- Time zone: UTC+1 (CET)
  - Summer (DST): UTC+2 (CEST)
- Postal code: 338 44
- Website: www.dobriv.rokycansko.cz

Dobřív is a municipality and village in Rokycany District in the Plzeň Region of the Czech Republic. It has about 1,400 inhabitants. The municipality is known for its unique hammer mill. The historic centre is well preserved and is protected as a village monument zone.

== Administrative division ==
Dobřív consists of two municipal parts (in brackets population according to the 2021 census):

- Dobřív (1,053)
- Pavlovsko (244)

== Etymology ==
The initial name of the village was probably Dobřejov. The name was derived from the personal name Dobřej, meaning "Dobřej's (court)".

== Geography ==
Dobřív is located about 7 kilometres (4 mi) southeast of Rokycany and 21 km (13 mi) east of Plzeň. It lies in the Brdy Highlands. The highest point is the Žďár hill at 629 m (2,064 ft). The eastern part of the municipal territory belongs to the Brdy Protected Landscape Area and includes several other hills with an altitude of more than 600 m. The Klabava River flows through the municipality.

== History ==
The first written mention of Dobřív is from 1325.

== Demographics ==
Historical population

Year	Pop.	±%
1869	1,255	—
1880	1,410	+12.4%
1890	1,442	+2.3%
1900	1,531	+6.2%
1910	1,317	−14.0%

Year	Pop.	±%
1921	1,364	+3.6%
1930	1,317	−3.4%
1950	1,537	+16.7%
1961	1,508	−1.9%
1970	1,159	−23.1%

Year	Pop.	±%
1980	999	−13.8%
1991	1,007	+0.8%
2001	1,063	+5.6%
2011	1,226	+15.3%
2021	1,297	+5.8%

Source: Censuses

== Transport ==
The railway line Rokycany–Příkosice passes through the western part of the municipality, but there is no train station. The municipality is served by the station in neighbouring Mirošov.

== Sights ==
Dobřív is known for its hammer mill, which is a very rare example of a fully functioning water powered forge. The earliest record of a smelter is Dobřív is from 1505 and existence of hammer mills is proven since 1614. For its value, the hammer mill is protected as a national cultural monument.

Swedish Stone Bridge is a technical monument from the 17th century. It has one seven-metre arch with a height of 4 metres. On the bridge is a statue of a woman, which is probably Saint Barbara, and in front of the bridge is a statue of Saint John of Nepomuk from the 18th century.
