= Dekov =

Dekov may refer to:

- Děkov, a village in the Czech Republic
- Dekov, Pleven Province, a village in Belene Municipality, Bulgaria
