= Hrádek (Rokycany District) =

- Town
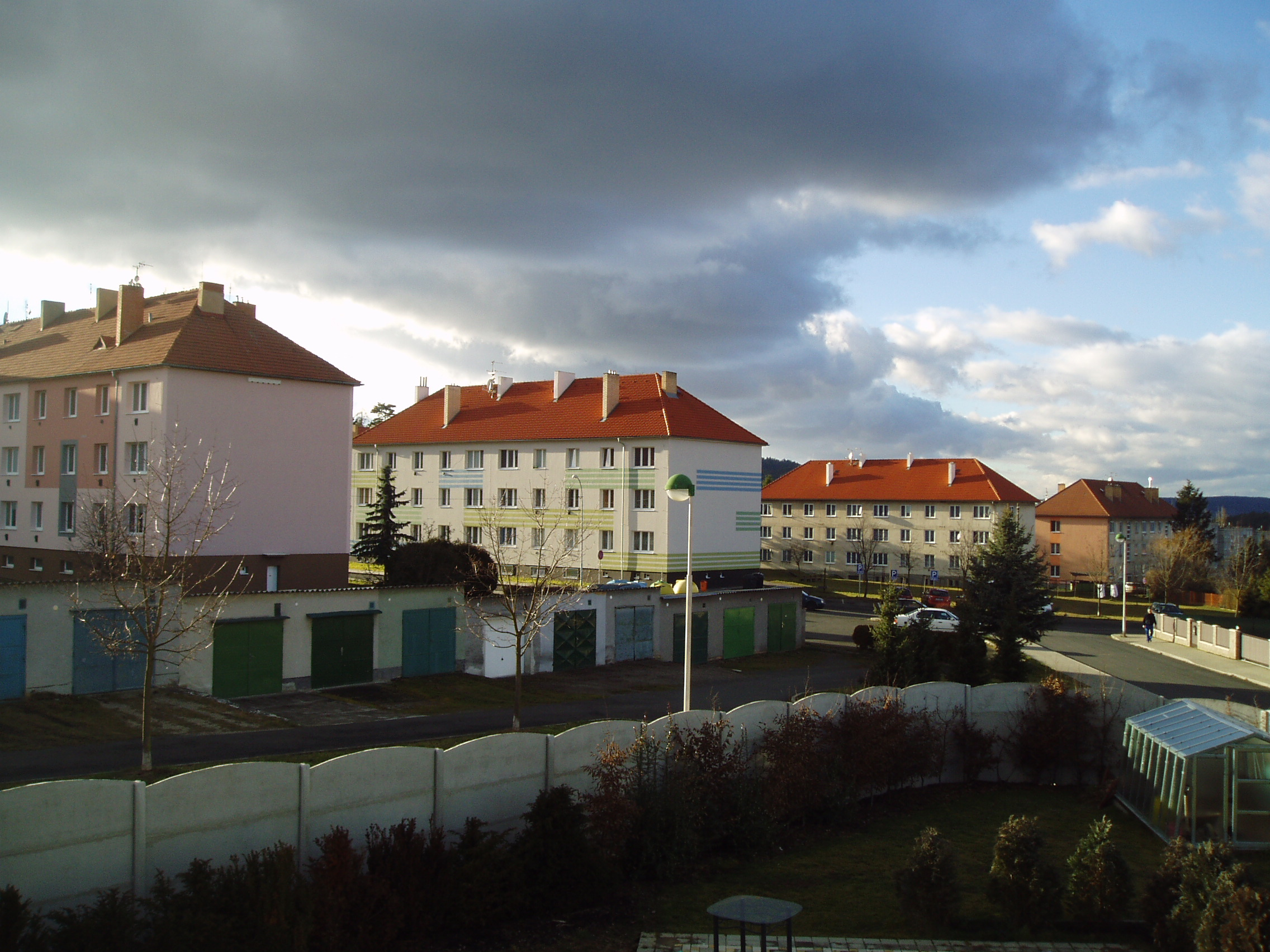
- Former houses of ironworks workers

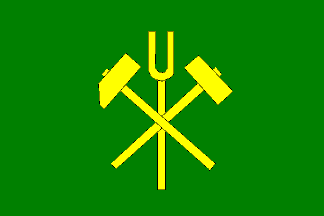
- Flag Coat of arms

- Location in the Czech Republic
- Coordinates: 49°42′47″N 13°39′17″E
- Country: Czech Republic
- Region: Plzeň
- District: Rokycany
- First mentioned: 1325

Government
  - Mayor: Marcela Sobotková

Area
  - Total: 6.05 km^{2} (2.34 sq mi)
- Elevation: 440 m (1,440 ft)

Population (2026-01-01)
  - Total: 2,705
  - Density: 447/km^{2} (1,160/sq mi)
- Time zone: UTC+1 (CET)
  - Summer (DST): UTC+2 (CEST)
- Postal code: 338 42
- Website: www.mestohradek-ro.cz

Hrádek (Czech pronunciation: [ˈɦraːdɛk]; German: Hradek) is a town in Rokycany District in the Plzeň Region of the Czech Republic. It has about 2,700 inhabitants. It is an industrial centre.

== Administrative division ==
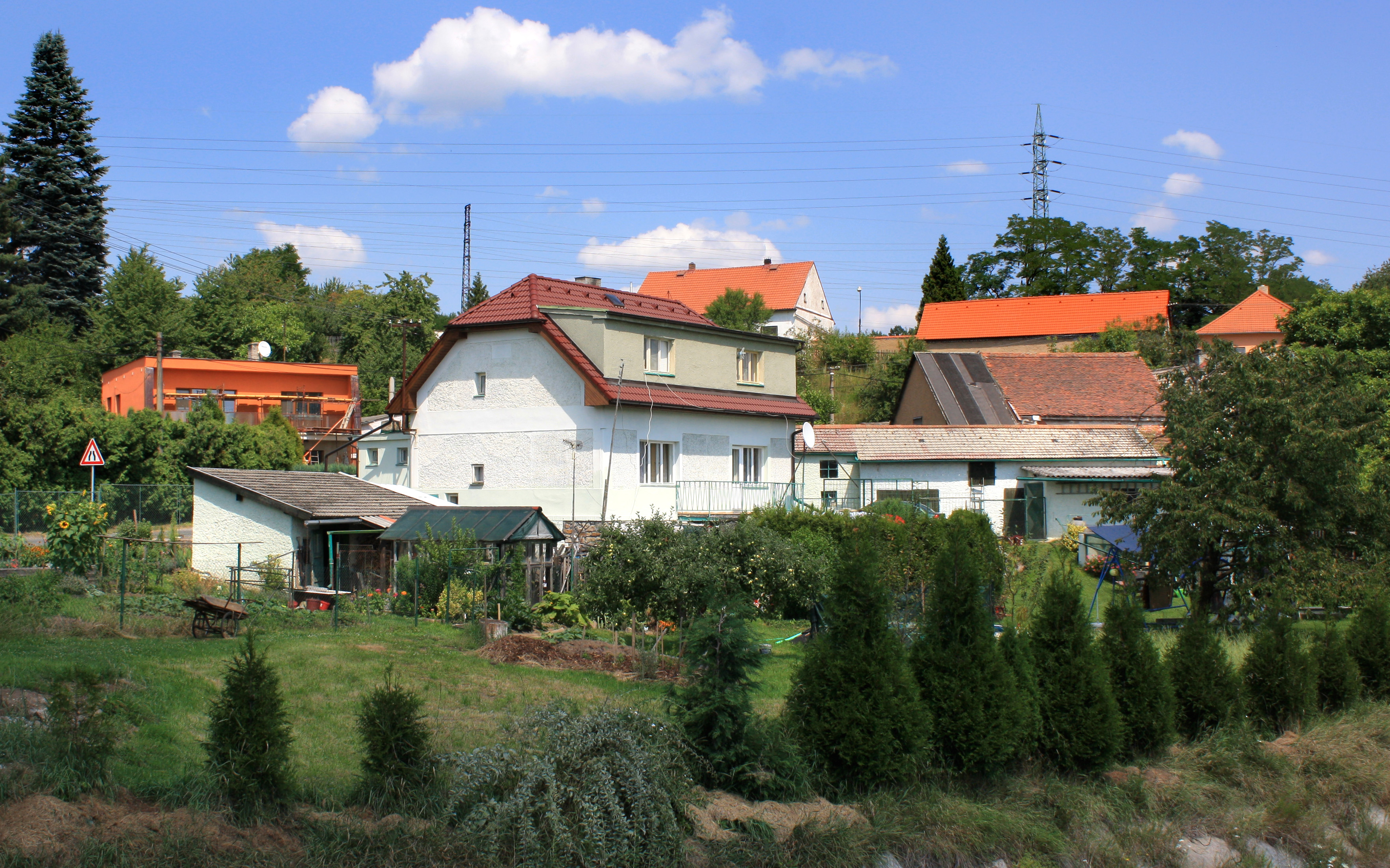
Nová Huť

Hrádek consists of two municipal parts (in brackets population according to the 2021 census):

- Hrádek (767)
- Nová Huť (1,955)

== Etymology ==
The Czech word hrádek (a diminutive from hrad) means 'small castle'.

== Geography ==
Hrádek is located about 5 kilometres (3 mi) southeast of Rokycany and 18 km (11 mi) east of Plzeň. Most of the municipal territory lies in the Švihov Highlands. The northern forested part extends into the Brdy Highlands and includes the highest point of Hrádek, the hill Hrádecký vrch at 549 m (1,801 ft) above sea level.

Hrádek is situated in the valley of the Klabava River. It lies in a plateau on the left bank of the river. Hrádek together with Rokycany and Kamenný Újezd forms a contiguous built-up area along the Klabava River.

== History ==
The first written mention of Hrádek is from 1325, when King John of Bohemia donated Hrádek to Peter I of Rosenberg. The village of Nová Huť (literally 'new smelter') gained its name in 1854.

Since Middle Ages the Klabava valley region specialised in iron ore mining and iron production. This industrial aspect was further strengthened in the 20th century when both communities (Hrádek and Nová Huť) formed functionally one settlement with their economy centered around the Hrádecké železárny ironworks. Later both villages merged into one municipality.

After World War II, local steelworks have expanded filling most of the area along the Klabava River. These investments were accompanied by massive residential construction that completely transformed Hrádek. New housing project grew in area between old Hrádek and Nová Huť villages covering the plateau south of the Klabava River. Rapid population growth followed and Hrádek acquired urban character. In 1970, Hrádek was promoted to a town.

== Demographics ==
Historical population

Year	Pop.	±%
1869	691	—
1880	780	+12.9%
1890	660	−15.4%
1900	612	−7.3%
1910	689	+12.6%

Year	Pop.	±%
1921	758	+10.0%
1930	933	+23.1%
1950	1,147	+22.9%
1961	2,174	+89.5%
1970	2,859	+31.5%

Year	Pop.	±%
1980	3,358	+17.5%
1991	3,052	−9.1%
2001	2,900	−5.0%
2011	2,844	−1.9%
2021	2,722	−4.3%

Source: Censuses

== Economy ==
After 1989, Hrádecké železárny ironworks went through transformation. In 1996, it became part of Z-Group Steel Holding company.

In 1998, Borgers company opened new factory in the town. It produces textile components for automotive industry.

== Transport ==
Hrádek is located on the railway line of local importance leading from Rokycany to Příkosice.

== Sights ==
The only protected cultural monument in Hrádek is a rural wooden house from the turn of the 18th and 19th centuries.

== Notable people ==
- Vladimír Jirásek (1933–2018), slalom canoeist
