= Kamenný Újezd =

Kamenný Újezd may refer to places in the Czech Republic:

- Kamenný Újezd (České Budějovice District), a municipality and village in the South Bohemian Region
- Kamenný Újezd (Rokycany District), a municipality and village in the Plzeň Region
- Kamenný Újezd, a village and part of Nýřany in the Plzeň Region

== See also ==
- 12833 Kamenný Újezd, an asteroid
