= Čakov =

Čakov may refer to places in the Czech Republic:

- Čakov (Benešov District), a municipality and village in the Central Bohemian Region
- Čakov (České Budějovice District), a municipality and village in the South Bohemian Region
