= Klabava (river) =

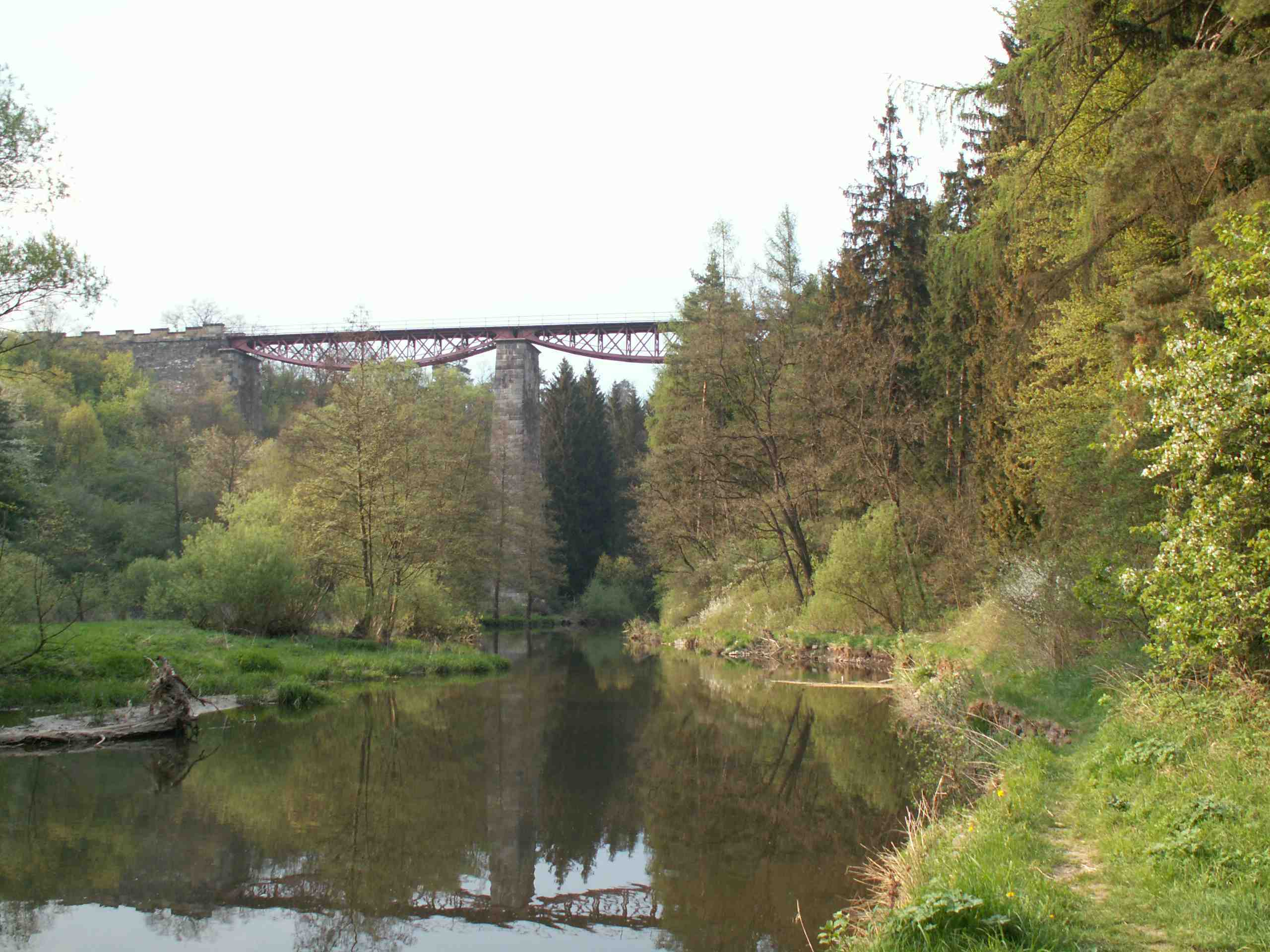
- The Klabava in Chrást

Location
- Country: Czech Republic
- Regions: Plzeň; Central Bohemian

Physical characteristics
- Source
  - location: Věšín, Brdy Highlands
  - coordinates: 49°39′54″N 13°48′23″E
  - elevation: 760 m (2,493 ft)
- Mouth
  - location: Berounka
  - coordinates: 49°48′41″N 13°29′54″E
  - elevation: 285 m (935 ft)
- Length: 51.2 km (31.8 mi)
- Basin size: 373.1 km^{2} (144.1 sq mi)
- Discharge
  - average: 2.10 m^{3}/s (74 cu ft/s) near estuary

Basin features
- Progression: Berounka→ Vltava→ Elbe→ North Sea

The Klabava (Czech pronunciation: [ˈklabava]) is a river in the Czech Republic, a right tributary of the Berounka River. It flows through the Plzeň and Central Bohemian regions. It is 51.2 km (31.8 mi) long.

== Etymology ==
The origin of the name is uncertain. The name probably originated in the 14th century and was derived from the old Czech verbs klabati ('to cut down') or klábati ('to chatter'). There is also a theory that the name has its root in the Slovenian word klabotina, i.e. 'alluvium'. The village of Klabava was named after the river.

== Characteristic ==
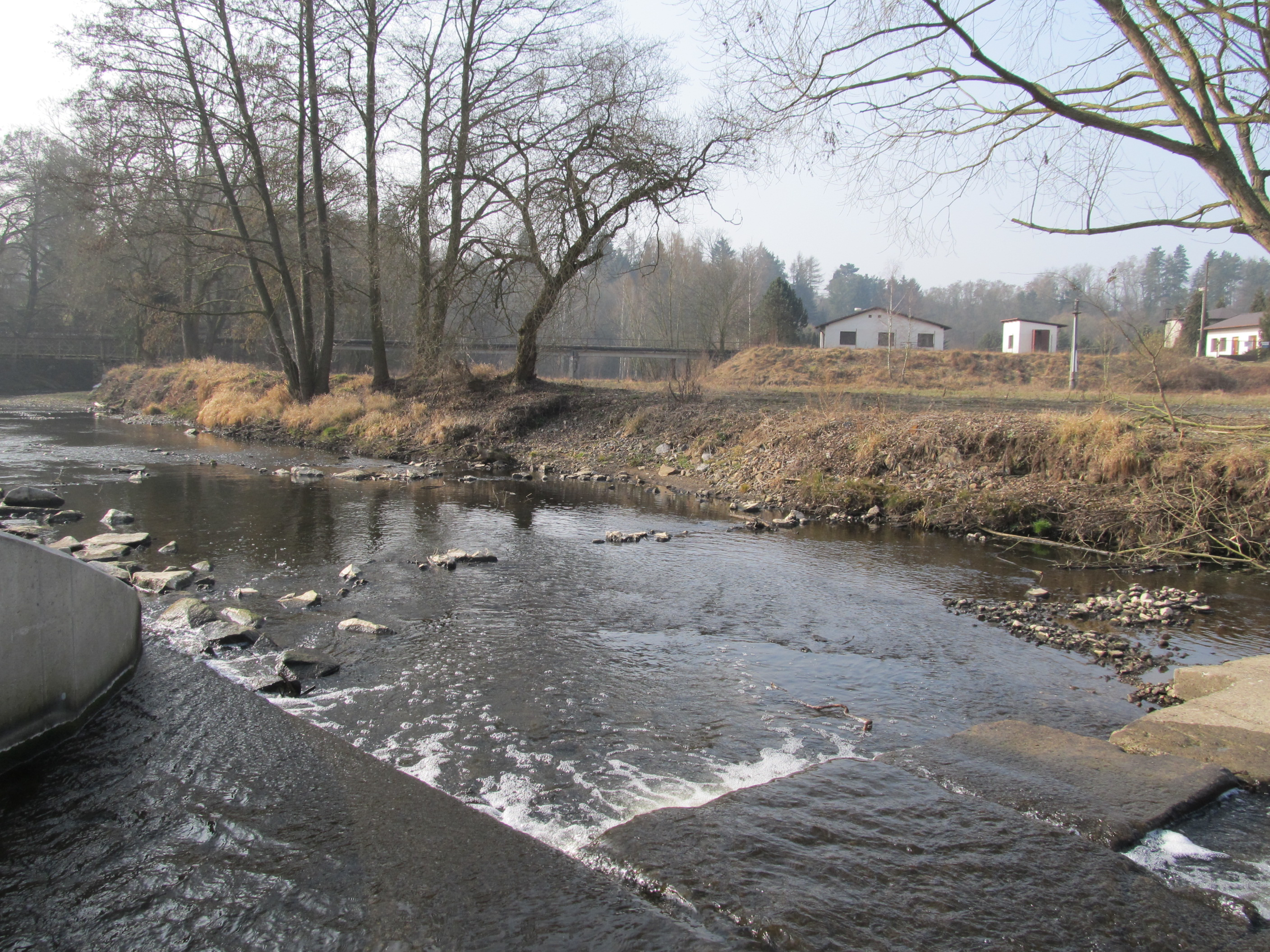
The Klabava in Dýšina-Nová Huť

The Klabava originates in the territory of Věšín in the Brdy Highlands at an elevation of 760 m (2,493 ft) and flows to Oslov, where it enters the Berounka River at an elevation of 285 m (935 ft). It is 51.2 km (31.8 mi) long. Its drainage basin has an area of 373.1 km^{2} (144.1 sq mi).

The longest tributaries of the Klabava are:

Tributary	Length (km)	Side
Holoubkovský potok	23.5	right
Voldušský potok	13.8	right
Skořický potok	9.1	left

== Course ==
The most important settlement on the river is the town of Rokycany. The river flows through the municipal territories of Věšín, Strašice, Dobřív, Medový Újezd, Hůrky, Hrádek, Kamenný Újezd, Rokycany, Klabava, Ejpovice, Kyšice, Dýšina and Chrást.

== Bodies of water ==
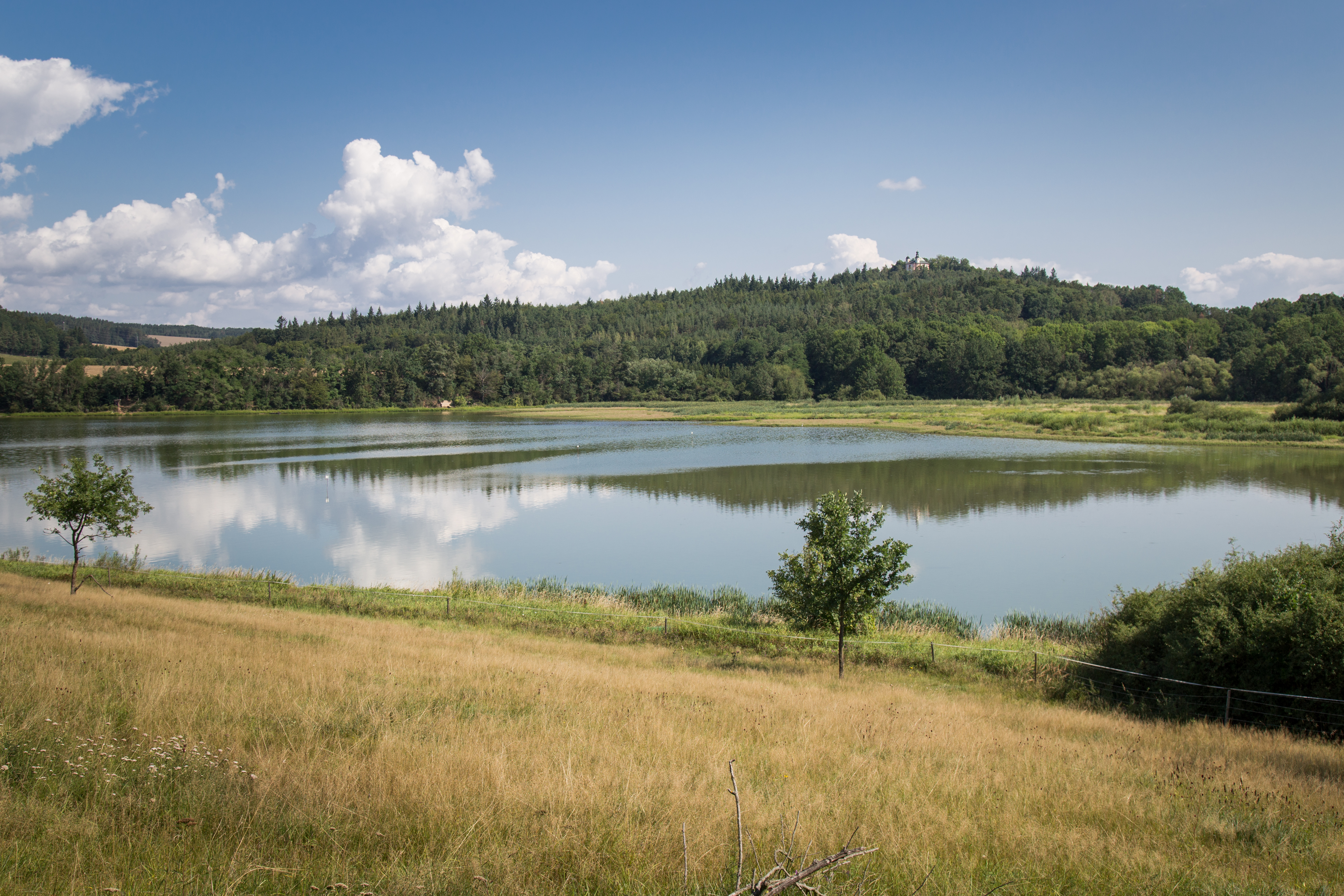
Klabava Reservoir

There are 245 bodies of water in the basin area. The largest of them is the fishpond Hořejší Padrťský rybník with an area of 78.8 ha (195 acres), supplied by several small tributaries of the Klabava. Two reservoirs are built on the lower course of the river: Klabava and Ejpovice.

The Klabava Reservoir was built in 1957. The flooded area is 128 ha (320 acres). The original purpose was to divert the river for iron ore mining, but after mining ended and the quarry flooded in 1975, the reservoir lost its purpose. Today it is used to ensure minimum flow of the river, for recreation, fishing and flood protection.

The Ejpovice Reservoir has an area of 44 ha (110 acres). It was created by the flooding of the quarry after the iron ore mining ceased in 1967. It is used for recreation and sports.

== Protection of nature ==
The upper course of the river flows through the Brdy Protected Landscape Area.

== Tourism ==
The Klabava is occasionally suitable for river tourism, but only in spring or after heavy rains. About 15 km (9 mi) of the river is navigable.

== See also ==
- List of rivers of the Czech Republic
