= Kamenný Újezd (Rokycany District) =

- Municipality
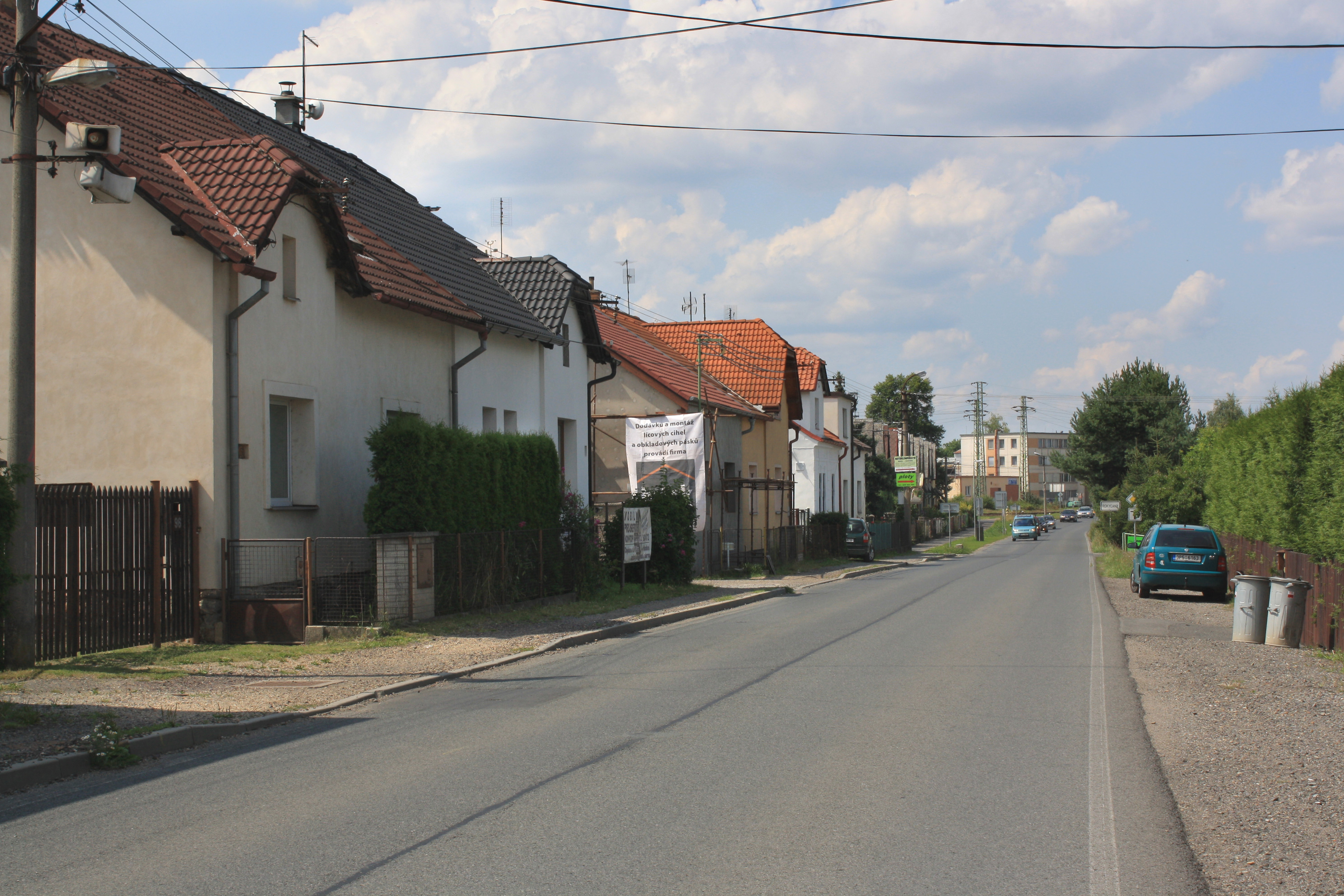
- Main road

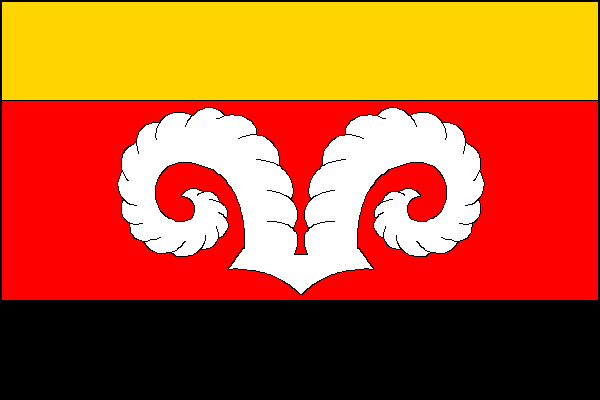
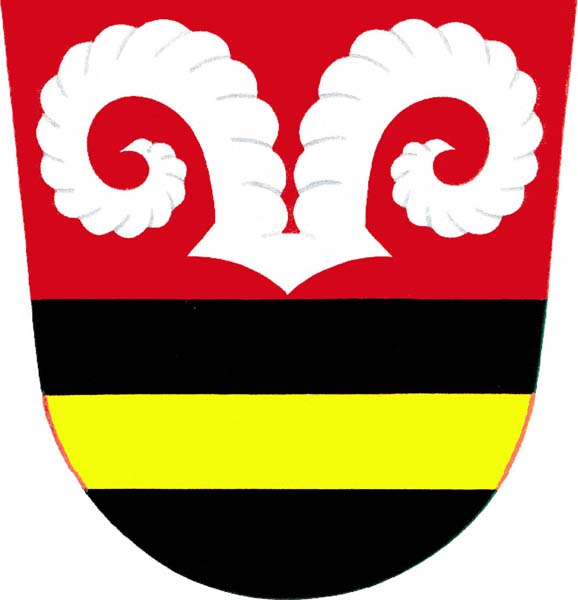
- Flag Coat of arms

- Location in the Czech Republic
- Coordinates: 49°43′25″N 13°37′23″E
- Country: Czech Republic
- Region: Plzeň
- District: Rokycany
- First mentioned: 1368

Area
  - Total: 7.71 km^{2} (2.98 sq mi)
- Elevation: 378 m (1,240 ft)

Population (2026-01-01)
  - Total: 983
  - Density: 127/km^{2} (330/sq mi)
- Time zone: UTC+1 (CET)
  - Summer (DST): UTC+2 (CEST)
- Postal codes: 337 01, 338 42
- Website: www.kamennyujezd.cz

Kamenný Újezd (German: Steinaujest) is a municipality and village in Rokycany District in the Plzeň Region of the Czech Republic. It has about 1,000 inhabitants.

== Administrative division ==
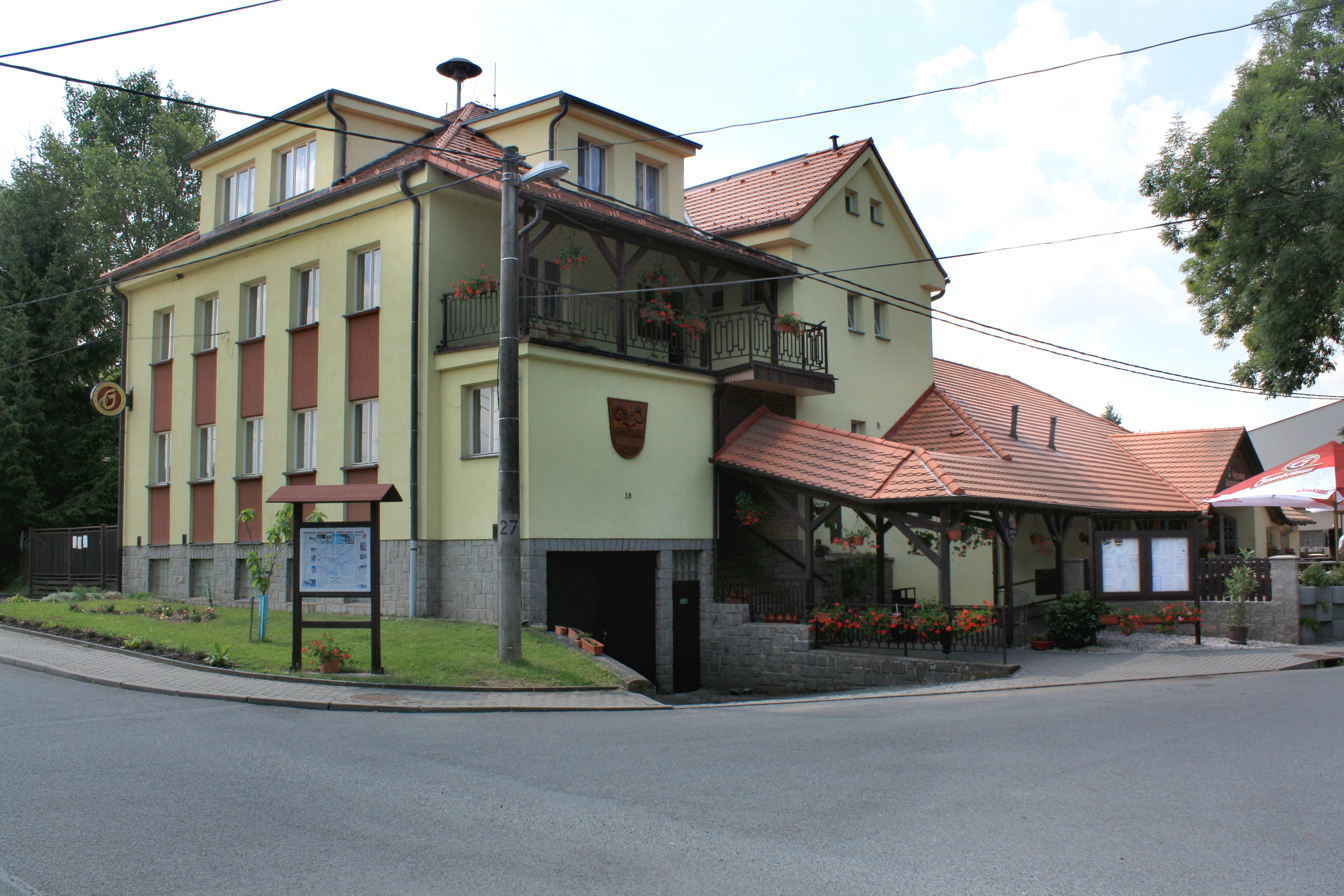
Municipal office

Kamenný Újezd consists of two municipal parts (in brackets population according to the 2021 census):

- Kamenný Újezd (746)
- Kocanda (112)

== Etymology ==
Újezd is a common Czech toponym. To distinguish from other villages called Újezd, the place began to be called Kamenný Újezd (literally 'stone Újezd') because of the stony soil in the area and its surroundings.

== Geography ==
Kamenný Újezd is located about 2 kilometres (1 mi) southeast of Rokycany and 15 km (9 mi) east of Plzeň. It lies in the Švihov Highlands. The highest point is the Kotel hill at 575 m (1,886 ft) above sea level. The Klabava River flows through the municipality. The built-up area is located in the river valley and forms a contiguous built-up area together with Rokycany and Hrádek.

== History ==
The first mention of the area of Kamenný Újezd is from 1177, when Duke Soběslav II promised this land to its soldier. The first written mention of the already existing village of Kamenný Újezd is from 1368. In 1498, King Vladislaus II confirmed that the village was part of the Rokycany estate. It remained part of Rokycany until abolition of feudal administration in 1850.

Local economy was based both on agriculture and on industry. The industry was represented by iron ore mining and wood processing from nearby forests. In the agriculture the village specialised in sheep farming, which is symbolised by ram's horns in its coat of arms.

19th and 20th century brought population increase and gradual transformation of Kamenný Újezd into semi-urban community influenced by proximity of industrial town of Rokycany. In 1868, the Rokycany–Mirošov railway opened, initially for cargo transportation only. In May 1945 both American and Soviet armies reached Kamenný Újezd during liberation of Czechoslovakia in final days of World War II.

For a short period from 1 January 1980 to 23 November 1990, the village was merged with Rokycany, but later seceded and became again an independent municipality.

== Demographics ==
Historical population

Year	Pop.	±%
1869	639	—
1880	648	+1.4%
1890	656	+1.2%
1900	647	−1.4%
1910	739	+14.2%

Year	Pop.	±%
1921	821	+11.1%
1930	740	−9.9%
1950	678	−8.4%
1961	684	+0.9%
1970	687	+0.4%

Year	Pop.	±%
1980	650	−5.4%
1991	597	−8.2%
2001	625	+4.7%
2011	687	+9.9%
2021	858	+24.9%

Source: Censuses

== Transport ==
Kamenný Újezd is located on the railway line of local importance leading from Rokycany to Příkosice.

== Sights ==
The only protected cultural monuments in the municipality are the homestead No. 8 from the second half of the 18th century and the homestead No. 12 from the first half of the 19th century.
