= Věšín =

- Municipality
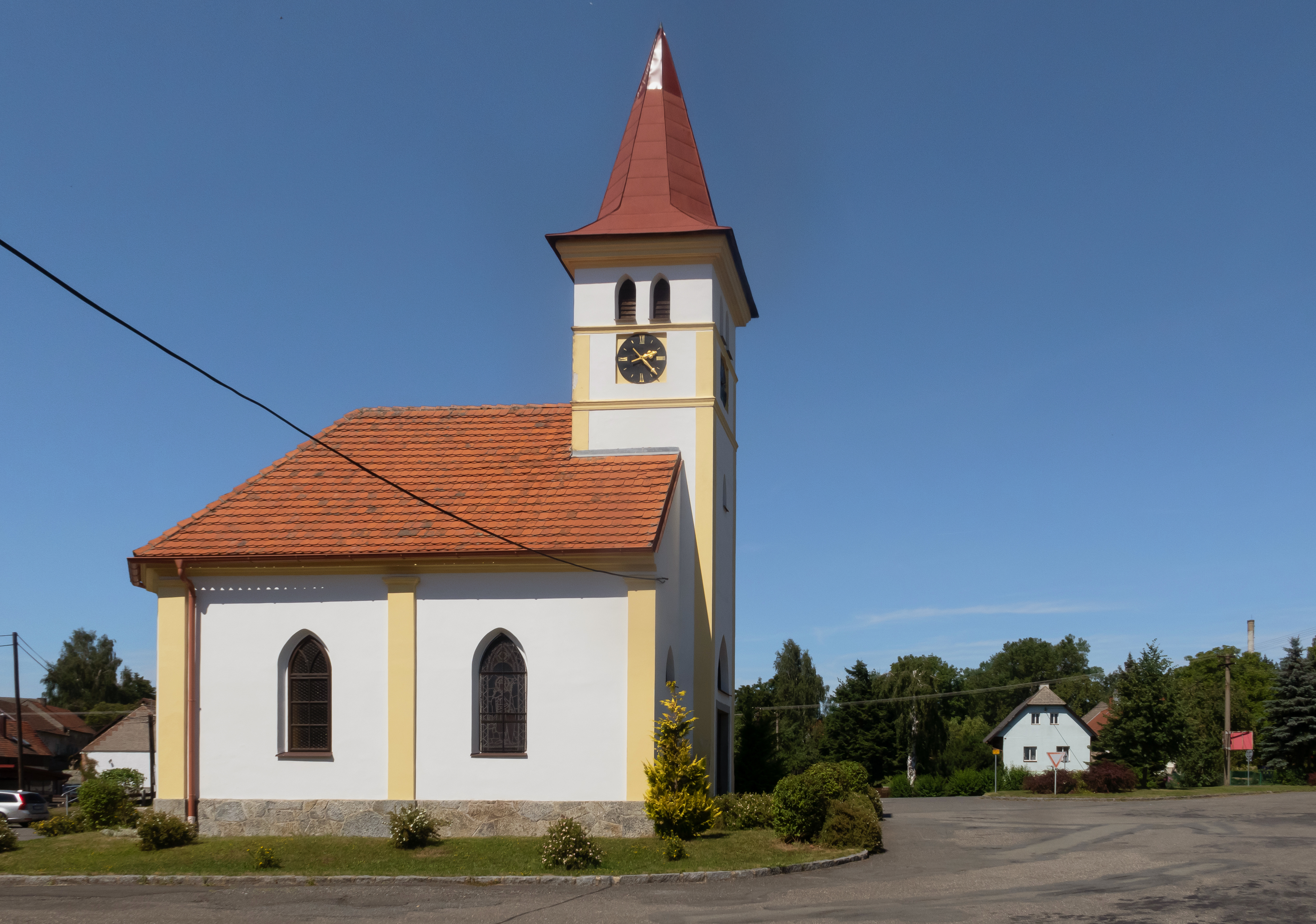
- Chapel of Saint Francis of Assisi

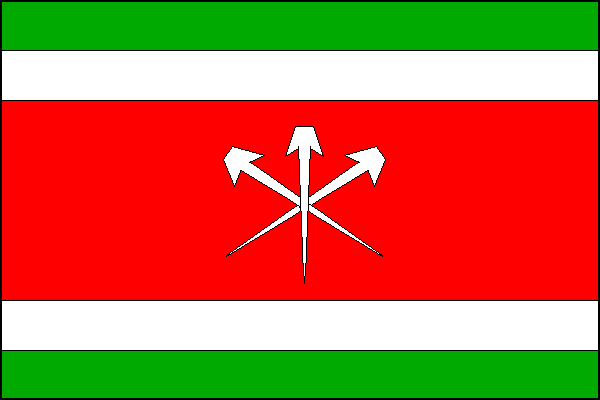
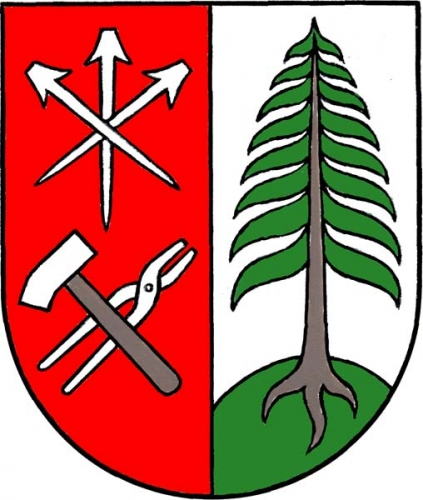
- Flag Coat of arms

- Location in the Czech Republic
- Coordinates: 49°36′55″N 13°49′27″E
- Country: Czech Republic
- Region: Central Bohemian
- District: Příbram
- First mentioned: 1349

Area
  - Total: 41.11 km^{2} (15.87 sq mi)
- Elevation: 551 m (1,808 ft)

Population (2026-01-01)
  - Total: 685
  - Density: 16.7/km^{2} (43.2/sq mi)
- Time zone: UTC+1 (CET)
  - Summer (DST): UTC+2 (CEST)
- Postal codes: 262 42, 262 43
- Website: www.vesin.cz

Věšín is a municipality and village in Příbram District in the Central Bohemian Region of the Czech Republic. It has about 700 inhabitants.

== Administrative division ==
Věšín consists of two municipal parts (in brackets population according to the 2021 census):

- Věšín (510)
- Buková (166)

== Etymology ==
The name is derived from the personal name Věška (shortened form of Vieceslav).

== Geography ==
Věšín is located about 14 kilometres (9 mi) southwest of Příbram and 63 km (39 mi) southwest of Prague. Most of the municipal territory lies in the Brdy Highlands, but the village proper lies in the Benešov Uplands. The highest point is the secondary summit of the Praha mountain at 859 m (2,818 ft) above sea level. The Klabava River originates in the woods in the northern part of the municipal territory. The Buková Brook flows through the village of Buká and supplies a set of small fishponds there.

== History ==
The first written mention of Věšín is from 1349, when it belonged to the Rožmitál estate. The village was founded in the second half of the 13th century.

== Demographics ==
Historical population

Year	Pop.	±%
1869	1,467	—
1880	1,619	+10.4%
1890	1,561	−3.6%
1900	1,488	−4.7%
1910	1,436	−3.5%

Year	Pop.	±%
1921	1,380	−3.9%
1930	1,139	−17.5%
1950	851	−25.3%
1961	908	+6.7%
1970	830	−8.6%

Year	Pop.	±%
1980	715	−13.9%
1991	657	−8.1%
2001	613	−6.7%
2011	659	+7.5%
2021	676	+2.6%

Source: Censuses

== Transport ==
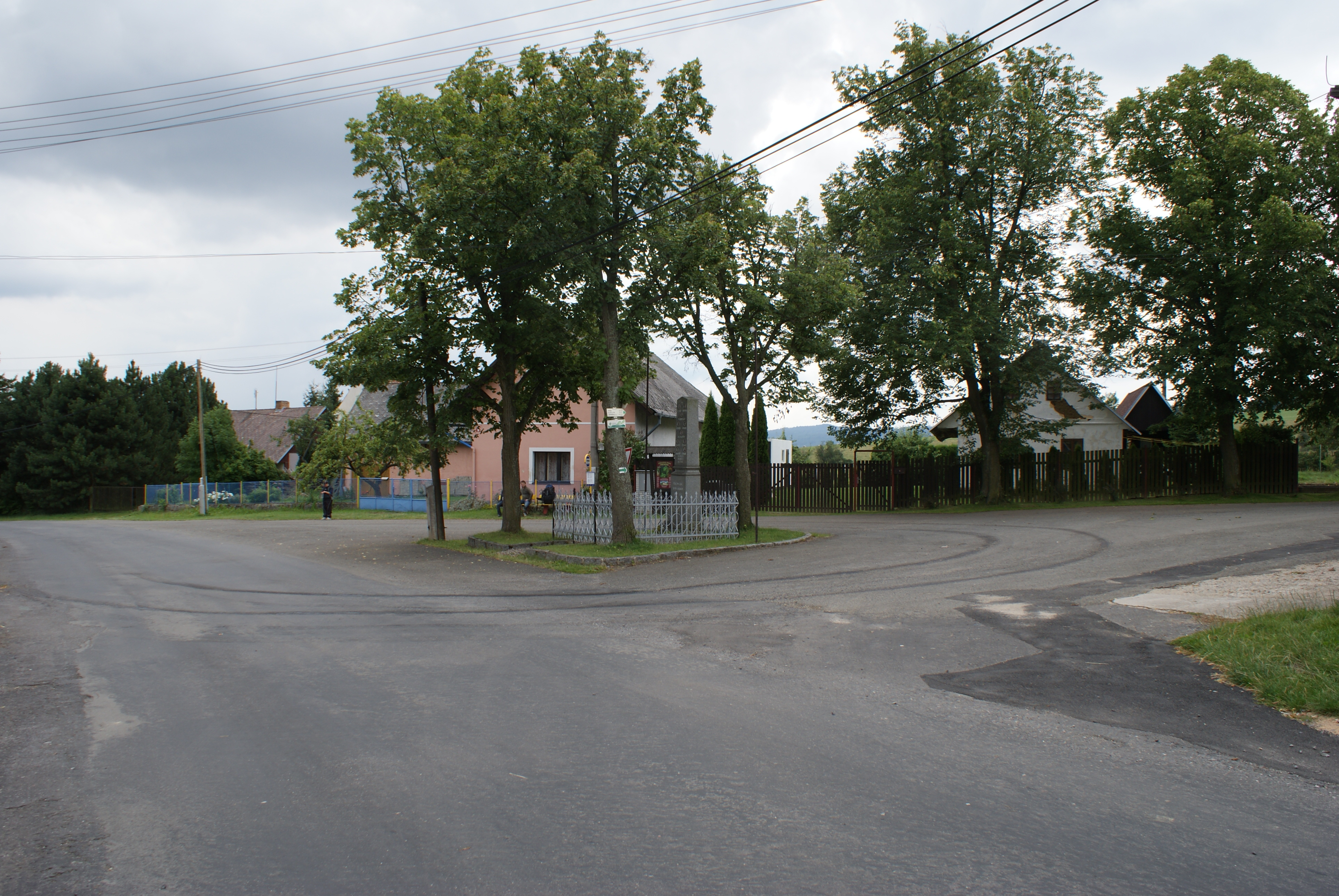
Buková, a part of Věšín

The I/19 road (the section from Plzeň to Tábor) runs through the municipality.

== Sights ==
There are no protected cultural monuments in the municipality. In the centre of Věšín is the Chapel of Saint Francis of Assisi. It was consecrated in 1905.
