= Klabava =

- Municipality
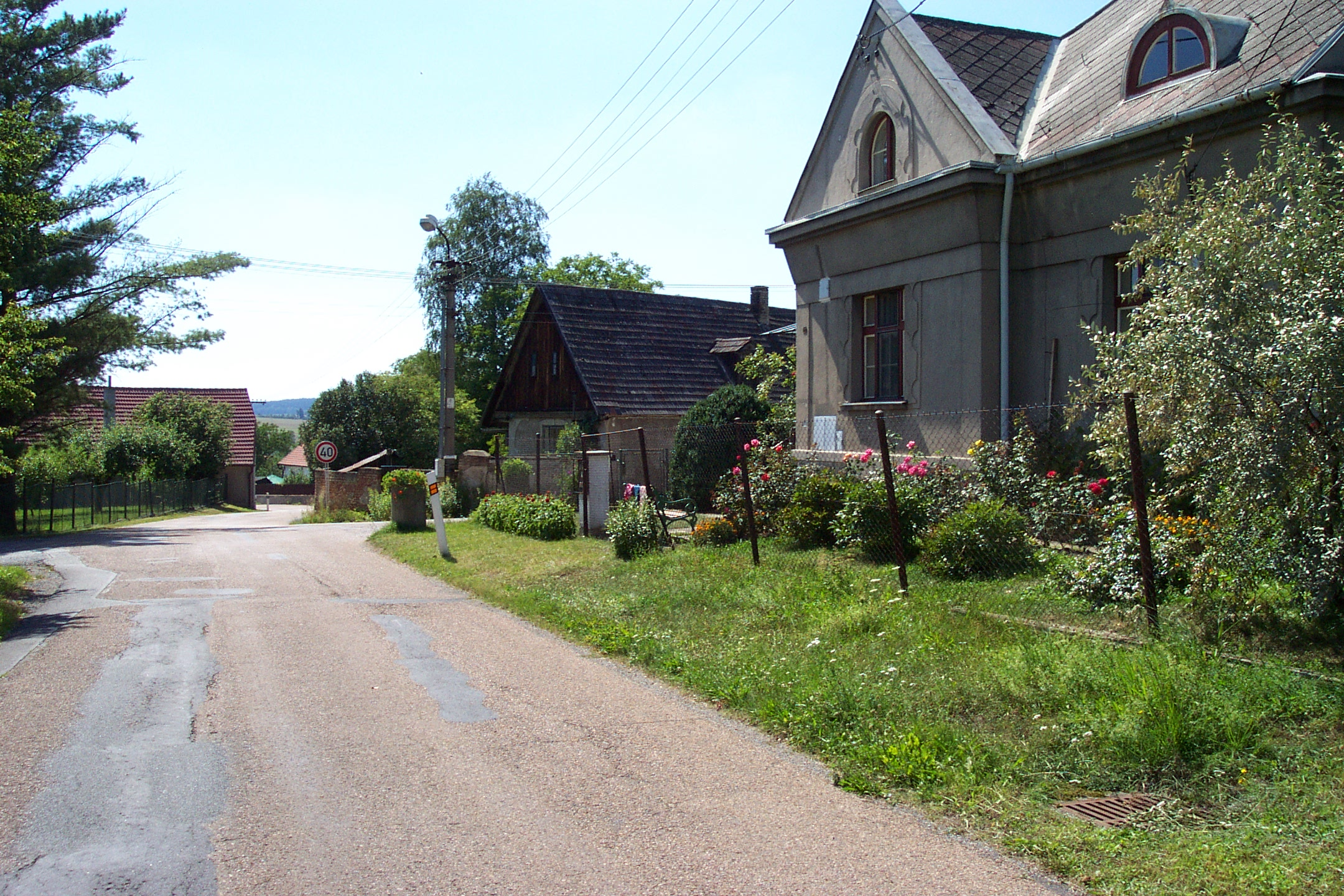
- Houses in the village

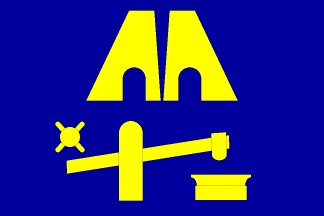
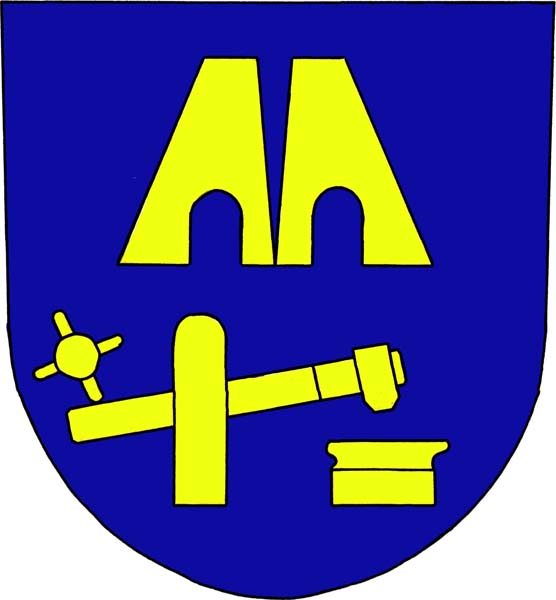
- Flag Coat of arms

- Location in the Czech Republic
- Coordinates: 49°45′13″N 13°32′22″E
- Country: Czech Republic
- Region: Plzeň
- District: Rokycany
- First mentioned: 1401

Area
  - Total: 1.50 km^{2} (0.58 sq mi)
- Elevation: 379 m (1,243 ft)

Population (2026-01-01)
  - Total: 530
  - Density: 350/km^{2} (920/sq mi)
- Time zone: UTC+1 (CET)
  - Summer (DST): UTC+2 (CEST)
- Postal code: 338 41
- Website: www.klabava.eu

Klabava is a municipality and village in Rokycany District in the Plzeň Region of the Czech Republic. It has about 500 inhabitants.

== Etymology ==
The village was named after the Klabava River.

== Geography ==
Klabava is located about 4 kilometres (2 mi) west of Rokycany and 11 km (7 mi) east of Plzeň. It lies in the Švihov Highlands. The highest point is at 413 m (1,355 ft) above sea level. The municipality is situated on the right bank of the Klabava River and on the shore of the Klabava Reservoir, built on the river. However, the reservoir is located completely outside the municipal territory.

== History ==
The document relating Klabava to the year 1368 is a forgery from the 15th century. The first trustworthy written mention of Klabava is in a deed of King Wenceslaus IV from 1401, when the village was owned by the monastery in Rokycany. From the 17th century until 1926, iron ore was mined near Klabava and there was an ironworks in the village.

== Demographics ==
Historical population

Year	Pop.	±%
1869	666	—
1880	798	+19.8%
1890	686	−14.0%
1900	675	−1.6%
1910	671	−0.6%

Year	Pop.	±%
1921	641	−4.5%
1930	642	+0.2%
1950	562	−12.5%
1961	550	−2.1%
1970	517	−6.0%

Year	Pop.	±%
1980	430	−16.8%
1991	395	−8.1%
2001	379	−4.1%
2011	437	+15.3%
2021	473	+8.2%

Source: Censuses

== Transport ==
Klabava has a station on the regional railway line Plzeň–Beroun. However, this station is located just beyond the municipal border.

== Sights ==
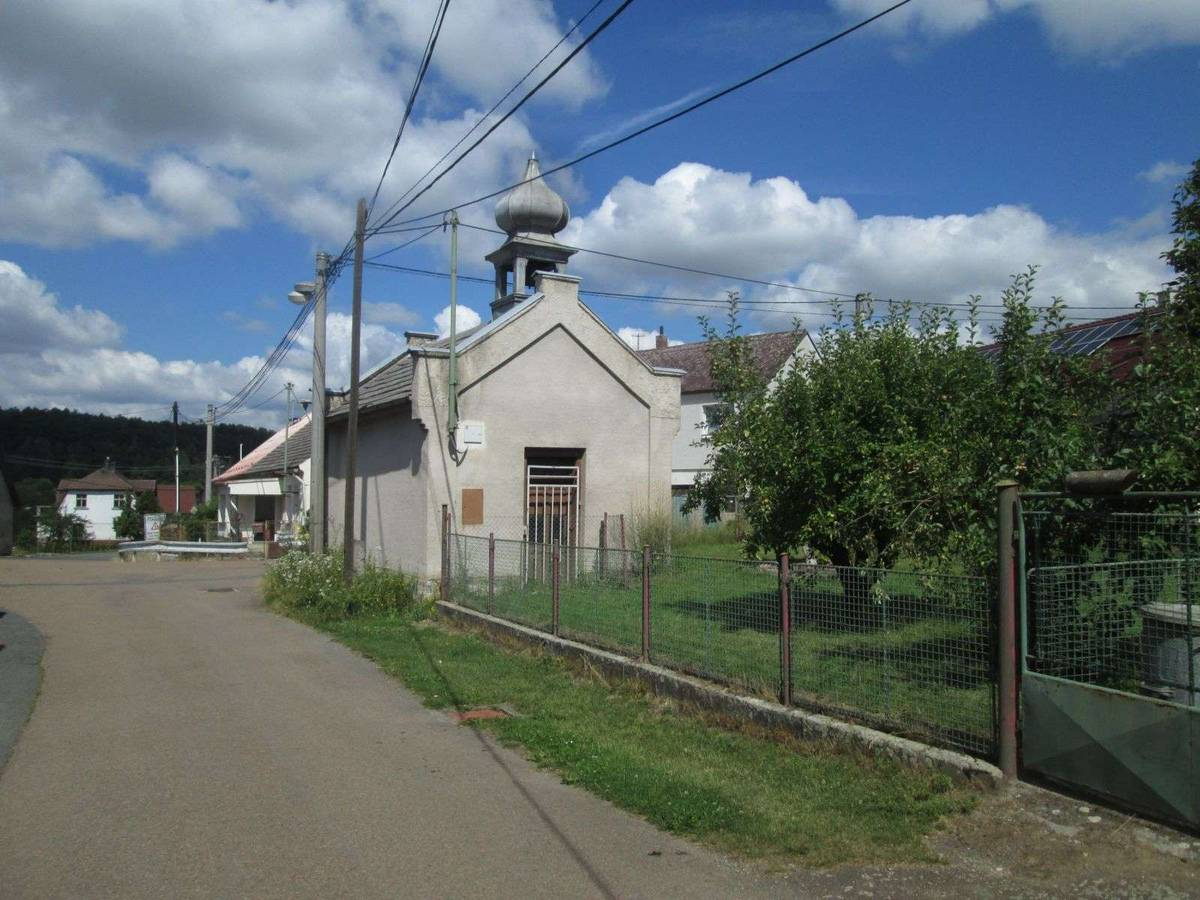
Chapel

There are no protected cultural monuments in the municipality. A landmark is the chapel in the centre of Klabava.

== Paleontology ==
Klabava gave its name to a geological formation from the Ordovician period.
