= Hammer Mill at Dobřív =

Building in the Czech Republic

- Vodní hamr Dobřív
- Dobřív, Plzeň Region in the Czech Republic
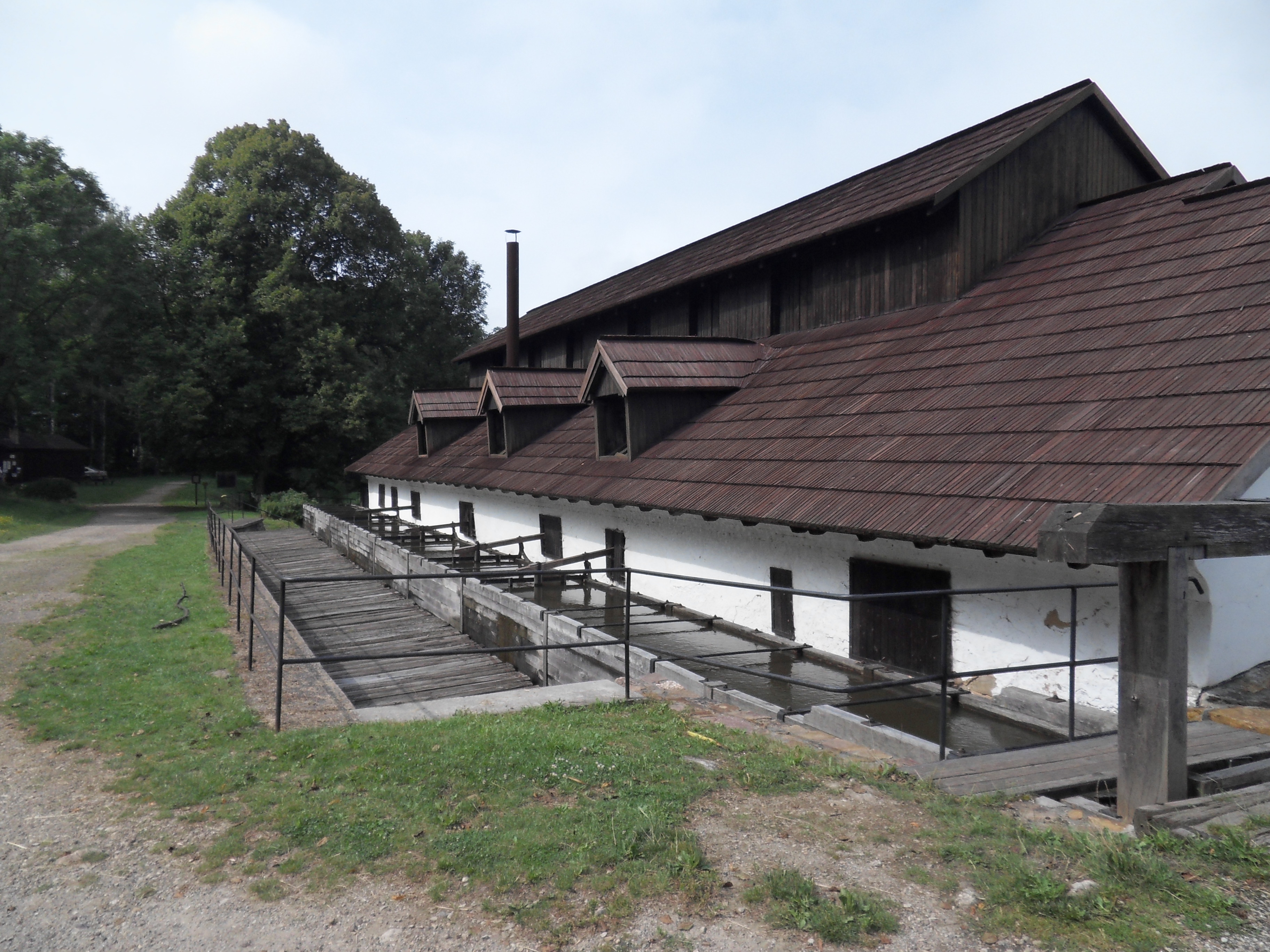
- Water Hammer Mill at Dobřív

Site information
- Type: Mill
- Owner: Plzeň Region
- Open to the public: Yes
- Website: Official website

Location
- Coordinates: 49°43′10″N 13°41′31″E

Site history
- Built: 1825

The water Hammer Mill (also Upper Hammer Mill, in Czech also Hořejší lub) at Dobřív near Rokycany is a unique technical monument commemorating the 500-year-old tradition of iron processing in this region of the Czech Republic. Within the Czech Republic, it is considered the most important building of its kind. It is the first technical monument in the Plzeň Region, that was declared a national cultural monument in 2010.

The monument is owned by Plzeň Region and administered by the Museum of West Bohemia in Plzeň.

== History ==
The present brick building was constructed at the beginning of the 19th century in the place of older wooden hammer mills from 1658 and 1701. The rich machinery is dated back to the 19th century. Originally, the hammer mill was used to refine blast-furnace raw iron and to produce bar forgings. After the development of later steel industry technologies, the hammer mill changed over to production of heavy forged tools in the late 1860s. In the second half of the 20th century, the production was stopped in the hammer mill and in the ironworks beneath it. The hammer mill became a museum exposition to document the old ways of industrial production

== Description ==
The hammer stands close to the dam of Huťský pond. The adjacent drive feeds water through a wooden trough to the water wheels that drive the hammering equipment through the transmission system. Originally the iron-mill had five water wheels, today three are functional.

The mill hall dimensions are 32×12 meters. In the interior there are forges, hammers of various sizes, grinding machines, bending machine, drills, presses and various tools. Water wheels power not only the equipment for the production of forged tools, but also the electricity generator. Each water wheel has an output of about 8 kW.

== Present ==
When visiting the exposition it is possible to see how the mill works. While the fire in the forge is burning, and the wheels are spinning the museum guide, a blacksmith, operates a small tail hammer and on the anvil will forge a nail with a rounded head for the visitor, the same, which is custom-made for historic buildings today. Curious visitors interested in forging can learn a blacksmith's craft in a course, where they will learn to forge under a small iron-mill.

=== Reconstruction ===
In 2011 the iron-mill completed a major repair of the water drive at cost of 11 million CZK. Aged deposits of mud caused the water to stand in the drive and the technical equipment of the hammer mill was out of order. Therefore, it was necessary to completely mud about 900 meters long drive and solidify the banks.

In 2017 the West Bohemian Museum in Plzeň has received financial support (10 millions CZK) from the Integrated Regional Development Fund for the national monument revitalization. The project, scheduled for 2018-19, will restore the technical equipment, some dating from the 19th century. The permanent exposition on the history of the iron-mill, but also on the history of mining and processing of iron ore in the Brdy region will be expanded as well. Both activities date back to the 14th century, when the Rosenberg family founded the first smelters here.

== Recognition ==
The hammer mill is a technical example of this type with full equipment proving the original handicraft production commemorating the 500-year tradition of metallurgy in the Brdy region. It was declared a cultural monument in 1958 and a national cultural monument in 2010. It has been part of the Dobřív village monument zone since 1995.

In 2010 the Czech National Bank issued a 2500 CZK commemorative gold coin as part of the Industrial Heritage Sites series. The coin was designed by Jaroslav Veselák.
