= Vlkov (Žďár nad Sázavou District) =

- Municipality
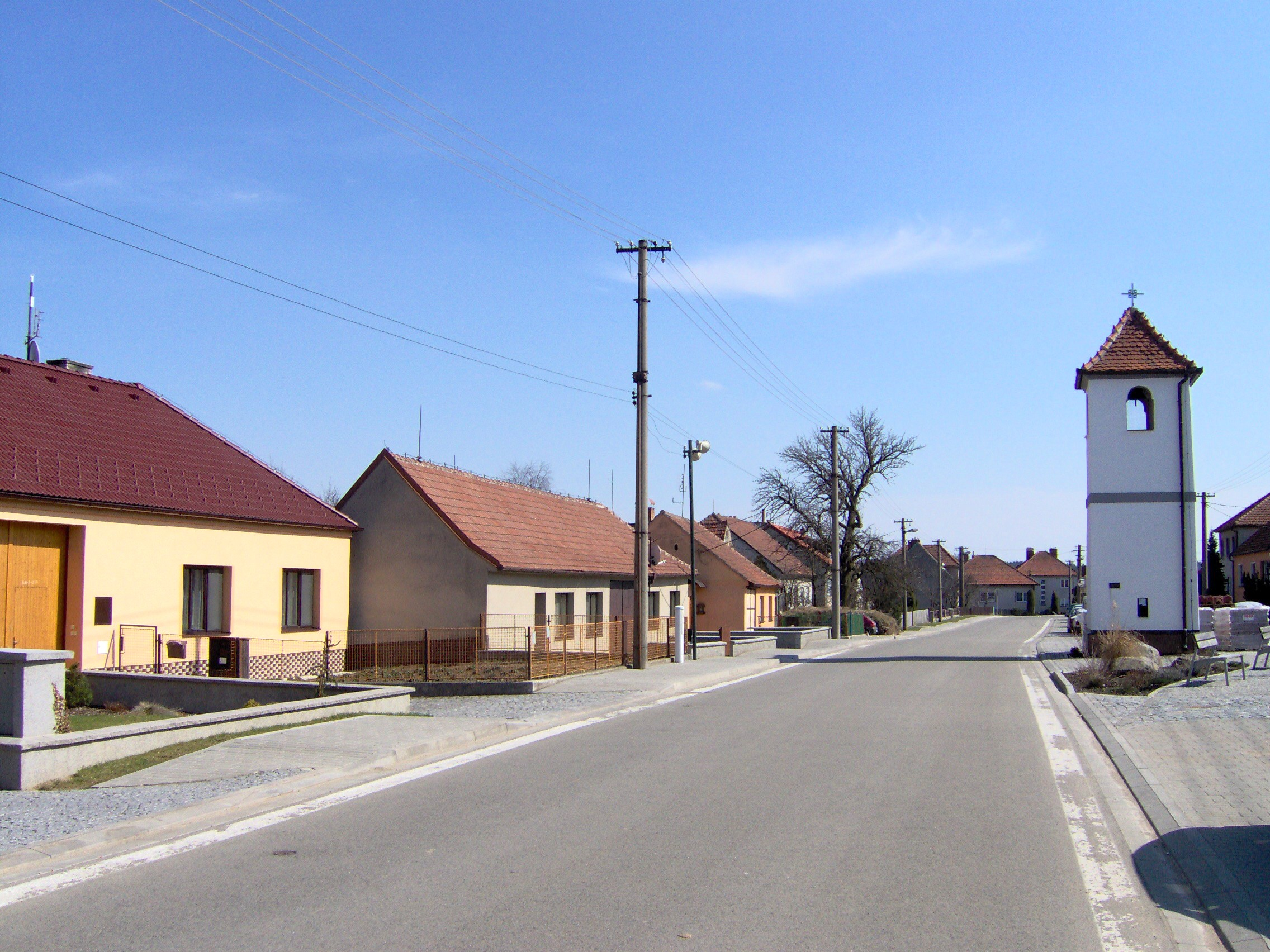
- Centre of Vlkov with a belfry

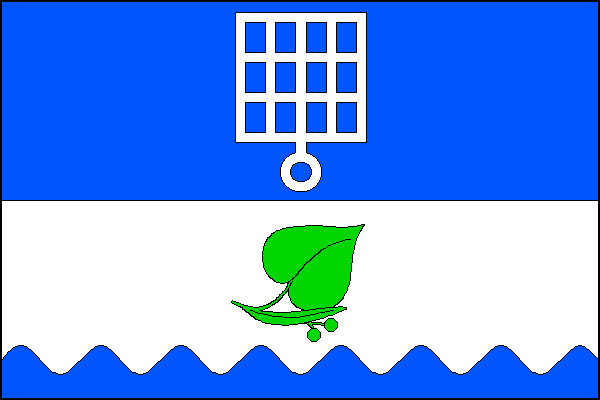
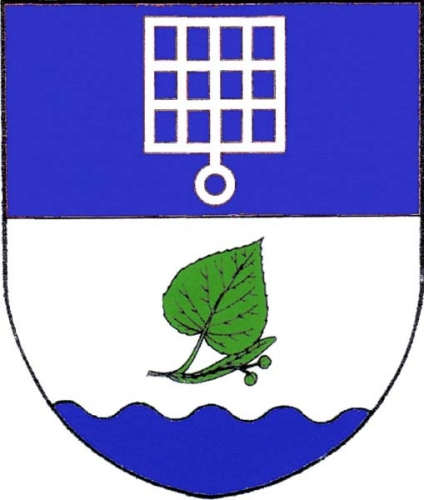
- Flag Coat of arms

- Location in the Czech Republic
- Coordinates: 49°19′28″N 16°12′1″E
- Country: Czech Republic
- Region: Vysočina
- District: Žďár nad Sázavou
- First mentioned: 1364

Area
  - Total: 5.70 km^{2} (2.20 sq mi)
- Elevation: 503 m (1,650 ft)

Population (2026-01-01)
  - Total: 280
  - Density: 49/km^{2} (130/sq mi)
- Time zone: UTC+1 (CET)
  - Summer (DST): UTC+2 (CEST)
- Postal code: 594 53
- Website: www.vlkov.cz

Vlkov is a municipality and village in Žďár nad Sázavou District in the Vysočina Region of the Czech Republic. It has about 300 inhabitants.

Vlkov lies approximately 33 kilometres (21 mi) south-east of Žďár nad Sázavou, 46 km (29 mi) east of Jihlava, and 154 km (96 mi) south-east of Prague.

== Demographics ==
Historical population
Year	Pop.	±%
1869	374	—
1880	393	+5.1%
1890	408	+3.8%
1900	410	+0.5%
1910	370	−9.8%
1921	343	−7.3%
1930	335	−2.3%
1950	342	+2.1%
1961	356	+4.1%
1970	340	−4.5%
1980	288	−15.3%
1991	268	−6.9%
2001	240	−10.4%
2011	251	+4.6%
2021	273	+8.8%
Source: Censuses
