= Spálené Poříčí =

- Town
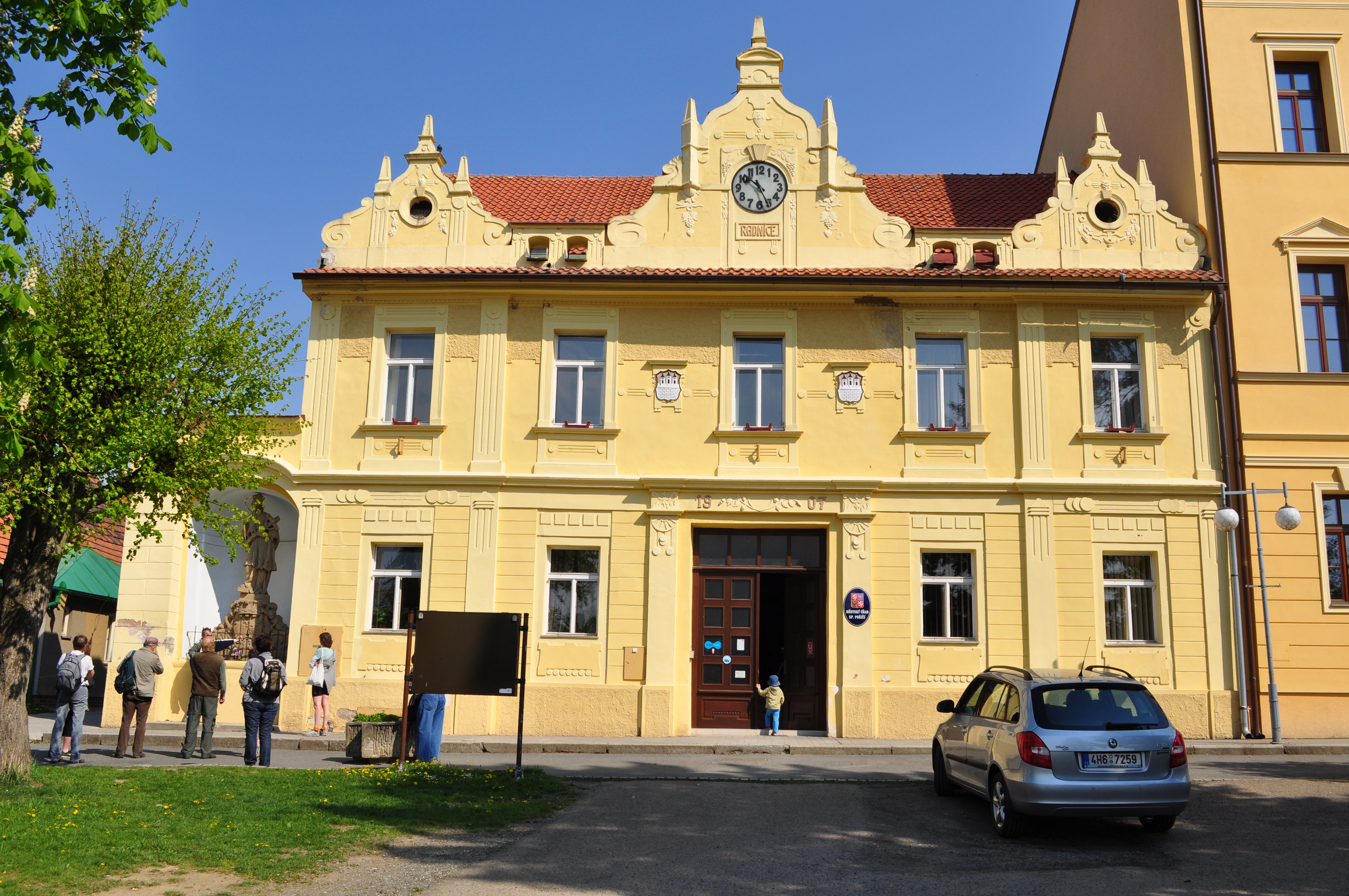
- Town hall

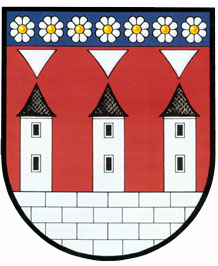
- Flag Coat of arms

- Location in the Czech Republic
- Coordinates: 49°36′51″N 13°36′20″E
- Country: Czech Republic
- Region: Plzeň
- District: Plzeň-South
- First mentioned: 1239

Government
  - Mayor: Jindřich Jindřich

Area
  - Total: 57.82 km^{2} (22.32 sq mi)
- Elevation: 417 m (1,368 ft)

Population (2026-01-01)
  - Total: 3,034
  - Density: 52.47/km^{2} (135.9/sq mi)
- Time zone: UTC+1 (CET)
  - Summer (DST): UTC+2 (CEST)
- Postal codes: 335 61, 335 62
- Website: www.spaleneporici.cz

Spálené Poříčí (Czech pronunciation: [ˈspaːlɛnɛː ˈpor̝iːtʃiː]; German: Brennporitschen) is a town in Plzeň-South District in the Plzeň Region of the Czech Republic. It has about 3,000 inhabitants. The historic town centre is well preserved and is protected as an urban monument zone.

== Administrative division ==
Spálené Poříčí consists of 11 municipal parts (in brackets population according to the 2021 census):

- Spálené Poříčí (1,685)
- Číčov (200)
- Hořehledy (196)
- Hořice (8)
- Karlov (8)
- Lipnice (345)
- Lučiště (118)
- Struhaře (66)
- Těnovice (113)
- Vlkov (36)
- Záluží (20)

== Etymology ==
The name Poříčí means 'riverbed' in Czech. In the 17th century, the adjective spálené (i.e. 'burnt') was added to the name because of many large fires that damaged the town.

== Geography ==
Spálené Poříčí is located about 19 kilometres (12 mi) southeast of Plzeň. It lies mostly in the Švihov Highlands. The eastern part of the municipal territory extends into the Brdy Highlands and includes the highest point of Spálené Poříčí, the hill Trokavecká skála at 706 m (2,316 ft) above sea level. The Bradava Stream flows through the town. There are several fishponds around the town, the largest of which are Hvížďalka and Vlkovský rybník.

== History ==
The first written mention of Poříčí is from 1239. It was then a market village, sold to the monastery in Kladruby. In 1360 at least, the village was purchased by Bohuslav of Schwamberg. They turned the village into a market town with a church and probably a fortress, but in 1391 Poříčí was sold again. Then the owners often changed. In the 16th century, Poříčí was promoted to a town.

In 1603, the estate was acquired by the Wratislaw of Mitrovice family. Adam the Elder Wratislaw of Mitrovice had the fortress rebuilt into a Renaissance castle in 1617. In 1620, during the Thirty Years' War, Poříčí was burned down by the army of Charles Bonaventure Bucquoy. The town then again suffered from the passage of the army in 1645 and began to be called Spálené Poříčí. After the war, Jews were invited into the town to raise its economy.

In 1749, the Metropolitan Chapter at Saint Vitus in Prague bought Spálené Poříčí. The town remained in its possession until modern times, and the chapter still owns the castle today.

== Demographics ==
Historical population

Year	Pop.	±%
1869	4,474	—
1880	4,667	+4.3%
1890	4,380	−6.1%
1900	4,225	−3.5%
1910	4,200	−0.6%

Year	Pop.	±%
1921	4,109	−2.2%
1930	3,925	−4.5%
1950	3,203	−18.4%
1961	3,191	−0.4%
1970	2,811	−11.9%

Year	Pop.	±%
1980	2,817	+0.2%
1991	2,584	−8.3%
2001	2,512	−2.8%
2011	2,660	+5.9%
2021	2,795	+5.1%

Source: Censuses

== Transport ==
The I/19 road (the section from Plzeň to Tábor) runs through the town.

The village of Lipnice is located on the railway line Nezvěstice–Příkosice.

== Sights ==
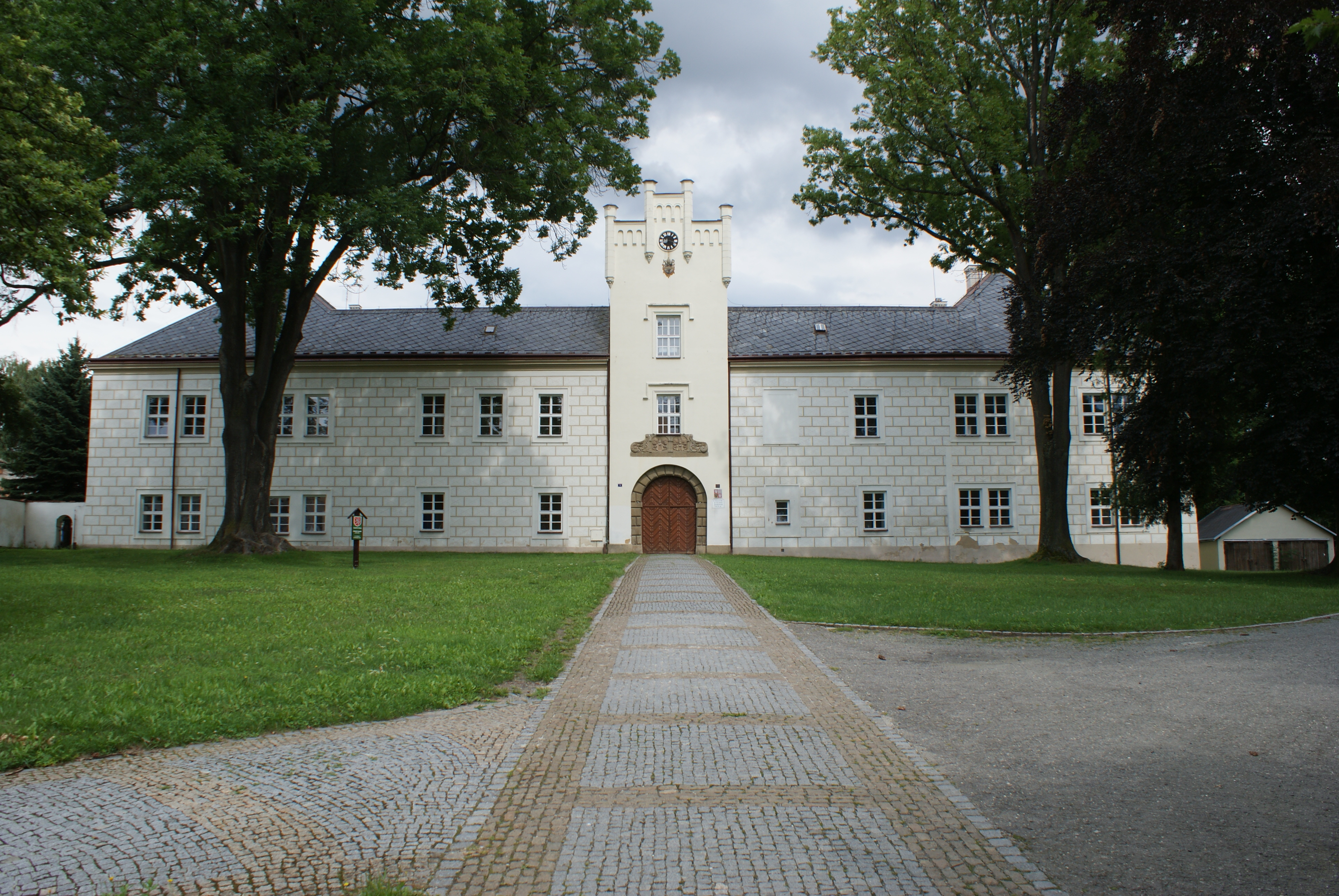
Spálené Poříčí Castle

The Spálené Poříčí Castle replaced the original Gothic fortress in 1617. The Renaissance sgraffito decoration of the courtyard and two unique sandstone portals have been preserved. The castle is partly open to the public.

The Church of Saint Nicholas was originally built in the 14th century. It was rebuilt several times, its current look is from 1882.

== Notable people ==
- Gabriela Šlajsová (born 2000), footballer

== Twin towns – sister cities ==
Spálené Poříčí is twinned with:

- Ralbitz-Rosenthal, Germany
