= Dobřeň =

- Municipality
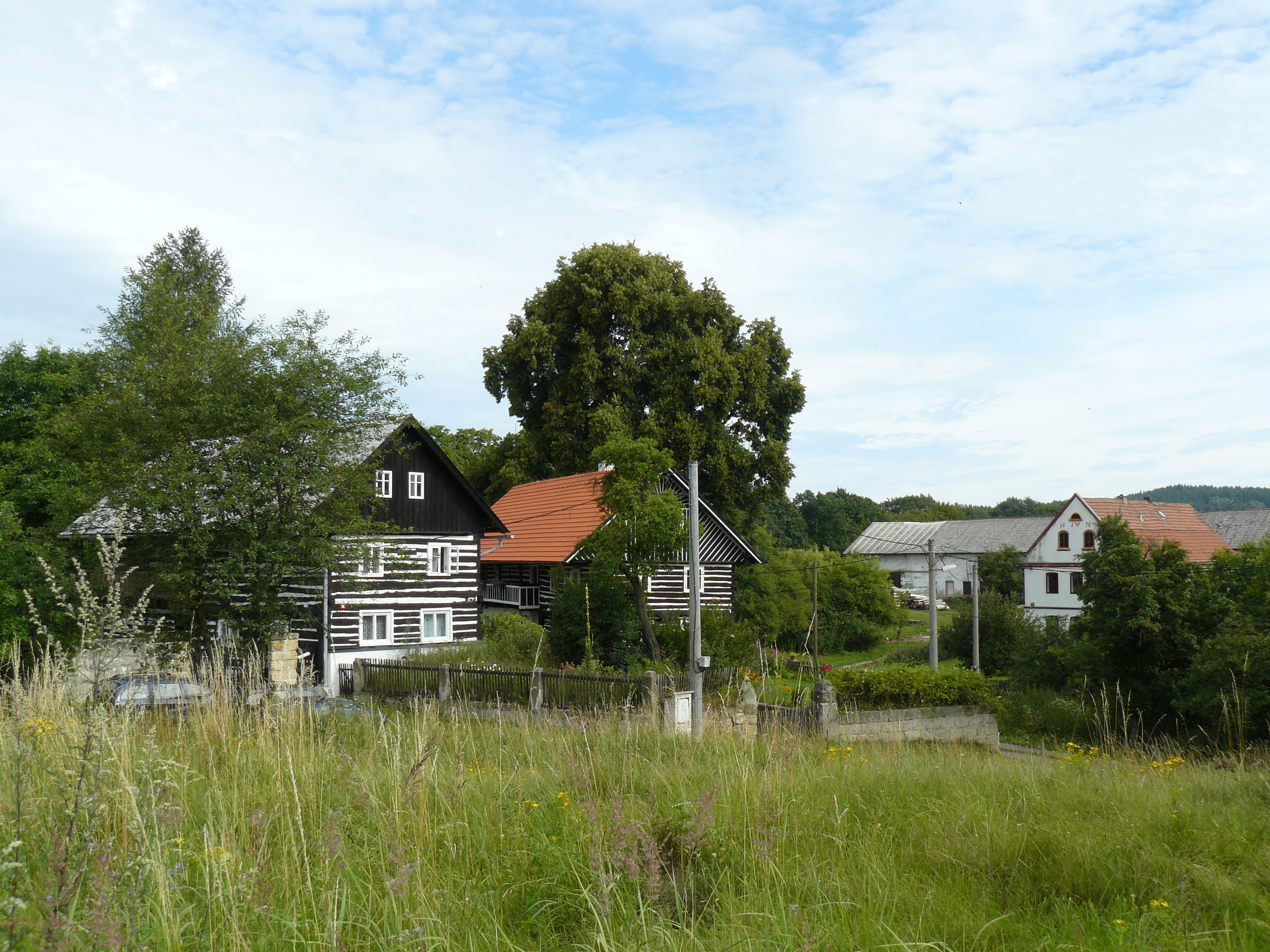
- Folk architecture in Dobřeň

- Location in the Czech Republic
- Coordinates: 50°28′46″N 14°33′24″E
- Country: Czech Republic
- Region: Central Bohemian
- District: Mělník
- First mentioned: 1402

Area
  - Total: 20.56 km^{2} (7.94 sq mi)
- Elevation: 330 m (1,080 ft)

Population (2026-01-01)
  - Total: 164
  - Density: 7.98/km^{2} (20.7/sq mi)
- Time zone: UTC+1 (CET)
  - Summer (DST): UTC+2 (CEST)
- Postal codes: 277 21, 277 23, 277 35
- Website: www.obecdobren.cz

Dobřeň is a municipality and village in Mělník District in the Central Bohemian Region of the Czech Republic. It has about 200 inhabitants. The municipality is known for many well-preserved examples of vernacular architecture.

== Administrative division ==
Dobřeň consists of five municipal parts (in brackets population according to the 2021 census):

- Dobřeň (39)
- Jestřebice (92)
- Klučno (0)
- Střezivojice (45)
- Vlkov (5)

== Etymology ==
The name Dobřeň is derived from the personal name Dobřen, meaning "Dobřen's (court)".

== Geography ==
Dobřeň is located about 15 kilometres (9 mi) north of Mělník and 40 km (25 mi) north of Prague. It lies in a hilly and densely forested landscape of the Ralsko Uplands. The highest point is the hill Supí hora at 434 m (1,424 ft) above sea level. The Pšovka River flows along the southern municipal border. The entire municipal territory lies in the Kokořínsko – Máchův kraj Protected Landscape Area.

== History ==
The first written mention of Dobřeň is from 1402.

== Demographics ==
Historical population

Year	Pop.	±%
1869	1,057	—
1880	1,007	−4.7%
1890	928	−7.8%
1900	836	−9.9%
1910	744	−11.0%

Year	Pop.	±%
1921	756	+1.6%
1930	708	−6.3%
1950	302	−57.3%
1961	264	−12.6%
1970	239	−9.5%

Year	Pop.	±%
1980	192	−19.7%
1991	156	−18.8%
2001	150	−3.8%
2011	195	+30.0%
2021	181	−7.2%

Source: Censuses

== Transport ==
There are no railways or major roads passing through the municipality.

== Sights ==
The municipality is full of well-preserved examples of vernacular village architecture, typical for this region. The village of Dobřeň was declared a village monument reservation, and Jestřebice and Střezivojice were declared village monument zones. Dobřeň is valuable for an important set of folk architecture wooden houses from the 18th and 19th centuries. In Jestřebice are many half-timbered estates with multi-storey houses with galleries. Střezivojice consists of agricultural homesteads and smaller cottages.
