= Čakov (Benešov District) =

- Municipality
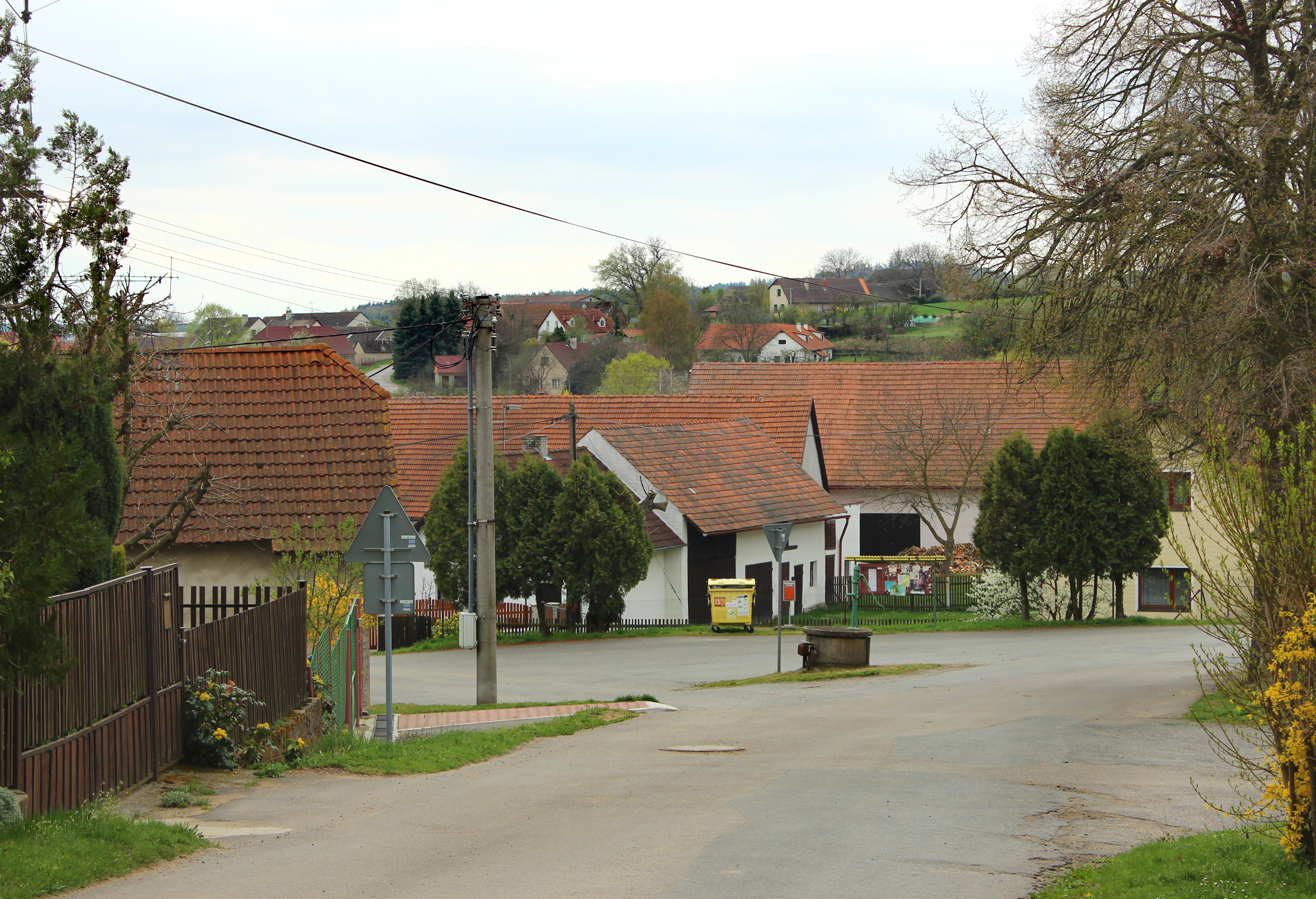
- Centre of Čakov

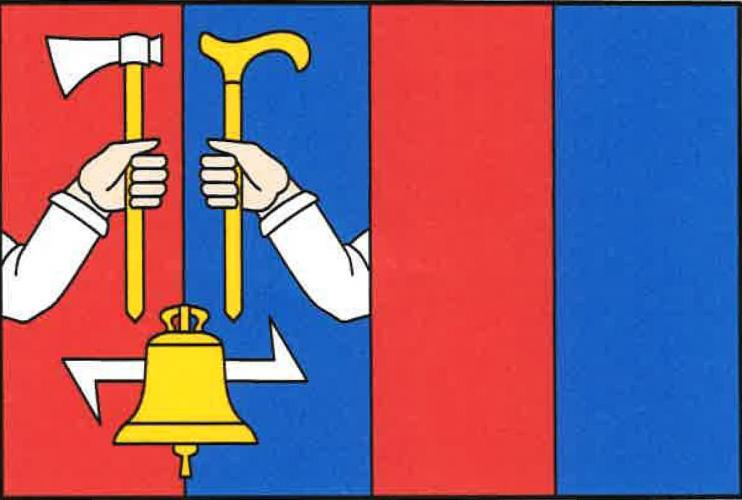
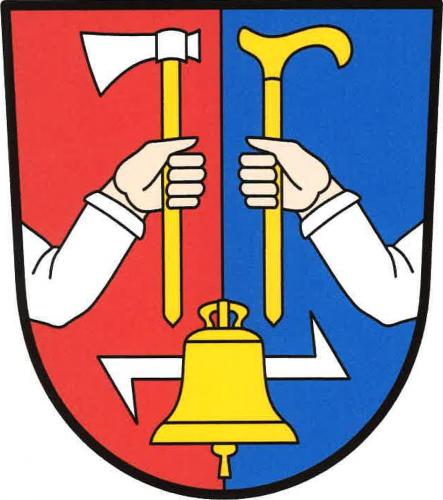
- Flag Coat of arms

- Location in the Czech Republic
- Coordinates: 49°49′32″N 14°50′11″E
- Country: Czech Republic
- Region: Central Bohemian
- District: Benešov
- First mentioned: 1226

Area
  - Total: 5.29 km^{2} (2.04 sq mi)
- Elevation: 454 m (1,490 ft)

Population (2026-01-01)
  - Total: 135
  - Density: 25.5/km^{2} (66.1/sq mi)
- Time zone: UTC+1 (CET)
  - Summer (DST): UTC+2 (CEST)
- Postal code: 257 24
- Website: chopos.cz/obce/cakov

Čakov is a municipality and village in Benešov District in the Central Bohemian Region of the Czech Republic. It has about 100 inhabitants.

== Administrative division ==
Čakov consists of three municipal parts (in brackets population according to the 2021 census):

- Čakov (70)
- Tatouňovice (31)
- Vlkov (28)

== Etymology ==
The name Čakov is derived from the surname Čak, meaning "Čak's (court)".

== Geography ==
Čakov is located about 11 kilometres (7 mi) northeast of Benešov and 34 km (21 mi) southeast of Prague. It lies in the Benešov Uplands. The highest point is a nameless hill at 535 m (1,755 ft) above sea level.

== History ==
The first written mention of Čakov is from 1226. For centuries, it belonged to the Ostředek estate and was only a small hamlet with 5–6 families.

== Demographics ==
Historical population

Year	Pop.	±%
1869	307	—
1880	337	+9.8%
1890	311	−7.7%
1900	274	−11.9%
1910	277	+1.1%

Year	Pop.	±%
1921	260	−6.1%
1930	243	−6.5%
1950	177	−27.2%
1961	171	−3.4%
1970	137	−19.9%

Year	Pop.	±%
1980	109	−20.4%
1991	112	+2.8%
2001	109	−2.7%
2011	121	+11.0%
2021	129	+6.6%

Source: Censuses

== Transport ==
There are no railways or major roads passing through the municipality. The D1 motorway from Prague to Brno runs north of Čakov just outside the municipality.

== Sights ==
There are no protected cultural monuments in the municipality.
