= Děkov =

- Municipality
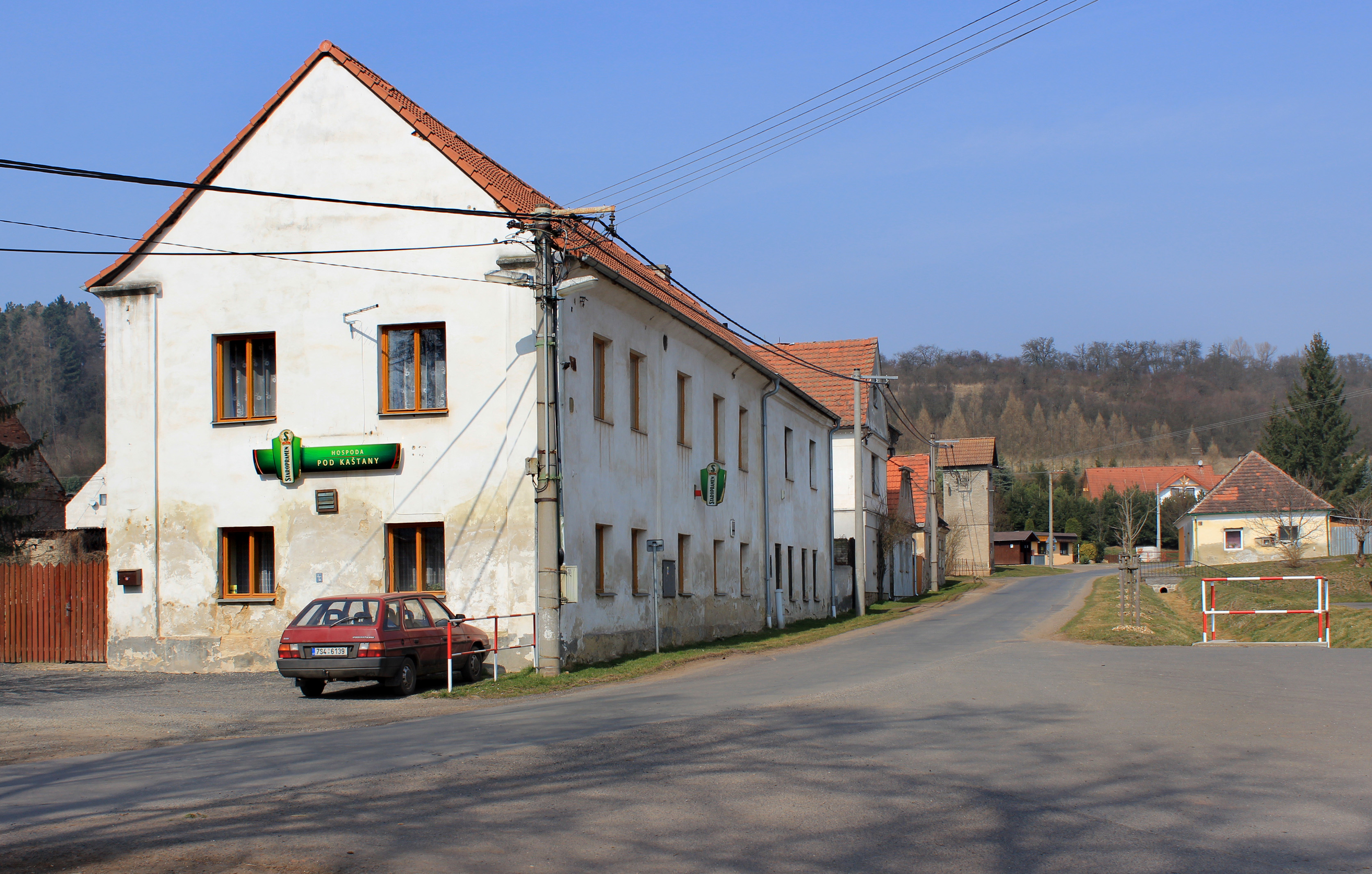
- Restaurant by the main road

- Location in the Czech Republic
- Coordinates: 50°10′17″N 13°33′16″E
- Country: Czech Republic
- Region: Central Bohemian
- District: Rakovník
- First mentioned: 1325

Area
  - Total: 9.05 km^{2} (3.49 sq mi)
- Elevation: 372 m (1,220 ft)

Population (2026-01-01)
  - Total: 247
  - Density: 27.3/km^{2} (70.7/sq mi)
- Time zone: UTC+1 (CET)
  - Summer (DST): UTC+2 (CEST)
- Postal code: 270 04
- Website: www.obec-dekov.cz

Děkov is a municipality and village in Rakovník District in the Central Bohemian Region of the Czech Republic. It has about 200 inhabitants.

== Administrative division ==
Děkov consists of three municipal parts (in brackets population according to the 2021 census):

- Děkov (93)
- Nová Ves (42)
- Vlkov (77)

== Etymology ==
The name is derived from the personal name Děk or Děka, meaning "Děk's/Děka's (court)".

== Geography ==
Děkov is located about 14 kilometres (9 mi) northwest of Rakovník and 57 km (35 mi) west of Prague. It lies in the Rakovník Uplands. The highest point is the flat hill Novoveský vrch at 440 m (1,444 ft) above sea level.

== History ==
The first written mention of Děkov is from 1325.

== Demographics ==
Historical population

Year	Pop.	±%
1869	784	—
1880	817	+4.2%
1890	859	+5.1%
1900	883	+2.8%
1910	898	+1.7%

Year	Pop.	±%
1921	822	−8.5%
1930	847	+3.0%
1950	302	−64.3%
1961	301	−0.3%
1970	265	−12.0%

Year	Pop.	±%
1980	207	−21.9%
1991	173	−16.4%
2001	184	+6.4%
2011	196	+6.5%
2021	212	+8.2%

Source: Censuses

== Transport ==
There are no railways or major roads passing through the municipality.

== Sights ==
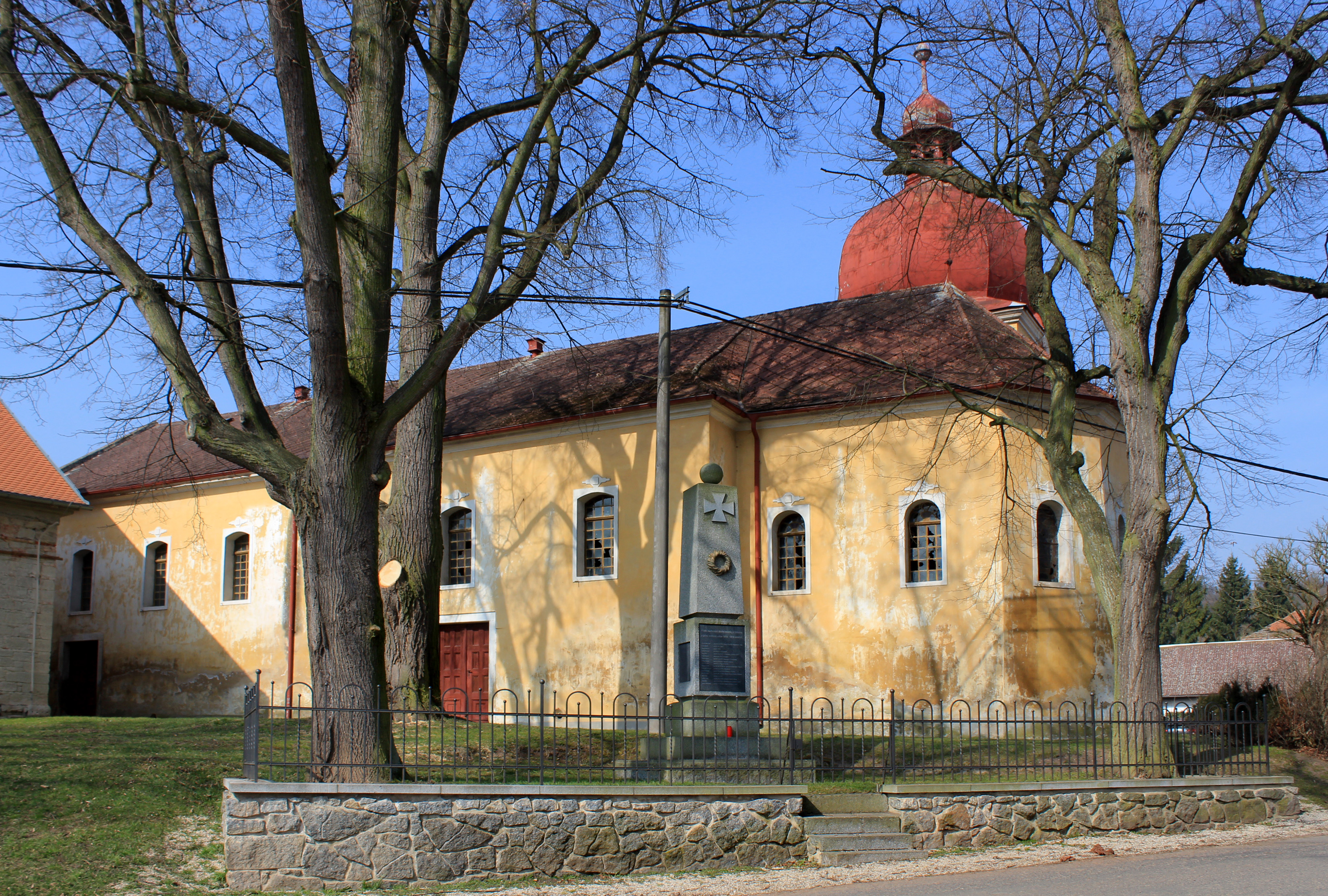
Church of Saint John the Baptist

The main landmark of Děkov is the Church of Saint John the Baptist. It was first mentioned in 1361. In 1664, it was replaced by the current early Baroque building. The church was rebuilt in 1729 and extended in 1868.
