= Příkosice =

- Municipality
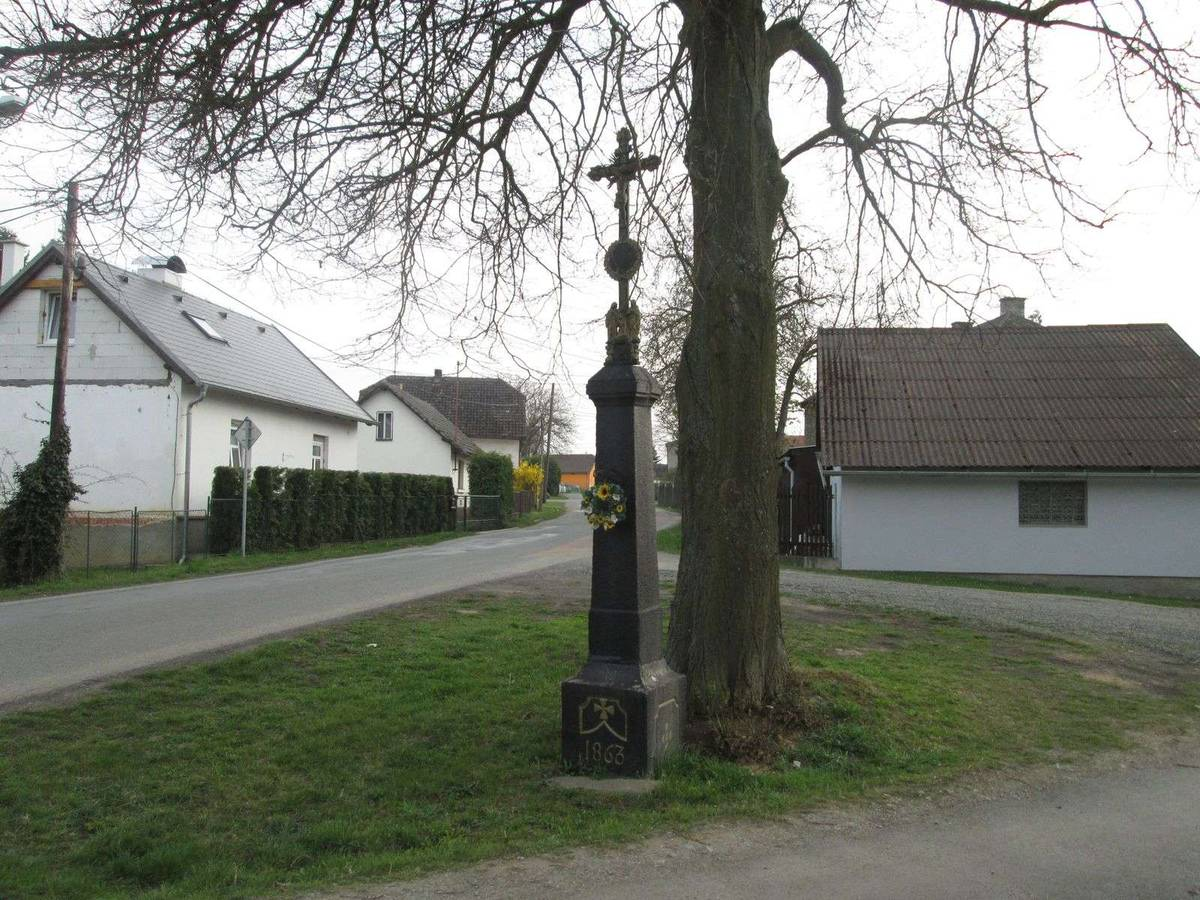
- Memorial cross

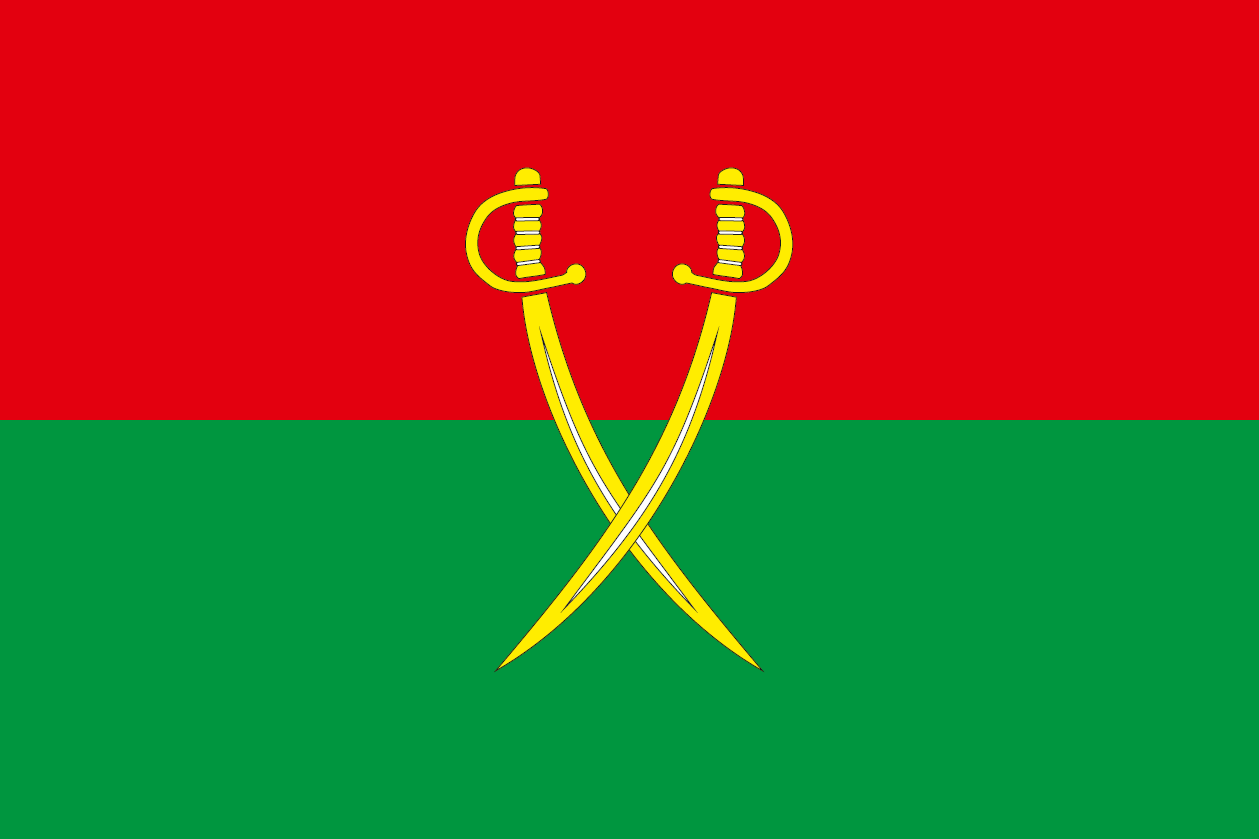
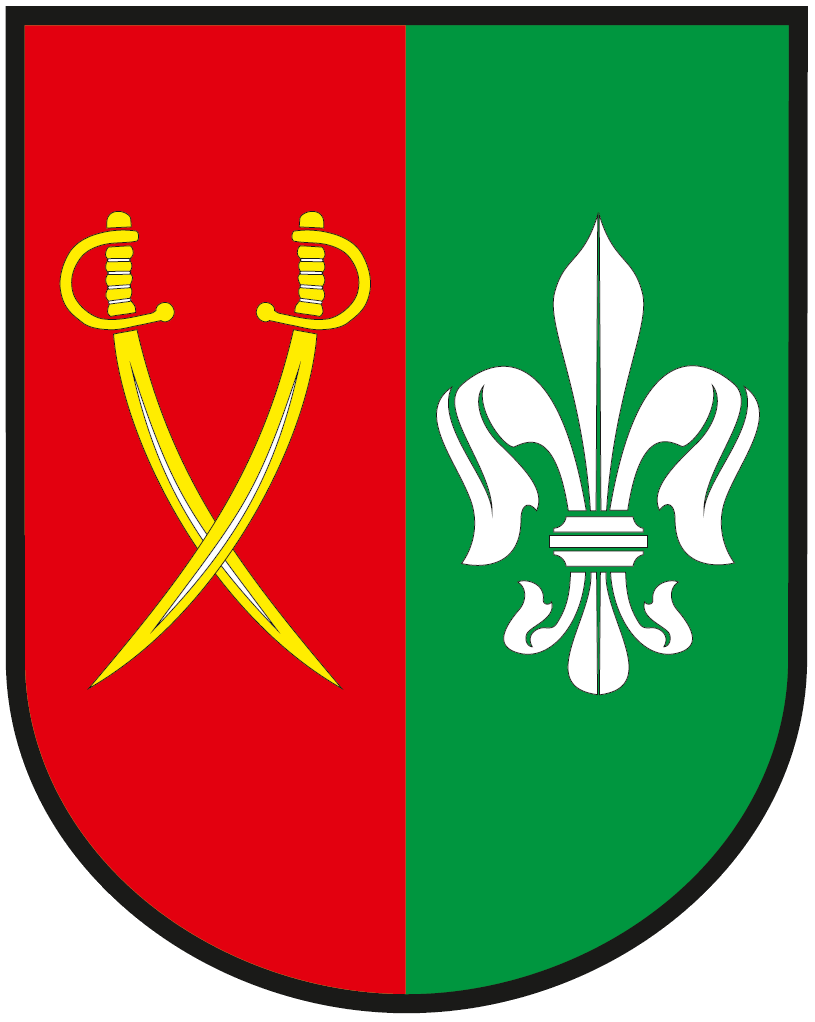
- Flag Coat of arms

- Location in the Czech Republic
- Coordinates: 49°40′6″N 13°39′49″E
- Country: Czech Republic
- Region: Plzeň
- District: Rokycany
- First mentioned: 1407

Area
  - Total: 7.11 km^{2} (2.75 sq mi)
- Elevation: 495 m (1,624 ft)

Population (2026-01-01)
  - Total: 429
  - Density: 60.3/km^{2} (156/sq mi)
- Time zone: UTC+1 (CET)
  - Summer (DST): UTC+2 (CEST)
- Postal code: 338 43
- Website: www.obecprikosice.cz

Příkosice is a municipality and village in Rokycany District in the Plzeň Region of the Czech Republic. It has about 400 inhabitants.

Příkosice lies approximately 12 kilometres (7 mi) south-east of Rokycany, 23 km (14 mi) south-east of Plzeň, and 73 km (45 mi) south-west of Prague.

== Demographics ==
Historical population
Year	Pop.	±%
1869	666	—
1880	747	+12.2%
1890	766	+2.5%
1900	678	−11.5%
1910	621	−8.4%
1921	673	+8.4%
1930	638	−5.2%
1950	425	−33.4%
1961	430	+1.2%
1970	432	+0.5%
1980	408	−5.6%
1991	344	−15.7%
2001	341	−0.9%
2011	404	+18.5%
2021	407	+0.7%
Source: Censuses
