= Vysoký Újezd =

Vysoký Újezd may refer to places in the Czech Republic:

- Vysoký Újezd (Benešov District), a municipality and village in the Central Bohemian Region
- Vysoký Újezd (Beroun District), a municipality and village in the Central Bohemian Region
- Vysoký Újezd (Hradec Králové District), a municipality and village in the Hradec Králové Region
