= Vysoký Újezd (Hradec Králové District) =

- Municipality
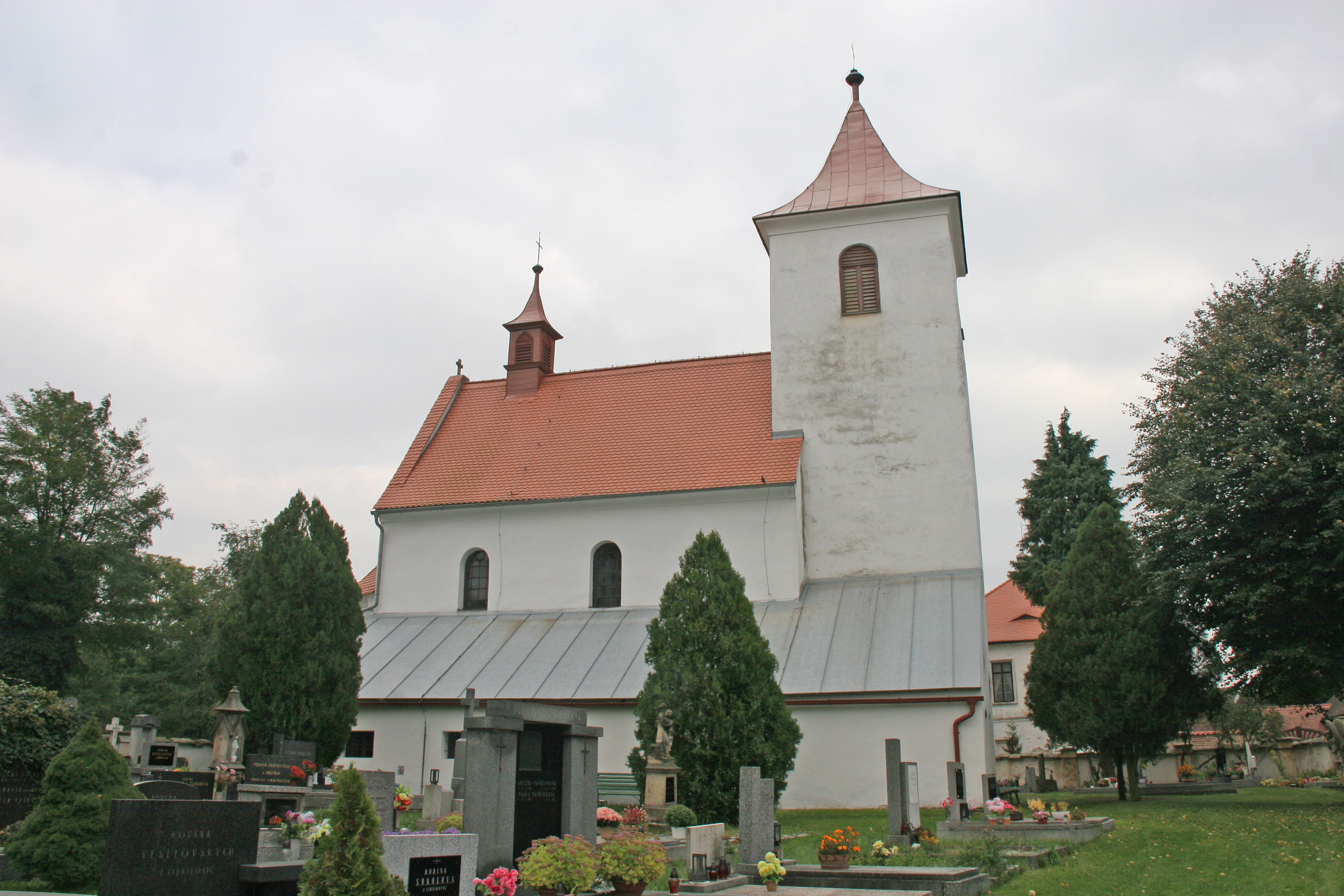
- Church of Saint James the Great

- Location in the Czech Republic
- Coordinates: 50°14′25″N 16°1′13″E
- Country: Czech Republic
- Region: Hradec Králové
- District: Hradec Králové
- First mentioned: 1369

Area
  - Total: 2.12 km^{2} (0.82 sq mi)
- Elevation: 292 m (958 ft)

Population (2026-01-01)
  - Total: 109
  - Density: 51.4/km^{2} (133/sq mi)
- Time zone: UTC+1 (CET)
  - Summer (DST): UTC+2 (CEST)
- Postal code: 517 71
- Website: www.ou-vysokyujezd.cz

Vysoký Újezd is a municipality and village in Hradec Králové District in the Hradec Králové Region of the Czech Republic. It has about 100 inhabitants.

== Demographics ==
Historical population
Year	Pop.	±%
1869	141	—
1880	138	−2.1%
1890	146	+5.8%
1900	144	−1.4%
1910	125	−13.2%
1921	119	−4.8%
1930	99	−16.8%
1950	92	−7.1%
1961	98	+6.5%
1970	88	−10.2%
1980	78	−11.4%
1991	71	−9.0%
2001	65	−8.5%
2011	71	+9.2%
2021	97	+36.6%
Source: Censuses
