= Vysoký Újezd (Benešov District) =

- Municipality
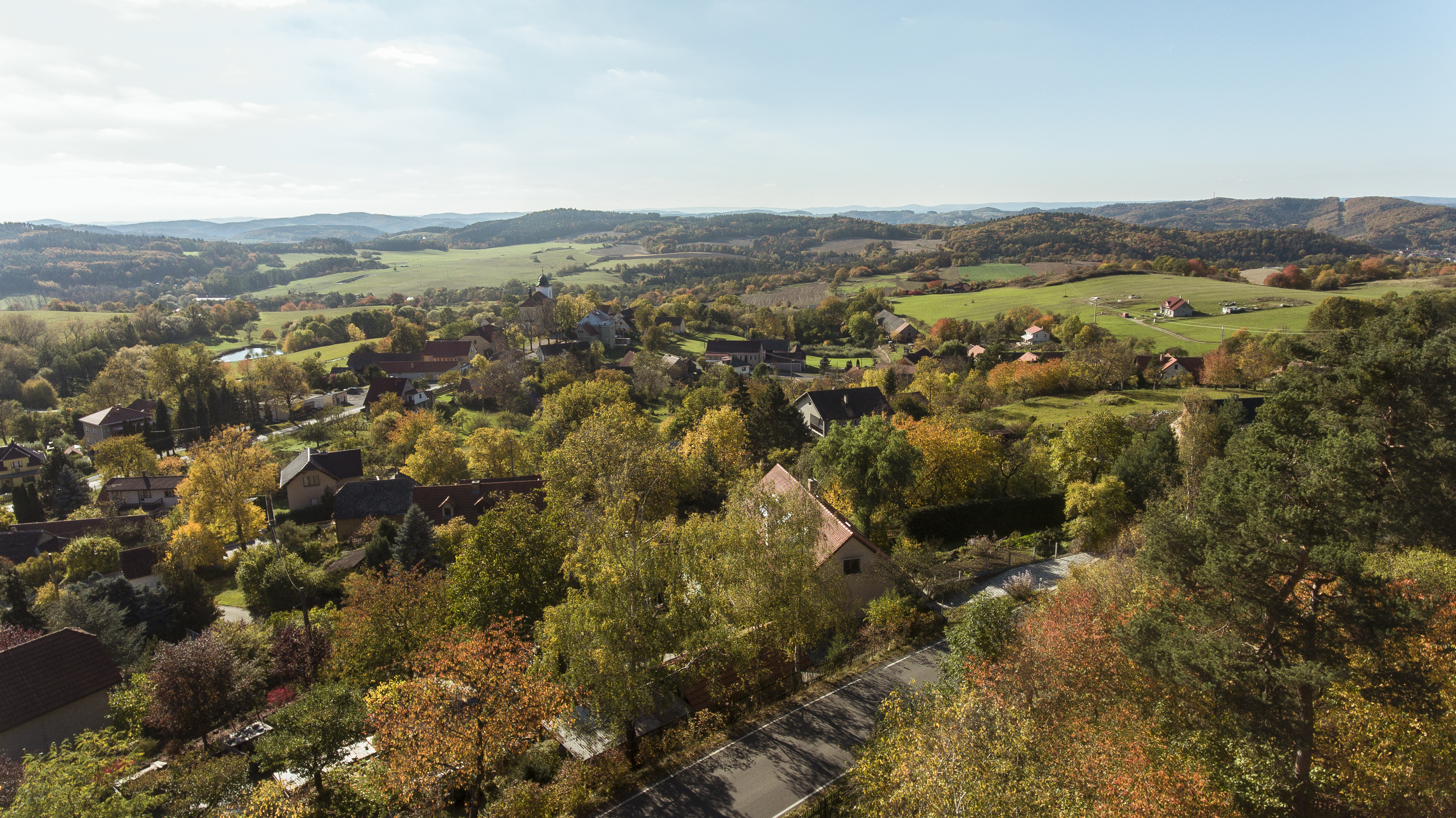
- View from the northeast

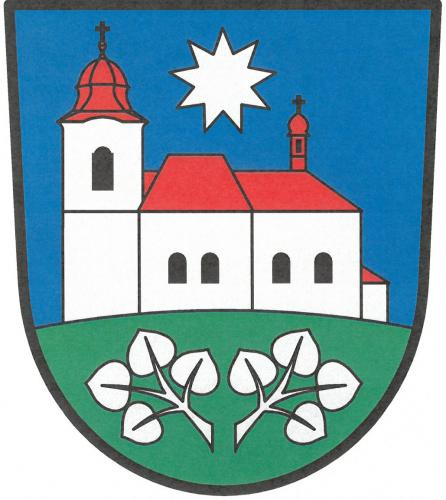
- Flag Coat of arms

- Location in the Czech Republic
- Coordinates: 49°48′48″N 14°28′35″E
- Country: Czech Republic
- Region: Central Bohemian
- District: Benešov
- First mentioned: 1352

Area
  - Total: 4.07 km^{2} (1.57 sq mi)
- Elevation: 403 m (1,322 ft)

Population (2026-01-01)
  - Total: 192
  - Density: 47.2/km^{2} (122/sq mi)
- Time zone: UTC+1 (CET)
  - Summer (DST): UTC+2 (CEST)
- Postal code: 257 44
- Website: www.obecvysokyujezd.cz

Vysoký Újezd is a municipality and village in Benešov District in the Central Bohemian Region of the Czech Republic. It has about 200 inhabitants.

== Administrative division ==
Vysoký Újezd consists of two municipal parts (in brackets population according to the 2021 census):

- Vysoký Újezd (115)
- Větrov (70)

== Etymology ==
Újezd is a common name of Czech villages. The name Vysoký Újezd means 'high Újezd'.

== Geography ==
Vysoký Újezd is located about 15 kilometres (9 mi) west of Benešov and 25 km (16 mi) south of Prague. It lies in the Benešov Uplands. The highest point is at 507 m (1,663 ft) above sea level.

== History ==
The first written mention of Vysoký Újezd is 1352. The village may have been founded in the first half of the 12th century, when a Romanesque rotunda stood on the site of today's church.

== Demographics ==
Historical population

Year	Pop.	±%
1869	341	—
1880	397	+16.4%
1890	396	−0.3%
1900	349	−11.9%
1910	364	+4.3%

Year	Pop.	±%
1921	371	+1.9%
1930	383	+3.2%
1950	238	−37.9%
1961	251	+5.5%
1970	233	−7.2%

Year	Pop.	±%
1980	204	−12.4%
1991	170	−16.7%
2001	171	+0.6%
2011	205	+19.9%
2021	185	−9.8%

Source: Censuses

== Transport ==
There are no railways or major roads passing through the municipality.

== Sights ==
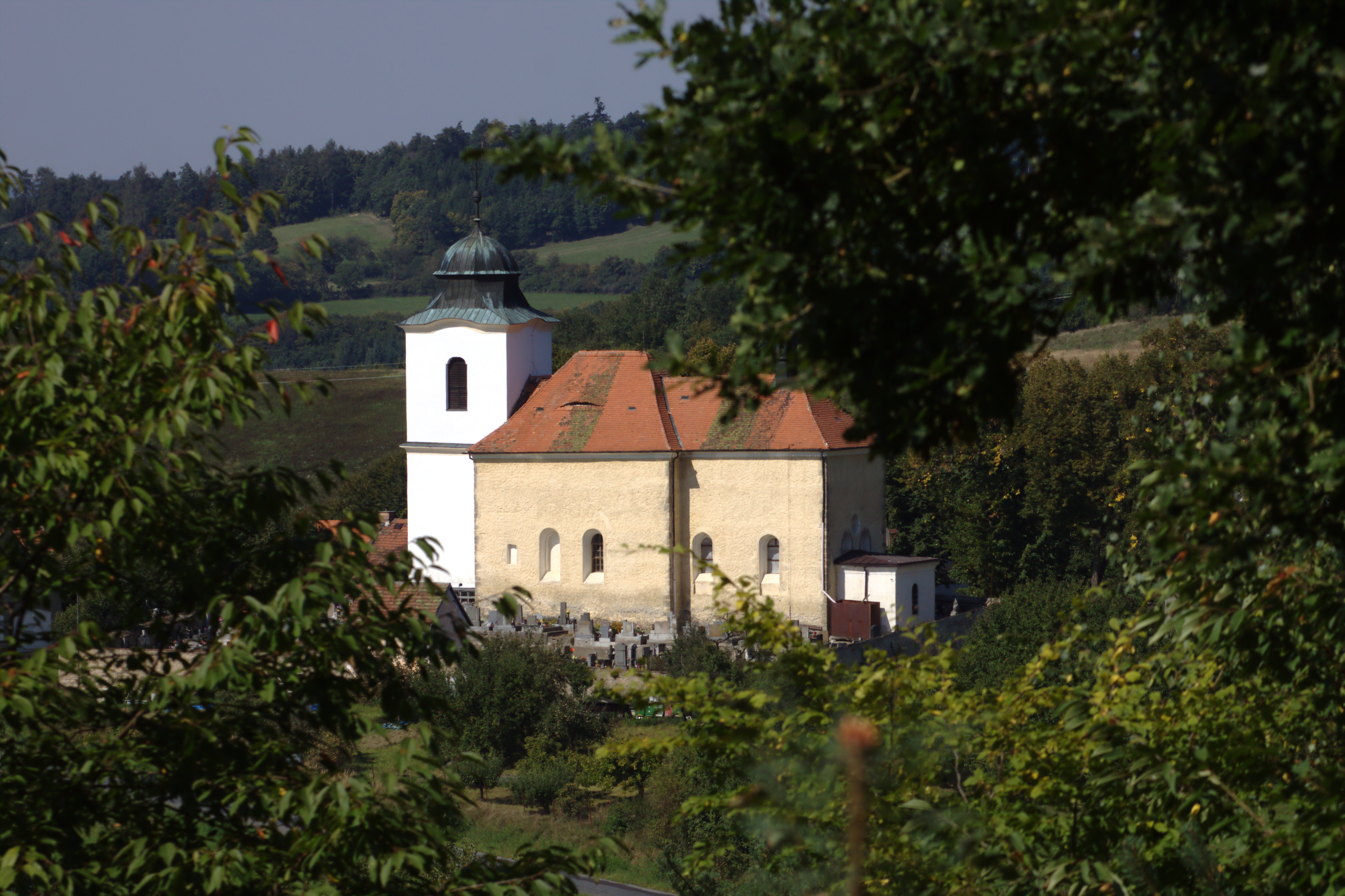
Church of the Nativity of the Virgin Mary

The main landmark of Vysoký Újezd is the Church of the Nativity of the Virgin Mary. It was built in the early Gothic style at the end of the 13th century. It was rebuilt several times and modified in the Baroque style.
