= List of castles in the Plzeň Region =

This is a list of castles and chateaux located in the Plzeň Region of the Czech Republic.

== A ==
- Alfrédov Chateau
- Angerbach Castle

== B ==
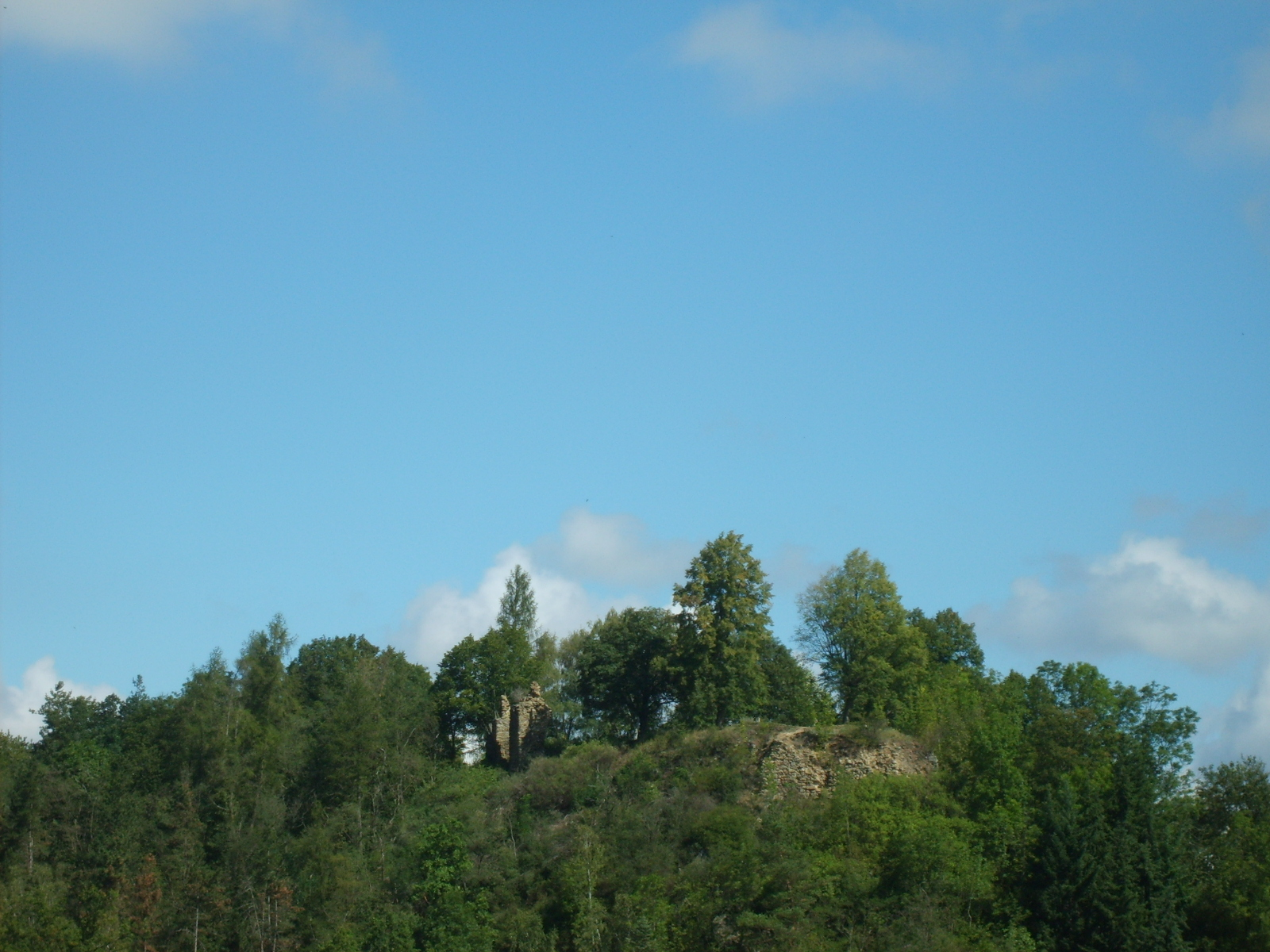
Ruins of Bělá Castle above Dolní Bělá, Plzeň-North District.

- Berchembogen Chateau
- Bezděkov Chateau
- Bezdružice Chateau
- Běhařov Chateau
- Bělá Castle
- Běšiny Chateau
- Bor u Tachova Chateau
- Brdo Castle
- Broumov Chateau
- Březina Castle
- Březina Chateau
- Březín Castle
- Buben Castle
- Budětice Castle
- Bušovice Chateau
- Bystřice nad Úhlavou Chateau

== C ==
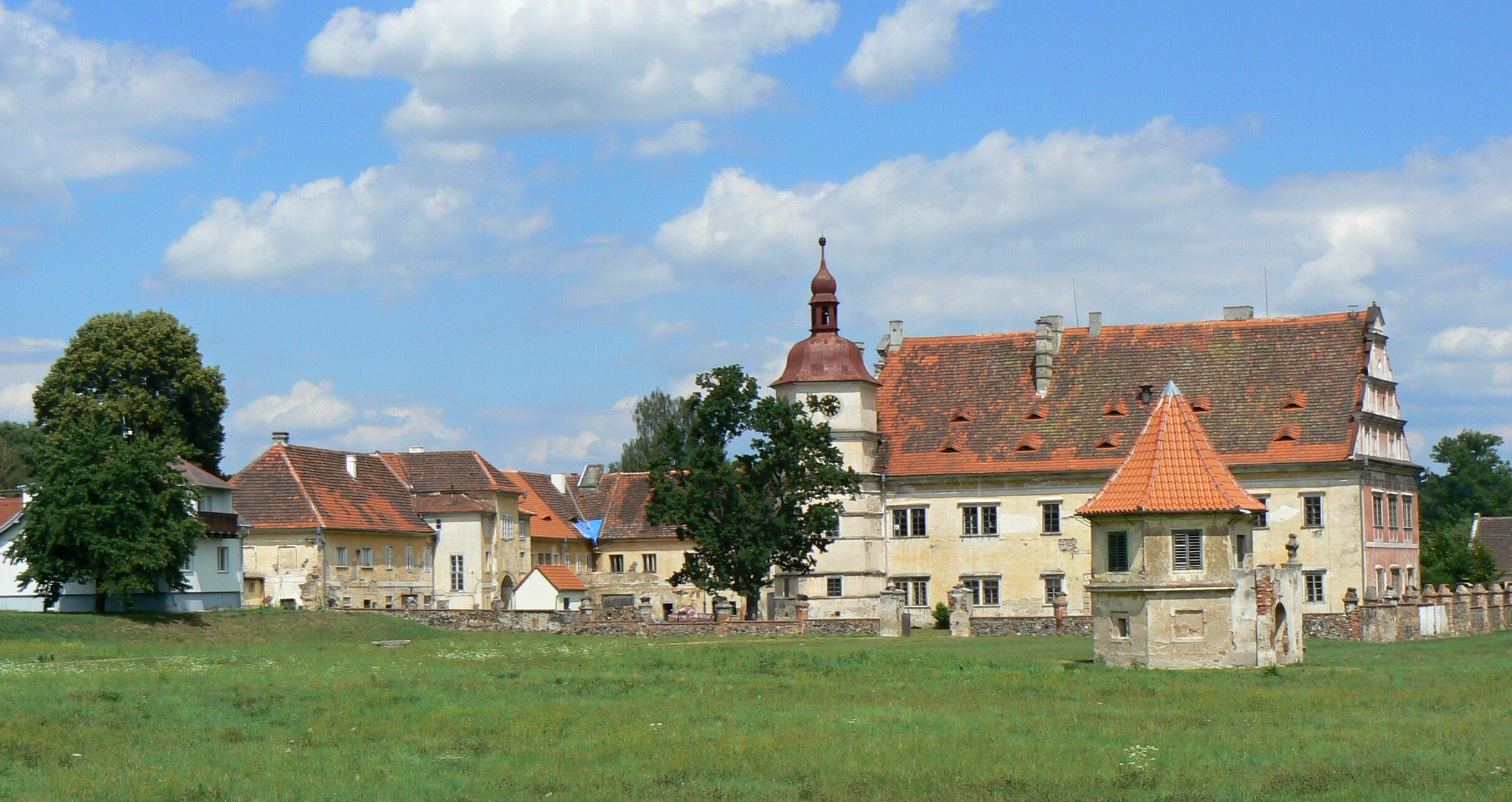
Červené Poříčí Chateau, Klatovy District.

- Cebiv Chateau
- Chanovice Chateau
- Chocenice Chateau
- Chodová Planá Chateau
- Chotiměř Chateau
- Chříč Chateau
- Chudenice Chateau
- Částkov Chateau
- Čečovice Chateau
- Čeminy Chateau
- Černá Hať Chateau
- Červené Poříčí Chateau

== D ==
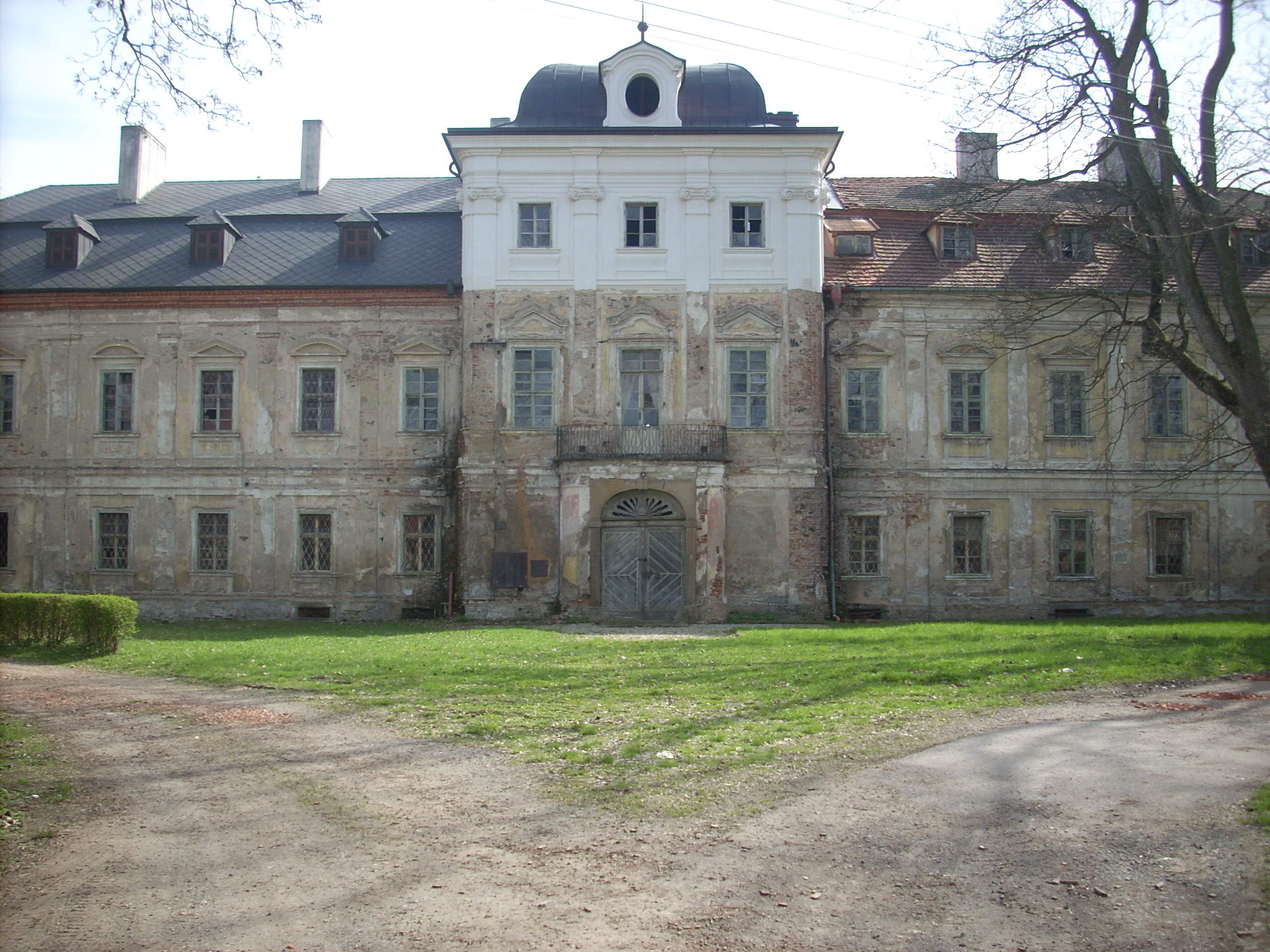
Dolní Lukavice Chateau, Plzeň-South District

- Defurovy Lažany Chateau
- Dolejší Krušec Chateau
- Dolejší Těšov Chateau
- Dolní Lukavice Chateau
- Domažlice Castle
- Dožice Chateau

== F ==
- Falštejn Castle
- Frumštejn Castle

== G ==
- Gutštejn Castle

== H ==
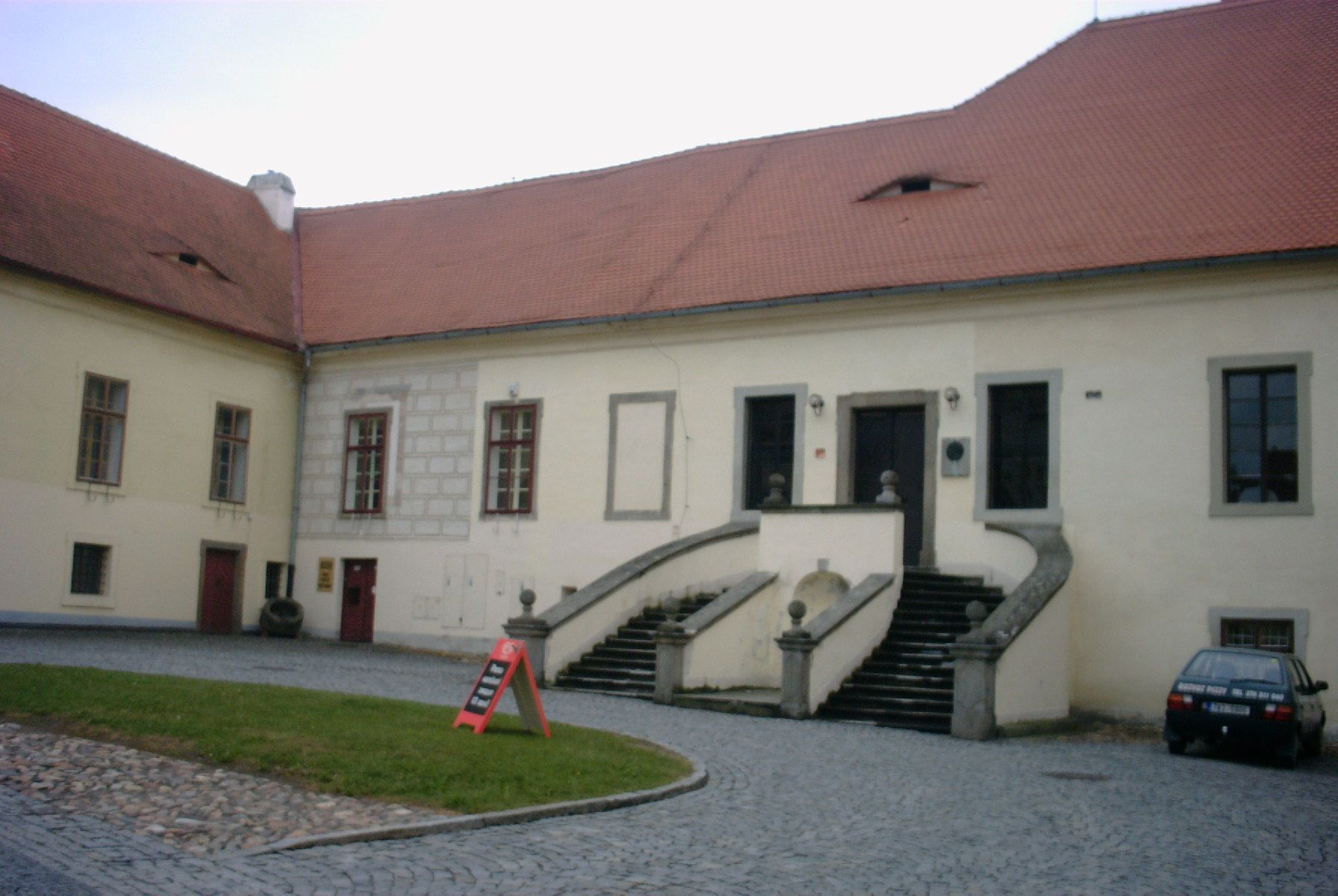
Horažďovice Chateau, Klatovy District.

- Hlavňovice Chateau
- Homberk Castle
- Horažďovice Chateau
- Horšovský Týn Chateau
- Hořákov Chateau
- Hrad pod Hrnčířem Castle
- Hrad u Strašína Castle
- Hradiště nad Javornicí Castle
- Hradiště Chateau
- Hřešihlavy Chateau
- Hrádek u České Břízy Castle
- Hrádek u Sušice Chateau
- Hrádek Castle

== J ==
- Janovice nad Úhlavou Castle
- Jánský zámek Chateau
- Ježovy Chateau
- Jindřichovice Chateau

== K ==
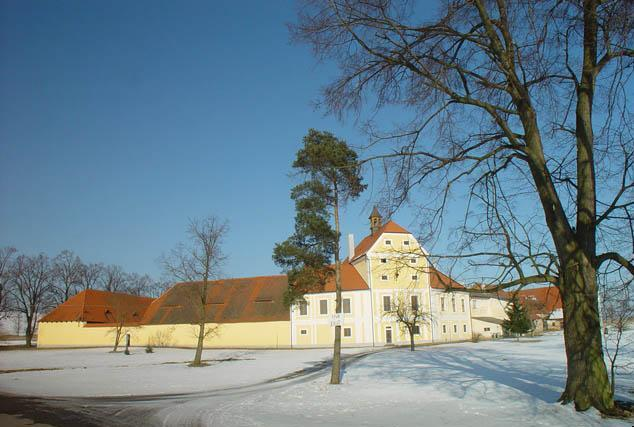
Kalec Chateau, Plzeň-North District.

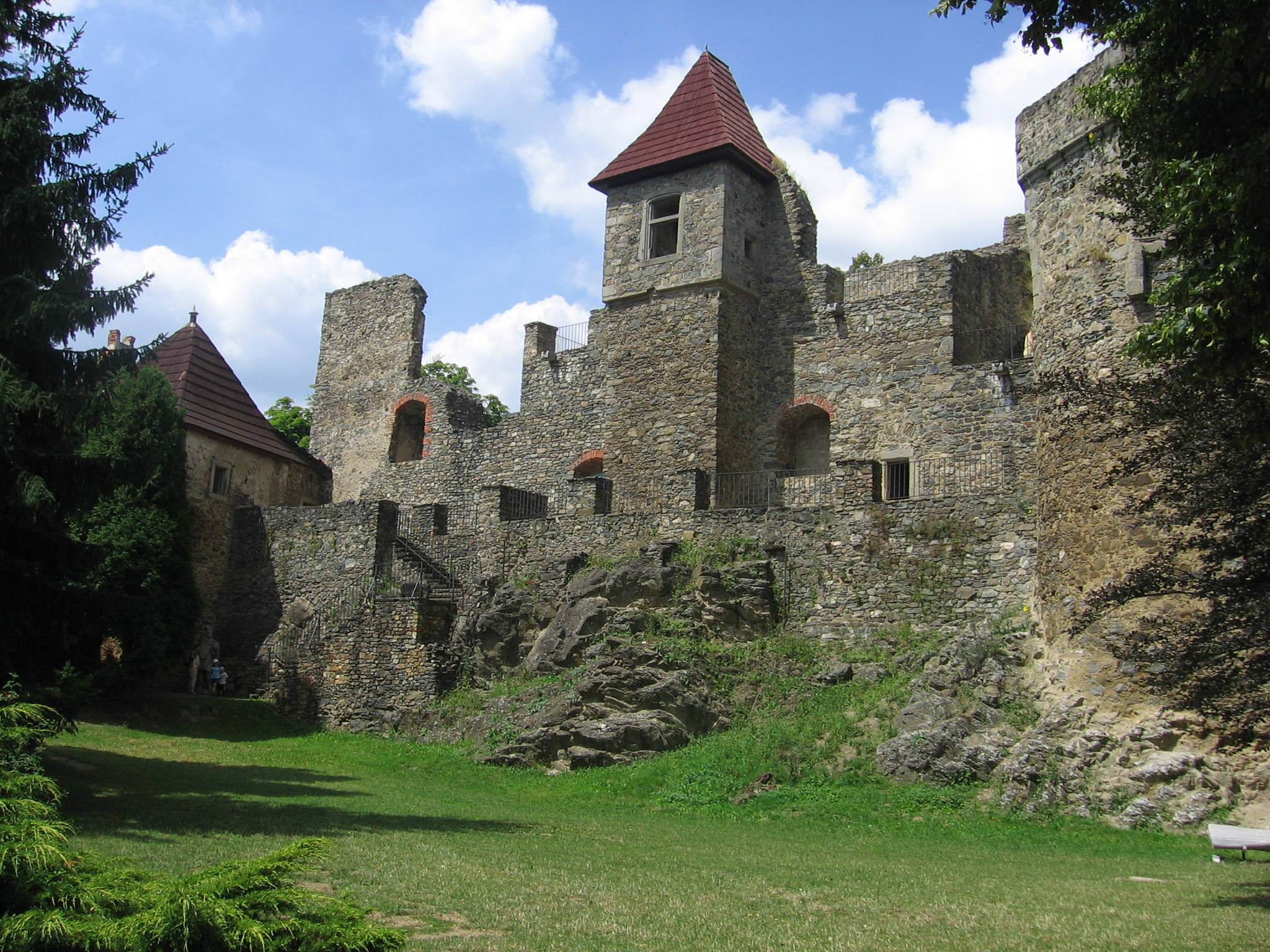
Klenová Castle, Klatovy District.

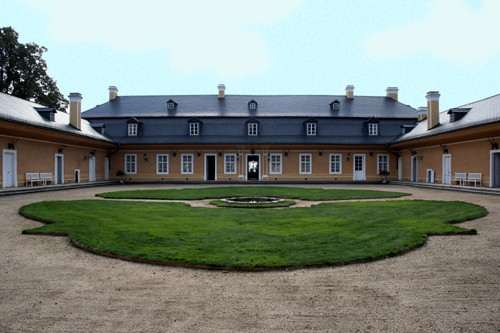
Kozel Chateau, Plzeň-South District.

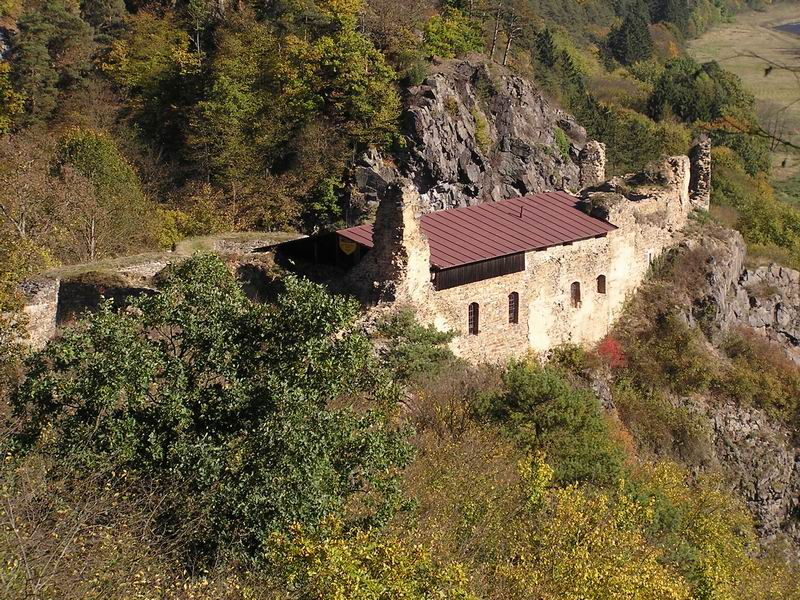
Krašov Castle, Plzeň-North District.

- Kaceřov Chateau
- Kalec Chateau
- Kamýk Chateau
- Kanice Chateau
- Karlov Chateau
- Kašperk Castle
- Klabava Castle
- Klenová Castle
- Kojšice Chateau
- Kokšín Castle
- Kolinec Chateau
- Komberk Castle
- Komošín Castle
- Kozel Chateau
- Krasíkov Castle
- Krašov Castle
- Křimice Chateau
- Kundratice Chateau
- Kyjov Castle

== L ==
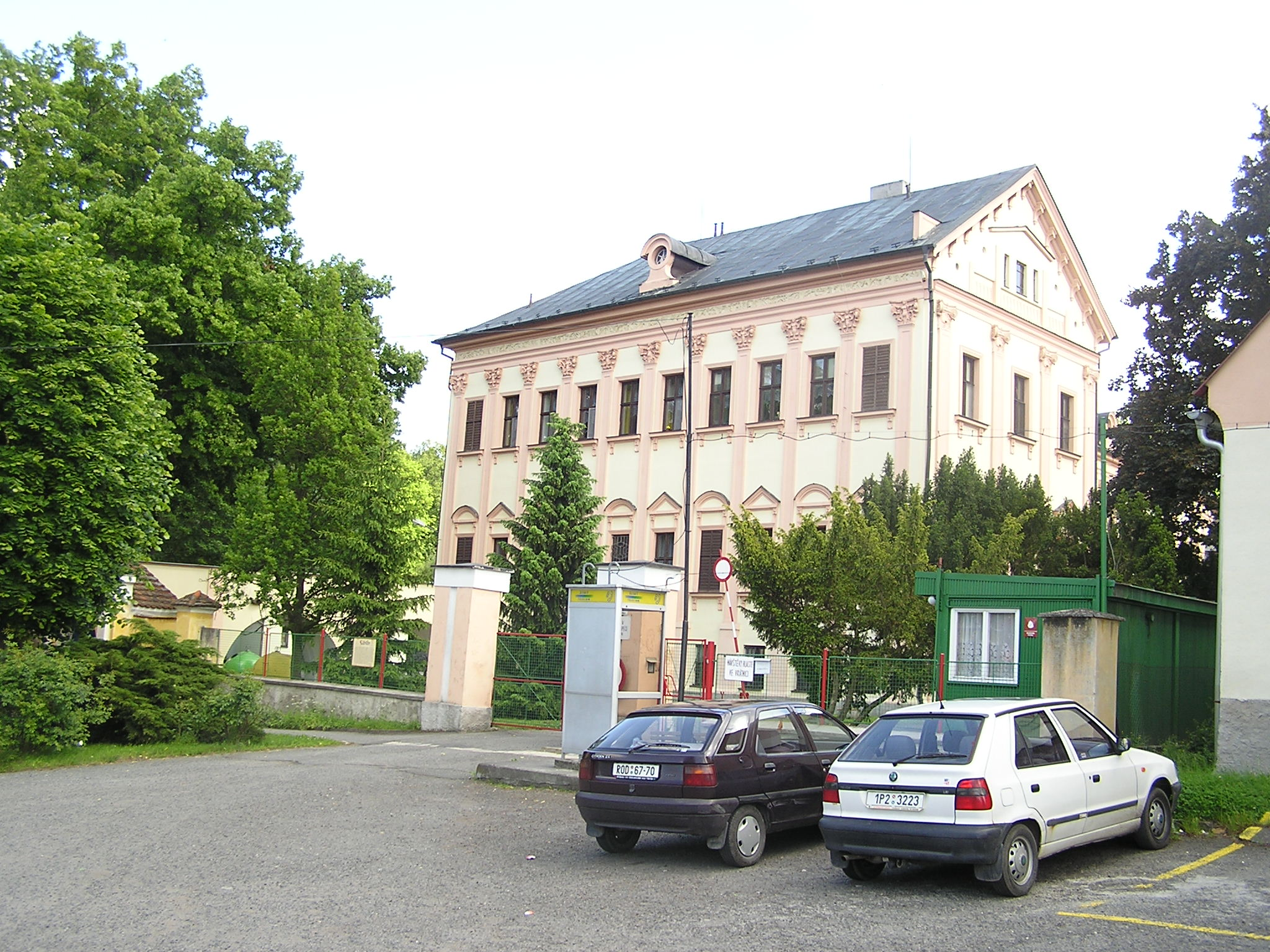
Liblín Chateau, Rokycany District.

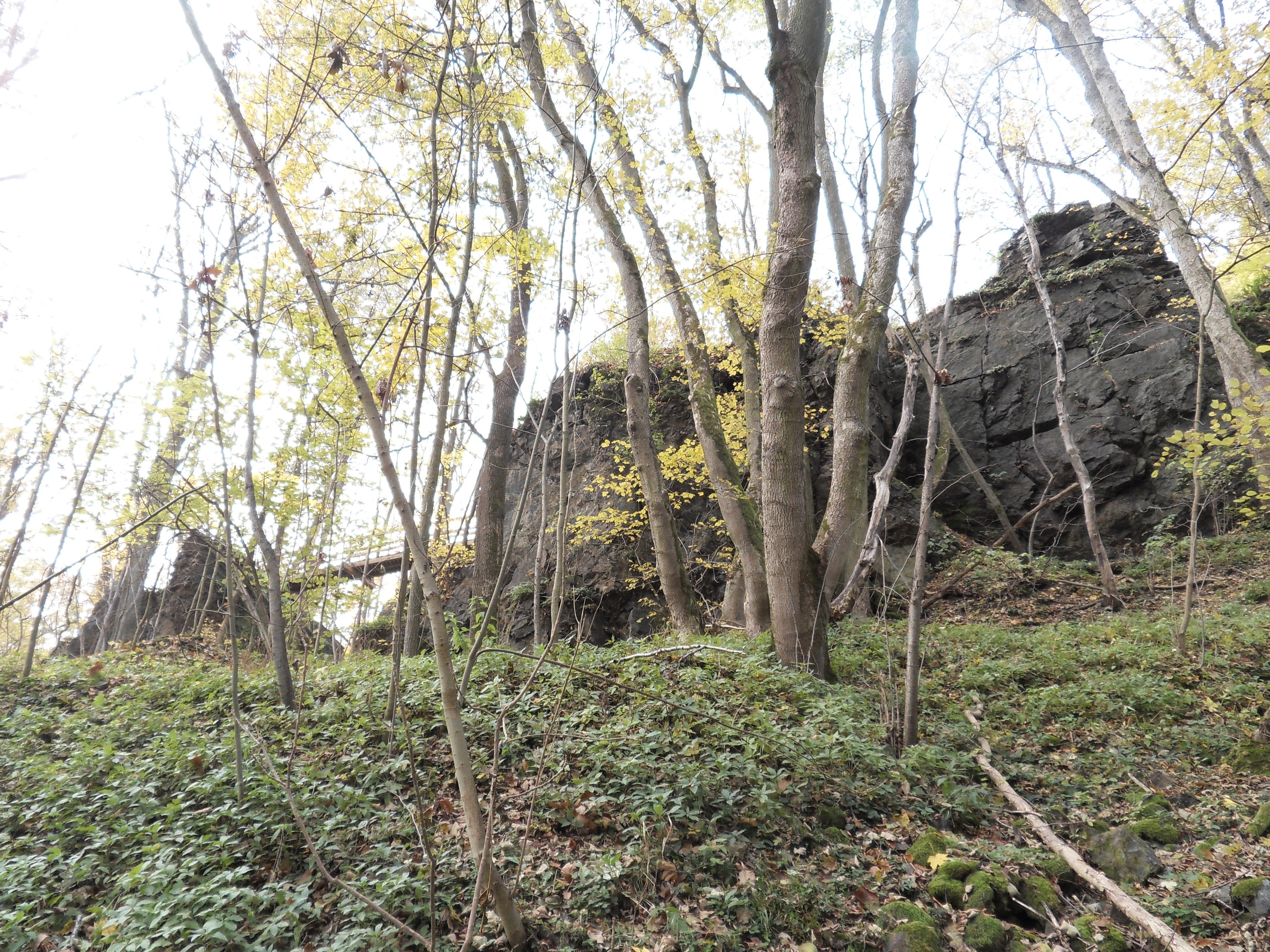
Ruins of Lopata Castle, Plzeň-South District.

- Lacembok Castle
- Lazurová hora Castle
- Lázeň Chateau
- Lázně Letiny Chateau
- Lednice Chateau
- Liblín Chateau
- Libštejn Castle
- Lipová Lhota Chateau
- Litice Castle
- Lopata Castle
- Loreta Chateau
- Lovčice Chateau
- Luhov Chateau
- Lužany Chateau

== M ==
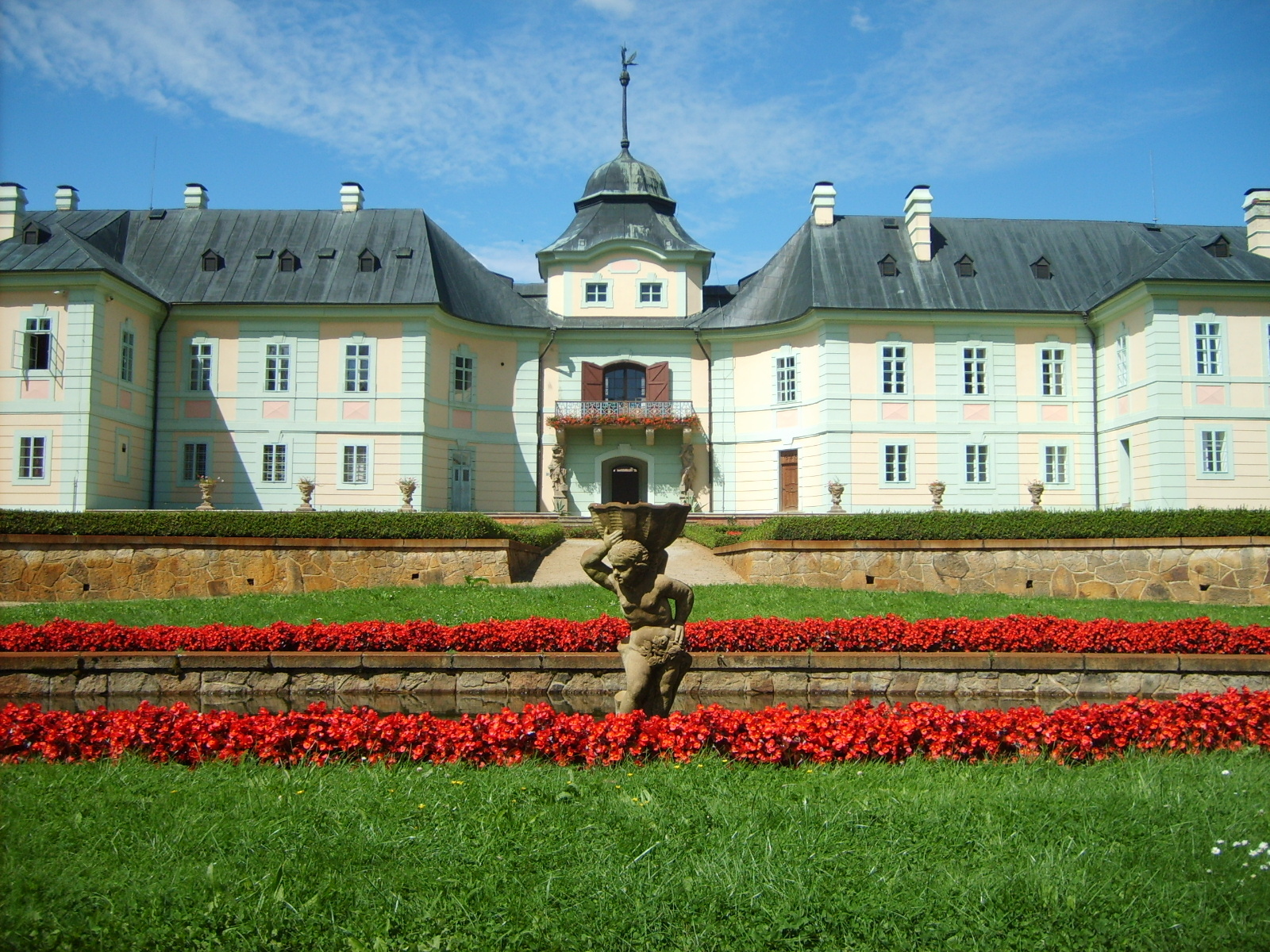
Manětín Chateau, Plzeň-North District.

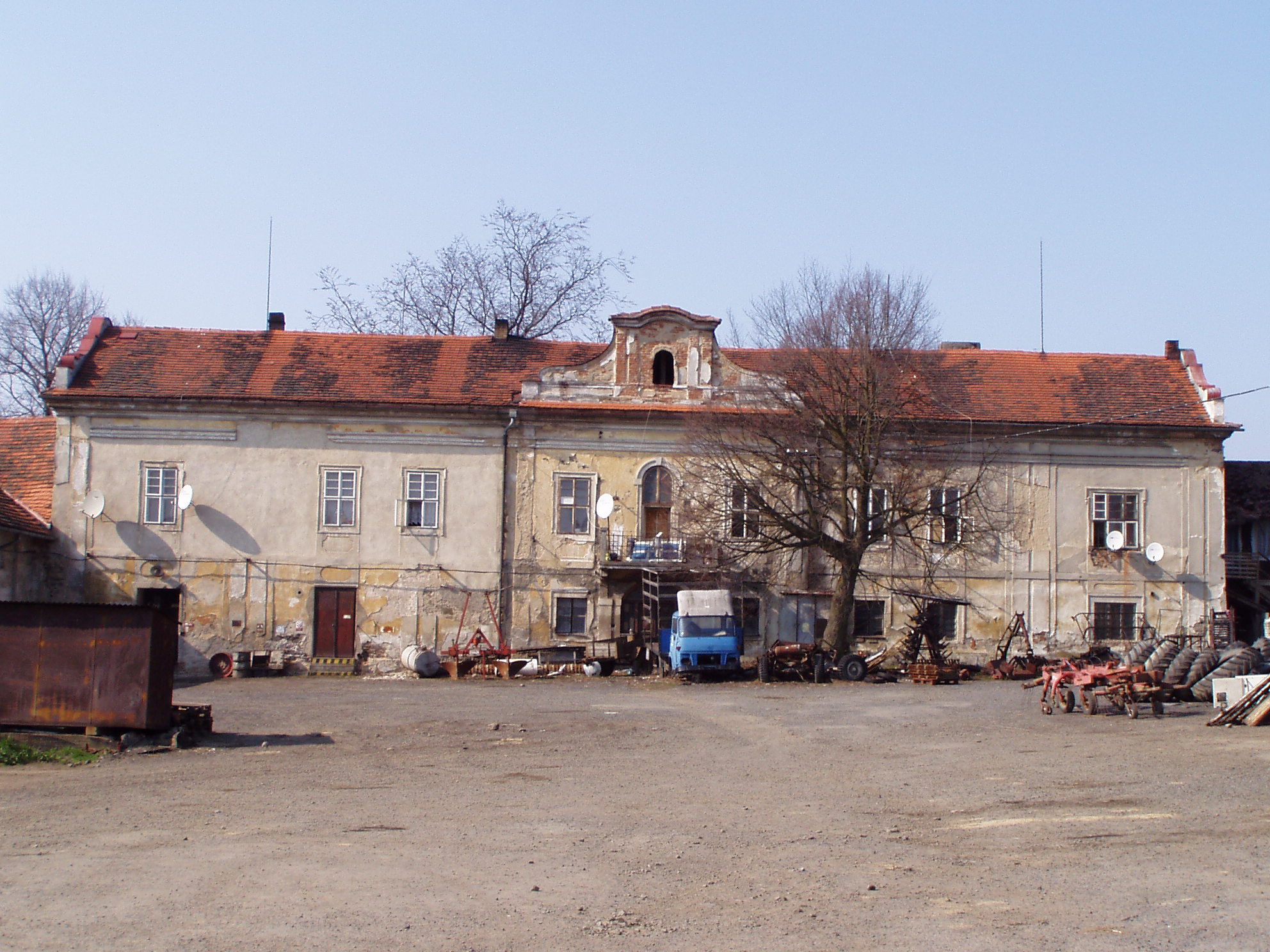
Měčín Chateau, Klatovy District.

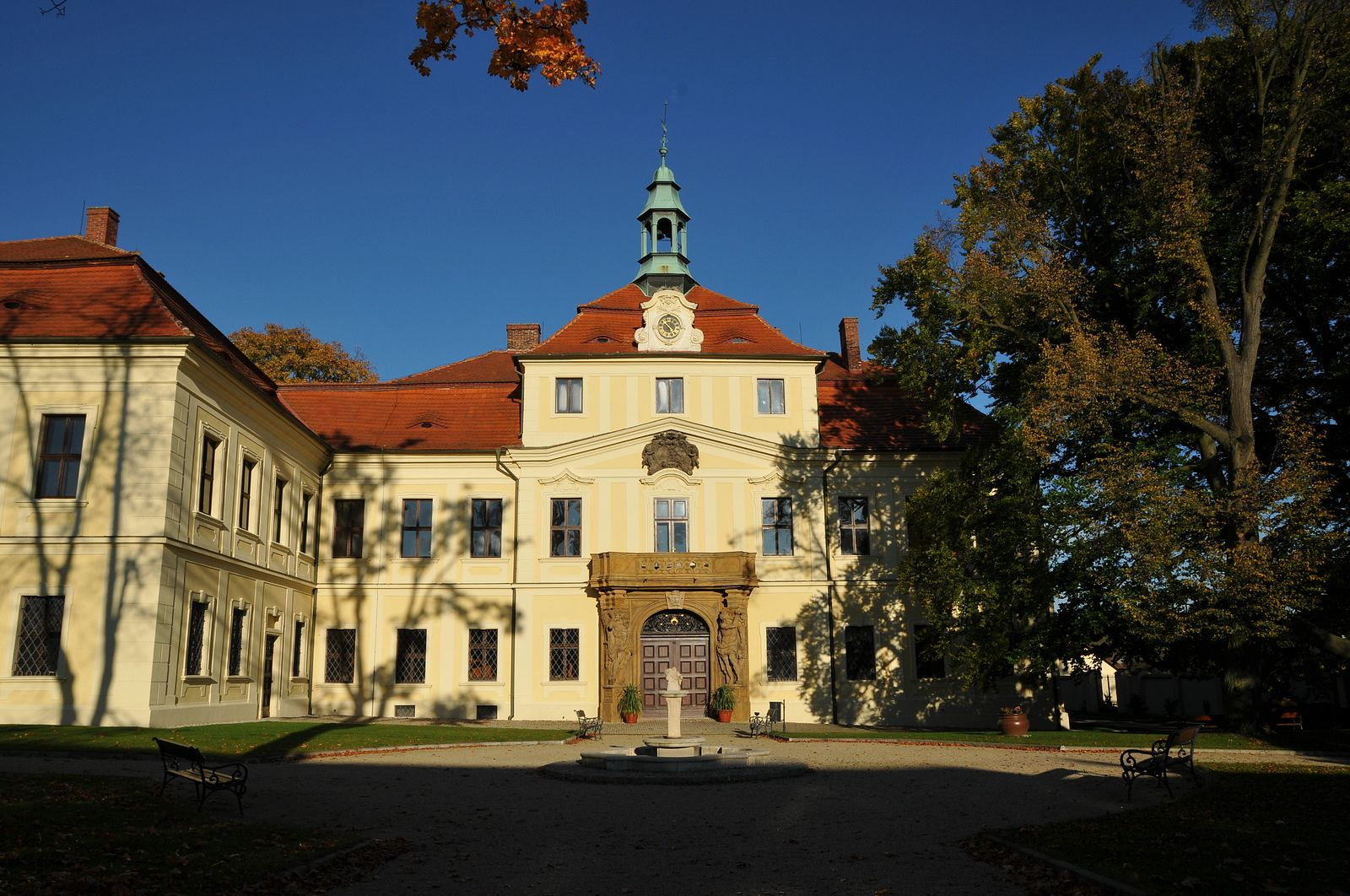
Mirošov Chateau, Rokycany District.

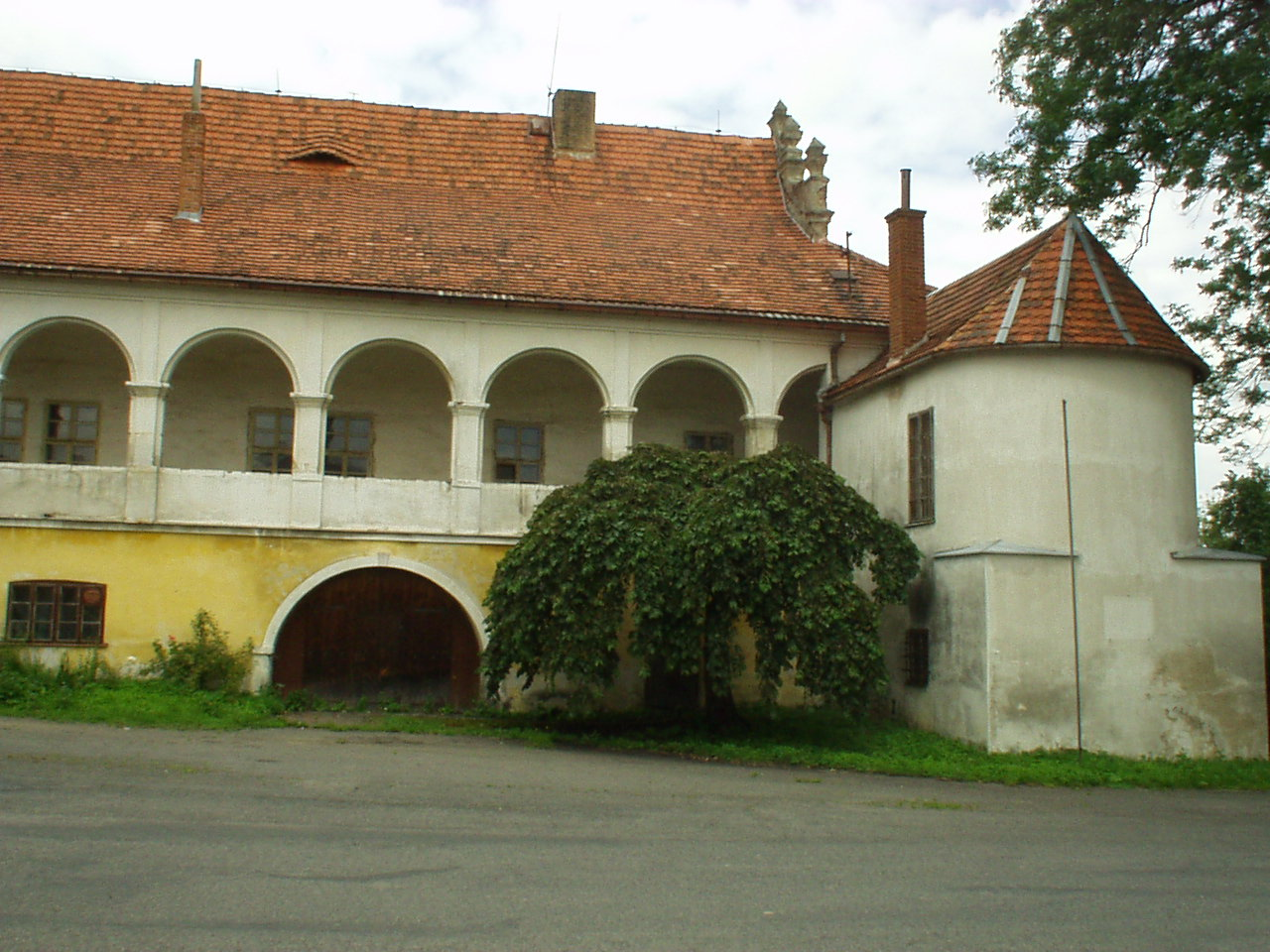
Mokrosuky Chateau, Klatovy District.

- Mačice Chateau
- Malešice Chateau
- Manětín Chateau
- Merklín Chateau
- Měcholupy Chateau
- Měčín Chateau
- Mirošov Chateau
- Mlázovy Chateau
- Mochtín Chateau
- Mokrosuky Chateau

== N ==
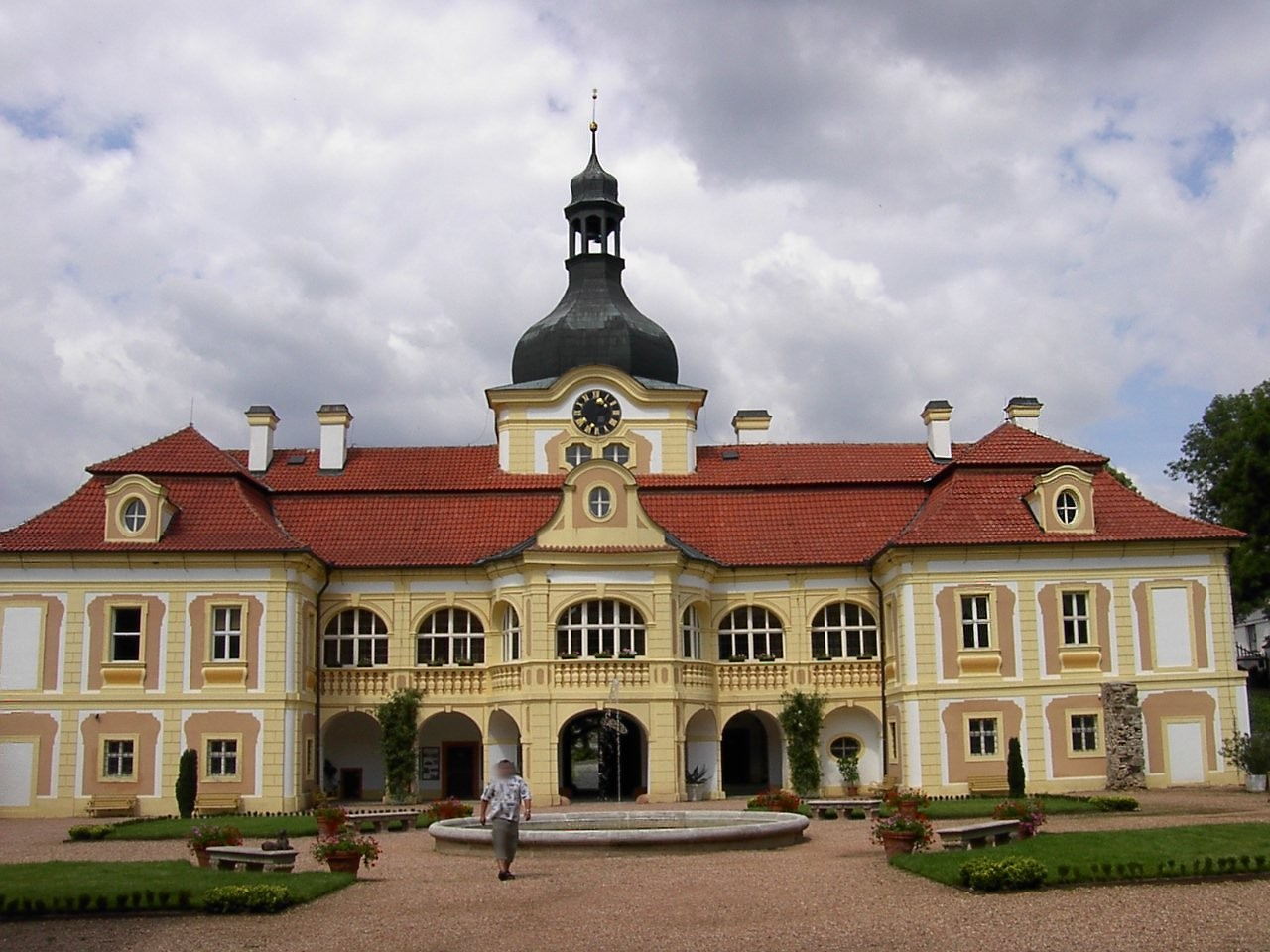
Nebílovy Chateau, Plzeň-South District.

- Nahošice Chateau
- Nalžovy Chateau
- Nebílovy Chateau
- Nečtinský Špičák Castle
- Nečtiny Chateau
- Nedražice Chateau
- Nekmíř Chateau
- Netřeby Castle
- Nový Čestín Chateau
- Nový Dvůr Chateau
- Nový Herštejn Castle

== O ==
- Osek u Rokycan Chateau
- Oselce Chateau
- Osvračín Castle
- Osvračín Chateau

== P ==
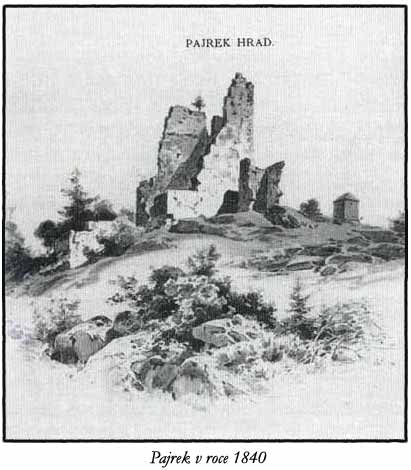
Pajrek Castle (in 1840), Klatovy District.

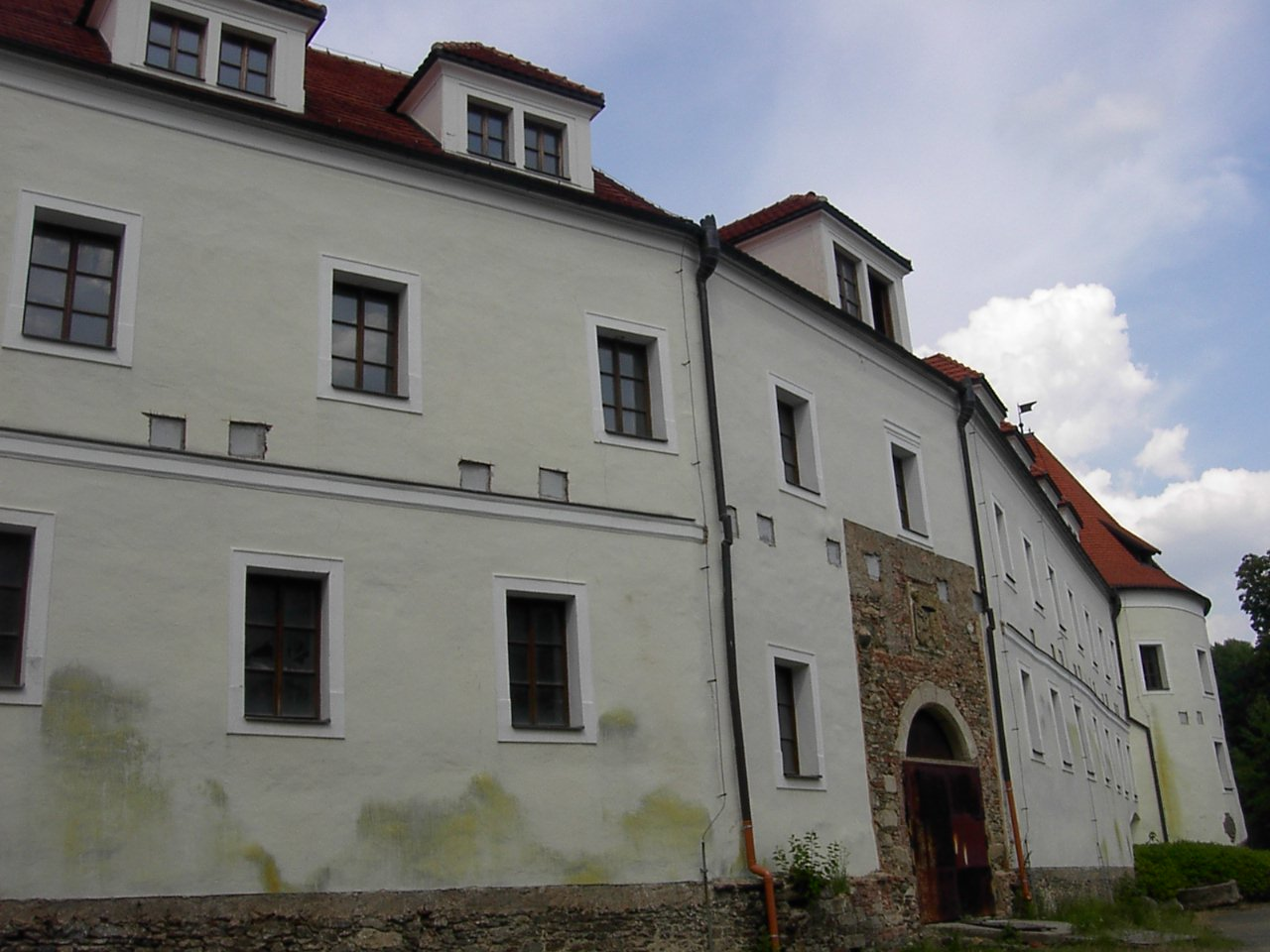
Poběžovice Chateau, Domažlice District.

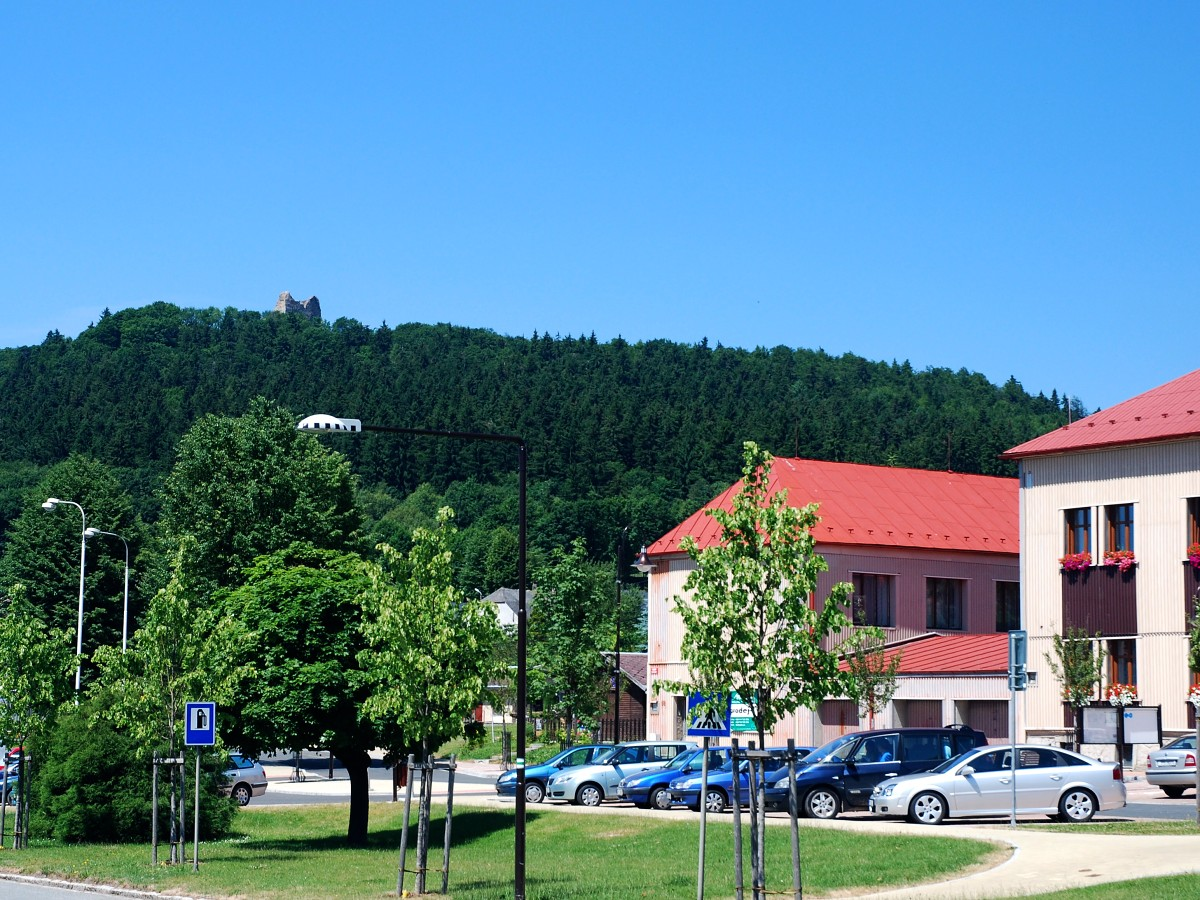
Ruins of Přimda Castle (at the top), Tachov District.

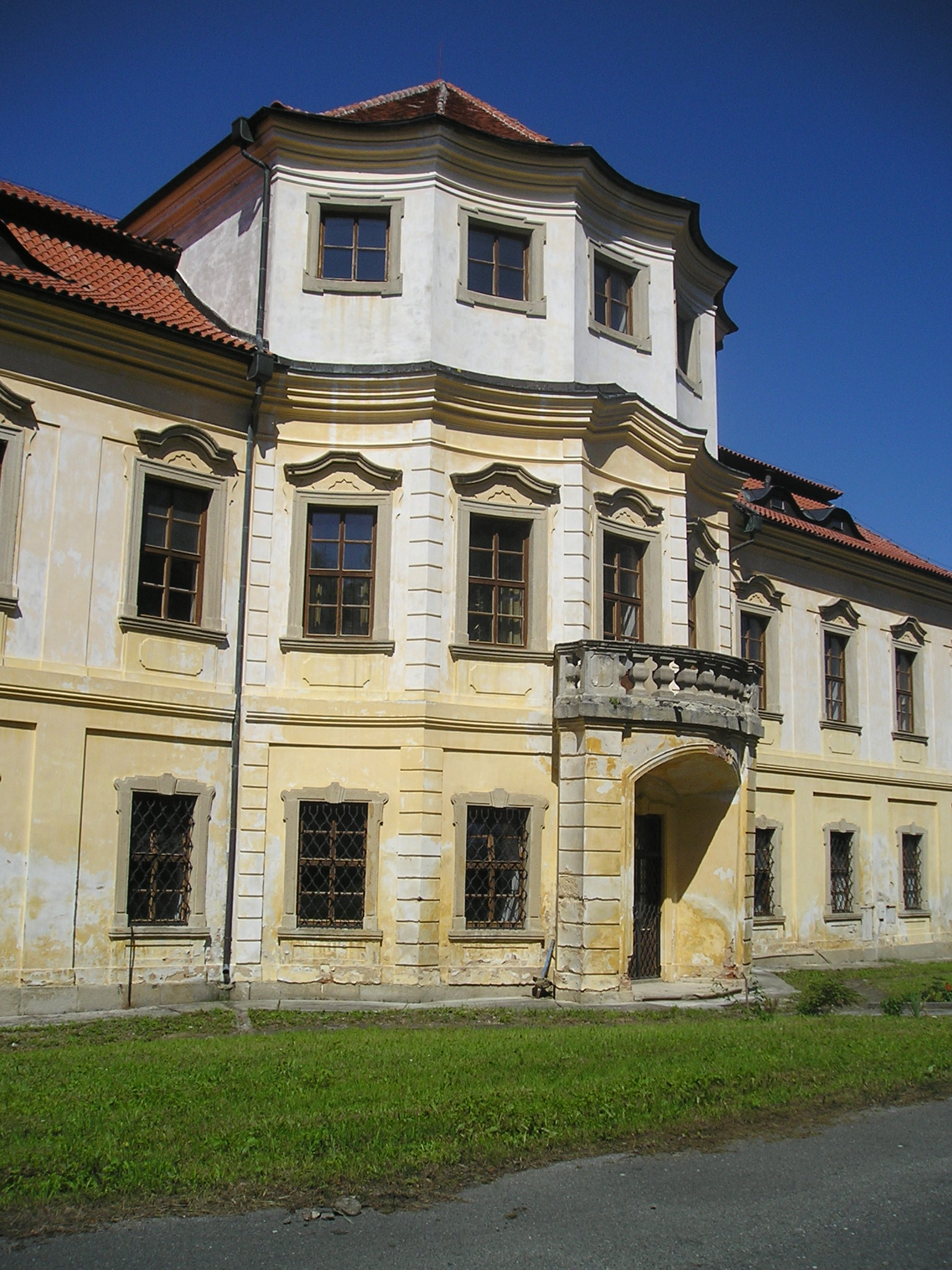
Příchovice Chateau, Plzeň-South District.

- Pajrek Castle
- Palvinov Chateau
- Petrovice Castle
- Plánice Chateau
- Pňovany Chateau
- Poběžovice Chateau
- Podhůří Chateau
- Podmokly Castle
- Podmokly Chateau
- Podolí Chateau
- Potštejn u Žinkov Castle
- Prašný Újezd Chateau
- Prácheň Castle
- Preitenštejn Castle
- Prostiboř Castle
- Přestavlky Chateau
- Přimda Castle
- Příchovice Chateau
- Příkopy Castle
- Přívozec Chateau
- Ptenín Chateau
- Pustý Hrádek Castle
- Pušperk Castle

== R ==
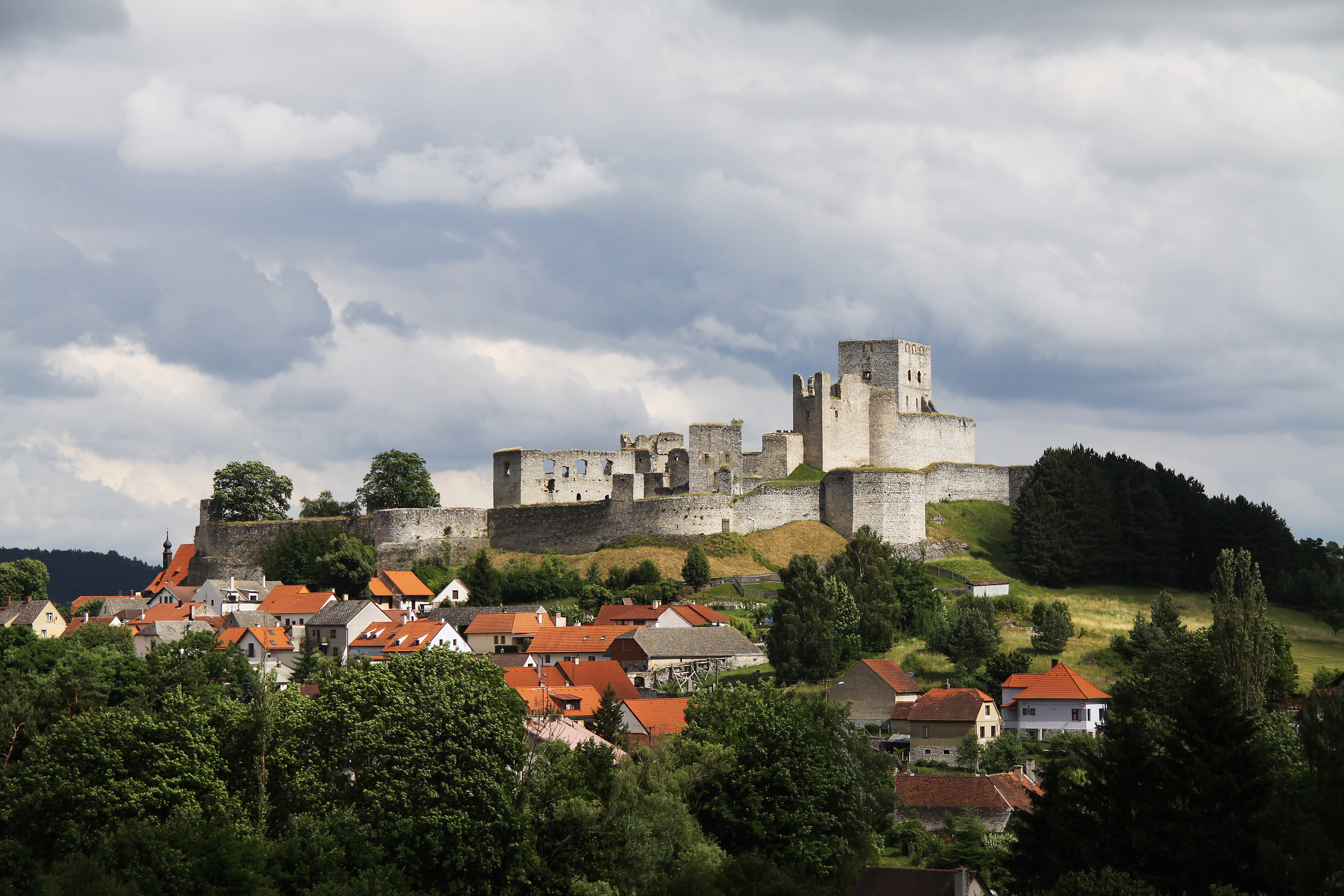
Rabí Castle, Klatovy District.

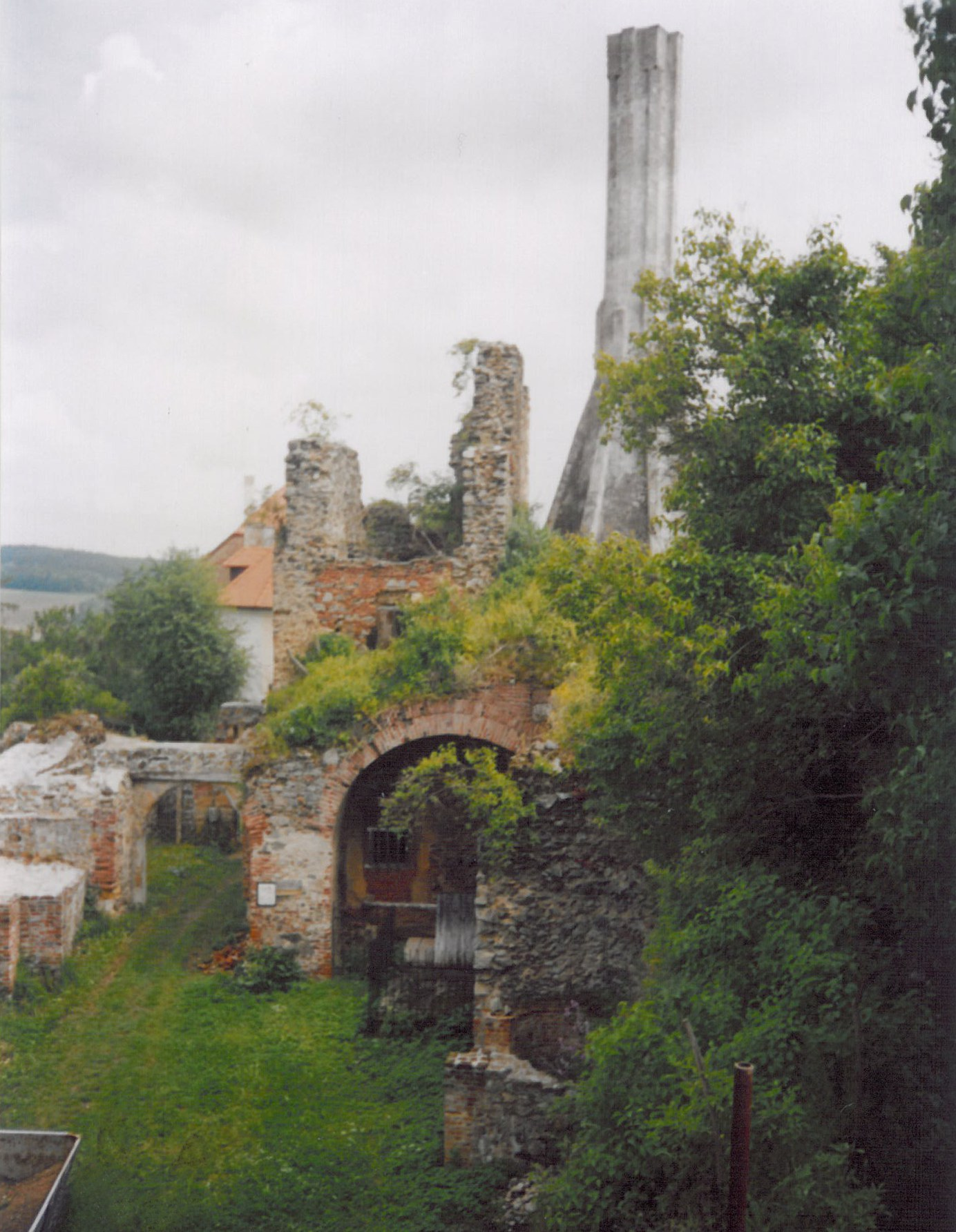
Ruins of Roupov Castle, Plzeň-South District.

- Rabí Castle
- Rabštejn nad Střelou Chateau
- Radčice Chateau
- Radeč Castle
- Radnice Chateau
- Radyně Castle
- Rochlov Chateau
- Roupov Castle
- Ruchomperk Castle
- Rýzmberk Castle
- Řebřík Castle

== S ==
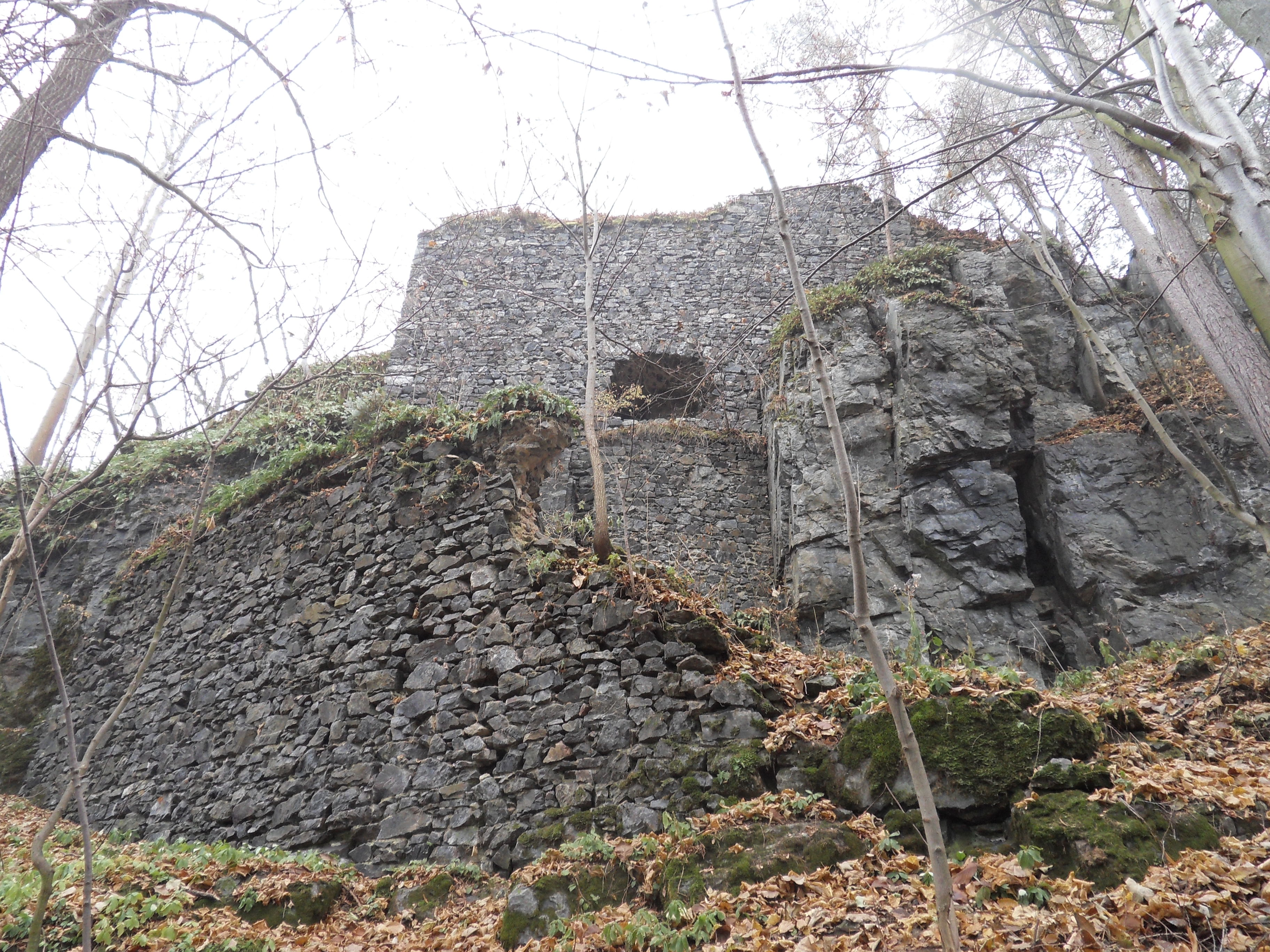
Skála Castle, Plzeň-South District.

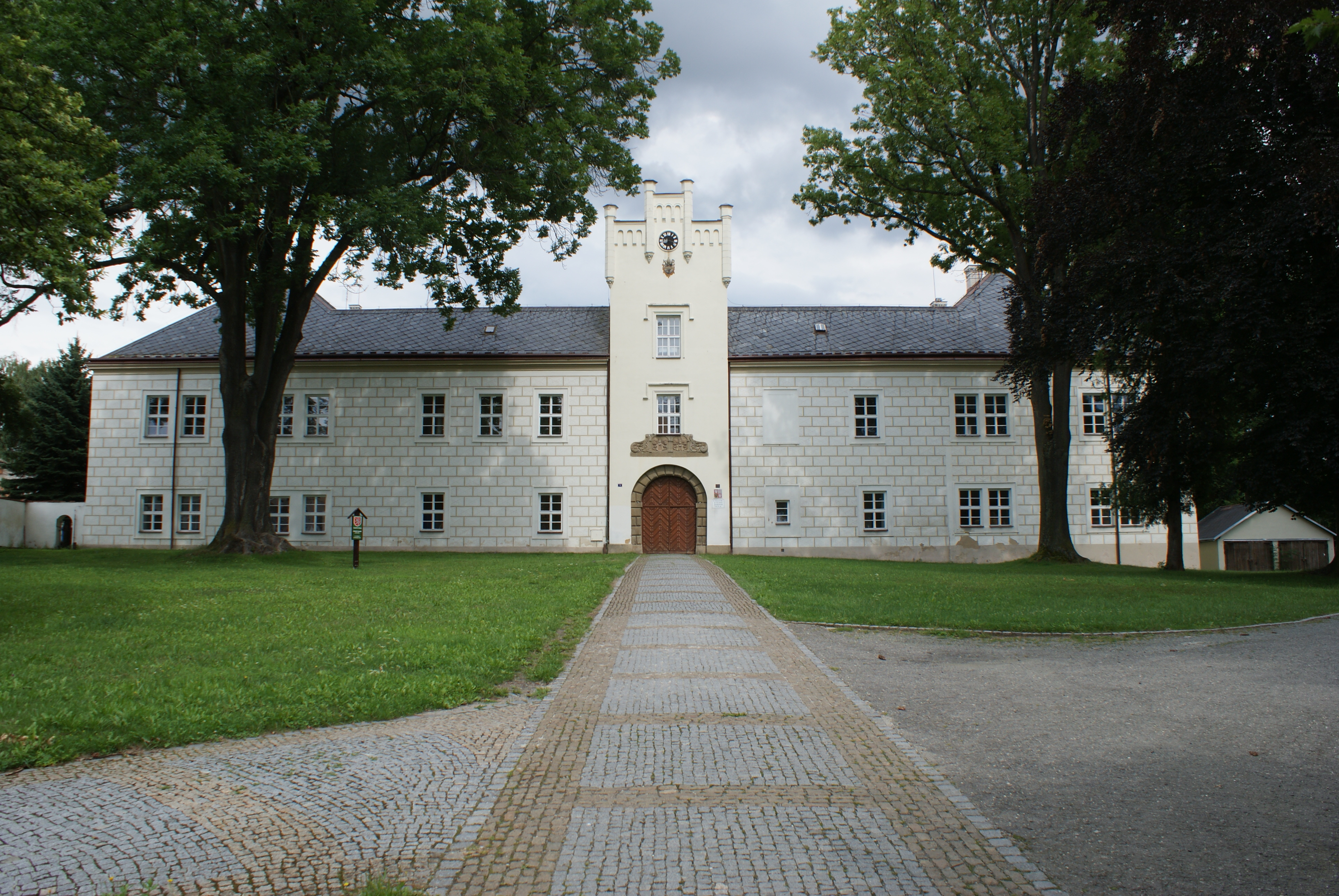
Spálené Poříčí Chateau, Plzeň-South District.

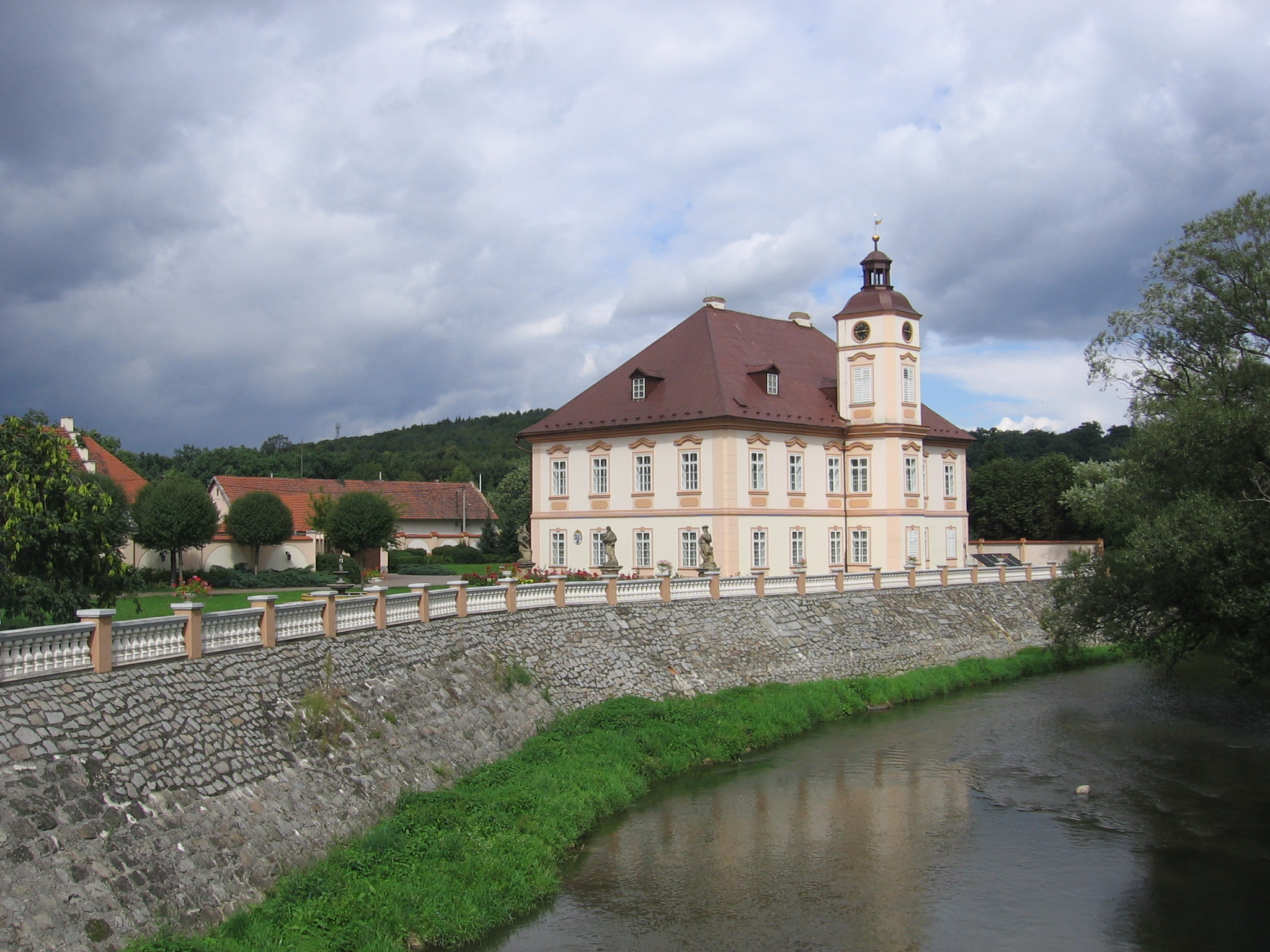
Štěnovice Chateau, Plzeň-South District.

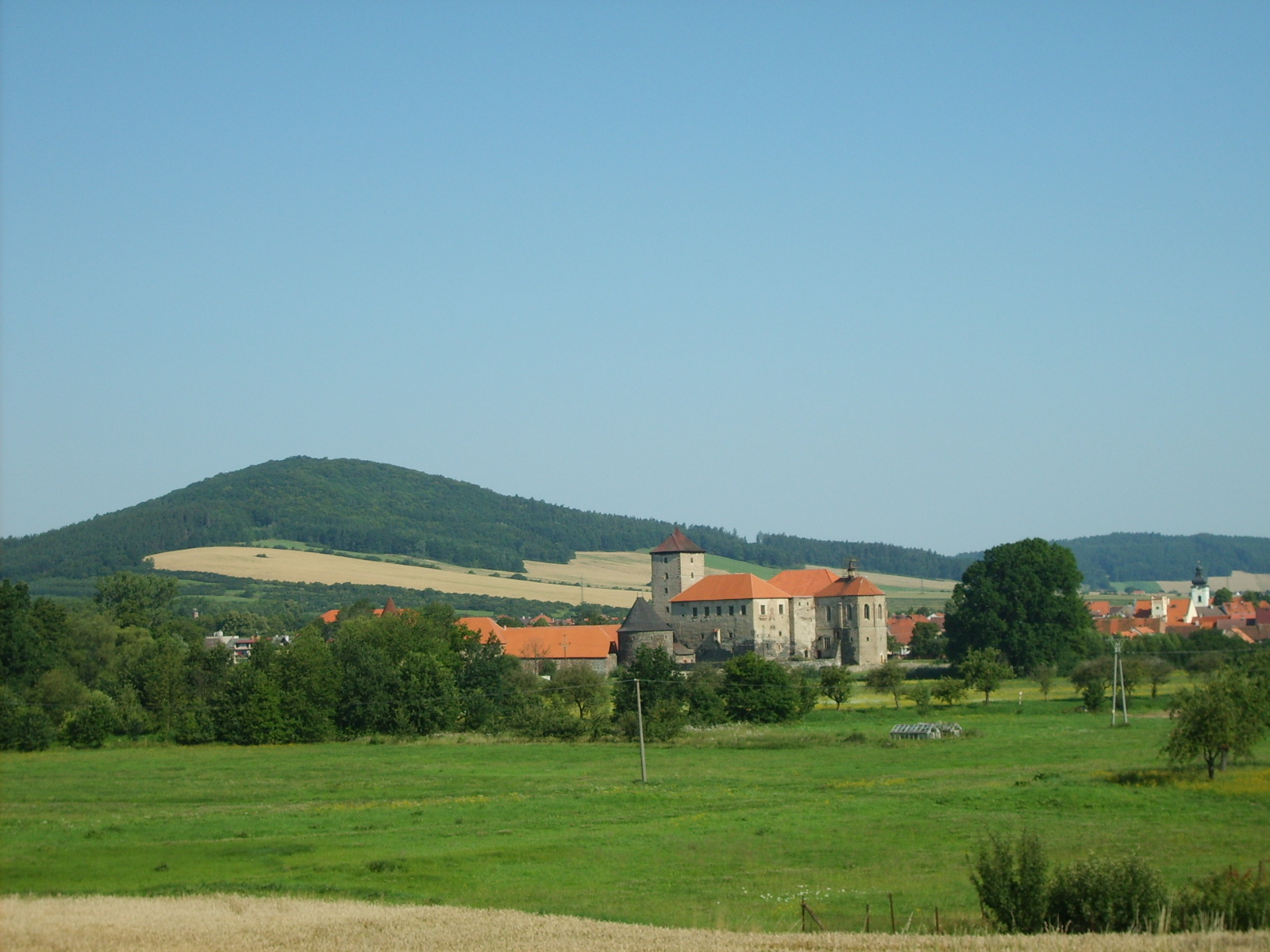
Švihov Castle, Klatovy District.

- Skála Castle
- Soustov Castle
- Spálené Poříčí Chateau
- Starý Herštejn Castle
- Starý Smolivec Chateau
- Strašice Castle
- Strašná skála Castle
- Svatovítský zámek Chateau
- Svinná Chateau
- Svojšín Chateau
- Sychrov Castle
- Šelmberk Castle
- Šontál Castle
- Štěnovice Chateau
- Šťáhlavy Chateau
- Švihov Castle

== T ==
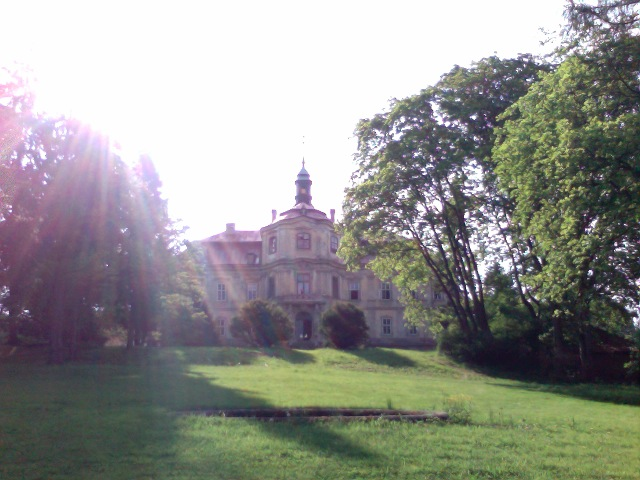
Trpísty Chateau, Tachov District.

- Tachov Chateau
- Terešov Chateau
- Tetětice Chateau
- Tisová Chateau
- Trpísty Chateau
- Třebel Castle
- Týnec Chateau

== U ==
- Ujčín Chateau
- Újezd Chateau
- Újezdec Chateau, Mochtín
- Úlice Chateau

== V ==
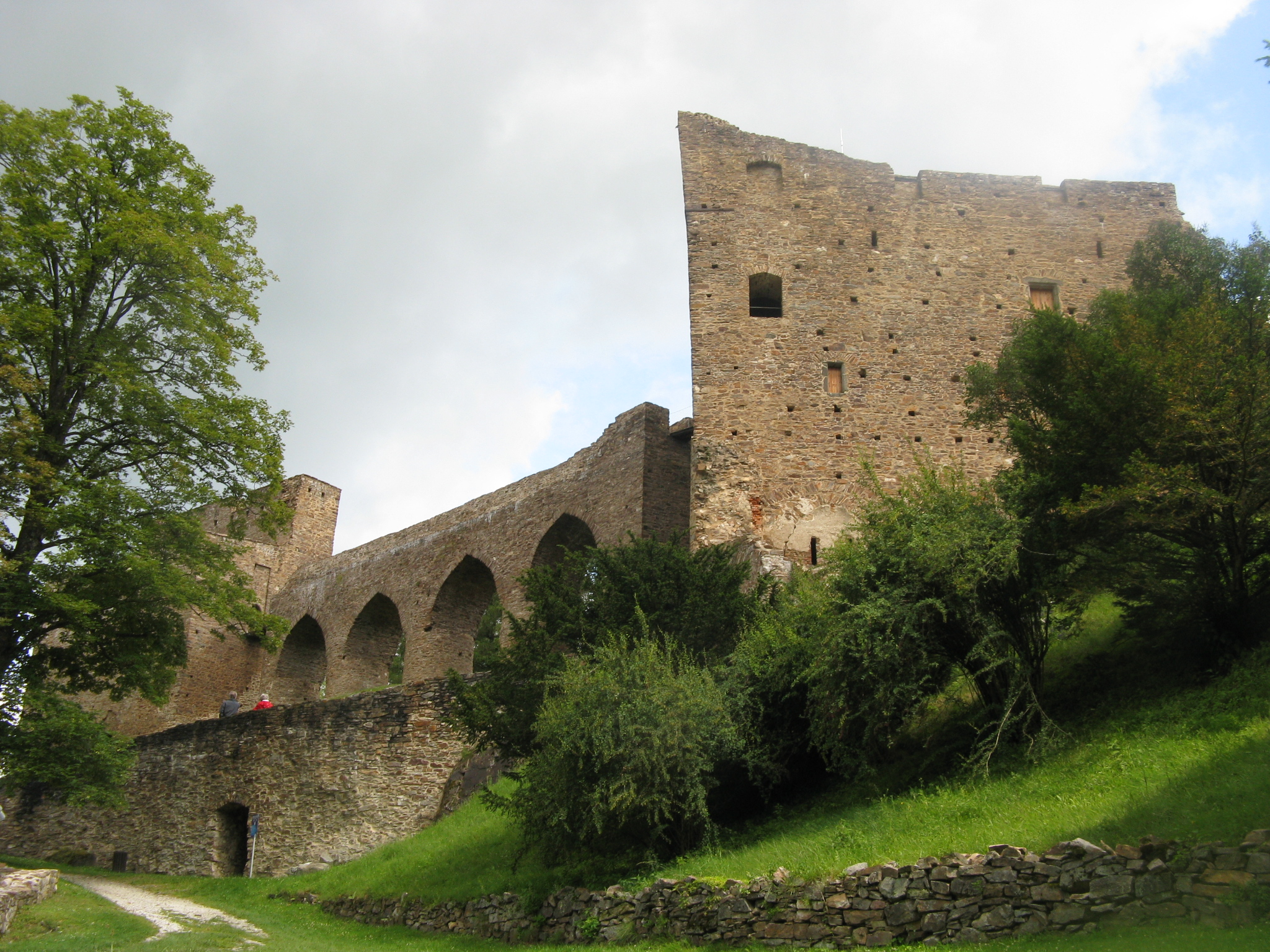
Velhartice Castle, Klatovy District.

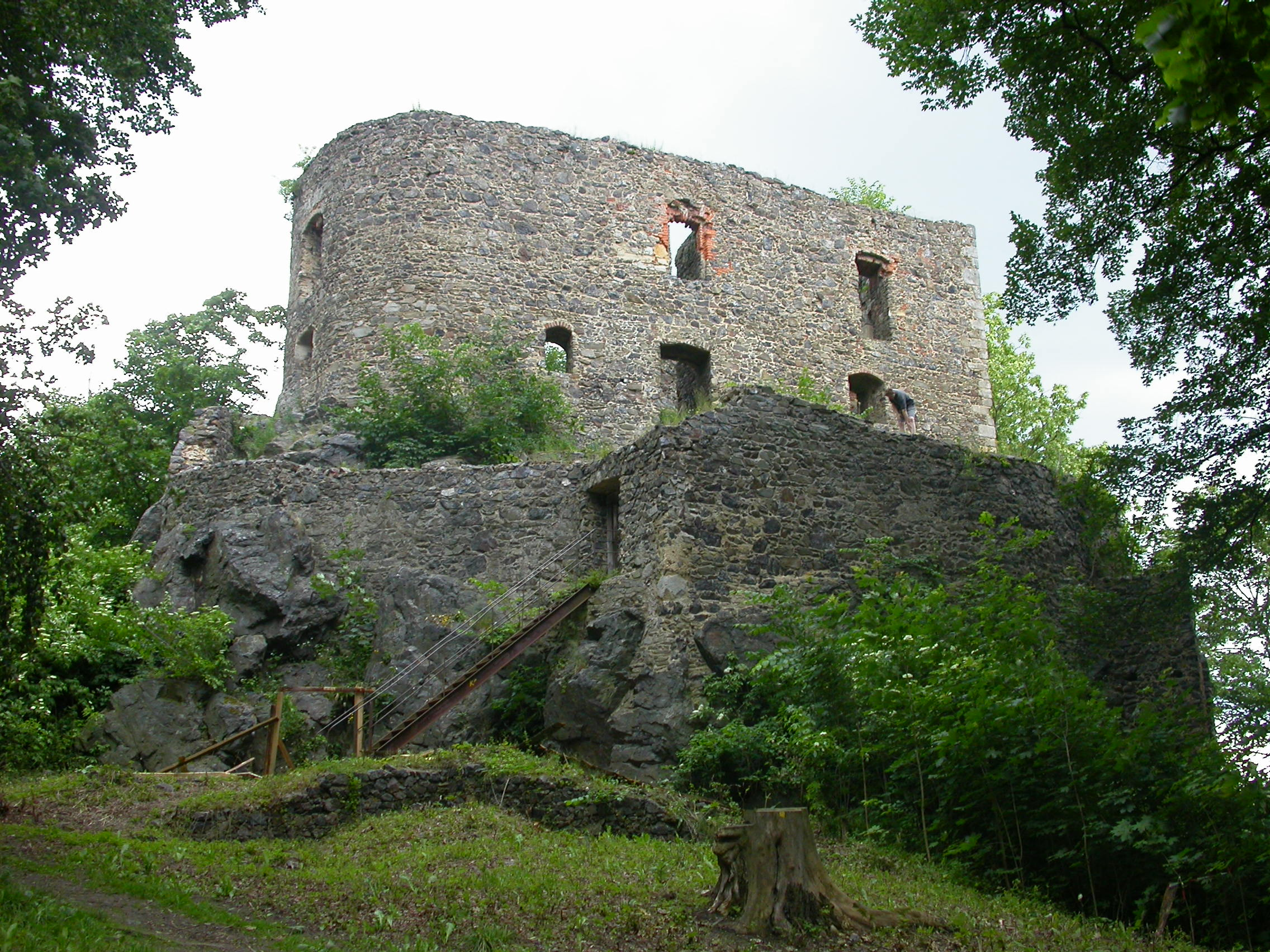
Vlčtejn Castle, Plzeň-South District.

- Vatětice Chateau
- Velhartice Castle
- Veselí Chateau
- Věžka Castle
- Vimberk Castle
- Vlčtejn Castle
- Volfštejn Castle
- Vrtba Castle
- Všeruby Castle

== Z ==
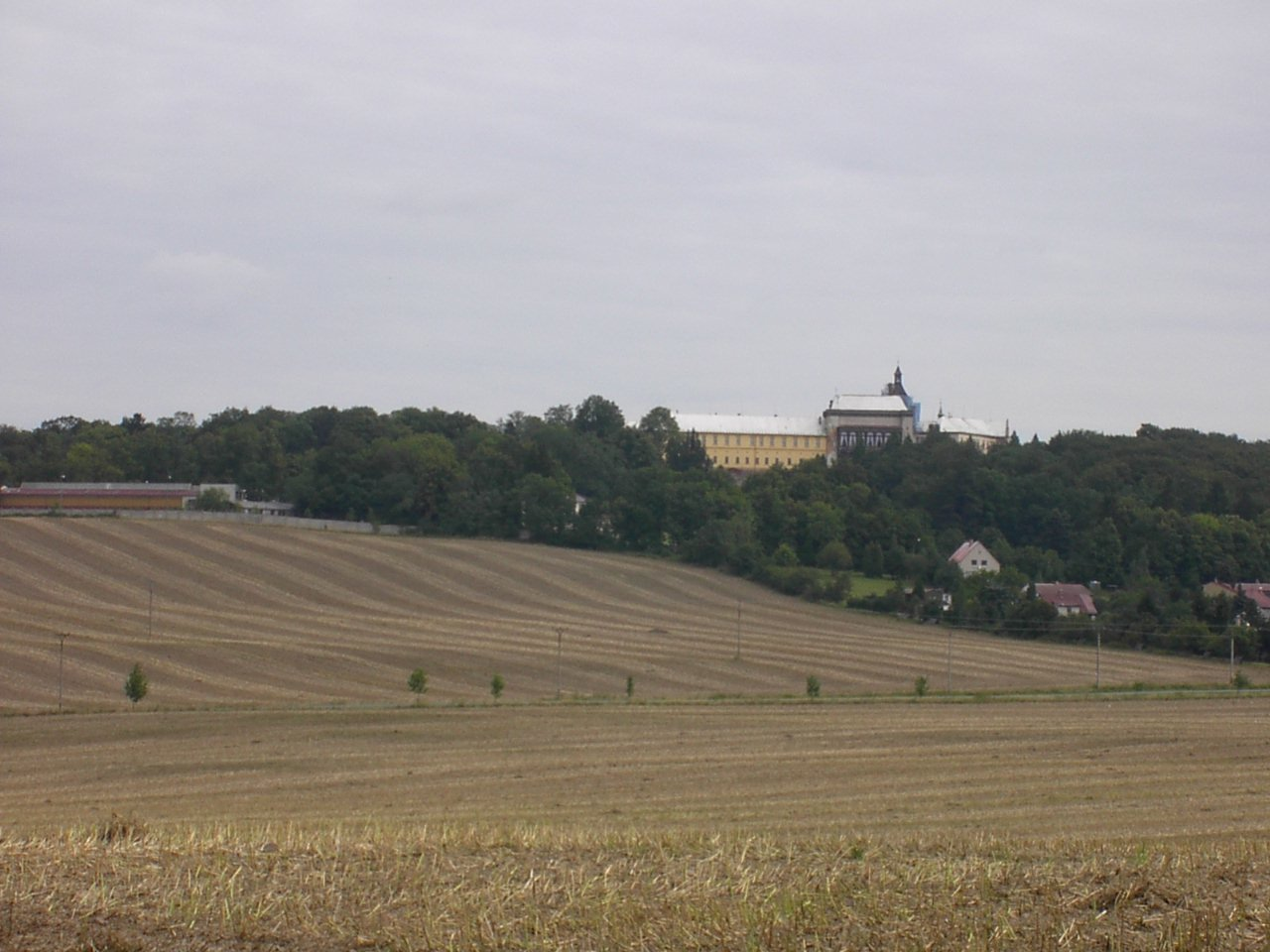
Zbiroh Chateau, Rokycany District.

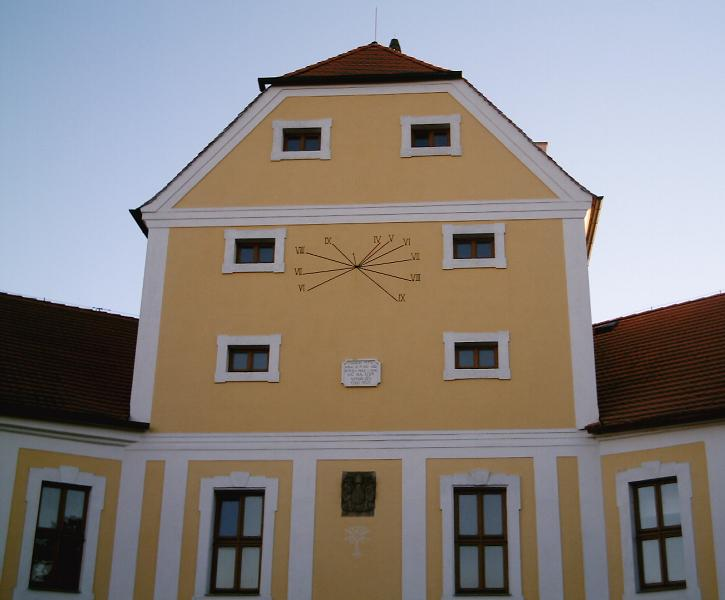
Žihle Chateau, Plzeň-North District.

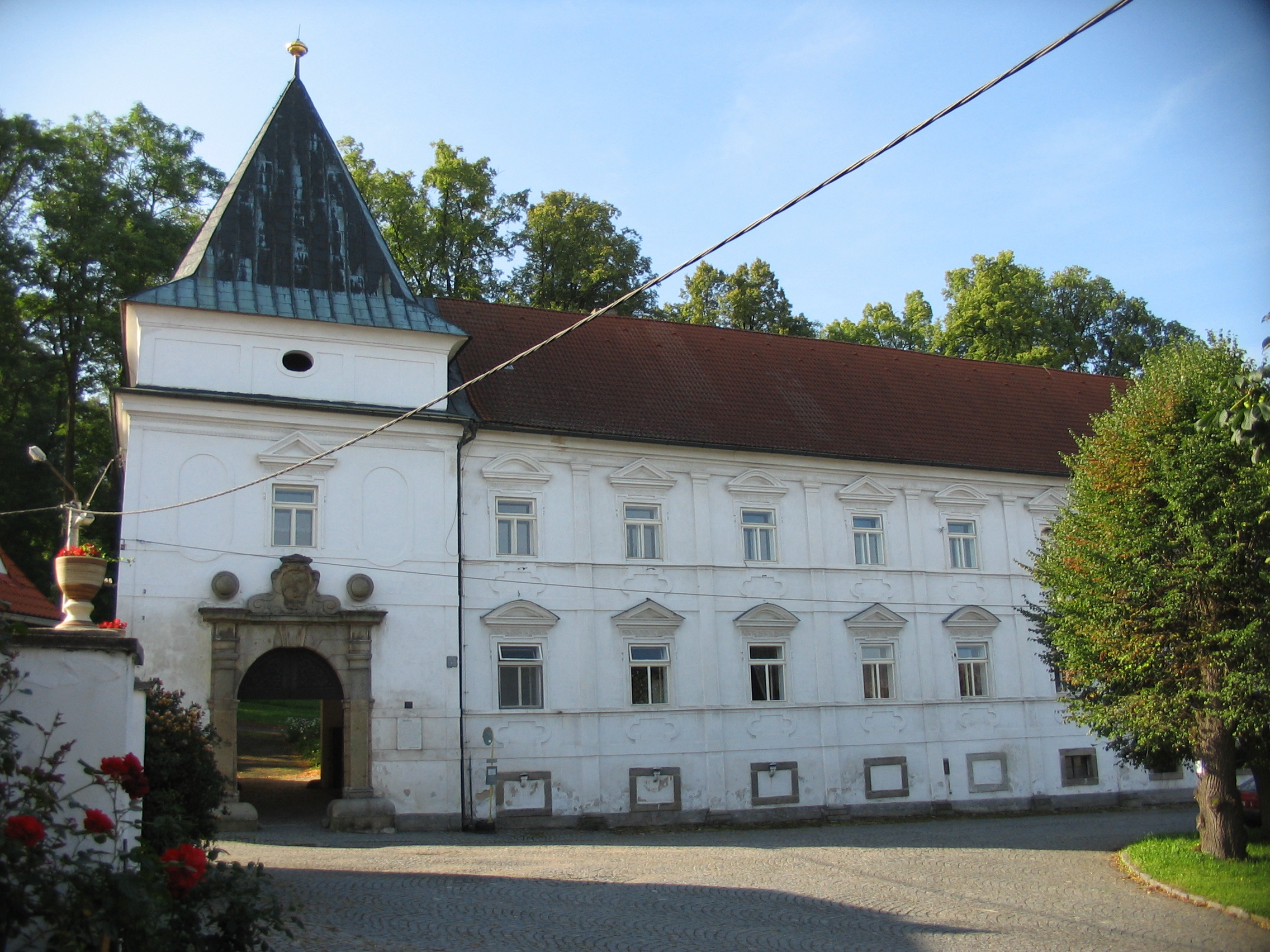
Žihobce Chateau, Klatovy District.

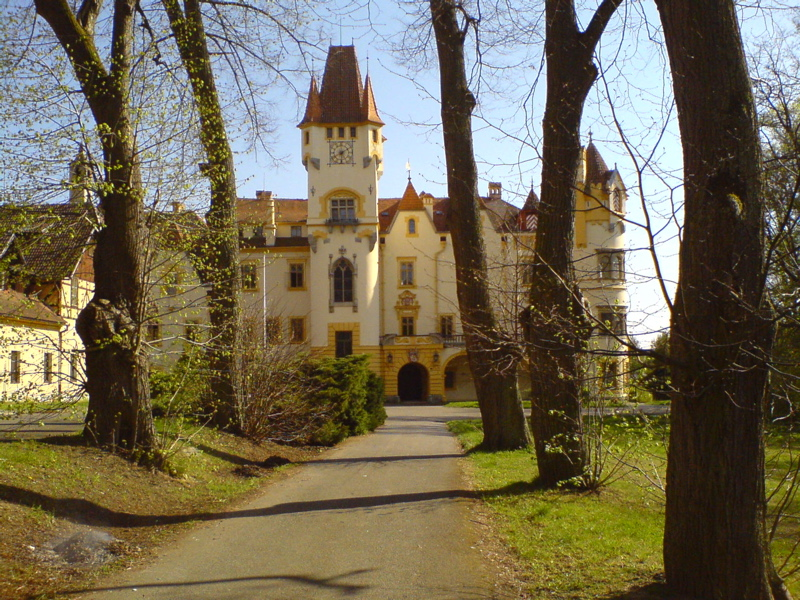
Žinkovy Chateau, Plzeň-South District.

- Záluží Chateau
- Zbiroh Chateau
- Zelená Hora Chateau
- Zvíkovec Chateau
- Ždánov Chateau
- Železná Ruda Chateau
- Žichovice Chateau
- Žihle Chateau
- Žihobce Chateau
- Žinkovy Chateau
- Životice Chateau

== See also ==
- List of castles in the Czech Republic
- List of castles in Europe
- List of castles
