= Kundratice =

- Municipality
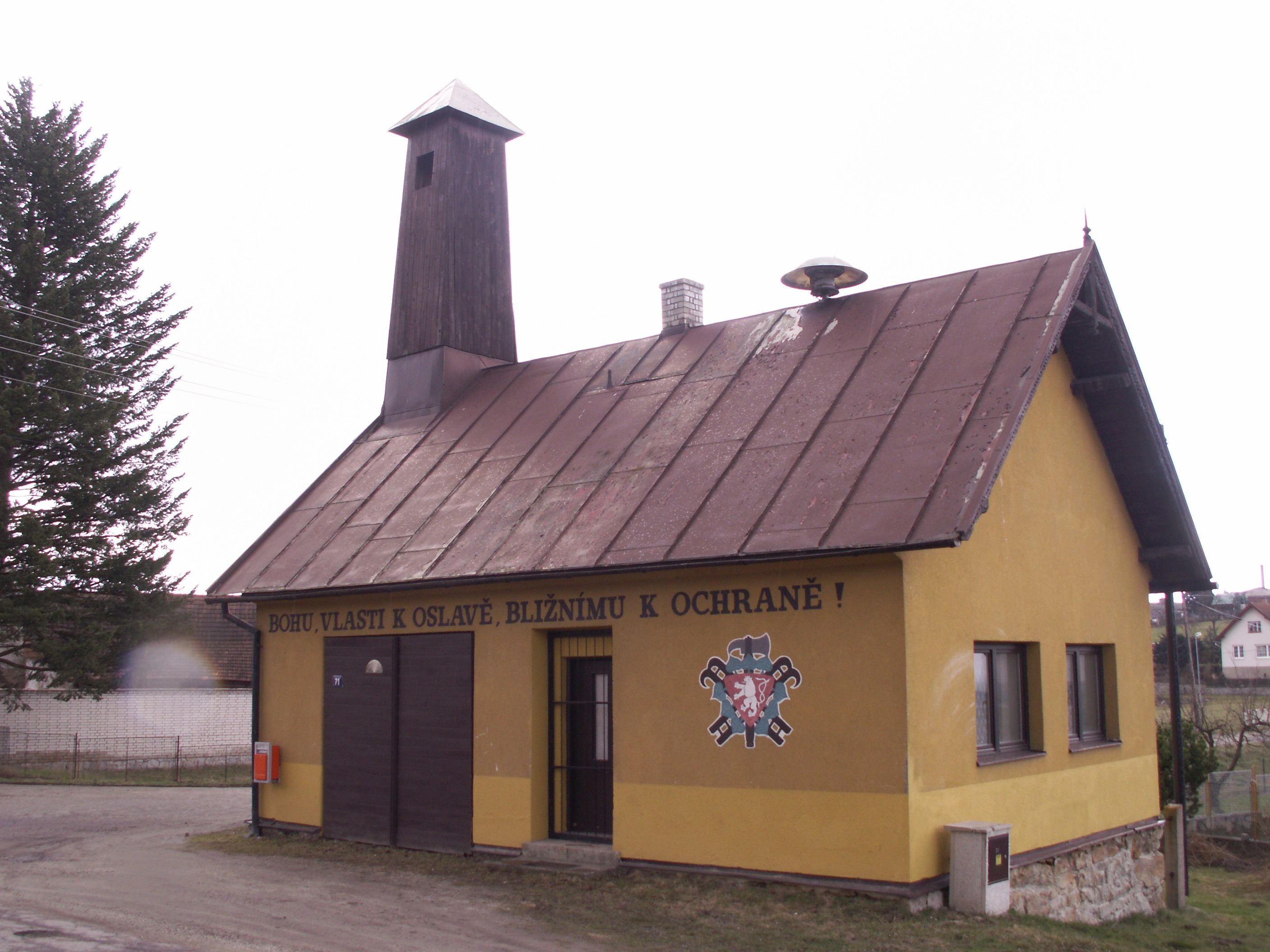
- Firehouse

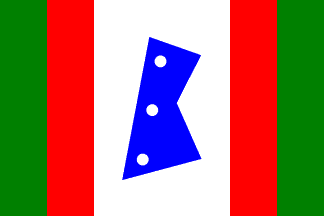
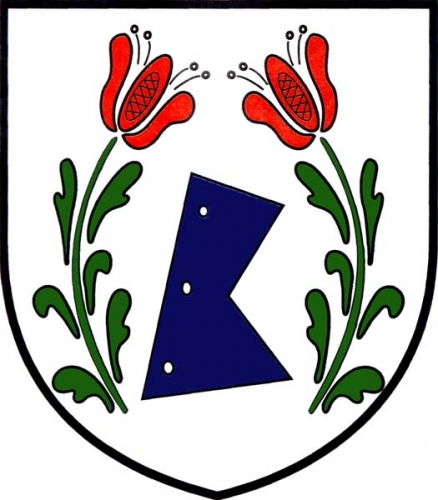
- Flag Coat of arms

- Location in the Czech Republic
- Coordinates: 49°24′9″N 16°8′3″E
- Country: Czech Republic
- Region: Vysočina
- District: Žďár nad Sázavou
- First mentioned: 1358

Area
  - Total: 4.20 km^{2} (1.62 sq mi)
- Elevation: 503 m (1,650 ft)

Population (2026-01-01)
  - Total: 180
  - Density: 43/km^{2} (110/sq mi)
- Time zone: UTC+1 (CET)
  - Summer (DST): UTC+2 (CEST)
- Postal code: 594 51
- Website: www.obec-kundratice.cz

Kundratice is a municipality and village in Žďár nad Sázavou District in the Vysočina Region of the Czech Republic. It has about 200 inhabitants.

Kundratice lies approximately 24 kilometres (15 mi) south-east of Žďár nad Sázavou, 40 km (25 mi) east of Jihlava, and 146 km (91 mi) south-east of Prague.

== Demographics ==
Historical population
Year	Pop.	±%
1869	364	—
1880	331	−9.1%
1890	319	−3.6%
1900	309	−3.1%
1910	289	−6.5%
1921	283	−2.1%
1930	310	+9.5%
1950	260	−16.1%
1961	277	+6.5%
1970	247	−10.8%
1980	236	−4.5%
1991	196	−16.9%
2001	205	+4.6%
2011	199	−2.9%
2021	168	−15.6%
Source: Censuses
