= Budětice =

- Municipality
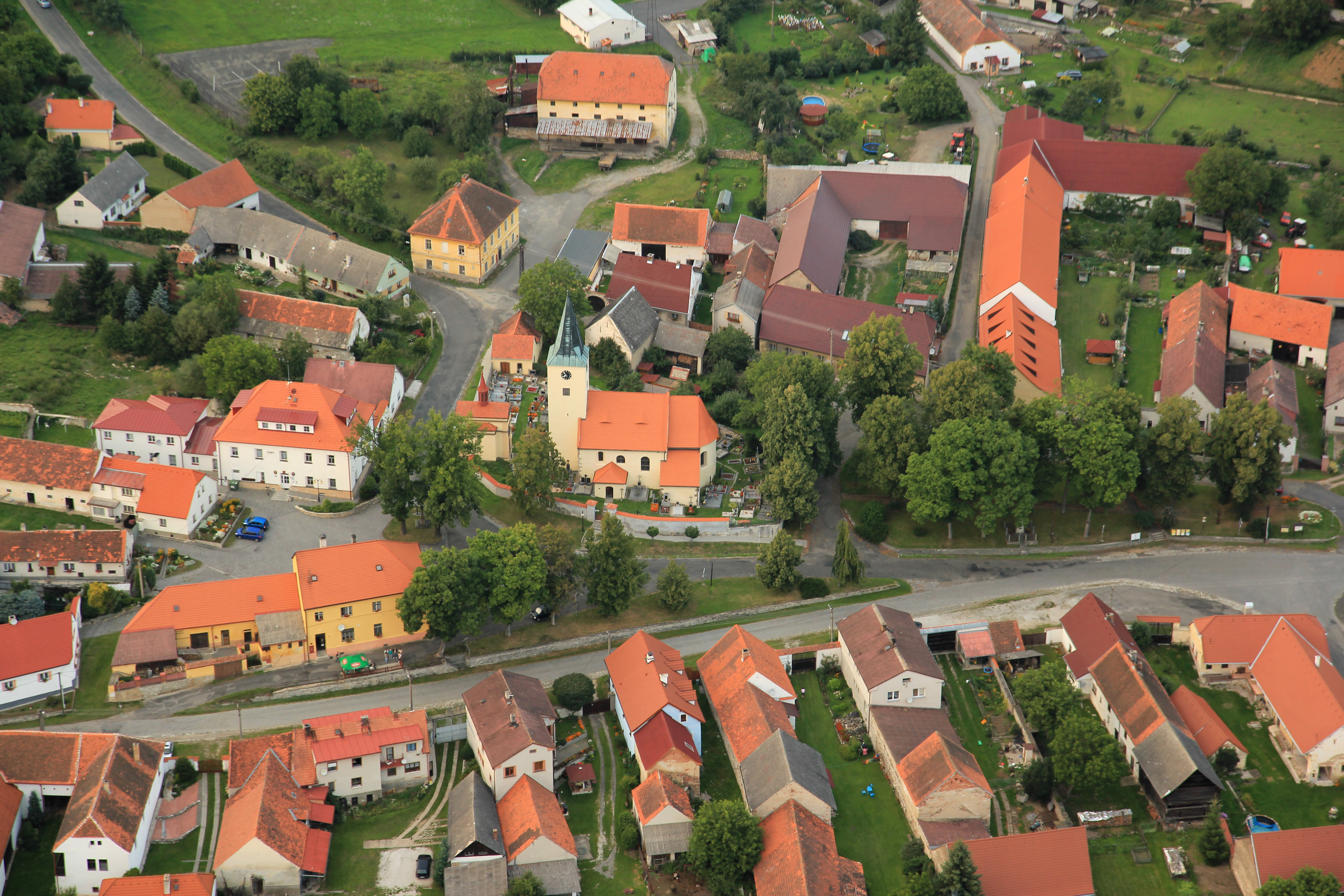
- Centre of Budětice

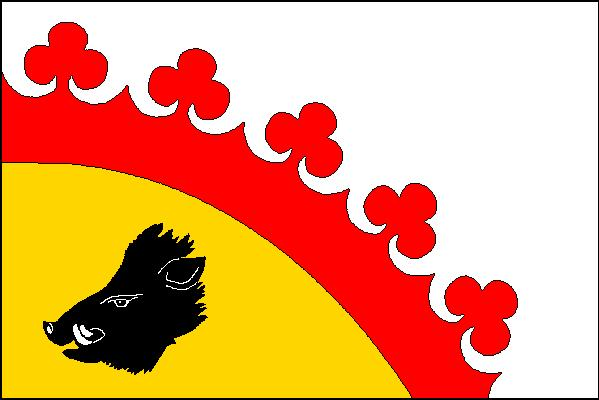
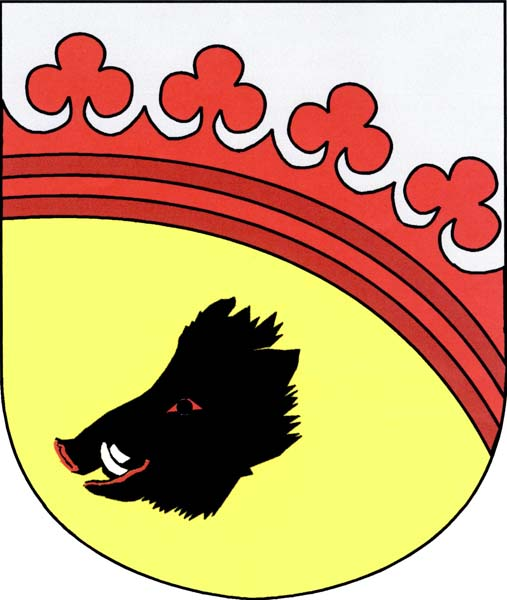
- Flag Coat of arms

- Location in the Czech Republic
- Coordinates: 49°17′0″N 13°35′5″E
- Country: Czech Republic
- Region: Plzeň
- District: Klatovy
- First mentioned: 1290

Area
  - Total: 13.46 km^{2} (5.20 sq mi)
- Elevation: 495 m (1,624 ft)

Population (2026-01-01)
  - Total: 301
  - Density: 22.4/km^{2} (57.9/sq mi)
- Time zone: UTC+1 (CET)
  - Summer (DST): UTC+2 (CEST)
- Postal codes: 341 01, 342 01
- Website: www.obecbudetice.cz

Budětice is a municipality and village in Klatovy District in the Plzeň Region of the Czech Republic. It has about 300 inhabitants.

Budětice lies approximately 25 kilometres (16 mi) south-east of Klatovy, 54 km (34 mi) south of Plzeň, and 108 km (67 mi) south-west of Prague.

== Administrative division ==
Budětice consists of three municipal parts (in brackets population according to the 2021 census):

- Budětice (226)
- Lipová Lhota (14)
- Vlkonice (63)

== Demographics ==
Historical population
Year	Pop.	±%
1869	923	—
1880	934	+1.2%
1890	873	−6.5%
1900	829	−5.0%
1910	831	+0.2%
1921	857	+3.1%
1930	731	−14.7%
1950	511	−30.1%
1961	512	+0.2%
1970	432	−15.6%
1980	373	−13.7%
1991	364	−2.4%
2001	315	−13.5%
2011	273	−13.3%
2021	303	+11.0%
Source: Censuses
