= Vlčtejn =

- Municipality
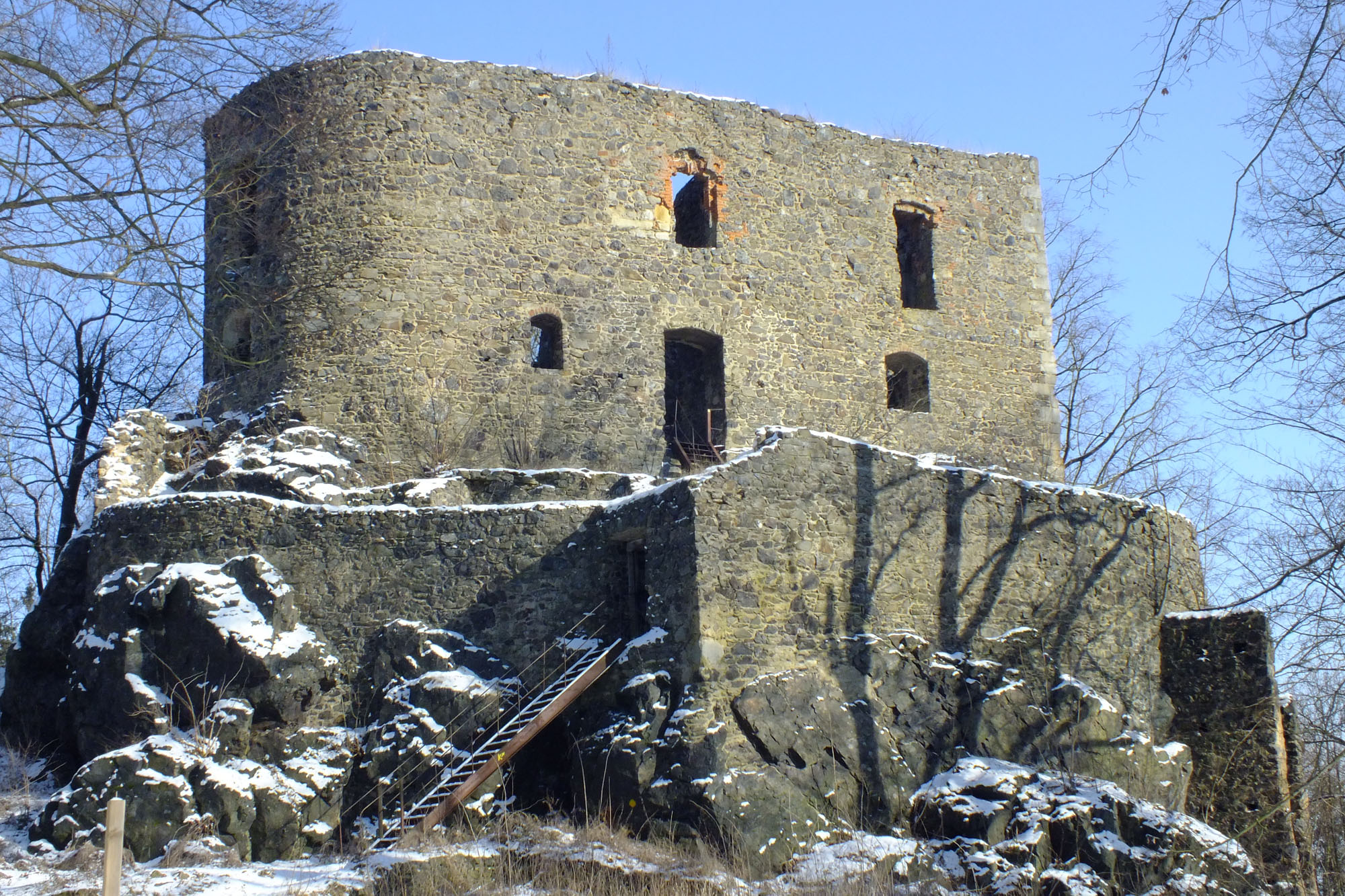
- Ruins of Vlčtejn Castle

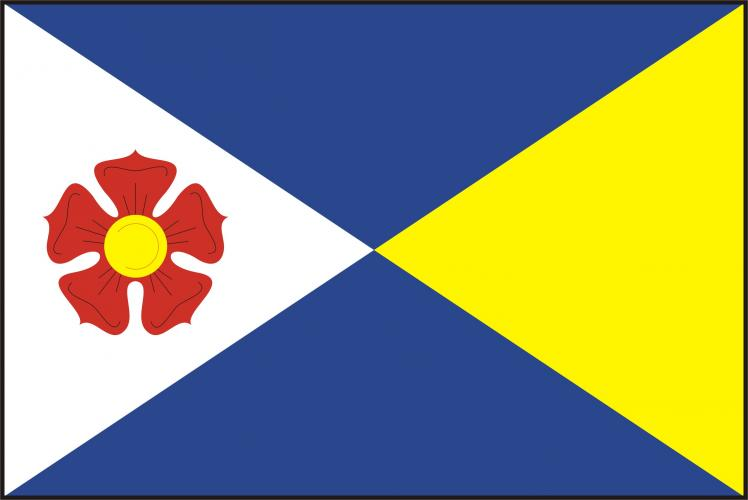
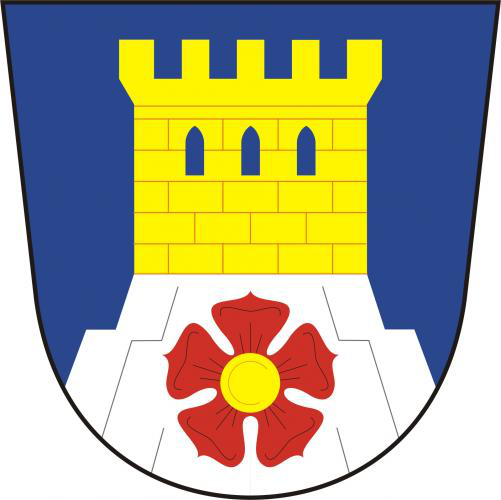
- Flag Coat of arms

- Location in the Czech Republic
- Coordinates: 49°36′53″N 13°29′45″E
- Country: Czech Republic
- Region: Plzeň
- District: Plzeň-South
- First mentioned: 1284

Area
  - Total: 4.01 km^{2} (1.55 sq mi)
- Elevation: 520 m (1,710 ft)

Population (2026-01-01)
  - Total: 93
  - Density: 23/km^{2} (60/sq mi)
- Time zone: UTC+1 (CET)
  - Summer (DST): UTC+2 (CEST)
- Postal code: 332 04
- Website: www.vlctejn.wz.cz

Vlčtejn is a municipality and village in Plzeň-South District in the Plzeň Region of the Czech Republic. It has about 90 inhabitants.

Vlčtejn lies approximately 17 kilometres (11 mi) south-east of Plzeň and 85 km (53 mi) south-west of Prague.

== Administrative division ==
Vlčtejn consists of two municipal parts (in brackets population according to the 2021 census):

- Vlčtejn (69)
- Chlumánky (21)

== Demographics ==
Historical population
Year	Pop.	±%
1869	190	—
1880	208	+9.5%
1890	237	+13.9%
1900	230	−3.0%
1910	199	−13.5%
1921	236	+18.6%
1930	247	+4.7%
1950	175	−29.1%
1961	156	−10.9%
1970	137	−12.2%
1980	104	−24.1%
1991	86	−17.3%
2001	92	+7.0%
2011	104	+13.0%
2021	90	−13.5%
Source: Censuses
