= Roupov =

- Municipality
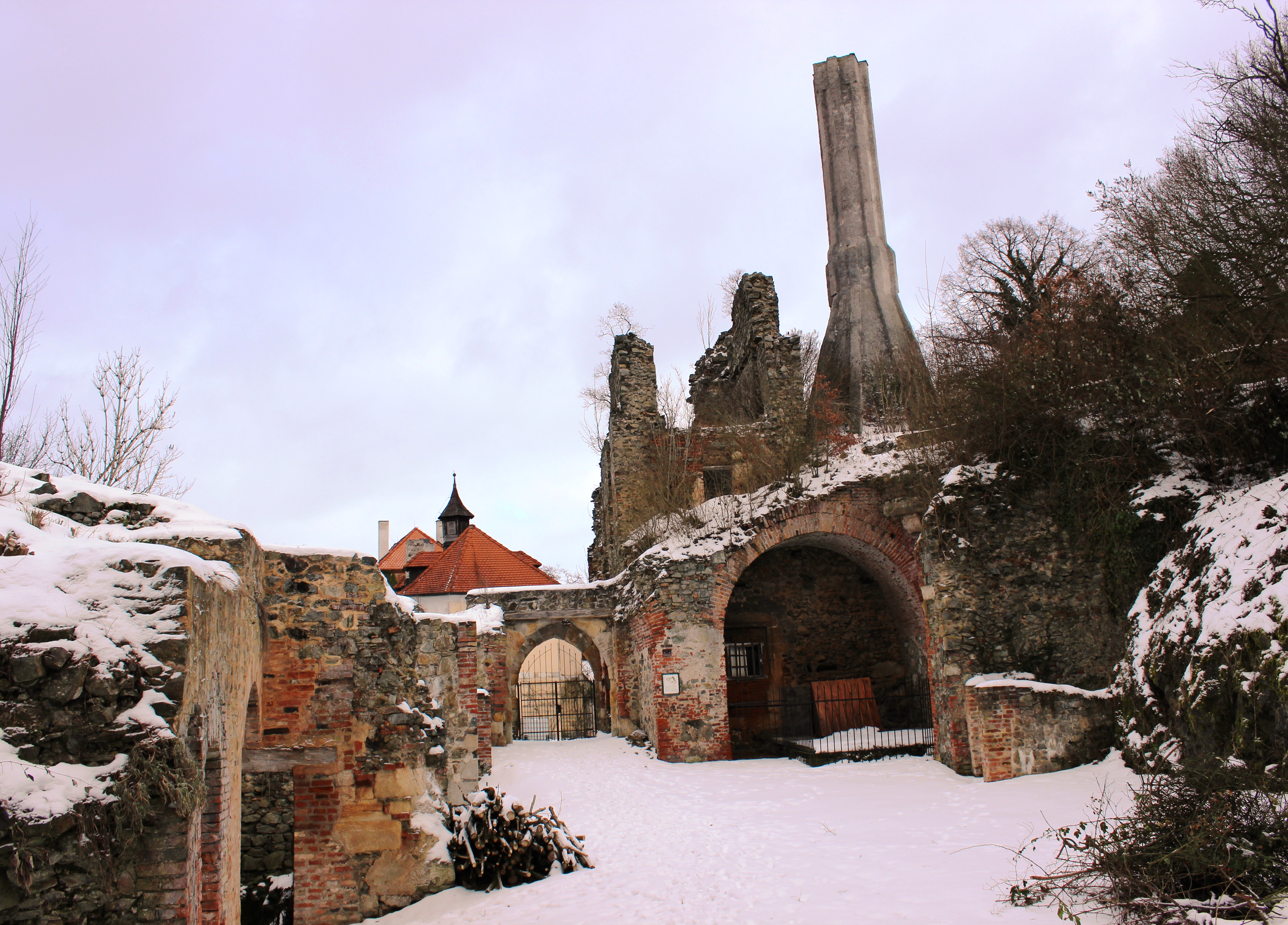
- Ruin of Roupov Castle

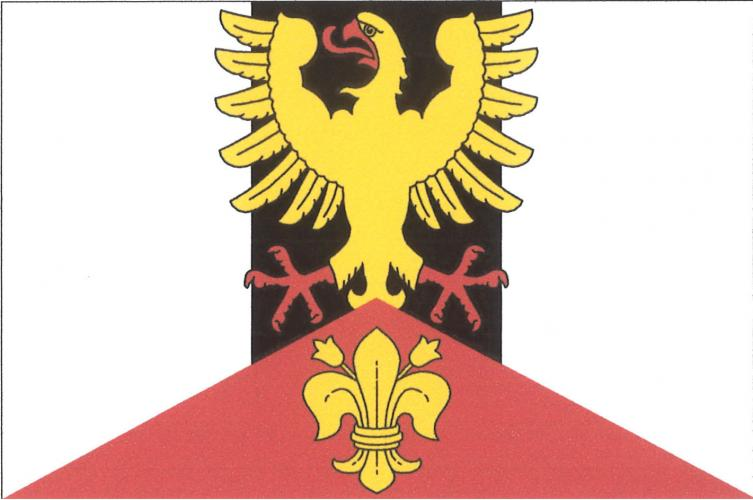
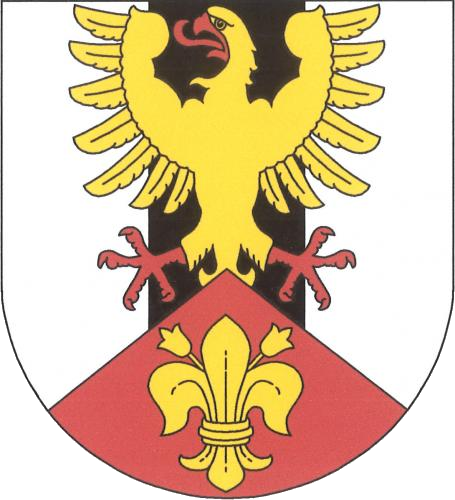
- Flag Coat of arms

- Location in the Czech Republic
- Coordinates: 49°32′19″N 13°14′56″E
- Country: Czech Republic
- Region: Plzeň
- District: Plzeň-South
- First mentioned: 1250

Area
  - Total: 7.08 km^{2} (2.73 sq mi)
- Elevation: 427 m (1,401 ft)

Population (2026-01-01)
  - Total: 278
  - Density: 39.3/km^{2} (102/sq mi)
- Time zone: UTC+1 (CET)
  - Summer (DST): UTC+2 (CEST)
- Postal code: 334 53
- Website: www.obec-roupov.cz

Roupov is a municipality and village in Plzeň-South District in the Plzeň Region of the Czech Republic. It has about 300 inhabitants.

Roupov lies approximately 25 kilometres (16 mi) south of Plzeň and 104 km (65 mi) south-west of Prague.

== Demographics ==
Historical population
| Year | Pop. | ±% |
|---|---|---|
| 1869 | 536 | — |
| 1880 | 588 | +9.7% |
| 1890 | 544 | −7.5% |
| 1900 | 569 | +4.6% |
| 1910 | 637 | +12.0% |
| 1921 | 584 | −8.3% |
| 1930 | 606 | +3.8% |
| 1950 | 415 | −31.5% |
| 1961 | 421 | +1.4% |
| 1970 | 374 | −11.2% |
| 1980 | 319 | −14.7% |
| 1991 | 253 | −20.7% |
| 2001 | 252 | −0.4% |
| 2011 | 257 | +2.0% |
| 2021 | 271 | +5.4% |
Source: Censuses
