= Červené Poříčí =

- Municipality
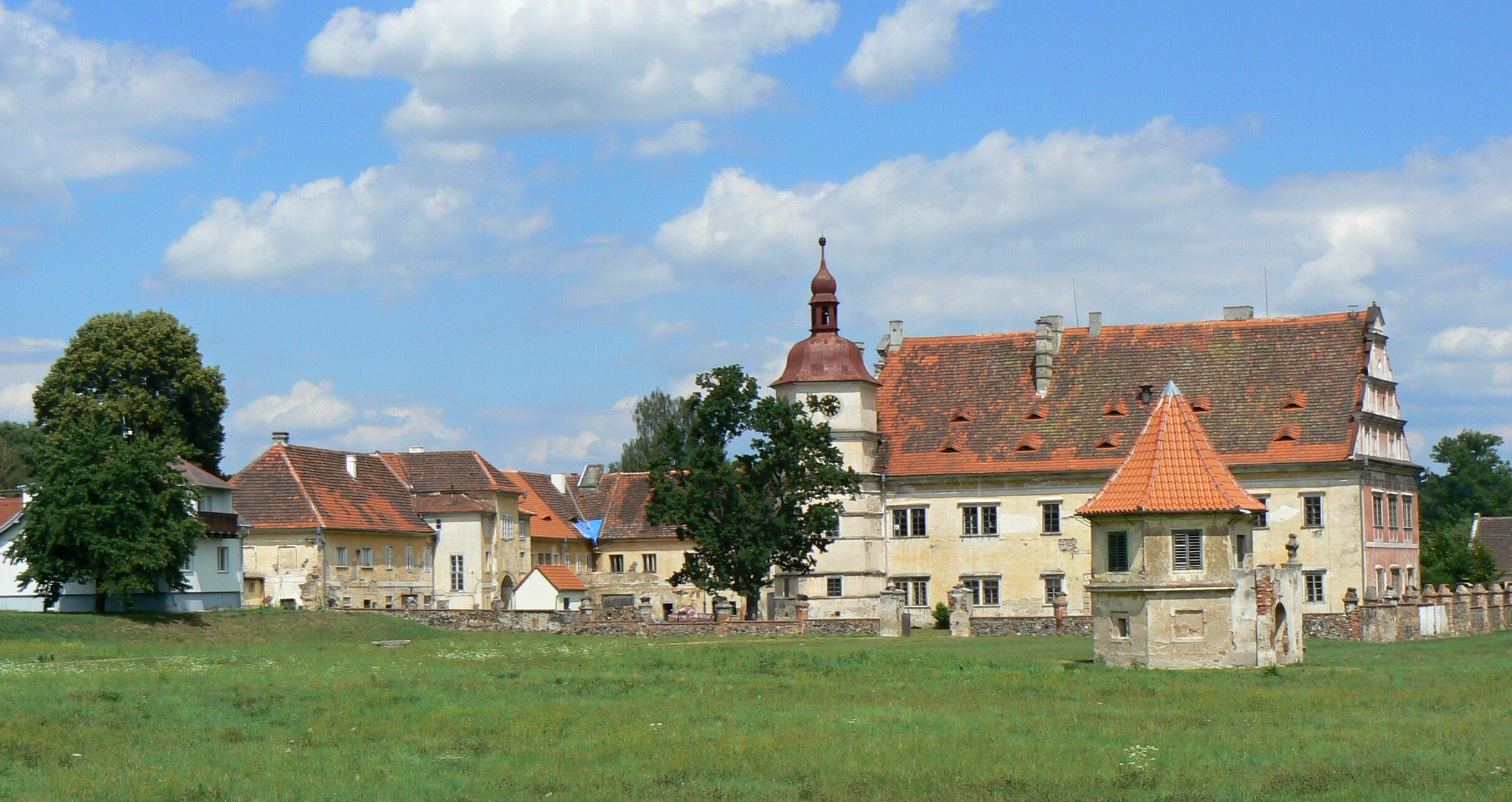
- Červené Poříčí Castle

- Flag Coat of arms

- Location in the Czech Republic
- Coordinates: 49°30′7″N 13°17′40″E
- Country: Czech Republic
- Region: Plzeň
- District: Klatovy
- First mentioned: 1318

Area
  - Total: 4.83 km^{2} (1.86 sq mi)
- Elevation: 372 m (1,220 ft)

Population (2026-01-01)
  - Total: 235
  - Density: 48.7/km^{2} (126/sq mi)
- Time zone: UTC+1 (CET)
  - Summer (DST): UTC+2 (CEST)
- Postal code: 340 12
- Website: www.cerveneporici.cz

Červené Poříčí is a municipality and village in Klatovy District in the Plzeň Region of the Czech Republic. It has about 200 inhabitants.

Červené Poříčí lies approximately 12 kilometres (7 mi) north of Klatovy, 29 km (18 mi) south of Plzeň, and 104 km (65 mi) south-west of Prague.

== Demographics ==
Historical population
Year	Pop.	±%
1869	467	—
1880	523	+12.0%
1890	456	−12.8%
1900	473	+3.7%
1910	505	+6.8%
1921	494	−2.2%
1930	492	−0.4%
1950	401	−18.5%
1961	395	−1.5%
1970	342	−13.4%
1980	314	−8.2%
1991	257	−18.2%
2001	223	−13.2%
2011	234	+4.9%
2021	233	−0.4%
Source: Censuses
