= Osvračín =

- Municipality
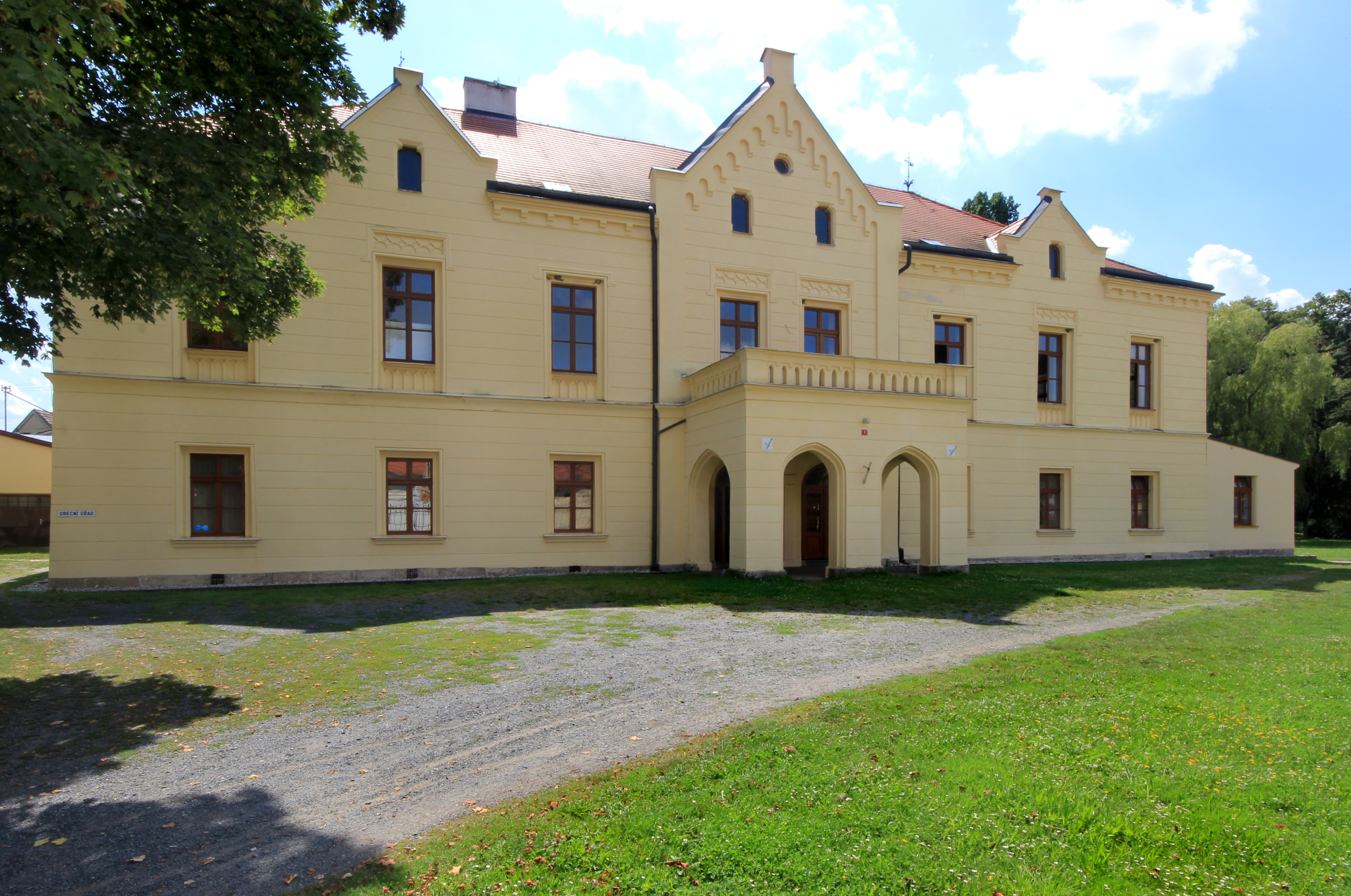
- Osvračín Castle

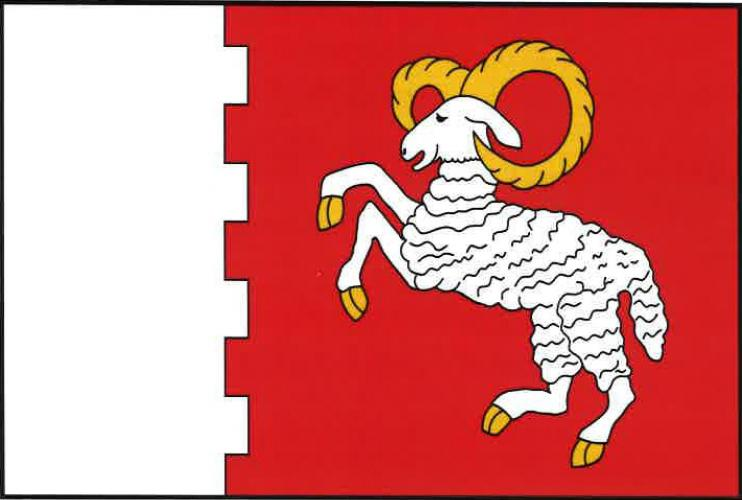
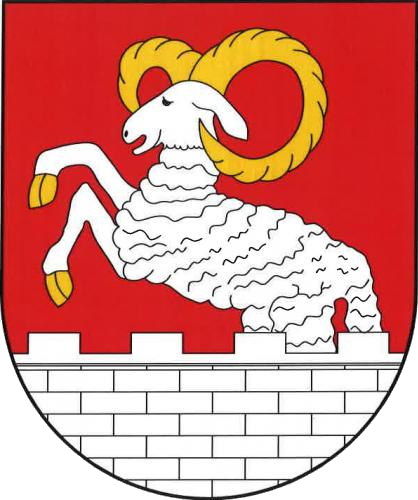
- Flag Coat of arms

- Location in the Czech Republic
- Coordinates: 49°30′48″N 13°2′49″E
- Country: Czech Republic
- Region: Plzeň
- District: Domažlice
- First mentioned: 1289

Area
  - Total: 11.24 km^{2} (4.34 sq mi)
- Elevation: 373 m (1,224 ft)

Population (2026-01-01)
  - Total: 676
  - Density: 60.1/km^{2} (156/sq mi)
- Time zone: UTC+1 (CET)
  - Summer (DST): UTC+2 (CEST)
- Postal code: 345 61
- Website: www.osvracin.cz

Osvračín is a municipality and village in Domažlice District in the Plzeň Region of the Czech Republic. It has about 700 inhabitants.

Osvračín lies approximately 12 kilometres (7 mi) north-east of Domažlice, 36 km (22 mi) south-west of Plzeň, and 119 km (74 mi) south-west of Prague.

== Administrative division ==
Osvračín consists of three municipal parts (in brackets population according to the 2021 census):

- Osvračín (600)
- Dohalice (6)
- Mimov (30)

== Demographics ==
Historical population
Year	Pop.	±%
1869	741	—
1880	774	+4.5%
1890	804	+3.9%
1900	827	+2.9%
1910	938	+13.4%
1921	962	+2.6%
1930	889	−7.6%
1950	637	−28.3%
1961	662	+3.9%
1970	651	−1.7%
1980	561	−13.8%
1991	501	−10.7%
2001	530	+5.8%
2011	562	+6.0%
2021	636	+13.2%
Source: Censuses
