= Ždánov =

- Municipality
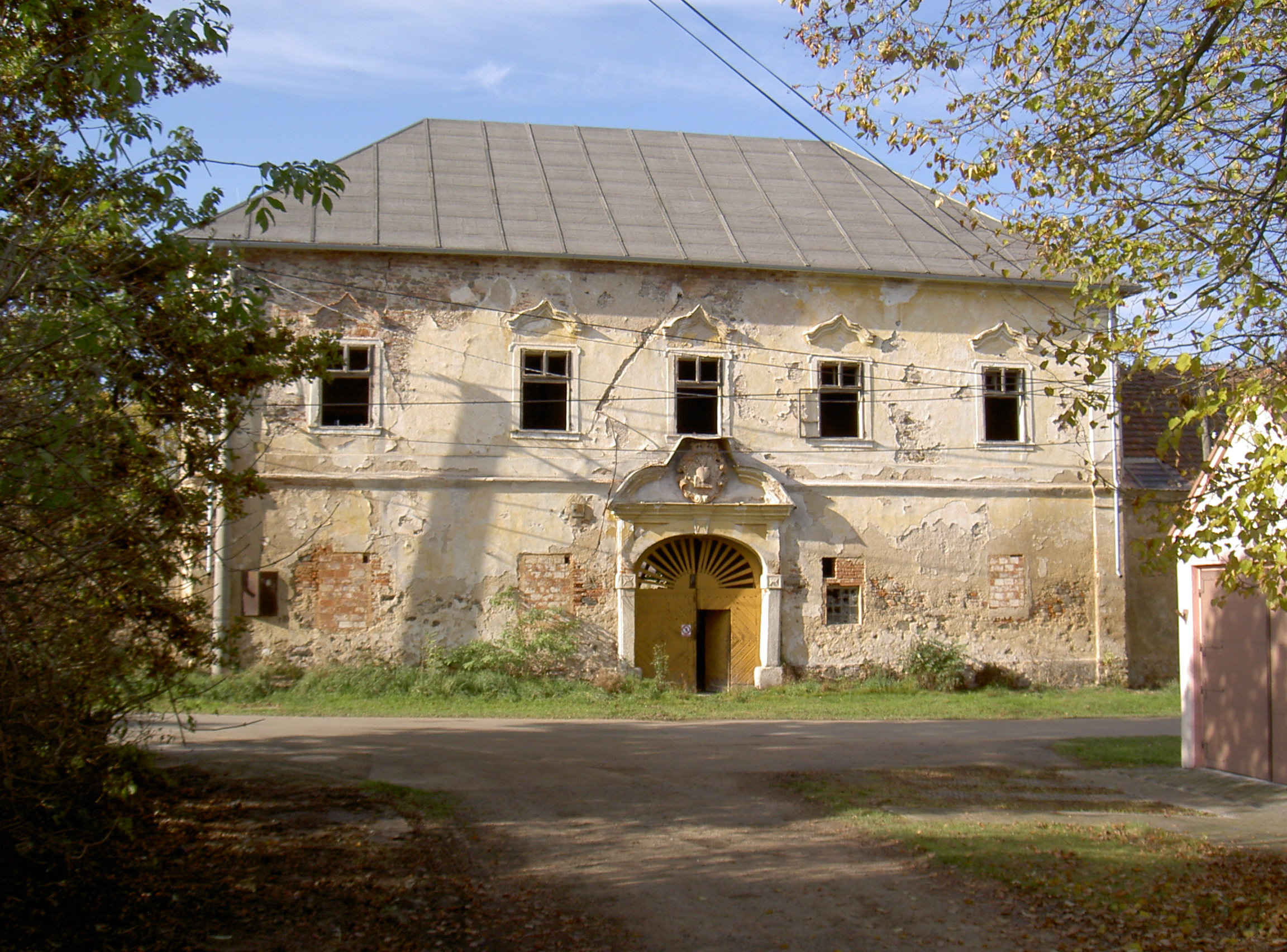
- Ždánov Castle

- Location in the Czech Republic
- Coordinates: 49°27′40″N 12°51′16″E
- Country: Czech Republic
- Region: Plzeň
- District: Domažlice
- First mentioned: 1579

Area
  - Total: 3.37 km^{2} (1.30 sq mi)
- Elevation: 432 m (1,417 ft)

Population (2026-01-01)
  - Total: 150
  - Density: 45/km^{2} (120/sq mi)
- Time zone: UTC+1 (CET)
  - Summer (DST): UTC+2 (CEST)
- Postal code: 344 01
- Website: www.zdanov.cz

Ždánov is a municipality and village in Domažlice District in the Plzeň Region of the Czech Republic. It has about 200 inhabitants.

Ždánov lies approximately 7 kilometres (4 mi) north-west of Domažlice, 49 km (30 mi) south-west of Plzeň, and 133 km (83 mi) south-west of Prague.

== Demographics ==
Historical population
Year	Pop.	±%
1869	298	—
1880	278	−6.7%
1890	263	−5.4%
1900	290	+10.3%
1910	326	+12.4%
1921	340	+4.3%
1930	275	−19.1%
1950	161	−41.5%
1961	168	+4.3%
1970	127	−24.4%
1980	107	−15.7%
1991	109	+1.9%
2001	119	+9.2%
2011	147	+23.5%
2021	149	+1.4%
Source: Censuses
