= Zderaz =

Zderaz may refer to places in the Czech Republic:

- Zderaz (Chrudim District), a municipality and village in the Pardubice Region
- Zderaz, a village and part of Biřkov in the Plzeň Region
- Zderaz, a village and part of Kolešovice in the Central Bohemian Region
- Zderaz, an extinct village historically known for Zderaz Monastery, today New Town, Prague
