= Nezamyslice (Klatovy District) =

- Municipality
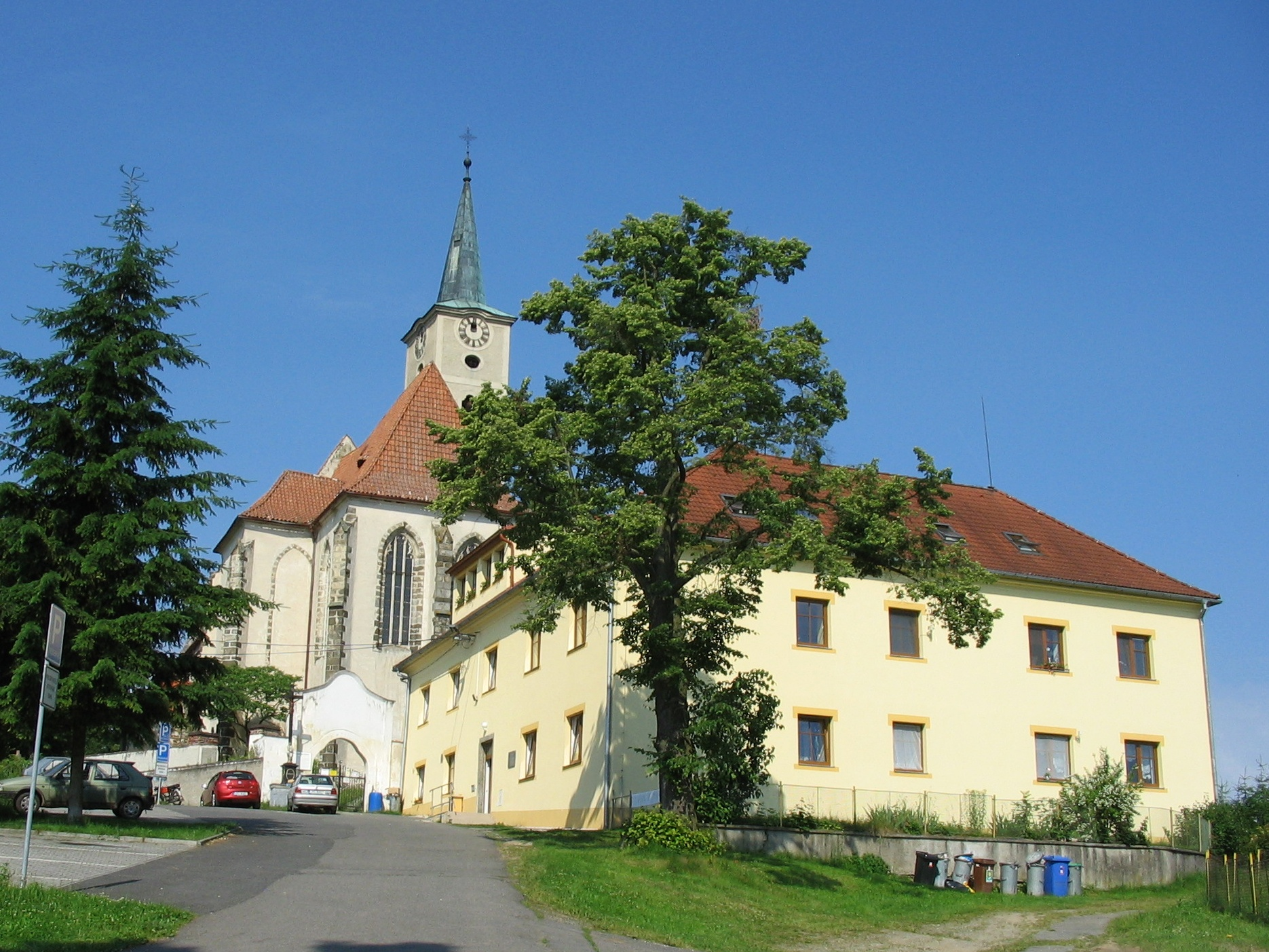
- Church of the Assumption of the Virgin Mary

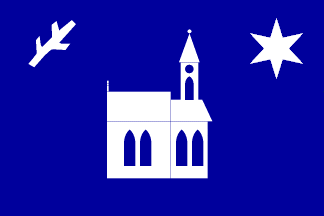
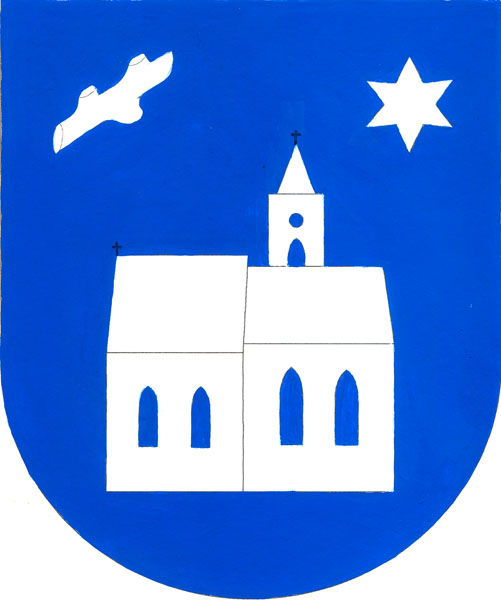
- Flag Coat of arms

- Location in the Czech Republic
- Coordinates: 49°15′45″N 13°40′30″E
- Country: Czech Republic
- Region: Plzeň
- District: Klatovy
- First mentioned: 1045

Area
  - Total: 7.09 km^{2} (2.74 sq mi)
- Elevation: 488 m (1,601 ft)

Population (2026-01-01)
  - Total: 208
  - Density: 29.3/km^{2} (76.0/sq mi)
- Time zone: UTC+1 (CET)
  - Summer (DST): UTC+2 (CEST)
- Postal code: 342 01
- Website: www.ounezamyslice.cz

Nezamyslice is a municipality and village in Klatovy District in the Plzeň Region of the Czech Republic. It has about 200 inhabitants.

Nezamyslice lies approximately 32 kilometres (20 mi) south-east of Klatovy, 58 km (36 mi) south of Plzeň, and 107 km (66 mi) south-west of Prague.

== Demographics ==
Historical population
Year	Pop.	±%
1869	534	—
1880	561	+5.1%
1890	534	−4.8%
1900	484	−9.4%
1910	472	−2.5%
1921	460	−2.5%
1930	412	−10.4%
1950	339	−17.7%
1961	336	−0.9%
1970	286	−14.9%
1980	238	−16.8%
1991	252	+5.9%
2001	204	−19.0%
2011	214	+4.9%
2021	208	−2.8%
Source: Censuses
