= Dražovice =

Dražovice may refer to places in the Czech Republic:

- Dražovice (Klatovy District), a municipality and village in the Plzeň Region
- Dražovice (Vyškov District), a municipality and village in the South Moravian Region
