= Břežany (Klatovy District) =

- Municipality
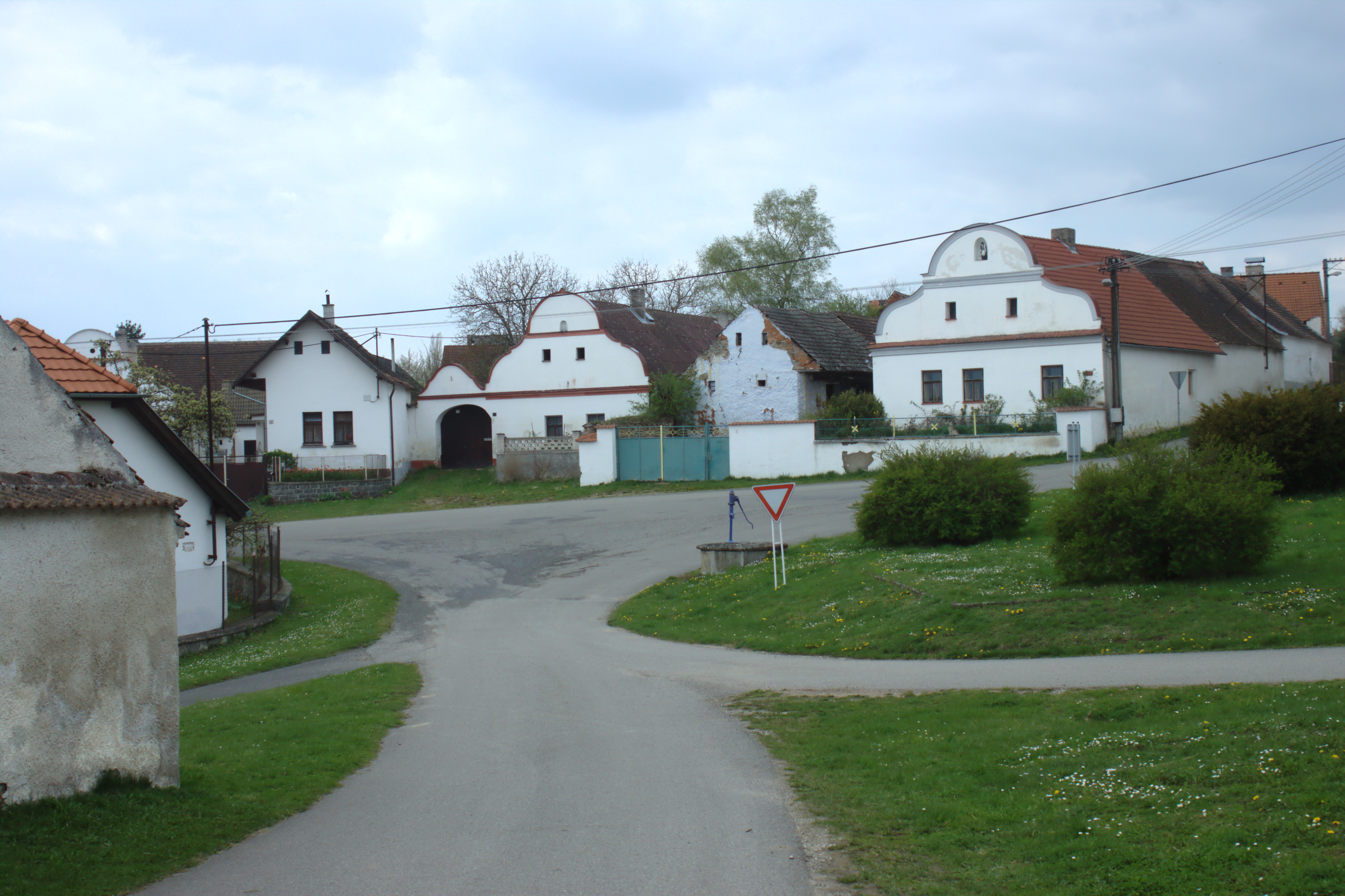
- Centre of Břežany

- Flag Coat of arms

- Location in the Czech Republic
- Coordinates: 49°20′56″N 13°37′3″E
- Country: Czech Republic
- Region: Plzeň
- District: Klatovy
- First mentioned: 1319

Area
  - Total: 10.44 km^{2} (4.03 sq mi)
- Elevation: 488 m (1,601 ft)

Population (2026-01-01)
  - Total: 210
  - Density: 20/km^{2} (52/sq mi)
- Time zone: UTC+1 (CET)
  - Summer (DST): UTC+2 (CEST)
- Postal code: 341 01
- Website: www.brezany-obec.cz

Břežany is a municipality and village in Klatovy District in the Plzeň Region of the Czech Republic. It has about 200 inhabitants. The historic centre of the village is well preserved and is protected as a village monument zone.

Břežany lies approximately 25 kilometres (16 mi) east of Klatovy, 48 km (30 mi) south of Plzeň, and 101 km (63 mi) south-west of Prague.

== Demographics ==
Historical population
Year	Pop.	±%
1869	668	—
1880	717	+7.3%
1890	686	−4.3%
1900	669	−2.5%
1910	663	−0.9%
1921	638	−3.8%
1930	577	−9.6%
1950	395	−31.5%
1961	362	−8.4%
1970	324	−10.5%
1980	235	−27.5%
1991	182	−22.6%
2001	155	−14.8%
2011	180	+16.1%
2021	190	+5.6%
Source: Censuses
