= Vřeskovice =

- Municipality
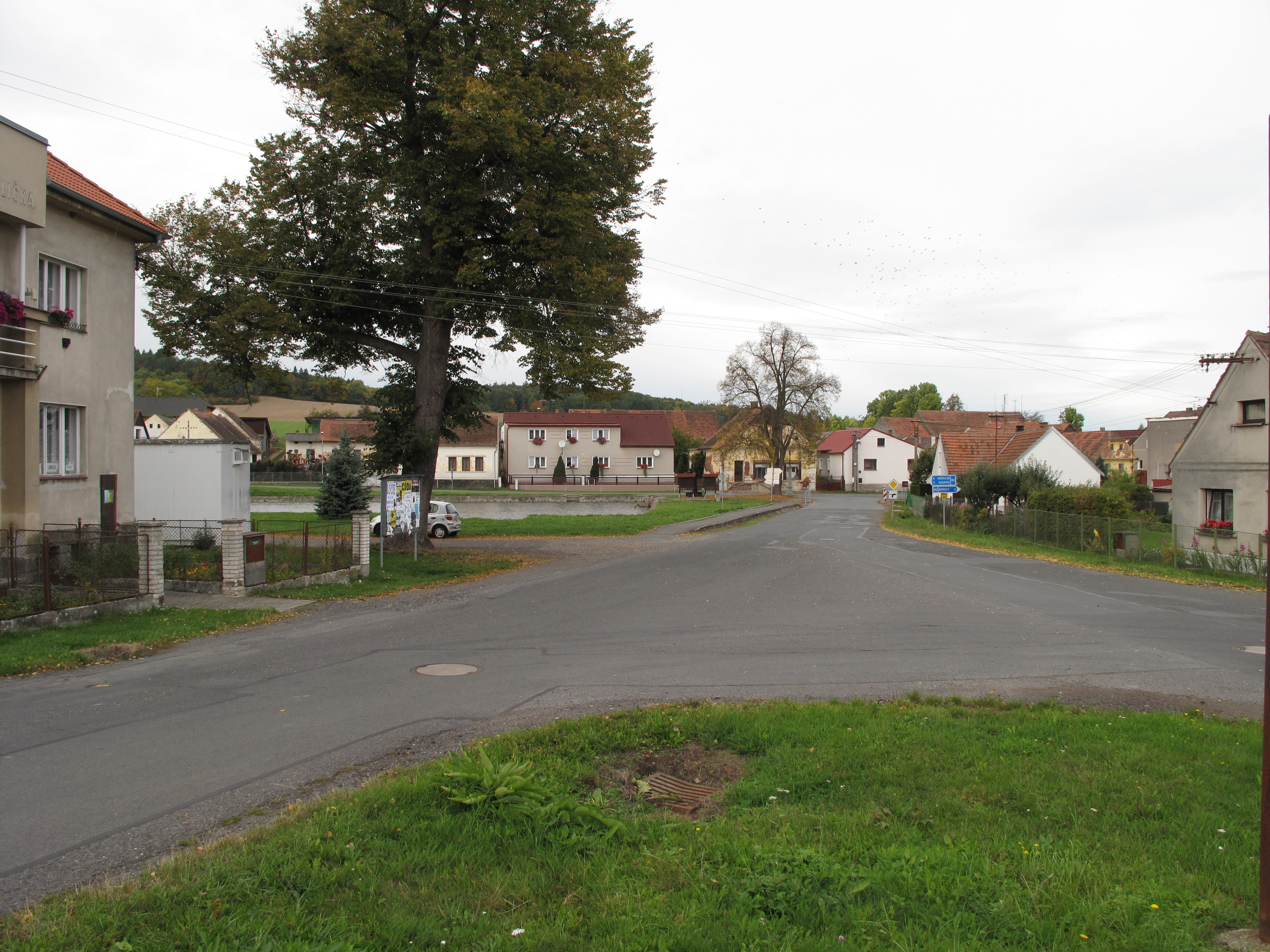
- Centre of Vřeskovice

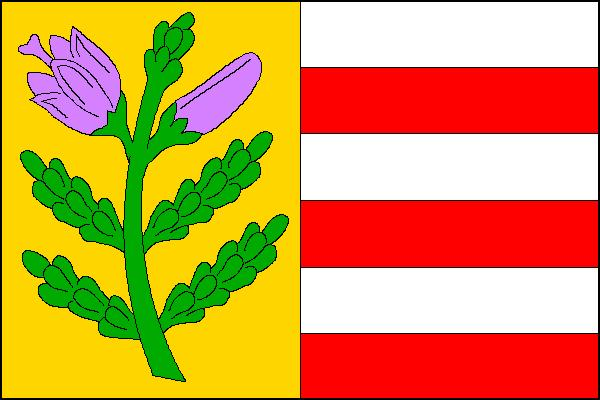
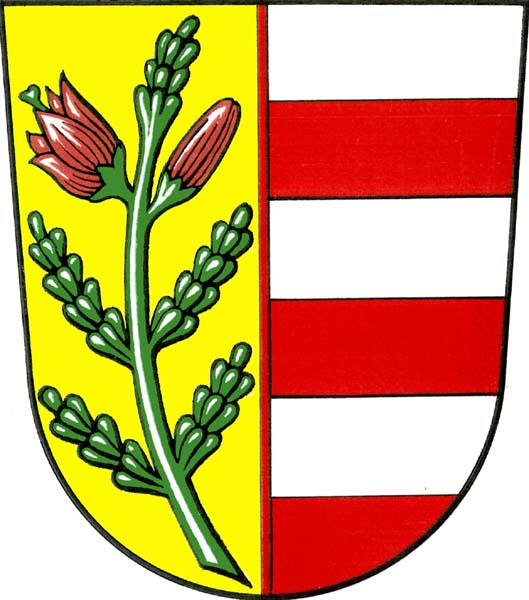
- Flag Coat of arms

- Location in the Czech Republic
- Coordinates: 49°31′32″N 13°16′16″E
- Country: Czech Republic
- Region: Plzeň
- District: Klatovy
- First mentioned: 1352

Area
  - Total: 8.74 km^{2} (3.37 sq mi)
- Elevation: 411 m (1,348 ft)

Population (2026-01-01)
  - Total: 343
  - Density: 39.2/km^{2} (102/sq mi)
- Time zone: UTC+1 (CET)
  - Summer (DST): UTC+2 (CEST)
- Postal code: 334 01
- Website: www.vreskovice.cz

Vřeskovice is a municipality and village in Klatovy District in the Plzeň Region of the Czech Republic. It has about 300 inhabitants.

Vřeskovice lies approximately 14 kilometres (9 mi) north of Klatovy, 27 km (17 mi) south of Plzeň, and 105 km (65 mi) south-west of Prague.

== Administrative division ==
Vřeskovice consists of two municipal parts (in brackets population according to the 2021 census):

- Vřeskovice (301)
- Mstice (5)

== Demographics ==
Historical population
Year	Pop.	±%
1869	540	—
1880	622	+15.2%
1890	521	−16.2%
1900	545	+4.6%
1910	589	+8.1%
1921	549	−6.8%
1930	587	+6.9%
1950	463	−21.1%
1961	436	−5.8%
1970	353	−19.0%
1980	334	−5.4%
1991	300	−10.2%
2001	290	−3.3%
2011	275	−5.2%
2021	306	+11.3%
Source: Censuses
