= Kejnice =

- Municipality
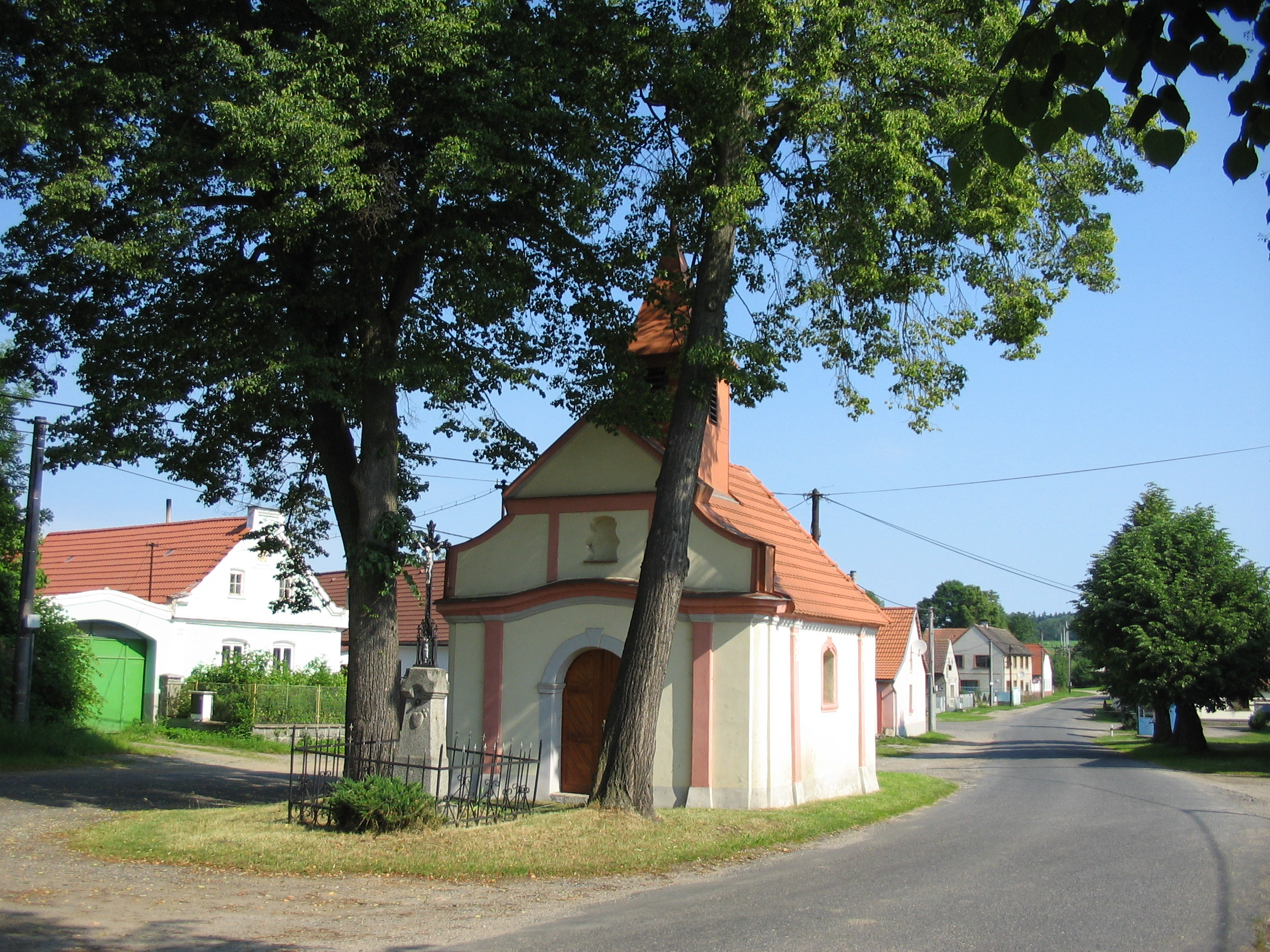
- Chapel of the Virgin Mary

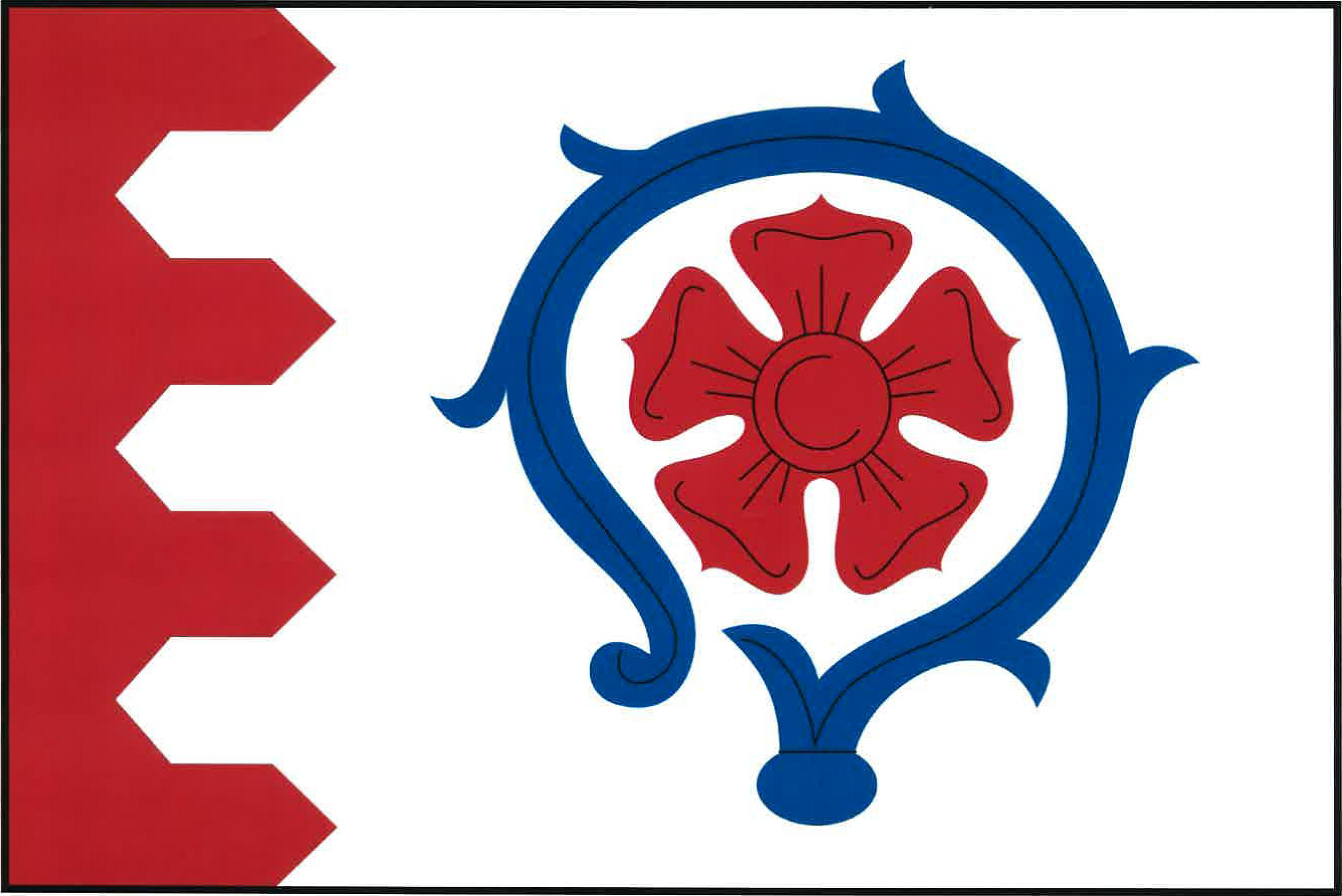
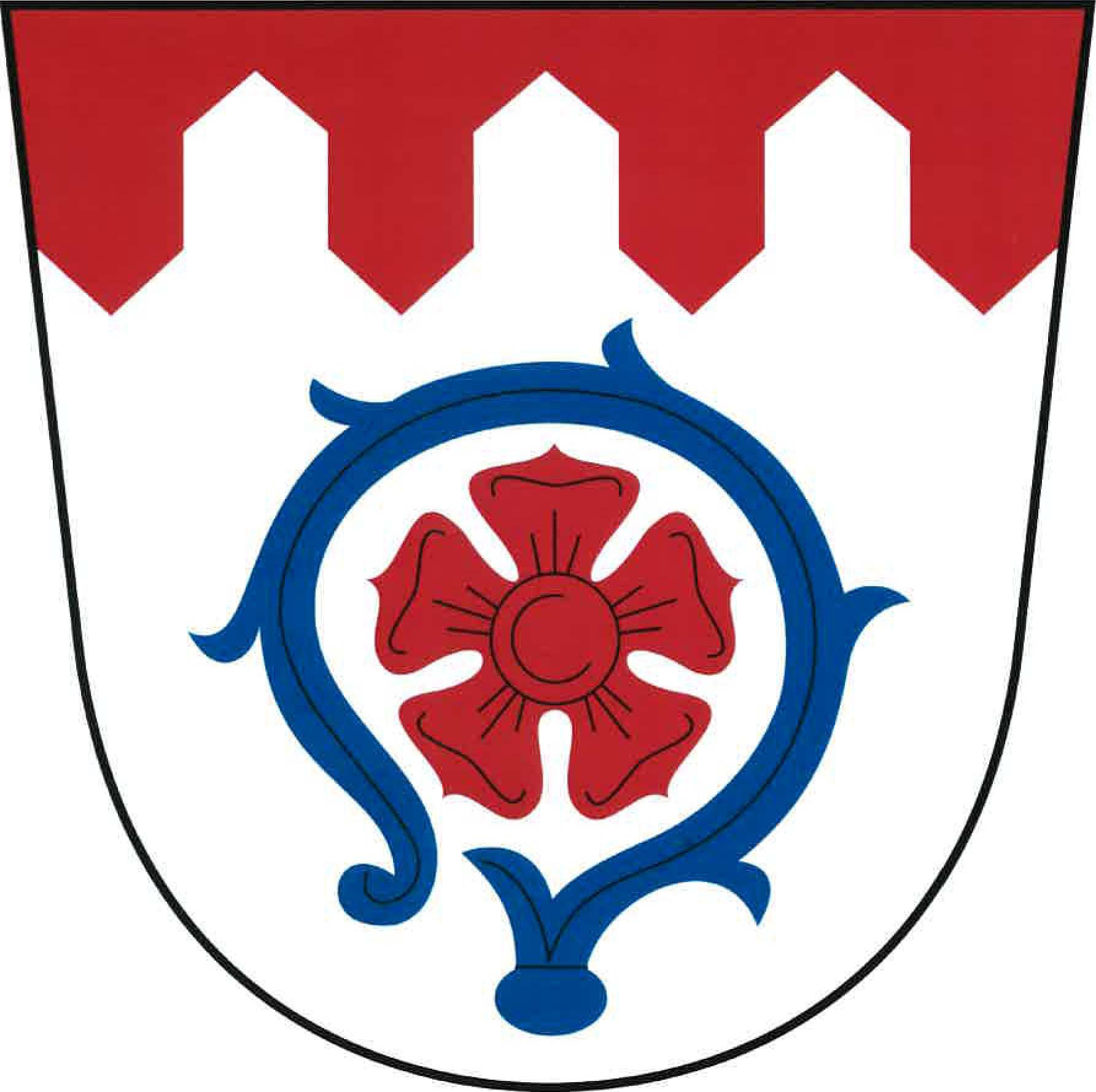
- Flag Coat of arms

- Location in the Czech Republic
- Coordinates: 49°16′1″N 13°41′39″E
- Country: Czech Republic
- Region: Plzeň
- District: Klatovy
- First mentioned: 1045

Area
  - Total: 3.70 km^{2} (1.43 sq mi)
- Elevation: 540 m (1,770 ft)

Population (2026-01-01)
  - Total: 100
  - Density: 27/km^{2} (70/sq mi)
- Time zone: UTC+1 (CET)
  - Summer (DST): UTC+2 (CEST)
- Postal code: 341 01
- Website: www.kejnice.cz

Kejnice is a municipality and village in Klatovy District in the Plzeň Region of the Czech Republic. It has about 100 inhabitants.

Kejnice lies approximately 34 kilometres (21 mi) south-east of Klatovy, 59 km (37 mi) south-east of Plzeň, and 105 km (65 mi) south-west of Prague.

== Administrative division ==
Kejnice consists of two municipal parts (in brackets population according to the 2021 census):

- Kejnice (97)
- Karlovce (11)

== Demographics ==
Historical population
Year	Pop.	±%
1869	271	—
1880	280	+3.3%
1890	256	−8.6%
1900	316	+23.4%
1910	317	+0.3%
1921	260	−18.0%
1930	293	+12.7%
1950	200	−31.7%
1961	216	+8.0%
1970	197	−8.8%
1980	182	−7.6%
1991	140	−23.1%
2001	130	−7.1%
2011	109	−16.2%
2021	108	−0.9%
Source: Censuses
