= Mezihoří =

- Municipality
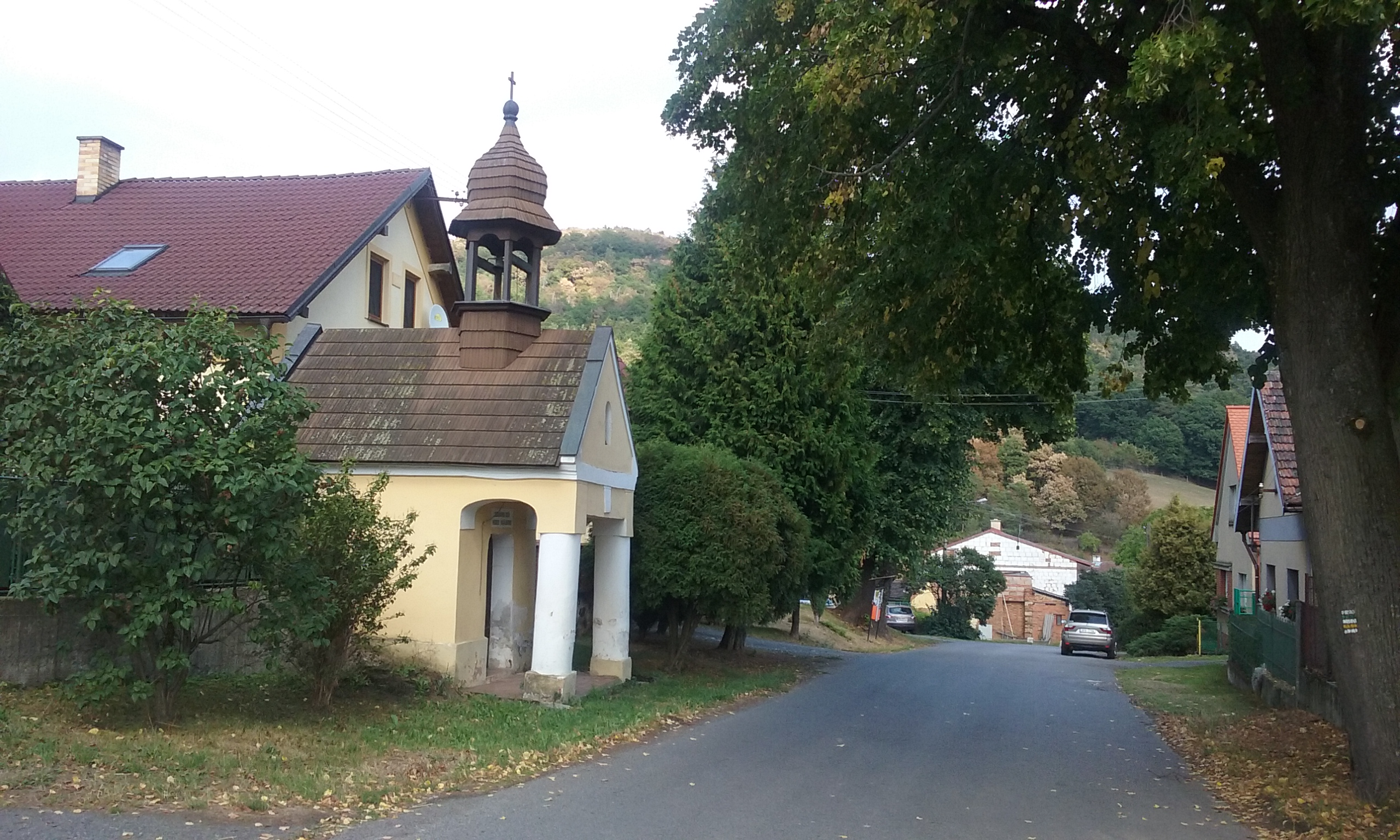
- Main street

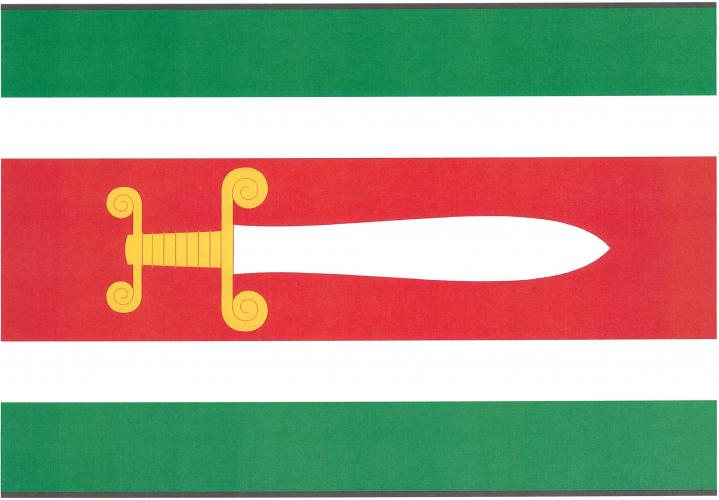
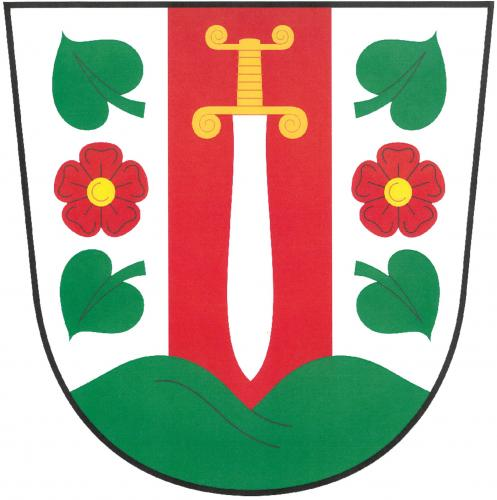
- Flag Coat of arms

- Location in the Czech Republic
- Coordinates: 49°29′19″N 13°15′17″E
- Country: Czech Republic
- Region: Plzeň
- District: Klatovy
- First mentioned: 1548

Area
  - Total: 1.80 km^{2} (0.69 sq mi)
- Elevation: 472 m (1,549 ft)

Population (2026-01-01)
  - Total: 74
  - Density: 41/km^{2} (110/sq mi)
- Time zone: UTC+1 (CET)
  - Summer (DST): UTC+2 (CEST)
- Postal code: 340 12
- Website: www.mezihori.eu

Mezihoří is a municipality and village in Klatovy District in the Plzeň Region of the Czech Republic. It has about 70 inhabitants.

Mezihoří lies approximately 11 kilometres (7 mi) north of Klatovy, 31 km (19 mi) south of Plzeň, and 108 km (67 mi) south-west of Prague.

== Demographics ==
Historical population
Year	Pop.	±%
1869	180	—
1880	192	+6.7%
1890	182	−5.2%
1900	167	−8.2%
1910	177	+6.0%
1921	199	+12.4%
1930	177	−11.1%
1950	132	−25.4%
1961	132	+0.0%
1970	113	−14.4%
1980	88	−22.1%
1991	78	−11.4%
2001	77	−1.3%
2011	71	−7.8%
2021	61	−14.1%
Source: Censuses
