= Obytce =

- Municipality
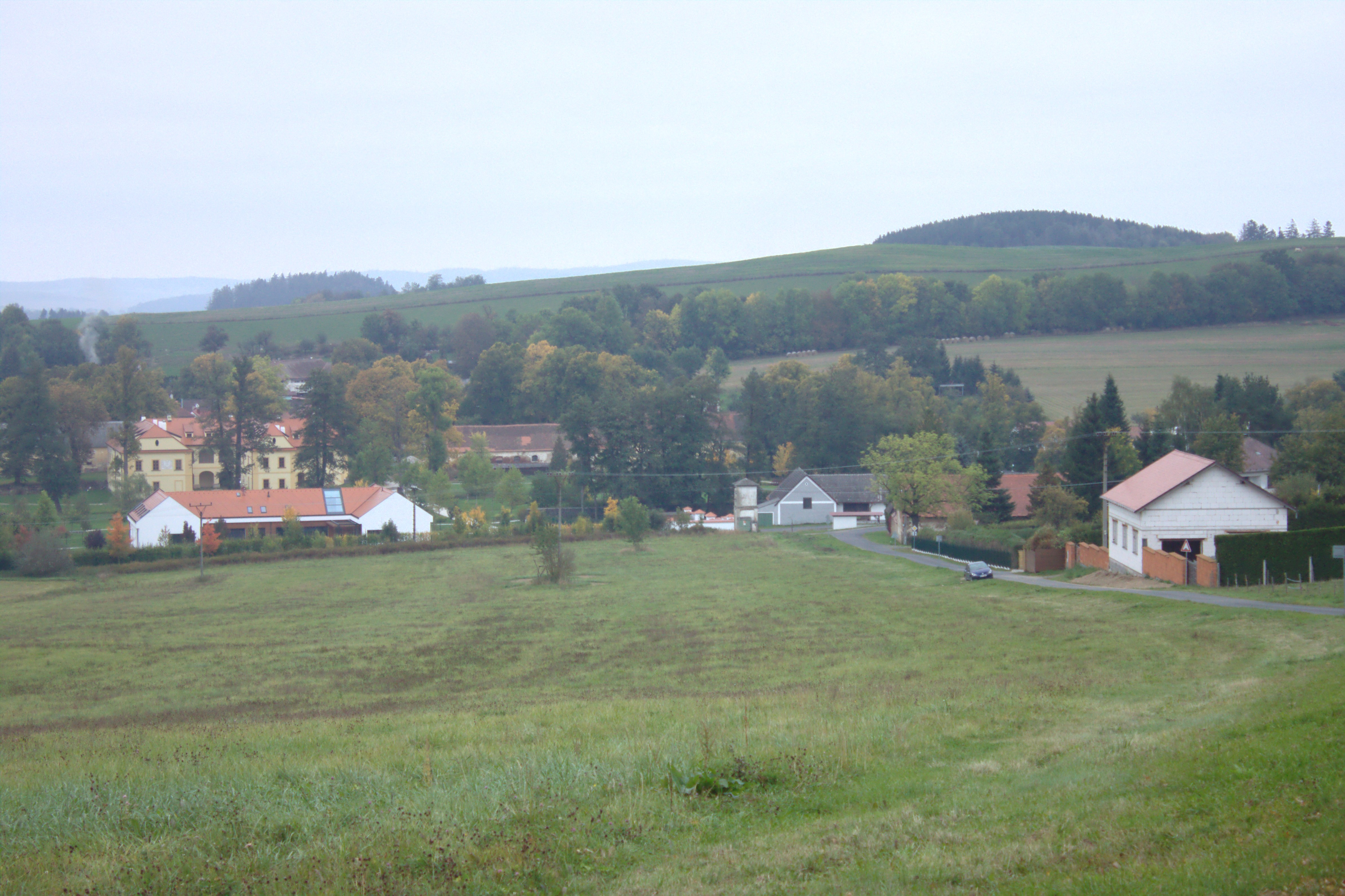
- View from the south

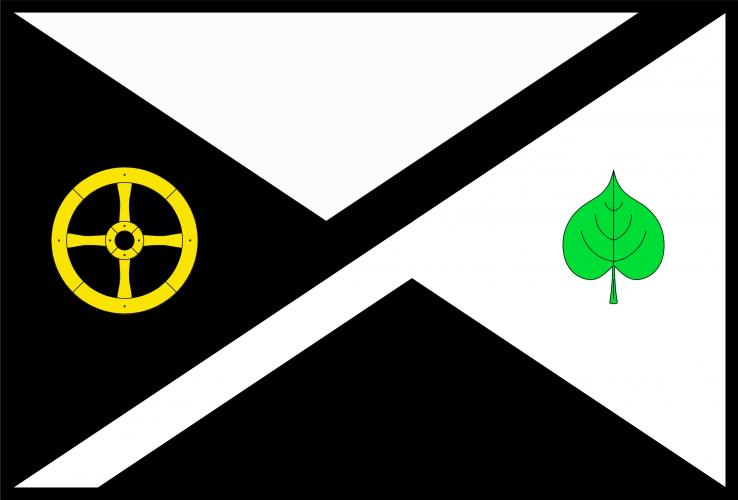
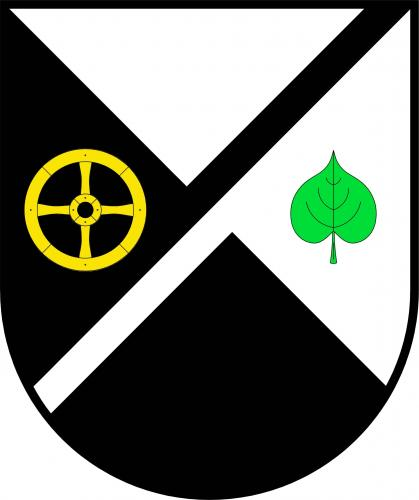
- Flag Coat of arms

- Location in the Czech Republic
- Coordinates: 49°23′27″N 13°22′43″E
- Country: Czech Republic
- Region: Plzeň
- District: Klatovy
- First mentioned: 1227

Area
  - Total: 4.38 km^{2} (1.69 sq mi)
- Elevation: 490 m (1,610 ft)

Population (2026-01-01)
  - Total: 238
  - Density: 54.3/km^{2} (141/sq mi)
- Time zone: UTC+1 (CET)
  - Summer (DST): UTC+2 (CEST)
- Postal code: 339 01
- Website: www.obytce.cz

Obytce is a municipality and village in Klatovy District in the Plzeň Region of the Czech Republic. It has about 200 inhabitants.

Obytce lies approximately 7 kilometres (4 mi) east of Klatovy, 40 km (25 mi) south of Plzeň, and 108 km (67 mi) south-west of Prague.

== Demographics ==
Historical population
Year	Pop.	±%
1869	486	—
1880	498	+2.5%
1890	445	−10.6%
1900	434	−2.5%
1910	453	+4.4%
1921	466	+2.9%
1930	406	−12.9%
1950	233	−42.6%
1961	214	−8.2%
1970	196	−8.4%
1980	167	−14.8%
1991	160	−4.2%
2001	168	+5.0%
2011	199	+18.5%
2021	220	+10.6%
Source: Censuses
