= Frymburk (Klatovy District) =

- Municipality
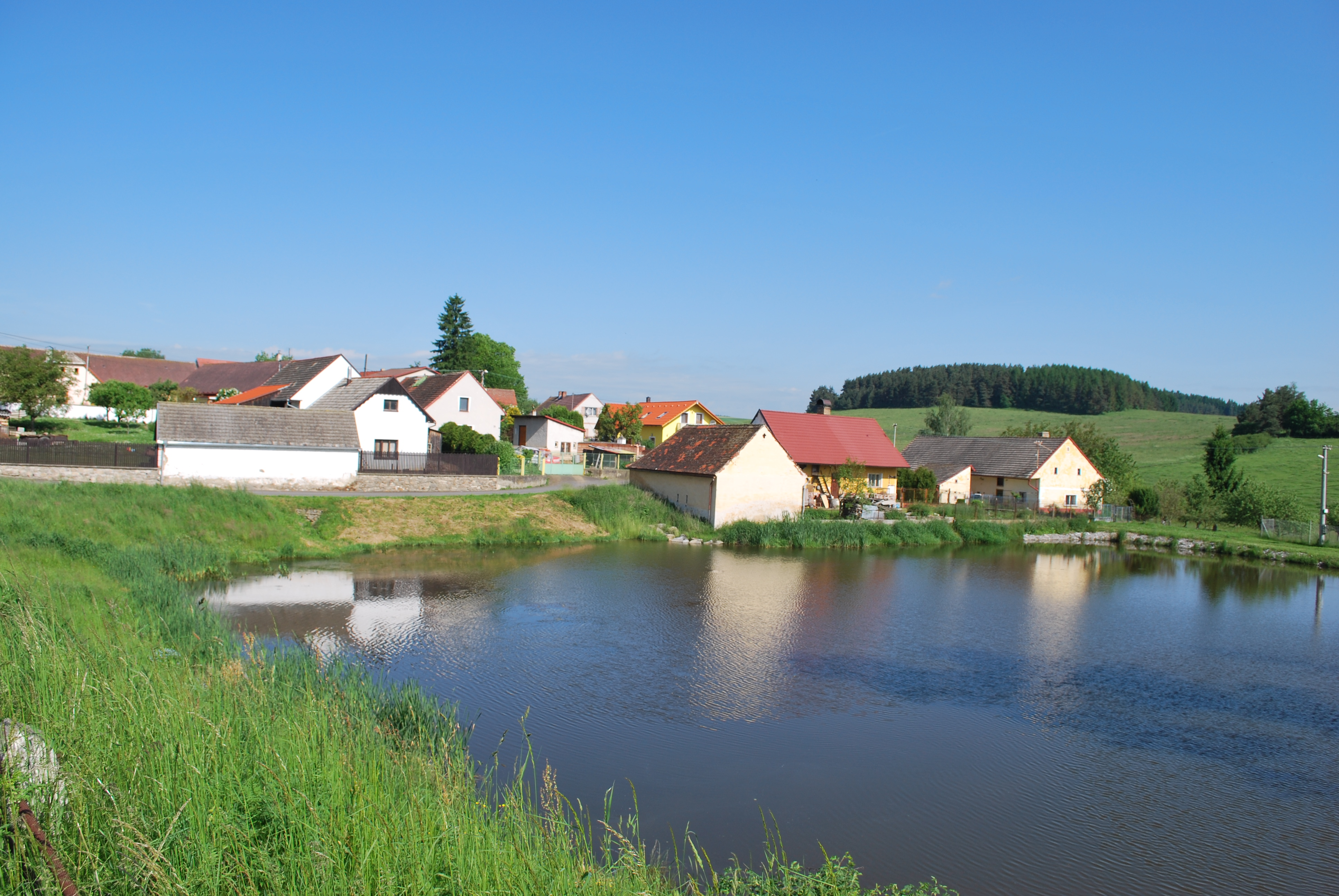
- Centre of Frymburk

- Flag Coat of arms

- Location in the Czech Republic
- Coordinates: 49°14′59″N 13°42′26″E
- Country: Czech Republic
- Region: Plzeň
- District: Klatovy
- First mentioned: 1318

Area
  - Total: 6.54 km^{2} (2.53 sq mi)
- Elevation: 493 m (1,617 ft)

Population (2026-01-01)
  - Total: 102
  - Density: 15.6/km^{2} (40.4/sq mi)
- Time zone: UTC+1 (CET)
  - Summer (DST): UTC+2 (CEST)
- Postal code: 342 01
- Website: www.obecfrymburk.cz

Frymburk (in 1951–1991 Želenov; German: Frimburg) is a municipality and village in Klatovy District in the Plzeň Region of the Czech Republic. It has about 100 inhabitants.

Frymburk lies approximately 36 kilometres (22 mi) south-east of Klatovy, 61 km (38 mi) south-east of Plzeň, and 107 km (66 mi) south-west of Prague.

== Administrative division ==
Frymburk consists of two municipal parts (in brackets population according to the 2021 census):

- Frymburk (87)
- Damětice (17)

== Demographics ==
Historical population
Year	Pop.	±%
1869	401	—
1880	416	+3.7%
1890	419	+0.7%
1900	412	−1.7%
1910	433	+5.1%
1921	390	−9.9%
1930	373	−4.4%
1950	295	−20.9%
1961	272	−7.8%
1970	202	−25.7%
1980	155	−23.3%
1991	108	−30.3%
2001	101	−6.5%
2011	106	+5.0%
2021	104	−1.9%
Source: Censuses
