= Hejná =

- Municipality
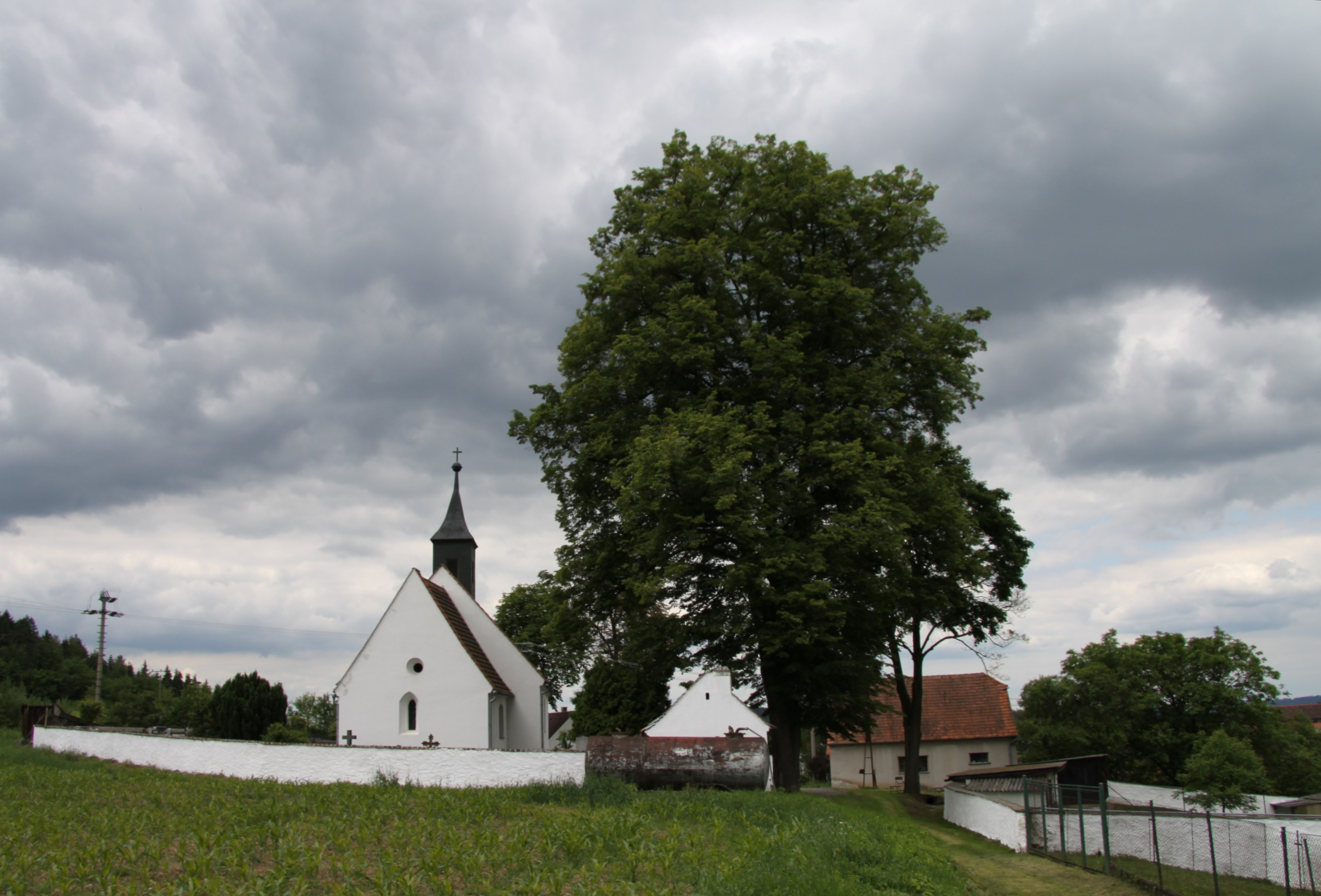
- Church of Saints James and Philip

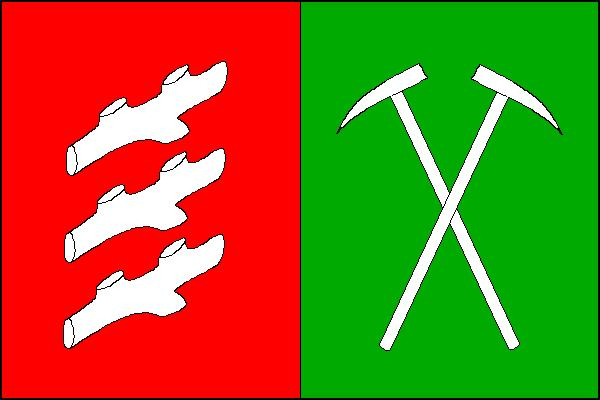
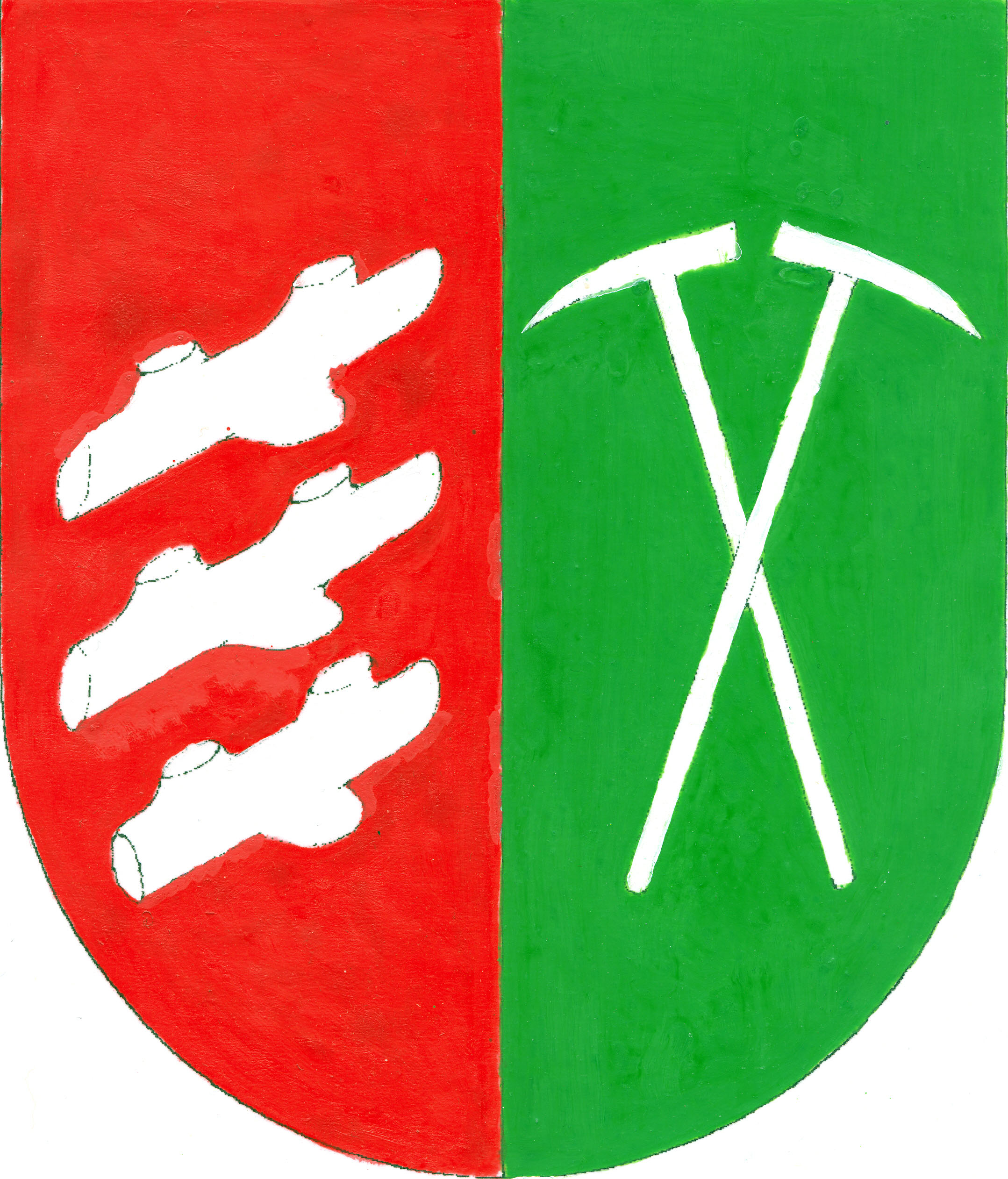
- Flag Coat of arms

- Location in the Czech Republic
- Coordinates: 49°17′22″N 13°40′29″E
- Country: Czech Republic
- Region: Plzeň
- District: Klatovy
- First mentioned: 1045

Area
  - Total: 6.70 km^{2} (2.59 sq mi)
- Elevation: 475 m (1,558 ft)

Population (2026-01-01)
  - Total: 153
  - Density: 22.8/km^{2} (59.1/sq mi)
- Time zone: UTC+1 (CET)
  - Summer (DST): UTC+2 (CEST)
- Postal code: 341 01
- Website: www.sumavanet.cz/hejna/

Hejná is a municipality and village in Klatovy District in the Plzeň Region of the Czech Republic. It has about 200 inhabitants.

Hejná lies approximately 31 kilometres (19 mi) south-east of Klatovy, 56 km (35 mi) south-east of Plzeň, and 104 km (65 mi) south-west of Prague.

== Demographics ==
Historical population
Year	Pop.	±%
1869	341	—
1880	362	+6.2%
1890	395	+9.1%
1900	346	−12.4%
1910	398	+15.0%
1921	439	+10.3%
1930	411	−6.4%
1950	362	−11.9%
1961	337	−6.9%
1970	263	−22.0%
1980	229	−12.9%
1991	168	−26.6%
2001	158	−6.0%
2011	170	+7.6%
2021	151	−11.2%
Source: Censuses
