= Svéradice =

- Municipality
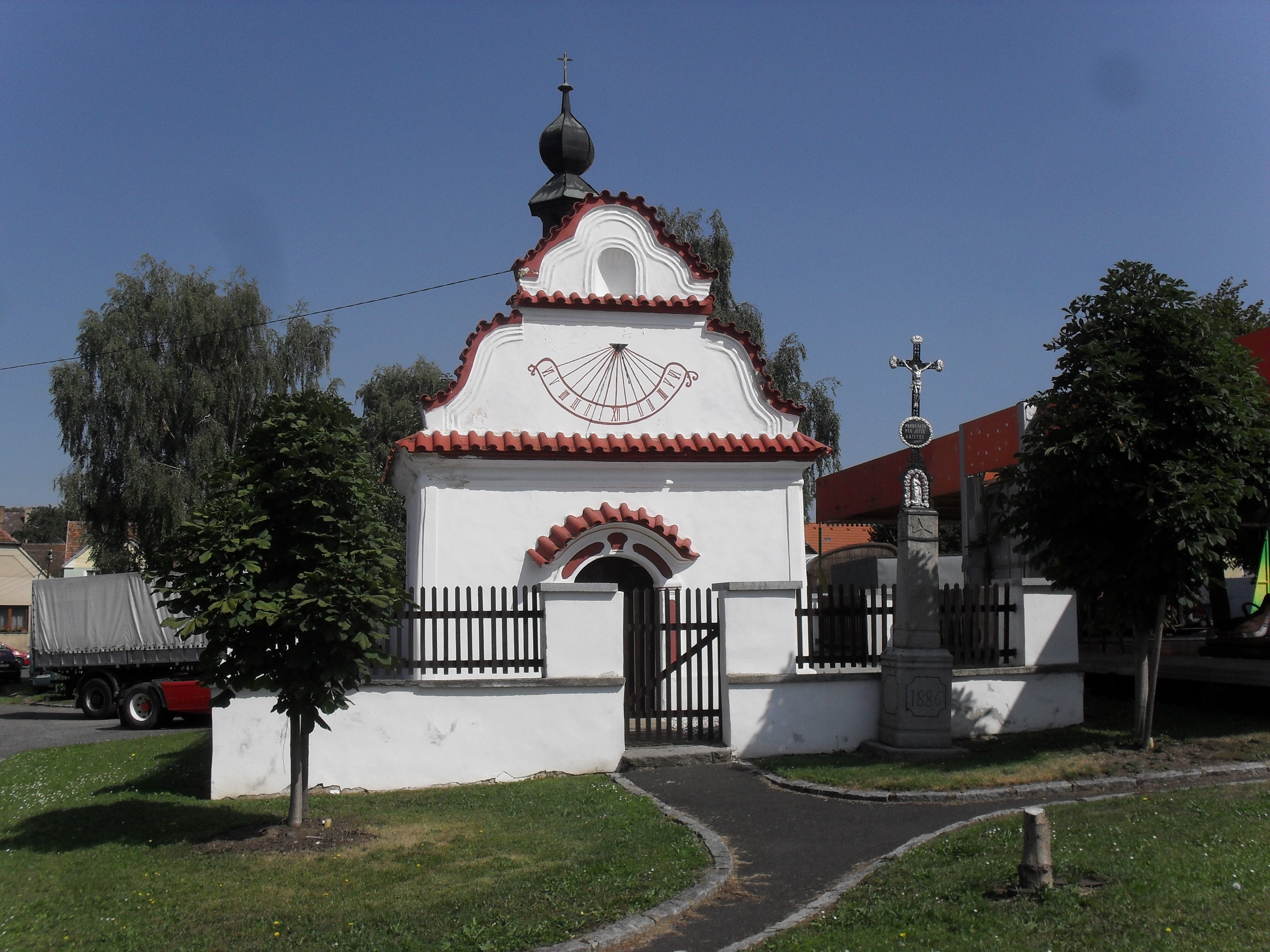
- Chapel of Saint Anne

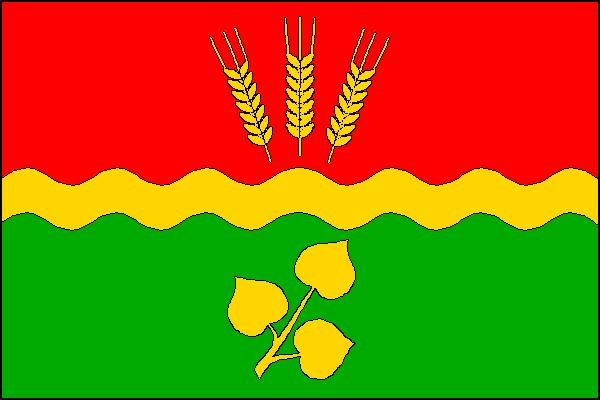
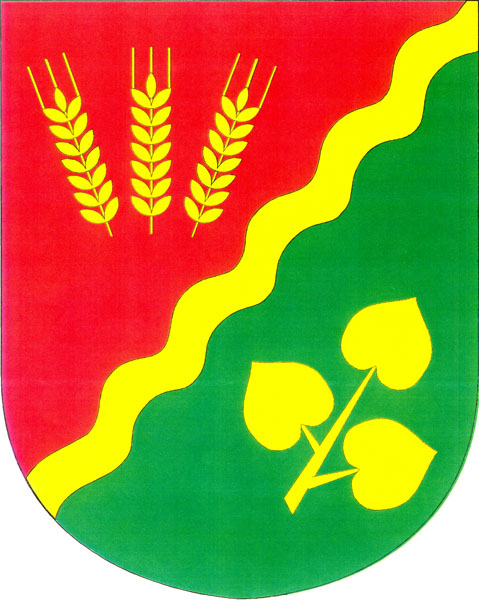
- Flag Coat of arms

- Location in the Czech Republic
- Coordinates: 49°22′17″N 13°44′23″E
- Country: Czech Republic
- Region: Plzeň
- District: Klatovy
- First mentioned: 1264

Area
  - Total: 11.18 km^{2} (4.32 sq mi)
- Elevation: 448 m (1,470 ft)

Population (2026-01-01)
  - Total: 285
  - Density: 25.5/km^{2} (66.0/sq mi)
- Time zone: UTC+1 (CET)
  - Summer (DST): UTC+2 (CEST)
- Postal code: 341 01
- Website: www.obecsveradice.cz

Svéradice is a municipality and village in Klatovy District in the Plzeň Region of the Czech Republic. It has about 300 inhabitants.

Svéradice lies approximately 34 kilometres (21 mi) east of Klatovy, 50 km (31 mi) south-east of Plzeň, and 94 km (58 mi) south-west of Prague.

== Demographics ==
Historical population
Year	Pop.	±%
1869	618	—
1880	658	+6.5%
1890	591	−10.2%
1900	582	−1.5%
1910	576	−1.0%
1921	557	−3.3%
1930	465	−16.5%
1950	394	−15.3%
1961	342	−13.2%
1970	304	−11.1%
1980	327	+7.6%
1991	355	+8.6%
2001	354	−0.3%
2011	336	−5.1%
2021	286	−14.9%
Source: Censuses
