= Hradešice =

- Municipality
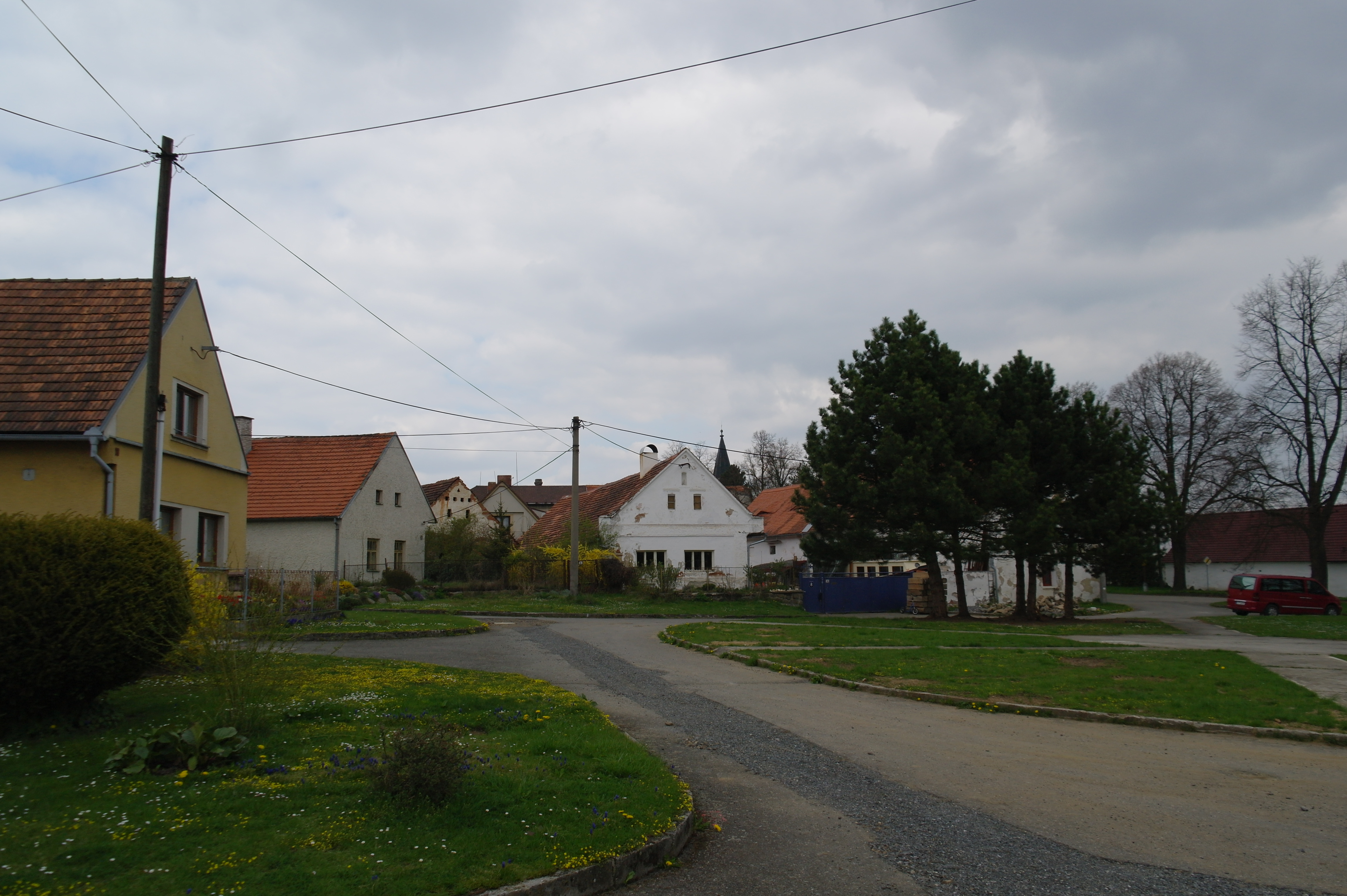
- Centre of Hradešice

- Location in the Czech Republic
- Coordinates: 49°19′24″N 13°35′47″E
- Country: Czech Republic
- Region: Plzeň
- District: Klatovy
- First mentioned: 1360

Area
  - Total: 14.86 km^{2} (5.74 sq mi)
- Elevation: 458 m (1,503 ft)

Population (2026-01-01)
  - Total: 426
  - Density: 28.7/km^{2} (74.2/sq mi)
- Time zone: UTC+1 (CET)
  - Summer (DST): UTC+2 (CEST)
- Postal code: 341 01
- Website: www.hradesice.cz

Hradešice is a municipality and village in Klatovy District in the Plzeň Region of the Czech Republic. It has about 400 inhabitants. The historic centre of the village is well preserved and is protected as a village monument zone.

Hradešice lies approximately 25 kilometres (16 mi) east of Klatovy, 50 km (31 mi) south of Plzeň, and 104 km (65 mi) south-west of Prague.

== Administrative division ==
Hradešice consists of three municipal parts (in brackets population according to the 2021 census):

- Hradešice (281)
- Černíč (59)
- Smrkovec (78)

== Demographics ==
Historical population
Year	Pop.	±%
1869	891	—
1880	951	+6.7%
1890	905	−4.8%
1900	866	−4.3%
1910	949	+9.6%
1921	931	−1.9%
1930	789	−15.3%
1950	655	−17.0%
1961	614	−6.3%
1970	561	−8.6%
1980	510	−9.1%
1991	457	−10.4%
2001	436	−4.6%
2011	404	−7.3%
2021	418	+3.5%
Source: Censuses
