= Maňovice =

- Municipality
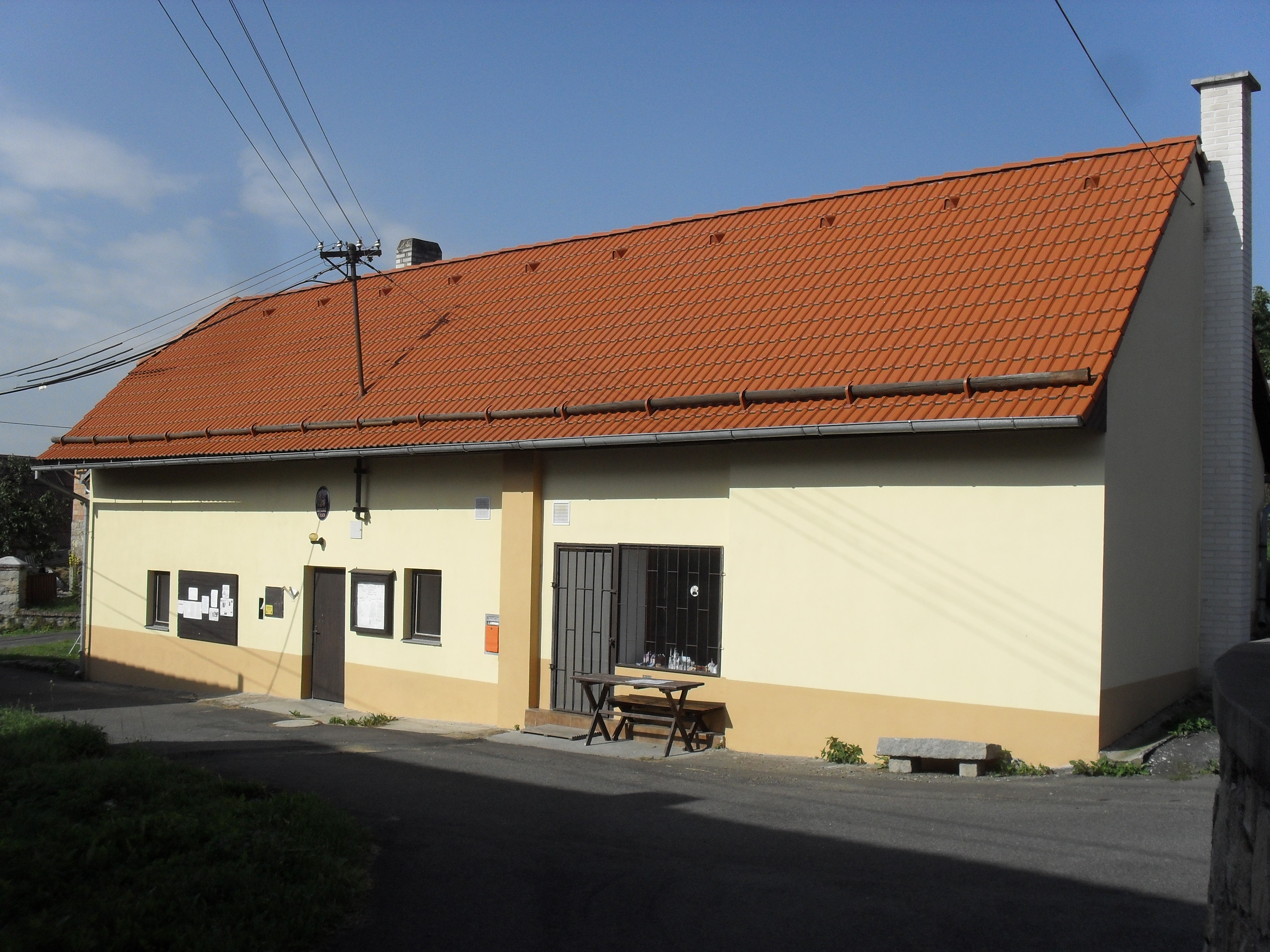
- Municipal office

- Flag Coat of arms

- Location in the Czech Republic
- Coordinates: 49°23′35″N 13°39′14″E
- Country: Czech Republic
- Region: Plzeň
- District: Klatovy
- First mentioned: 1366

Area
  - Total: 2.83 km^{2} (1.09 sq mi)
- Elevation: 520 m (1,710 ft)

Population (2026-01-01)
  - Total: 41
  - Density: 14/km^{2} (38/sq mi)
- Time zone: UTC+1 (CET)
  - Summer (DST): UTC+2 (CEST)
- Postal code: 341 01
- Website: www.manoviceupacejova.cz

Maňovice is a municipality and village in Klatovy District in the Plzeň Region of the Czech Republic. It has about 40 inhabitants.

Maňovice lies approximately 27 kilometres (17 mi) east of Klatovy, 45 km (28 mi) south-east of Plzeň, and 95 km (59 mi) south-west of Prague.

== Demographics ==
Historical population
Year	Pop.	±%
1869	177	—
1880	230	+29.9%
1890	211	−8.3%
1900	199	−5.7%
1910	199	+0.0%
1921	189	−5.0%
1930	180	−4.8%
1950	135	−25.0%
1961	125	−7.4%
1970	111	−11.2%
1980	78	−29.7%
1991	49	−37.2%
2001	44	−10.2%
2011	33	−25.0%
2021	39	+18.2%
Source: Censuses
