= Ostřetice =

- Municipality
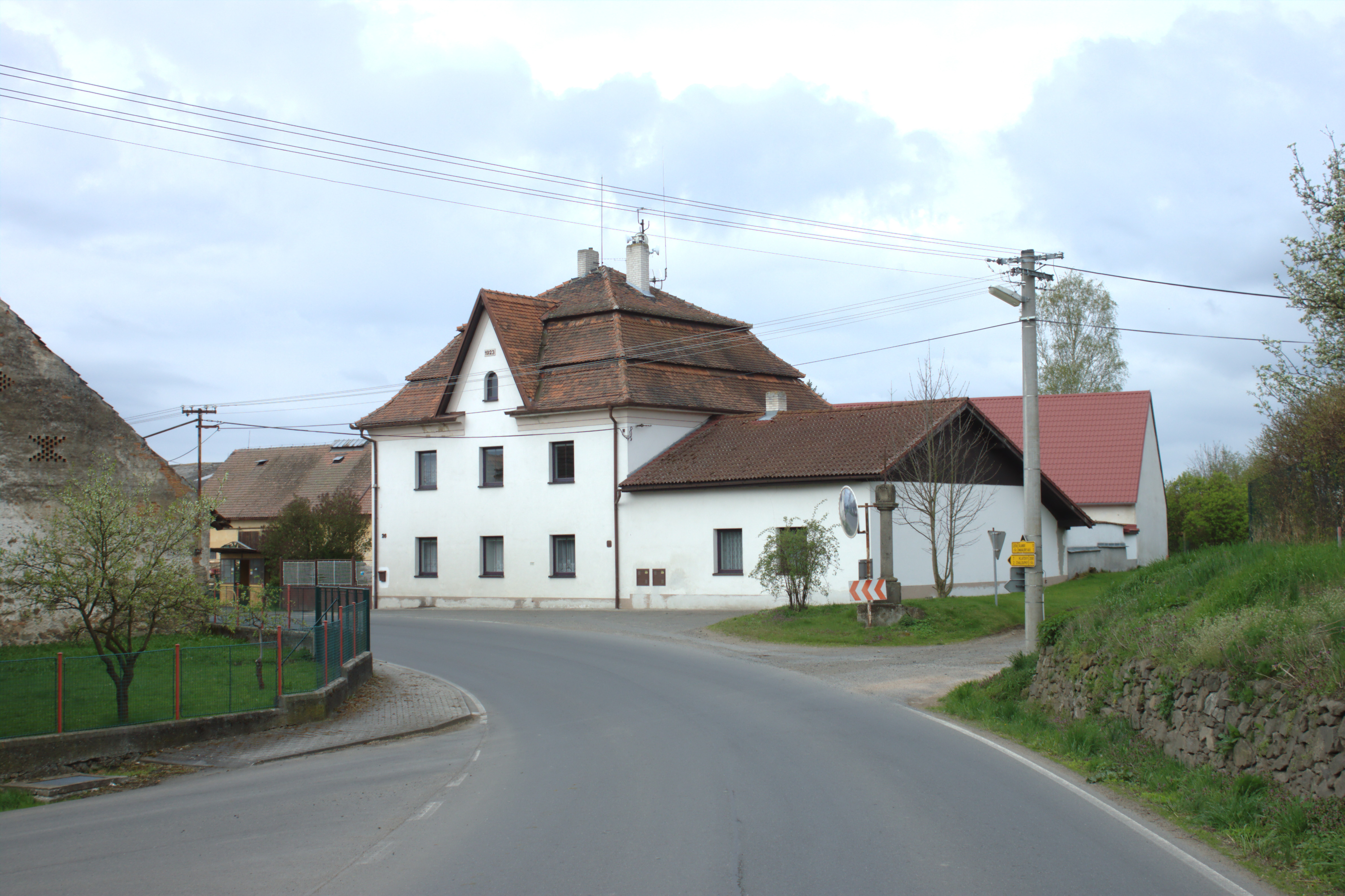
- Main road

- Location in the Czech Republic
- Coordinates: 49°25′21″N 13°20′49″E
- Country: Czech Republic
- Region: Plzeň
- District: Klatovy
- First mentioned: 1379

Area
  - Total: 5.07 km^{2} (1.96 sq mi)
- Elevation: 415 m (1,362 ft)

Population (2026-01-01)
  - Total: 76
  - Density: 15/km^{2} (39/sq mi)
- Time zone: UTC+1 (CET)
  - Summer (DST): UTC+2 (CEST)
- Postal code: 339 01
- Website: www.ostretice.cz

Ostřetice is a municipality and village in Klatovy District in the Plzeň Region of the Czech Republic. It has about 80 inhabitants. The historic centre of the village is well preserved and is protected as a village monument zone.

Ostřetice lies approximately 6 kilometres (4 mi) north-east of Klatovy, 36 km (22 mi) south of Plzeň, and 107 km (66 mi) south-west of Prague.

== Administrative division ==
Ostřetice consists of two municipal parts (in brackets population according to the 2021 census):

- Ostřetice (51)
- Makalovy (19)

== Demographics ==
Historical population
Year	Pop.	±%
1869	197	—
1880	229	+16.2%
1890	213	−7.0%
1900	222	+4.2%
1910	223	+0.5%
1921	206	−7.6%
1930	198	−3.9%
1950	116	−41.4%
1961	122	+5.2%
1970	103	−15.6%
1980	74	−28.2%
1991	65	−12.2%
2001	59	−9.2%
2011	66	+11.9%
2021	70	+6.1%
Source: Censuses
