= Tužice =

- Municipality
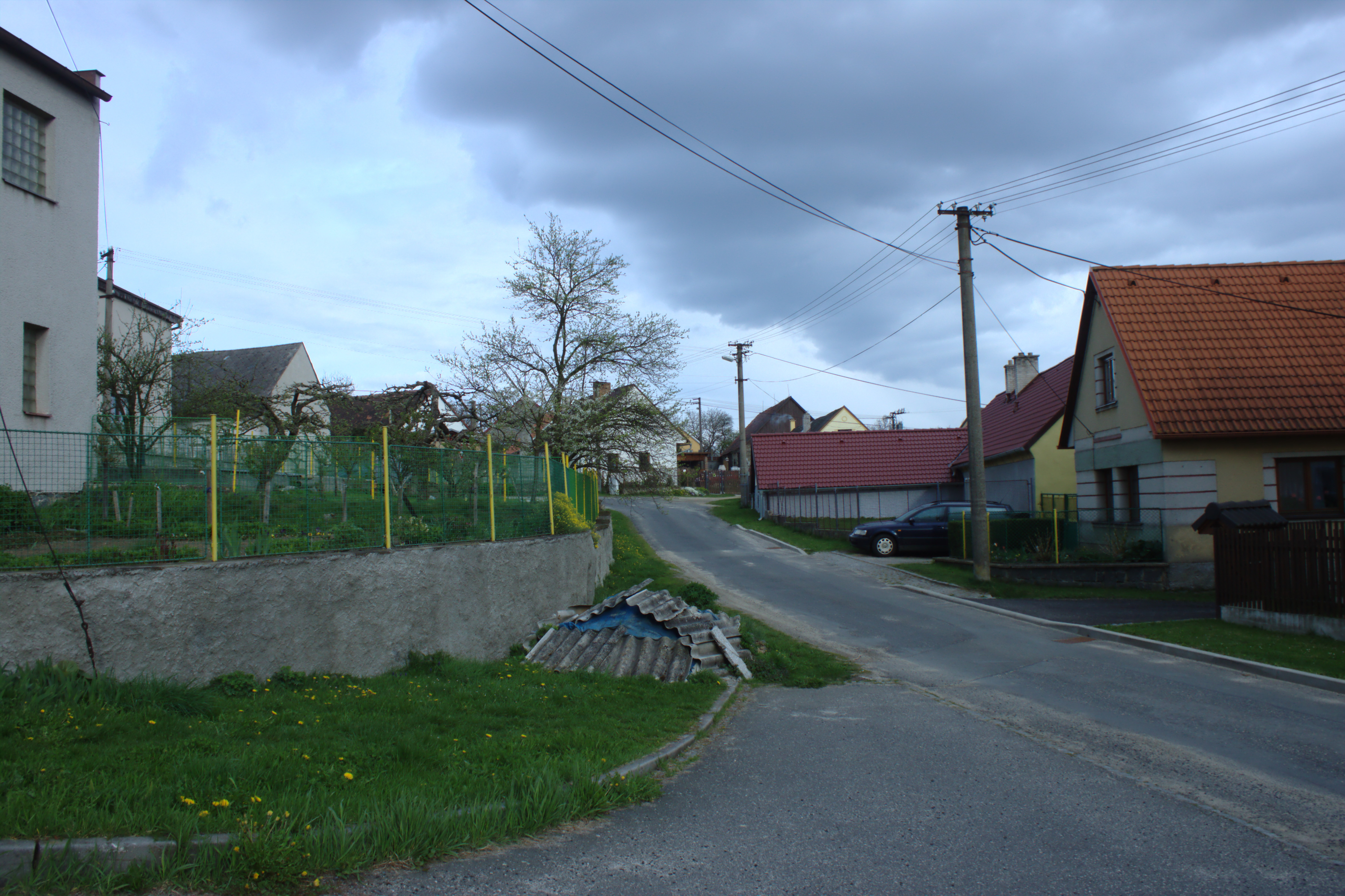
- Main street

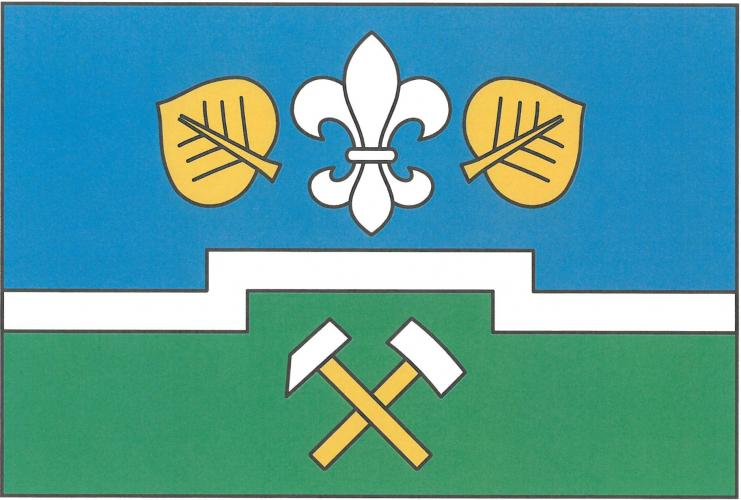
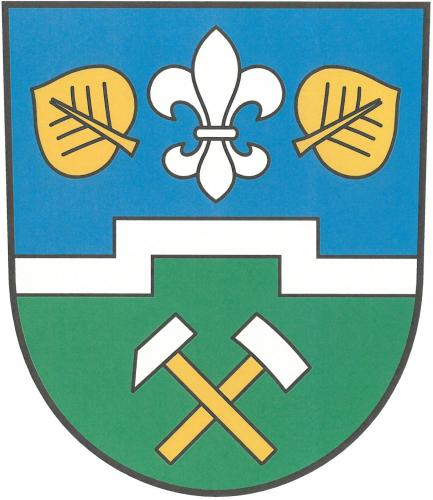
- Flag Coat of arms

- Location in the Czech Republic
- Coordinates: 49°20′6″N 13°30′38″E
- Country: Czech Republic
- Region: Plzeň
- District: Klatovy
- First mentioned: 1381

Area
  - Total: 2.60 km^{2} (1.00 sq mi)
- Elevation: 552 m (1,811 ft)

Population (2026-01-01)
  - Total: 89
  - Density: 34/km^{2} (89/sq mi)
- Time zone: UTC+1 (CET)
  - Summer (DST): UTC+2 (CEST)
- Postal code: 341 42
- Website: www.tuzice.ic.cz

Tužice is a municipality and village in Klatovy District in the Plzeň Region of the Czech Republic. It has about 90 inhabitants.

Tužice lies approximately 18 kilometres (11 mi) east of Klatovy, 47 km (29 mi) south of Plzeň, and 106 km (66 mi) south-west of Prague.

== Demographics ==
Historical population
Year	Pop.	±%
1869	175	—
1880	172	−1.7%
1890	177	+2.9%
1900	169	−4.5%
1910	168	−0.6%
1921	188	+11.9%
1930	191	+1.6%
1950	140	−26.7%
1961	126	−10.0%
1970	115	−8.7%
1980	115	+0.0%
1991	91	−20.9%
2001	79	−13.2%
2011	88	+11.4%
2021	93	+5.7%
Source: Censuses
