= Černíkov =

- Municipality
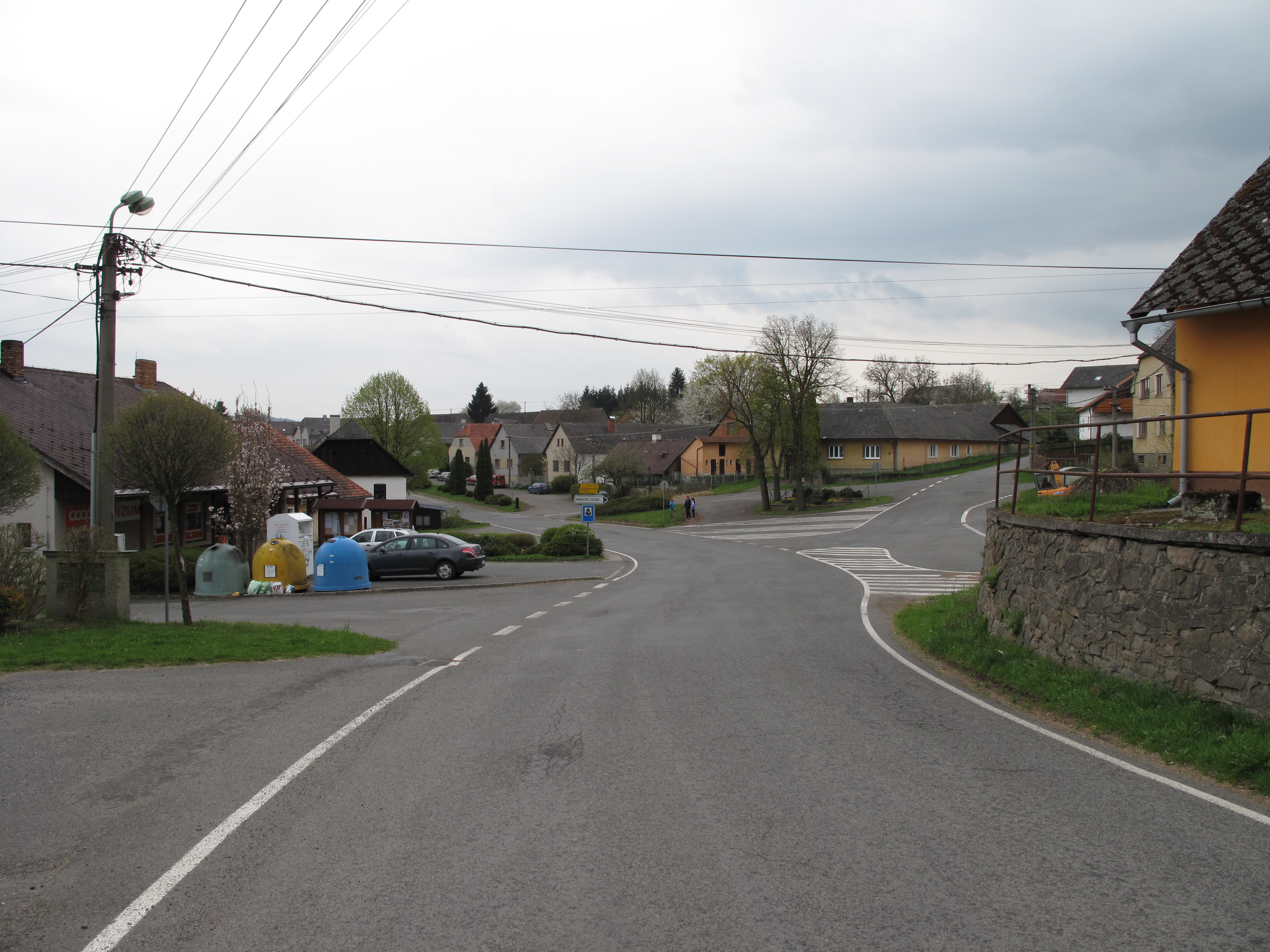
- Centre of Černíkov

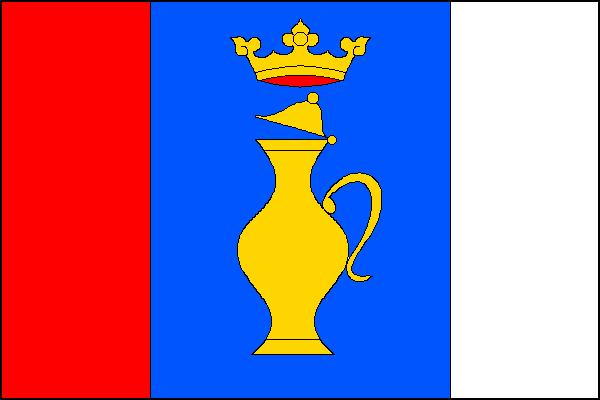
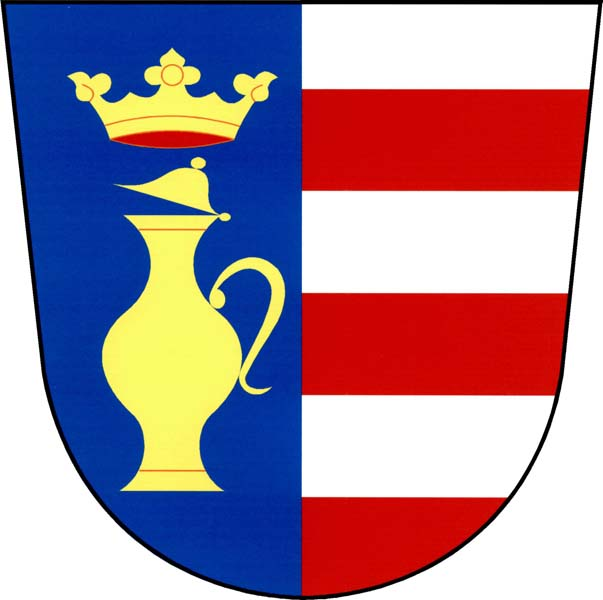
- Flag Coat of arms

- Location in the Czech Republic
- Coordinates: 49°25′22″N 13°7′48″E
- Country: Czech Republic
- Region: Plzeň
- District: Klatovy
- First mentioned: 1379

Area
  - Total: 16.72 km^{2} (6.46 sq mi)
- Elevation: 498 m (1,634 ft)

Population (2026-01-01)
  - Total: 370
  - Density: 22/km^{2} (57/sq mi)
- Time zone: UTC+1 (CET)
  - Summer (DST): UTC+2 (CEST)
- Postal code: 345 06
- Website: www.cernikov.cz

Černíkov is a municipality and village in Klatovy District in the Plzeň Region of the Czech Republic. It has about 400 inhabitants.

Černíkov lies approximately 13 kilometres (8 mi) west of Klatovy, 41 km (25 mi) south-west of Plzeň, and 119 km (74 mi) south-west of Prague.

== Administrative division ==
Černíkov consists of five municipal parts (in brackets population according to the 2021 census):

- Černíkov (145)
- Nevděk (4)
- Rudoltice (41)
- Slavíkovice (105)
- Vílov (43)

== Demographics ==
Historical population
Year	Pop.	±%
1869	1,166	—
1880	1,130	−3.1%
1890	976	−13.6%
1900	1,030	+5.5%
1910	999	−3.0%
1921	935	−6.4%
1930	843	−9.8%
1950	584	−30.7%
1961	553	−5.3%
1970	461	−16.6%
1980	381	−17.4%
1991	374	−1.8%
2001	333	−11.0%
2011	323	−3.0%
2021	338	+4.6%
Source: Censuses
