= Vrhaveč =

- Municipality
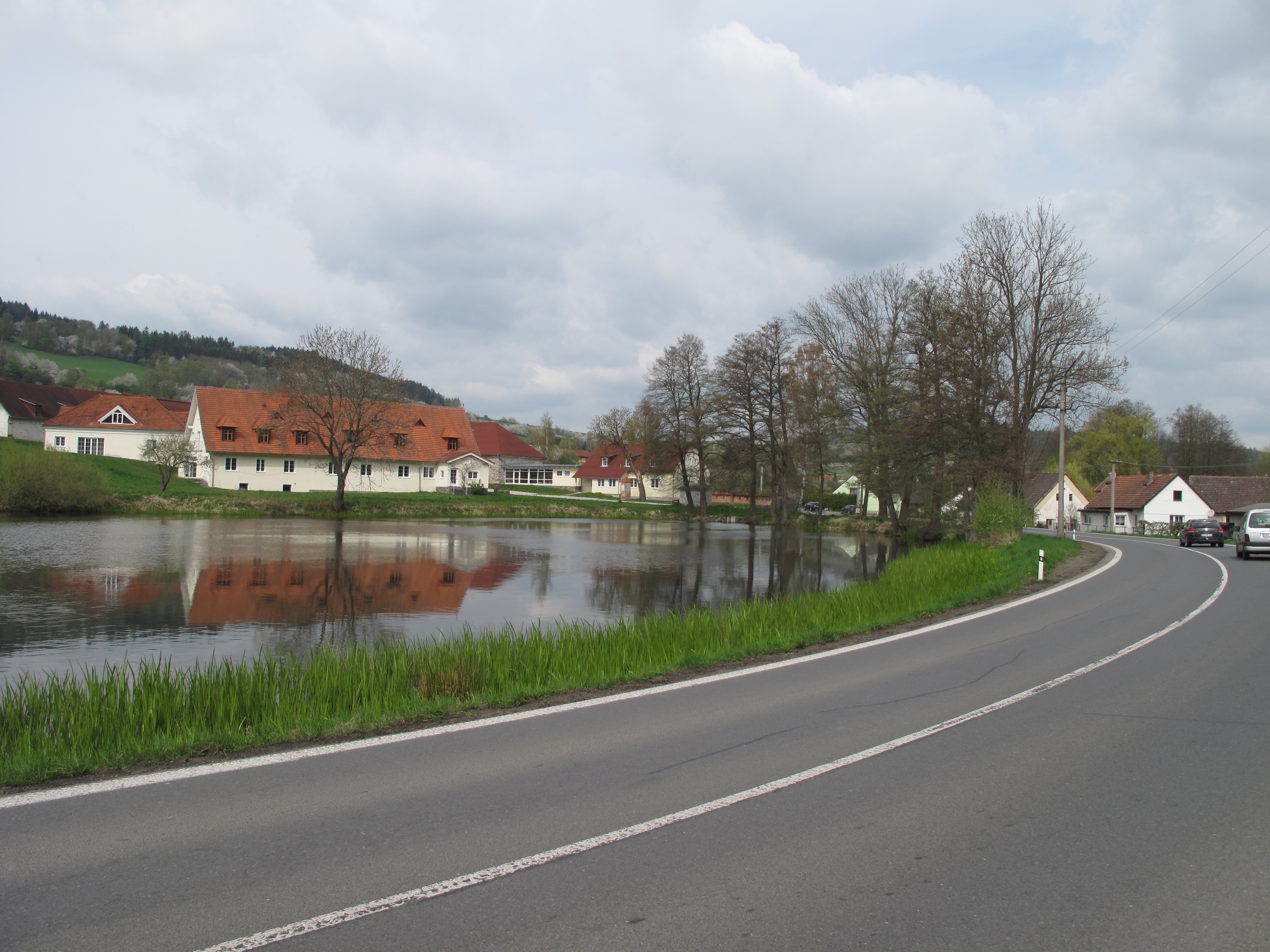
- A pond in the centre of Vrhaveč

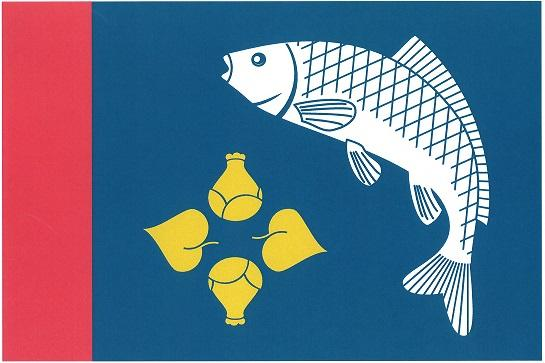
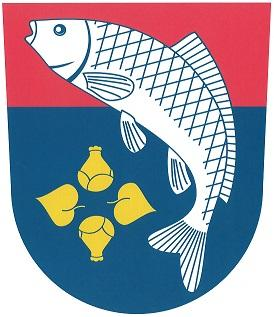
- Flag Coat of arms

- Location in the Czech Republic
- Coordinates: 49°20′44″N 13°17′47″E
- Country: Czech Republic
- Region: Plzeň
- District: Klatovy
- First mentioned: 1379

Area
  - Total: 12.11 km^{2} (4.68 sq mi)
- Elevation: 427 m (1,401 ft)

Population (2026-01-01)
  - Total: 930
  - Density: 77/km^{2} (200/sq mi)
- Time zone: UTC+1 (CET)
  - Summer (DST): UTC+2 (CEST)
- Postal code: 339 01
- Website: www.vrhavec.cz

Vrhaveč is a municipality and village in Klatovy District in the Plzeň Region of the Czech Republic. It has about 900 inhabitants.

Vrhaveč lies approximately 7 kilometres (4 mi) south of Klatovy, 46 km (29 mi) south of Plzeň, and 116 km (72 mi) south-west of Prague.

== Administrative division ==
Vrhaveč consists of four municipal parts (in brackets population according to the 2021 census):

- Vrhaveč (301)
- Malá Víska (266)
- Neznašovy (171)
- Radinovy (149)

== Demographics ==
Historical population
| Year | Pop. | ±% |
|---|---|---|
| 1869 | 992 | — |
| 1880 | 979 | −1.3% |
| 1890 | 921 | −5.9% |
| 1900 | 995 | +8.0% |
| 1910 | 1,083 | +8.8% |
| 1921 | 1,132 | +4.5% |
| 1930 | 1,134 | +0.2% |
| 1950 | 916 | −19.2% |
| 1961 | 918 | +0.2% |
| 1970 | 848 | −7.6% |
| 1980 | 814 | −4.0% |
| 1991 | 794 | −2.5% |
| 2001 | 778 | −2.0% |
| 2011 | 899 | +15.6% |
| 2021 | 887 | −1.3% |
Source: Censuses
