= Javor (Klatovy District) =

- Municipality
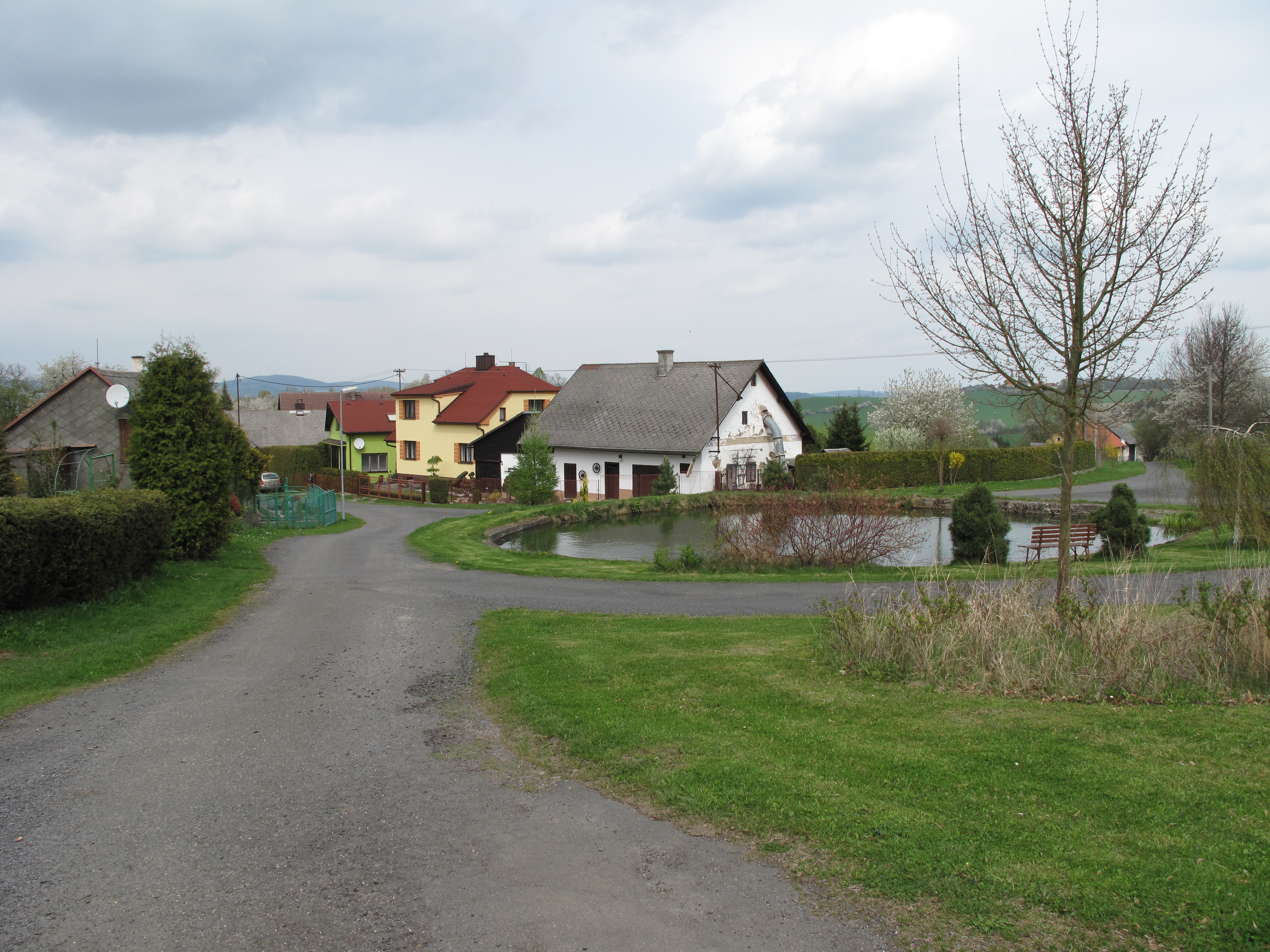
- Centre of Javor

- Location in the Czech Republic
- Coordinates: 49°19′31″N 13°14′50″E
- Country: Czech Republic
- Region: Plzeň
- District: Klatovy
- First mentioned: 1379

Area
  - Total: 4.21 km^{2} (1.63 sq mi)
- Elevation: 517 m (1,696 ft)

Population (2026-01-01)
  - Total: 82
  - Density: 19/km^{2} (50/sq mi)
- Time zone: UTC+1 (CET)
  - Summer (DST): UTC+2 (CEST)
- Postal code: 340 21
- Website: www.sumavanet.cz/javor/

Javor is a municipality and village in Klatovy District in the Plzeň Region of the Czech Republic. It has about 80 inhabitants.

Javor lies approximately 8 kilometres (5 mi) south of Klatovy, 48 km (30 mi) south of Plzeň, and 119 km (74 mi) south-west of Prague.

== Administrative division ==
Javor consists of two municipal parts (in brackets population according to the 2021 census):

- Javor (51)
- Loučany (11)

== Demographics ==
Historical population
Year	Pop.	±%
1869	340	—
1880	313	−7.9%
1890	245	−21.7%
1900	280	+14.3%
1910	283	+1.1%
1921	279	−1.4%
1930	234	−16.1%
1950	141	−39.7%
1961	135	−4.3%
1970	124	−8.1%
1980	99	−20.2%
1991	90	−9.1%
2001	88	−2.2%
2011	77	−12.5%
2021	62	−19.5%
Source: Censuses
