= Domoraz =

- Municipality
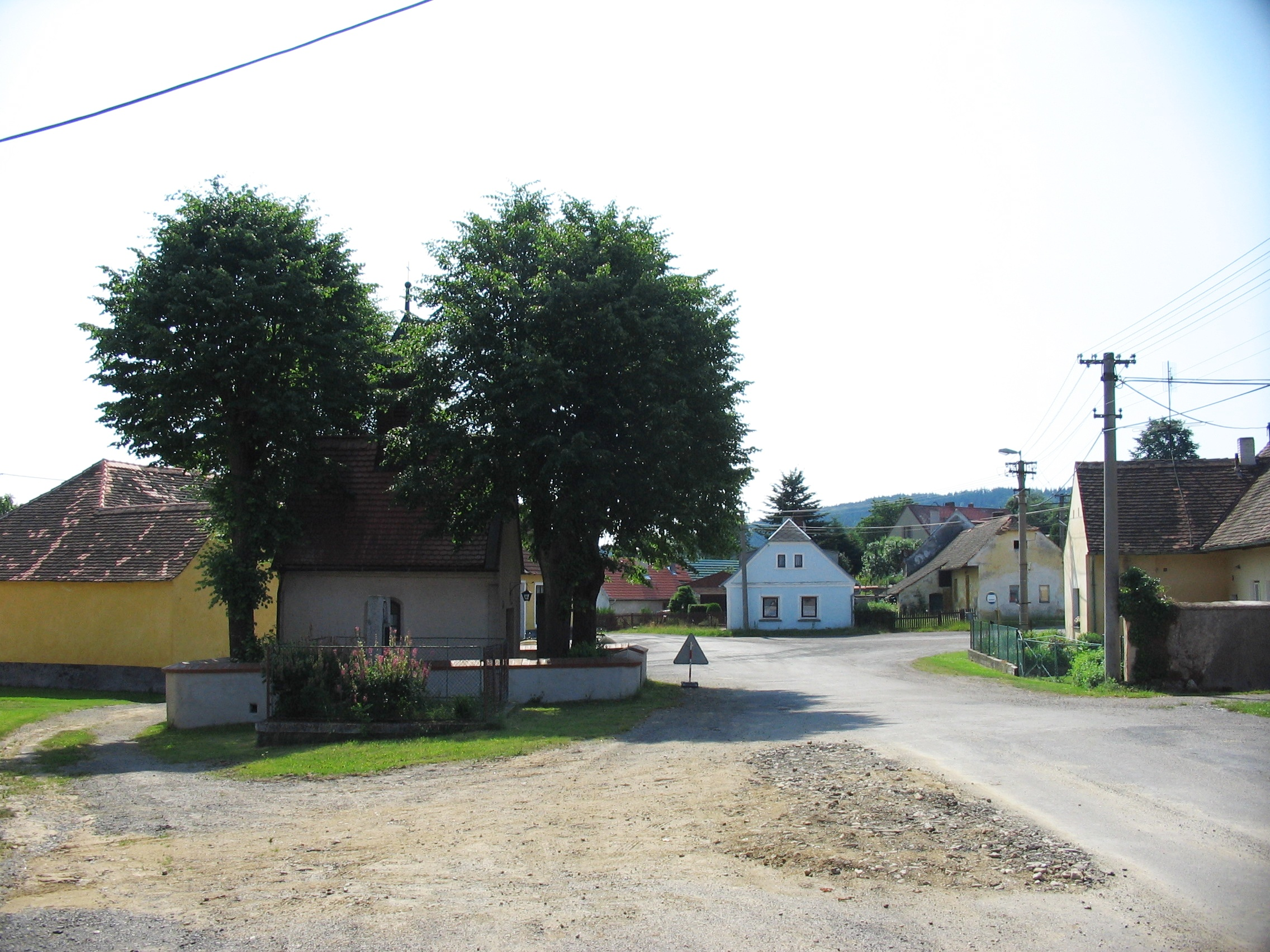
- Centre of Domoraz

- Flag Coat of arms

- Location in the Czech Republic
- Coordinates: 49°15′3″N 13°39′43″E
- Country: Czech Republic
- Region: Plzeň
- District: Klatovy
- First mentioned: 1045

Area
  - Total: 3.83 km^{2} (1.48 sq mi)
- Elevation: 515 m (1,690 ft)

Population (2026-01-01)
  - Total: 54
  - Density: 14/km^{2} (37/sq mi)
- Time zone: UTC+1 (CET)
  - Summer (DST): UTC+2 (CEST)
- Postal code: 342 01
- Website: www.domoraz.cz

Domoraz is a municipality and village in Klatovy District in the Plzeň Region of the Czech Republic. It has about 50 inhabitants.

Domoraz lies approximately 33 kilometres (21 mi) south-east of Klatovy, 60 km (37 mi) south of Plzeň, and 108 km (67 mi) south-west of Prague.

== Demographics ==
Historical population
Year	Pop.	±%
1869	237	—
1880	261	+10.1%
1890	284	+8.8%
1900	260	−8.5%
1910	266	+2.3%
1921	284	+6.8%
1930	241	−15.1%
1950	190	−21.2%
1961	177	−6.8%
1970	138	−22.0%
1980	109	−21.0%
1991	82	−24.8%
2001	72	−12.2%
2011	50	−30.6%
2021	56	+12.0%
Source: Censuses
