= Ježovy =

- Municipality
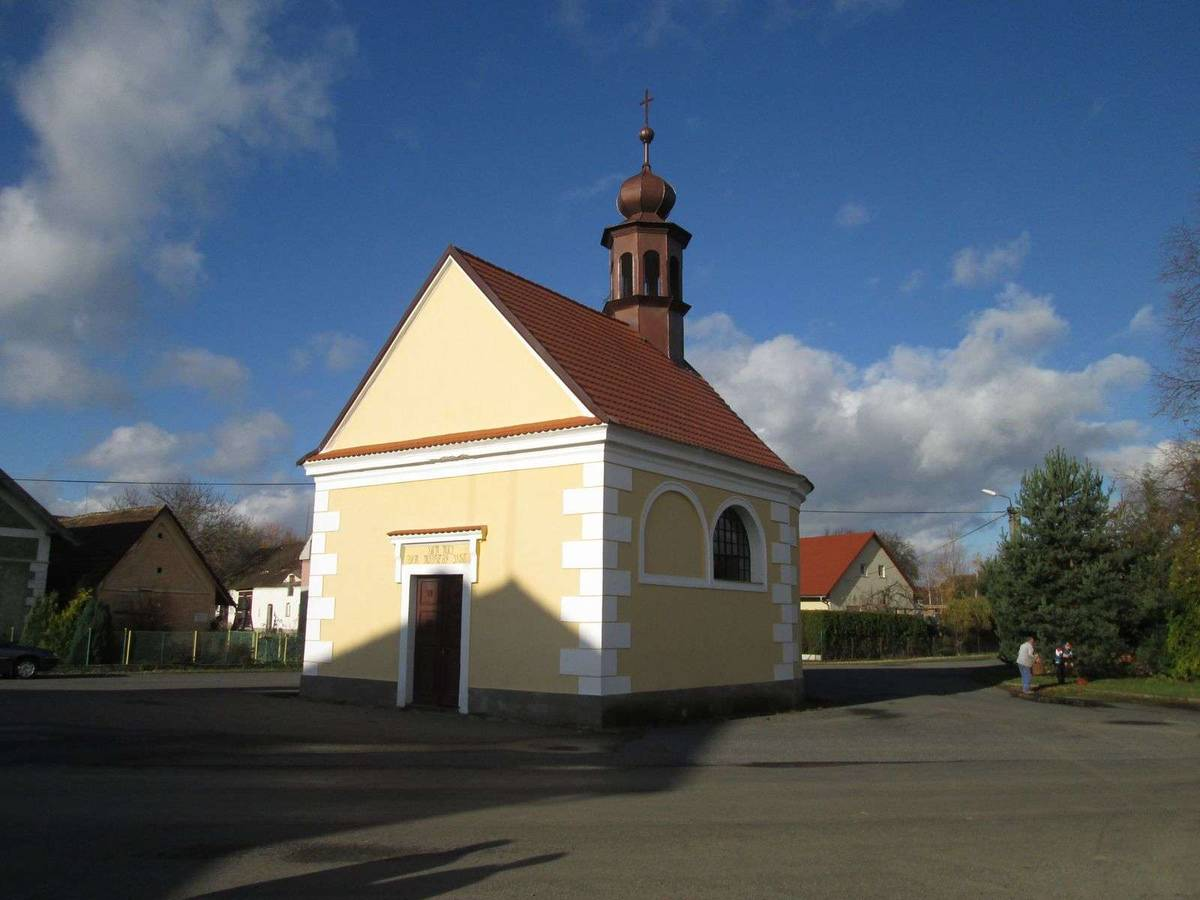
- Chapel of Saint John of Nepomuk

- Flag Coat of arms

- Location in the Czech Republic
- Coordinates: 49°29′28″N 13°13′42″E
- Country: Czech Republic
- Region: Plzeň
- District: Klatovy
- First mentioned: 1251

Area
  - Total: 11.48 km^{2} (4.43 sq mi)
- Elevation: 458 m (1,503 ft)

Population (2026-01-01)
  - Total: 207
  - Density: 18.0/km^{2} (46.7/sq mi)
- Time zone: UTC+1 (CET)
  - Summer (DST): UTC+2 (CEST)
- Postal code: 340 12
- Website: www.oujezovy.cz

Ježovy is a municipality and village in Klatovy District in the Plzeň Region of the Czech Republic. It has about 200 inhabitants.

Ježovy is located approximately 11 kilometres (7 mi) north of Klatovy, 31 km (19 mi) south of Plzeň, and 108 km (67 mi) south-west of Prague.

== Administrative division ==
Ježovy consists of three municipal parts (in brackets population according to the 2021 census):

- Ježovy (142)
- Chlumská (25)
- Trnčí (63)

== History ==
The first written mention of Ježovy is from 1251.

== Demographics ==
Historical population
Year	Pop.	±%
1869	626	—
1880	600	−4.2%
1890	559	−6.8%
1900	593	+6.1%
1910	630	+6.2%
1921	617	−2.1%
1930	580	−6.0%
1950	368	−36.6%
1961	362	−1.6%
1970	309	−14.6%
1980	301	−2.6%
1991	250	−16.9%
2001	254	+1.6%
2011	234	−7.9%
2021	230	−1.7%
Source: Censuses
