= Klatovy District =

Klatovy District Okres Klatovy
- District
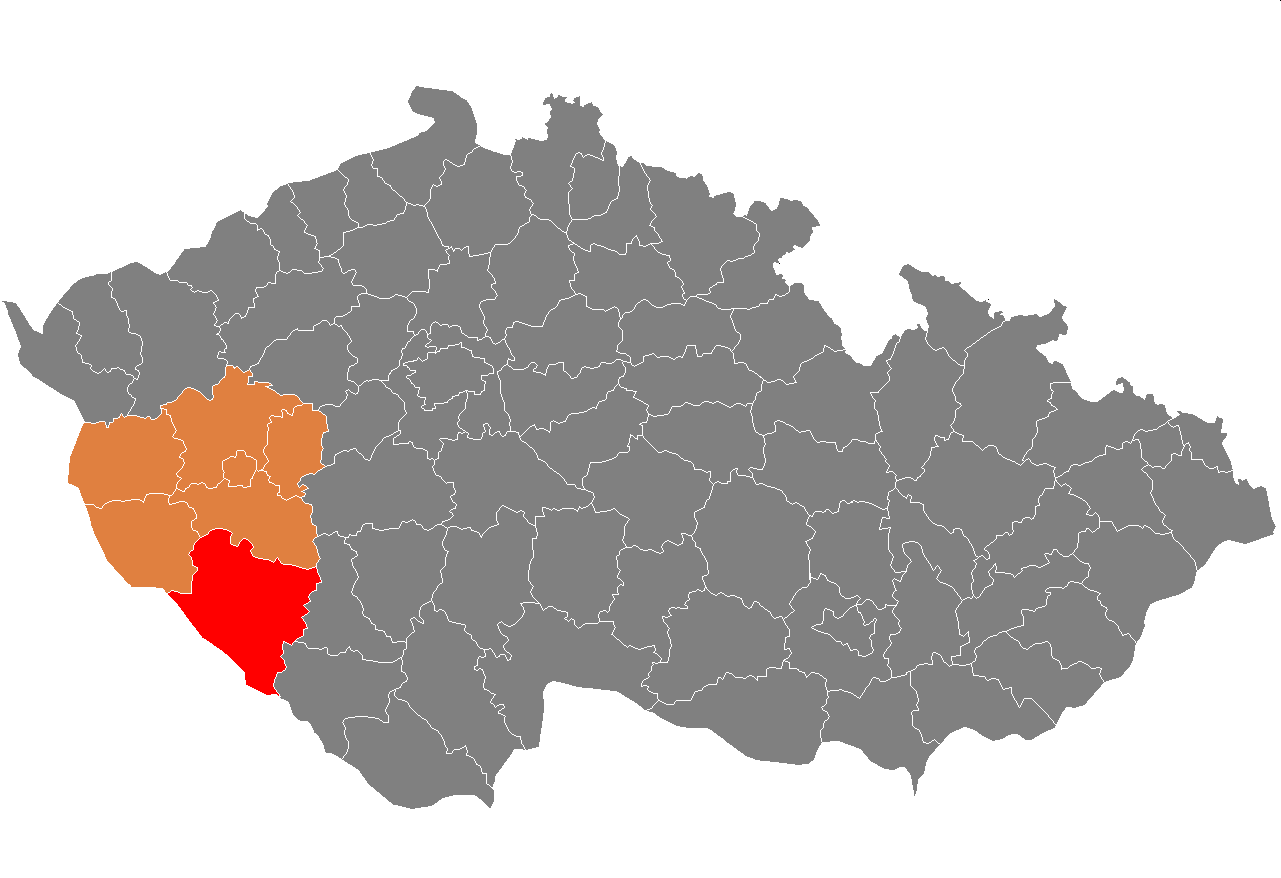
- Location in the Plzeň Region within the Czech Republic
- Coordinates: 49°16′N 13°25′E
- Country: Czech Republic
- Region: Plzeň
- Capital: Klatovy

Area
  - Total: 1,945.64 km^{2} (751.22 sq mi)

Population (2026)
  - Total: 86,710
  - Density: 44.57/km^{2} (115.4/sq mi)
- Time zone: UTC+1 (CET)
  - Summer (DST): UTC+2 (CEST)
- Municipalities: 94
- * Towns: 15
- * Market towns: 4

Klatovy District (Czech: Okres Klatovy) is a district in the Plzeň Region of the Czech Republic. Its capital is the town of Klatovy. With an area of 1,946 km^{2} (751 sq mi), it is the largest district in the country.

== Administrative division ==
Klatovy District is divided into three administrative districts of municipalities with extended competence: Klatovy, Horažďovice and Sušice.

=== List of municipalities ===
Towns are marked in bold and market towns in italics:

Běhařov - Běšiny - Bezděkov - Biřkov - Bolešiny - Břežany - Budětice - Bukovník - Čachrov - Černíkov - Červené Poříčí - Chanovice - Chlistov - Chudenice - Chudenín - Číhaň - Čímice - Dešenice - Dlažov - Dlouhá Ves - Dobršín - Dolany - Domoraz - Dražovice - Frymburk - Hamry - Hartmanice - Hejná - Hlavňovice - Hnačov - Horažďovice - Horská Kvilda - Hrádek - Hradešice - Janovice nad Úhlavou - Javor - Ježovy - Kašperské Hory - Kejnice - Klatovy - Klenová - Kolinec - Kovčín - Křenice - Kvášňovice - Lomec - Malý Bor - Maňovice - Měčín - Mezihoří - Mlýnské Struhadlo - Modrava - Mochtín - Mokrosuky - Myslív - Myslovice - Nalžovské Hory - Nehodiv - Nezamyslice - Nezdice na Šumavě - Nýrsko - Obytce - Olšany - Ostřetice - Pačejov - Petrovice u Sušice - Plánice - Podmokly - Poleň - Prášily - Předslav - Rabí - Rejštejn - Slatina - Soběšice - Srní - Strašín - Strážov - Sušice - Svéradice - Švihov - Tužice - Týnec - Újezd u Plánice - Velhartice - Velké Hydčice - Velký Bor - Vrhaveč - Vřeskovice - Zavlekov - Zborovy - Železná Ruda - Žichovice - Žihobce

== Geography ==
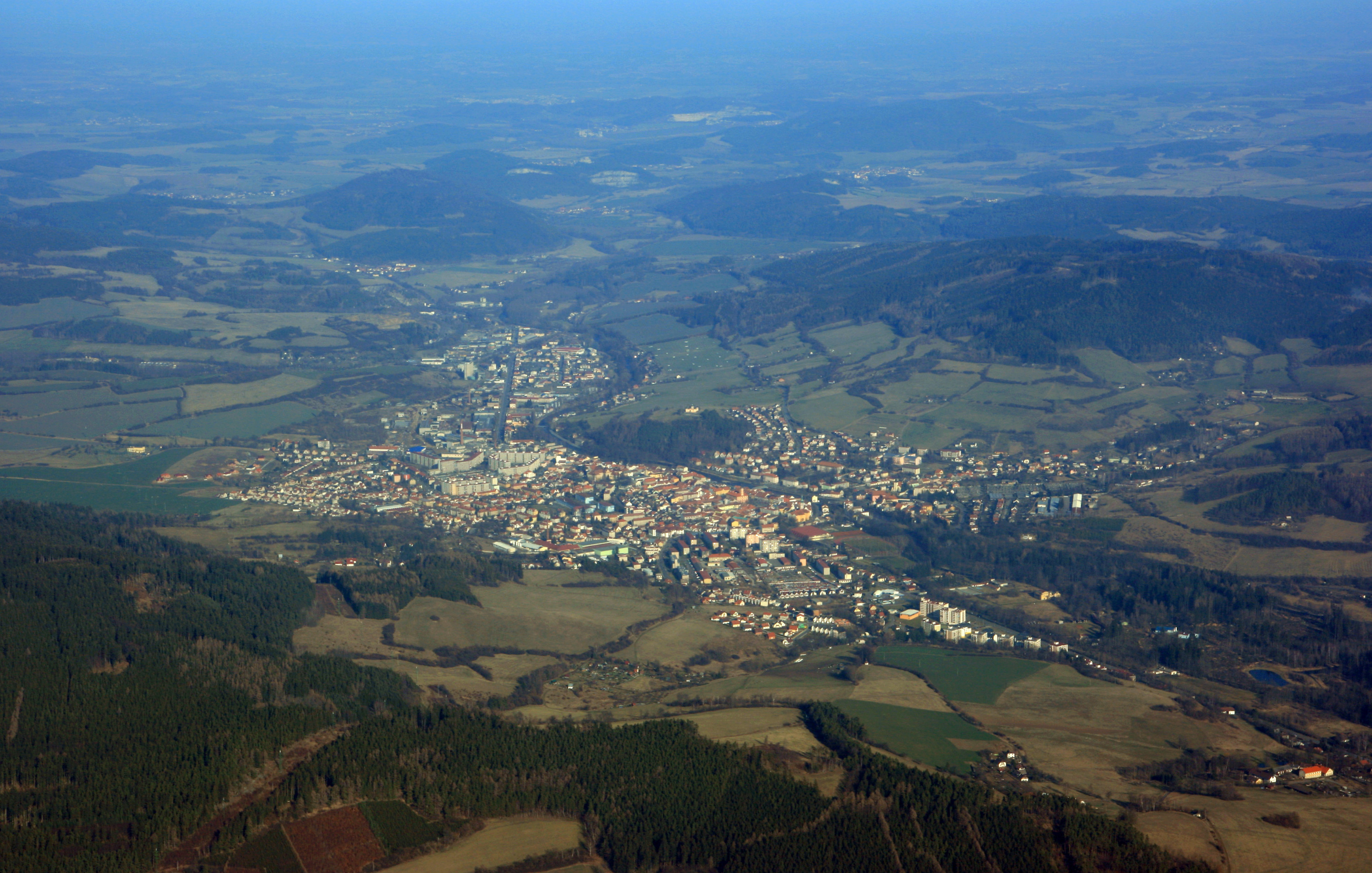
Sušice and surrounding landscape

Klatovy District borders Germany in the southwest. The landscape is very rugged. Most of the territory has a foothill character, but along the state border, the landscape is mountainous, and in the northeast, the terrain is only slightly undulating. The territory extends into five geomorphological mesoregions: Bohemian Forest Foothills (centre and east), Bohemian Forest (south and southwest), Blatná Uplands (northeast), Švihov Highlands (northwest) and Cham-Furth Depression (small part in the west). The highest point of the district and of the entire Plzeň Region is the mountain Velká Mokrůvka in Modrava with an elevation of 1,370 m (4,490 ft). The lowest point is the river bed of the Úhlava in Červené Poříčí at 362 m (1,188 ft).

Klatovy District is the largest district of the Czech Republic. From the total district area of 1,945.6 km^{2} (751.2 sq mi), agricultural land occupies 895.1 km^{2} (345.6 sq mi), forests occupy 845.1 km^{2} (326.3 sq mi), and water area occupies 34.3 km^{2} (13.2 sq mi). Forests cover 43.4% of the district's area.

The area is rich in rivers. Both sources of the Otava River, Křemelná and Vydra, originate here. The Otava then continues to flow across the eastern part of the district. Similarly important is the Úhlava, which also springs here and flows through the western part of the district. The other important rives that springs here are Regen and Úslava.

The largest bodies of water are the Nýrsko Reservoir with an area of 148 ha (370 acres) and the fishpond Kovčínský rybník with an area of 106 ha (260 acres). Two of the few natural lakes in the country, Černé jezero and Čertovo jezero, lie within the district.

In the south is located a large part of the Šumava National Park. The territory in the southwest falls under the protection of the Šumava Protected Landscape Area.

== Demographics ==
Historical population

Year	Pop.	±%
1869	142,333	—
1880	151,497	+6.4%
1890	149,312	−1.4%
1900	149,373	+0.0%
1910	151,267	+1.3%

Year	Pop.	±%
1921	149,491	−1.2%
1930	143,121	−4.3%
1950	99,947	−30.2%
1961	99,042	−0.9%
1970	93,982	−5.1%

Year	Pop.	±%
1980	92,202	−1.9%
1991	89,666	−2.8%
2001	87,943	−1.9%
2011	85,726	−2.5%
2021	83,658	−2.4%

Source: Censuses

=== Most populous municipalities ===
Name	Population	Area (km^{2})
Klatovy	22,921	81
Sušice	10,689	46
Horažďovice	5,056	43
Nýrsko	5,023	32
Janovice nad Úhlavou	2,455	28
Švihov	1,673	35
Plánice	1,627	56
Železná Ruda	1,580	80
Kolinec	1,427	49
Strážov	1,374	36

== Economy ==
The largest employers with headquarters in Klatovy District and at least 500 employees are:

Economic entity	Location	Number of employees	Main activity
Klatovy Hospital	Klatovy	1,000–1,499	Health care
Pfeifer Holz	Chanovice	500–999	Manufacture of wooden products
Novares CZ Janovice	Janovice nad Úhlavou	500–999	Manufacture of plastics products for automotive industry
Rodenstock ČR	Klatovy	500–999	Manufacture of spectacle lenses
Západočeské konzumní družstvo Sušice	Sušice	500–999	Retail sale

== Transport ==
There are no motorways passing through the district. The most important road is the I/27 (part of European route E53) from Plzeň to the Czech–German border via Klatovy.

== Sights ==
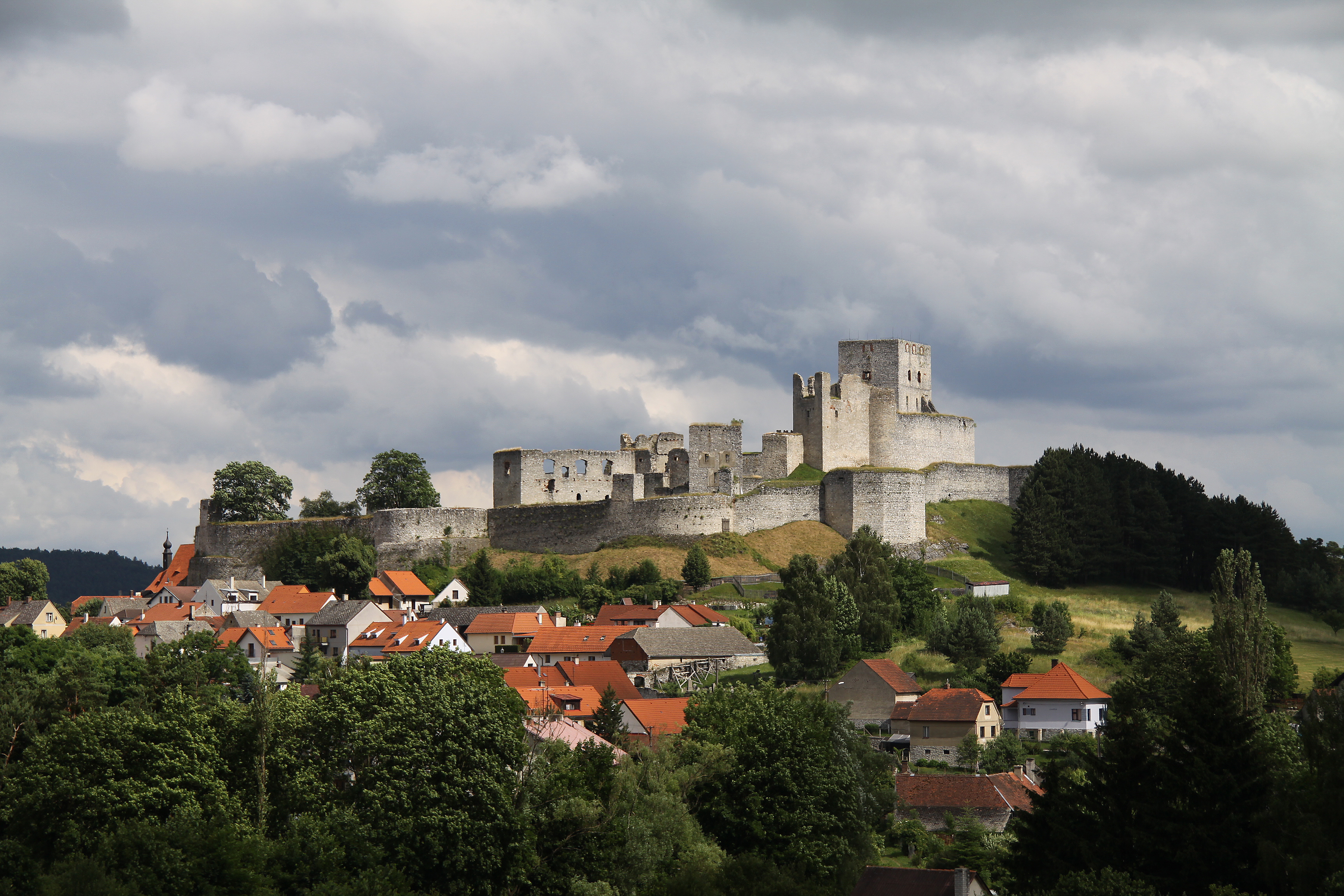
Rabí Castle

The most important monuments in the district, protected as national cultural monuments, are:

- Rabí Castle
- Švihov Castle
- Velhartice Castle
- Červené Poříčí Castle
- Týnec Castle
- Church of the Immaculate Conception of the Virgin Mary and of Saint Ignatius with catacombs and the Latin school

The best-preserved settlements and landscapes, protected as monument reservations and monument zones, are:

- Dobršín (monument reservation)
- Horažďovice
- Kašperské Hory
- Klatovy
- Rabí
- Strážov
- Sušice
- Velhartice
- Břežany
- Hradešice
- Chanovice
- Ostřetice
- Poleň
- Velké Hydčice
- Chudenicko landscape

Five of the ten most visited tourist destinations of the Plzeň Region are located in Klatovy District. The most visited tourist destinations are the Rabí Castle, Velhartice Castle, Klenová Castle, Kašperk Castle and Švihov Castle.
