= Dražovice (Klatovy District) =

- Municipality
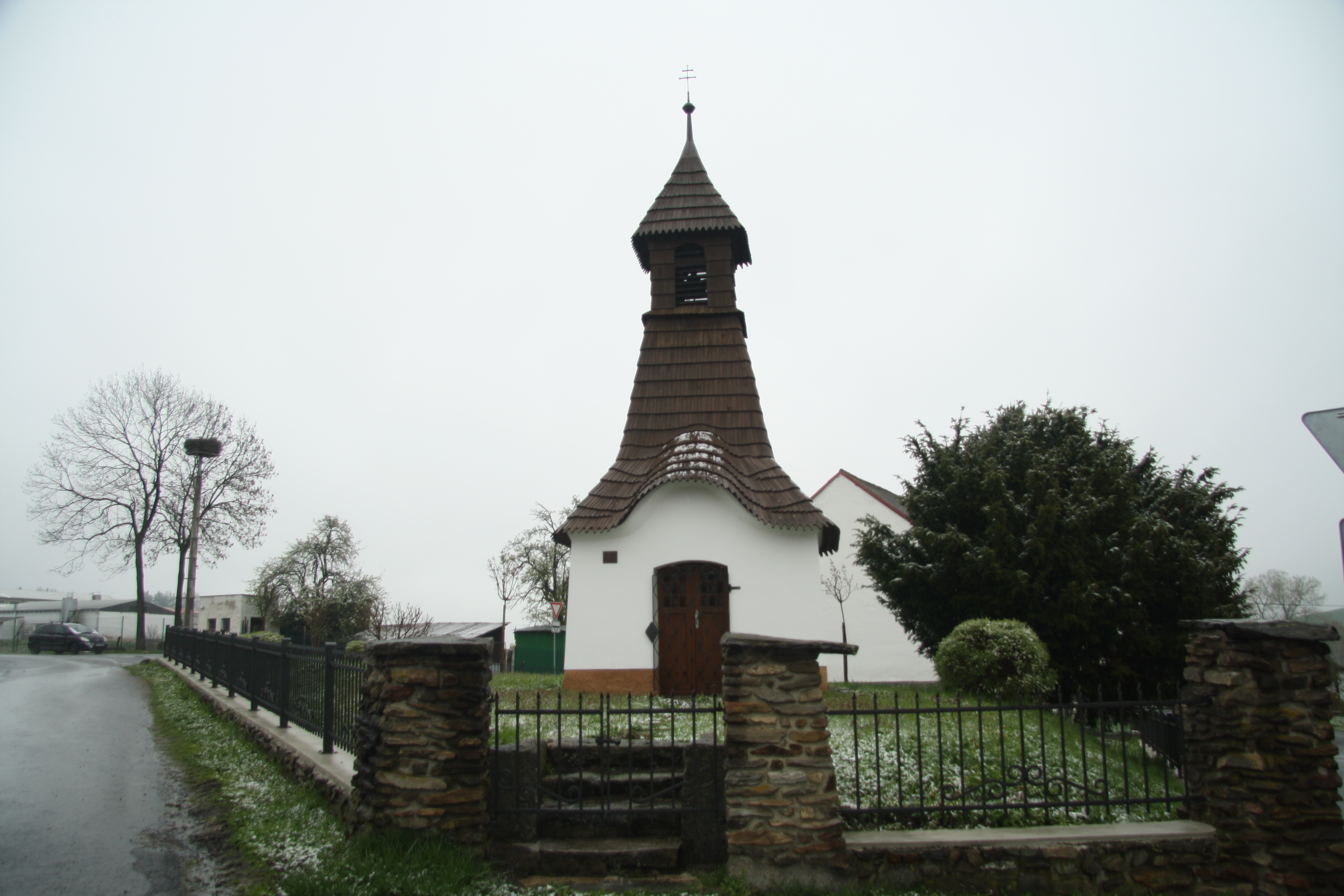
- Chapel of Saint Wenceslaus

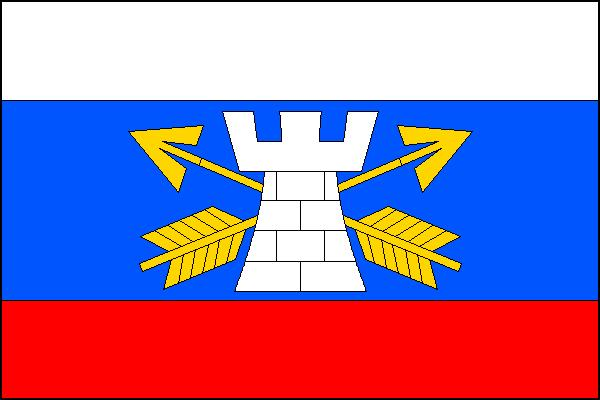
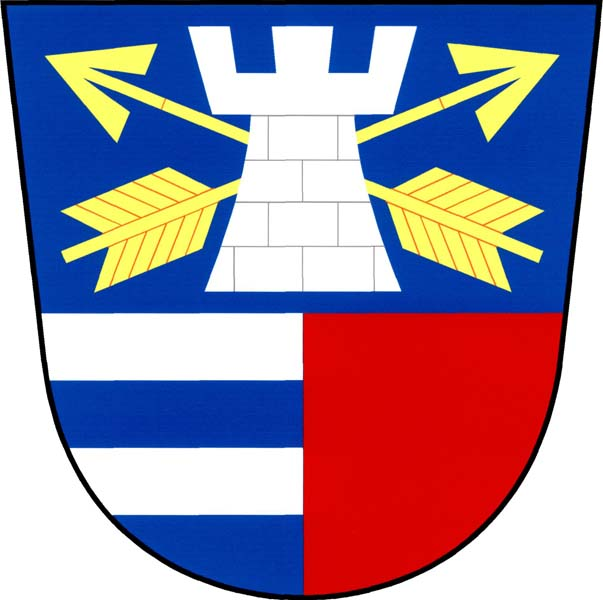
- Flag Coat of arms

- Location in the Czech Republic
- Coordinates: 49°13′29″N 13°36′25″E
- Country: Czech Republic
- Region: Plzeň
- District: Klatovy
- First mentioned: 1356

Area
  - Total: 5.53 km^{2} (2.14 sq mi)
- Elevation: 483 m (1,585 ft)

Population (2026-01-01)
  - Total: 167
  - Density: 30.2/km^{2} (78.2/sq mi)
- Time zone: UTC+1 (CET)
  - Summer (DST): UTC+2 (CEST)
- Postal code: 342 01
- Website: www.drazoviceususice.cz

Dražovice is a municipality and village in Klatovy District in the Plzeň Region of the Czech Republic. It has about 200 inhabitants.

Dražovice lies approximately 30 kilometres (19 mi) south-east of Klatovy, 61 km (38 mi) south of Plzeň, and 113 km (70 mi) south-west of Prague.

== Demographics ==
Historical population
Year	Pop.	±%
1869	491	—
1880	512	+4.3%
1890	491	−4.1%
1900	501	+2.0%
1910	460	−8.2%
1921	458	−0.4%
1930	445	−2.8%
1950	302	−32.1%
1961	290	−4.0%
1970	234	−19.3%
1980	209	−10.7%
1991	165	−21.1%
2001	153	−7.3%
2011	163	+6.5%
2021	143	−12.3%
Source: Censuses
