= Biřkov =

- Municipality
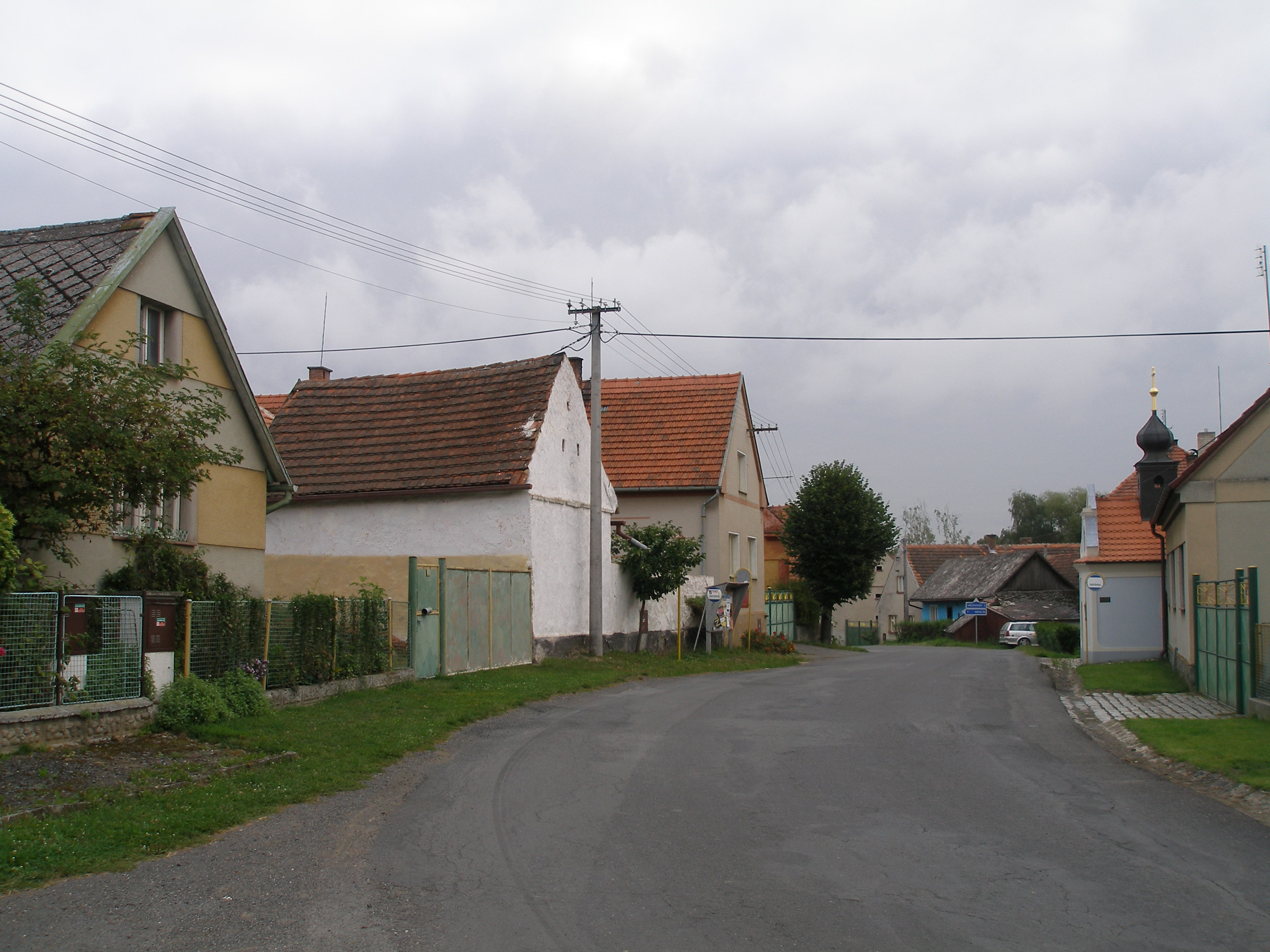
- Main street

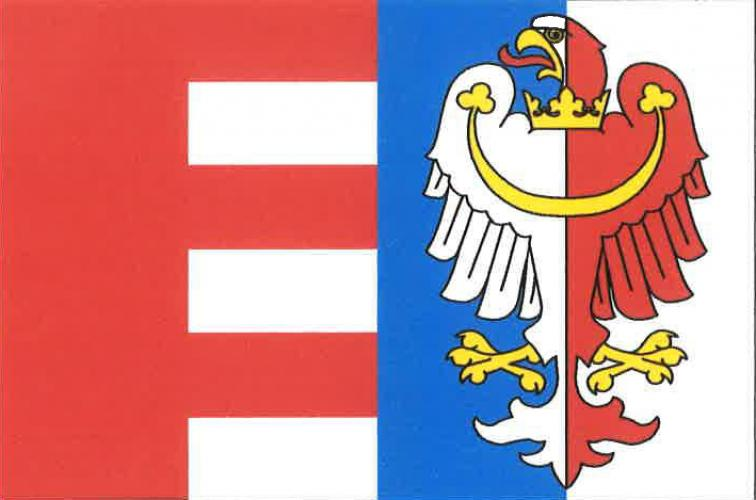
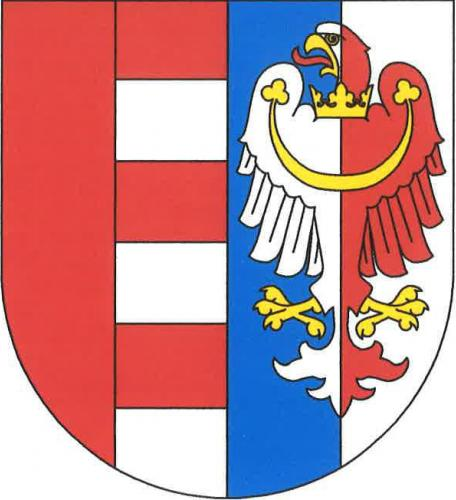
- Flag Coat of arms

- Location in the Czech Republic
- Coordinates: 49°31′5″N 13°13′49″E
- Country: Czech Republic
- Region: Plzeň
- District: Klatovy
- First mentioned: 1339

Area
  - Total: 5.51 km^{2} (2.13 sq mi)
- Elevation: 418 m (1,371 ft)

Population (2026-01-01)
  - Total: 142
  - Density: 25.8/km^{2} (66.7/sq mi)
- Time zone: UTC+1 (CET)
  - Summer (DST): UTC+2 (CEST)
- Postal code: 334 01, 340 12
- Website: www.birkov.cz

Biřkov is a municipality and village in Klatovy District in the Plzeň Region of the Czech Republic. It has about 100 inhabitants.

Biřkov lies approximately 14 kilometres (9 mi) north of Klatovy, 28 km (17 mi) south of Plzeň, and 107 km (66 mi) south-west of Prague.

== Administrative division ==
Biřkov consists of two municipal parts (in brackets population according to the 2021 census):

- Biřkov (127)
- Zderaz (7)

== Demographics ==
Historical population
Year	Pop.	±%
1869	243	—
1880	234	−3.7%
1890	237	+1.3%
1900	266	+12.2%
1910	269	+1.1%
1921	288	+7.1%
1930	291	+1.0%
1950	203	−30.2%
1961	198	−2.5%
1970	184	−7.1%
1980	190	+3.3%
1991	161	−15.3%
2001	134	−16.8%
2011	137	+2.2%
2021	134	−2.2%
Source: Censuses
