= Újezdec =

Újezdec may refer to places in the Czech Republic:

- Újezdec (Jindřichův Hradec District), a municipality and village in the South Bohemian Region
- Újezdec (Mělník District), a municipality and village in the Central Bohemian Region
- Újezdec (Prachatice District), a municipality and village in the South Bohemian Region
- Újezdec (Svitavy District), a municipality and village in the Pardubice Region
- Újezdec (Uherské Hradiště District), a municipality and village in the Zlín Region
- Křížkový Újezdec, a municipality and village in the Central Bohemian Region
- Újezdec, a village and part of Bělčice in the South Bohemian Region
- Újezdec, a village and part of Bolešiny in the Plzeň Region
- Újezdec, a village and part of Číčenice in the South Bohemian Region
- Újezdec, a village and part of Horní Kruty in the Central Bohemian Region
- Újezdec, a village and part of Hřebečníky in the Central Bohemian Region
- Újezdec, a village and part of Ledce (Hradec Králové District) in the Hradec Králové Region
- Újezdec, a village and part of Lhota pod Hořičkami in the Hradec Králové Region
- Újezdec, a village and part of Mochtín in the Plzeň Region
- Újezdec, a village and part of Petrovice I in the Central Bohemian Region
- Újezdec, a village and part of Ptenín in the Plzeň Region
- Újezdec, a village and part of Smilovice (Mladá Boleslav District) in the Central Bohemian Region
- Újezdec, a village and part of Syřenov in the Pardubice Region
- Újezdec, a village and part of Uherský Brod in the Zlín Region
- Přerov VI-Újezdec, a village and part of Přerov in the Olomouc Region

== See also ==
- Újezd (disambiguation)
