= Neusiedl =

Neusiedl may refer to:

- Klein-Neusiedl, a municipality in the district of Wien-Umgebung in Lower Austria, Austria
- Neusiedl an der Zaya, a town in the district of Gänserndorf in the state of Lower Austria
- Lake Neusiedl, in central Europe
- Neusiedl am See, a town in Burgenland, Austria
- Neusiedl am See District, a district of the state of Burgenland in Austria
- SC Neusiedl am See 1919, an Austrian football club founded in 1919

== See also ==
- Neusiedler (disambiguation)
- Novosedly (disambiguation) (Czech form)
