= Neusiedler =

Neusiedler may refer to:

- Lake Neusiedl
- Hans Neusidler (circa 1508/9 – 1563), Hungarian-German composer and lutenist

== See also ==
- Neusiedl (disambiguation)
- Novosedly (disambiguation) (Czech form)
