= Přestavlky =

Přestavlky may refer to places in the Czech Republic:

- Přestavlky (Chrudim District), a municipality and village in the Pardubice Region
- Přestavlky (Litoměřice District), a municipality and village in the Ústí nad Labem Region
- Přestavlky (Plzeň-South District), a municipality and village in the Plzeň Region
- Přestavlky (Přerov District), a municipality and village in the Olomouc Region
- Přestavlky u Čerčan, a municipality and village in the Central Bohemian Region
- Přestavlky, a village and part of Borovnice (Rychnov nad Kněžnou District) in the Hradec Králové Region
- Přestavlky, a village and part of Horní Kruty in the Central Bohemian Region
- Přestavlky, a village and part of Sedlec-Prčice in the Central Bohemian Region
- Přestavlky, a village and part of Tršice in the Olomouc Region
