= Novosedly =

Novosedly may refer to places in the Czech Republic:

- Novosedly (Břeclav District), a municipality and village in the South Moravian Region
- Novosedly (Strakonice District), a municipality and village in the South Bohemian Region
- Novosedly, a village and part of Dívčice in the South Bohemian Region
- Novosedly, a village and part of Hřebečníky in the Central Bohemian Region
- Novosedly, a village and part of Kájov in the South Bohemian Region
- Novosedly, a hamlet and part of Nemanice in the Plzeň Region
- Novosedly, a village and part of Pšov in the Karlovy Vary Region
- Novosedly nad Nežárkou, a municipality and village and municipality in the South Bohemian Region
- Dolní Novosedly, a municipality and village in the South Bohemian Region
