= Ferdinand Johann von Morzin =

Czech nobleman and Austrian commander during French Revolutionary Wars (1756–1805)

- Born: 1756; Ptenín, Bohemia, Habsburg monarchy
- Died: 27 February 1805 (aged 48–49); Prague, Bohemia, Austrian Empire
- Relatives: Peter Prokop of Morzin (brother)
- Military career
- Allegiance: Habsburg monarchy
- Branch: Infantry
- Service years: 1770/71–1805
- Rank: Feldmarschallleutnant
- Conflicts: French Revolutionary Wars
- Awards: Military Order of Maria Theresa (Knight's Cross); Inhaber of the Infantry Regiment N°54
- Other work: Imperial-Royal Chamberlain

Count Ferdinand Johann von Morzin (Czech: Ferdinand Jan hrabě z Morzinu; 1756 – 27 February 1805) was a Czech nobleman and an Austrian infantry commander during the French Revolutionary Wars.

== Biography ==
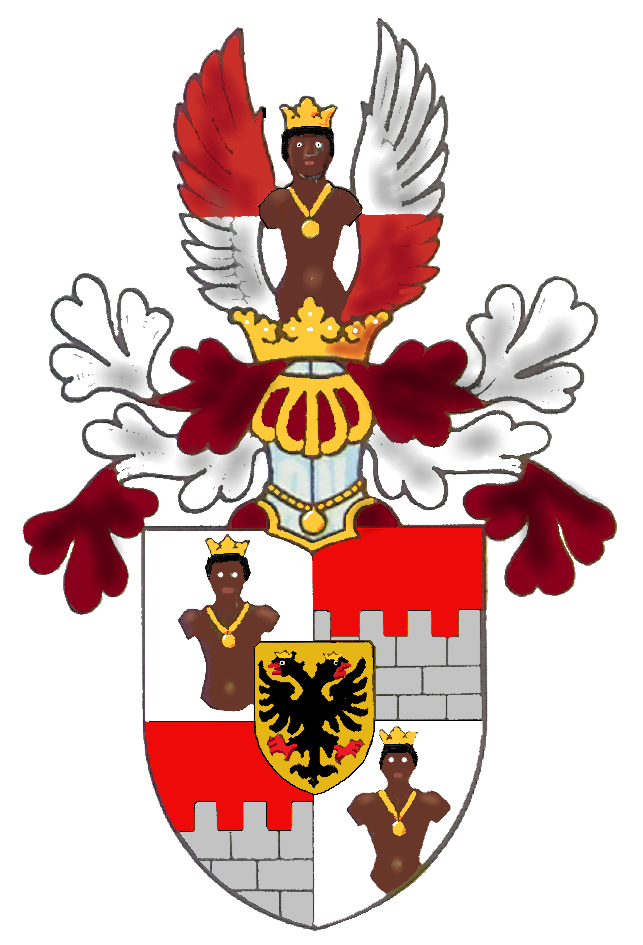
Von Morzin coat of arms

He was the son of Count Karl Joseph of Morzin (d. 1783) and Wilhelmine Baroness von Raisky. He entered the army at the age of 14 and fought as a captain in the Austro-Turkish War (1788–1791), after which he was promoted to lieutenant colonel and given command of a grenadier battalion.

He led his battalion to the Bishopric of Liège in 1790, to suppress the Liège Revolution. In 1792, he fought in the Low Countries against the French and distinguished himself in the engagement at Florennes (May 1792), the Battles of Neerwinden (18 March 1793), Le Cateau (26 April 1794), and Erquelinnes (24 May 1794). At the latter location, he earned the Knight's Cross of the Military Order of Maria Theresa.

The Count also participated in the 1795 campaign with the Army of the Rhine, was promoted to Major General in 1796, and to Lieutenant Field Marshal in 1799. After the Treaty of Lunéville, he returned to Prague as a divisional commander, where he died at the young age of 49, after serving the state with distinction for 35 years.
