= Smilovice (Mladá Boleslav District) =

- Municipality
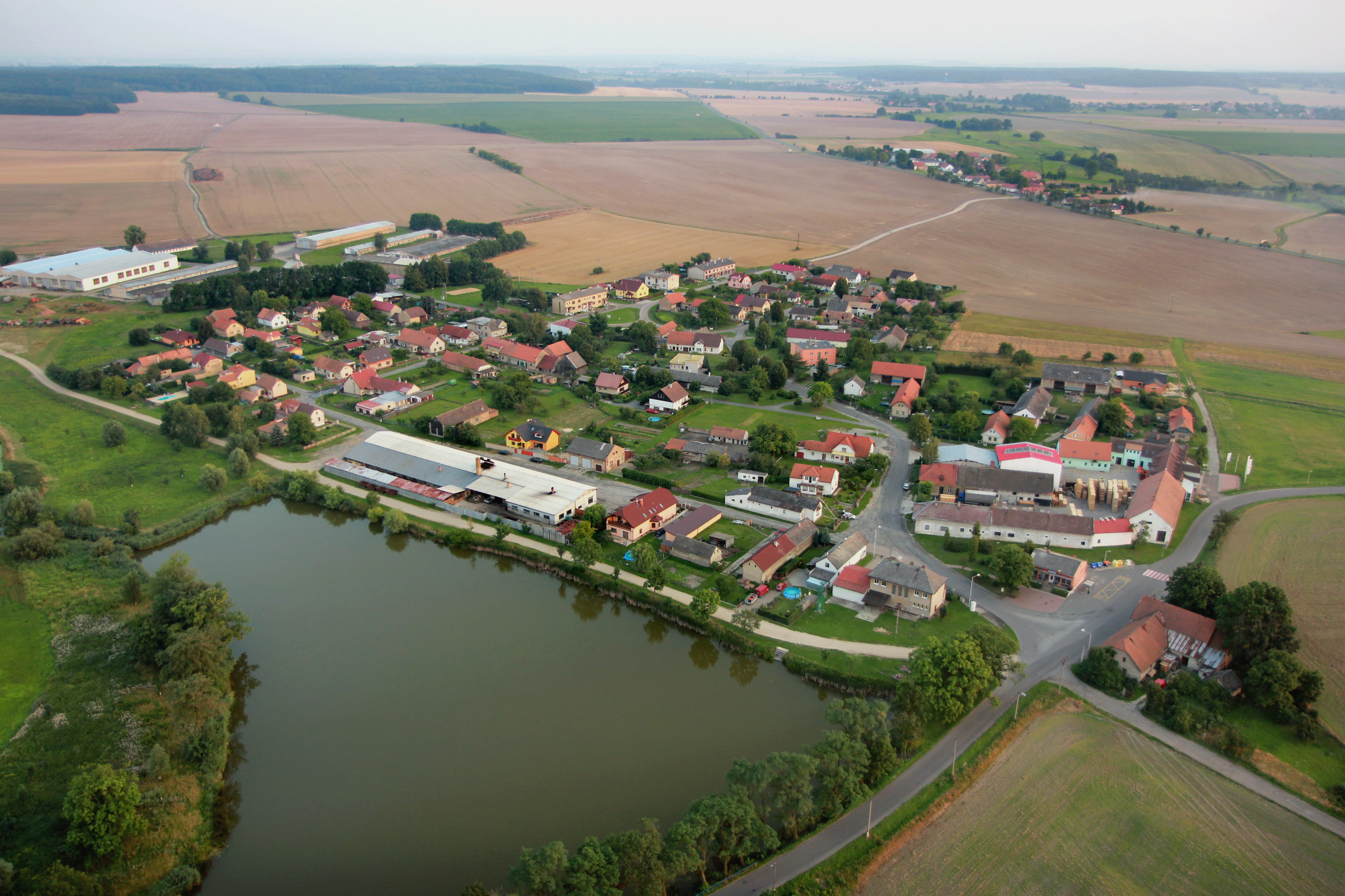
- Aerial view

- Location in the Czech Republic
- Coordinates: 50°18′24″N 14°57′40″E
- Country: Czech Republic
- Region: Central Bohemian
- District: Mladá Boleslav
- First mentioned: 1255

Area
  - Total: 14.93 km^{2} (5.76 sq mi)
- Elevation: 207 m (679 ft)

Population (2026-01-01)
  - Total: 819
  - Density: 54.9/km^{2} (142/sq mi)
- Time zone: UTC+1 (CET)
  - Summer (DST): UTC+2 (CEST)
- Postal code: 294 42
- Website: www.obecsmilovice.cz

Smilovice is a municipality and village in Mladá Boleslav District in the Central Bohemian Region of the Czech Republic. It has about 800 inhabitants.

== Administrative division ==
Smilovice consists of five municipal parts (in brackets population according to the 2021 census):

- Smilovice (199)
- Bratronice (91)
- Rejšice (238)
- Újezd (109)
- Újezdec (75)

== Etymology ==
The name is derived from the personal name Smil, meaning "the village of Smil's people".

== Geography ==
Smilovice is located about 12 kilometres (7 mi) south of Mladá Boleslav and 37 km (23 mi) northeast of Prague. It lies in the Jizera Table. The highest point is at 262 m (860 ft) above sea level. The Vlkava River flows through the municipality.

== History ==
The first written mention of Smilovice is from 1388. The oldest part of today's municipality is Rejšice, first mentioned in 1255. The villages of Újezd and Újezdec were first mentioned in 1383. The modern municipality was created in 1973 by joining the formerly independent municipalities of Rejšice, Újezd and Újezdec to Smilovice.

== Demographics ==
Historical population

Year	Pop.	±%
1869	885	—
1880	959	+8.4%
1890	1,043	+8.8%
1900	1,024	−1.8%
1910	1,148	+12.1%

Year	Pop.	±%
1921	1,146	−0.2%
1930	1,190	+3.8%
1950	974	−18.2%
1961	935	−4.0%
1970	826	−11.7%

Year	Pop.	±%
1980	679	−17.8%
1991	595	−12.4%
2001	566	−4.9%
2011	612	+8.1%
2021	712	+16.3%

Source: Censuses

== Transport ==
The I/38 road (the section from Mladá Boleslav to Nymburk) passes through the municipality.

The railway line Mladá Boleslav–Nymburk runs through the municipality, but there is no train station. The municipality is served by the station in neighbouring Luštěnice.

== Sights ==
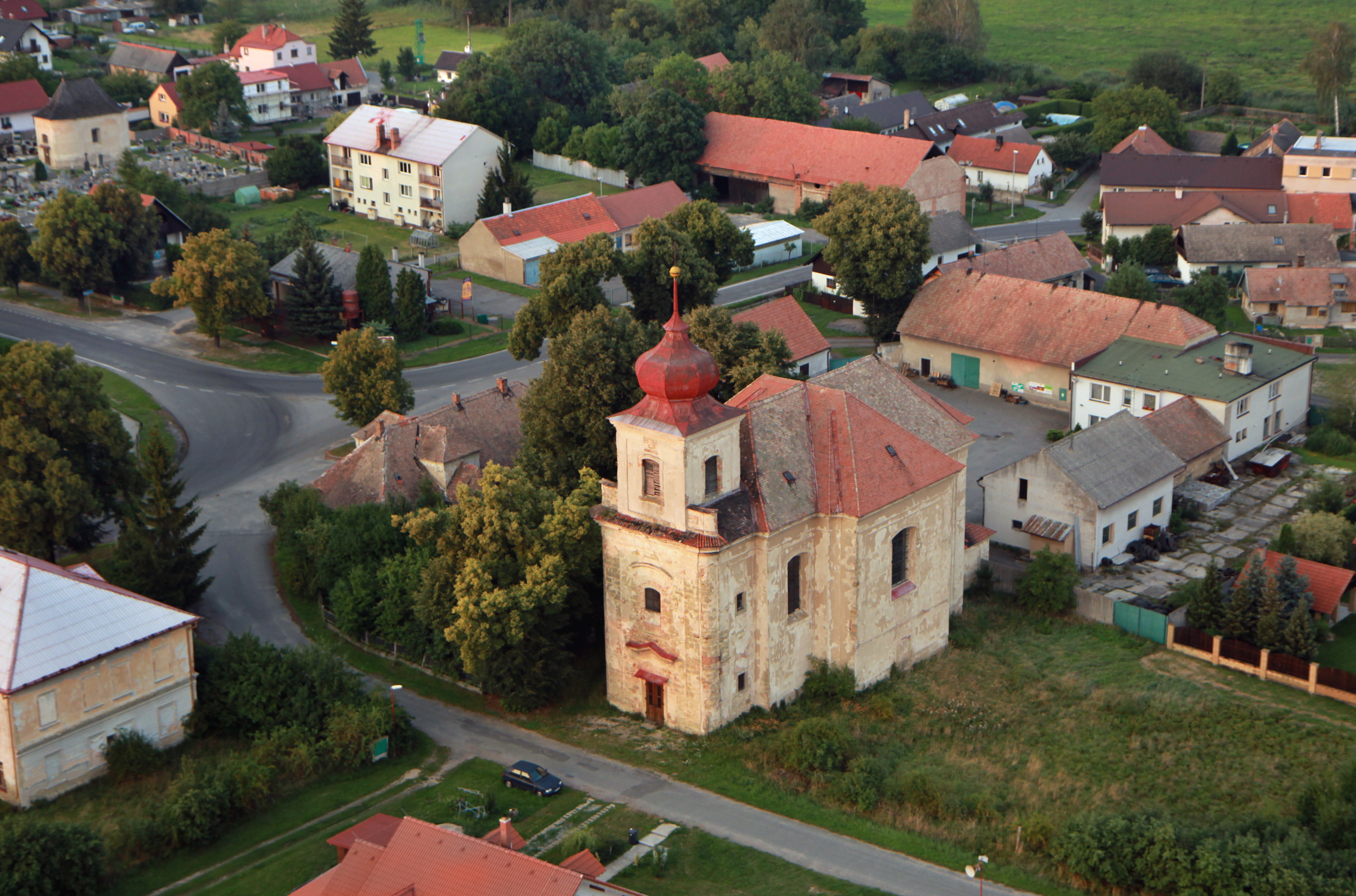
Church of Saint John of Nepomuk

The Church of Saint John of Nepomuk is located in Rejšice. It was built in the Baroque style in 1730–1735 by František Ignác Prée and František Maxmilián Kaňka.
