= Bolešiny =

- Municipality
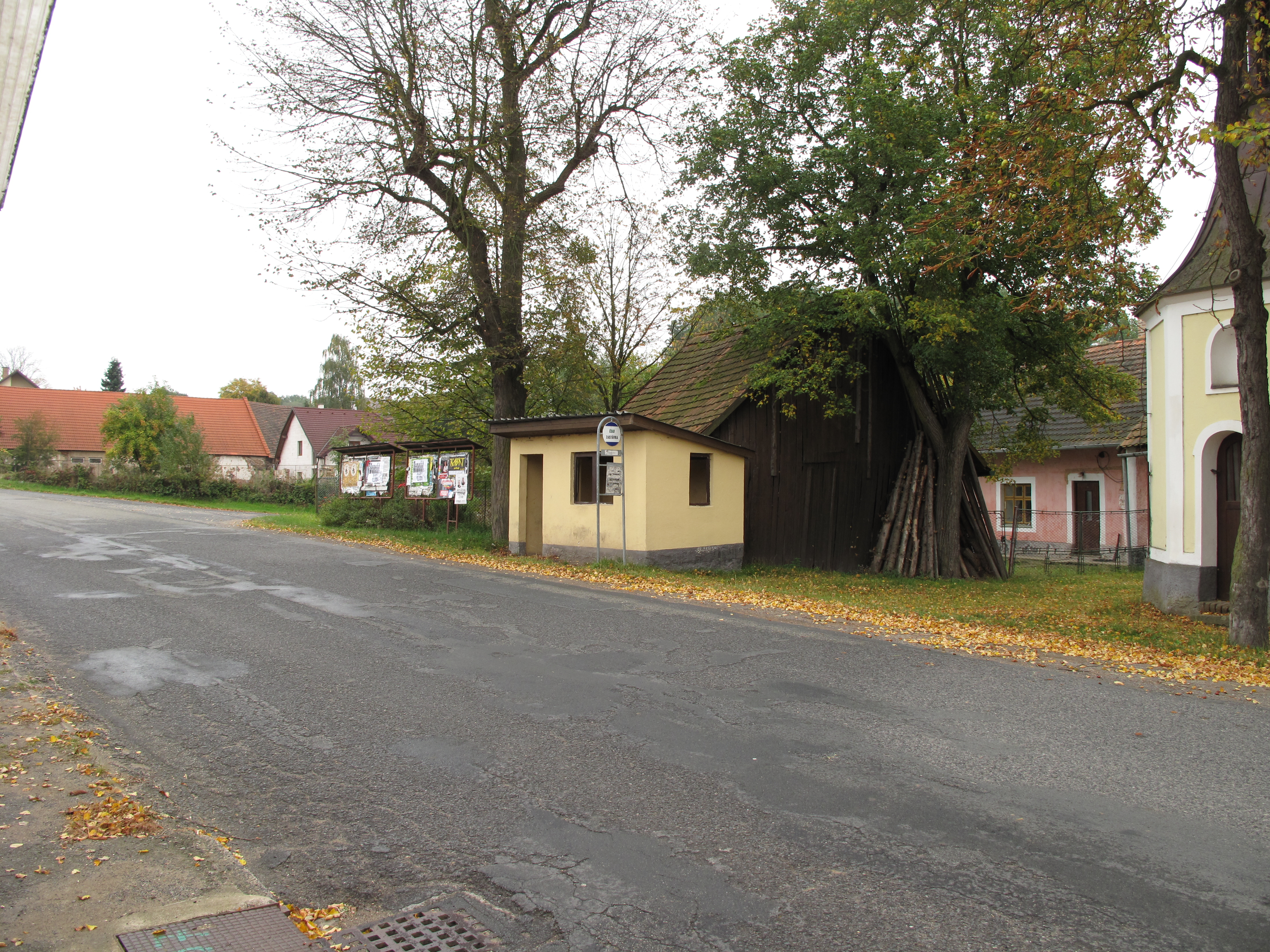
- Bus stop and a chapel

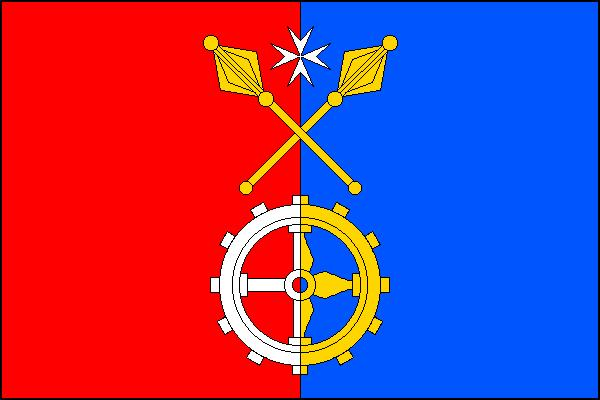
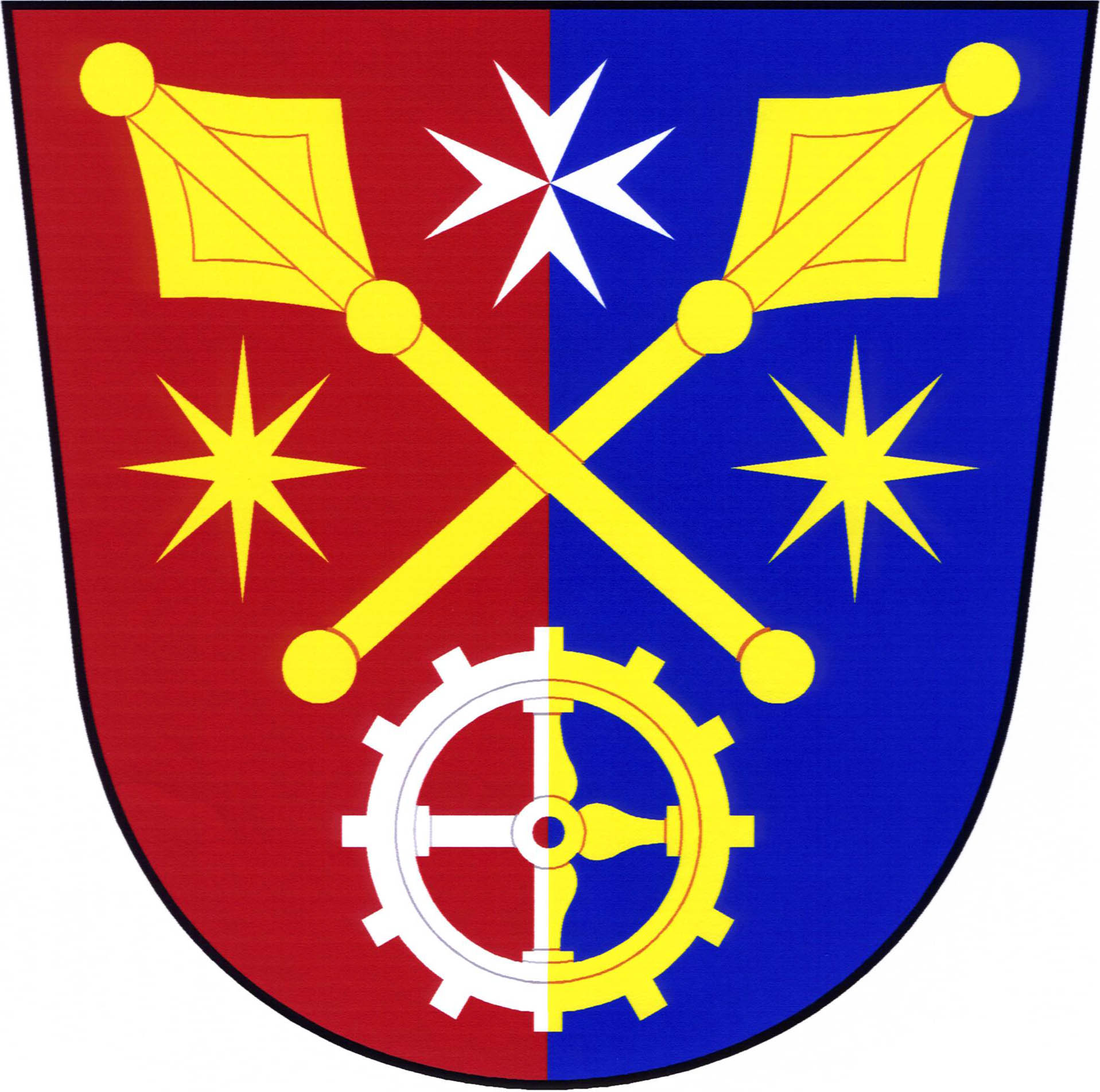
- Flag Coat of arms

- Location in the Czech Republic
- Coordinates: 49°24′36″N 13°21′42″E
- Country: Czech Republic
- Region: Plzeň
- District: Klatovy
- First mentioned: 1524

Area
  - Total: 15.66 km^{2} (6.05 sq mi)
- Elevation: 422 m (1,385 ft)

Population (2026-01-01)
  - Total: 796
  - Density: 50.8/km^{2} (132/sq mi)
- Time zone: UTC+1 (CET)
  - Summer (DST): UTC+2 (CEST)
- Postal code: 339 01
- Website: www.bolesiny.cz

Bolešiny is a municipality and village in Klatovy District in the Plzeň Region of the Czech Republic. It has about 800 inhabitants.

Bolešiny lies approximately 6 kilometres (4 mi) east of Klatovy, 38 km (24 mi) south of Plzeň, and 108 km (67 mi) south-west of Prague.

== Administrative division ==
Bolešiny consists of six municipal parts (in brackets population according to the 2021 census):

- Bolešiny (421)
- Domažličky (34)
- Kroměždice (93)
- Pečetín (66)
- Slavošovice (118)
- Újezdec (20)

== Demographics ==
Historical population
Year	Pop.	±%
1869	1,337	—
1880	1,278	−4.4%
1890	1,206	−5.6%
1900	1,223	+1.4%
1910	1,184	−3.2%
1921	1,199	+1.3%
1930	1,067	−11.0%
1950	793	−25.7%
1961	737	−7.1%
1970	629	−14.7%
1980	653	+3.8%
1991	584	−10.6%
2001	615	+5.3%
2011	704	+14.5%
2021	752	+6.8%
Source: Censuses
