= Újezdec (Svitavy District) =

- Municipality
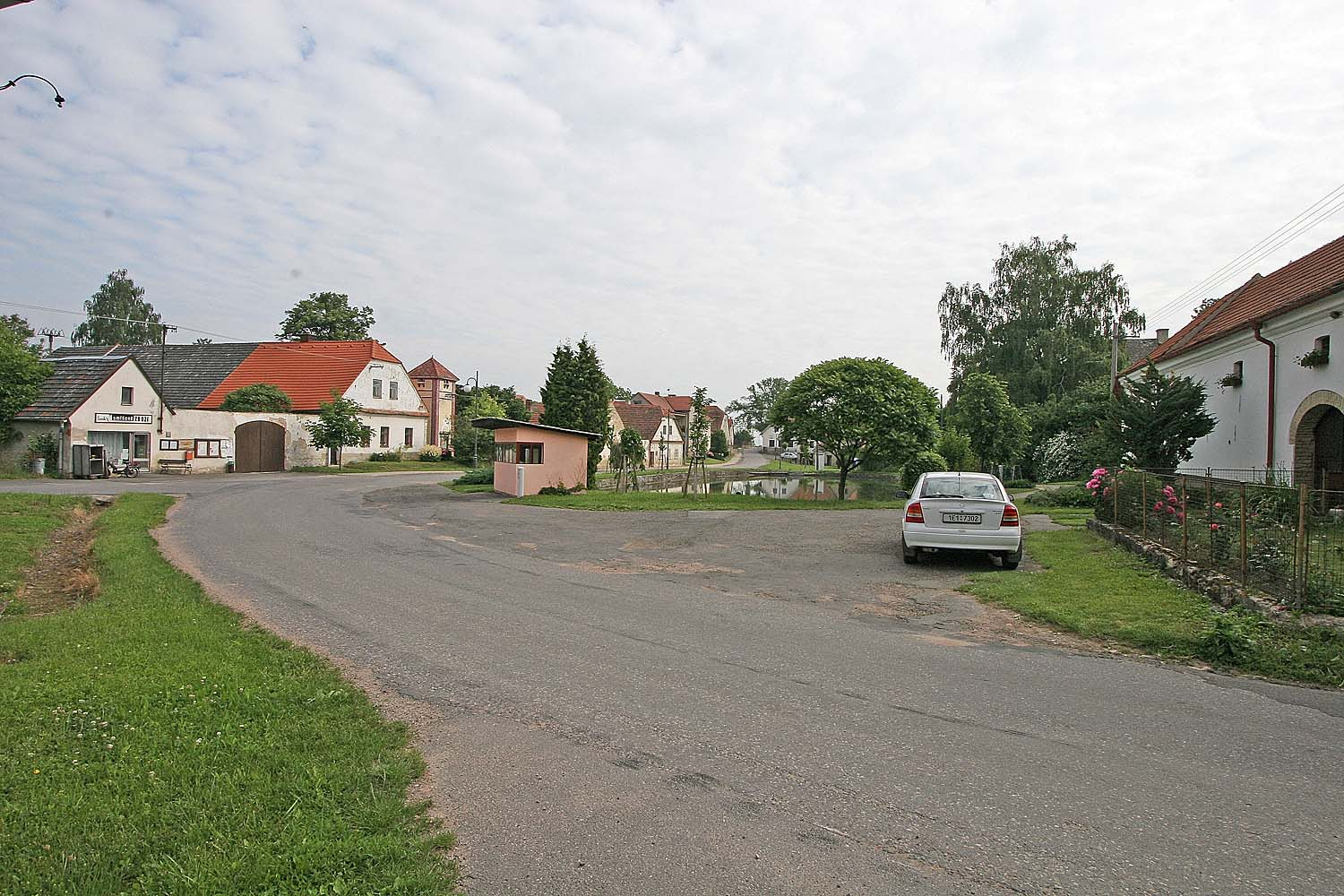
- Centre of Újezdec

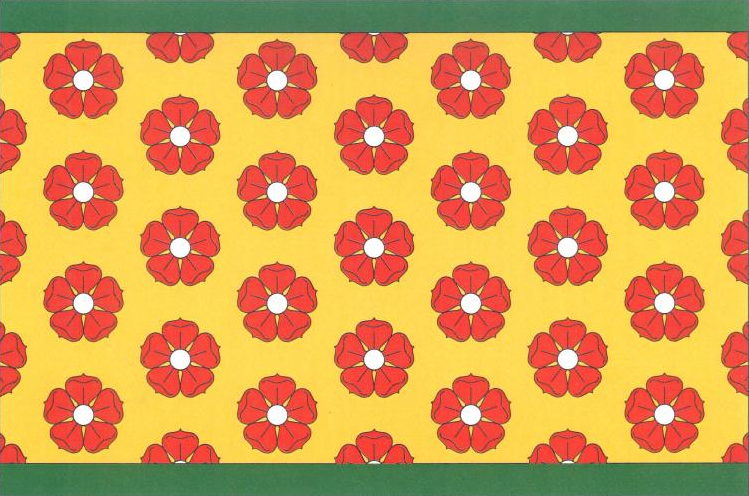
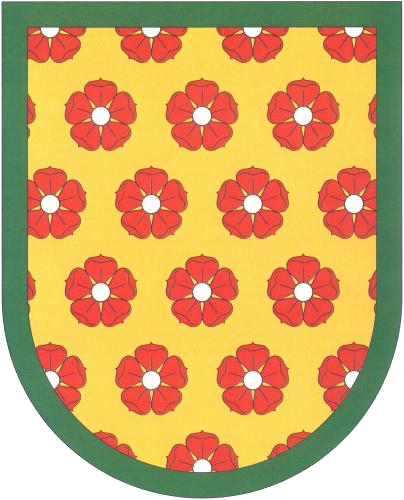
- Flag Coat of arms

- Location in the Czech Republic
- Coordinates: 49°52′40″N 16°12′22″E
- Country: Czech Republic
- Region: Pardubice
- District: Svitavy
- First mentioned: 1167

Area
  - Total: 3.46 km^{2} (1.34 sq mi)
- Elevation: 352 m (1,155 ft)

Population (2026-01-01)
  - Total: 117
  - Density: 33.8/km^{2} (87.6/sq mi)
- Time zone: UTC+1 (CET)
  - Summer (DST): UTC+2 (CEST)
- Postal code: 570 01
- Website: www.obecujezdec.cz

Újezdec is a municipality and village in Svitavy District in the Pardubice Region of the Czech Republic. It has about 100 inhabitants.

Újezdec lies approximately 24 kilometres (15 mi) north-west of Svitavy, 36 km (22 mi) south-east of Pardubice, and 130 km (81 mi) east of Prague.

== Demographics ==
Historical population
Year	Pop.	±%
1869	331	—
1880	376	+13.6%
1890	385	+2.4%
1900	349	−9.4%
1910	353	+1.1%
1921	337	−4.5%
1930	316	−6.2%
1950	219	−30.7%
1961	183	−16.4%
1970	152	−16.9%
1980	123	−19.1%
1991	95	−22.8%
2001	89	−6.3%
2011	91	+2.2%
2021	123	+35.2%
Source: Censuses

== Sights ==
Újezdec is known for Růžový palouček ("Rose Meadow"). It is a memorable place with Monument to the Czech Brethren. According to legend, it is the place where the Czech Brethren said their last goodbyes to their homeland, before their departure abroad. The memorable place was created in 1906, the monument was raised in 1921, and the park around the place was founded in 1925.
