= Lhota pod Hořičkami =

- Municipality
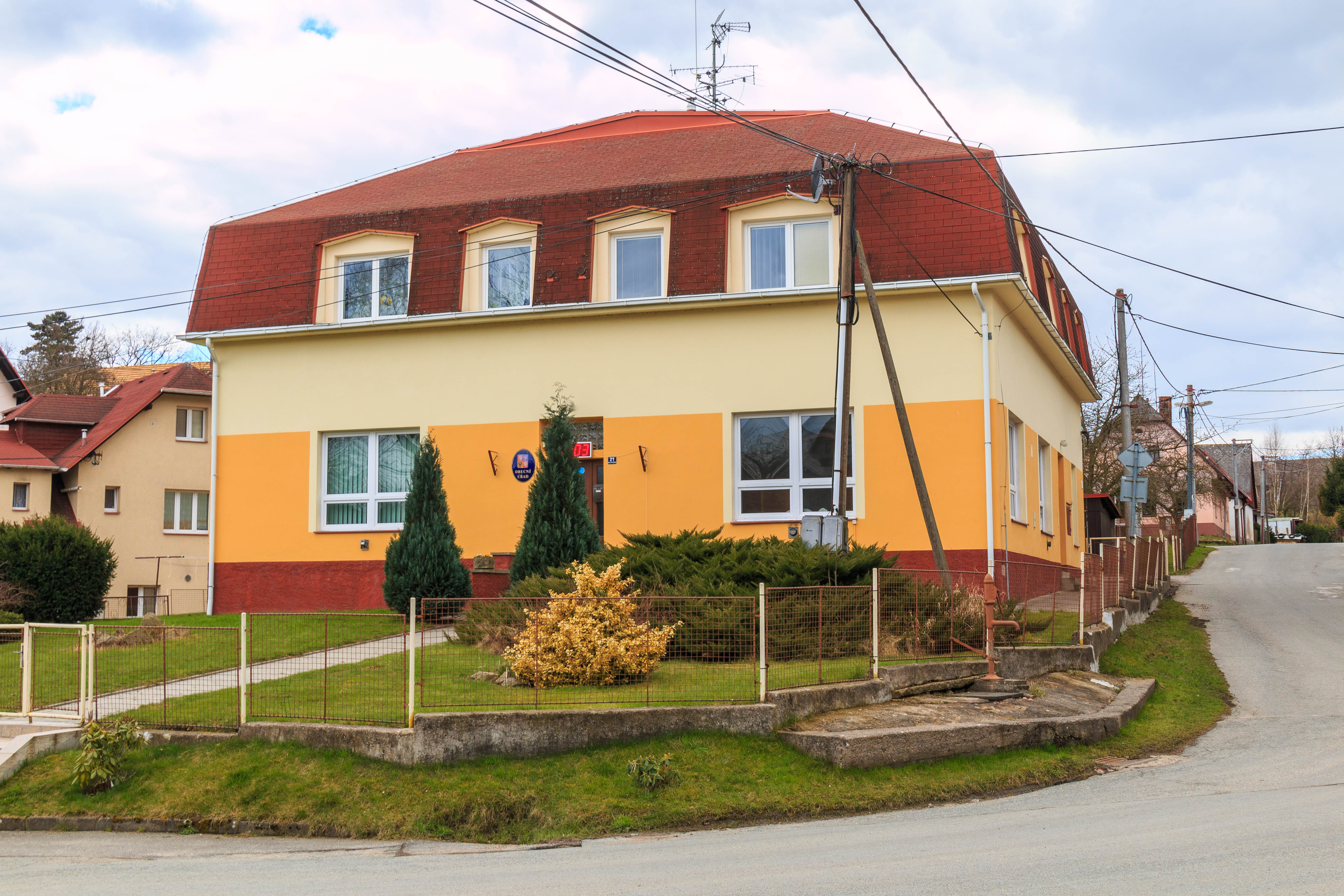
- Municipal office

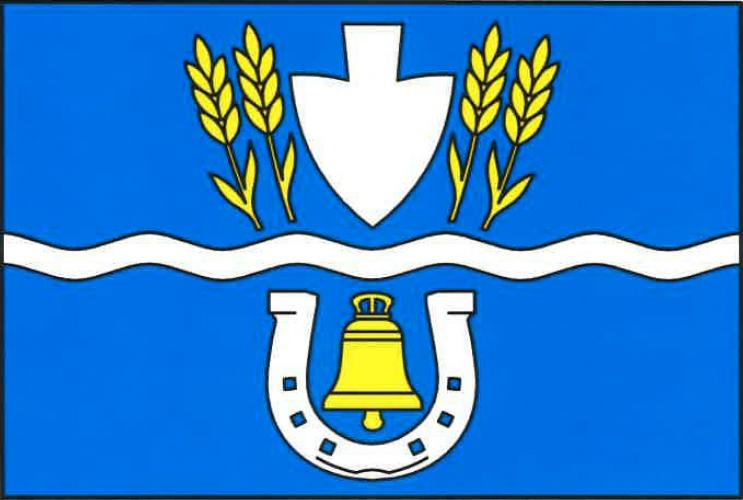
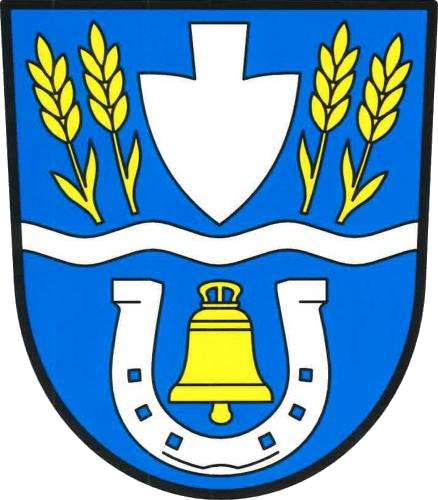
- Flag Coat of arms

- Location in the Czech Republic
- Coordinates: 50°25′22″N 16°0′11″E
- Country: Czech Republic
- Region: Hradec Králové
- District: Náchod
- First mentioned: 1405

Area
  - Total: 5.92 km^{2} (2.29 sq mi)
- Elevation: 319 m (1,047 ft)

Population (2026-01-01)
  - Total: 276
  - Density: 46.6/km^{2} (121/sq mi)
- Time zone: UTC+1 (CET)
  - Summer (DST): UTC+2 (CEST)
- Postal code: 552 05
- Website: www.lhotapodhorickami.cz

Lhota pod Hořičkami is a municipality and village in Náchod District in the Hradec Králové Region of the Czech Republic. It has about 300 inhabitants.

== Administrative division ==
Lhota pod Hořičkami consists of three municipal parts (in brackets population according to the 2021 census):

- Lhota pod Hořičkami (142)
- Světlá (63)
- Újezdec (63)

== Demographics ==
Historical population
Year	Pop.	±%
1869	978	—
1880	862	−11.9%
1890	763	−11.5%
1900	746	−2.2%
1910	711	−4.7%
1921	633	−11.0%
1930	588	−7.1%
1950	440	−25.2%
1961	363	−17.5%
1970	326	−10.2%
1980	275	−15.6%
1991	222	−19.3%
2001	246	+10.8%
2011	266	+8.1%
2021	268	+0.8%
Source: Censuses
