= Újezdec (Jindřichův Hradec District) =

Municipality in South Bohemian Region, Czech Republic

- Municipality
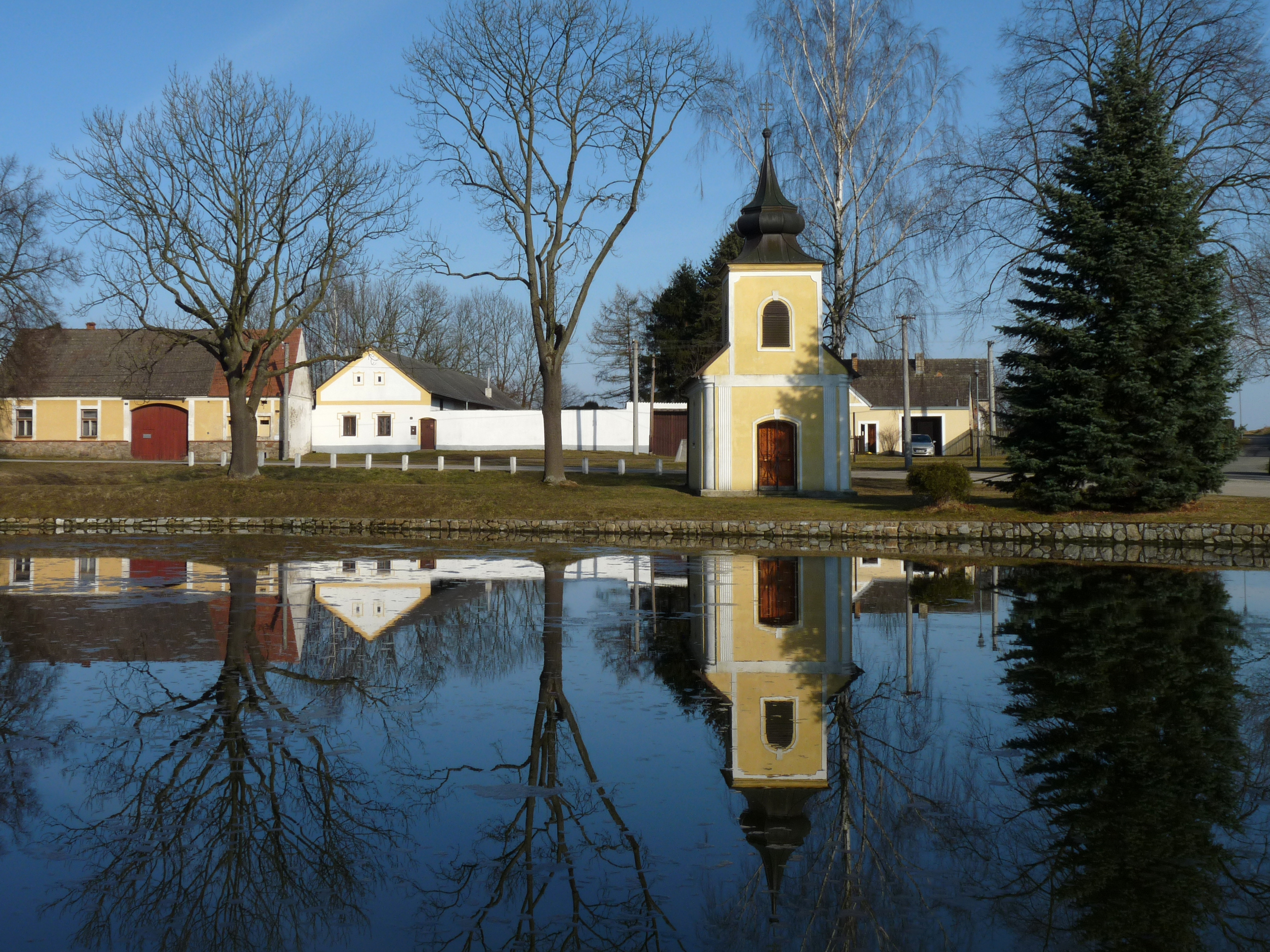
- Chapel of Saint Wenceslaus

- Location in the Czech Republic
- Coordinates: 49°12′27″N 14°47′5″E
- Country: Czech Republic
- Region: South Bohemian
- District: Jindřichův Hradec
- First mentioned: 1340

Area
  - Total: 4.22 km^{2} (1.63 sq mi)
- Elevation: 448 m (1,470 ft)

Population (2026-01-01)
  - Total: 72
  - Density: 17/km^{2} (44/sq mi)
- Time zone: UTC+1 (CET)
  - Summer (DST): UTC+2 (CEST)
- Postal code: 378 21
- Website: www.obecujezdec.com

Újezdec is a municipality and village in Jindřichův Hradec District in the South Bohemian Region of the Czech Republic. It has about 70 inhabitants.

Újezdec lies approximately 18 kilometres (11 mi) west of Jindřichův Hradec, 34 km (21 mi) north-east of České Budějovice, and 102 km (63 mi) south of Prague.

== Demographics ==
Historical population
Year	Pop.	±%
1869	182	—
1880	218	+19.8%
1890	221	+1.4%
1900	228	+3.2%
1910	199	−12.7%
1921	222	+11.6%
1930	210	−5.4%
1950	150	−28.6%
1961	154	+2.7%
1970	118	−23.4%
1980	91	−22.9%
1991	72	−20.9%
2001	61	−15.3%
2011	62	+1.6%
2021	65	+4.8%
Source: Censuses
