= Křížkový Újezdec =

- Municipality
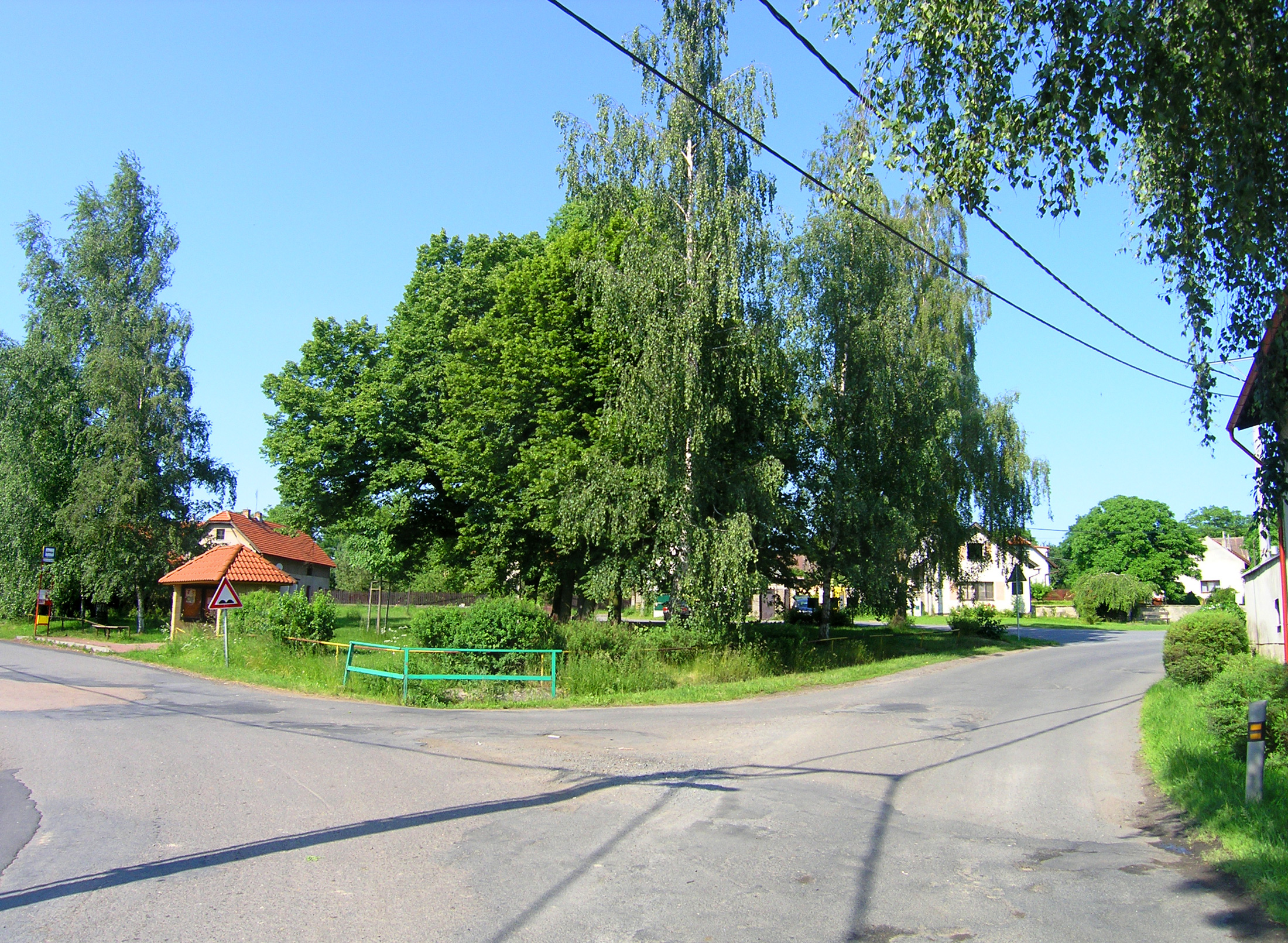
- Centre of Křížkový Újezdec

- Location in the Czech Republic
- Coordinates: 49°55′51″N 14°35′8″E
- Country: Czech Republic
- Region: Central Bohemian
- District: Prague-East
- First mentioned: 1349

Area
  - Total: 4.86 km^{2} (1.88 sq mi)
- Elevation: 449 m (1,473 ft)

Population (2026-01-01)
  - Total: 338
  - Density: 69.5/km^{2} (180/sq mi)
- Time zone: UTC+1 (CET)
  - Summer (DST): UTC+2 (CEST)
- Postal code: 251 68
- Website: www.krizkovyujezdec.eu

Křížkový Újezdec is a municipality and village in Prague-East District in the Central Bohemian Region of the Czech Republic. It has about 300 inhabitants.

== Administrative division ==
Křížkový Újezdec consists of two municipal parts (in brackets population according to the 2021 census):

- Křížkový Újezdec (200)
- Čenětice (75)

== History ==
The first written mention of Křížkový Újezdec is from 1349.

== Demographics ==
Historical population
Year	Pop.	±%
1869	337	—
1880	314	−6.8%
1890	361	+15.0%
1900	339	−6.1%
1910	331	−2.4%
1921	293	−11.5%
1930	282	−3.8%
1950	206	−27.0%
1961	178	−13.6%
1970	154	−13.5%
1980	141	−8.4%
1991	138	−2.1%
2001	137	−0.7%
2011	198	+44.5%
2021	275	+38.9%
Source: Censuses
