= Ptenín =

- Municipality
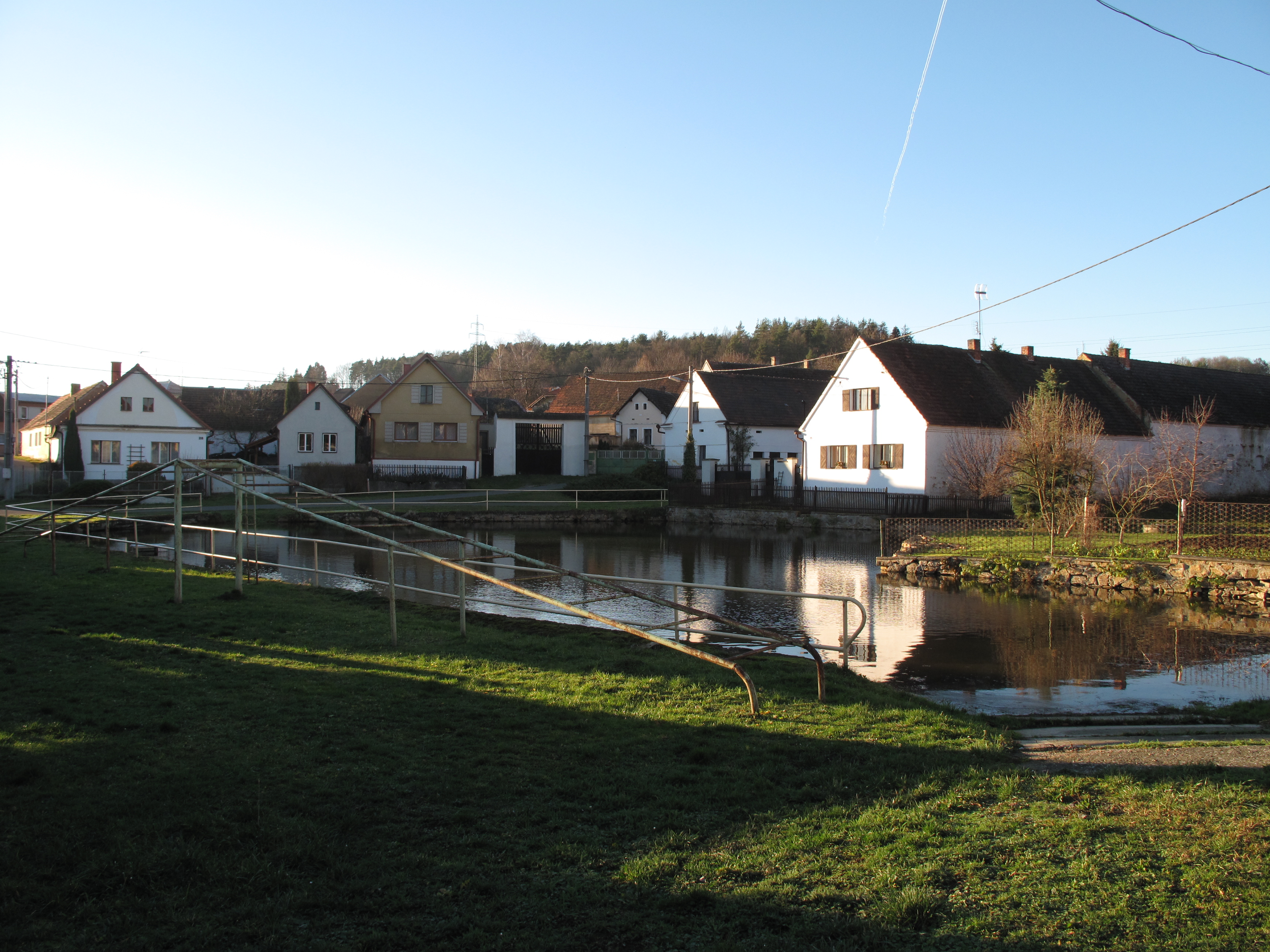
- Centre of Ptenín

- Location in the Czech Republic
- Coordinates: 49°31′54″N 13°11′6″E
- Country: Czech Republic
- Region: Plzeň
- District: Plzeň-South
- First mentioned: 1227

Area
  - Total: 8.14 km^{2} (3.14 sq mi)
- Elevation: 428 m (1,404 ft)

Population (2026-01-01)
  - Total: 200
  - Density: 25/km^{2} (64/sq mi)
- Time zone: UTC+1 (CET)
  - Summer (DST): UTC+2 (CEST)
- Postal code: 334 52
- Website: www.ptenin.cz

Ptenín is a municipality and village in Plzeň-South District in the Plzeň Region of the Czech Republic. It has about 200 inhabitants.

Ptenín lies approximately 29 kilometres (18 mi) south-west of Plzeň and 109 km (68 mi) south-west of Prague.

== Administrative division ==
Ptenín consists of two municipal parts (in brackets population according to the 2021 census):

- Ptenín (151)
- Újezdec (45)

== Demographics ==
Historical population
Year	Pop.	±%
1869	662	—
1880	654	−1.2%
1890	660	+0.9%
1900	674	+2.1%
1910	737	+9.3%
1921	755	+2.4%
1930	663	−12.2%
1950	414	−37.6%
1961	398	−3.9%
1970	336	−15.6%
1980	282	−16.1%
1991	234	−17.0%
2001	219	−6.4%
2011	206	−5.9%
2021	196	−4.9%
Source: Censuses

== Notable people ==
- Ferdinand Johann of Morzin (1756–1805), nobleman and infantry commander
