= Újezdec (Prachatice District) =

- Municipality
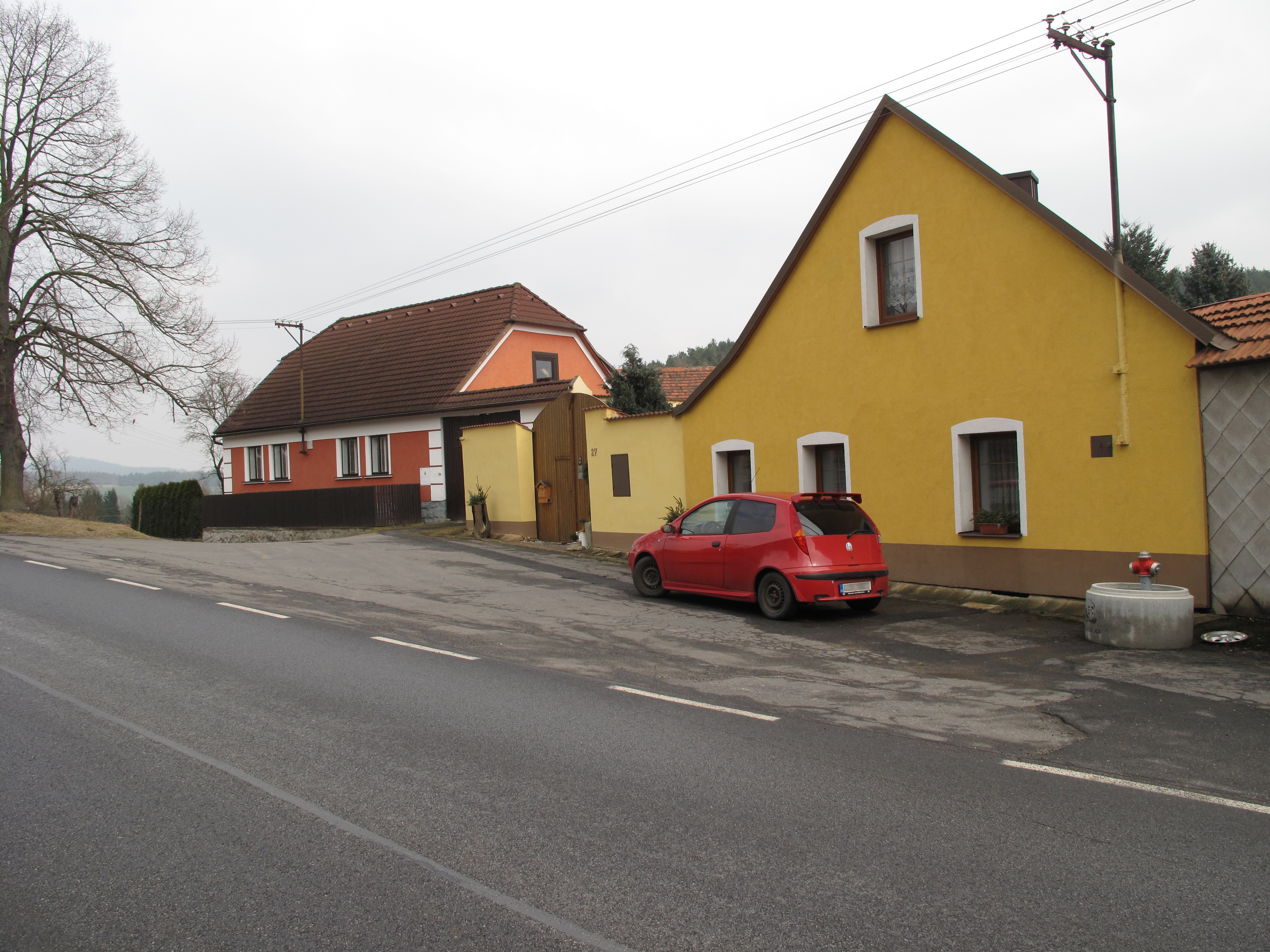
- Houses on the main street

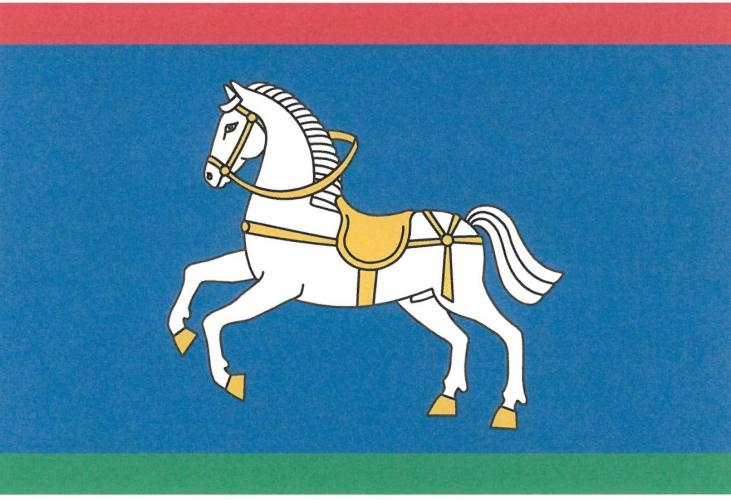
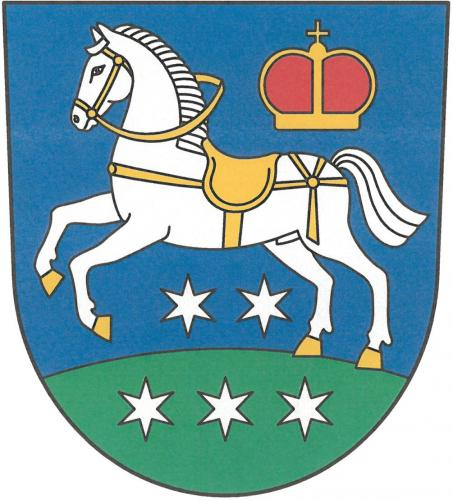
- Flag Coat of arms

- Location in the Czech Republic
- Coordinates: 49°6′29″N 13°57′50″E
- Country: Czech Republic
- Region: South Bohemian
- District: Prachatice
- First mentioned: 1300

Area
  - Total: 2.90 km^{2} (1.12 sq mi)
- Elevation: 532 m (1,745 ft)

Population (2026-01-01)
  - Total: 79
  - Density: 27/km^{2} (71/sq mi)
- Time zone: UTC+1 (CET)
  - Summer (DST): UTC+2 (CEST)
- Postal code: 384 22
- Website: www.ujezdecpt.cz

Újezdec is a municipality and village in Prachatice District in the South Bohemian Region of the Czech Republic. It has about 80 inhabitants.

Újezdec lies approximately 11 kilometres (7 mi) north of Prachatice, 41 km (25 mi) west of České Budějovice, and 115 km (71 mi) south of Prague.

== Demographics ==
Historical population
Year	Pop.	±%
1869	219	—
1880	246	+12.3%
1890	238	−3.3%
1900	222	−6.7%
1910	229	+3.2%
1921	237	+3.5%
1930	195	−17.7%
1950	159	−18.5%
1961	145	−8.8%
1970	117	−19.3%
1980	96	−17.9%
1991	66	−31.2%
2001	59	−10.6%
2011	79	+33.9%
2021	77	−2.5%
Source: Censuses
