= Syřenov =

- Municipality
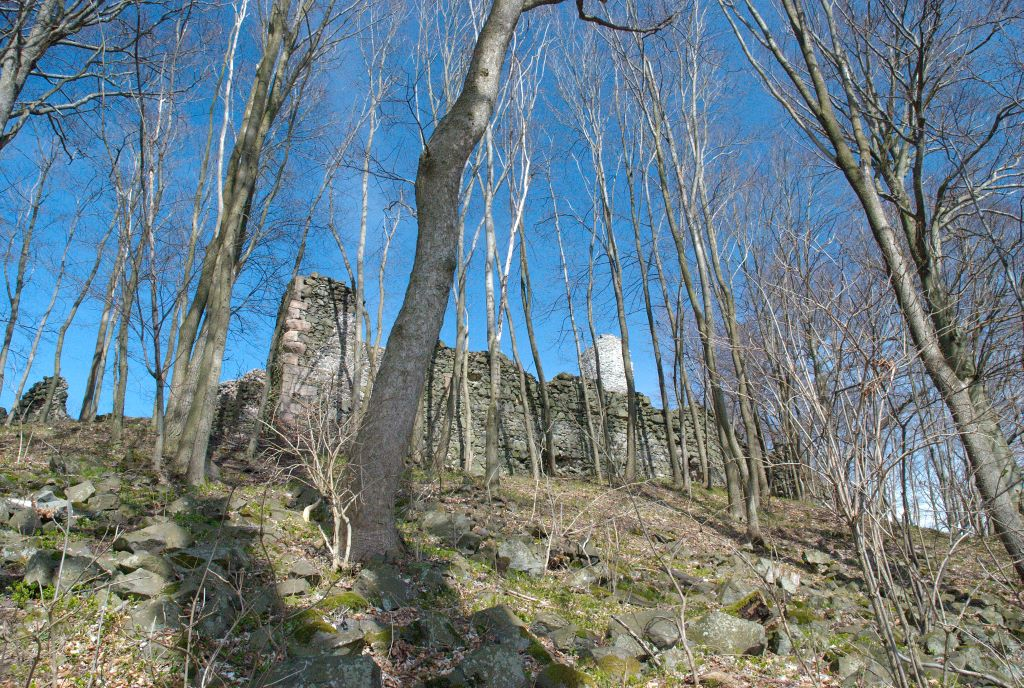
- Ruin of Kumburk Castle

- Flag Coat of arms

- Location in the Czech Republic
- Coordinates: 50°29′56″N 15°25′40″E
- Country: Czech Republic
- Region: Liberec
- District: Semily
- First mentioned: 1533

Area
  - Total: 6.46 km^{2} (2.49 sq mi)
- Elevation: 448 m (1,470 ft)

Population (2026-01-01)
  - Total: 245
  - Density: 37.9/km^{2} (98.2/sq mi)
- Time zone: UTC+1 (CET)
  - Summer (DST): UTC+2 (CEST)
- Postal code: 512 71
- Website: syrenov.cz

Syřenov is a municipality and village in Semily District in the Liberec Region of the Czech Republic. It has about 200 inhabitants.

== Administrative division ==
Syřenov consists of three municipal parts (in brackets population according to the 2021 census):

- Syřenov (136)
- Újezdec (11)
- Žďár u Kumburku (81)

== Demographics ==
Historical population
Year	Pop.	±%
1869	663	—
1880	638	−3.8%
1890	632	−0.9%
1900	588	−7.0%
1910	564	−4.1%
1921	514	−8.9%
1930	489	−4.9%
1950	391	−20.0%
1961	328	−16.1%
1970	293	−10.7%
1980	251	−14.3%
1991	195	−22.3%
2001	204	+4.6%
2011	207	+1.5%
2021	228	+10.1%
Source: Censuses
