= Nemanice =

- Municipality
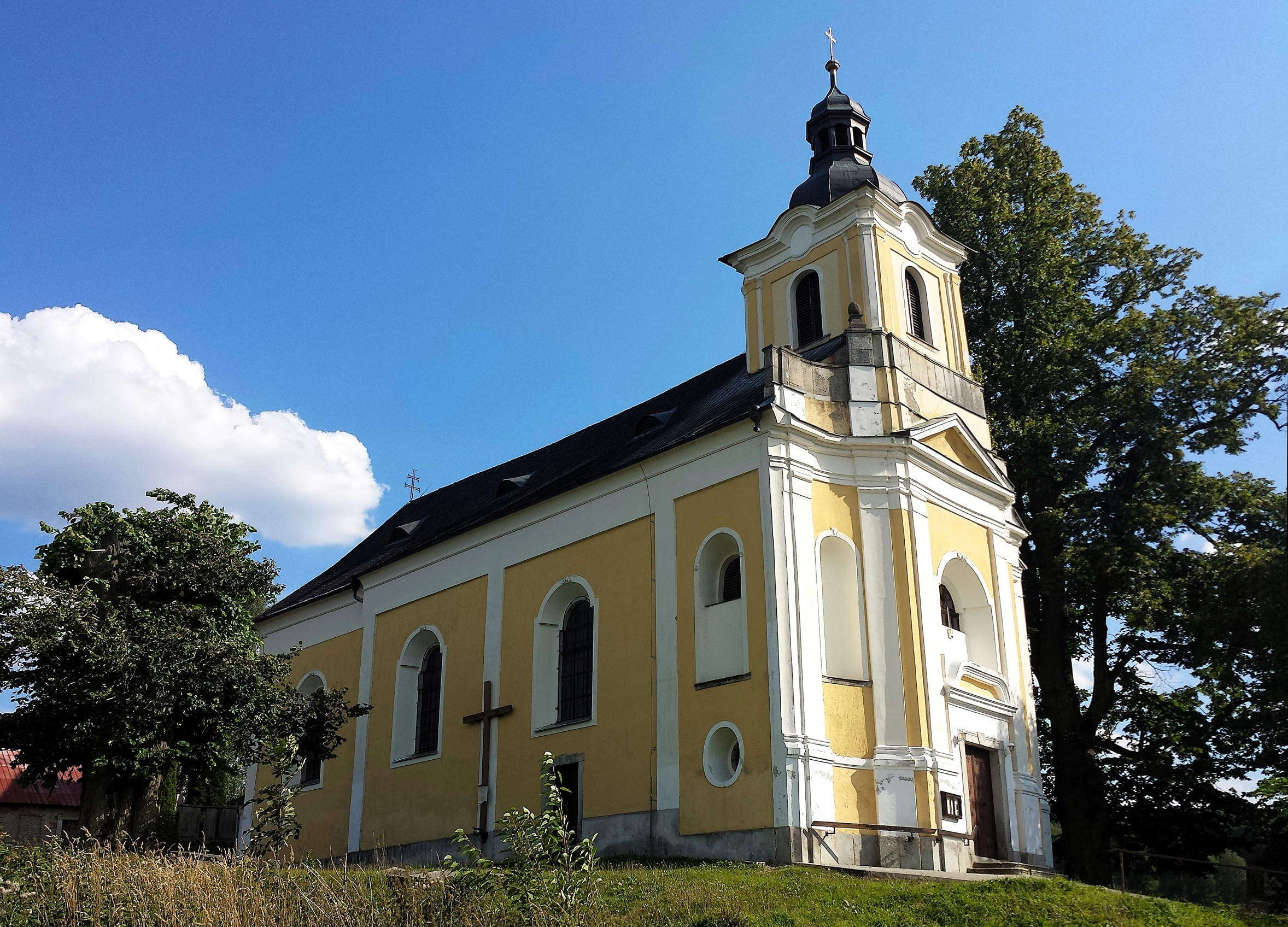
- Church of Saint John of Nepomuk

- Flag Coat of arms

- Location in the Czech Republic
- Coordinates: 49°26′12″N 12°43′14″E
- Country: Czech Republic
- Region: Plzeň
- District: Domažlice
- First mentioned: 1591

Area
  - Total: 38.38 km^{2} (14.82 sq mi)
- Elevation: 530 m (1,740 ft)

Population (2026-01-01)
  - Total: 287
  - Density: 7.48/km^{2} (19.4/sq mi)
- Time zone: UTC+1 (CET)
  - Summer (DST): UTC+2 (CEST)
- Postal code: 345 36
- Website: www.obec-nemanice.cz

Nemanice (German: Wassersuppen) is a municipality and village in Domažlice District in the Plzeň Region of the Czech Republic. It has about 300 inhabitants.

Nemanice lies approximately 15 kilometres (9 mi) west of Domažlice, 59 km (37 mi) south-west of Plzeň, and 142 km (88 mi) south-west of Prague.

== Administrative division ==
Nemanice consists of seven municipal parts (in brackets population according to the 2021 census):

- Nemanice (151)
- Lísková (25)
- Nemaničky (5)
- Nová Huť (22)
- Novosedelské Hutě (26)
- Novosedly (0)
- Stará Huť (6)

== History ==
The first written mention of Nemanice is from 1591. The village was founded by the town of Domažlice shortly before this year.

== Demographics ==
Historical population
Year	Pop.	±%
1869	3,826	—
1880	3,889	+1.6%
1890	3,863	−0.7%
1900	3,668	−5.0%
1910	3,771	+2.8%
1921	3,447	−8.6%
1930	3,057	−11.3%
1950	364	−88.1%
1961	344	−5.5%
1970	398	+15.7%
1980	386	−3.0%
1991	344	−10.9%
2001	330	−4.1%
2011	245	−25.8%
2021	235	−4.1%
Source: Censuses
