= Luštěnice =

- Municipality
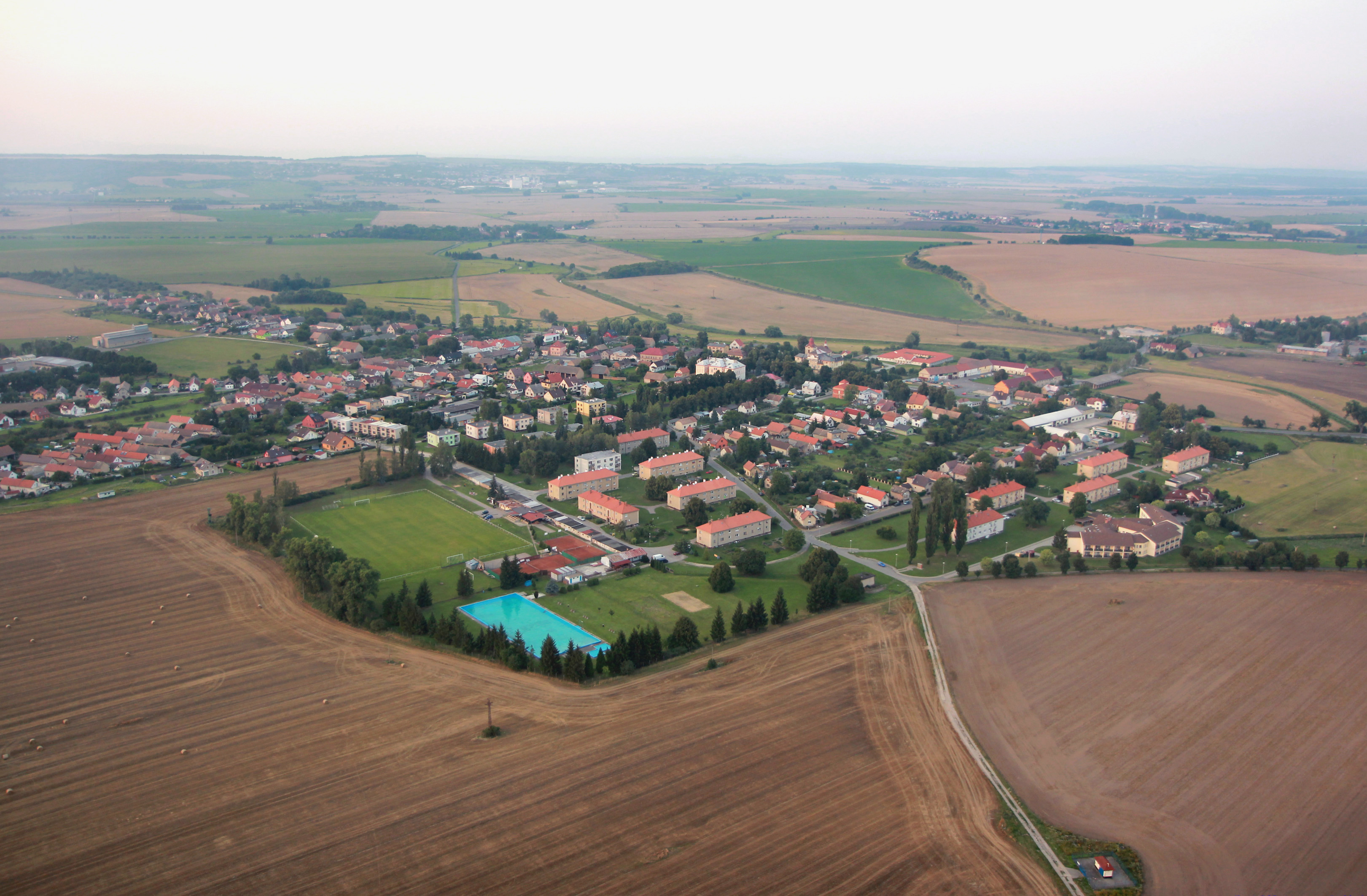
- Aerial view

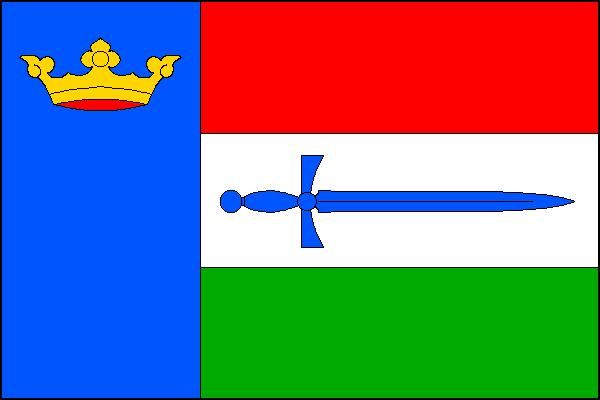
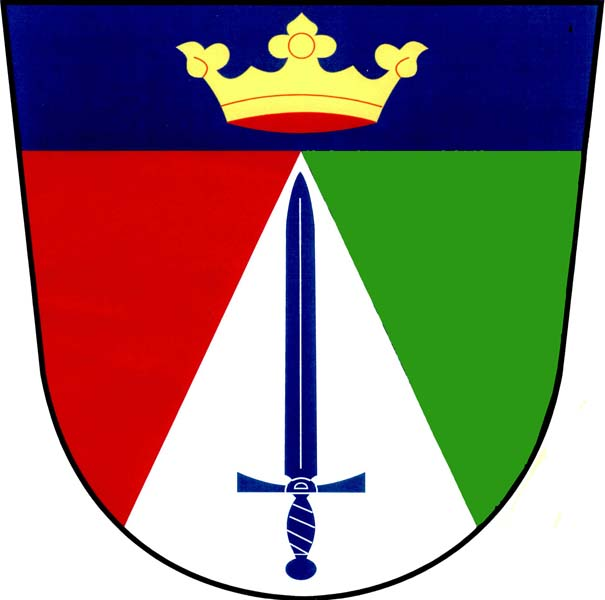
- Flag Coat of arms

- Location in the Czech Republic
- Coordinates: 50°19′23″N 14°56′12″E
- Country: Czech Republic
- Region: Central Bohemian
- District: Mladá Boleslav
- First mentioned: 1268

Area
  - Total: 14.78 km^{2} (5.71 sq mi)
- Elevation: 209 m (686 ft)

Population (2026-01-01)
  - Total: 2,369
  - Density: 160.3/km^{2} (415.1/sq mi)
- Time zone: UTC+1 (CET)
  - Summer (DST): UTC+2 (CEST)
- Postal code: 294 42
- Website: www.lustenice.cz

Luštěnice is a municipality and village in Mladá Boleslav District in the Central Bohemian Region of the Czech Republic. It has about 2,400 inhabitants.

== Administrative division ==
Luštěnice consists of three municipal parts (in brackets population according to the 2021 census):

- Luštěnice (1,001)
- Voděrady (111)
- Zelená (1,161)

== Etymology ==
The initial name of the village was Luščinice, meaning "the village of Luščina's people". The name was then distorted to Luščenice and from the early 15th century, it is called Luštěnice.

== Geography ==
Luštěnice is located about 10 kilometres (6 mi) south of Mladá Boleslav and 38 km (24 mi) northeast of Prague. It lies in the Jizera Table. The highest point is at 241 m (791 ft) above sea level. The Vlkava River flows through the municipality.

== History ==
The first written mention of Luštěnice is from 1268. From 1570 to 1739, the village was part of the Kosmonosy estate, owned were the Czernin family. In 1739, Luštěnice was purchased by Josef Scherzer of Kleinmühl. He had built the Luštěnice Castle around 1740. The Gallas family owned the village from 1774 to 1805, then they sold it to the Nostitz family.

== Demographics ==
Historical population

Year	Pop.	±%
1869	814	—
1880	985	+21.0%
1890	1,061	+7.7%
1900	1,190	+12.2%
1910	1,230	+3.4%

Year	Pop.	±%
1921	1,242	+1.0%
1930	1,248	+0.5%
1950	1,180	−5.4%
1961	1,274	+8.0%
1970	1,116	−12.4%

Year	Pop.	±%
1980	858	−23.1%
1991	818	−4.7%
2001	1,380	+68.7%
2011	2,194	+59.0%
2021	2,273	+3.6%

Source: Censuses

== Transport ==
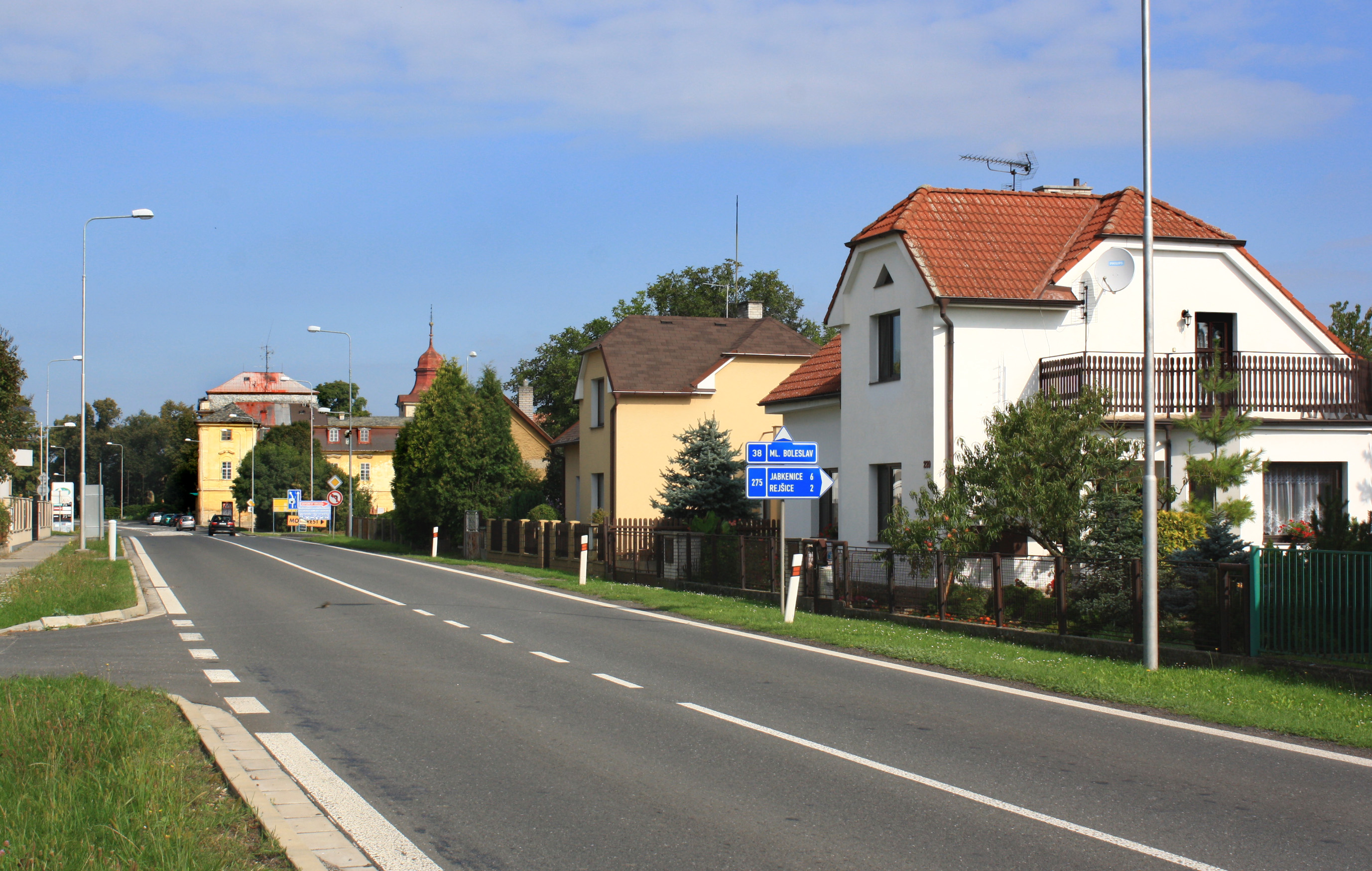
Main road

The I/38 road (the section Mladá Boleslav–Nymburk) runs through the municipality.

Luštěnice is located on the railway line Mladá Boleslav–Nymburk.

== Sights ==
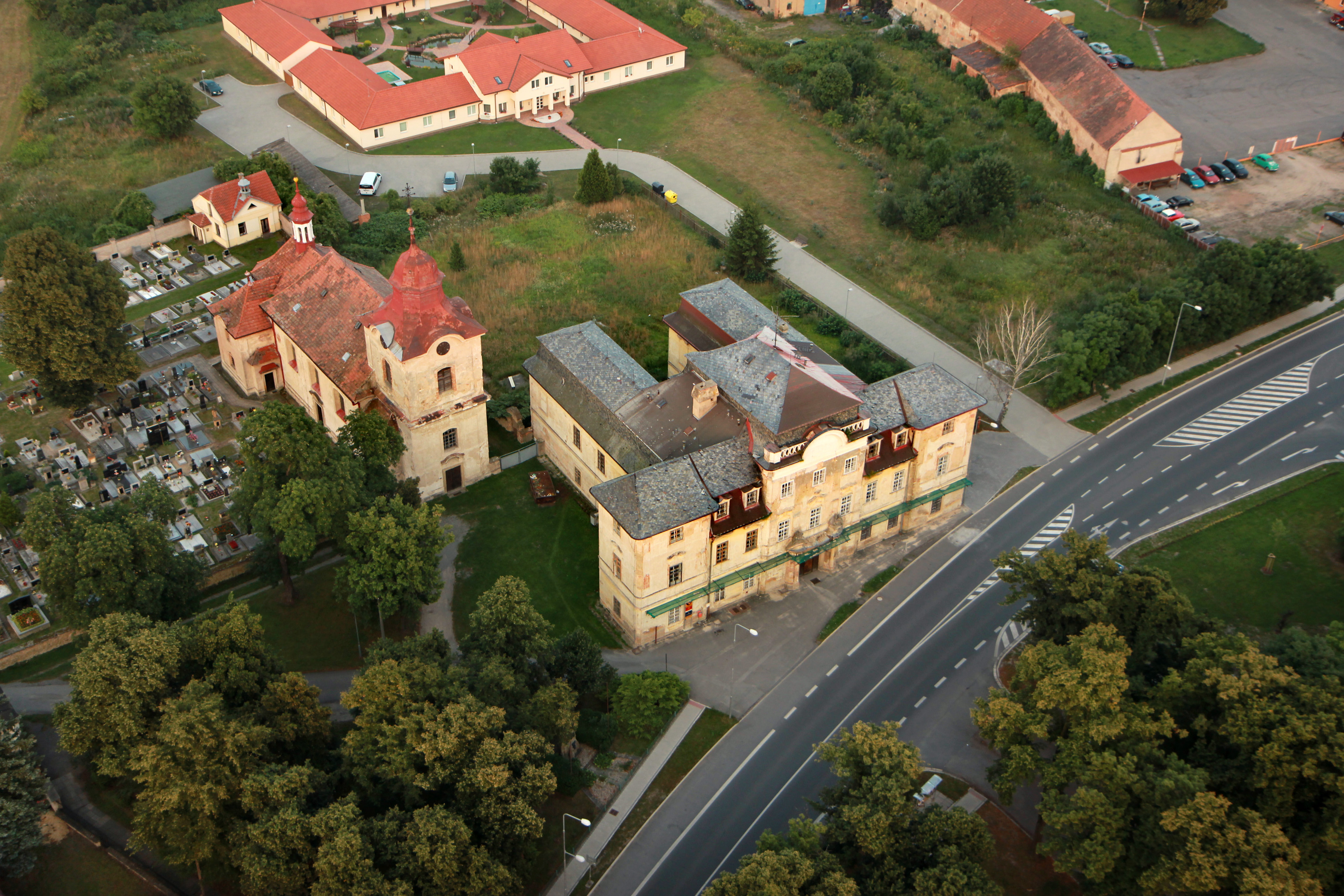
Church of Saint Martin and the castle

The main landmark of Luštěnice is the Church of Saint Martin. It is a Baroque church from 1739 that replaced the old parish church.

The Luštěnice Castle is a late Baroque building from the 18th century, built on the site of an old fortress. From 1805, the castle was used as an administrative building and fell into disrepair. Today it is unused, but it is gradually being repaired.
