= Petrovice I =

- Municipality
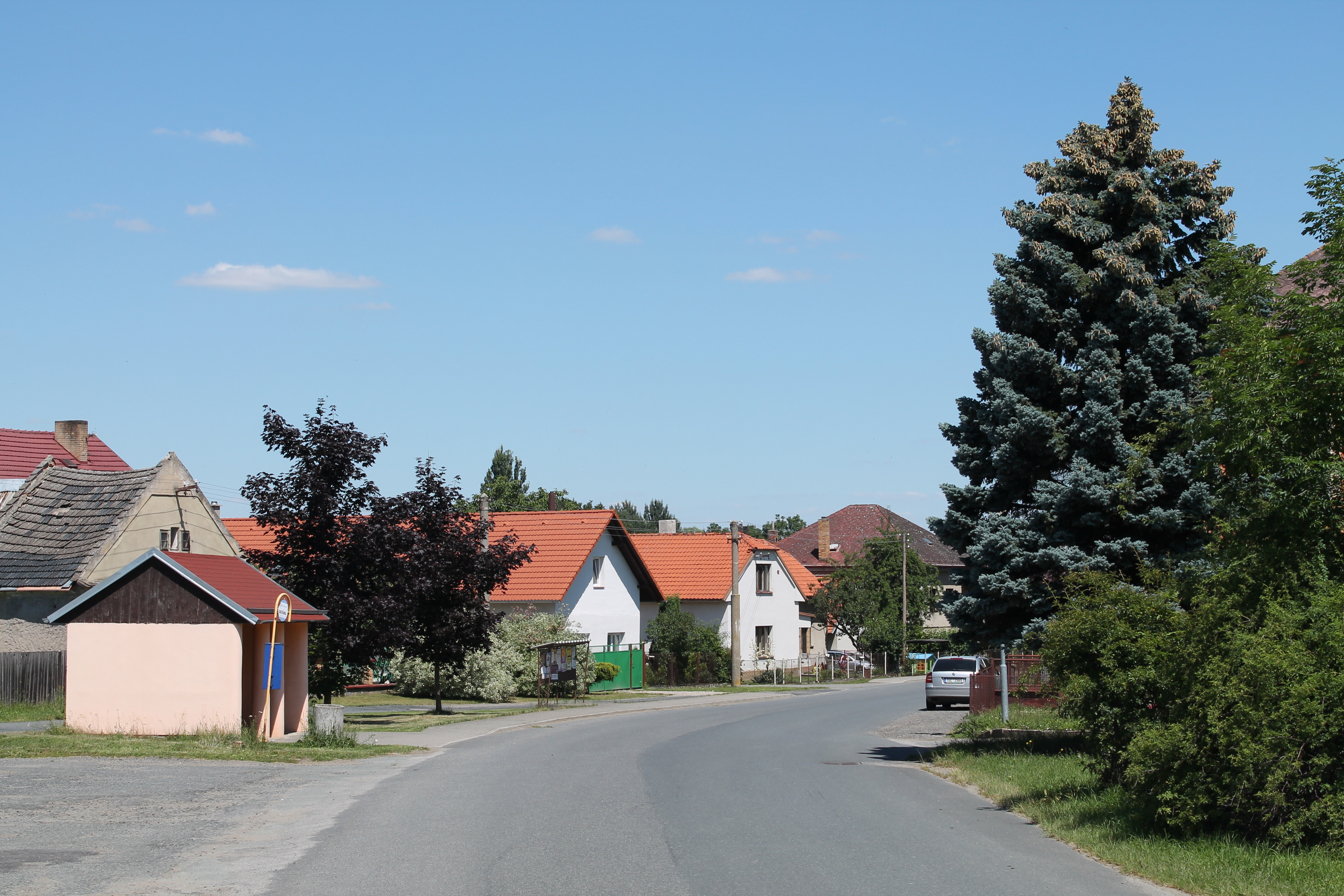
- Centre of Petrovice I

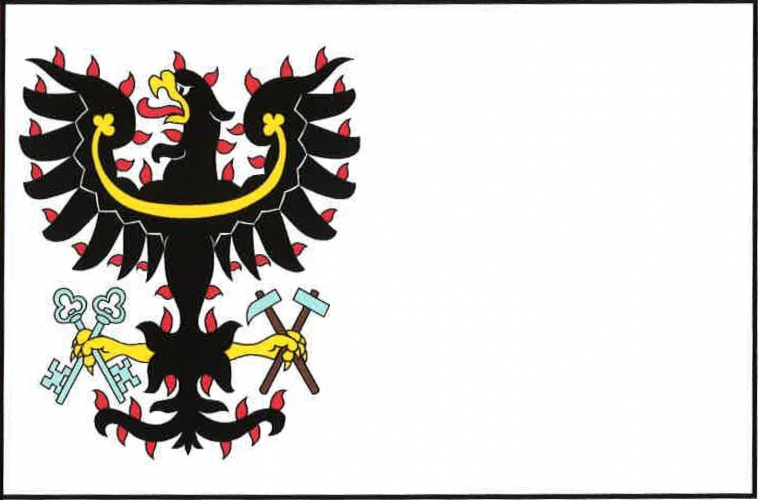
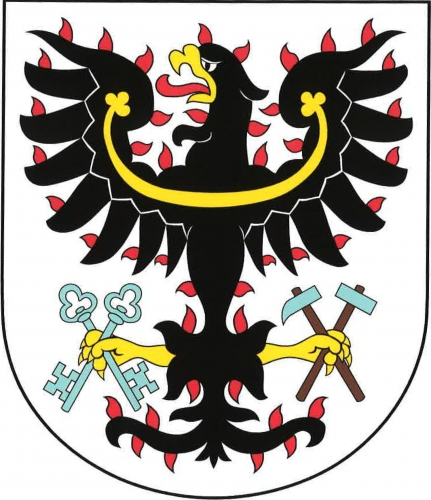
- Flag Coat of arms

- Location in the Czech Republic
- Coordinates: 49°48′40″N 15°17′50″E
- Country: Czech Republic
- Region: Central Bohemian
- District: Kutná Hora
- First mentioned: 1352

Area
  - Total: 14.90 km^{2} (5.75 sq mi)
- Elevation: 438 m (1,437 ft)

Population (2026-01-01)
  - Total: 307
  - Density: 20.6/km^{2} (53.4/sq mi)
- Time zone: UTC+1 (CET)
  - Summer (DST): UTC+2 (CEST)
- Postal code: 286 01
- Website: www.petrovice1.cz

Petrovice I is a municipality and village in Kutná Hora District in the Central Bohemian Region of the Czech Republic. It has about 300 inhabitants.

== Administrative division ==
Petrovice I consists of five municipal parts (in brackets population according to the 2021 census):

- Petrovice I (201)
- Hološiny (12)
- Michalovice (8)
- Senetín (23)
- Újezdec (49)

== Etymology ==
The name Petrovice is derived from the personal name Petr, meaning "the village of Petr's people". The Roman numeral in the name serves to distinguish it from the nearby municipality of the same name, Petrovice II.

== Geography ==
Petrovice I is located about 15 kilometres (9 mi) south of Kutná Hora and 61 km (38 mi) southeast of Prague. It lies in the Upper Sázava Hills. The highest point is at 558 m (1,831 ft) above sea level. Several small streams flow through the municipality. The municipal territory is rich in fishponds, the largest of which is Zbožňov.

== History ==
The first written mention of Petrovice I is from 1352. Among the noble families that owned the village were the Haugvic of Biskupice family and the Hrobnický of Hrobnice family. From 1724, Petrovice I was owned by the town of Kutná Hora and was annexed to the Červené Janovice estate.

== Demographics ==
Historical population

Year	Pop.	±%
1869	953	—
1880	942	−1.2%
1890	970	+3.0%
1900	882	−9.1%
1910	857	−2.8%

Year	Pop.	±%
1921	745	−13.1%
1930	793	+6.4%
1950	495	−37.6%
1961	477	−3.6%
1970	409	−14.3%

Year	Pop.	±%
1980	391	−4.4%
1991	318	−18.7%
2001	306	−3.8%
2011	309	+1.0%
2021	293	−5.2%

Source: Censuses

== Transport ==
There are no railways or major roads passing through the municipality.

== Sights ==
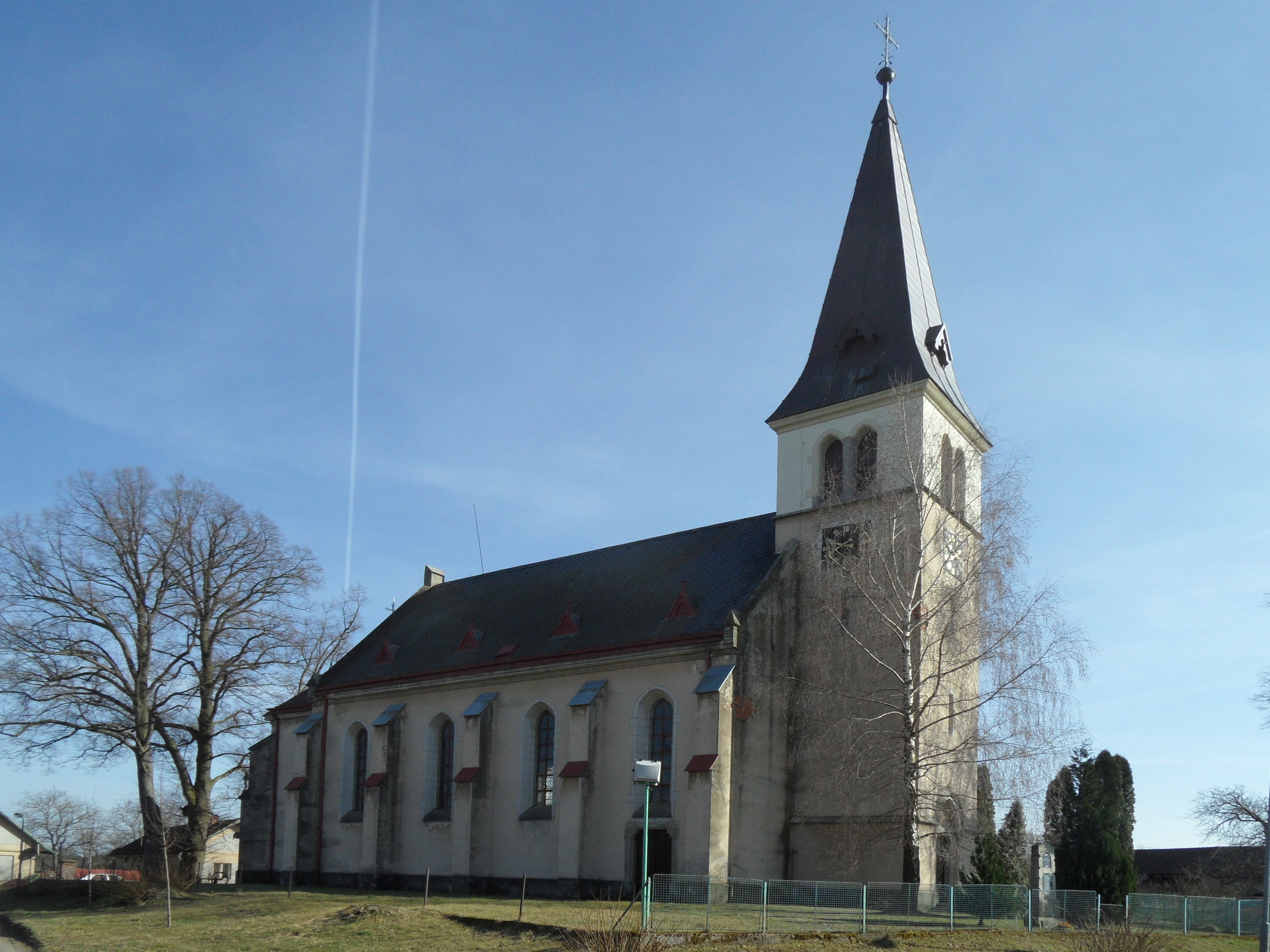
Church of Saint Wenceslaus

The main landmark of Petrovice I is the Church of Saint Wenceslaus. It was built in the neo-Gothic style in 1891–1892. It replaced an old medieval church.

The most valuable building in the municipality is the Church of Saint Matthew in Michalovice. It is an early Gothic building from the mid-13th century, modified in the Baroque style during the reconstructions in the 17th and 18th centuries. Next to the church is a separate wooden bell tower.
