= Mochtín =

- Municipality
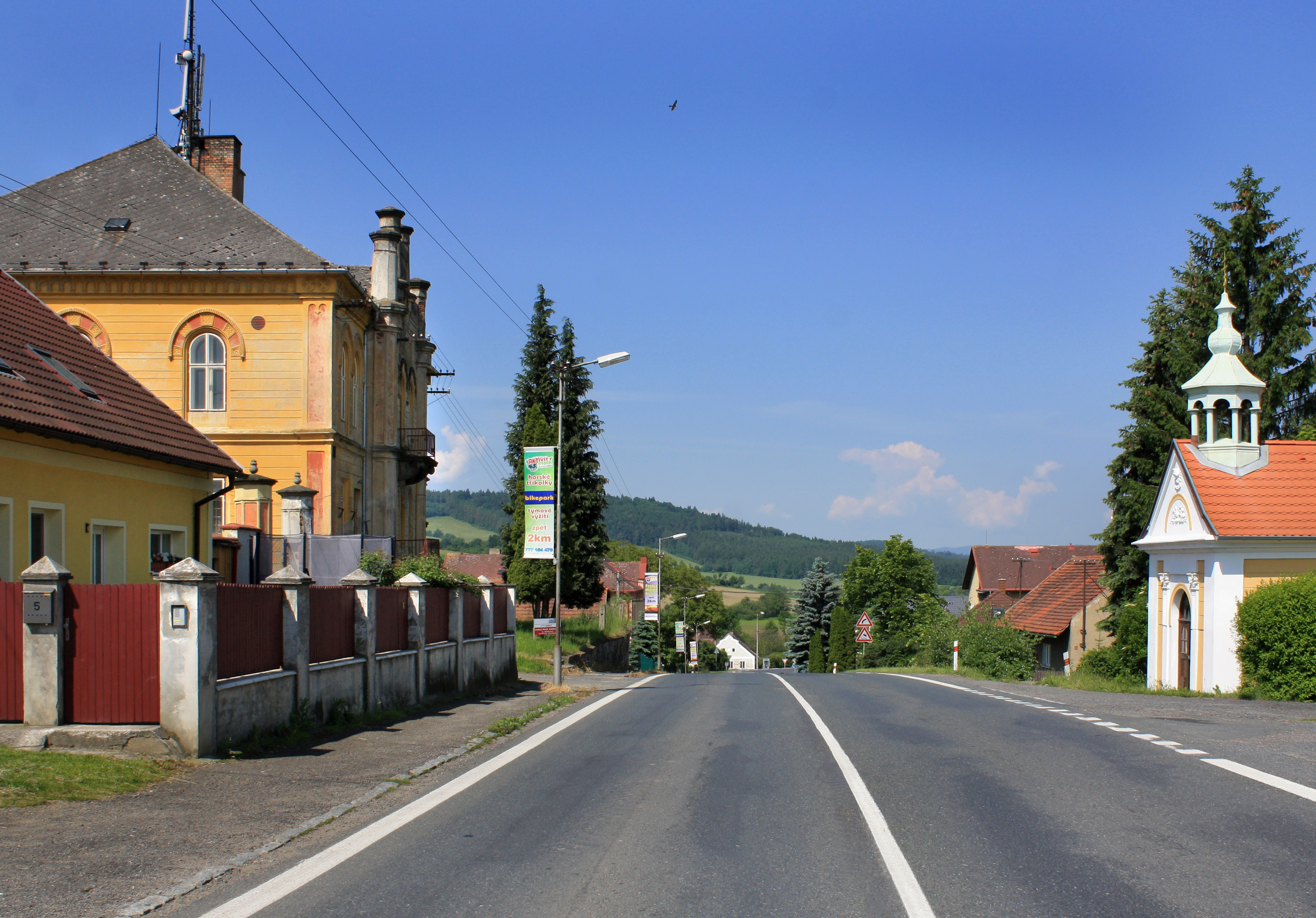
- Main road

- Location in the Czech Republic
- Coordinates: 49°21′38″N 13°21′25″E
- Country: Czech Republic
- Region: Plzeň
- District: Klatovy
- First mentioned: 1398

Area
  - Total: 23.97 km^{2} (9.25 sq mi)
- Elevation: 450 m (1,480 ft)

Population (2026-01-01)
  - Total: 1,160
  - Density: 48.4/km^{2} (125/sq mi)
- Time zone: UTC+1 (CET)
  - Summer (DST): UTC+2 (CEST)
- Postal code: 339 01
- Website: www.mochtin.cz

Mochtín is a municipality and village in Klatovy District in the Plzeň Region of the Czech Republic. It has about 1,200 inhabitants.

== Administrative division ==
Mochtín consists of ten municipal parts (in brackets population according to the 2021 census):

- Mochtín (510)
- Bystré (40)
- Hoštice (60)
- Hoštičky (84)
- Kocourov (77)
- Lhůta (31)
- Nový Čestín (24)
- Srbice (144)
- Těšetiny (79)
- Újezdec (91)

== Etymology ==
The initial name of the settlement was Mochotín. The name was derived from the personal name Mochota, meaning "Mochota's (court)".

== Geography ==
Mochtín is located about 5 kilometres (3 mi) southeast of Klatovy and 41 km (25 mi) south of Plzeň. It lies on the border between the Švihov Highlands and Blatná Uplands. The stream Mochtínský potok flows through the municipality, and several of its tributaries flow into it in the municipal territory.

== History ==
The first written mention of Mochtín is from 1398.

== Demographics ==
Historical population

Year	Pop.	±%
1869	1,933	—
1880	2,037	+5.4%
1890	1,776	−12.8%
1900	1,725	−2.9%
1910	1,780	+3.2%

Year	Pop.	±%
1921	1,760	−1.1%
1930	1,726	−1.9%
1950	1,054	−38.9%
1961	1,172	+11.2%
1970	1,119	−4.5%

Year	Pop.	±%
1980	1,059	−5.4%
1991	967	−8.7%
2001	919	−5.0%
2011	962	+4.7%
2021	1,140	+18.5%

Source: Censuses

== Transport ==
The I/22 road (the section from Klatovy to Strakonice) runs through the municipality.

== Sights ==
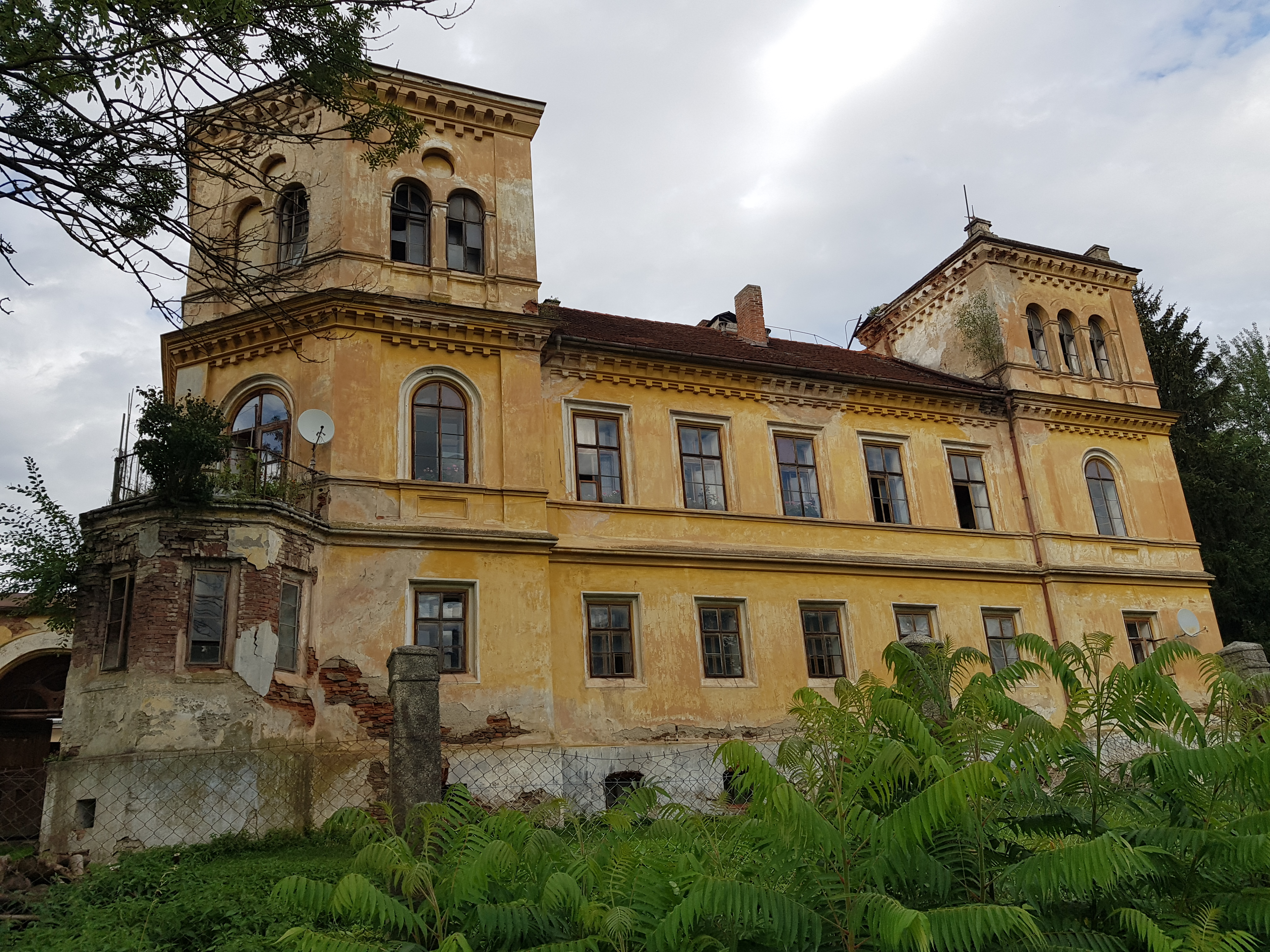
Nový Čestín Castle

The most important monument in the municipality is the Nový Čestín Castle, located in Nový Čestín. It was built in the Baroque style in 1783. In the second half of the 19th century, it was rebuilt in the Romantic (Neo-Renaissance) style, inspired by the Italian Renaissance. Today it is privately owned and is partly converted into apartments.
