= Hřebečníky =

- Municipality
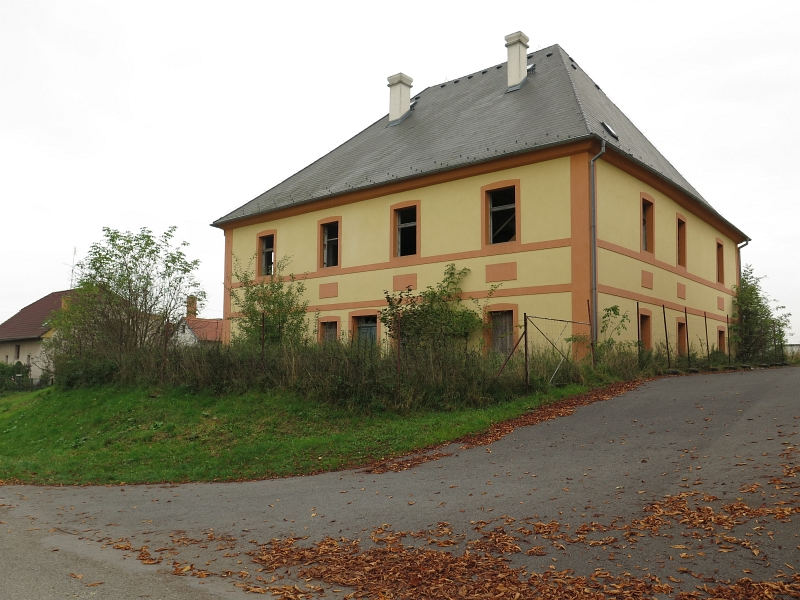
- Manor house

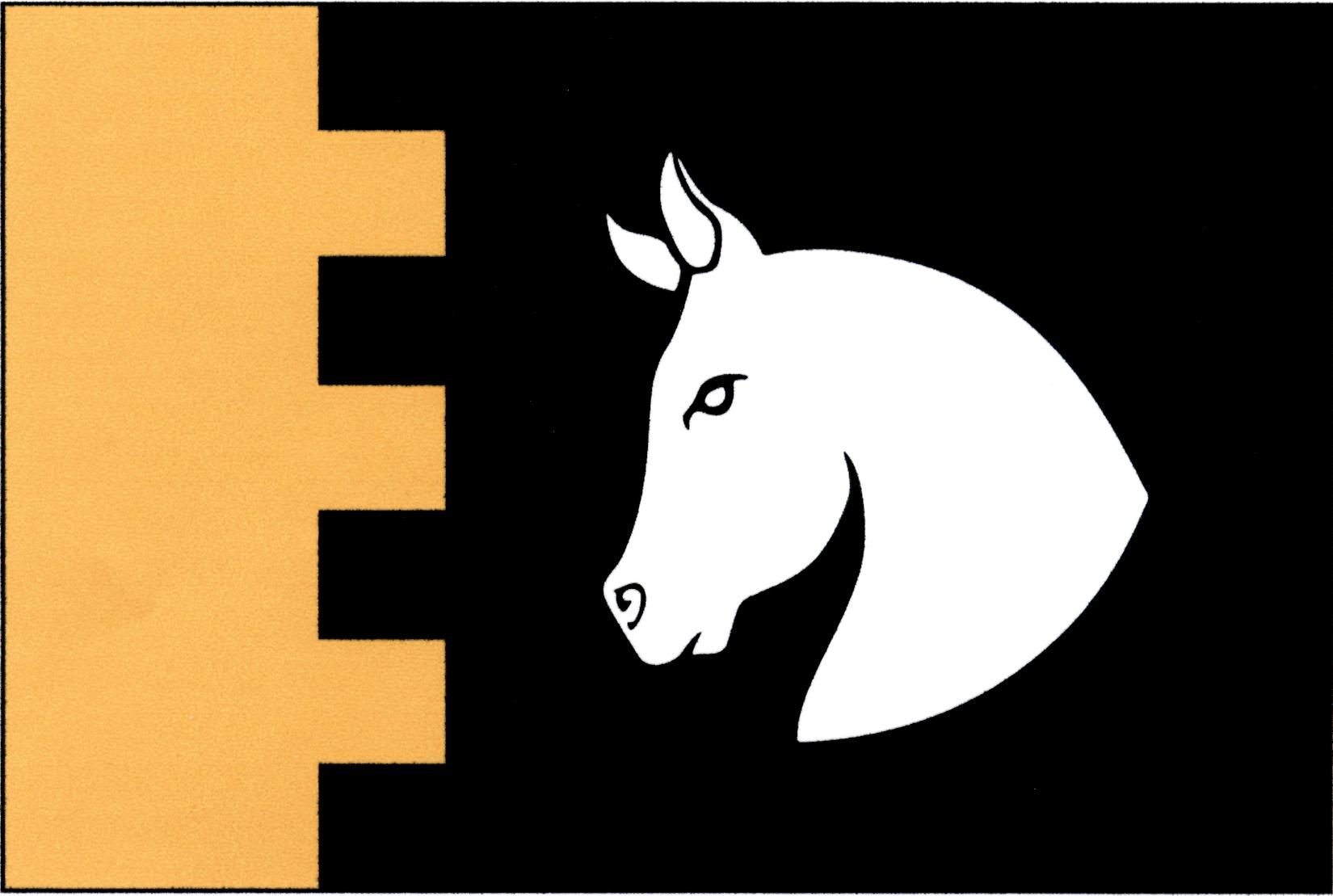
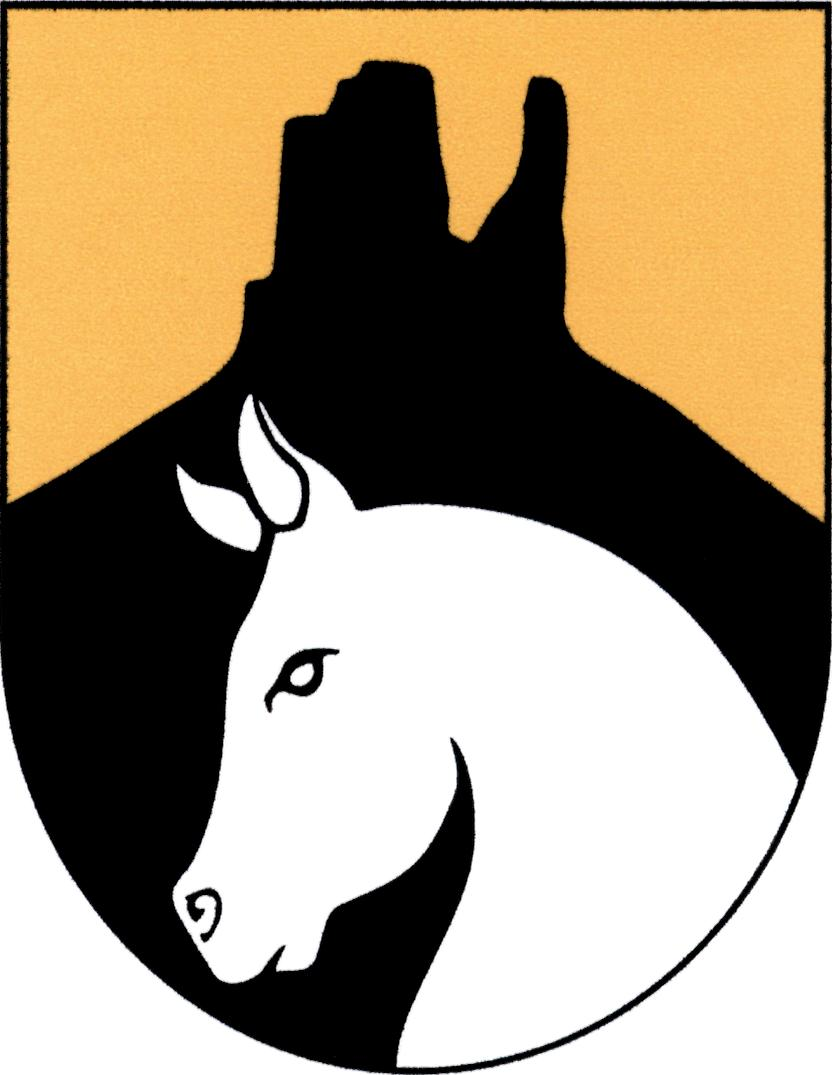
- Flag Coat of arms

- Location in the Czech Republic
- Coordinates: 49°59′5″N 13°45′12″E
- Country: Czech Republic
- Region: Central Bohemian
- District: Rakovník
- First mentioned: 1399

Area
  - Total: 18.42 km^{2} (7.11 sq mi)
- Elevation: 388 m (1,273 ft)

Population (2026-01-01)
  - Total: 244
  - Density: 13.2/km^{2} (34.3/sq mi)
- Time zone: UTC+1 (CET)
  - Summer (DST): UTC+2 (CEST)
- Postal code: 270 41
- Website: www.obec-hrebecniky.cz

Hřebečníky is a municipality and village in Rakovník District in the Central Bohemian Region of the Czech Republic. It has about 200 inhabitants.

== Administrative division ==
Hřebečníky consists of five municipal parts (in brackets population according to the 2021 census):

- Hřebečníky (117)
- Novosedly (29)
- Šlovice (26)
- Týřovice (48)
- Újezdec (28)

== Demographics ==
Historical population
Year	Pop.	±%
1869	1,147	—
1880	1,064	−7.2%
1890	1,095	+2.9%
1900	1,056	−3.6%
1910	1,011	−4.3%
1921	916	−9.4%
1930	810	−11.6%
1950	506	−37.5%
1961	455	−10.1%
1970	365	−19.8%
1980	303	−17.0%
1991	295	−2.6%
2001	276	−6.4%
2011	234	−15.2%
2021	248	+6.0%
Source: Censuses
