= Horní Kruty =

- Municipality
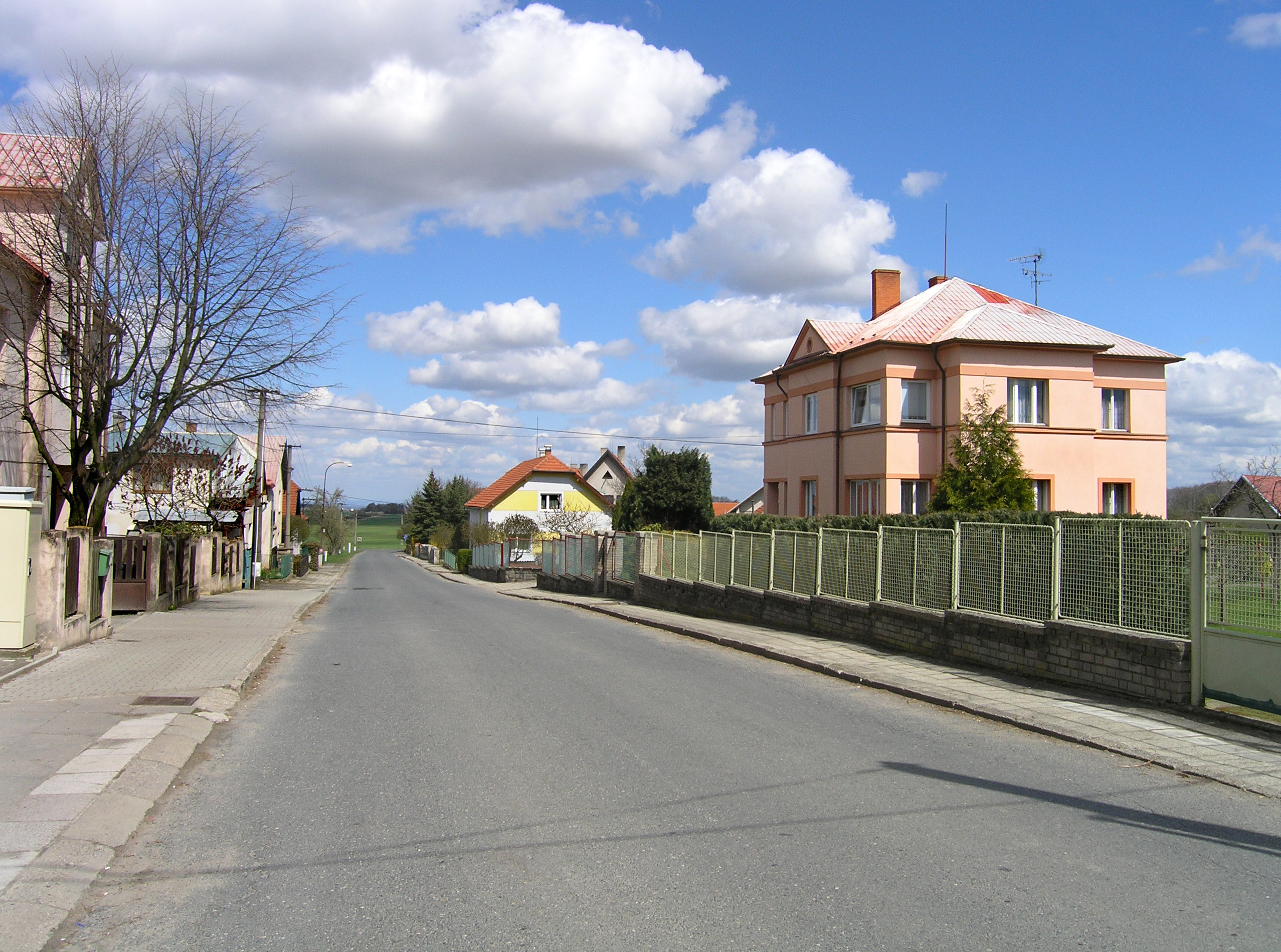
- Main road

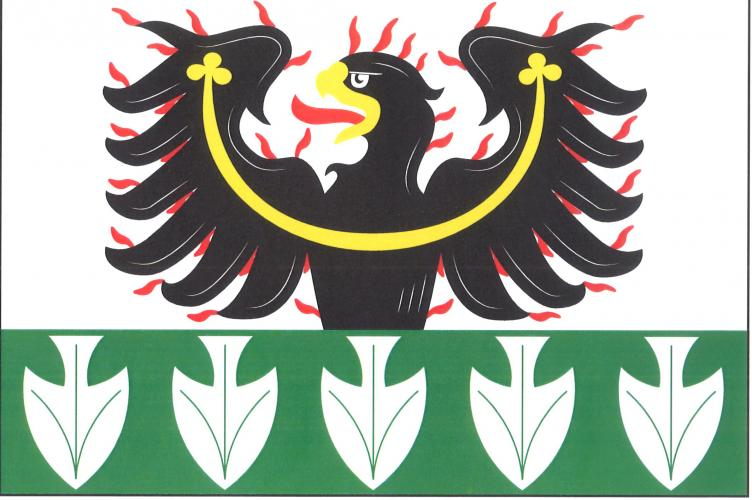
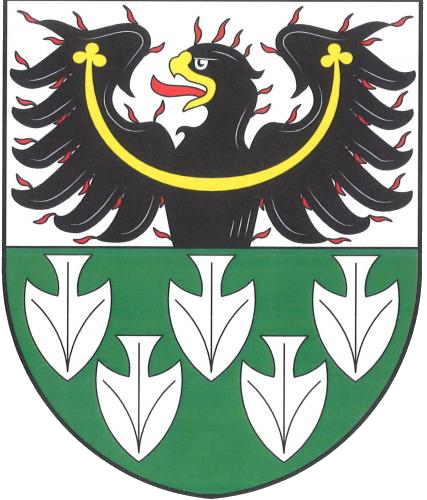
- Flag Coat of arms

- Location in the Czech Republic
- Coordinates: 49°55′10″N 14°57′35″E
- Country: Czech Republic
- Region: Central Bohemian
- District: Kolín
- First mentioned: 1228

Area
  - Total: 14.34 km^{2} (5.54 sq mi)
- Elevation: 408 m (1,339 ft)

Population (2026-01-01)
  - Total: 499
  - Density: 34.8/km^{2} (90.1/sq mi)
- Time zone: UTC+1 (CET)
  - Summer (DST): UTC+2 (CEST)
- Postal codes: 281 46, 281 63
- Website: www.hornikruty.cz

Horní Kruty is a municipality and village in Kolín District in the Central Bohemian Region of the Czech Republic. It has about 500 inhabitants.

== Administrative division ==
Horní Kruty consists of five municipal parts (in brackets population according to the 2021 census):

- Horní Kruty (256)
- Bohouňovice II (85)
- Dolní Kruty (67)
- Přestavlky (31)
- Újezdec (62)

== History ==
The first written mention of Horní Kruty is from 1228.

== Demographics ==
Historical population
Year	Pop.	±%
1869	1,013	—
1880	1,087	+7.3%
1890	1,089	+0.2%
1900	1,069	−1.8%
1910	1,032	−3.5%
1921	1,051	+1.8%
1930	961	−8.6%
1950	686	−28.6%
1961	648	−5.5%
1970	598	−7.7%
1980	543	−9.2%
1991	502	−7.6%
2001	508	+1.2%
2011	508	+0.0%
2021	501	−1.4%
Source: Censuses
