= Ostružná (river) =

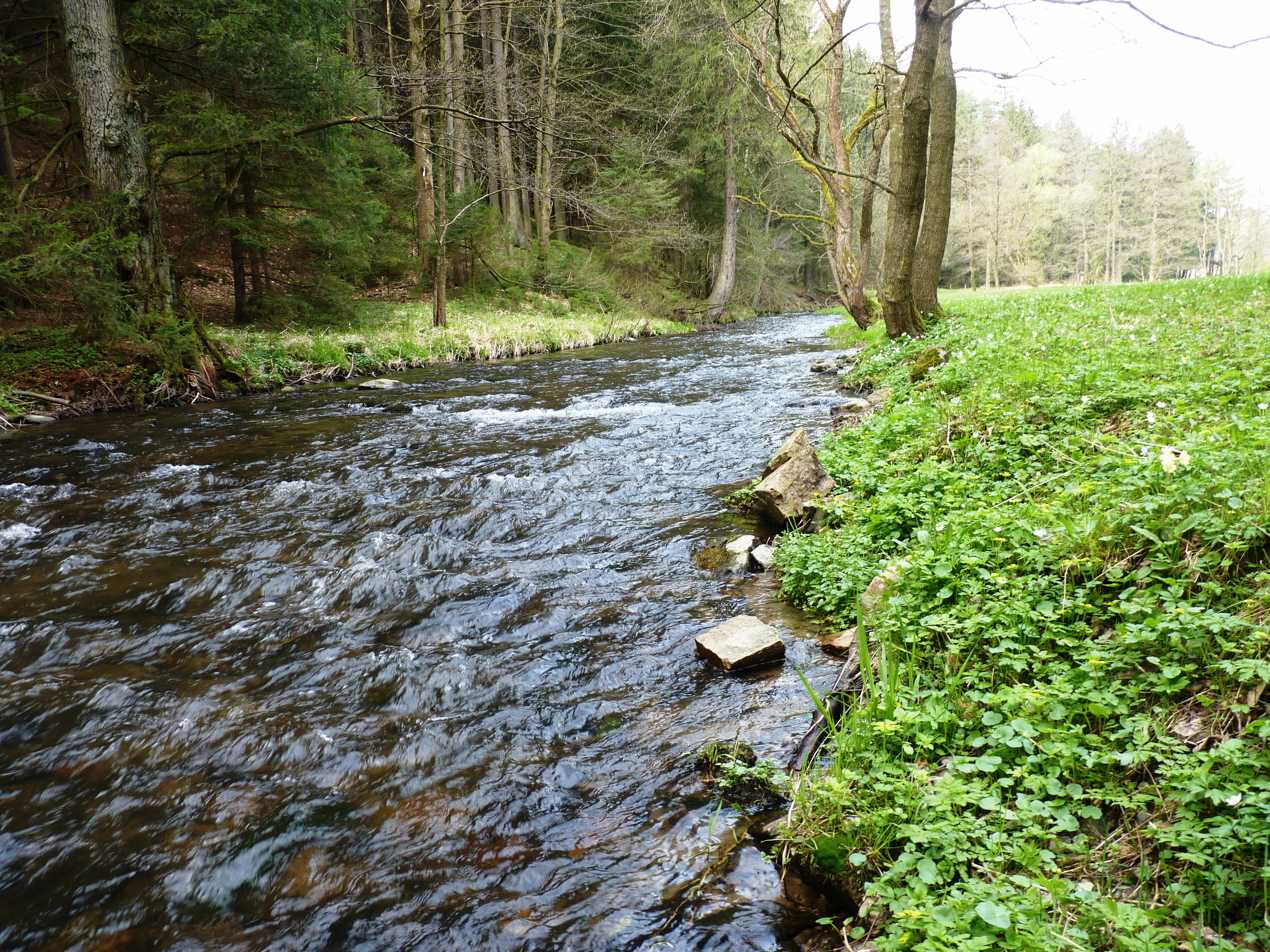
- The Ostružná in Velhartice

Location
- Country: Czech Republic
- Region: Plzeň

Physical characteristics
- Source
  - location: Čachrov, Bohemian Forest
  - coordinates: 49°11′36″N 13°20′3″E
  - elevation: 993 m (3,258 ft)
- Mouth
  - location: Otava
  - coordinates: 49°15′6″N 13°33′6″E
  - elevation: 454 m (1,490 ft)
- Length: 41.2 km (25.6 mi)
- Basin size: 172.5 km^{2} (66.6 sq mi)
- Discharge
  - average: 1.02 m^{3}/s (36 cu ft/s) in Kolinec

Basin features
- Progression: Otava→ Vltava→ Elbe→ North Sea

The Ostružná is a river in the Czech Republic, a left tributary of the Otava River. It flows through the Plzeň Region. It is 41.2 km (25.6 mi) long.

== Characteristic ==
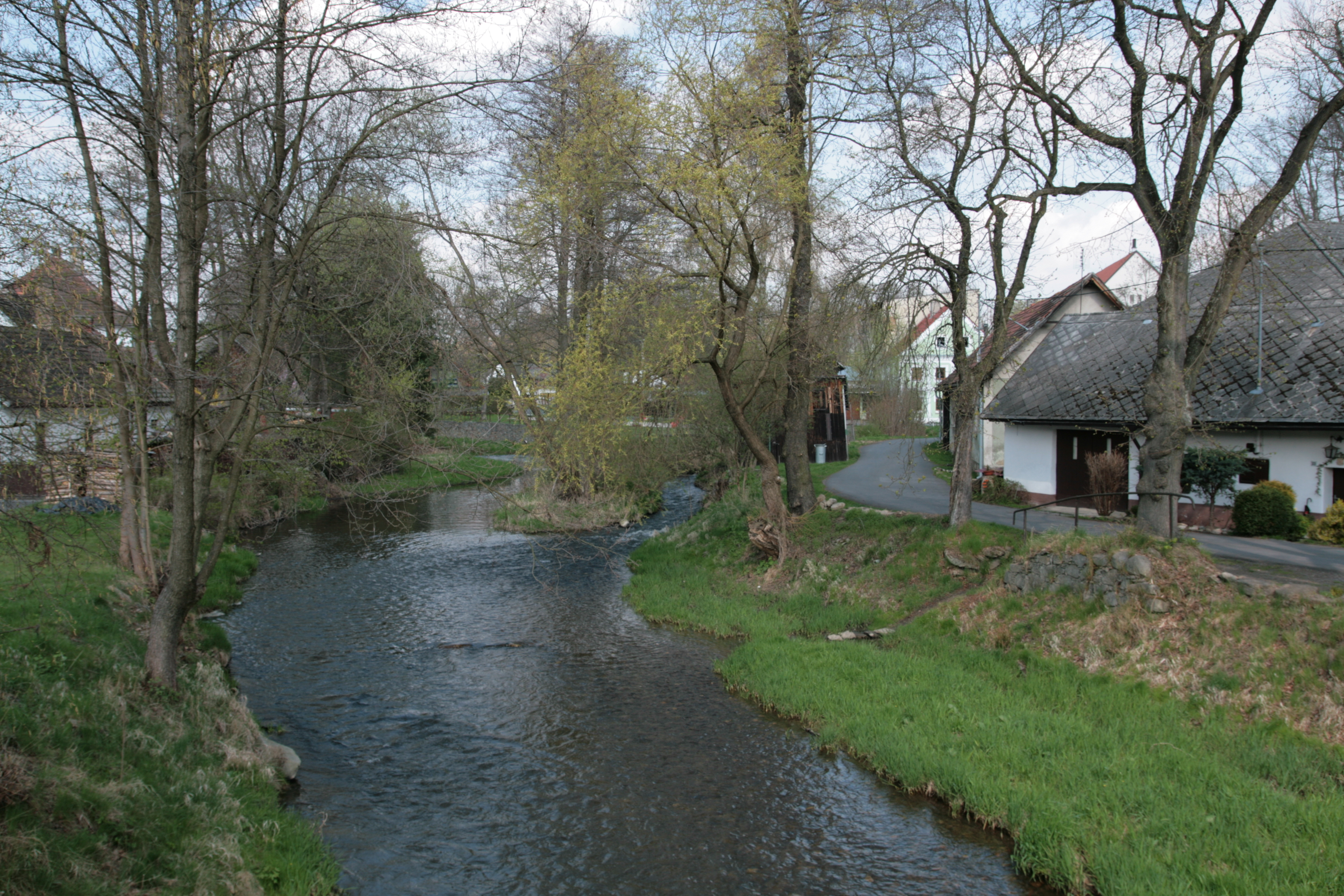
The Ostružná in Hrádek

The Ostružná originates in the territory of Čachrov in the Bohemian Forest at an elevation of 993 m (3,258 ft) and flows to Sušice, where it enters the Otava River at an elevation of 454 m (1,490 ft). It is 41.2 km (25.6 mi) long. Its drainage basin has an area of 172.5 km^{2} (66.6 sq mi). The average discharge at 13.4 river km in Kolinec is 1.02 m^{3}/s (36 cu ft/s).

The longest tributaries of the Ostružná are:

Tributary	Length (km)	Side
Kalný potok (Note: These are two different tributaries and the identical name is just a coincidence.)	8.5	right
Kalný potok	6.7	left
Jindřichovický potok	6.7	left

== Course ==
The river flows through the municipal territories of Čachrov, Hartmanice, Běšiny, Velhartice, Kolinec, Mokrosuky, Hrádek and Sušice.

== Bodies of water ==
There are 167 bodies of water in the basin area. The largest of them is the fishpond Velká Strana with an area of 18.4 ha (45 acres). There are no fishponds or reservoirs built directly on the Ostružná.

== See also ==
- List of rivers of the Czech Republic
