= Mokrosuky =

- Municipality
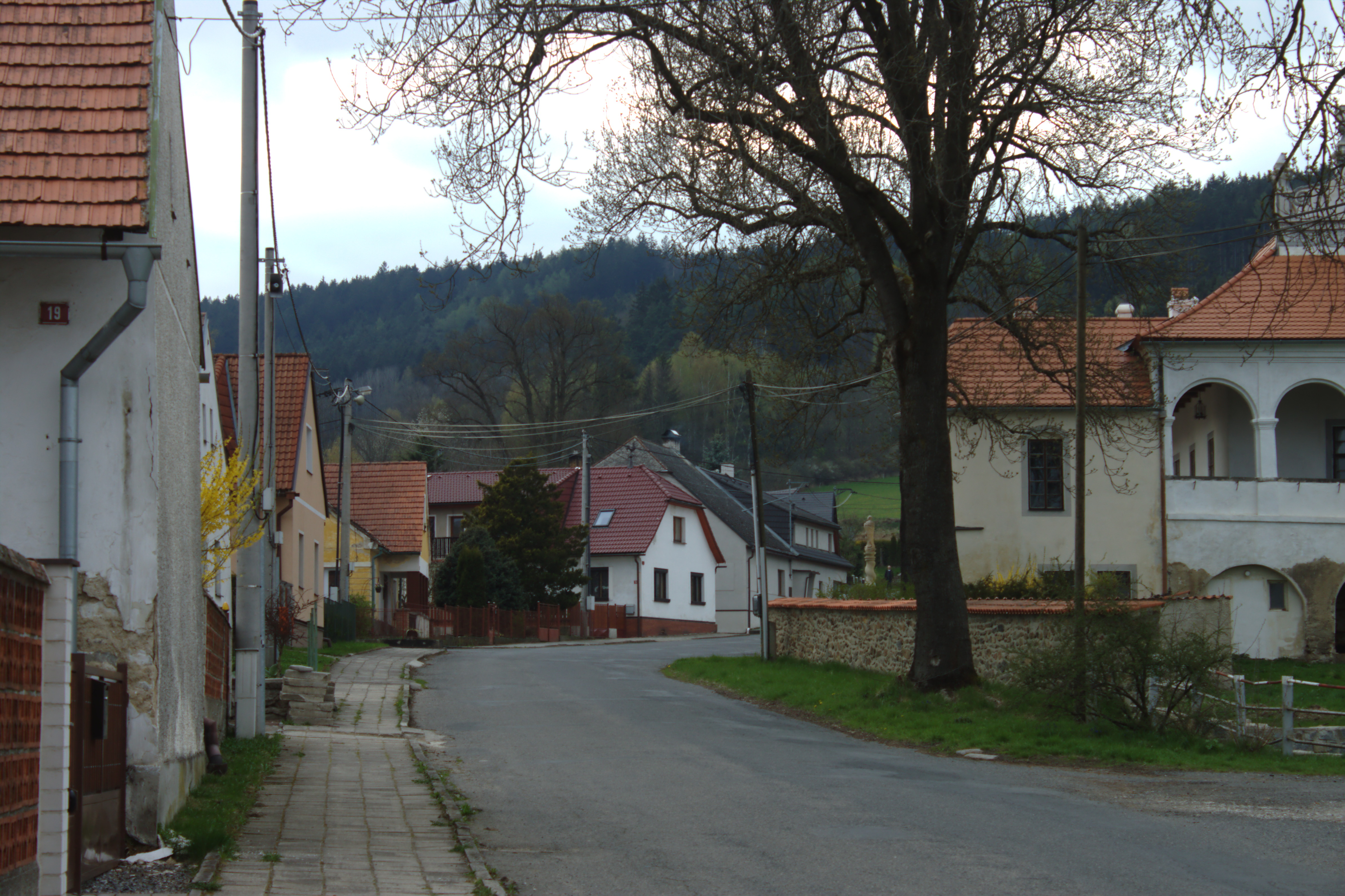
- Main street

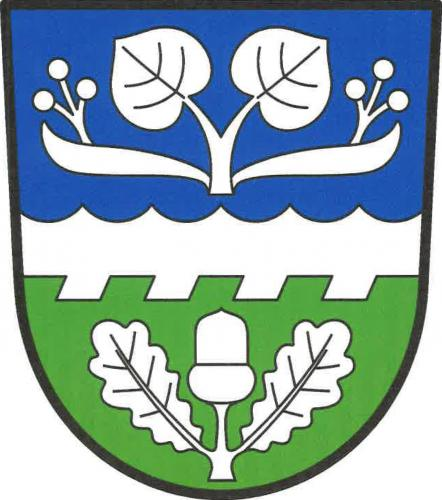
- Flag Coat of arms

- Location in the Czech Republic
- Coordinates: 49°16′32″N 13°27′17″E
- Country: Czech Republic
- Region: Plzeň
- District: Klatovy
- First mentioned: 1418

Area
  - Total: 6.97 km^{2} (2.69 sq mi)
- Elevation: 532 m (1,745 ft)

Population (2026-01-01)
  - Total: 144
  - Density: 20.7/km^{2} (53.5/sq mi)
- Time zone: UTC+1 (CET)
  - Summer (DST): UTC+2 (CEST)
- Postal code: 342 01
- Website: www.mokrosuky.cz

Mokrosuky is a municipality and village in Klatovy District in the Plzeň Region of the Czech Republic. It has about 100 inhabitants.

== Administrative division ==
Mokrosuky consists of two municipal parts (in brackets population according to the 2021 census):

- Mokrosuky (120)
- Lešišov (14)

== Etymology ==
The name is derived from the surname Mokrý Suk, meaning "the settlement of Mokrý Suk family".

== Geography ==
Mokrosuky is located about 17 kilometres (11 mi) southeast of Klatovy and 50 km (31 mi) south of Plzeň. It lies in the Bohemian Forest Foothills. The highest point is at 687 m (2,254 ft) above sea level. The Ostružná River flows through the municipality.

== History ==
The first written mention of Mokrosuky is from 1418. Until 1560, it belonged to the Velhartice estate. In 1560, the village was annexed to the Kolinec estate.

== Demographics ==
Historical population

Year	Pop.	±%
1869	448	—
1880	486	+8.5%
1890	452	−7.0%
1900	471	+4.2%
1910	468	−0.6%

Year	Pop.	±%
1921	446	−4.7%
1930	422	−5.4%
1950	302	−28.4%
1961	310	+2.6%
1970	254	−18.1%

Year	Pop.	±%
1980	211	−16.9%
1991	182	−13.7%
2001	144	−20.9%
2011	122	−15.3%
2021	134	+9.8%

Source: Censuses

== Transport ==
The railway line Klatovy–Horažďovice runs through the municipality. However, the train station named Mokrosuky is located in the territory of neighbouring Hrádek-Kašovice.

== Sights ==
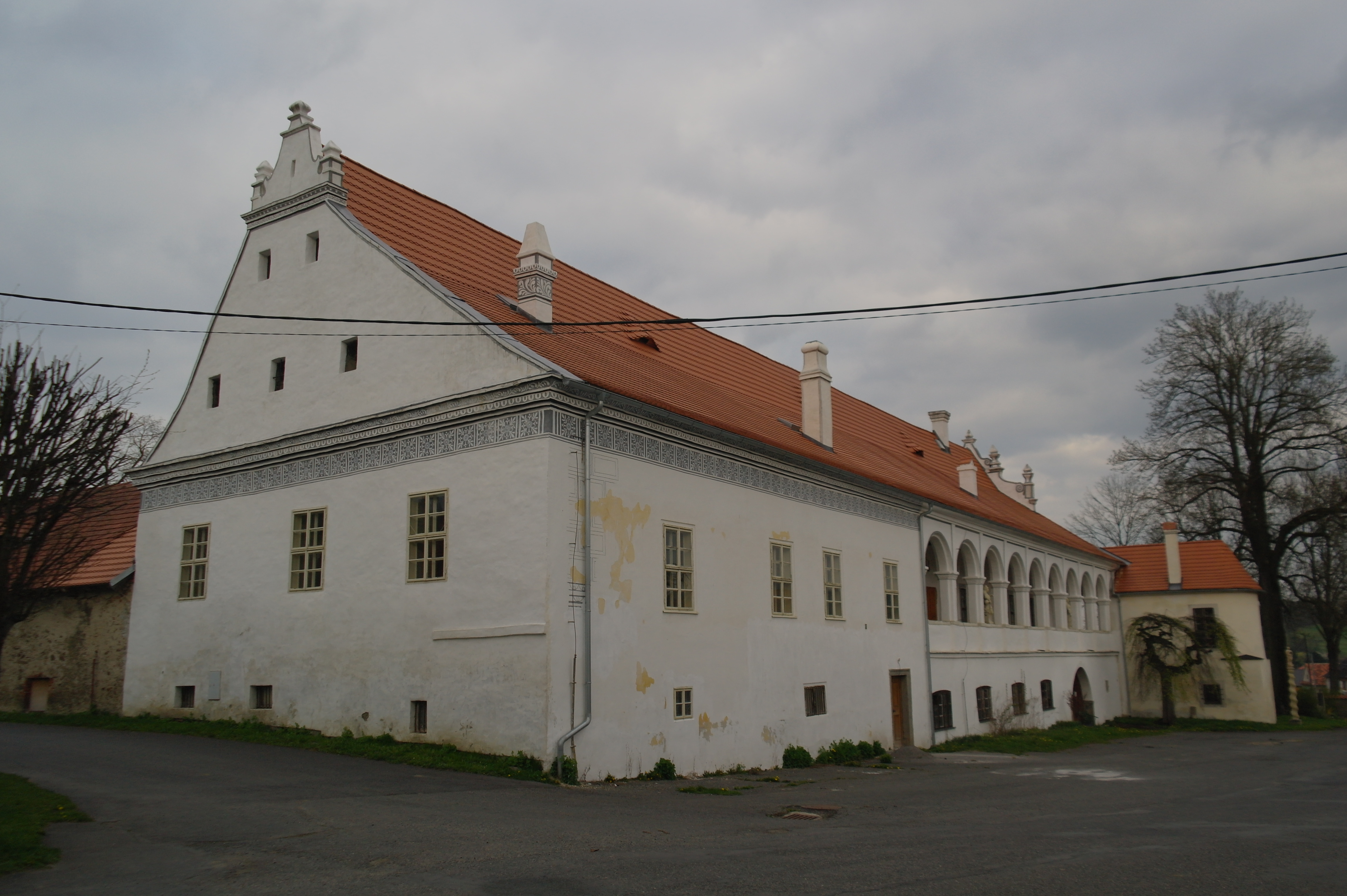
Mokrosuky Castle

The most important monument is the former Gothic water fortress from the 15th century, rebuilt into a Renaissance castle in 1579. Today it open to the public.

The Chapel of Saint Wenceslaus dates from the end of the 18th century. At the end of the 19th century, it was reconstructed in the pseudo-Gothic style.

== Notable people ==
- Václav Vojta (1917–2000), medical doctor
