= Ivan Roubal =

Czechoslovak serial killer

- Born: 12 May 1951; Czechoslovakia
- Died: 29 June 2015 (aged 64); Karviná Prison, Czech Republic
- Conviction: Murder
- Penalty: Life imprisonment

Details
- Victims: 5–8
- Span of crimes: 1991–1994
- Country: Czechoslovakia, later Czech Republic
- States: Čachrov, Zákupy, Prague, Veselí nad Lužnicí, Letňany

Ivan Roubal (12 May 1951 – 29 June 2015) was a Czechoslovak serial killer who was convicted of five murders.

== Life ==
=== Youth ===
Ivan Roubal studied at an agricultural school and graduated in 1970. He worked at the Czechoslovak State Railways as a junior railroad engineer, train operator, worker at a heat-only boiler station, woodcutter and zootechnician. He married in 1973, his son being born the following year (he died in a traffic incident in 2012).

In the late 1980s, he briefly worked for the Jehovah's Witnesses. However, his expectations were not fulfilled, so he left before the revolution began and devoted himself to mysticism and occultism. He later extended his religious engagement to the Catholic Church. When his crimes were investigated, he demanded the testimony of cardinal Miloslav Vlk and Abbot of the Brevnov Monastery Jan Anastáz Opasek. See below.

=== Murders ===
During 1991, Roubal rented a farmhouse at Čachrov called Fairy Tale., where he kept hens and pigs. That's where he met František Heppner, who wanted to convert the farmhouse into a water sawmill. Heppner disappeared in December 1991, along with his Russian girlfriend Natasha. The reason for their abrupt disappearance was, according to Roubal, a trip to Germany. No one suspected anything until Roubal began using their car and selling their furniture. One of Roubal's sons also supposedly said that his father killed both Heppner and Natasha and had given their bodies to the pigs, however, he denied ever saying that in court. The court acquitted him of these murders, saying that if the bodies were not found, it could not be ruled out that Heppner and Natasha were still alive.

On 26 July 1992, taxi driver Vladimir Strnad disappeared. He was last seen leaving Prague along with Roubal, driving off in separate cars. The body was dumped in a septic tank in Božíkov, Zákupy. The following day, Roubal began to use both of their cars. The body was found on 25 May 1993, being in such an advanced stage of decay that it was impossible to determine the cause of death.

On 10 December 1992, Václav Horký, a jewellery seller, disappeared. After his disappearance, Roubal started using his vehicle as well and tried to sell his house. To this day, Horký has not been located. In 1995, the court declared him dead in absentia.

On 26 May 1993, Roubal became acquainted with Josef Suchánek through an ad. He killed him and dumped his body in a pond in Veselí nad Lužnicí. He also burgled his apartment. The body was not found until 3 October of the same year when the pond was drained.

On 12 November 1993, Václav Dlouhý, who made a living through selling porn movies, was found dead in his apartment in Letňany. He was hogtied and his apartment was burgled as well. Roubal later defended himself saying that Dlouhý regularly engaged in sadomasochistic practices.

On 8 March 1994, Roubal committed his last murders. In the evening he came to the ZAPAP car rental office, which was located in the basement of Pod Zvonařkou 2238/4, Prague 2, where he encountered the owner Petr Kudrna, Peter Magdolen and the occasional visitor of the taxi driver Jiří Semerád. He tied them all together with their legs around their necks. He then burgled the office and disappeared. Kudrna and Magdolen were strangled with the weight of their own legs, but Semerád managed to free himself and call the police. On 30 March, Roubal was arrested.

=== Conviction ===
The trial began in 1996. Many scandals surrounded it, one of them being that Judge Jiří Horký forgot to prolong Roubal's detention and he had to be released on 30 September 1997 from the remand prison. Horký's mistake was fixed by police officers who arrested Roubal for suspicion of other crimes (death threats to witnesses, members of the Prison Service and prosecutors) before the prison gates in front of television cameras. In addition, it was suspected that Roubal would flee to Switzerland (there was a request for asylum lodged there). For misconduct, the judge was later punished by a disciplinary panel of the High Court with a twenty per cent reduction in salary. In 1998, Roubal was cleared of the murder charges and sentenced to five years in jail for robberies at the ZAPAP car rental. Semerád, the survivor, was unable to determine if he was the killer.

The end of the trial was accompanied by extensive security measures. Shortly before the judgment of Roubal, in the same courtroom, two defendants were almost kidnapped. In the final speech, a public prosecutor who had asked for life for Roubal, announced anonymously that there was an explosive in the courthouse. The building was cleared and searched. It was only after an hour and a half that negotiations could continue.

Roubal has repeatedly accused the police and justice of conspiracy, and even handed a copy of the letter to President Václav Havel to the judges in which he filed a motion to prosecute the Minister of Justice Vlasta Parkanová.

Mrs. Parkanová is the main organizer of the conspiracy against me and, in my opinion, along with other unknown offenders committed the crime of a criminal organization...

Roubal himself described himself as "the life prisoner of Havel's conscience", and he has signed hundreds of complaints. He also has asked the court to bring cardinal Miloslav Vlk and Abbot of the Břevnov Monastery Jan Anastáz Opasek in his case.

Roubal continually denied any responsibility, but the court recognized him as guilty of the murders of Kudrna and Magdolen, for which he was sentenced to 22 years in 1999. He was later convicted of the murders of Suchánek, Strnad and Dlouhý (he was not charged for Heppner, his Russian girlfriend or Horký because their bodies were never found, and if ever found, the sentence would not change) and was sentenced to life imprisonment in 2000.

Roubal stayed in jail with constant complaints. In 2010, he sued the VZP insurance company for refusing to provide self-supporting stockings for varicose veins. He also accused the prison service which, according to him, gave him improper treatment worsening his state of health. After each defendant, he claimed 200 thousand crowns as compensation. He also filed a lawsuit with the Ministry of Justice that the prison service had improperly imposed a five-day isolation on his prison service, allegedly not being able to get a job, so he could make money for special medical aids and alleged walking. His complaints were rejected in November 2012. With his murders, Roubal was one of the leading serial killers in the Czech Republic. Psychiatrists have found that Roubal's IQ is 112.

He died in jail in Karviná on 29 June 2015.

== Media ==
Roubal was portrayed by Hynek Čermák in the 2021 miniseries Případ Roubal (Roubal Case).

== See also ==
- List of serial killers by country

== Literature ==
- Jaromír Slušný: Black Book of Czech Bestial Assassins, XYZ, Prague 2006, ISBN 80-87021-06-1, pg. 160-176
