= Václav Vojta =

Czech medical doctor

- Born: 12 July 1917; Mokrosuky, Bohemia, Austria-Hungary
- Died: 12 September 2000 (aged 83); Munich, Germany
- Education: Charles University
- Occupations: Neurologist; Physiotherapist; Pediatrician
- Known for: Reflex locomotion
- Awards: Czech Medal of Merit
- Website: www.vojta.com

Václav Vojta (12 July 1917 – 12 September 2000) was a Czech medical doctor who specialized in the treatment of children with cerebral palsy and developmental disorders. He discovered the principle of reflex locomotion, which is used to treat various physical and neuromuscular disorders through the stimulation of the human sensomotoric system's reflex points. Originally used in the treatment of spastic children, the technique is now used on babies and adults.

== Biography ==
=== Early life and education ===
Vojta began his studies in Prague in 1937, but due to the Nazi occupation, he was forced to postpone them, eventually earning his doctoral degree 10 years later, in 1947. He pursued training in pediatric neurology, working in the clinic at Charles University in Prague, and in 1956, he became head of the Department of Pediatric Neurology at the 4th Neurological Clinic of the Medical Faculty of Charles University in Prague. Dr. Vojta is most noted for his work in developmental kinesiology and his discovery of reflex locomotion therapy, which became broadly known as the Vojta Method.

=== Exile in Germany ===
In 1968, Soviet troops invaded Czechoslovakia, disrupting Vojta’s work and posing a threat to his professional future. Vojta, along with his wife and three small children, sought refuge in Germany. There, Vojta began work as a research fellow at the Orthopedic Clinic of the University of Cologne, pursuing his work in developmental kinesiological studies, and organizing courses in diagnostics and physical therapy. In 1975, Dr. Vojta relocated to Munich, taking a position at the Munich Children’s Centre, where he became head of the rehabilitation department.

In 1989, after the fall of the communist regime, Vojta returned to his native Czechoslovakia to receive tenure as Professor of Pediatric Neurology and Rehabilitation from Charles University in Prague, an honor denied him as a “politically unreliable person” under the Soviet regime. He was able to teach there once again, and continued to do so until his retirement in 1995. After his retirement, Vojta continued to lecture and teach around the world until his death in 2000.

== Career ==
=== The Vojta Method ===
Vojta’s research was focused on reflex locomotion therapy, particularly in the treatment of children exhibiting developmental delays. He discovered the basis of reflex locomotion while searching for treatment therapies for children with cerebral palsy and spastic paralysis. He discovered that muscle groups that the children could not activate themselves can be activated by applying pressure to specific zones on a patient’s body. Repeated activation resulted in improved gait, better posture and improved speech in children with cerebral palsy.

Professor Vojta recognized that many of the movement complexes he found could be traced to common subjective global patterns of movement that mark developmental milestones in healthy children. Although the emphasis of Vojta’s work was initially directed to pediatrics, he very soon recognized that the treatment could also be applied to neurological problems in adult patients. However, Vojta Therapy is most effective in patients under the age of six months, an age when early developmental changes are most profound.

Vojta therapists use a combination of 10 different zones on a patient's body, applying light pressure on a specific area and resistance to the current movement, causing the patient's body to involuntarily perform certain reflexive movement patterns. Repeated stimulation appears to make previously blocked neurological connections between the patient's spinal cord and brain. The patient is eventually able to perform similar movements without any external stimulation. Vojta Therapy has been used to treat cerebral palsy, peripheral paralysis of the arms and legs, hip dysplasia, and problems in breathing, swallowing and chewing.

In recent years, the principles underlying Vojta's method have been adapted to Dynamic Neuromuscular Stimulation or DNS, a modern iteration of Vojta therapy. DNS therapy has been successfully used to rehabilitate athletic injury and enhance performance, leading to a reduction in injury, decreased recovery time, and increased performance markers. When an adult athlete or patient is injured, they sometimes revert to an early pattern of locomotion similar to that of a young infant, before proper control was established. For example, a patient with a shoulder impingement may internally rotate and flex their arm in a way similar to a two-month-old child who has not yet developed external rotation and extension. In this case, DNS places an adult patient in a developmental position to re-teach proper control of the shoulder joint.

While Vojta Therapy has been recognized for decades as a viable treatment method throughout Europe and Asia, it has only recently made inroads in the United States, particularly among physical therapists.

== Published works and training ==
Vojta published over 100 scientific works and two textbooks, Cerebral Movement Disturbances in Infancy and The Vojta Principle, written with Anne Peters. Both have appeared in several editions and been translated into several languages. His works have inspired further research and additional scientific works worldwide.

In 1984, Vojta and his German colleagues formed the Vojta Society, dedicated to promoting and disseminating the principles of reflex locomotion in diagnostics and therapy, with the goal of training physiotherapists and physicians in the Vojta method. In 1998, the organization was renamed the International Vojta Society, over which Professor Vojta presided until his death. The non-profit society, with its headquarters in Munich, runs annual qualification seminars in Germany for health care professionals. Training around 150 doctors and physiotherapists a year, the qualification seminars focus on treatment of new-born babies, children and adults. Before his death, Professor Vojta traveled extensively, conducting seminars and training sessions worldwide.

== Awards and recognitions ==
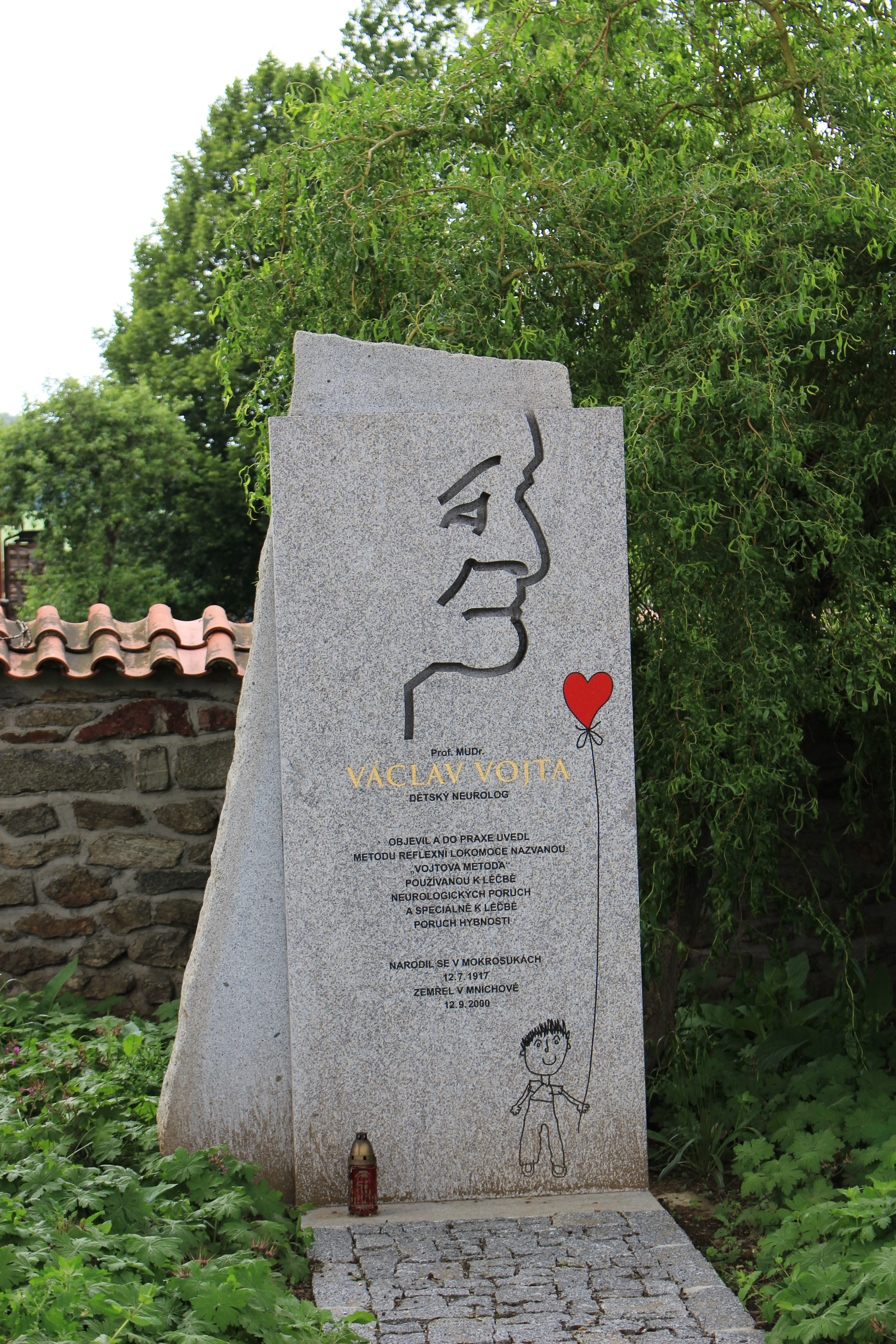
Memorial to Václav Vojta in Mokrosuky

Vojta received recognition in the form of awards and honors for his work throughout his career. In 1974 he was awarded the Heinrich Heine Prize, the highest award of the German Society for Orthopedics. In 1979 he received the "Growing with Each Other" Medal from the German association Aktion Sonnenschein for his work with disabled children. In 1983, he won the Ernst von Bergmann Prize for training in medicine from the German Medical Association. In 1990, Vojta was awarded the von Pfaundler Medal for training in pediatrics from the Professional Association of Pediatricians. In October 2000, Vojta was posthumously awarded the Czech Medal of Merit by Václav Havel, the president of the Czech Republic.
