= Reflex locomotion =

Treatment for physical and mental impairment

Reflex locomotion, usually referred to as the Vojta method, is a technique for the treatment of physical and mental impairment in humans. It was developed by Václav Vojta.

Based on studies of treatments for spastic children for muscular disorders in the 1950s, a number of reflex points were identified which can be used to stimulate the human body to crawl and turn. By applying pressure to the appropriate reflex points the major muscle groups in the body are activated, breathing becomes regulated and mental activity increases.

The Vojta method has been classified as alternative medicine by some sources, but studies seem to confirm its efficacy for orthopedic and neurologic problems.
