= Johann Král =

Johann Král (16 May 1823 – 10 June 1912) was an Austrian Empire-born player of the viola and viola d'amore.

Král was born in Kolinec, Austrian Empire, and studied at Prague Conservatory with Friedrich Wilhelm Pixis. From 1842 to 1850 he was violist at the Estates Theatre in Prague. He appeared as a soloist at the Gewandhaus in Leipzig, and at the court in Weimar. From 1851 to 1855 he was a member of the Vienna Philharmonic.

He arranged music for the viola d'amore; he published in 1870 Anleitung zum Spiele der Viola d’amour für Violinspieler ("Instructions for playing the viola d'amore, for violinists").
