= Běšiny =

- Municipality
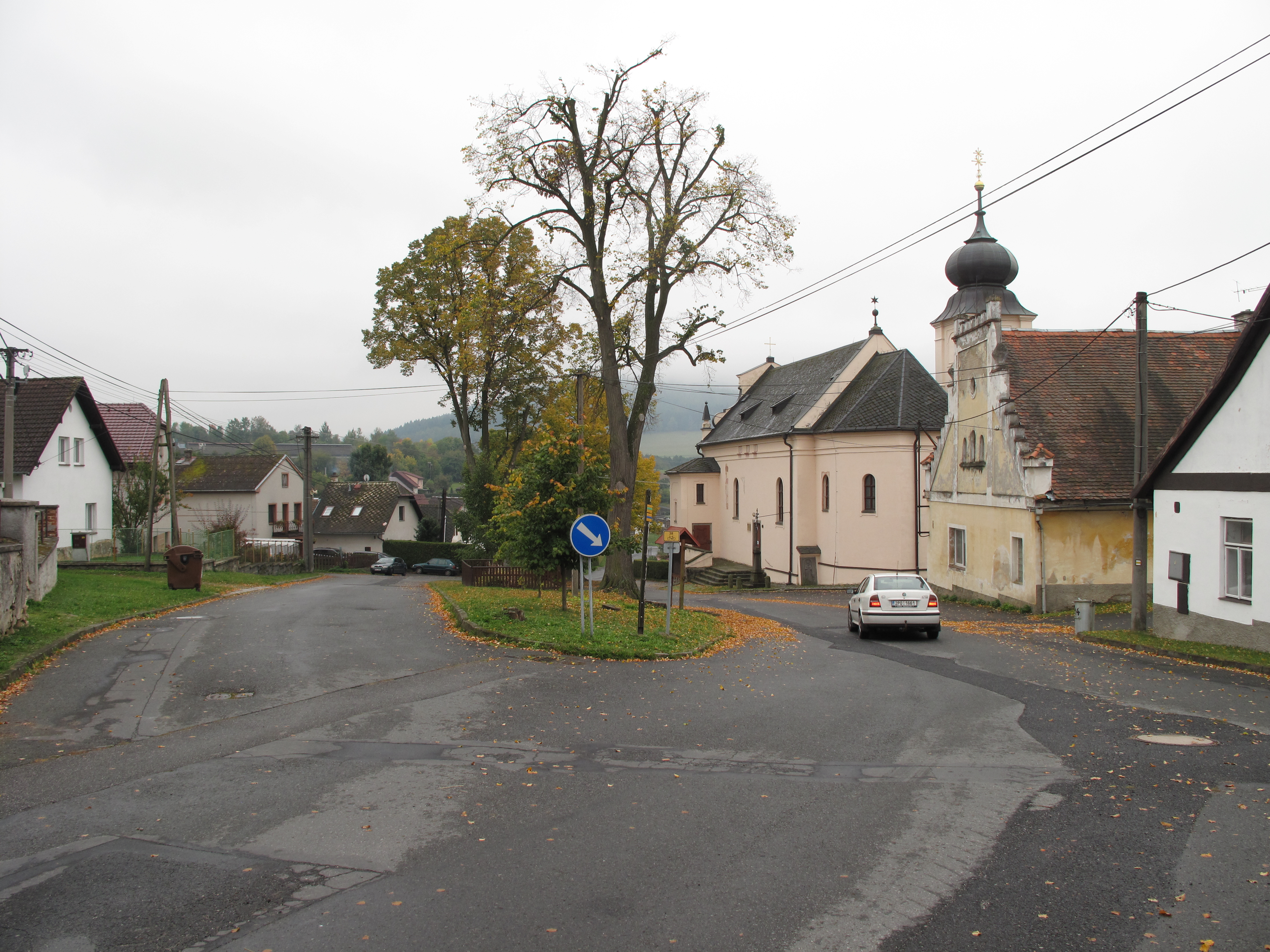
- Centre of Běšiny

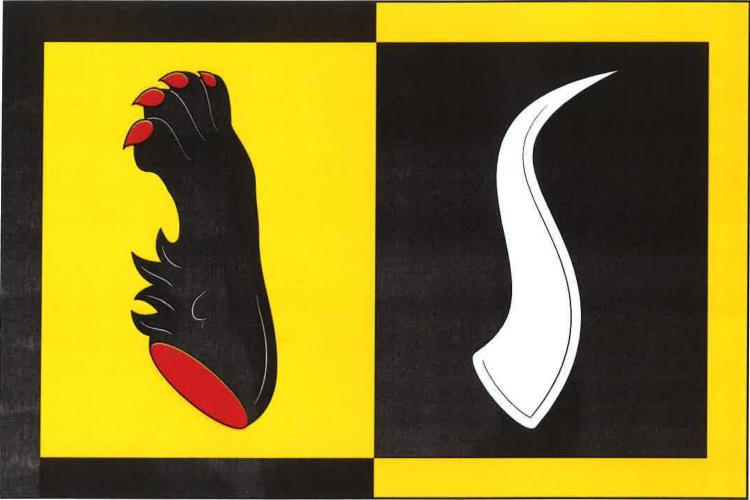
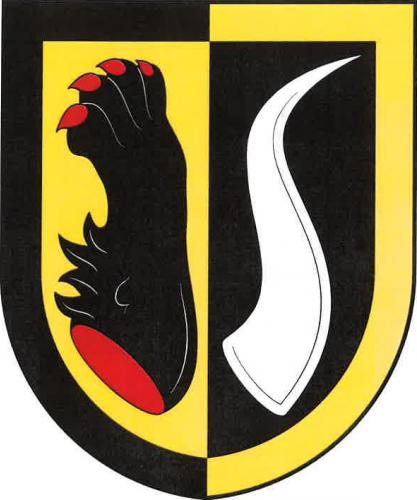
- Flag Coat of arms

- Location in the Czech Republic
- Coordinates: 49°18′6″N 13°18′45″E
- Country: Czech Republic
- Region: Plzeň
- District: Klatovy
- First mentioned: 1379

Area
  - Total: 16.04 km^{2} (6.19 sq mi)
- Elevation: 482 m (1,581 ft)

Population (2026-01-01)
  - Total: 815
  - Density: 50.8/km^{2} (132/sq mi)
- Time zone: UTC+1 (CET)
  - Summer (DST): UTC+2 (CEST)
- Postal code: 339 01
- Website: www.besiny.cz

Běšiny is a municipality and village in Klatovy District in the Plzeň Region of the Czech Republic. It has about 800 inhabitants.

Běšiny lies approximately 11 kilometres (7 mi) south of Klatovy, 50 km (31 mi) south of Plzeň, and 119 km (74 mi) south-west of Prague.

== Administrative division ==
Běšiny consists of six municipal parts (in brackets population according to the 2021 census):

- Běšiny (584)
- Hořákov (22)
- Hubenov (8)
- Kozí (130)
- Rajské (16)
- Úloh (59)

== History ==
The first written mention of Běšiny is from 1379.

== Demographics ==
Historical population
Year	Pop.	±%
1869	1,366	—
1880	1,310	−4.1%
1890	1,379	+5.3%
1900	1,434	+4.0%
1910	1,475	+2.9%
1921	1,520	+3.1%
1930	1,374	−9.6%
1950	1,023	−25.5%
1961	1,075	+5.1%
1970	995	−7.4%
1980	893	−10.3%
1991	878	−1.7%
2001	859	−2.2%
2011	830	−3.4%
2021	819	−1.3%
Source: Censuses
