= Kolinec =

- Market town
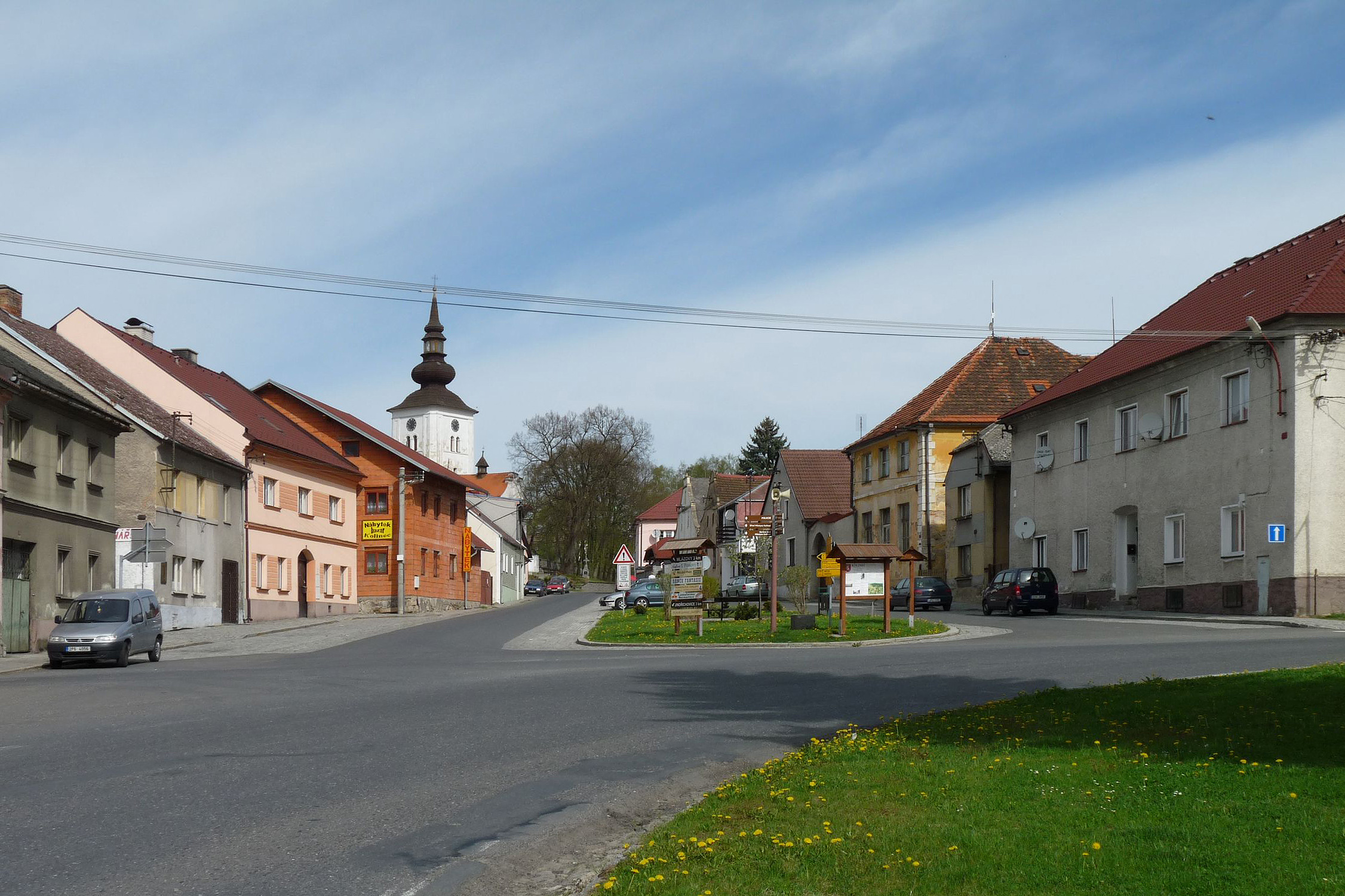
- Town square

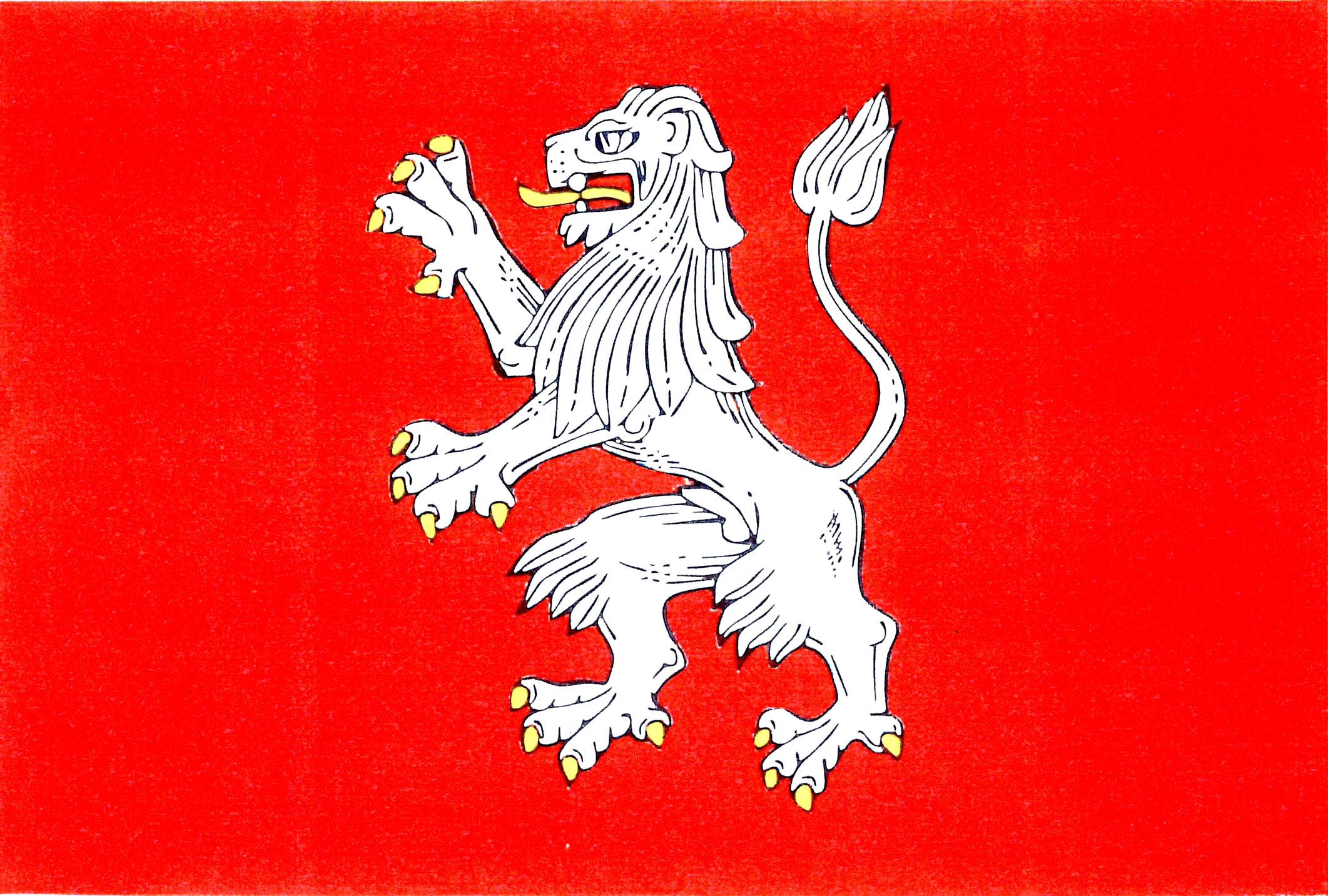
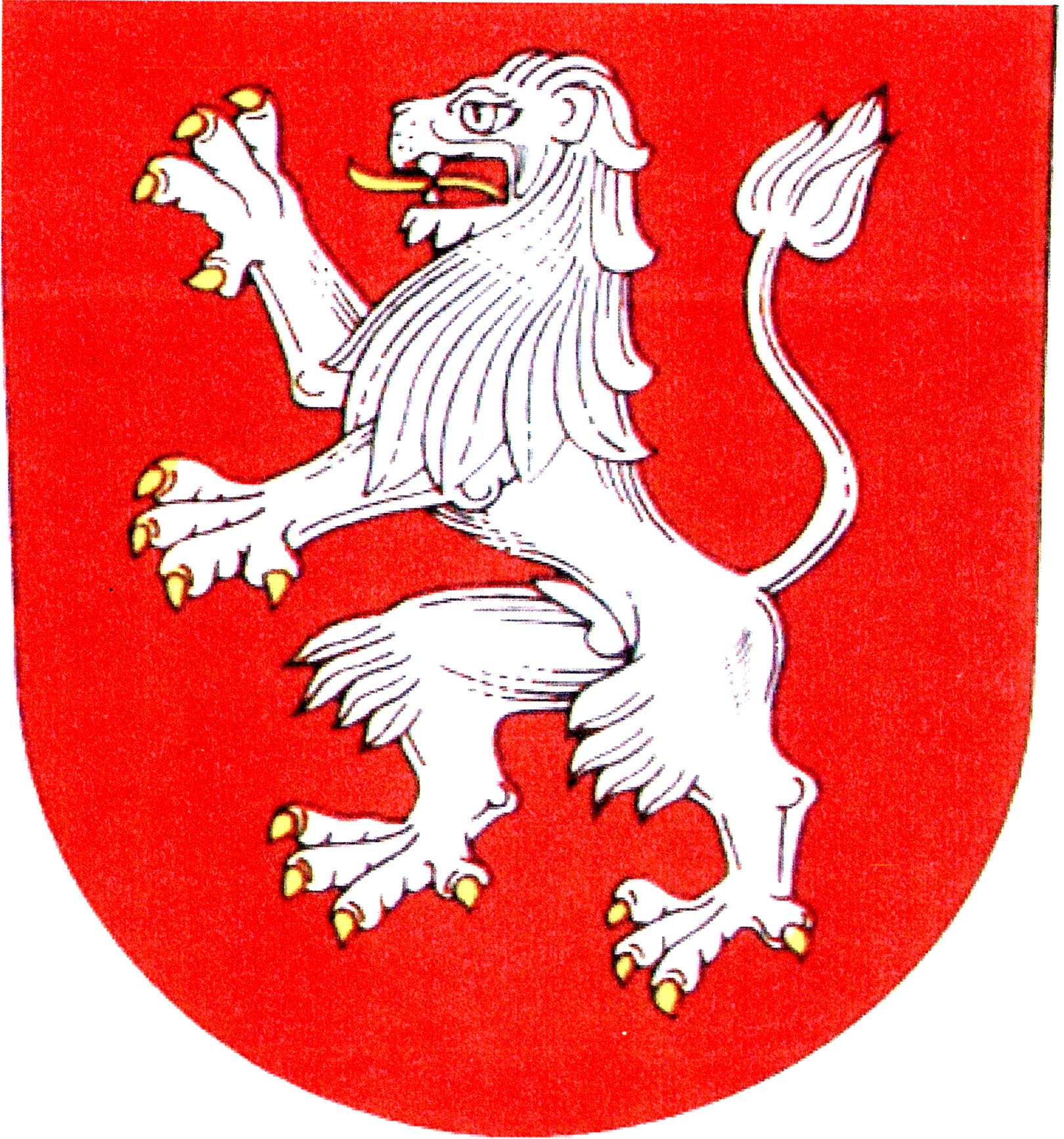
- Flag Coat of arms

- Location in the Czech Republic
- Coordinates: 49°17′57″N 13°26′12″E
- Country: Czech Republic
- Region: Plzeň
- District: Klatovy
- First mentioned: 1290

Area
  - Total: 48.72 km^{2} (18.81 sq mi)
- Elevation: 545 m (1,788 ft)

Population (2026-01-01)
  - Total: 1,427
  - Density: 29.29/km^{2} (75.86/sq mi)
- Time zone: UTC+1 (CET)
  - Summer (DST): UTC+2 (CEST)
- Postal code: 341 42
- Website: www.kolinec.cz

Kolinec (Czech pronunciation: [ˈkolɪnɛts]; German: Kolinetz) is a market town in Klatovy District in the Plzeň Region of the Czech Republic. It has about 1,400 inhabitants.

== Administrative division ==
Kolinec consists of 18 municipal parts (in brackets population according to the 2021 census):

- Kolinec (761)
- Bernartice (19)
- Boříkovy (11)
- Brod (21)
- Buršice (29)
- Hradiště (2)
- Javoří (13)
- Jindřichovice (78)
- Lukoviště (31)
- Malonice (124)
- Mlázovy (87)
- Podolí (26)
- Sluhov (12)
- Střítež (33)
- Tajanov (19)
- Tržek (23)
- Ujčín (84)
- Vlčkovice (28)

== Etymology ==
The initial Latin name Staetlino was derived from old German stetelin, i.e. 'little town', 'little place'. In the 14th century, the settlement received the Latin name Colonia. Since there was already one larger town with this name in the country (Kolín), the name began to be used in diminutive form (Colonia minor in Latin, Kolinec in Czech).

== Geography ==
Kolinec is located about 15 kilometres (9 mi) southeast of Klatovy and 48 km (30 mi) south of Plzeň. It lies on the border between the Blatná Uplands and Bohemian Forest Foothills. The highest point is at 760 m (2,490 ft) above sea level. The Ostružná River flows through the market town. The Úslava River originates in the municipal territory, near the village of Lukoviště. There are several fishponds in the territory.

== History ==
The first written mention of Kolinec is from 1290. It was probably founded as a settlement of gold panners. Until the mid-14th century, it was owned by Bohemian queens, then it was granted to the Lords of Velhartice. In 1506, Kolinec became property of Zdeněk Lev of Rožmitál, during whose reign great development occurred.

== Demographics ==
Historical population

Year	Pop.	±%
1869	4,323	—
1880	4,180	−3.3%
1890	4,045	−3.2%
1900	3,849	−4.8%
1910	3,912	+1.6%

Year	Pop.	±%
1921	3,981	+1.8%
1930	3,708	−6.9%
1950	2,609	−29.6%
1961	2,514	−3.6%
1970	2,039	−18.9%

Year	Pop.	±%
1980	1,705	−16.4%
1991	1,515	−11.1%
2001	1,413	−6.7%
2011	1,422	+0.6%
2021	1,401	−1.5%

Source: Censuses

== Transport ==
Kolinec is located on the railway line Klatovy–Horažďovice.

== Sights ==
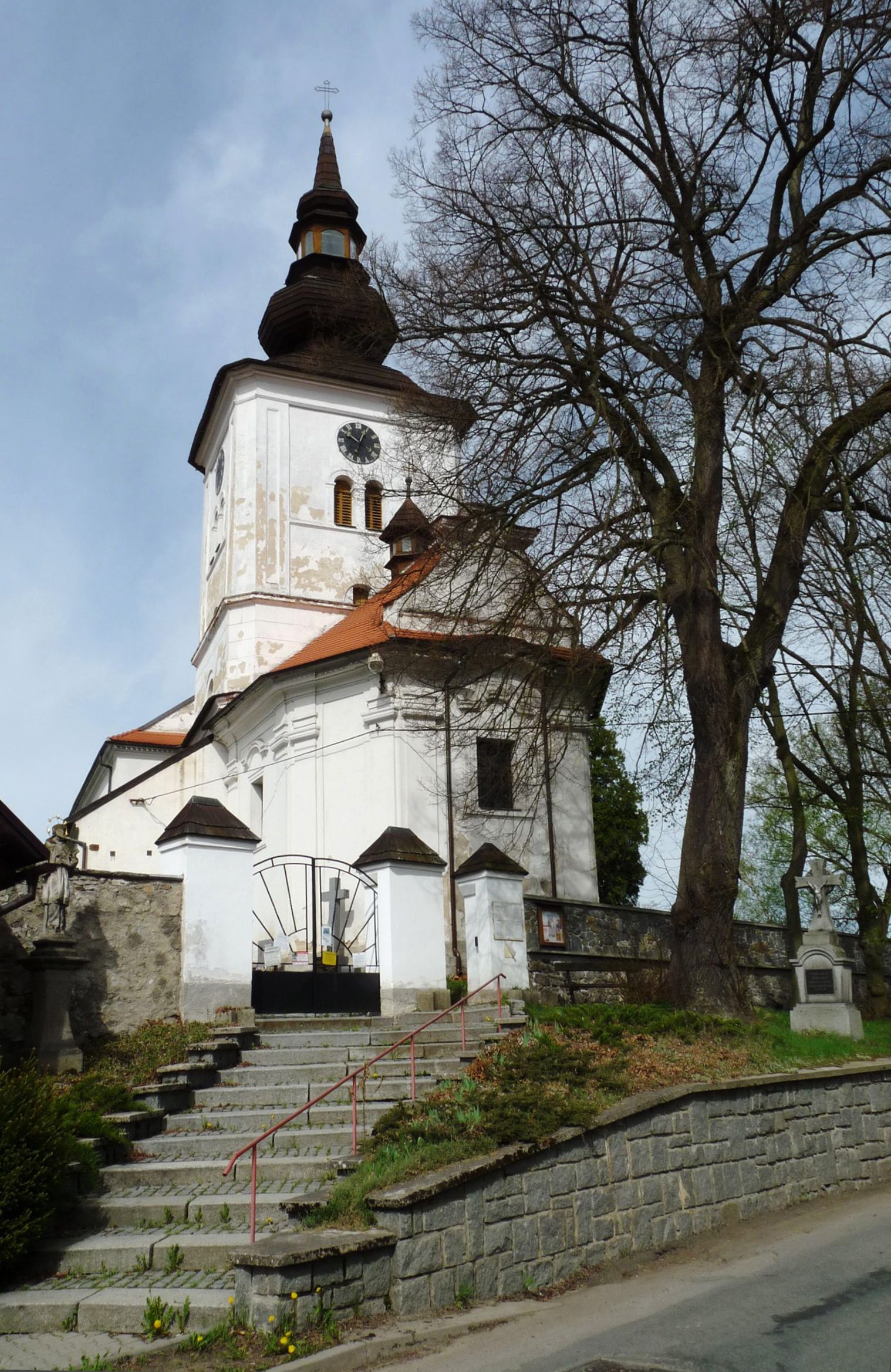
Church of Saint James the Great

The Church of Saint James the Great was originally a fortified Romanesque church from the end of the 12th century. It was rebuilt in the Baroque style in 1727–1730 and in 1749–1755, but retained its Romanesque core. The tower was added in 1854.

The Church of Saint John the Baptist is Mlázovy is an early Gothic building from the first half of the 14th century.

In the territory of Kolinec are several small castles that once served as aristrocratic residences and are now cultural monuments.

== Notable people ==
- Johann Král (1823–1912), musician

== Twin towns – sister cities ==
Kolinec is twinned with:

- Tápiószentmárton, Hungary
- Zemianska Olča, Slovakia

== Gallery ==
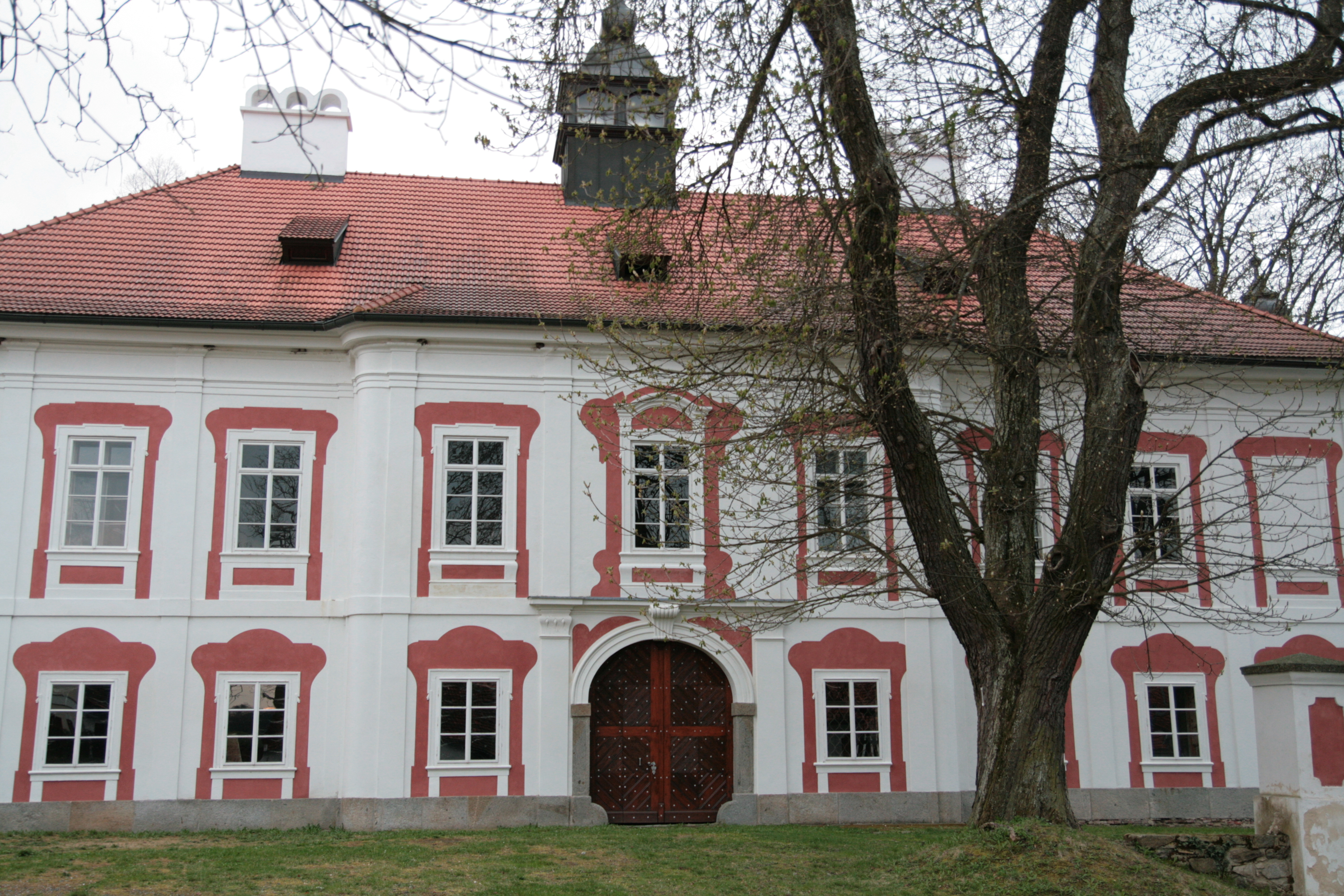
Mlázovy Castle

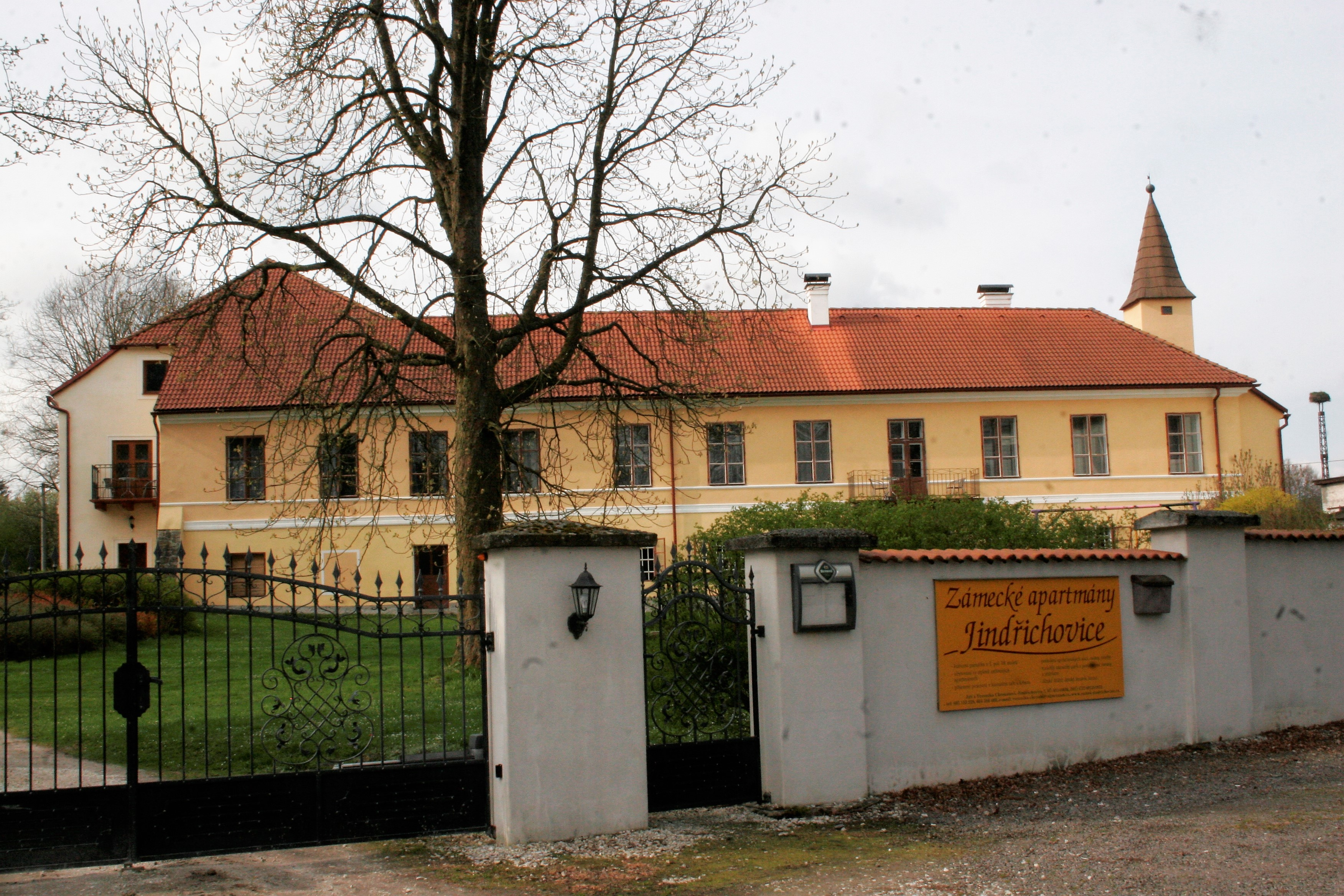
Jindřichovice Castle

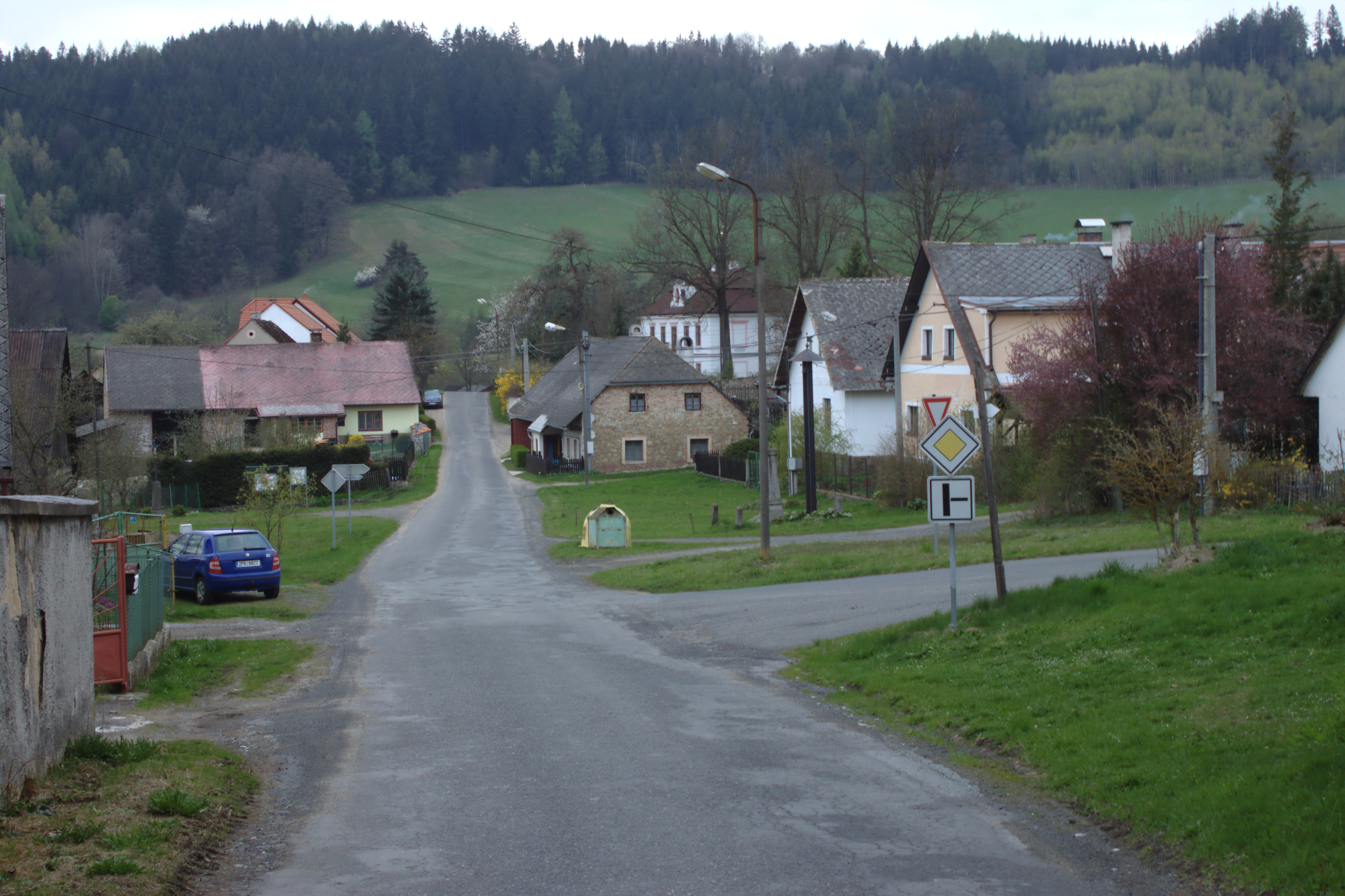
The village of Podolí
