= Čachrov =

- Market town
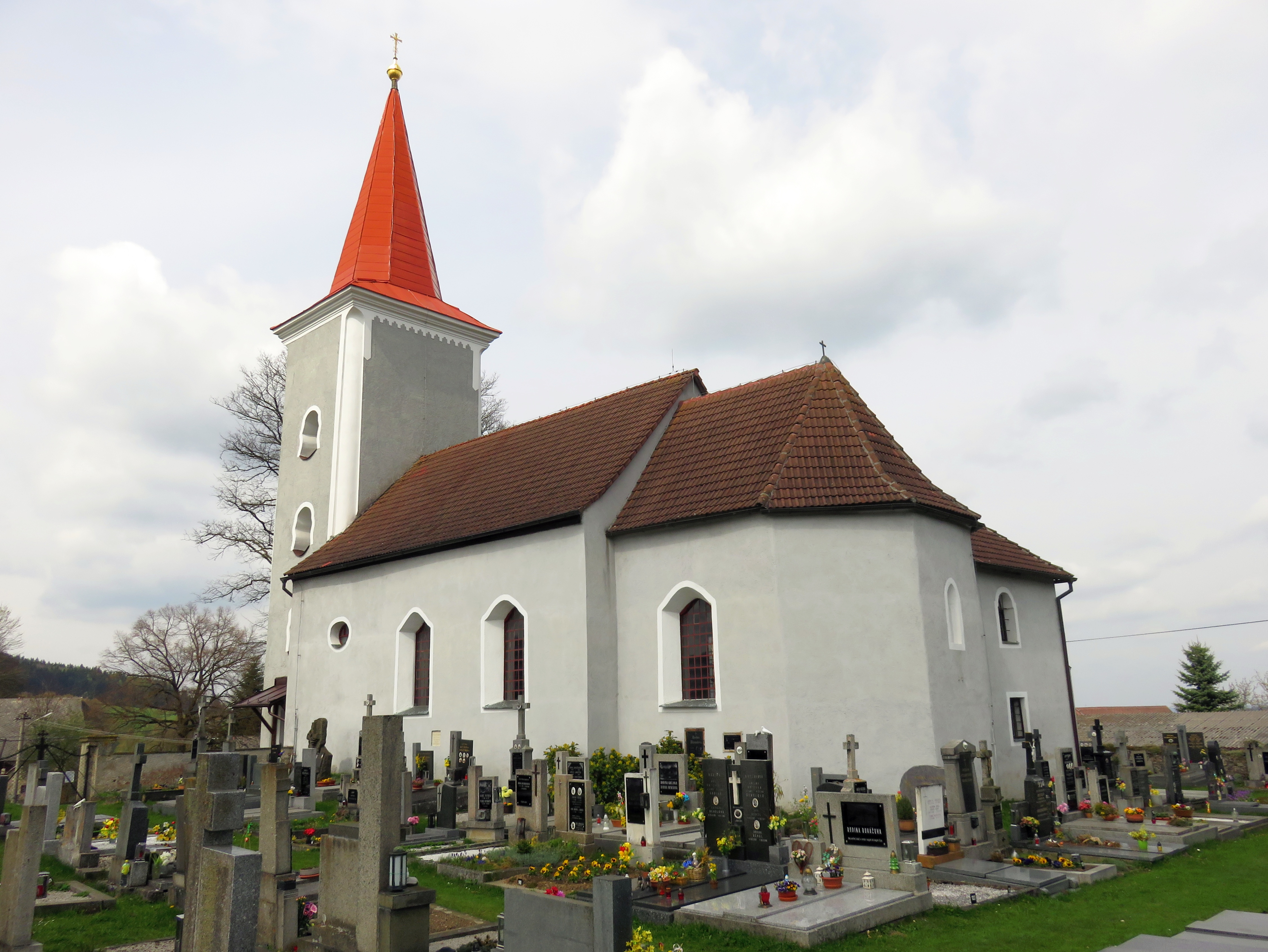
- Church of Saint Wenceslaus

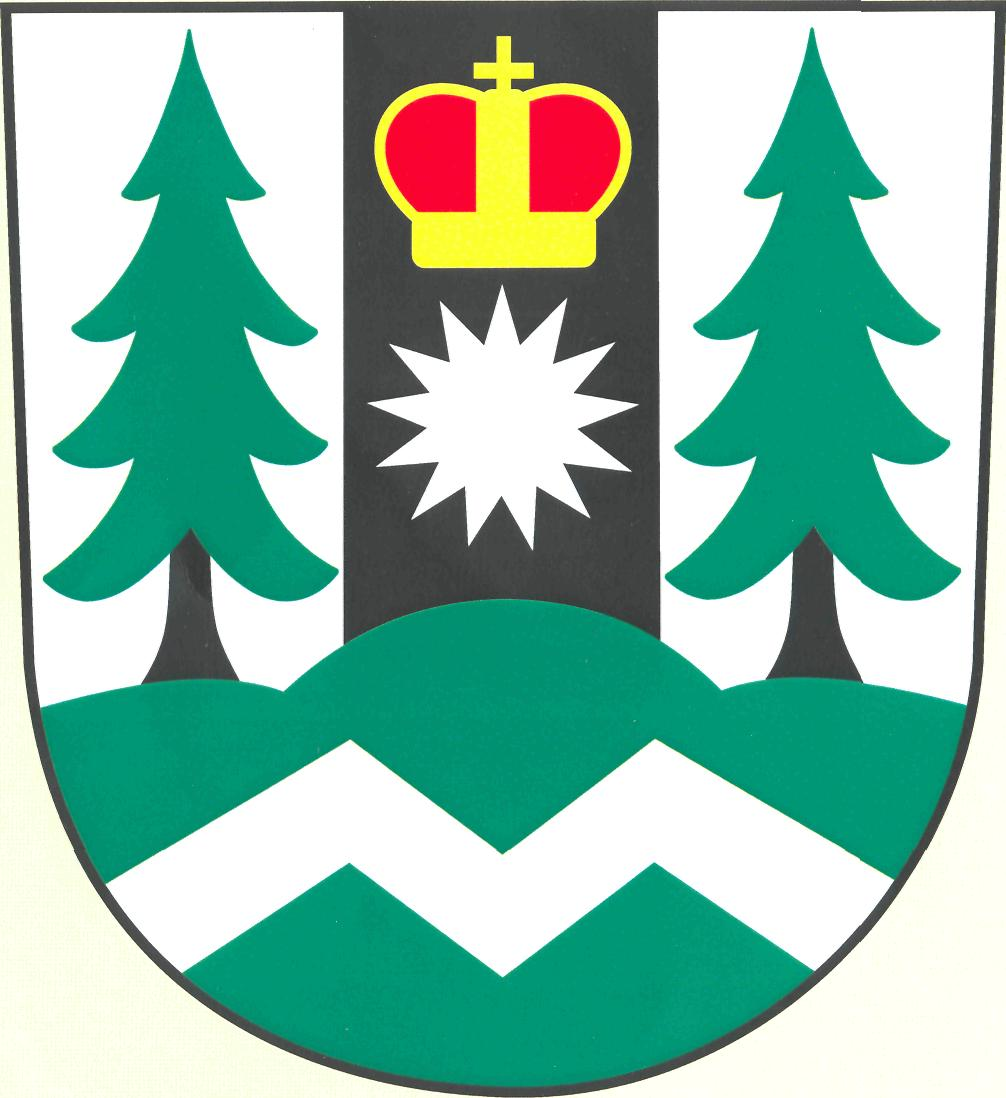
- Flag Coat of arms

- Location in the Czech Republic
- Coordinates: 49°15′59″N 13°18′5″E
- Country: Czech Republic
- Region: Plzeň
- District: Klatovy
- First mentioned: 1338

Area
  - Total: 88.23 km^{2} (34.07 sq mi)
- Elevation: 716 m (2,349 ft)

Population (2026-01-01)
  - Total: 485
  - Density: 5.50/km^{2} (14.2/sq mi)
- Time zone: UTC+1 (CET)
  - Summer (DST): UTC+2 (CEST)
- Postal codes: 339 01, 341 42
- Website: www.cachrov.cz

Čachrov (Czech pronunciation: [ˈtʃaxrof]; German: Tschachrau) is a market town in Klatovy District in the Plzeň Region of the Czech Republic. It has about 500 inhabitants.

== Administrative division ==
Čachrov consists of 13 municipal parts (in brackets population according to the 2021 census):

- Čachrov (168)
- Bradné (18)
- Březí (29)
- Chřepice (1)
- Chvalšovice (20)
- Dobřemilice (11)
- Javorná (122)
- Jesení (39)
- Kunkovice (40)
- Onen Svět (6)
- Předvojovice (5)
- Svinná (8)
- Zahrádka (5)

== Etymology ==
The initial name of the settlement was Cachrov. The name was derived from the personal name Cacher (a Czech variant of the German name Zacher, which was a shortened form of Zacharias). Later the name of the settlement was distorted to Čachrov because people thought it came from the Czech word čachr ('dishonest trade').

== Geography ==
Čachrov is located about 14 kilometres (9 mi) south of Klatovy and 52 km (32 mi) south of Plzeň. The northern part of the large municipal territory, which includes the Čachrov proper, lies in the Bohemian Forest Foothills. The southern part is forested and mountainous and lies in the Bohemian Forest. The highest point is near the top of the Polom mountain at 1,292 m (4,239 ft) above sea level. The territory of Čachrov is rich in streams. The main watercourse is the Ostružná River, which originates here.

The central and western part of the municipal territory is protected as the Šumava Protected Landscape Area; the southern part belongs to the Šumava National Park.

== History ==
The first written mention of Čachrov is from 1338, when the village was promoted to a market town. In the 1380s, Vilém of Čachrov had built here a fortress. His descendants owned Čachrov until 1446. Soon after that year, Čachrov was annexed to the Velhartice estate. In 1541, Čachrov became again a separate estate, owned by various lesser noblemen.

== Demographics ==
Historical population

Year	Pop.	±%
1869	3,647	—
1880	3,877	+6.3%
1890	3,499	−9.7%
1900	3,256	−6.9%
1910	3,357	+3.1%

Year	Pop.	±%
1921	3,322	−1.0%
1930	2,931	−11.8%
1950	995	−66.1%
1961	895	−10.1%
1970	745	−16.8%

Year	Pop.	±%
1980	670	−10.1%
1991	577	−13.9%
2001	538	−6.8%
2011	511	−5.0%
2021	472	−7.6%

Source: Censuses

== Transport ==
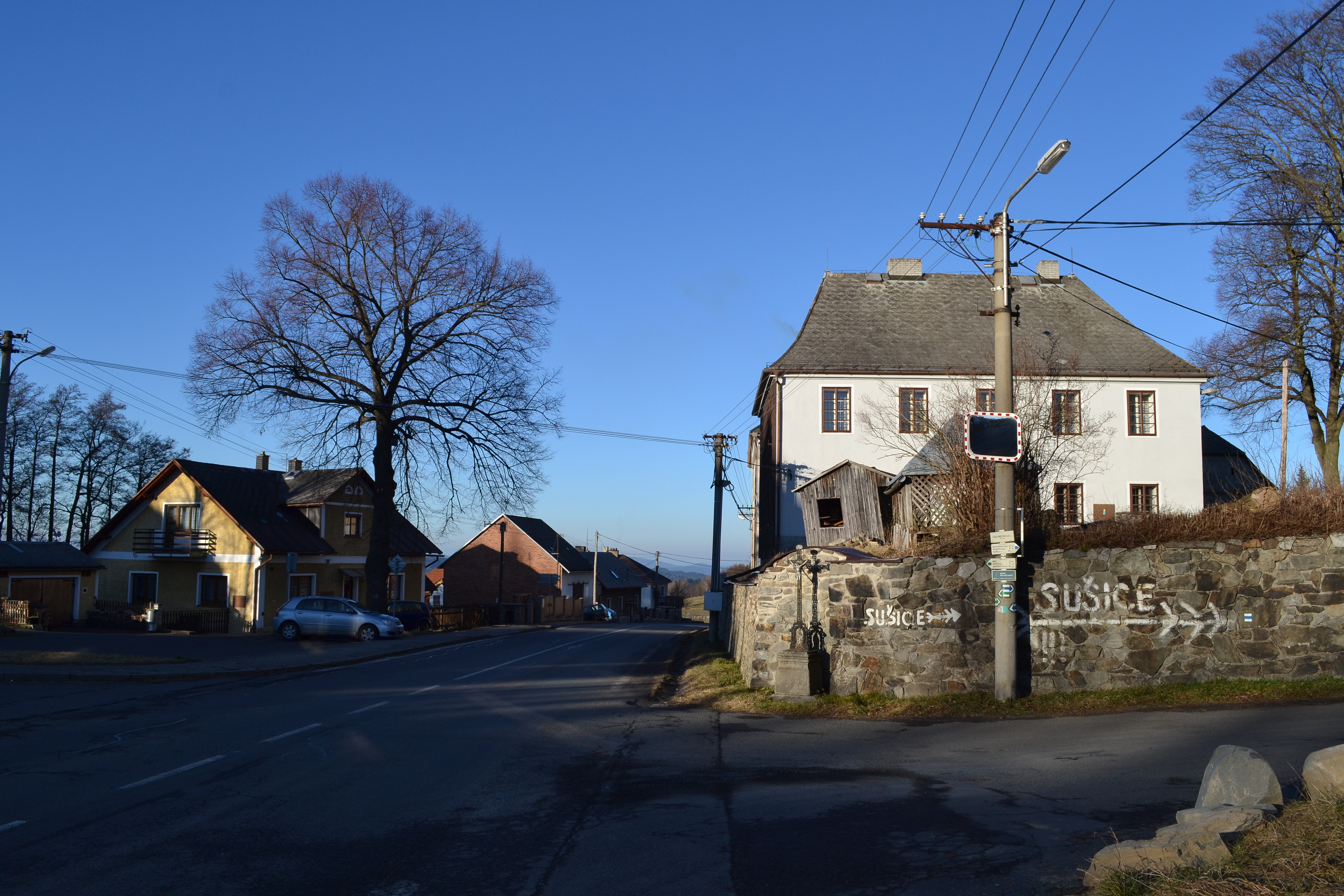
Main road in the centre of Čachrov

The I/27 road (part of the European route E53), which connects Klatovy with the Czech–German border in Železná Ruda, runs through the municipal territory.

== Sights ==
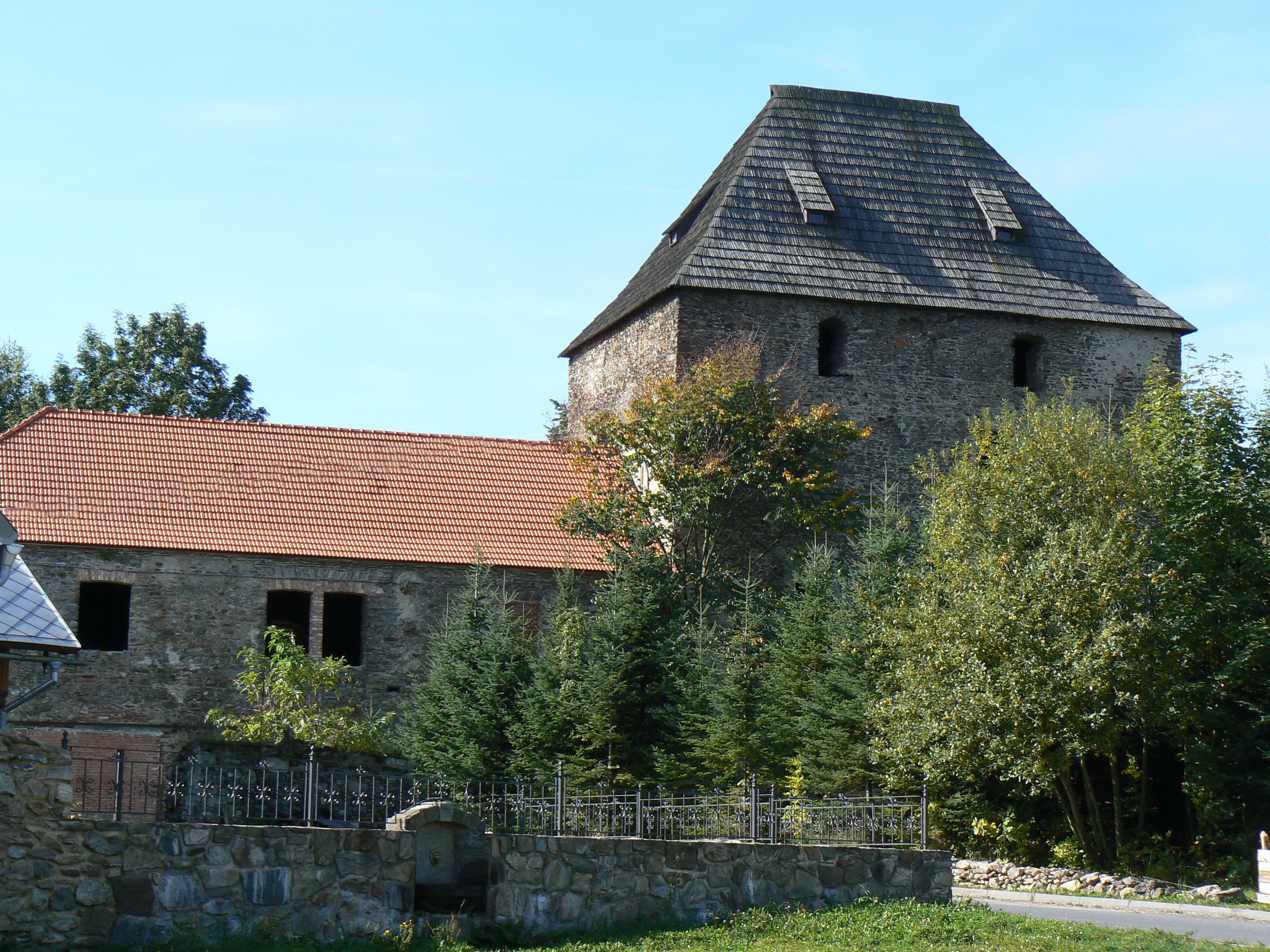
Čachrov Fortress

The main landmark of Čachrov is the Church of Saint Wenceslaus. It was built in the Gothic style in the 14th century, then it was modified in the 18th century. In 1804, the tower was added.

A significant landmark is the original medieval late Gothic fortress. A Renaissance reconstruction took place around 1600 and an early Baroque manor house was attached to the fortress in 1712. Today it is in poor condition and inaccessible.

The Church of Saint Anne is a valuable Baroque building located in Javorná. It was originally a chapel, built in 1698–1701. In 1718–1721, the western part with the two towers was added and it became a church.
