= Hrádek (Klatovy District) =

- Municipality
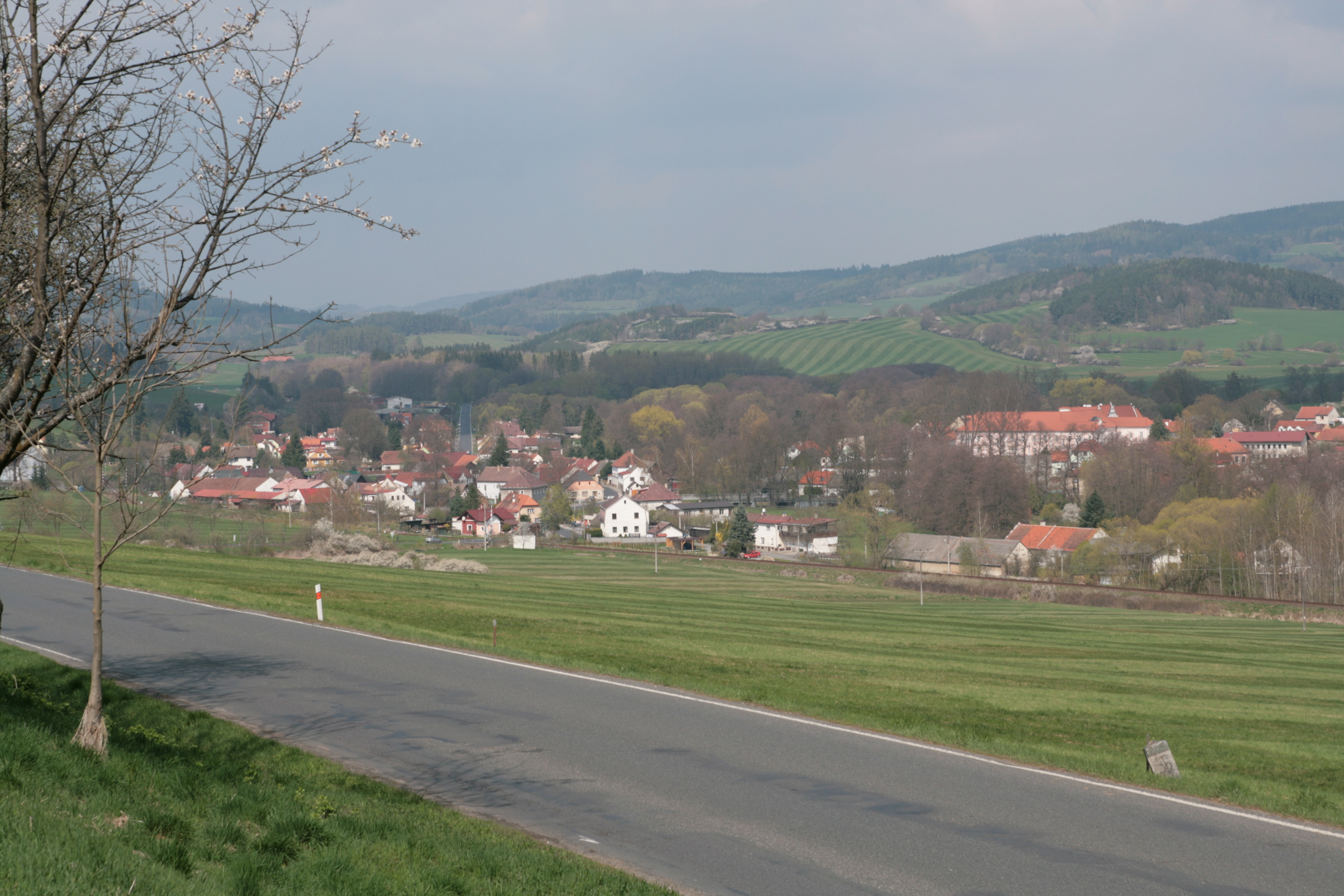
- View from the southeast

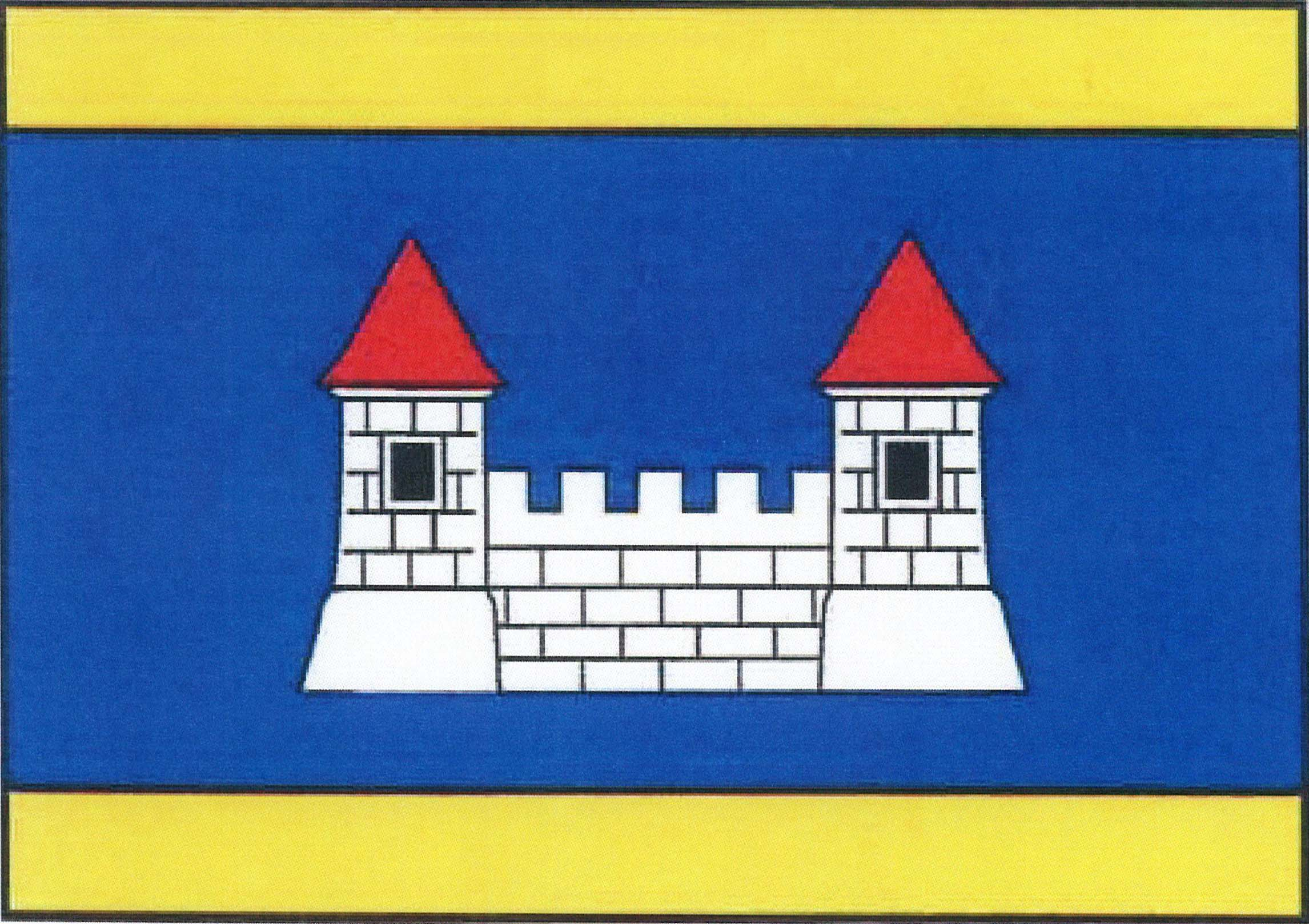
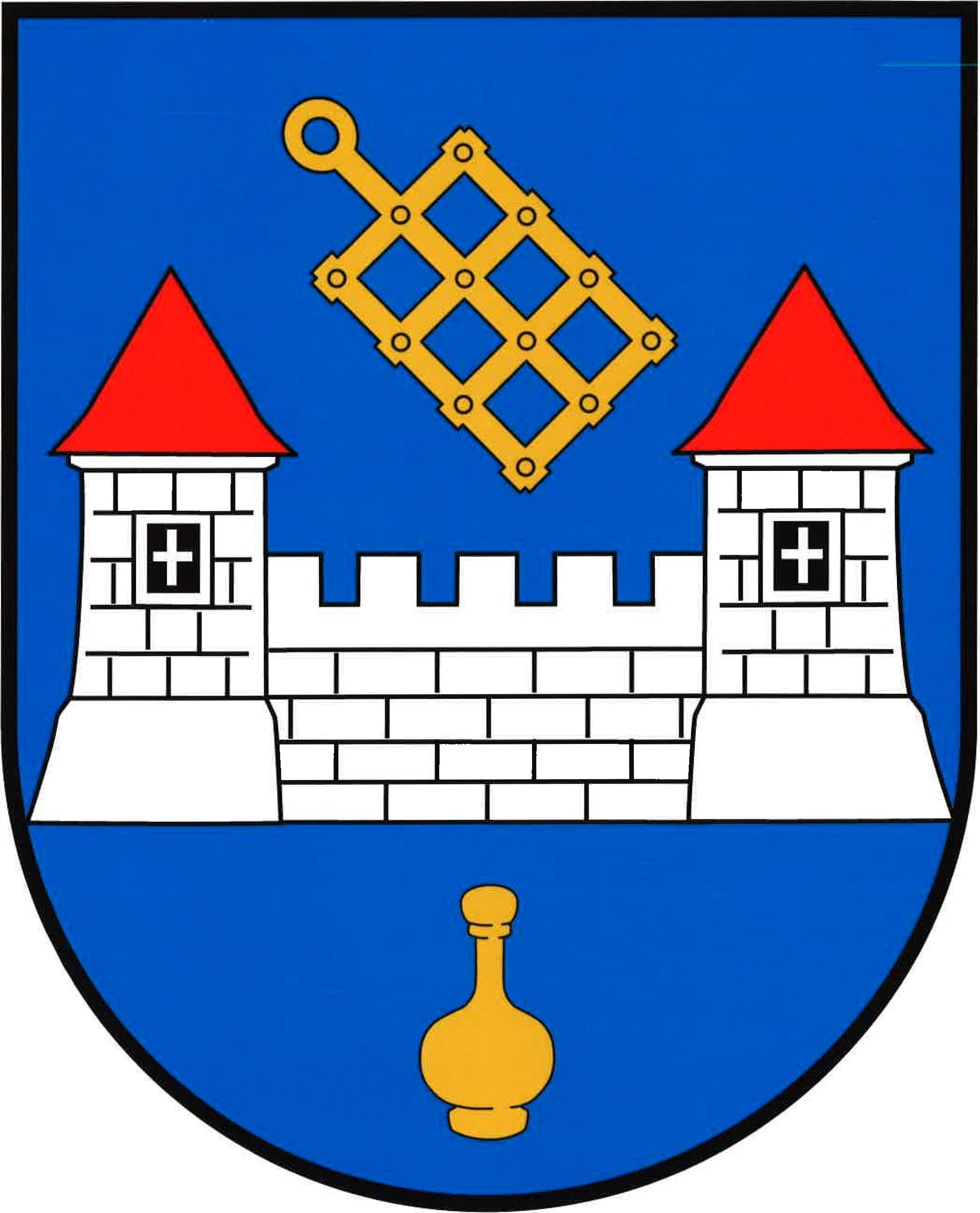
- Flag Coat of arms

- Location in the Czech Republic
- Coordinates: 49°15′49″N 13°29′43″E
- Country: Czech Republic
- Region: Plzeň
- District: Klatovy
- First mentioned: 1298

Area
  - Total: 36.90 km^{2} (14.25 sq mi)
- Elevation: 485 m (1,591 ft)

Population (2026-01-01)
  - Total: 1,328
  - Density: 35.99/km^{2} (93.21/sq mi)
- Time zone: UTC+1 (CET)
  - Summer (DST): UTC+2 (CEST)
- Postal codes: 342 01
- Website: www.hradekususice.cz

Hrádek is a municipality and village in Klatovy District in the Plzeň Region of the Czech Republic. It has about 1,300 inhabitants.

Hrádek lies approximately 22 kilometres (14 mi) south-east of Klatovy, 55 km (34 mi) south of Plzeň, and 114 km (71 mi) south-west of Prague.

== Administrative division ==
Hrádek consists of seven municipal parts (in brackets population according to the 2021 census):

- Hrádek (709)
- Čejkovy (150)
- Čermná (106)
- Kašovice (41)
- Odolenov (43)
- Tedražice (183)
- Zbynice (75)

== Demographics ==
Historical population
Year	Pop.	±%
1869	2,724	—
1880	2,614	−4.0%
1890	2,772	+6.0%
1900	2,624	−5.3%
1910	2,567	−2.2%
1921	2,556	−0.4%
1930	2,468	−3.4%
1950	1,906	−22.8%
1961	1,901	−0.3%
1970	1,678	−11.7%
1980	1,451	−13.5%
1991	1,331	−8.3%
2001	1,327	−0.3%
2011	1,360	+2.5%
2021	1,307	−3.9%
Source: Censuses

== Gallery ==
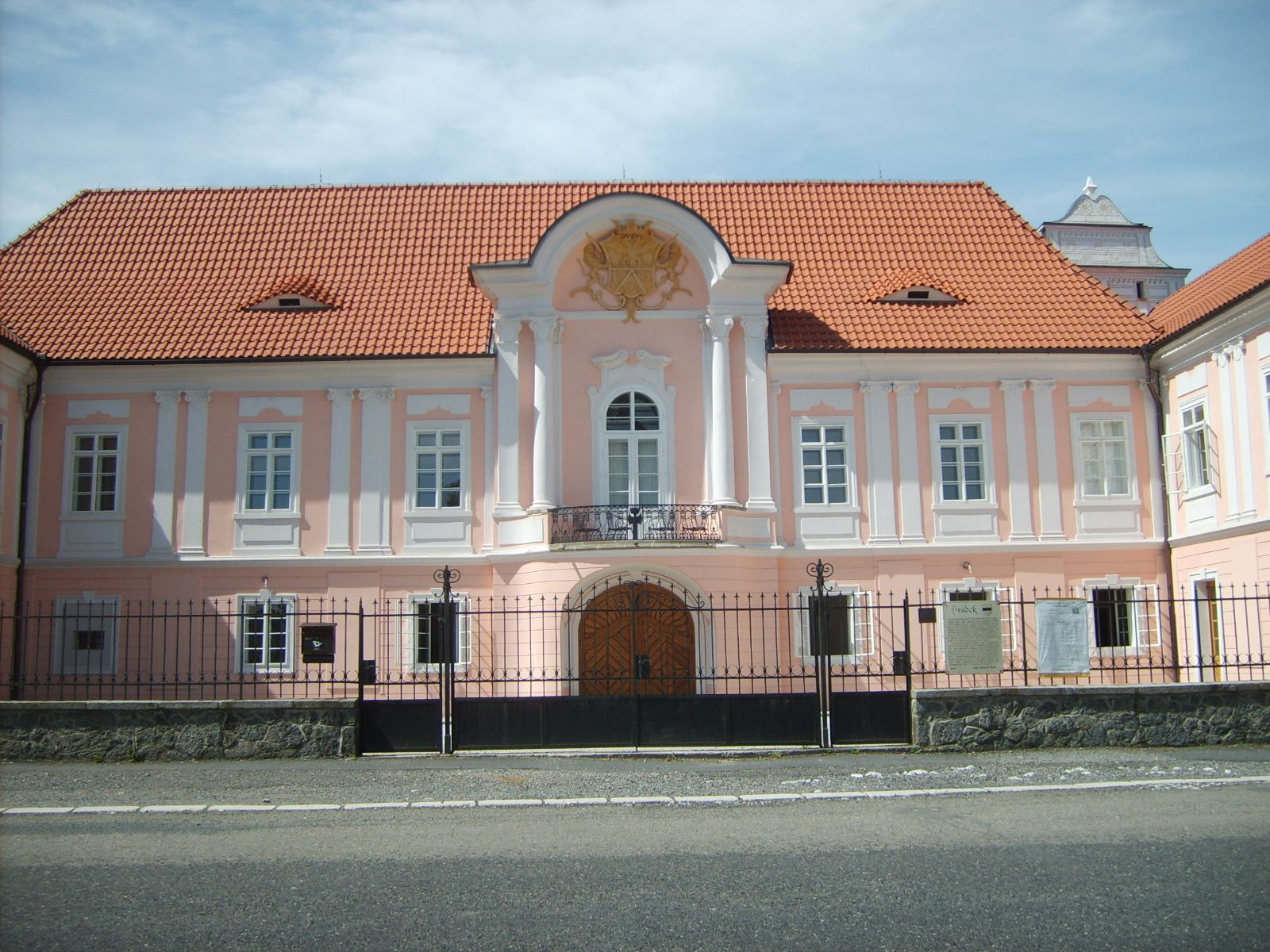
Hrádek Castle

Aerial view of Hrádek Castle

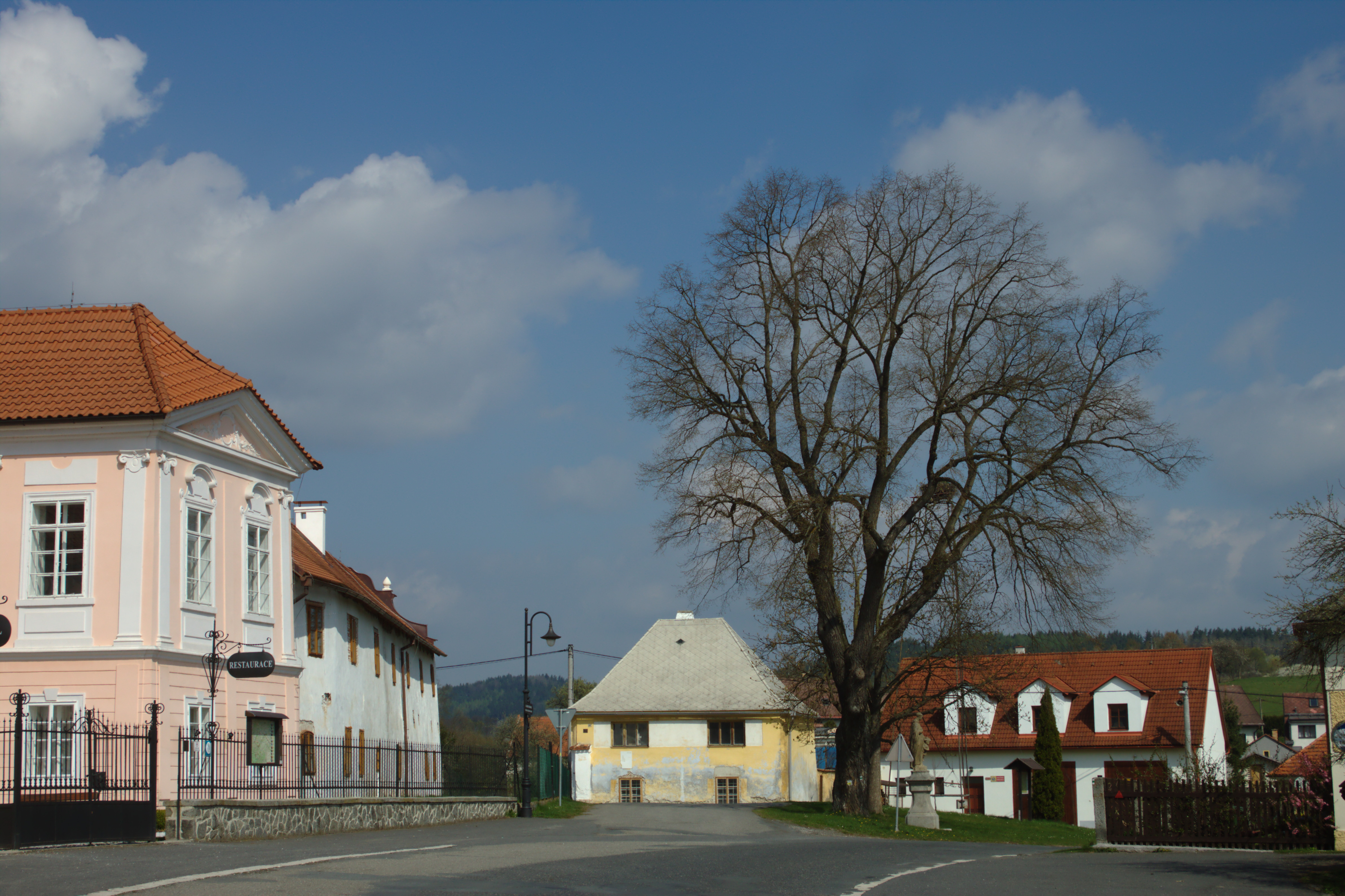
Area in front of the castle

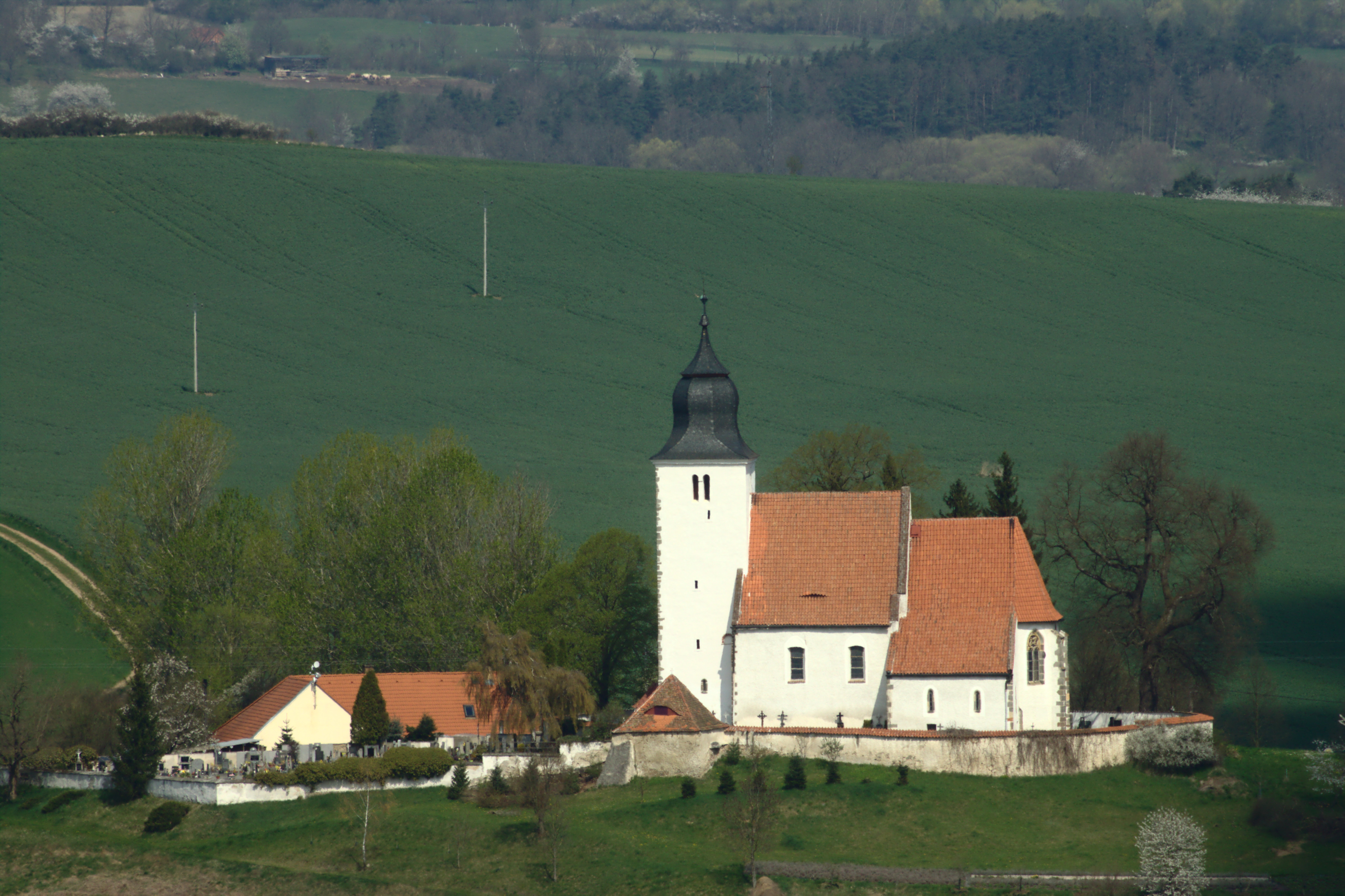
Church of Saint Lawrence
