= Čímice =

- Municipality
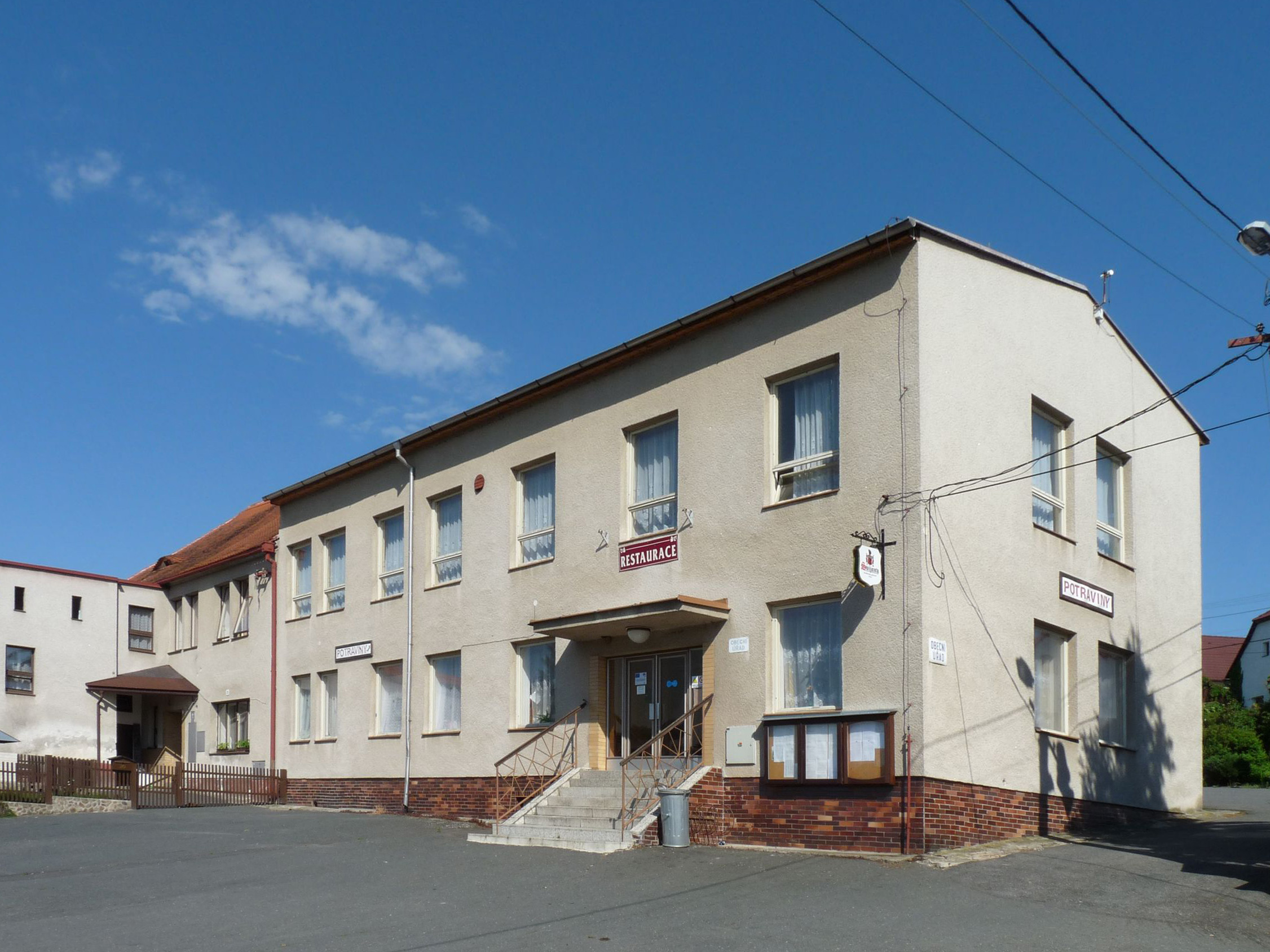
- Municipal office

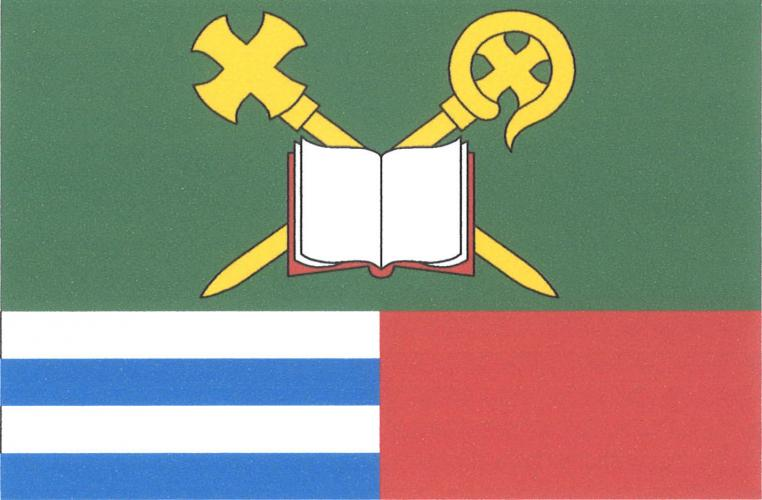
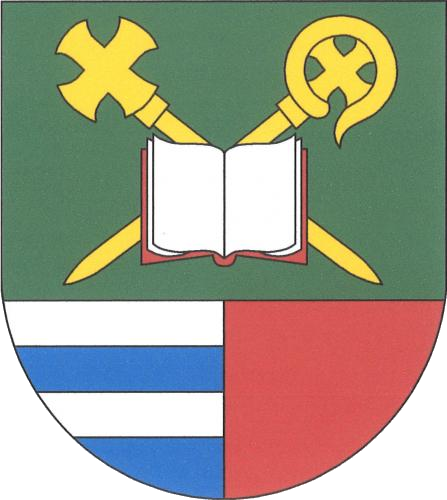
- Flag Coat of arms

- Location in the Czech Republic
- Coordinates: 49°15′13″N 13°36′21″E
- Country: Czech Republic
- Region: Plzeň
- District: Klatovy
- First mentioned: 1543

Area
  - Total: 6.67 km^{2} (2.58 sq mi)
- Elevation: 480 m (1,570 ft)

Population (2026-01-01)
  - Total: 164
  - Density: 24.6/km^{2} (63.7/sq mi)
- Time zone: UTC+1 (CET)
  - Summer (DST): UTC+2 (CEST)
- Postal code: 342 01
- Website: www.cimice.eu

Čímice (German: Zimitz) is a municipality and village in Klatovy District in the Plzeň Region of the Czech Republic. It has about 200 inhabitants.

== Etymology ==
The name was derived from the personal name Čím, meaning "the village of Čím's people".

== Geography ==
Čímice is located about 27 kilometres (17 mi) southeast of Klatovy and 55 km (34 mi) south of Plzeň. It lies in the Bohemian Forest Foothills. The highest point is at 599 m (1,965 ft) above sea level.

== History ==
The first written mention of Čímice is from 1543. For centuries, the village was divided into two parts, which belonged to the estates of Žichovice and Strakonice.

== Demographics ==
Historical population

Year	Pop.	±%
1869	568	—
1880	672	+18.3%
1890	597	−11.2%
1900	595	−0.3%
1910	590	−0.8%

Year	Pop.	±%
1921	590	+0.0%
1930	552	−6.4%
1950	445	−19.4%
1961	374	−16.0%
1970	336	−10.2%

Year	Pop.	±%
1980	230	−31.5%
1991	184	−20.0%
2001	153	−16.8%
2011	177	+15.7%
2021	152	−14.1%

Source: Censuses

== Transport ==
There are no railways or major roads running through the territory.

== Sights ==
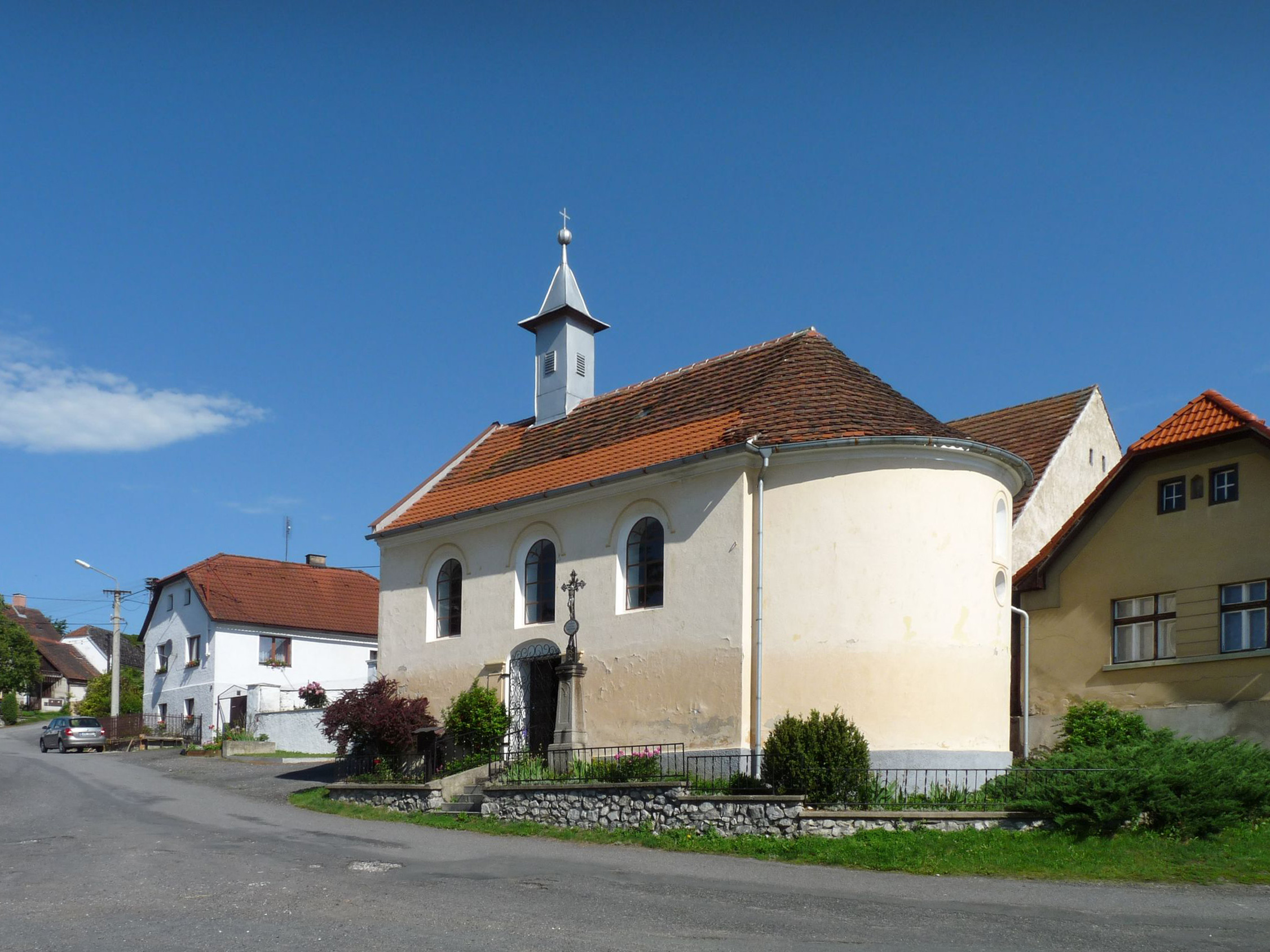
Chapel of Saints Cyril and Methodius

The main landmark of Čímice is the Chapel of Saints Cyril and Methodius. It was built in 1862–1863.
