= Bílenice =

- Village
- Location in the Czech Republic
- Coordinates: 49°14′19″N 13°38′31″E
- Country: Czech Republic
- Elevation: 518 m (1,699 ft)

Population (2011)
  - Total: 77

Bílenice is a village in Žihobce municipality in Klatovy District, Czech Republic.

The village covers an area of 4.81 square kilometres (1.86 sq mi) and has a population of 77 (as of 2011).

== Gallery ==
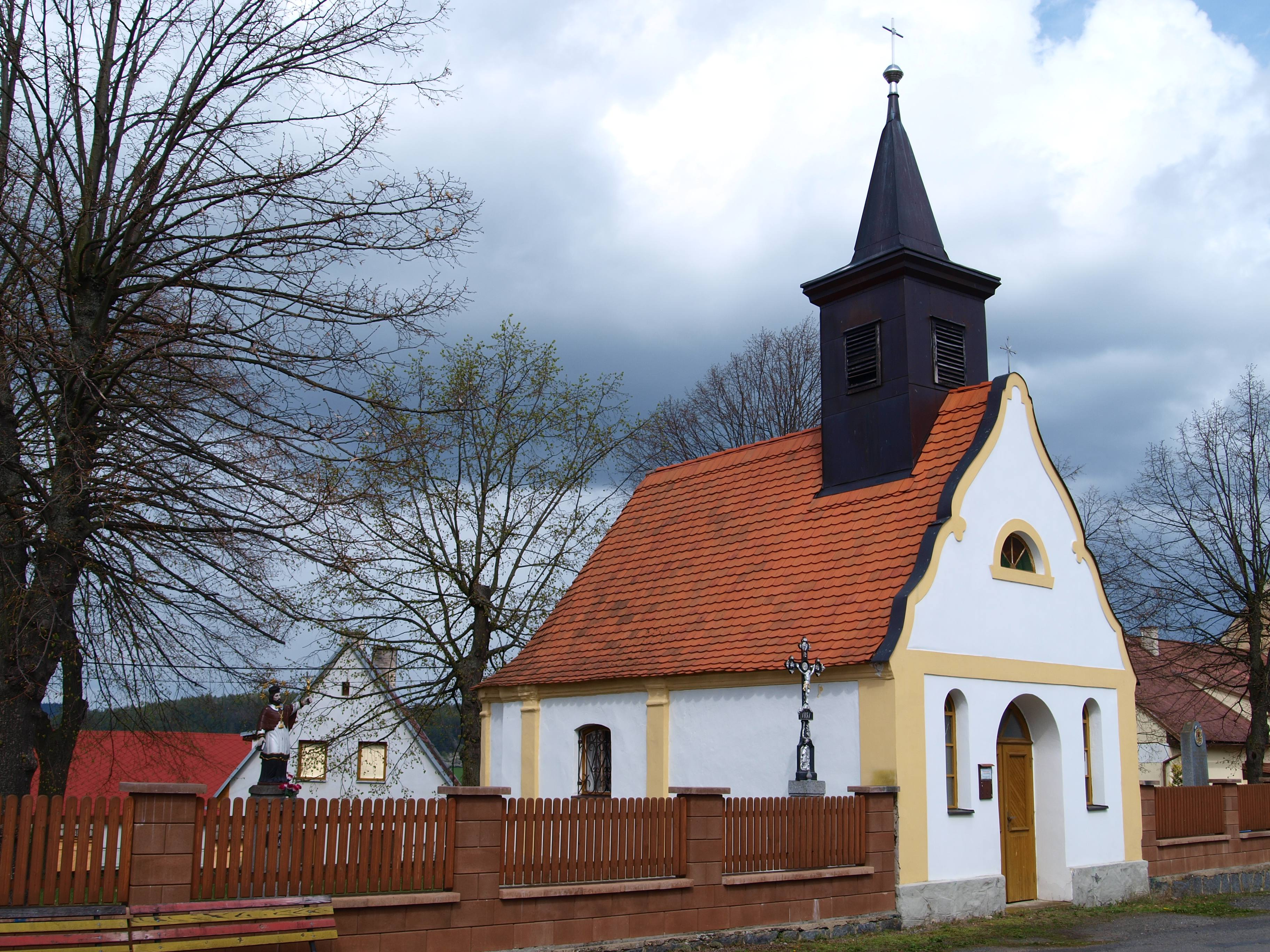
Chapel

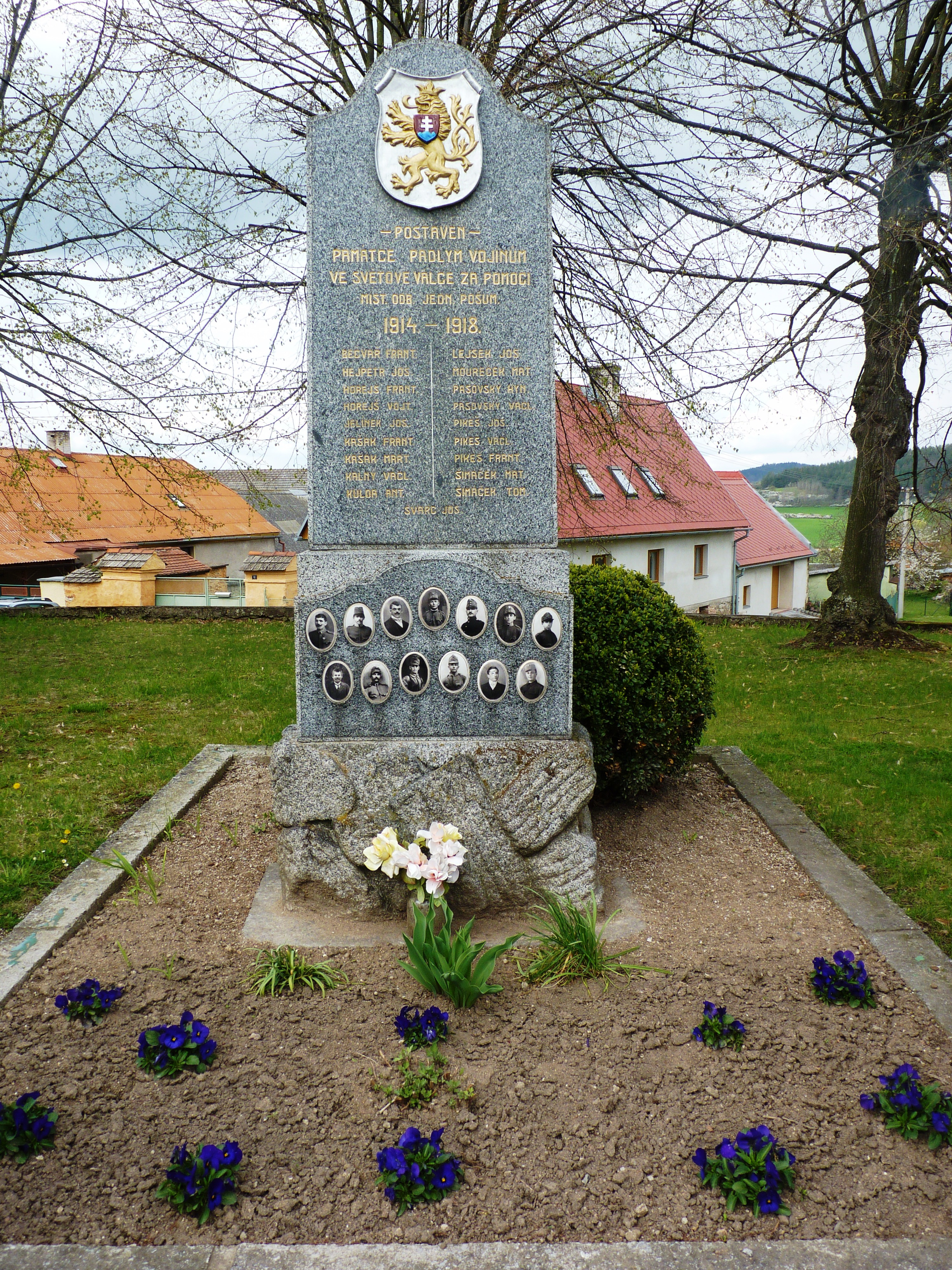
Memorial

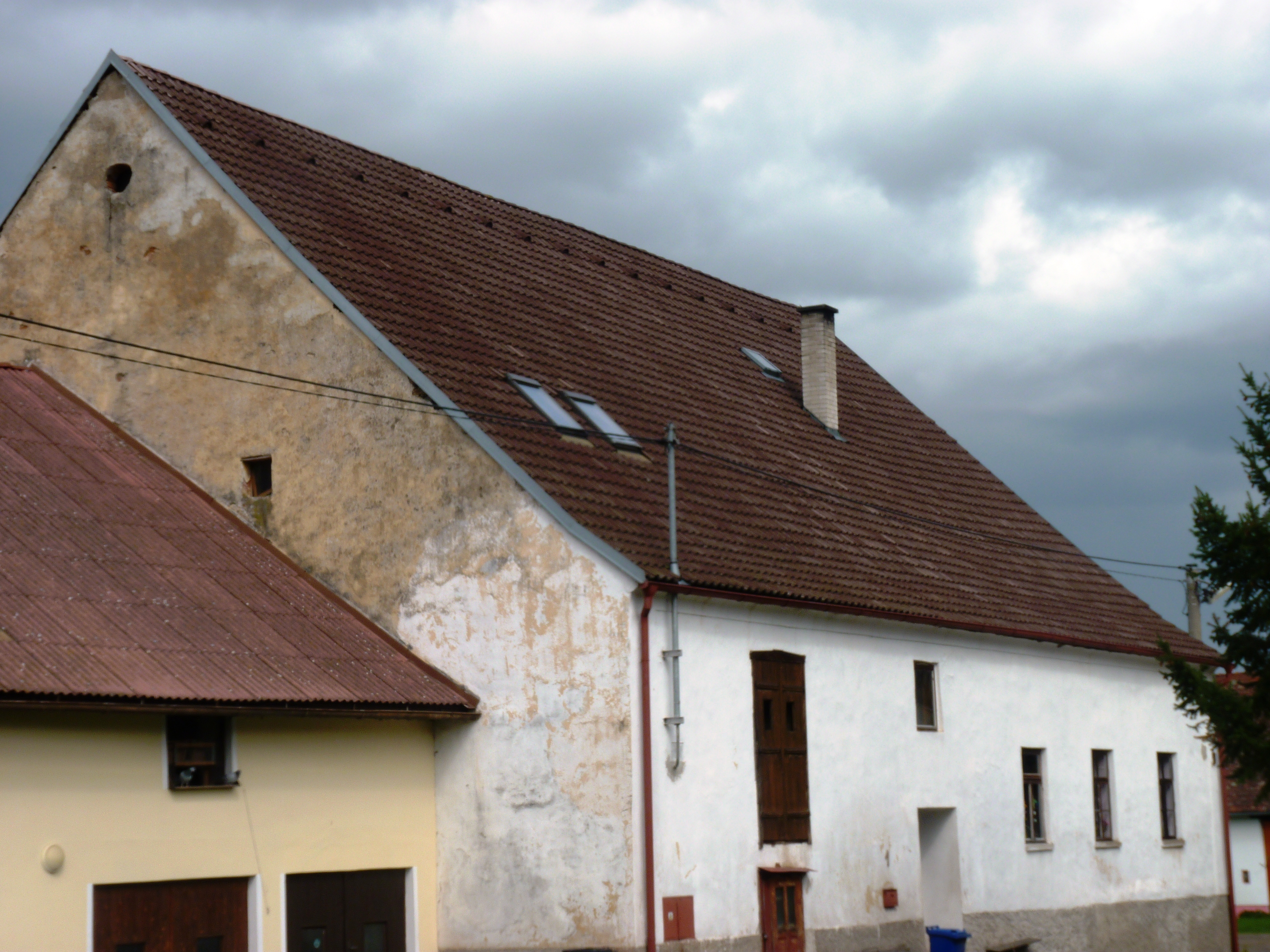
House in detail
