= Žihobce =

- Municipality
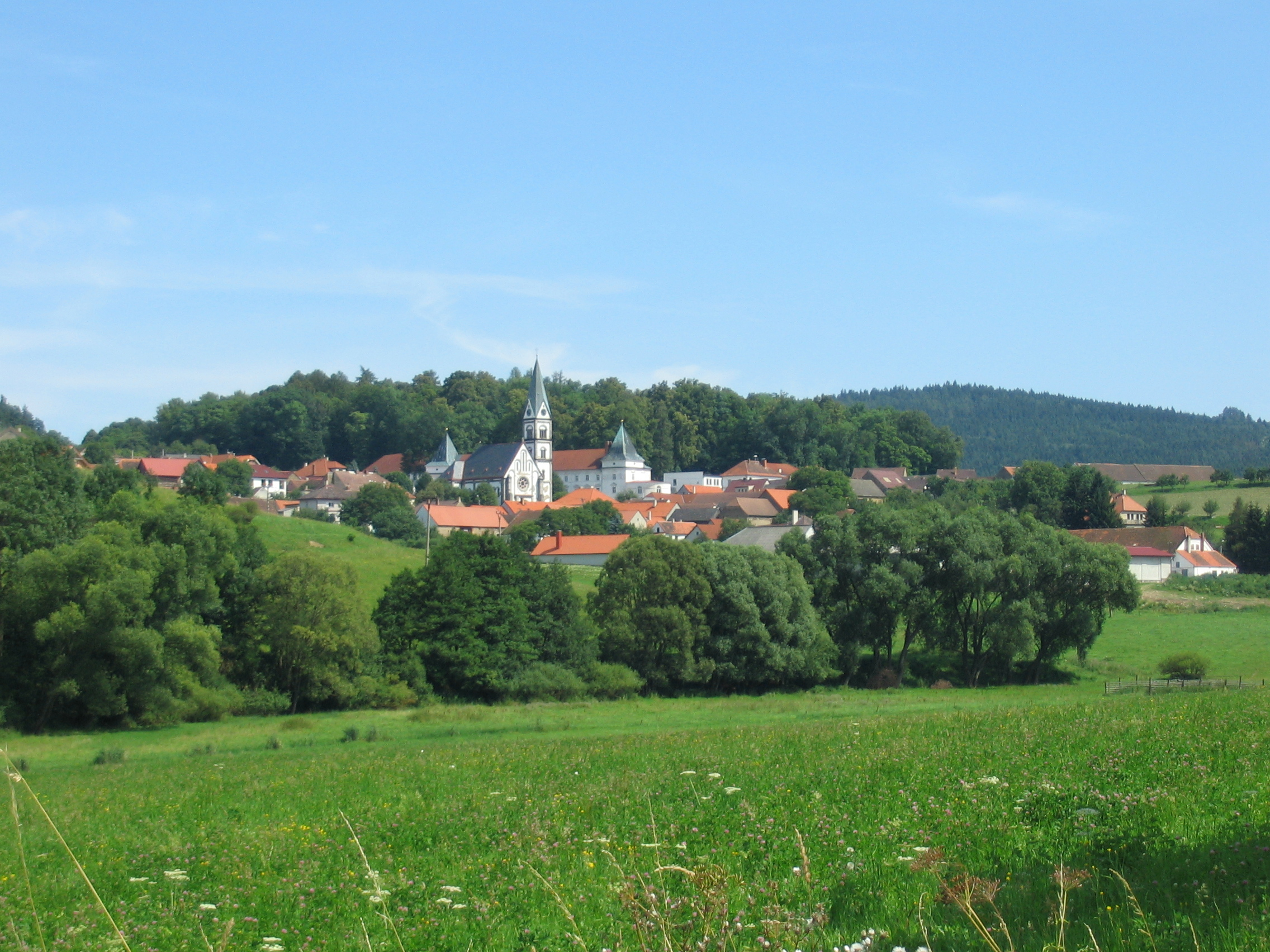
- View from the west

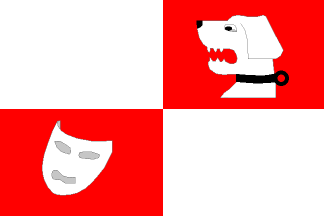
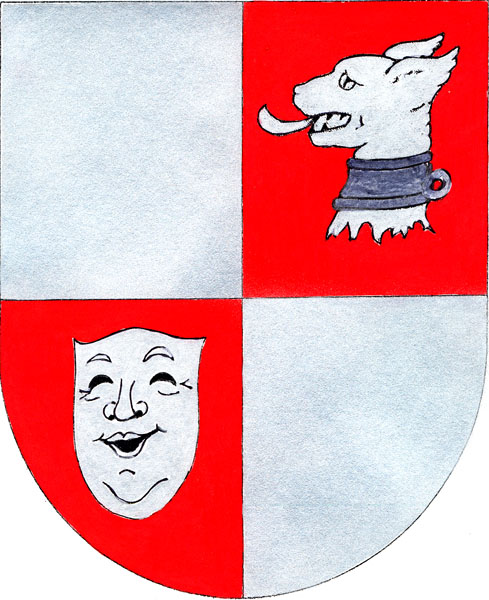
- Flag Coat of arms

- Location in the Czech Republic
- Coordinates: 49°12′56″N 13°37′54″E
- Country: Czech Republic
- Region: Plzeň
- District: Klatovy
- First mentioned: 1045

Area
  - Total: 25.81 km^{2} (9.97 sq mi)
- Elevation: 543 m (1,781 ft)

Population (2026-01-01)
  - Total: 579
  - Density: 22.4/km^{2} (58.1/sq mi)
- Time zone: UTC+1 (CET)
  - Summer (DST): UTC+2 (CEST)
- Postal code: 342 01
- Website: www.zihobce.eu

Žihobce is a municipality and village in Klatovy District in the Plzeň Region of the Czech Republic. It has about 600 inhabitants.

== Administrative division ==
Žihobce consists of six municipal parts (in brackets population according to the 2021 census):

- Žihobce (267)
- Bešetín (11)
- Bílenice (73)
- Kadešice (53)
- Rozsedly (127)
- Šimanov (35)

== Etymology ==
The initial name of the village was Živohybice (written as Sivohybice in the oldest preserved document). The name was distorted to Žihobice (probably due to the similarity with the name of the nearby village of Žichovice) and then to Žihobce. The origin of the name is unclear.

== Geography ==
Žihobce is located about 31 kilometres (19 mi) southeast of Klatovy and 60 km (37 mi) south of Plzeň. It lies in the Bohemian Forest Foothills. The highest point is on the slope of the Sedlo hill at 861 m (2,825 ft) above sea level. The municipal territory is rich in small fishponds.

== History ==
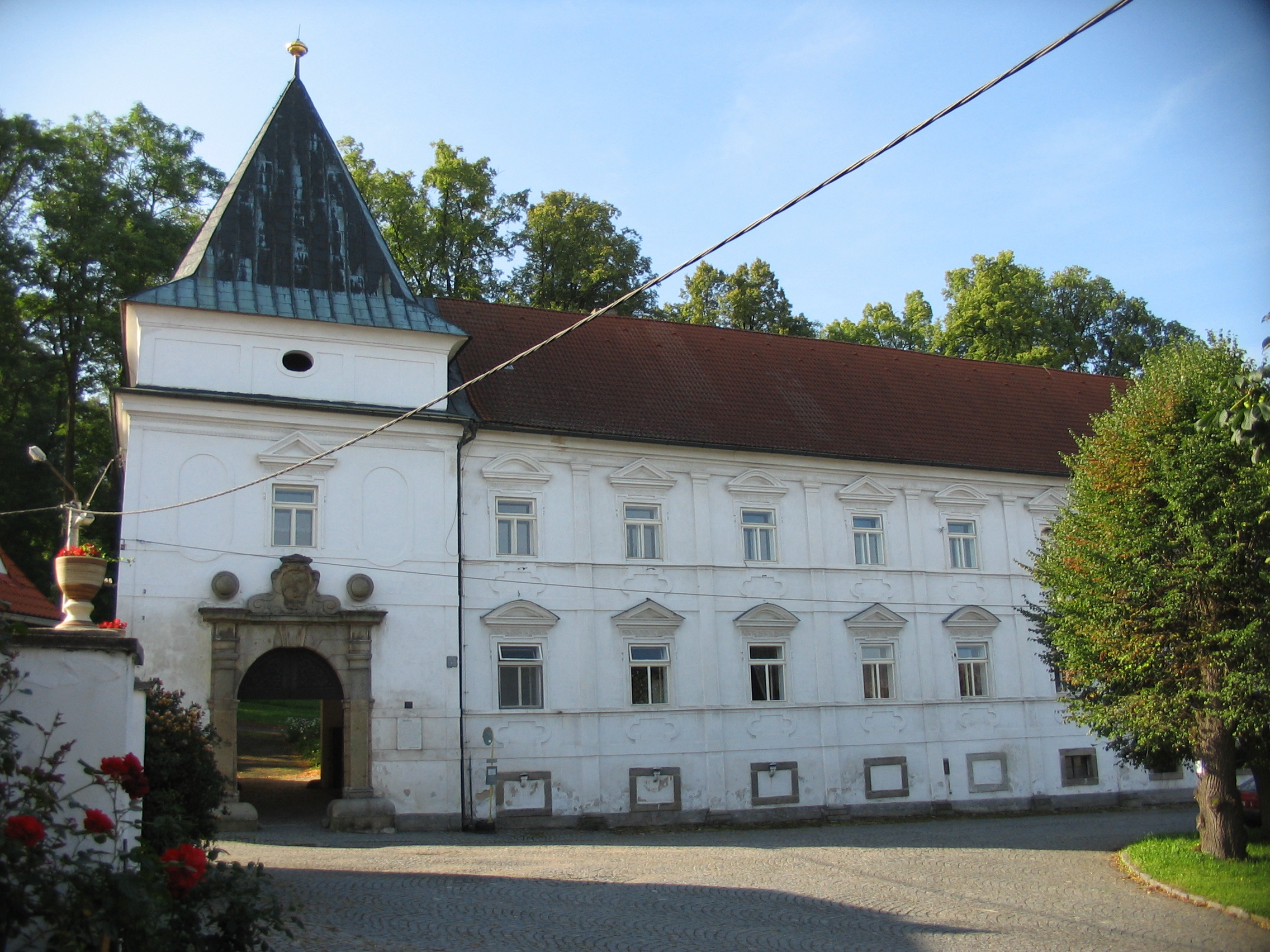
Žihobce Castle

The first written mention of Žihobce is from 1045. In the same year, the village was donated by Duke Bretislav I to the Břevnov Monastery. It is not known how long the monastery owned the village, but in 1356 it already belonged to a family of lesser nobles who called themselves the Lords of Žihobce. They owned Žihobce until the first half of the 16th century, when it was bought by the Rýzmberk family. However, they soon sold it to Jan Šťastný of Říčany.

Jan Šťastný of Říčany owned Žihobce in 1548–1556. In 1556, Žihobce was acquired by the Koc family. They built here a fortress and made Žihobce the centre of a small estate. In 1617, the estate was bought by Jaroslav Pinta Bukovanský of Bukovany, but his properties were confiscated by Emperor Ferdinand II in 1620 as a result of the Battle of White Mountain. Žihobce then often changed hands. Its owners included various former imperial officers and their wives and widows. The most notable of them was Ferdinand Isellin, who chose Žihobce as his residence and had rebuilt the fortress into a castle in 1688.

== Demographics ==
Historical population

Year	Pop.	±%
1869	2,047	—
1880	2,147	+4.9%
1890	2,085	−2.9%
1900	2,034	−2.4%
1910	2,180	+7.2%

Year	Pop.	±%
1921	2,021	−7.3%
1930	1,835	−9.2%
1950	1,325	−27.8%
1961	1,247	−5.9%
1970	1,076	−13.7%

Year	Pop.	±%
1980	903	−16.1%
1991	754	−16.5%
2001	669	−11.3%
2011	603	−9.9%
2021	566	−6.1%

Source: Censuses

== Transport ==
There are no railways or major roads passing through the municipality.

== Sights ==
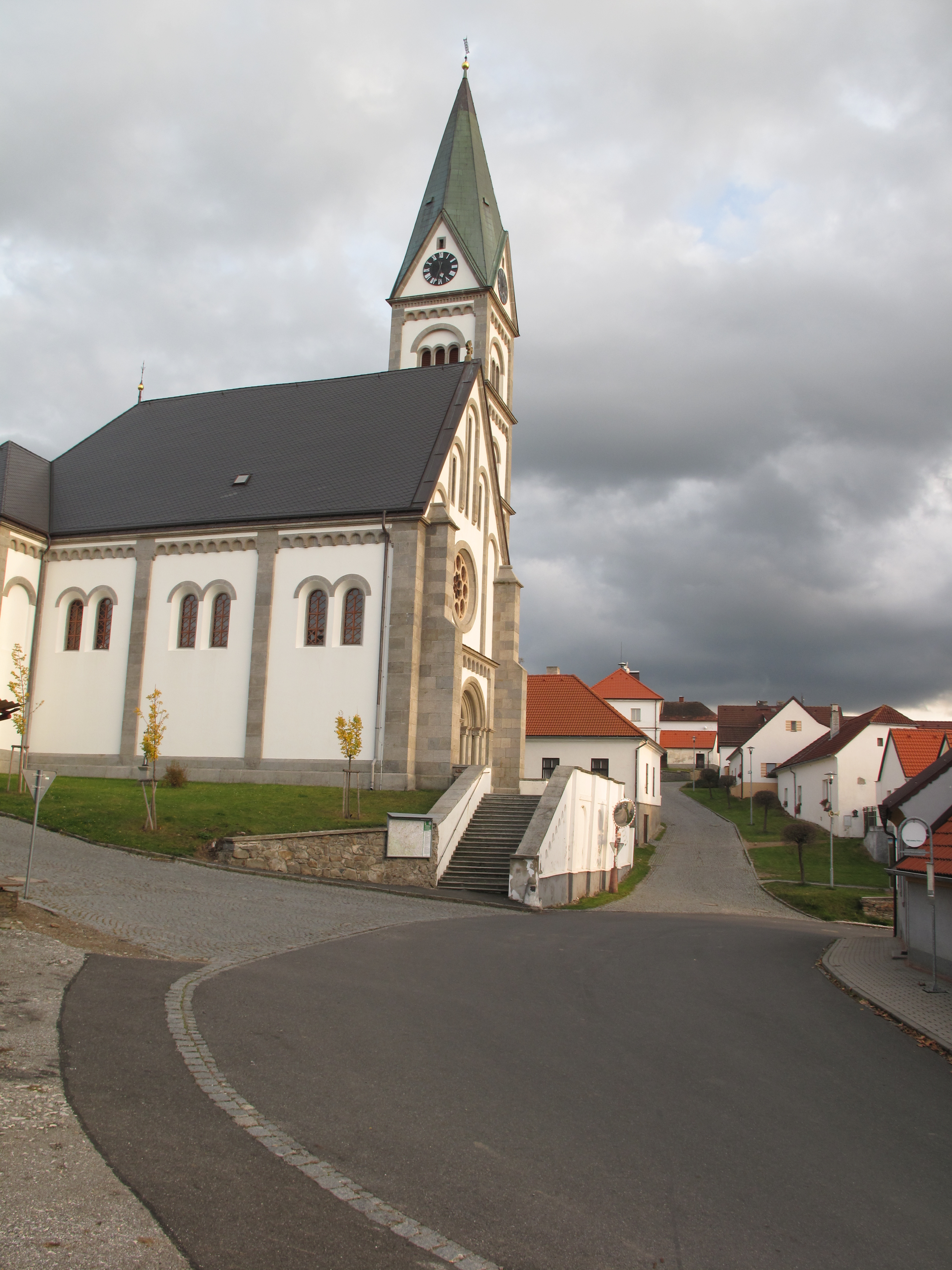
Church of the Transfiguration

Among the main landmarks of Žihobce are the church and the castle. The Church of the Transfiguration is a large Neo-Romanesque building. It was built in 1872–1876 on the site of an older church, which was first documented in 1360.

The Žihobce Castle was originally a Renaissance fortress from the beginning of the 17th century, rebuilt into a Baroque castle in 1688. Next to the castle is a landscape park. Today the castle houses a school and a museum.
