= Žichovice =

- Municipality
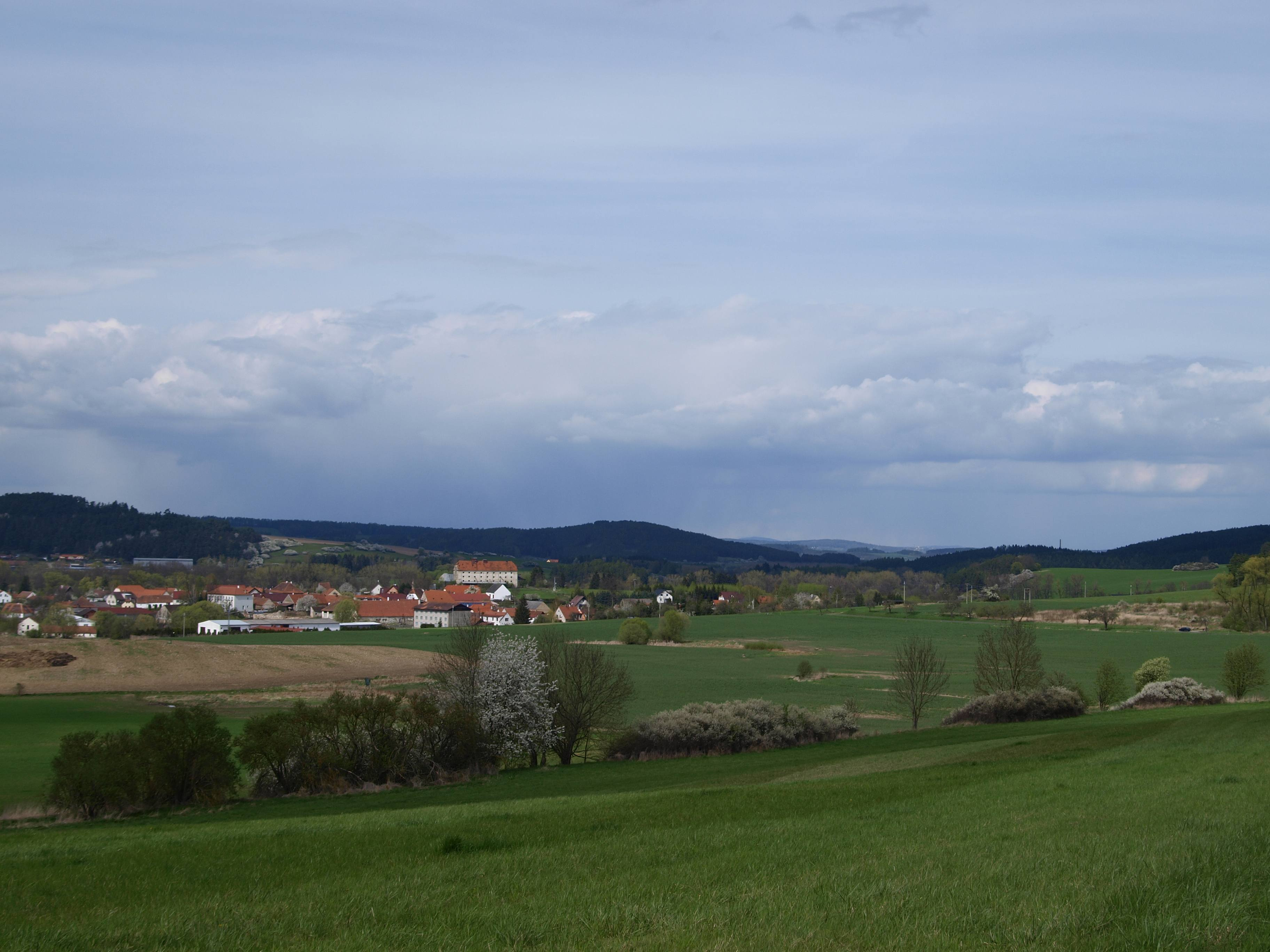
- View from the south

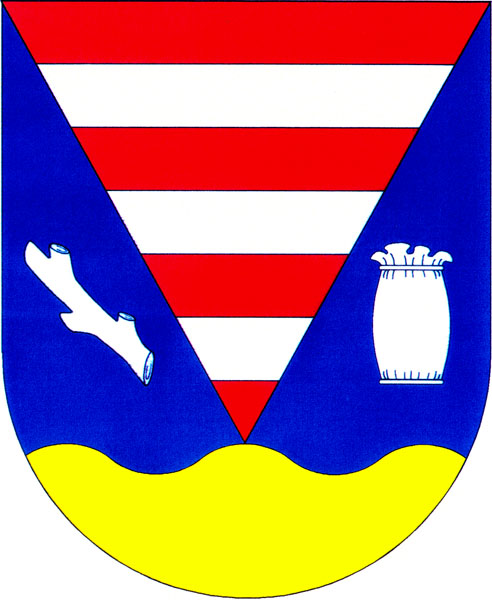
- Flag Coat of arms

- Location in the Czech Republic
- Coordinates: 49°16′2″N 13°37′40″E
- Country: Czech Republic
- Region: Plzeň
- District: Klatovy
- First mentioned: 1045

Area
  - Total: 5.26 km^{2} (2.03 sq mi)
- Elevation: 450 m (1,480 ft)

Population (2026-01-01)
  - Total: 619
  - Density: 118/km^{2} (305/sq mi)
- Time zone: UTC+1 (CET)
  - Summer (DST): UTC+2 (CEST)
- Postal code: 342 01
- Website: www.zichovice.cz

Žichovice is a municipality and village in Klatovy District in the Plzeň Region of the Czech Republic. It has about 600 inhabitants.

Žichovice lies approximately 29 kilometres (18 mi) south-east of Klatovy, 57 km (35 mi) south of Plzeň, and 108 km (67 mi) south-west of Prague.

== Demographics ==
Historical population
Year	Pop.	±%
1869	497	—
1880	468	−5.8%
1890	566	+20.9%
1900	610	+7.8%
1910	573	−6.1%
1921	559	−2.4%
1930	459	−17.9%
1950	487	+6.1%
1961	694	+42.5%
1970	674	−2.9%
1980	695	+3.1%
1991	748	+7.6%
2001	707	−5.5%
2011	648	−8.3%
2021	612	−5.6%
Source: Censuses

== Notable people ==
- Karel Klostermann (1848–1923), writer; lived here as a child
