= Nezdřev =

- Municipality
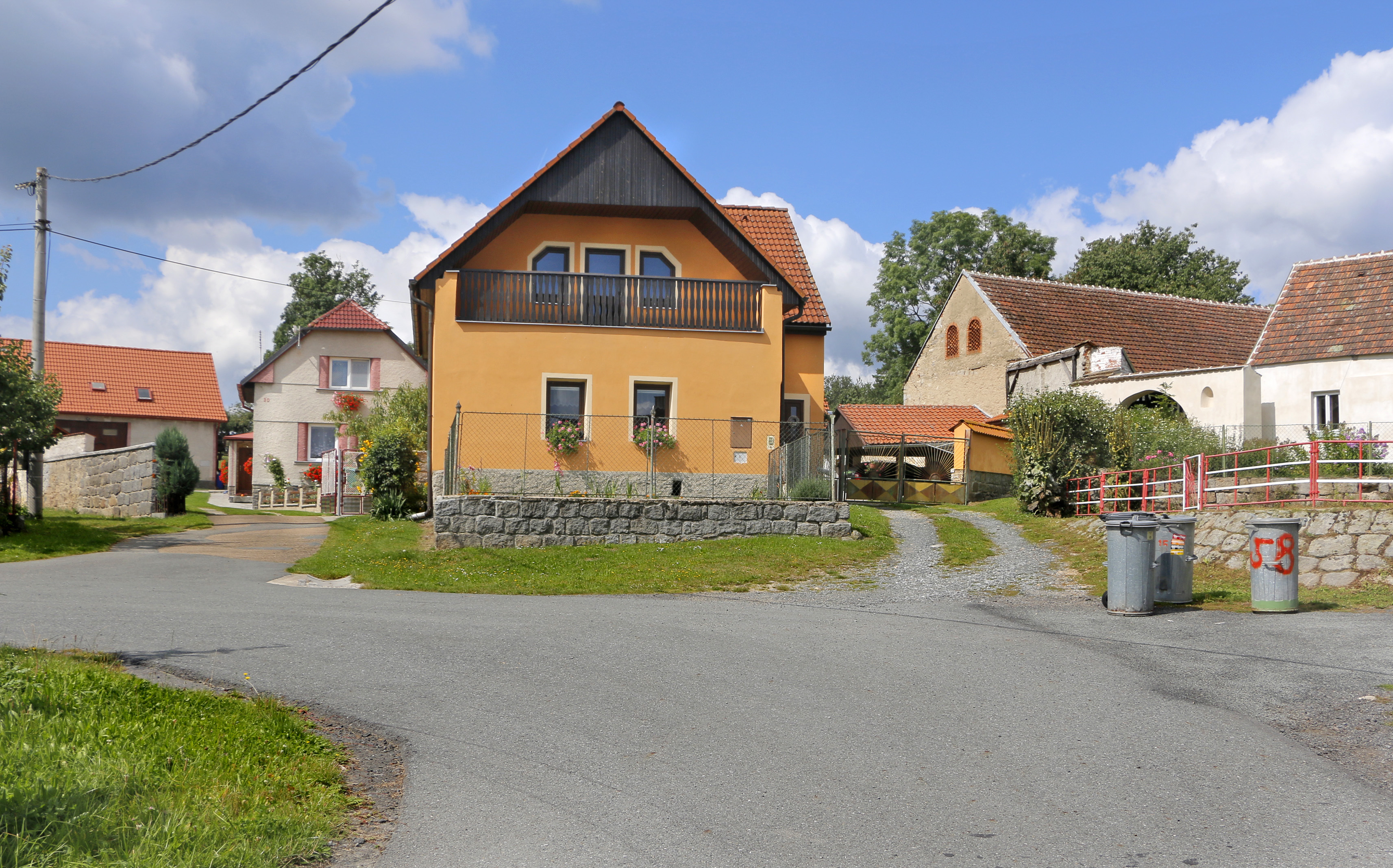
- Upper part of Nezdřev

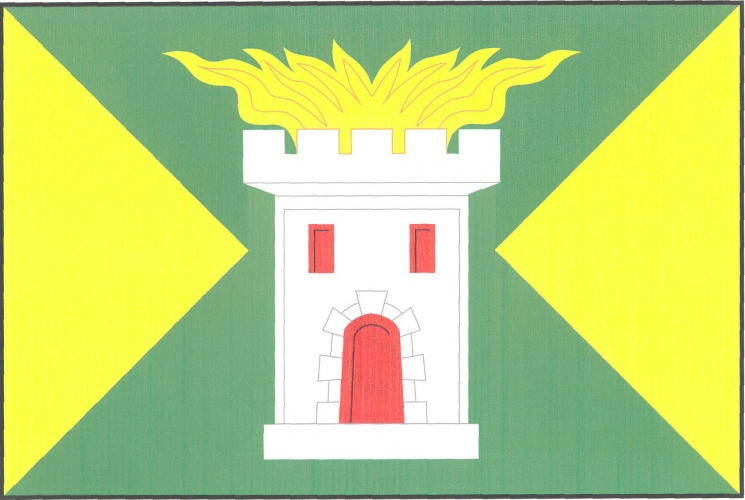
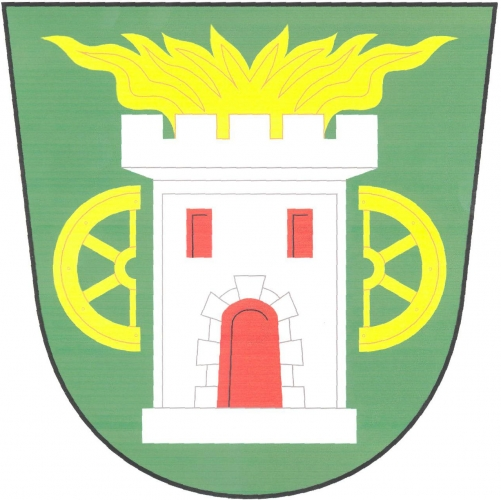
- Flag Coat of arms

- Location in the Czech Republic
- Coordinates: 49°25′36″N 13°43′41″E
- Country: Czech Republic
- Region: Plzeň
- District: Plzeň-South
- First mentioned: 1412

Area
  - Total: 3.13 km^{2} (1.21 sq mi)
- Elevation: 528 m (1,732 ft)

Population (2026-01-01)
  - Total: 103
  - Density: 32.9/km^{2} (85.2/sq mi)
- Time zone: UTC+1 (CET)
  - Summer (DST): UTC+2 (CEST)
- Postal code: 335 44
- Website: www.obecnezdrev.cz

Nezdřev is a municipality and village in Plzeň-South District in the Plzeň Region of the Czech Republic. It has about 100 inhabitants.

Nezdřev lies approximately 44 kilometres (27 mi) south-east of Plzeň and 89 km (55 mi) south-west of Prague.

== Demographics ==
Historical population
Year	Pop.	±%
1869	290	—
1880	307	+5.9%
1890	288	−6.2%
1900	231	−19.8%
1910	246	+6.5%
1921	249	+1.2%
1930	226	−9.2%
1950	170	−24.8%
1961	172	+1.2%
1970	134	−22.1%
1980	143	+6.7%
1991	122	−14.7%
2001	116	−4.9%
2011	115	−0.9%
2021	96	−16.5%
Source: Censuses
