= Radkovice =

- Municipality
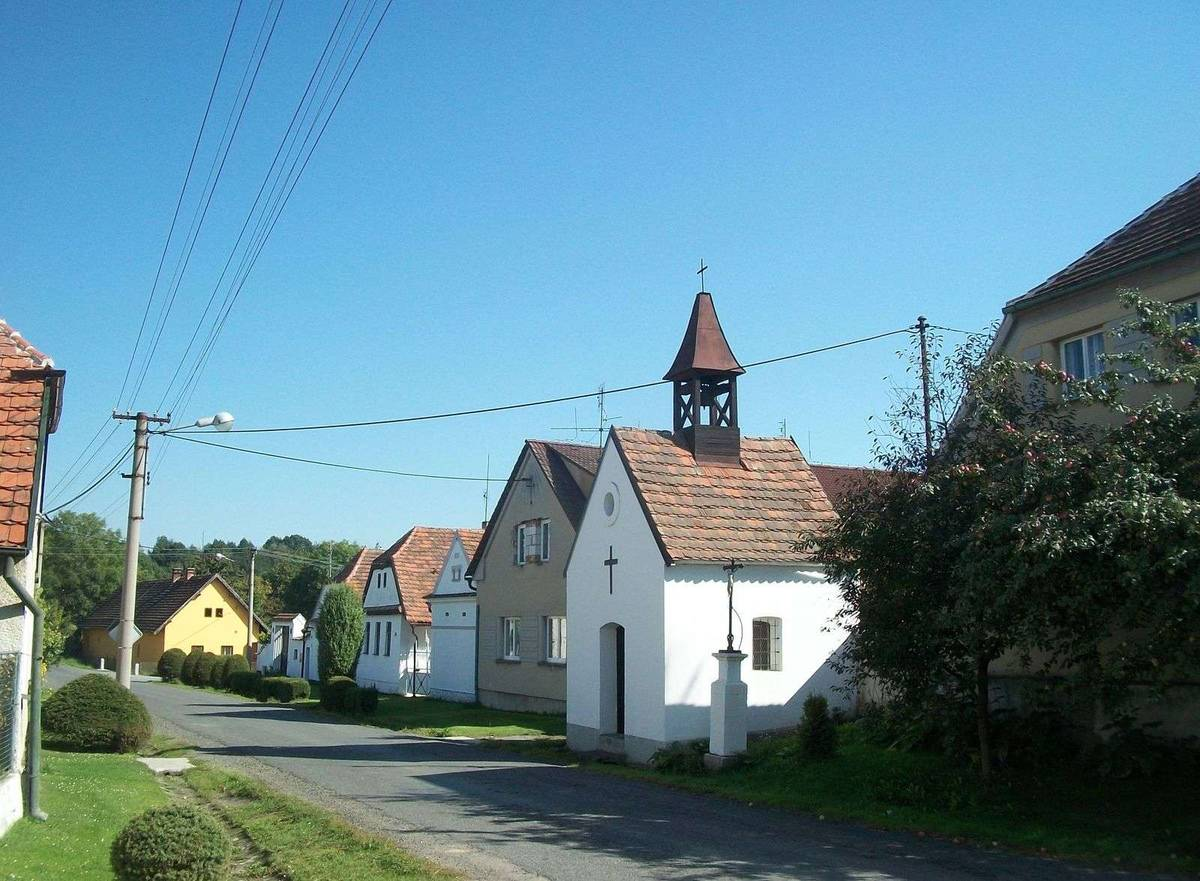
- Chapel of Saint Anne

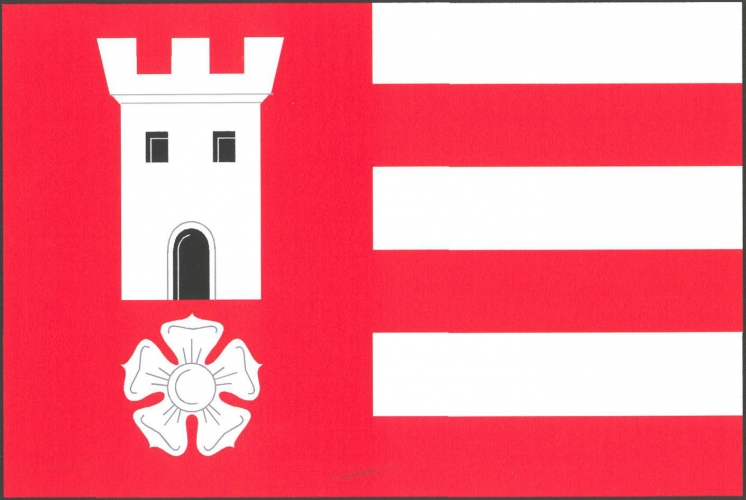
- Flag Coat of arms

- Location in the Czech Republic
- Coordinates: 49°32′53″N 13°22′5″E
- Country: Czech Republic
- Region: Plzeň
- District: Plzeň-South
- First mentioned: 1389

Area
  - Total: 3.32 km^{2} (1.28 sq mi)
- Elevation: 387 m (1,270 ft)

Population (2026-01-01)
  - Total: 113
  - Density: 34.0/km^{2} (88.2/sq mi)
- Time zone: UTC+1 (CET)
  - Summer (DST): UTC+2 (CEST)
- Postal code: 334 01
- Website: www.radkovice.cz

Radkovice is a municipality and village in Plzeň-South District in the Plzeň Region of the Czech Republic. It has about 100 inhabitants.

Radkovice lies approximately 22 kilometres (14 mi) south of Plzeň and 97 km (60 mi) south-west of Prague.

== Demographics ==
Historical population
Year	Pop.	±%
1869	268	—
1880	267	−0.4%
1890	241	−9.7%
1900	249	+3.3%
1910	274	+10.0%
1921	270	−1.5%
1930	263	−2.6%
1950	195	−25.9%
1961	190	−2.6%
1970	161	−15.3%
1980	144	−10.6%
1991	125	−13.2%
2001	91	−27.2%
2011	120	+31.9%
2021	91	−24.2%
Source: Censuses
