= Otěšice =

- Municipality
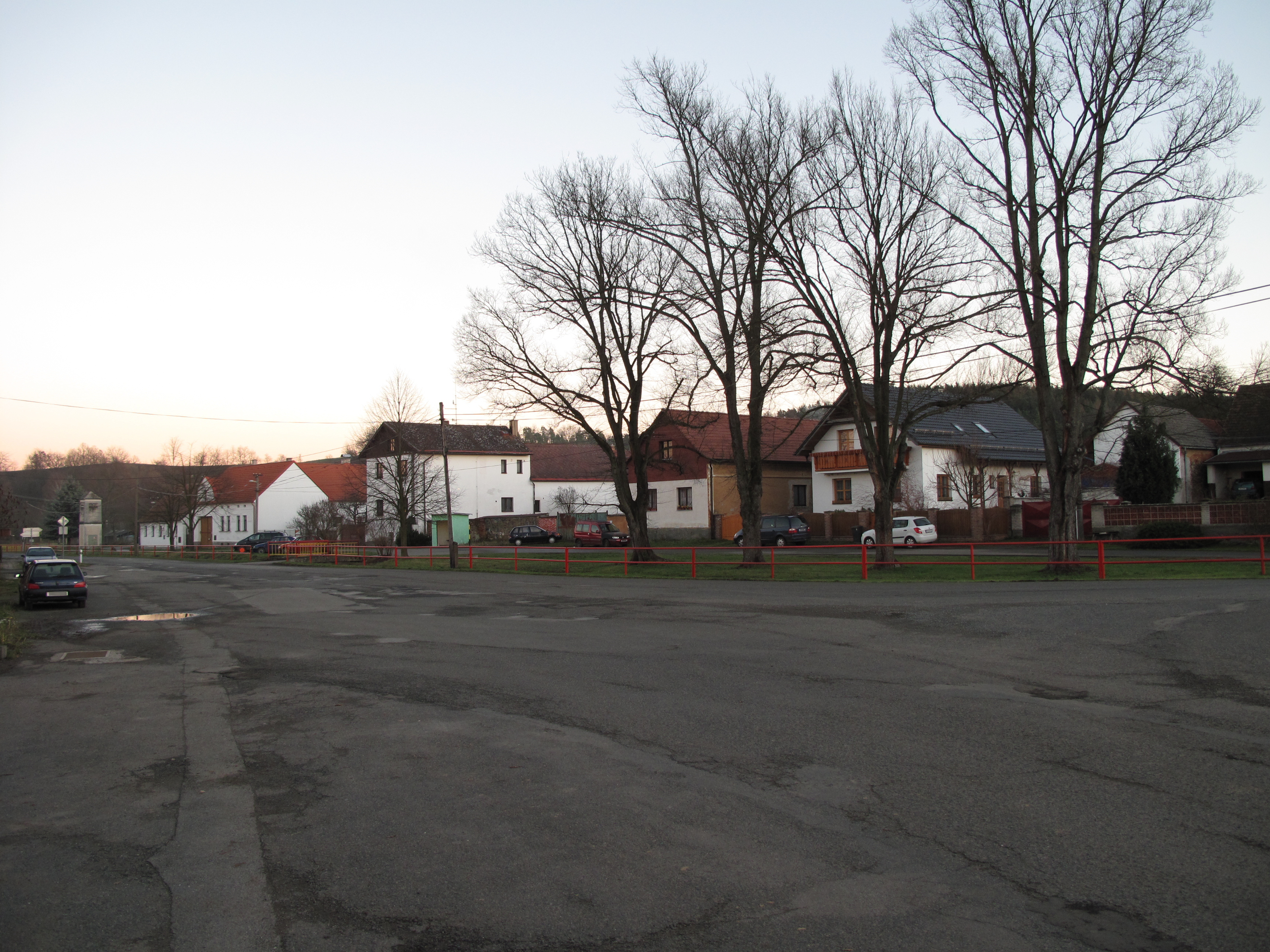
- Centre of Otěšice

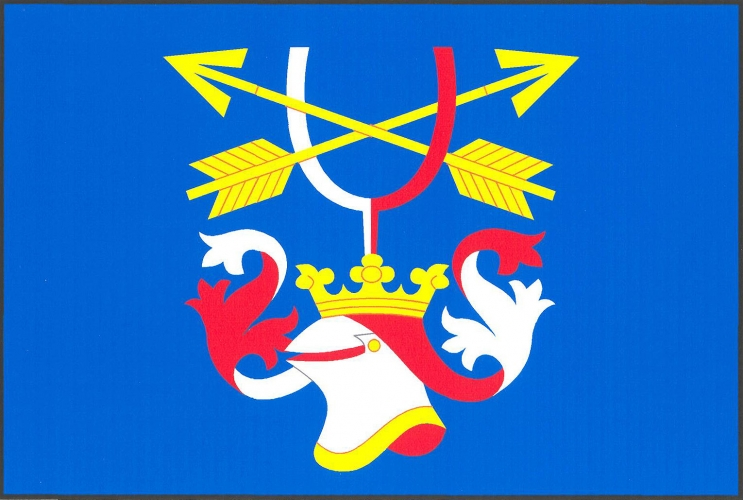
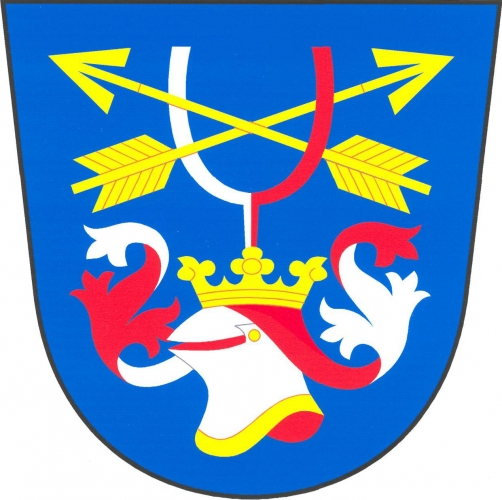
- Flag Coat of arms

- Location in the Czech Republic
- Coordinates: 49°32′29″N 13°13′13″E
- Country: Czech Republic
- Region: Plzeň
- District: Plzeň-South
- First mentioned: 1227

Area
  - Total: 5.57 km^{2} (2.15 sq mi)
- Elevation: 396 m (1,299 ft)

Population (2026-01-01)
  - Total: 149
  - Density: 26.8/km^{2} (69.3/sq mi)
- Time zone: UTC+1 (CET)
  - Summer (DST): UTC+2 (CEST)
- Postal code: 334 01
- Website: www.otesice.cz

Otěšice is a municipality and village in Plzeň-South District in the Plzeň Region of the Czech Republic. It has about 100 inhabitants.

Otěšice lies approximately 26 kilometres (16 mi) south-west of Plzeň and 106 km (66 mi) south-west of Prague.

== Demographics ==
Historical population
Year	Pop.	±%
1869	392	—
1880	395	+0.8%
1890	393	−0.5%
1900	433	+10.2%
1910	459	+6.0%
1921	445	−3.1%
1930	435	−2.2%
1950	326	−25.1%
1961	279	−14.4%
1970	230	−17.6%
1980	201	−12.6%
1991	162	−19.4%
2001	156	−3.7%
2011	148	−5.1%
2021	152	+2.7%
Source: Censuses
