= Drahkov =

- Municipality
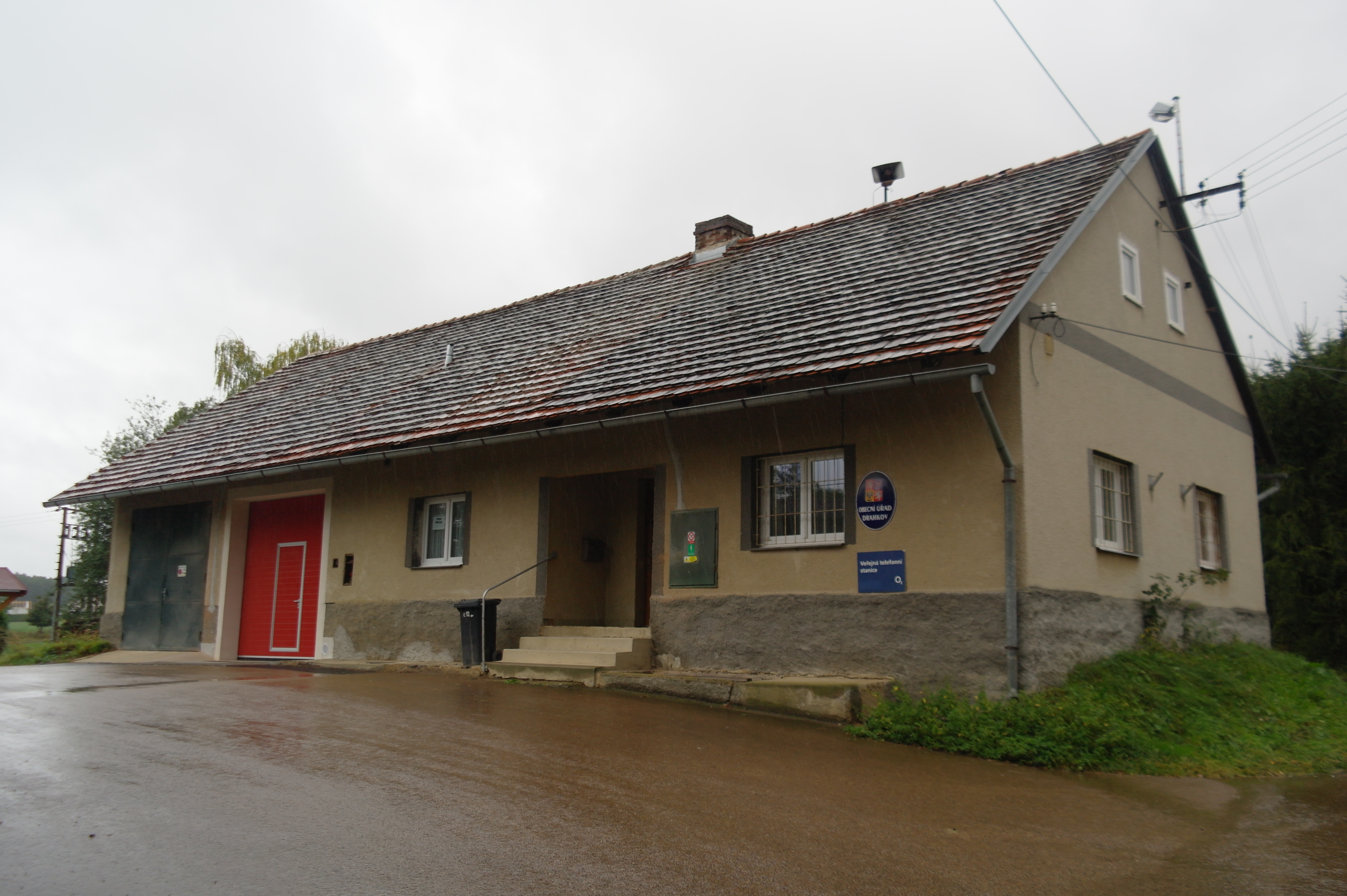
- Municipal office

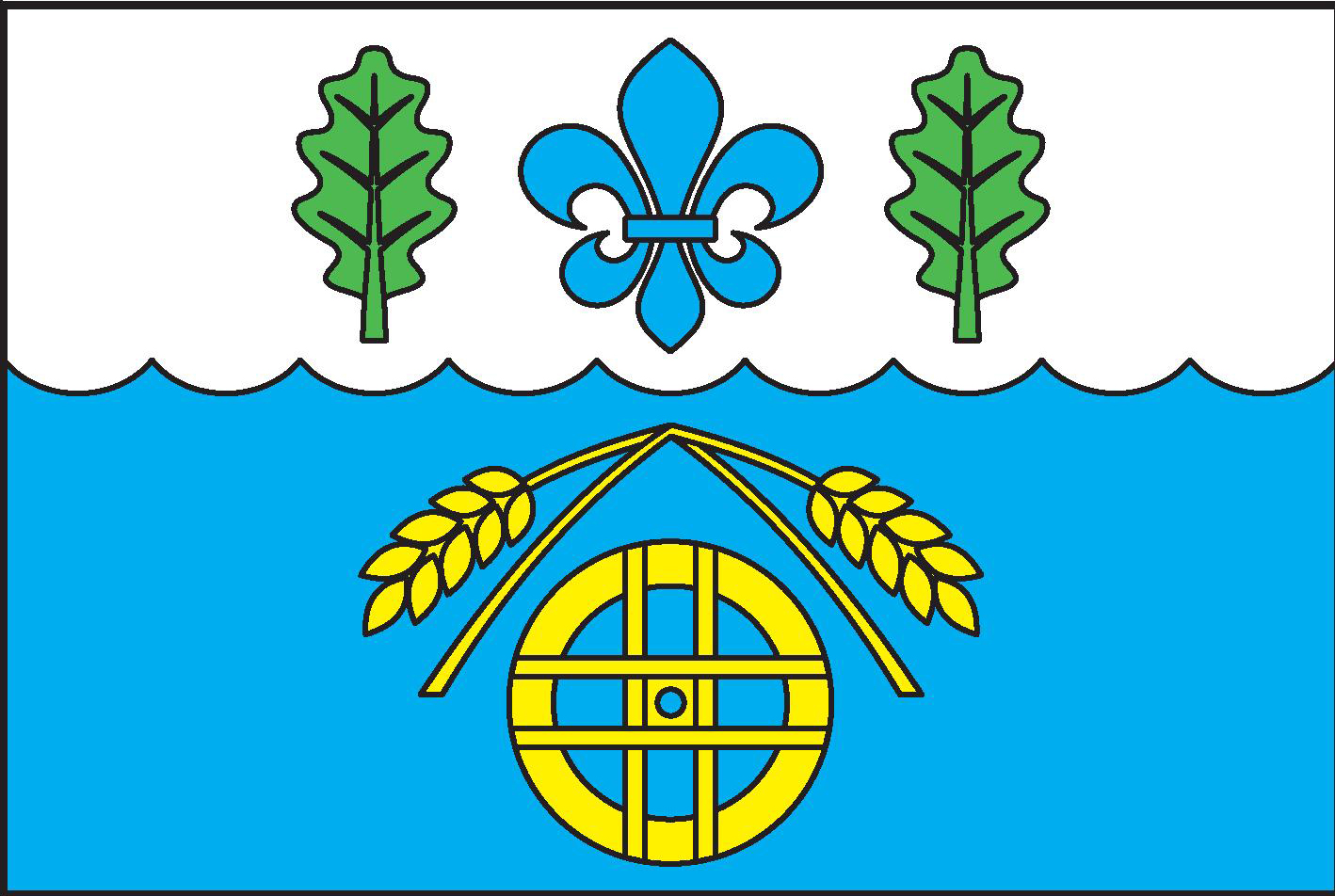
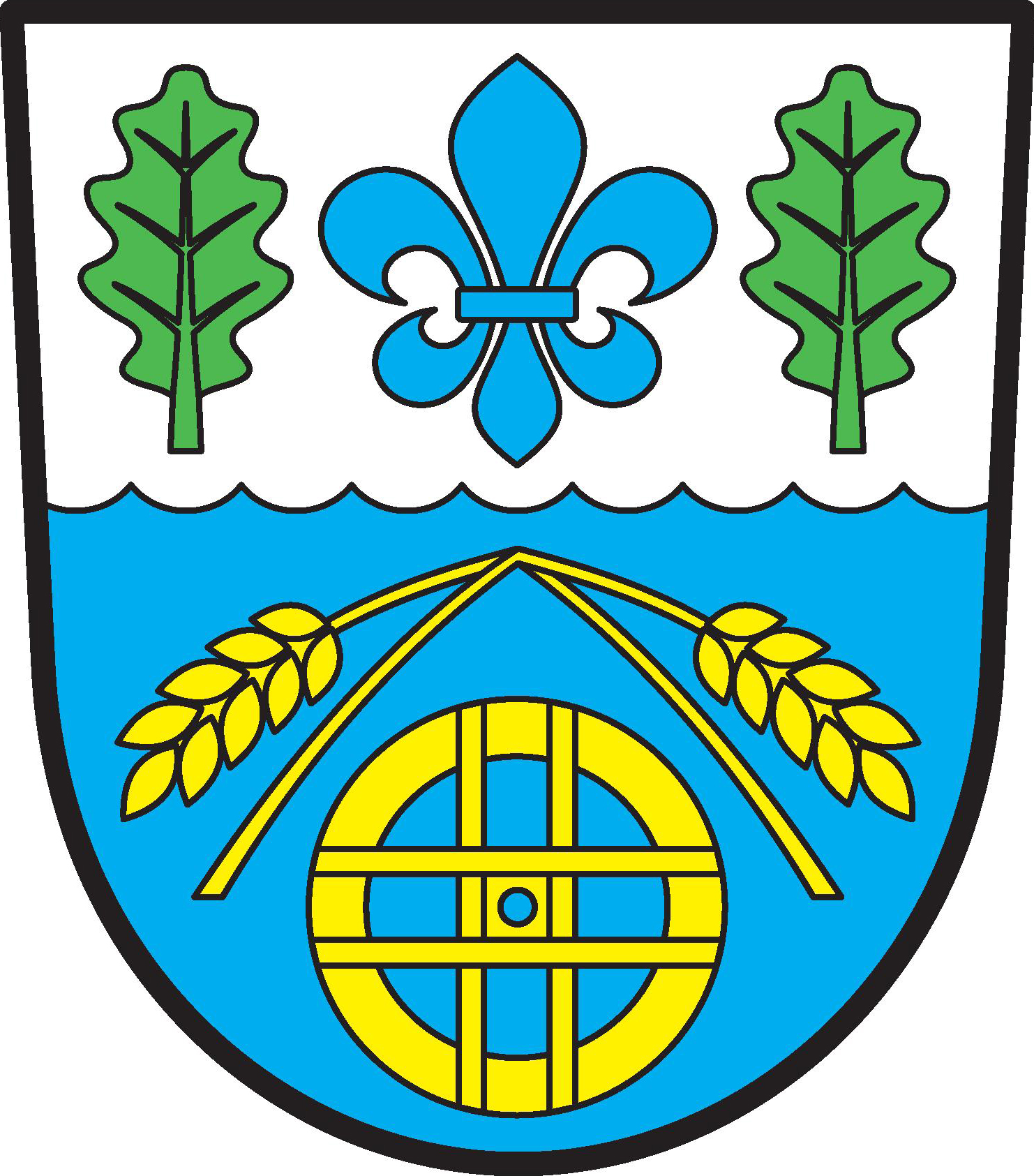
- Flag Coat of arms

- Location in the Czech Republic
- Coordinates: 49°33′26″N 13°28′21″E
- Country: Czech Republic
- Region: Plzeň
- District: Plzeň-South
- First mentioned: 1379

Area
  - Total: 4.13 km^{2} (1.59 sq mi)
- Elevation: 440 m (1,440 ft)

Population (2026-01-01)
  - Total: 137
  - Density: 33.2/km^{2} (85.9/sq mi)
- Time zone: UTC+1 (CET)
  - Summer (DST): UTC+2 (CEST)
- Postal code: 336 01
- Website: www.obec-drahkov.cz

Drahkov is a municipality and village in Plzeň-South District in the Plzeň Region of the Czech Republic. It has about 100 inhabitants.

Drahkov lies approximately 23 kilometres (14 mi) south of Plzeň and 91 km (57 mi) south-west of Prague.

== Demographics ==
Historical population
Year	Pop.	±%
1869	264	—
1880	264	+0.0%
1890	258	−2.3%
1900	255	−1.2%
1910	262	+2.7%
1921	295	+12.6%
1930	247	−16.3%
1950	190	−23.1%
1961	201	+5.8%
1970	184	−8.5%
1980	159	−13.6%
1991	140	−11.9%
2001	133	−5.0%
2011	116	−12.8%
2021	151	+30.2%
Source: Censuses
