= Oplot (Plzeň-South District) =

- Municipality
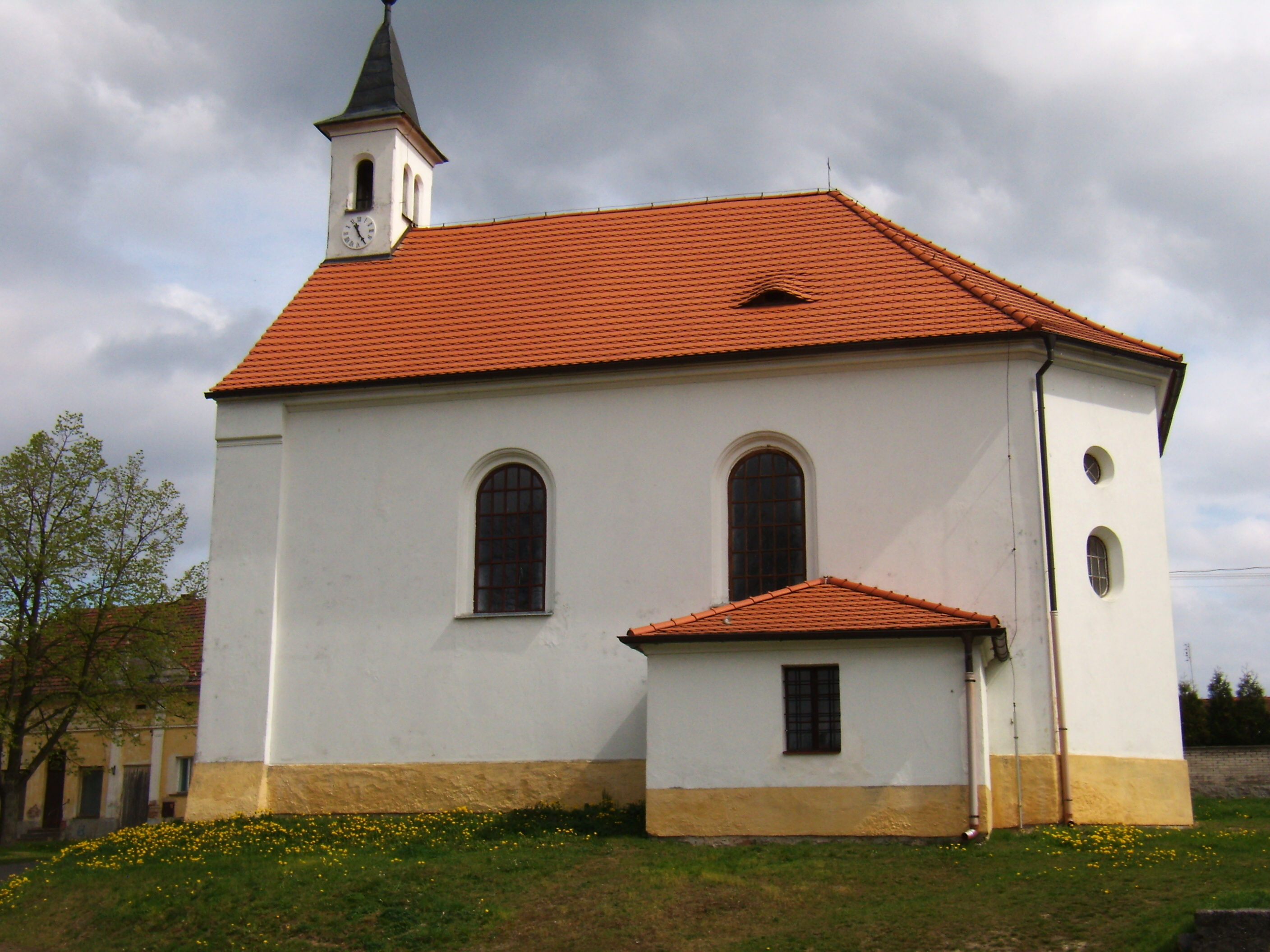
- Chapel of the Virgin Mary

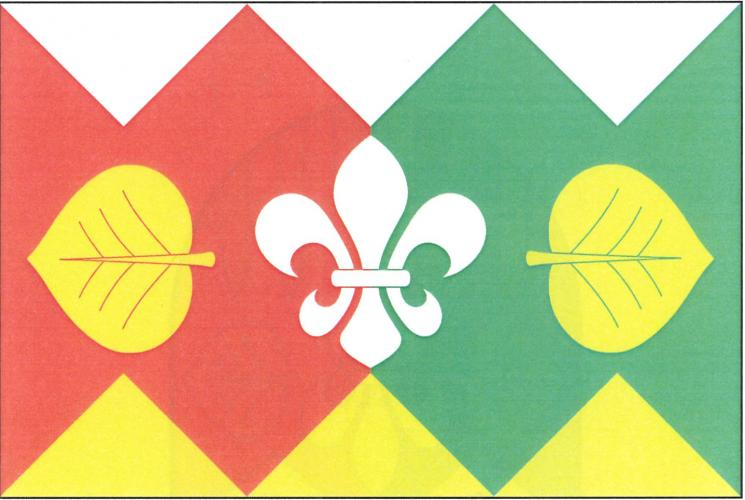
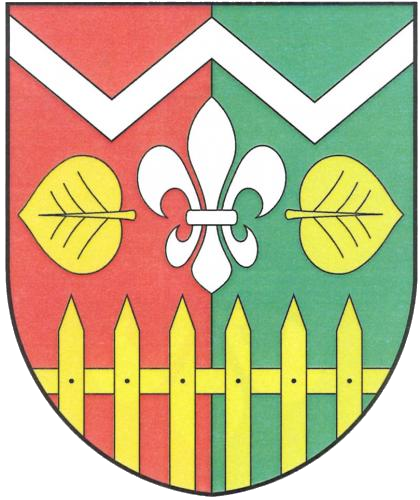
- Flag Coat of arms

- Location in the Czech Republic
- Coordinates: 49°34′48″N 13°16′27″E
- Country: Czech Republic
- Region: Plzeň
- District: Plzeň-South
- First mentioned: 1243

Area
  - Total: 6.88 km^{2} (2.66 sq mi)
- Elevation: 408 m (1,339 ft)

Population (2026-01-01)
  - Total: 349
  - Density: 50.7/km^{2} (131/sq mi)
- Time zone: UTC+1 (CET)
  - Summer (DST): UTC+2 (CEST)
- Postal code: 334 01
- Website: www.oplot.cz

Oplot is a municipality and village in Plzeň-South District in the Plzeň Region of the Czech Republic. It has about 300 inhabitants.

Oplot lies approximately 20 kilometres (12 mi) south of Plzeň and 100 km (62 mi) south-west of Prague.

== Demographics ==
Historical population
| Year | Pop. | ±% |
|---|---|---|
| 1869 | 403 | — |
| 1880 | 477 | +18.4% |
| 1890 | 509 | +6.7% |
| 1900 | 528 | +3.7% |
| 1910 | 600 | +13.6% |
| 1921 | 616 | +2.7% |
| 1930 | 596 | −3.2% |
| 1950 | 431 | −27.7% |
| 1961 | 434 | +0.7% |
| 1970 | 395 | −9.0% |
| 1980 | 388 | −1.8% |
| 1991 | 338 | −12.9% |
| 2001 | 331 | −2.1% |
| 2011 | 333 | +0.6% |
| 2021 | 317 | −4.8% |
Source: Censuses
