= Louňová =

- Municipality
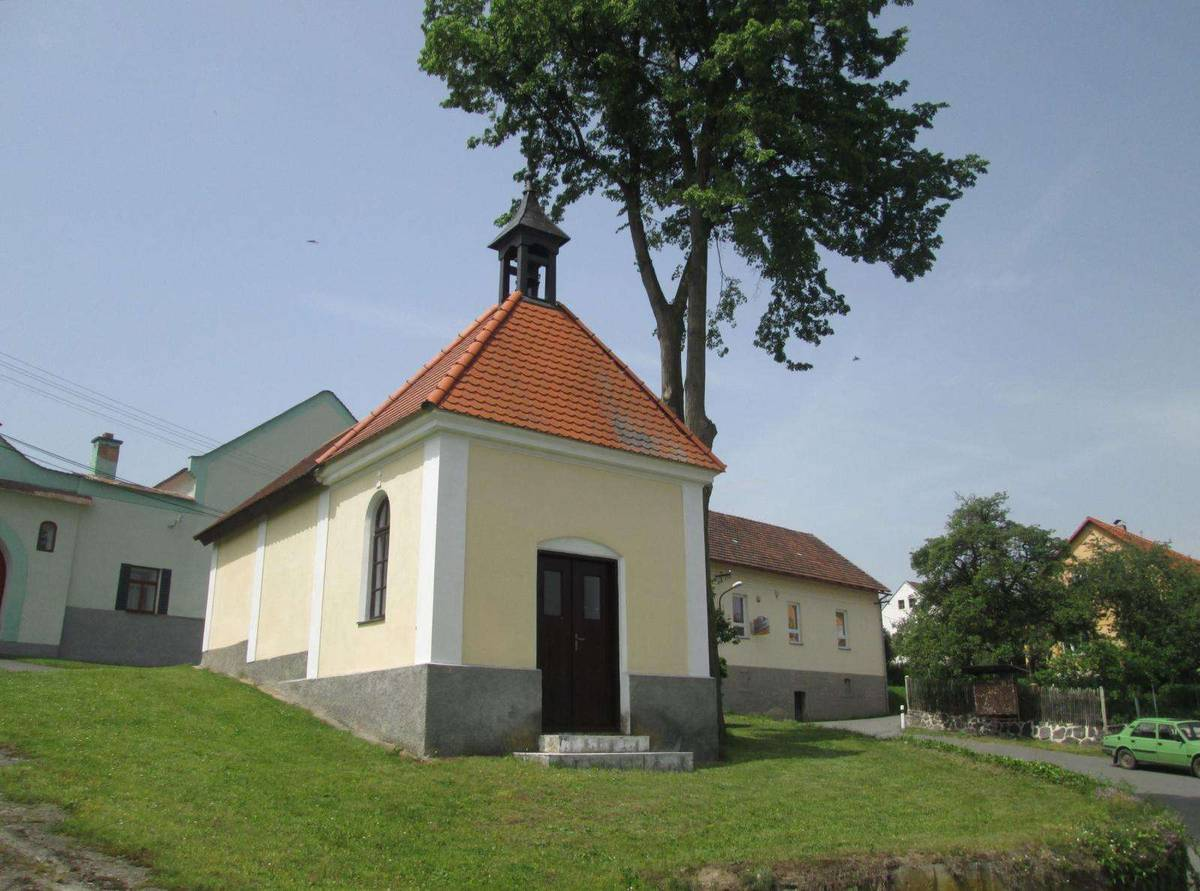
- Chapel of Saint Anne

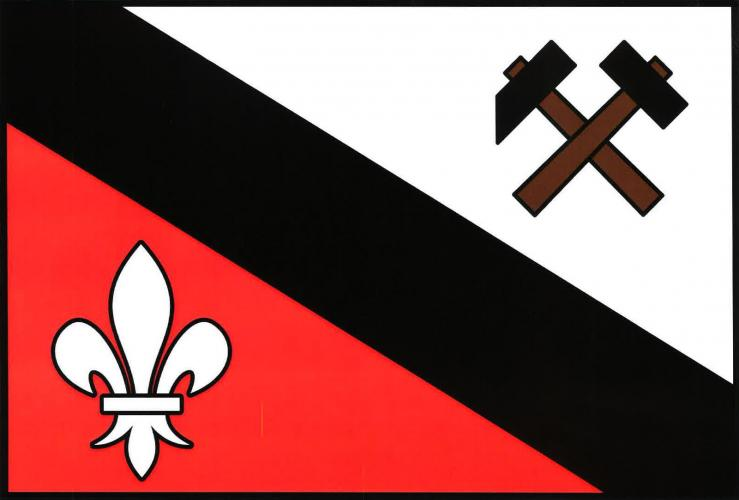
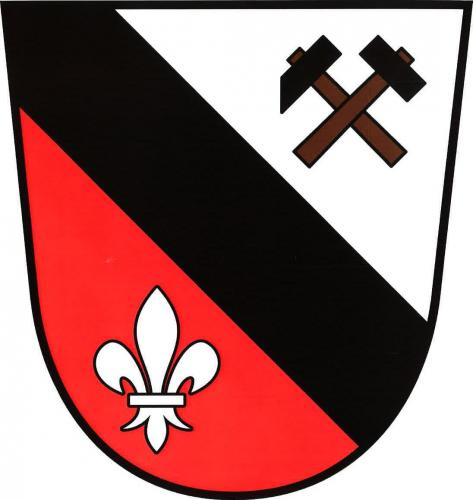
- Flag Coat of arms

- Location in the Czech Republic
- Coordinates: 49°33′46″N 13°36′34″E
- Country: Czech Republic
- Region: Plzeň
- District: Plzeň-South
- First mentioned: 1358

Area
  - Total: 6.07 km^{2} (2.34 sq mi)
- Elevation: 471 m (1,545 ft)

Population (2026-01-01)
  - Total: 116
  - Density: 19.1/km^{2} (49.5/sq mi)
- Time zone: UTC+1 (CET)
  - Summer (DST): UTC+2 (CEST)
- Postal code: 336 01
- Website: www.obec-lounova.cz

Louňová is a municipality and village in Plzeň-South District in the Plzeň Region of the Czech Republic. It has about 100 inhabitants.

Louňová lies approximately 27 kilometres (17 mi) south-east of Plzeň and 83 km (52 mi) south-west of Prague.

== Demographics ==
Historical population
Year	Pop.	±%
1869	326	—
1880	331	+1.5%
1890	294	−11.2%
1900	332	+12.9%
1910	304	−8.4%
1921	301	−1.0%
1930	272	−9.6%
1950	209	−23.2%
1961	205	−1.9%
1970	158	−22.9%
1980	121	−23.4%
1991	93	−23.1%
2001	75	−19.4%
2011	64	−14.7%
2021	96	+50.0%
Source: Censuses
