= Nekvasovy =

- Municipality
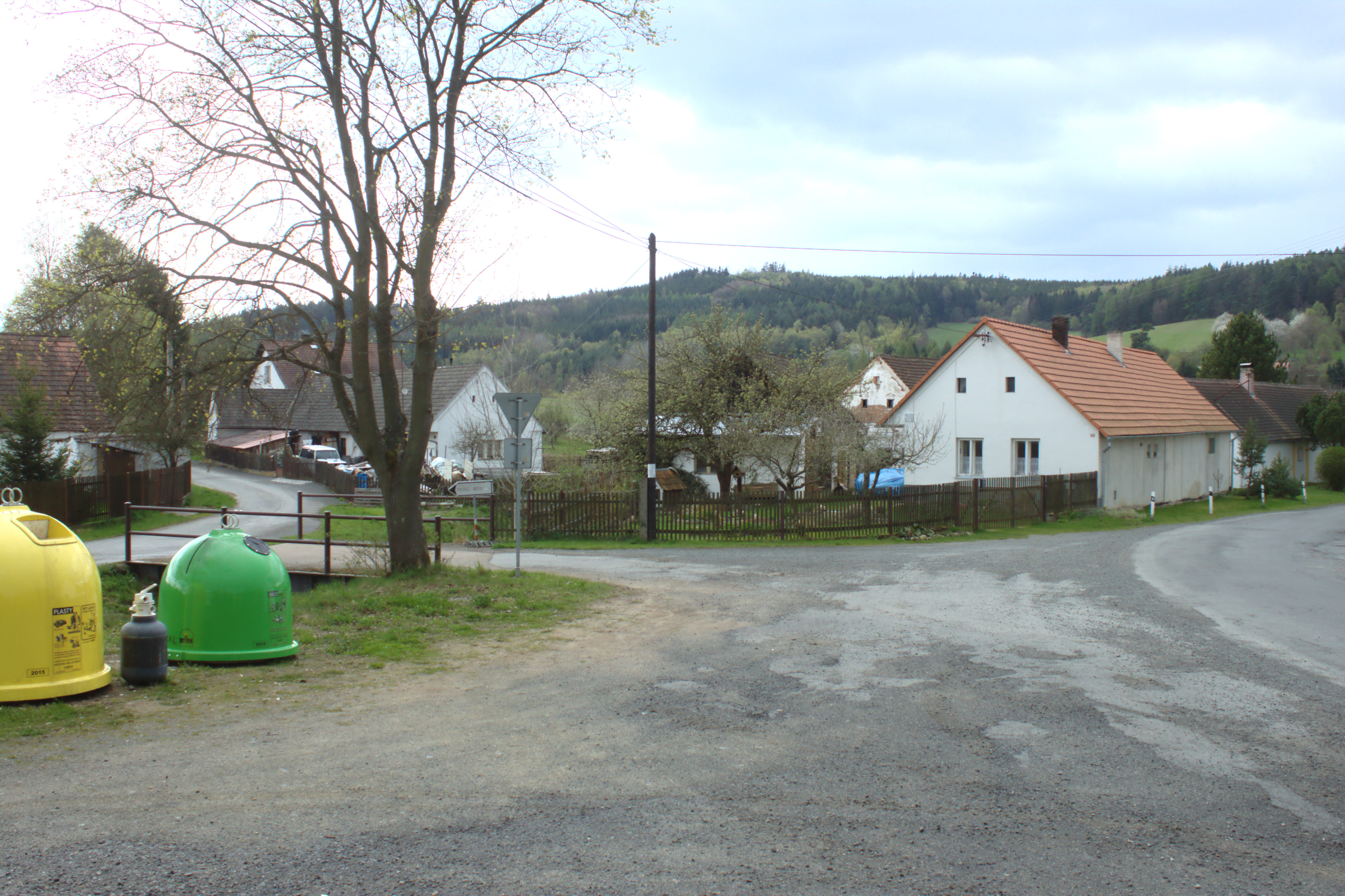
- Centre of Nekvasovy

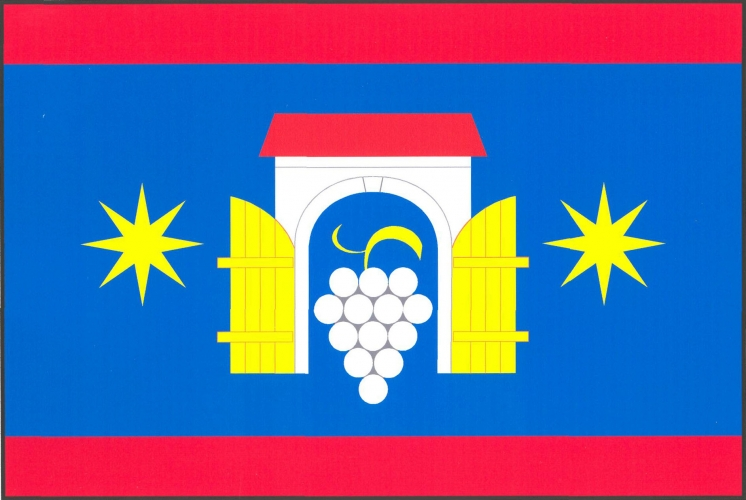
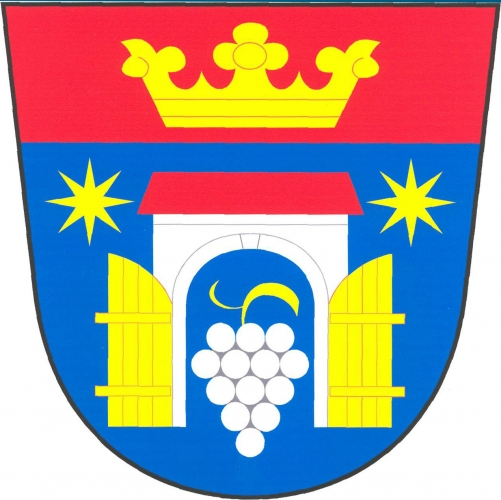
- Flag Coat of arms

- Location in the Czech Republic
- Coordinates: 49°26′5″N 13°37′33″E
- Country: Czech Republic
- Region: Plzeň
- District: Plzeň-South
- First mentioned: 1558

Area
  - Total: 6.04 km^{2} (2.33 sq mi)
- Elevation: 479 m (1,572 ft)

Population (2026-01-01)
  - Total: 193
  - Density: 32.0/km^{2} (82.8/sq mi)
- Time zone: UTC+1 (CET)
  - Summer (DST): UTC+2 (CEST)
- Postal code: 335 47
- Website: www.obecnekvasovy.cz

Nekvasovy is a municipality and village in Plzeň-South District in the Plzeň Region of the Czech Republic. It has about 200 inhabitants.

Nekvasovy lies approximately 40 kilometres (25 mi) south-east of Plzeň and 93 km (58 mi) south-west of Prague.

== Demographics ==
Historical population
Year	Pop.	±%
1869	448	—
1880	476	+6.2%
1890	450	−5.5%
1900	470	+4.4%
1910	459	−2.3%
1921	498	+8.5%
1930	478	−4.0%
1950	381	−20.3%
1961	398	+4.5%
1970	365	−8.3%
1980	279	−23.6%
1991	243	−12.9%
2001	216	−11.1%
2011	180	−16.7%
2021	167	−7.2%
Source: Censuses
