= Útušice =

- Municipality
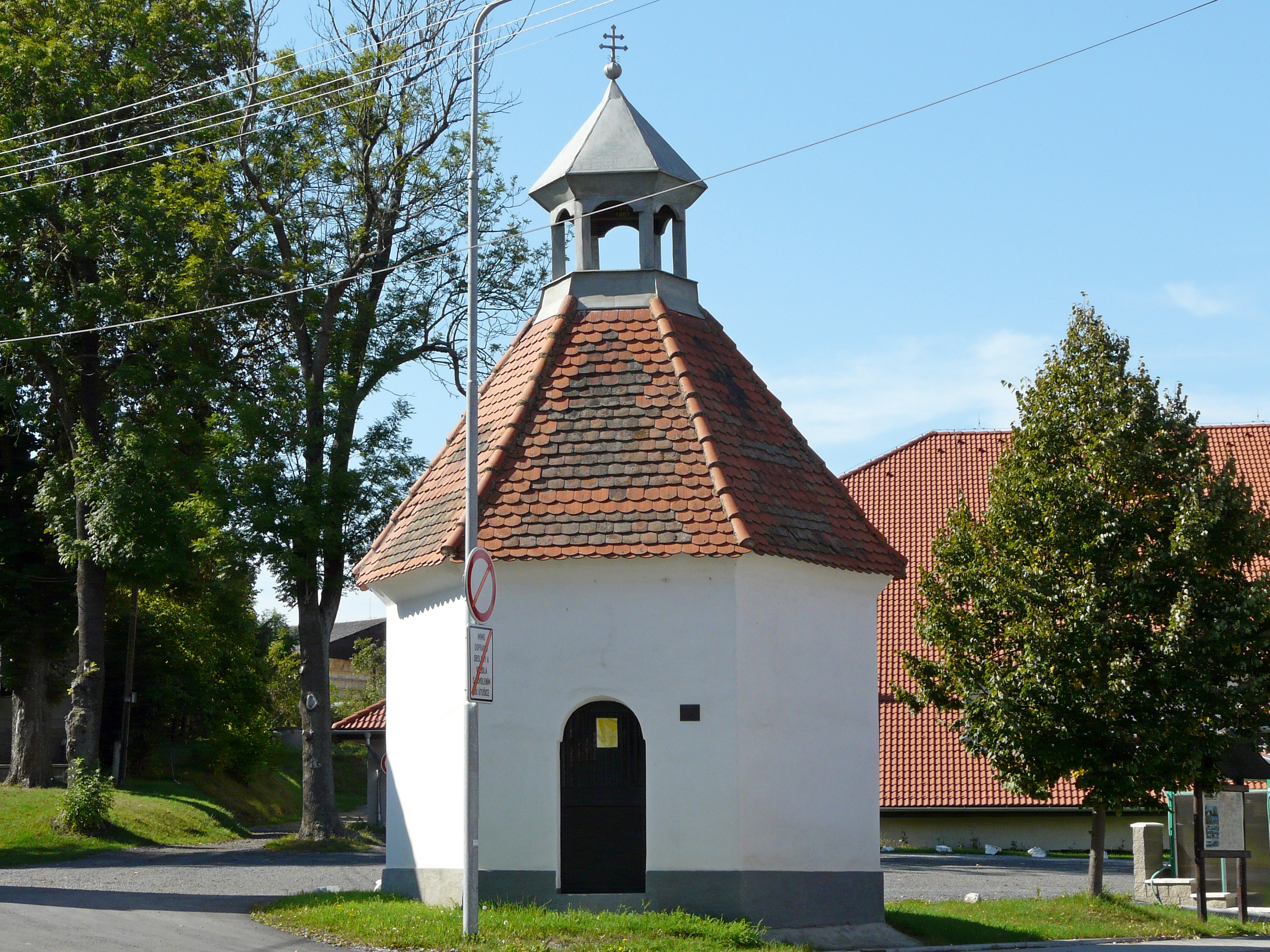
- Chapel in the centre

- Location in the Czech Republic
- Coordinates: 49°40′40″N 13°22′56″E
- Country: Czech Republic
- Region: Plzeň
- District: Plzeň-South
- First mentioned: 1393

Area
  - Total: 15.66 km^{2} (6.05 sq mi)
- Elevation: 335 m (1,099 ft)

Population (2026-01-01)
  - Total: 711
  - Density: 45.4/km^{2} (118/sq mi)
- Time zone: UTC+1 (CET)
  - Summer (DST): UTC+2 (CEST)
- Postal code: 332 09
- Website: www.utusice.cz

Útušice is a municipality and village in Plzeň-South District in the Plzeň Region of the Czech Republic. It has about 700 inhabitants.

Útušice lies approximately 8 kilometres (5 mi) south of Plzeň and 88 km (55 mi) south-west of Prague.

== Administrative division ==
Útušice consists of two municipal parts (in brackets population according to the 2021 census):

- Útušice (522)
- Robčice (194)

== Demographics ==
Historical population
Year	Pop.	±%
1869	484	—
1880	594	+22.7%
1890	619	+4.2%
1900	669	+8.1%
1910	762	+13.9%
1921	756	−0.8%
1930	774	+2.4%
1950	619	−20.0%
1961	651	+5.2%
1970	611	−6.1%
1980	596	−2.5%
1991	503	−15.6%
2001	516	+2.6%
2011	671	+30.0%
2021	716	+6.7%
Source: Censuses
