= Únětice (Plzeň-South District) =

- Municipality
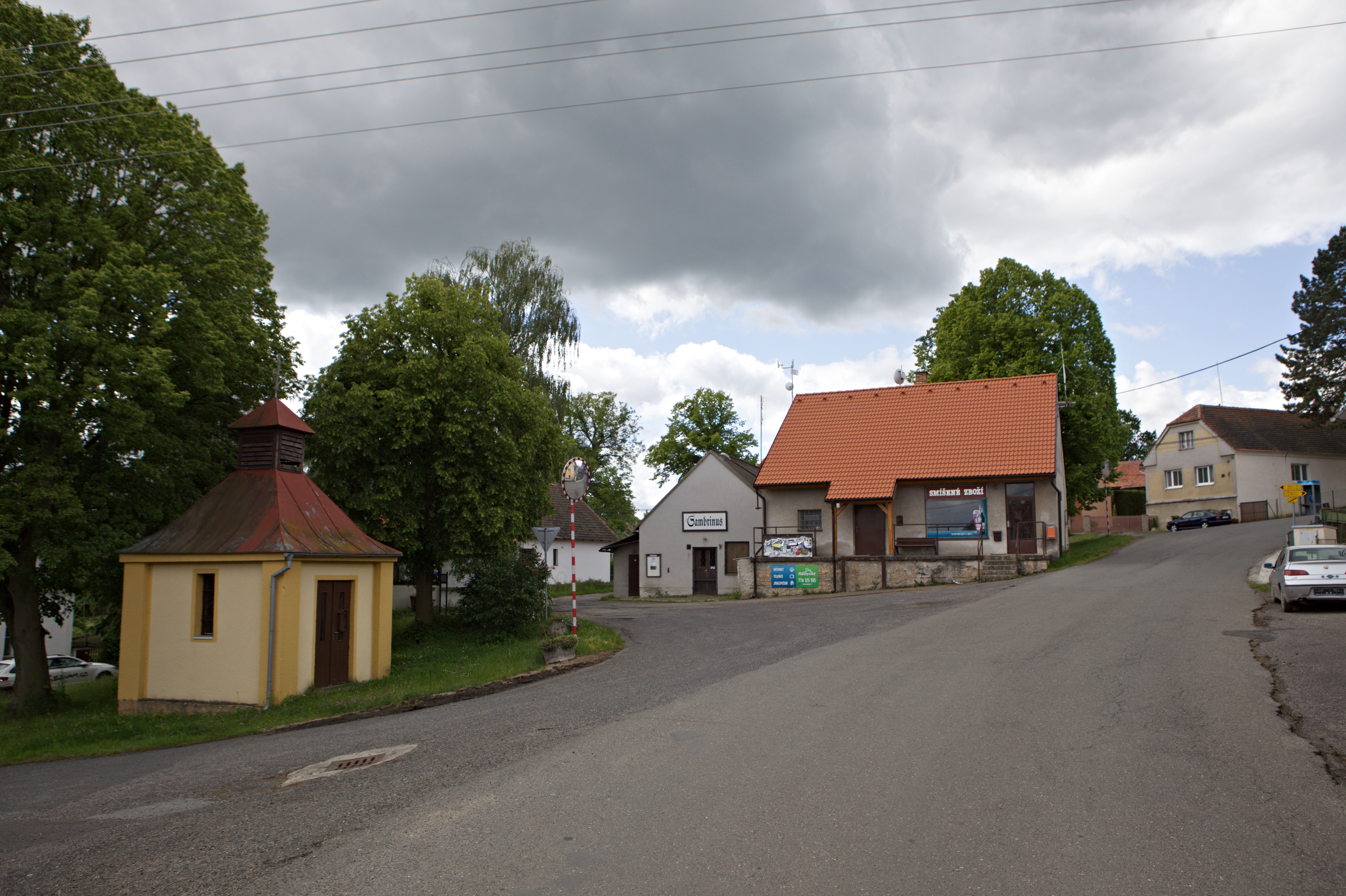
- Centre of Únětice

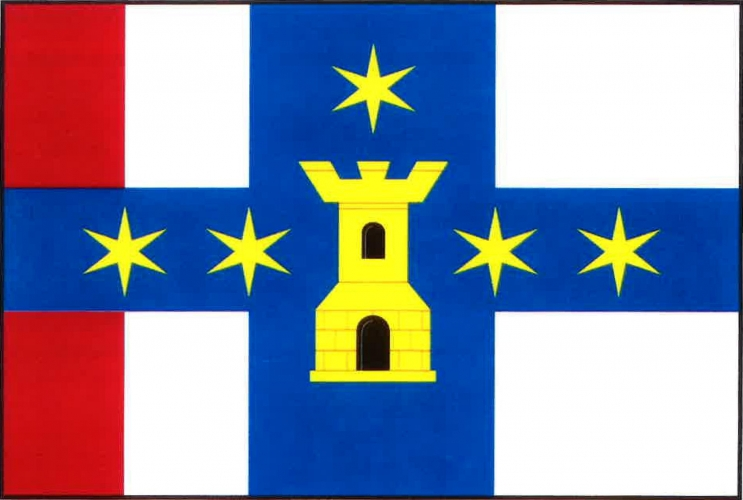
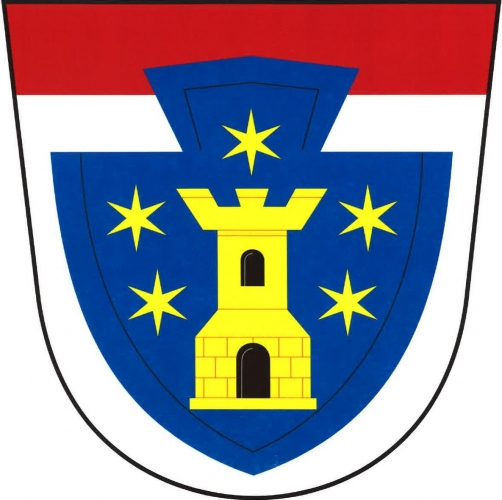
- Flag Coat of arms

- Location in the Czech Republic
- Coordinates: 49°35′4″N 13°28′12″E
- Country: Czech Republic
- Region: Plzeň
- District: Plzeň-South
- First mentioned: 1358

Area
  - Total: 6.00 km^{2} (2.32 sq mi)
- Elevation: 493 m (1,617 ft)

Population (2026-01-01)
  - Total: 166
  - Density: 27.7/km^{2} (71.7/sq mi)
- Time zone: UTC+1 (CET)
  - Summer (DST): UTC+2 (CEST)
- Postal code: 336 01
- Website: www.obec-unetice.cz

Únětice is a municipality and village in Plzeň-South District in the Plzeň Region of the Czech Republic. It has about 200 inhabitants.

Únětice lies approximately 20 kilometres (12 mi) south of Plzeň and 89 km (55 mi) south-west of Prague.

== Demographics ==
Historical population
Year	Pop.	±%
1869	270	—
1880	260	−3.7%
1890	246	−5.4%
1900	197	−19.9%
1910	217	+10.2%
1921	219	+0.9%
1930	218	−0.5%
1950	168	−22.9%
1961	167	−0.6%
1970	157	−6.0%
1980	145	−7.6%
1991	133	−8.3%
2001	120	−9.8%
2011	141	+17.5%
2021	149	+5.7%
Source: Censuses
