= Prádlo =

Municipality in the Czech Republic

- Municipality
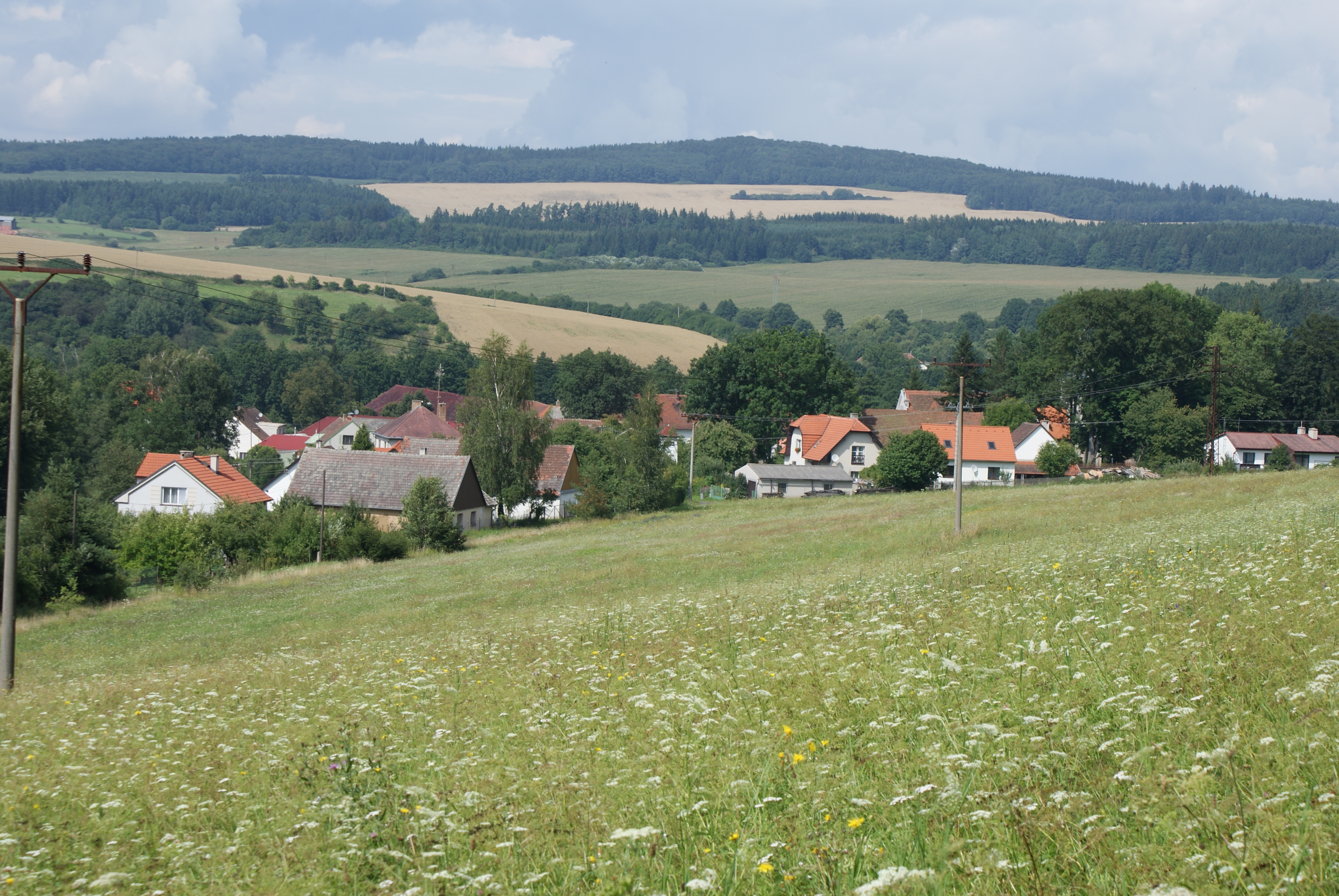
- General view

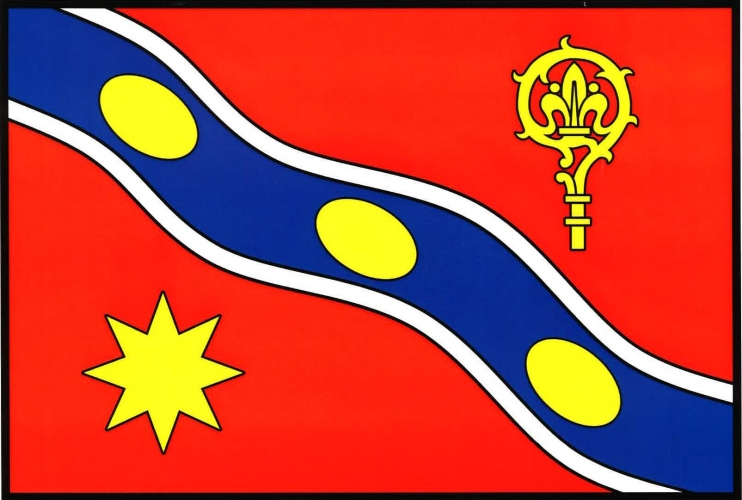
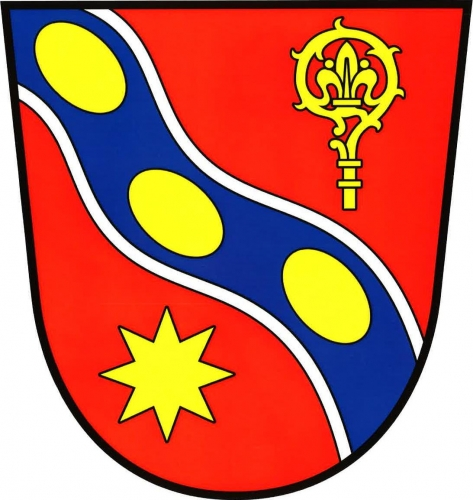
- Flag Coat of arms

- Location in the Czech Republic
- Coordinates: 49°30′13″N 13°32′29″E
- Country: Czech Republic
- Region: Plzeň
- District: Plzeň-South
- First mentioned: 1552

Area
  - Total: 8.32 km^{2} (3.21 sq mi)
- Elevation: 452 m (1,483 ft)

Population (2026-01-01)
  - Total: 224
  - Density: 26.9/km^{2} (69.7/sq mi)
- Time zone: UTC+1 (CET)
  - Summer (DST): UTC+2 (CEST)
- Postal code: 335 01
- Website: www.obecpradlo.cz

Prádlo is a municipality and village in Plzeň-South District in the Plzeň Region of the Czech Republic. It has about 200 inhabitants.

Prádlo lies approximately 30 kilometres (19 mi) south-east of Plzeň and 91 km (57 mi) south-west of Prague.

== Administrative division ==
Prádlo consists of two municipal parts (in brackets population according to the 2021 census):

- Prádlo (176)
- Novotníky (40)

== Demographics ==
Historical population
Year	Pop.	±%
1869	591	—
1880	665	+12.5%
1890	714	+7.4%
1900	666	−6.7%
1910	650	−2.4%
1921	611	−6.0%
1930	569	−6.9%
1950	403	−29.2%
1961	405	+0.5%
1970	368	−9.1%
1980	291	−20.9%
1991	252	−13.4%
2001	217	−13.9%
2011	259	+19.4%
2021	216	−16.6%
Source: Censuses
