= Tojice =

- Municipality
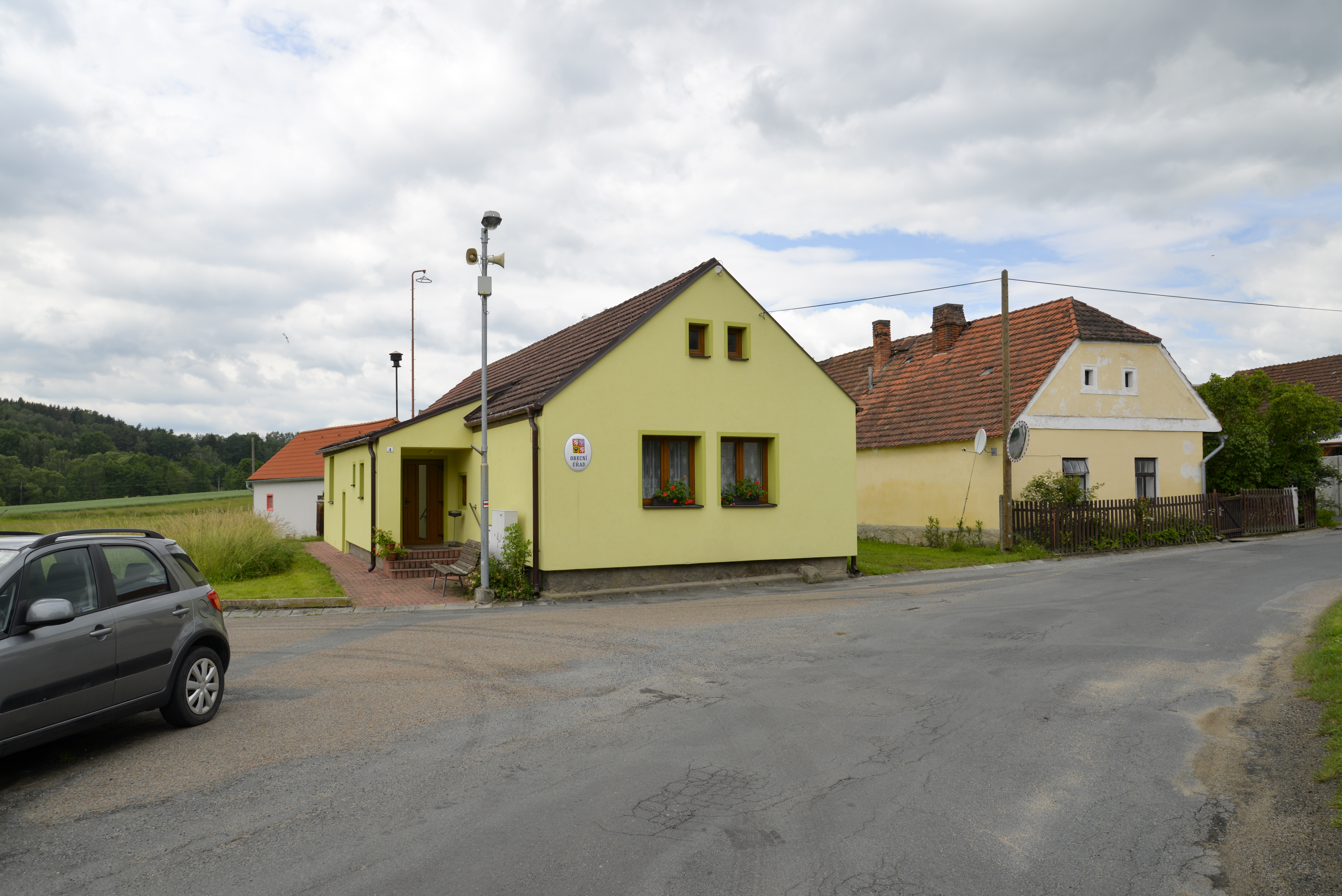
- Municipal office

- Location in the Czech Republic
- Coordinates: 49°29′33″N 13°37′36″E
- Country: Czech Republic
- Region: Plzeň
- District: Plzeň-South
- First mentioned: 1371

Area
  - Total: 2.41 km^{2} (0.93 sq mi)
- Elevation: 344 m (1,129 ft)

Population (2026-01-01)
  - Total: 106
  - Density: 44.0/km^{2} (114/sq mi)
- Time zone: UTC+1 (CET)
  - Summer (DST): UTC+2 (CEST)
- Postal code: 335 01
- Website: www.tojice.cz

Tojice is a municipality and village in Plzeň-South District in the Plzeň Region of the Czech Republic. It has about 100 inhabitants.

Tojice lies approximately 34 kilometres (21 mi) south-east of Plzeň and 87 km (54 mi) south-west of Prague.

== Demographics ==
Historical population
Year	Pop.	±%
1869	201	—
1880	245	+21.9%
1890	230	−6.1%
1900	225	−2.2%
1910	234	+4.0%
1921	245	+4.7%
1930	243	−0.8%
1950	166	−31.7%
1961	165	−0.6%
1970	143	−13.3%
1980	115	−19.6%
1991	101	−12.2%
2001	97	−4.0%
2011	80	−17.5%
2021	93	+16.3%
Source: Censuses
