= Jarov (Plzeň-South District) =

- Municipality
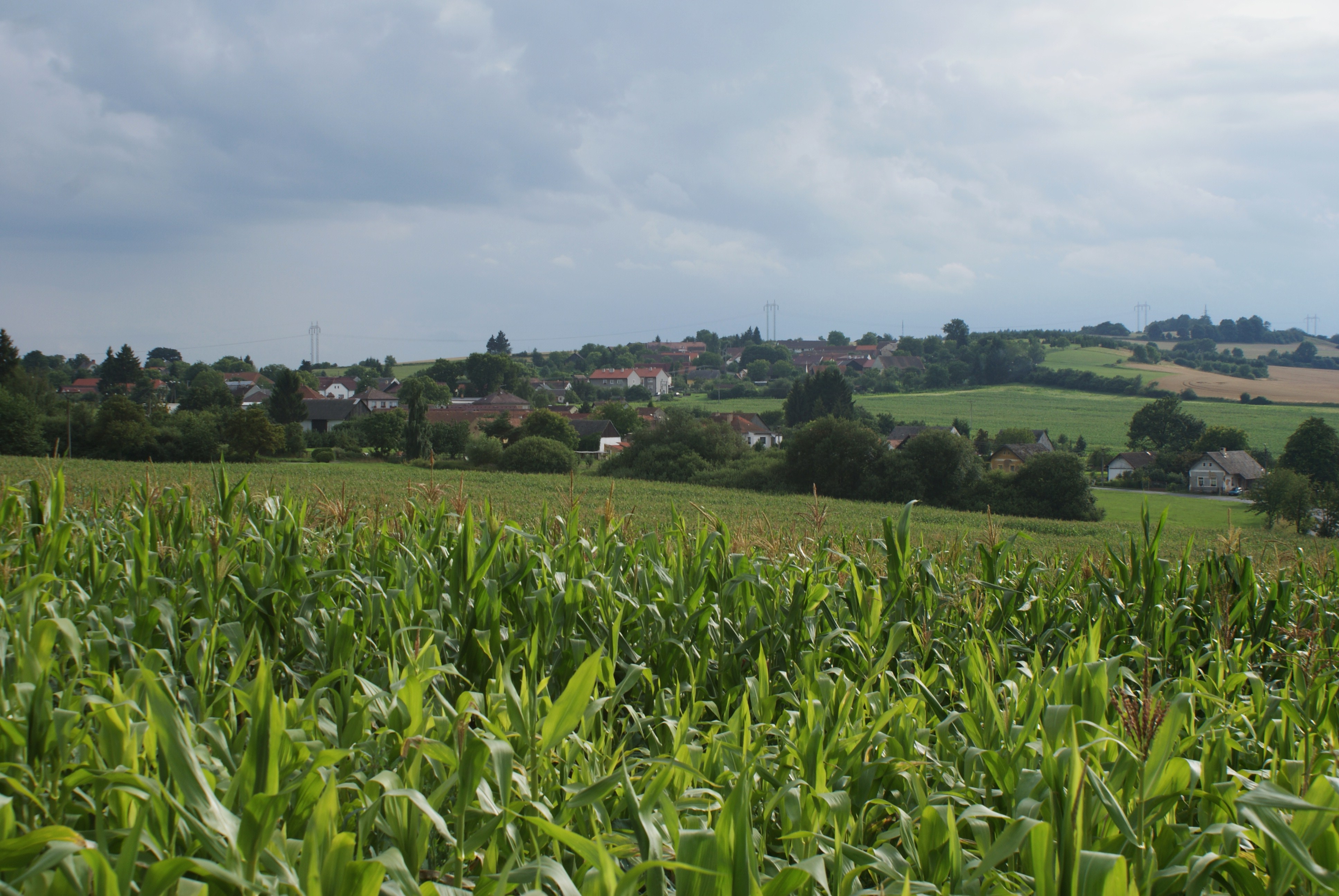
- General view

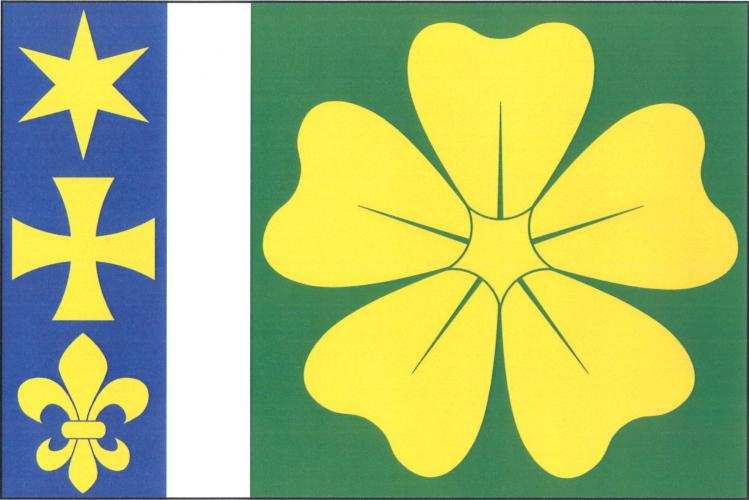
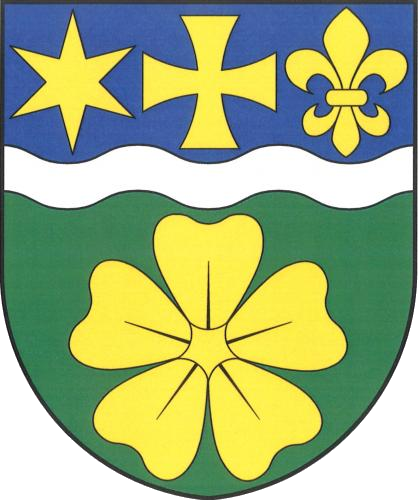
- Flag Coat of arms

- Location in the Czech Republic
- Coordinates: 49°31′16″N 13°30′27″E
- Country: Czech Republic
- Region: Plzeň
- District: Plzeň-South
- First mentioned: 1558

Area
  - Total: 5.37 km^{2} (2.07 sq mi)
- Elevation: 525 m (1,722 ft)

Population (2026-01-01)
  - Total: 224
  - Density: 41.7/km^{2} (108/sq mi)
- Time zone: UTC+1 (CET)
  - Summer (DST): UTC+2 (CEST)
- Postal code: 335 01
- Website: www.obecjarov.cz

Jarov is a municipality and village in Plzeň-South District in the Plzeň Region of the Czech Republic. It has about 200 inhabitants.

Jarov lies approximately 27 kilometres (17 mi) south of Plzeň and 91 km (57 mi) south-west of Prague.

== Demographics ==
Historical population
| Year | Pop. | ±% |
|---|---|---|
| 1869 | 360 | — |
| 1880 | 457 | +26.9% |
| 1890 | 447 | −2.2% |
| 1900 | 492 | +10.1% |
| 1910 | 507 | +3.0% |
| 1921 | 526 | +3.7% |
| 1930 | 503 | −4.4% |
| 1950 | 412 | −18.1% |
| 1961 | 397 | −3.6% |
| 1970 | 370 | −6.8% |
| 1980 | 325 | −12.2% |
| 1991 | 266 | −18.2% |
| 2001 | 230 | −13.5% |
| 2011 | 232 | +0.9% |
| 2021 | 207 | −10.8% |
Source: Censuses
