= Zemětice =

- Municipality
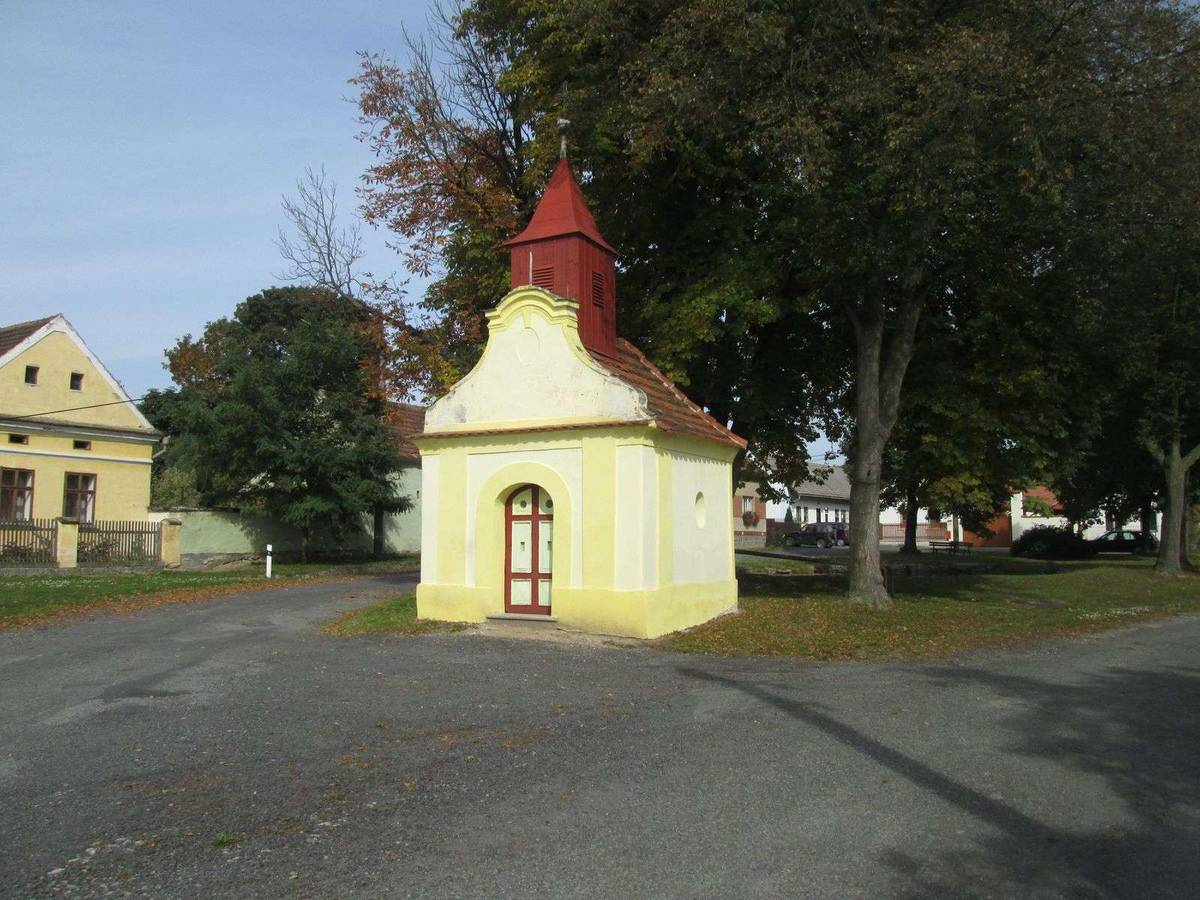
- Chalupy, a part of Zemětice

- Location in the Czech Republic
- Coordinates: 49°34′43″N 13°11′11″E
- Country: Czech Republic
- Region: Plzeň
- District: Plzeň-South
- First mentioned: 1115

Area
  - Total: 6.25 km^{2} (2.41 sq mi)
- Elevation: 375 m (1,230 ft)

Population (2026-01-01)
  - Total: 363
  - Density: 58.1/km^{2} (150/sq mi)
- Time zone: UTC+1 (CET)
  - Summer (DST): UTC+2 (CEST)
- Postal code: 334 52
- Website: www.obeczemetice.cz

Zemětice is a municipality and village in Plzeň-South District in the Plzeň Region of the Czech Republic. It has about 400 inhabitants.

== Administrative division ==
Zemětice consists of three municipal parts (in brackets population according to the 2021 census):

- Zemětice (160)
- Čelákovy (114)
- Chalupy (39)

== Geography ==
Zemětice is located about 21 kilometres (13 mi) southwest of Plzeň. It lies in the Švihov Highlands. The highest point is at 435 m (1,427 ft) above sea level. The Merklínka River flows through the municipality.

== Demographics ==
Historical population
Year	Pop.	±%
1869	756	—
1880	738	−2.4%
1890	706	−4.3%
1900	782	+10.8%
1910	949	+21.4%
1921	957	+0.8%
1930	929	−2.9%
1950	625	−32.7%
1961	632	+1.1%
1970	528	−16.5%
1980	392	−25.8%
1991	317	−19.1%
2001	273	−13.9%
2011	252	−7.7%
2021	313	+24.2%
Source: Censuses
