= Kozlovice (Plzeň-South District) =

- Municipality
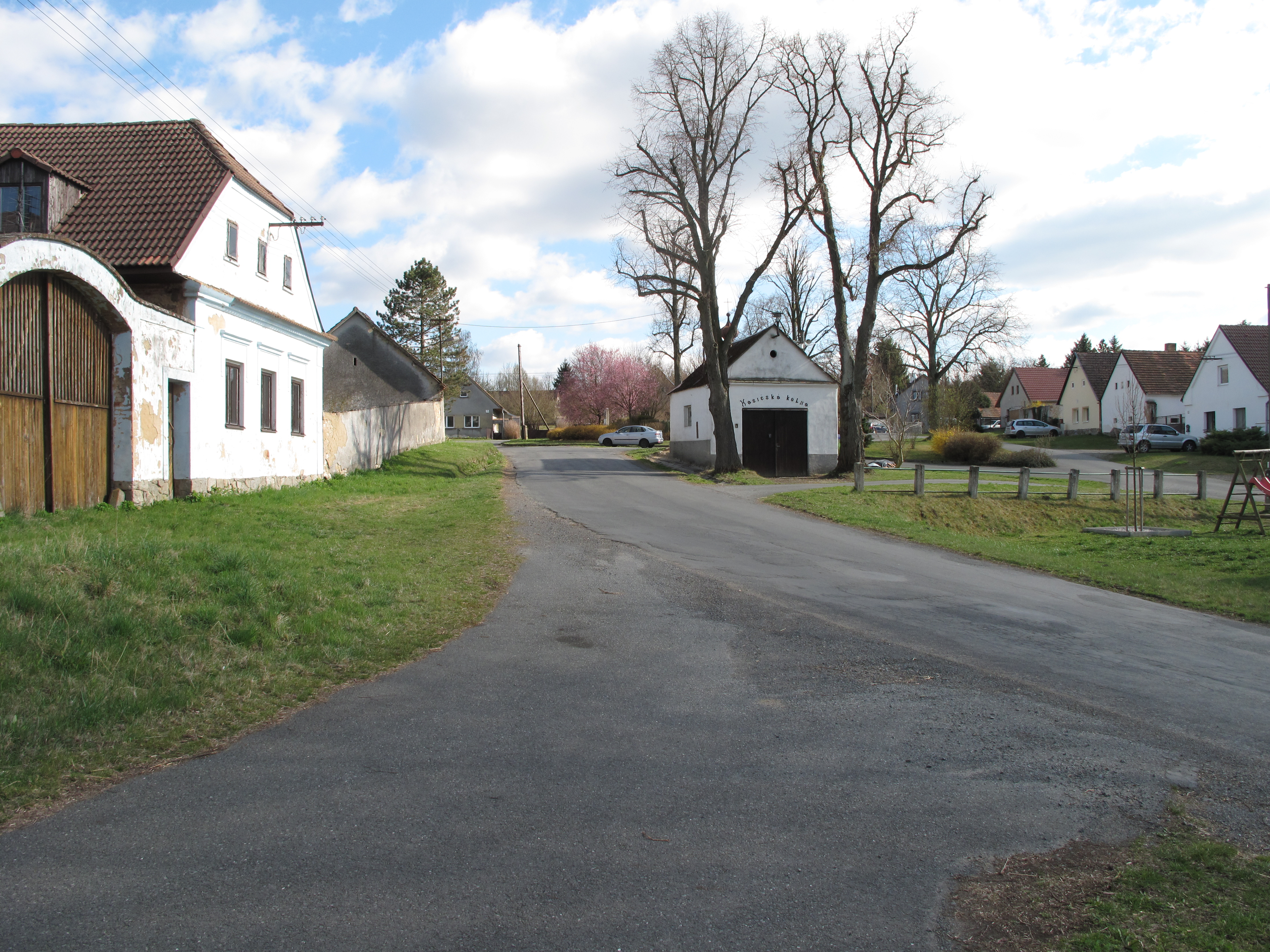
- Centre of Kozlovice

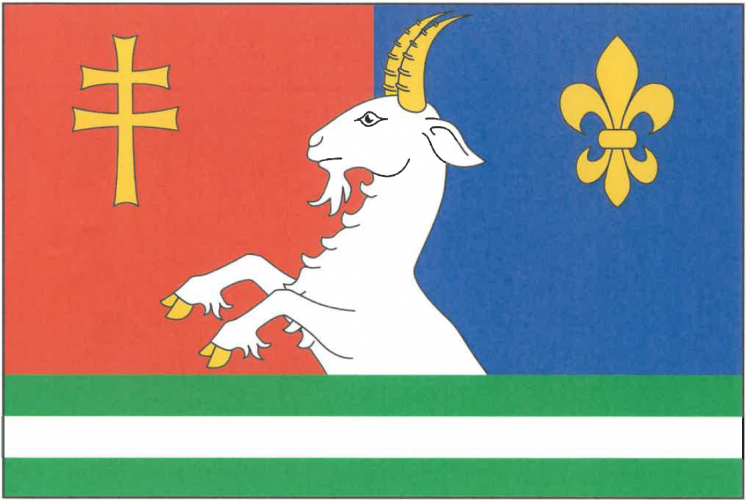
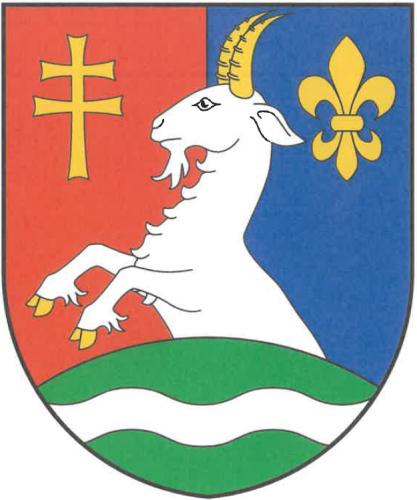
- Flag Coat of arms

- Location in the Czech Republic
- Coordinates: 49°27′54″N 13°34′58″E
- Country: Czech Republic
- Region: Plzeň
- District: Plzeň-South
- First mentioned: 1551

Area
  - Total: 3.86 km^{2} (1.49 sq mi)
- Elevation: 485 m (1,591 ft)

Population (2026-01-01)
  - Total: 100
  - Density: 26/km^{2} (67/sq mi)
- Time zone: UTC+1 (CET)
  - Summer (DST): UTC+2 (CEST)
- Postal code: 335 01
- Website: www.kozlovice-pj.cz

Kozlovice is a municipality and village in Plzeň-South District in the Plzeň Region of the Czech Republic. It has about 100 inhabitants.

Kozlovice lies approximately 35 kilometres (22 mi) south-east of Plzeň and 92 km (57 mi) south-west of Prague.

== Demographics ==
Historical population
Year	Pop.	±%
1869	305	—
1880	302	−1.0%
1890	286	−5.3%
1900	284	−0.7%
1910	295	+3.9%
1921	298	+1.0%
1930	231	−22.5%
1950	197	−14.7%
1961	201	+2.0%
1970	166	−17.4%
1980	114	−31.3%
1991	88	−22.8%
2001	87	−1.1%
2011	88	+1.1%
2021	96	+9.1%
Source: Censuses
