= Neuměř =

- Municipality
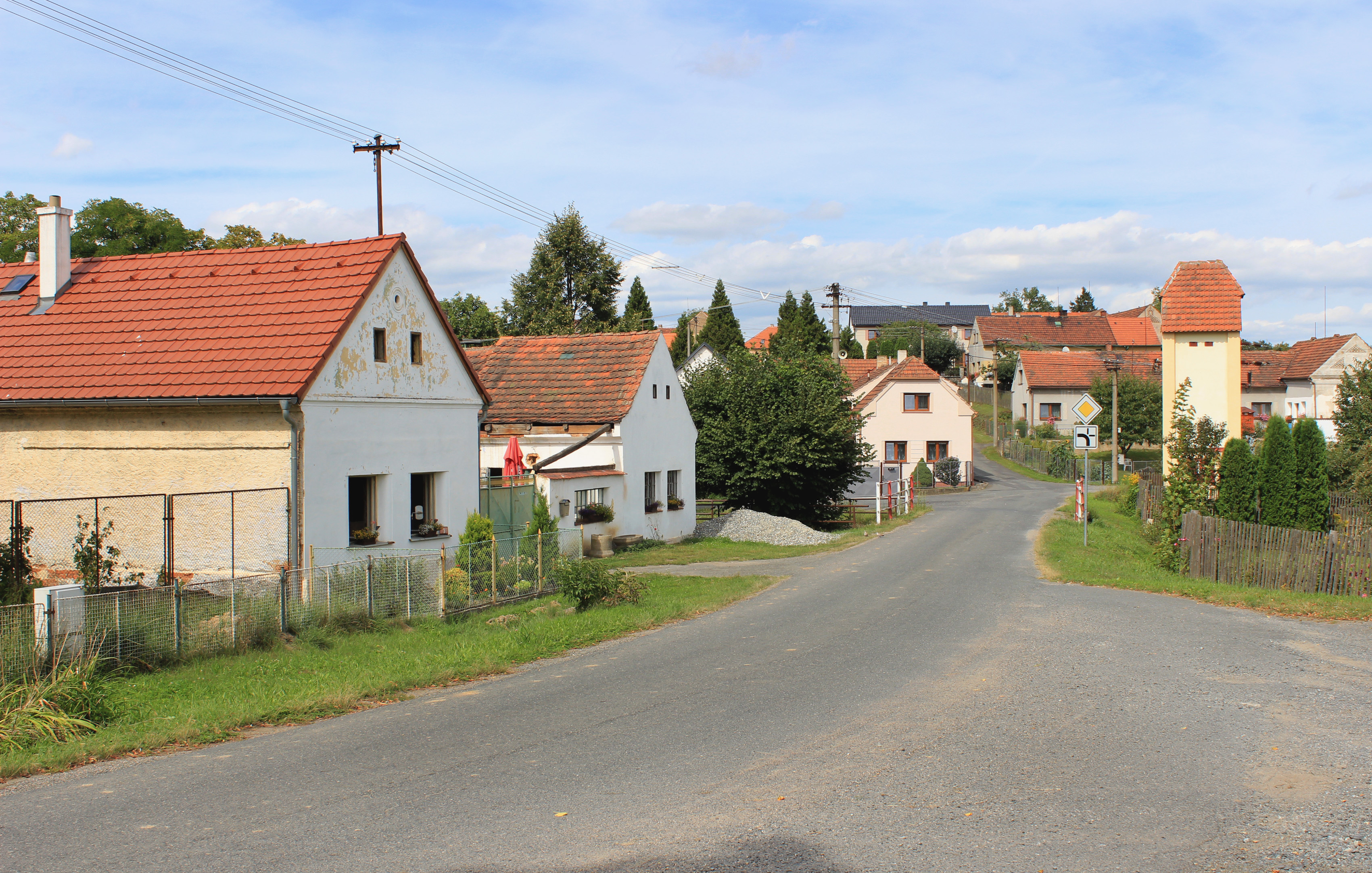
- Main road

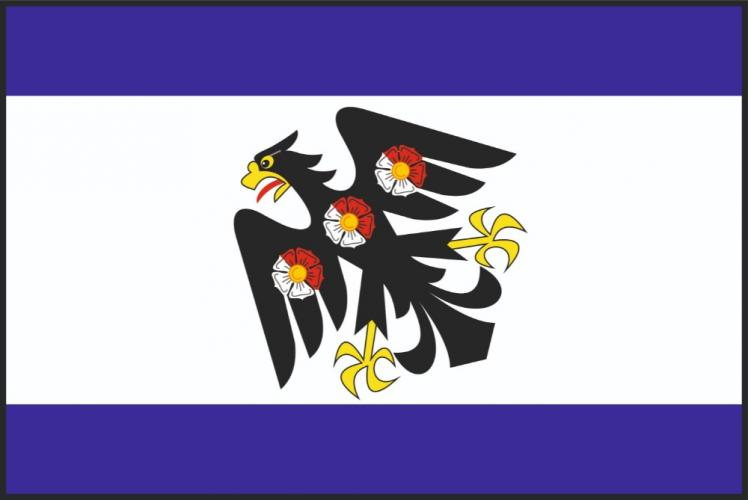
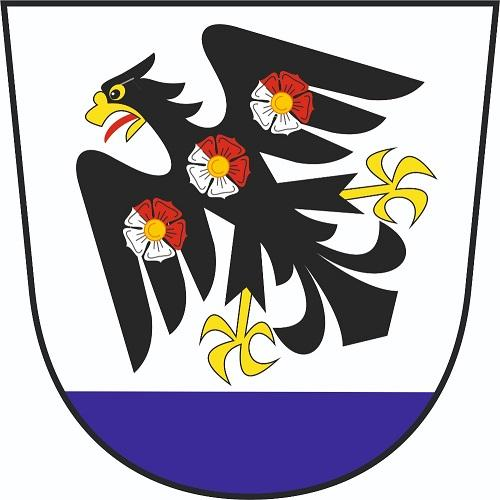
- Flag Coat of arms

- Location in the Czech Republic
- Coordinates: 49°35′52″N 13°3′51″E
- Country: Czech Republic
- Region: Plzeň
- District: Plzeň-South
- First mentioned: 1587

Area
  - Total: 4.65 km^{2} (1.80 sq mi)
- Elevation: 392 m (1,286 ft)

Population (2026-01-01)
  - Total: 159
  - Density: 34.2/km^{2} (88.6/sq mi)
- Time zone: UTC+1 (CET)
  - Summer (DST): UTC+2 (CEST)
- Postal code: 345 62
- Website: www.neumer.cz

Neuměř is a municipality and village in Plzeň-South District in the Plzeň Region of the Czech Republic. It has about 200 inhabitants.

Neuměř lies approximately 27 km (17 mi) south-west of Plzeň, and 111 km (69 mi) south-west of Prague.

== History ==
The first written mention of Neuměř is from 1587.

From 1 January 2021, Neuměř is no longer a part of Domažlice District and belongs to Plzeň-South District.

== Demographics ==
Historical population
Year	Pop.	±%
1869	164	—
1880	158	−3.7%
1890	151	−4.4%
1900	190	+25.8%
1910	234	+23.2%
1921	236	+0.9%
1930	288	+22.0%
1950	199	−30.9%
1961	215	+8.0%
1970	208	−3.3%
1980	174	−16.3%
1991	130	−25.3%
2001	131	+0.8%
2011	134	+2.3%
2021	149	+11.2%
Source: Censuses
