= Plzeň-South District =

Plzeň-South District Okres Plzeň-jih
- District
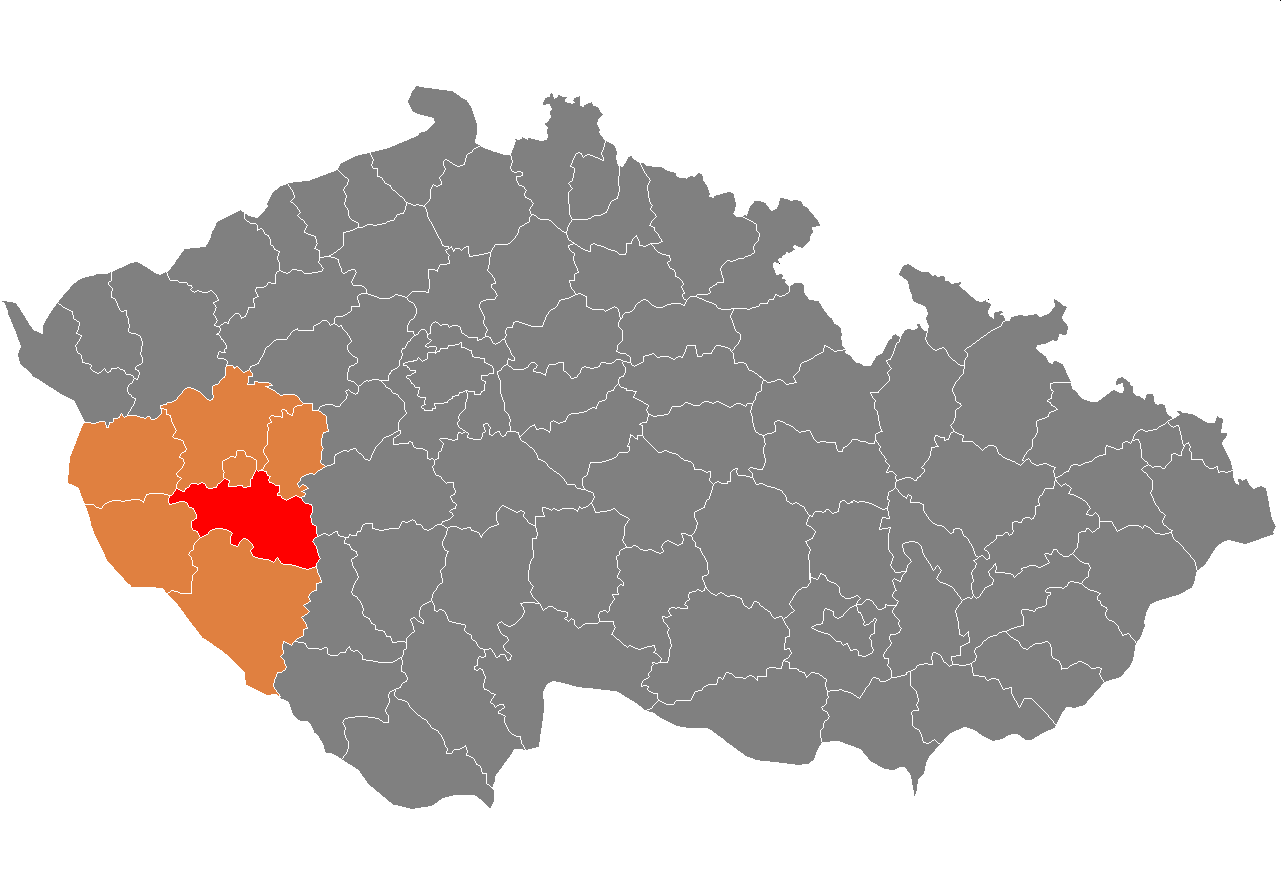
- Location in the Plzeň Region within the Czech Republic
- Coordinates: 49°34′N 13°26′E
- Country: Czech Republic
- Region: Plzeň
- Capital: Plzeň

Area
  - Total: 1,068.23 km^{2} (412.45 sq mi)

Population (2026)
  - Total: 71,585
  - Density: 67.013/km^{2} (173.56/sq mi)
- Time zone: UTC+1 (CET)
  - Summer (DST): UTC+2 (CEST)
- Municipalities: 99
- * Towns: 8
- * Market towns: 1

Plzeň-South District (Czech: okres Plzeň-jih) is a district in the Plzeň Region of the Czech Republic. Its capital is the city of Plzeň. The most populous town of the district is Přeštice.

== Administrative division ==
Plzeň-South District is divided into four administrative districts of municipalities with extended competence: Blovice, Nepomuk, Přeštice and Stod.

=== List of municipalities ===
Towns are marked in bold and market towns in italics:

Blovice - Bolkov - Borovno - Borovy - Buková - Bukovec - Čečovice - Černovice - Chlum - Chlumčany - Chlumy - Chocenice - Chotěšov - Čižice - Čížkov - Čmelíny - Dnešice - Dobřany - Dolce - Dolní Lukavice - Drahkov - Holýšov - Honezovice - Horní Kamenice - Horní Lukavice - Horšice - Hradec - Hradiště - Jarov - Kasejovice - Kbel - Klášter - Kotovice - Kozlovice - Kramolín - Kvíčovice - Letiny - Lisov - Líšina - Louňová - Lužany - Měcholupy - Merklín - Mileč - Milínov - Míšov - Mladý Smolivec - Mohelnice - Nebílovy - Nekvasovy - Nepomuk - Netunice - Neuměř - Neurazy - Nezdice - Nezdřev - Nová Ves - Nové Mitrovice - Oplot - Oselce - Otěšice - Polánka - Prádlo - Předenice - Přestavlky - Přeštice - Příchovice - Ptenín - Radkovice - Roupov - Řenče - Seč - Sedliště - Skašov - Soběkury - Spálené Poříčí - Srby - Štěnovice - Štichov - Stod - Střelice - Střížovice - Tojice - Třebčice - Týniště - Únětice - Útušice - Ves Touškov - Vlčí - Vlčtejn - Vrčeň - Všekary - Vstiš - Zdemyslice - Zemětice - Žákava - Ždírec - Žinkovy - Životice

== Geography ==
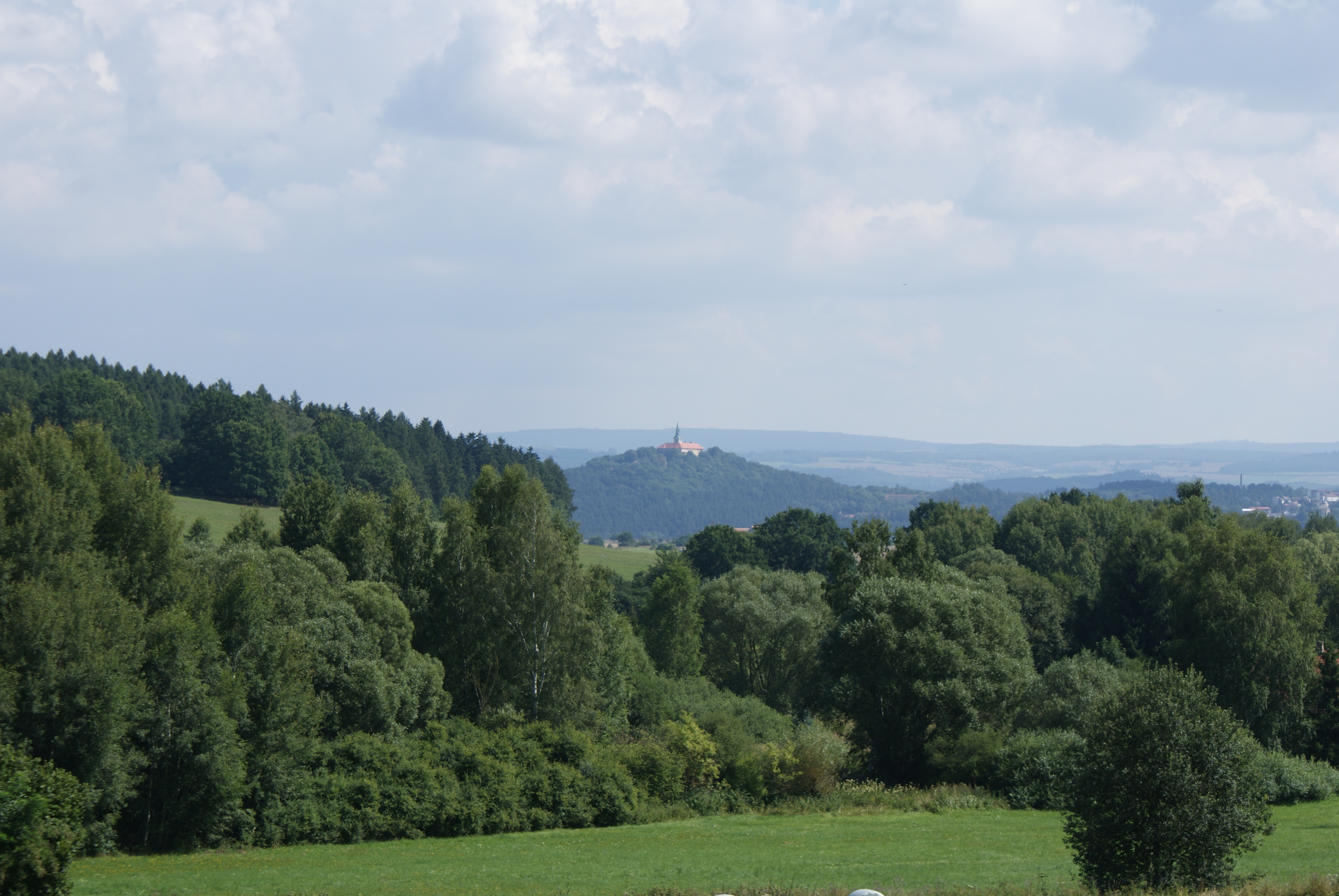
View towards Zelená Hora Castle

The terrain is hilly, most of the territory has the character of highlands. The territory extends into four geomorphological mesoregions: Švihov Highlands (most of the territory), Plasy Uplands (west and northwest), Blatná Uplands (southeast) and Brdy Highlands (northeast). The highest point of the district is the mountain Nad Marastkem in Čížkov with an elevation of 805 m (2,641 ft). The lowest point is the river bed of the Radbuza in Dobřany at 317 m (1,040 ft).

From the total district area of 1,068.2 km^{2} (412.4 sq mi), agricultural land occupies 617.1 km^{2} (238.3 sq mi), forests occupy 342.1 km^{2} (132.1 sq mi), and water area occupies 16.3 km^{2} (6.3 sq mi). Forests cover 32.0% of the district's area.

The territory is rich in watercourses. There are three important rivers that cross the district from south to north: Radbuza, Úhlava and Úslava. The Lomnice briefly crosses the district in the east. There are no significant bodies of water in the district.

Brdy is the protected landscape area that extends into the territory in the east.

== Demographics ==
Historical population

Year	Pop.	±%
1869	76,250	—
1880	82,276	+7.9%
1890	82,324	+0.1%
1900	85,138	+3.4%
1910	90,021	+5.7%

Year	Pop.	±%
1921	90,115	+0.1%
1930	90,863	+0.8%
1950	74,181	−18.4%
1961	74,279	+0.1%
1970	70,320	−5.3%

Year	Pop.	±%
1980	67,974	−3.3%
1991	63,344	−6.8%
2001	63,020	−0.5%
2011	68,556	+8.8%
2021	69,213	+1.0%

Source: Censuses (Note: Including Bukovec, Čečovice, Černovice, Holýšov, Horní Kamenice, Kvíčovice, Neuměř, Štichov and Všekary, which were part of Domažlice District until 2020.)

=== Most populous municipalities ===
Name	Population	Area (km^{2})
Přeštice	6,757	25
Dobřany	6,483	35
Holýšov	5,436	29
Blovice	4,258	29
Stod	3,694	20
Nepomuk	3,538	12
Chotěšov	3,051	27
Spálené Poříčí	3,034	58
Chlumčany	2,419	9
Štěnovice	2,356	8

== Economy ==
The largest employers with headquarters in Plzeň-South District and at least 500 employees are:

Economic entity	Location	Number of employees	Main activity
MD Elektronik	Chotěšov	2,000–2,499	Manufacture of electrical equipment
International Automotive Components Group	Přeštice	2,000–2,499	Automotive industry
Dobřany Psychiatric Hospital	Dobřany	1,000–1,499	Health care
Vishay Electronic	Přeštice	1,000–1,499	Manufacture of electrical equipment
Murr CZ	Stod	1,000–1,499	Manufacture of electrical equipment
Stod Hospital	Stod	500–999	Health care

== Transport ==
The D5 motorway (part of the European route E50) from Prague to Plzeň and the Czech–German border briefly passes through the district. The other important roads in the district are the I/27 (part of European route E53) from Plzeň to the Czech–German border via Klatovy, and the I/20 (part of European route E49) from Karlovy Vary to Plzeň and Písek.

== Sights ==
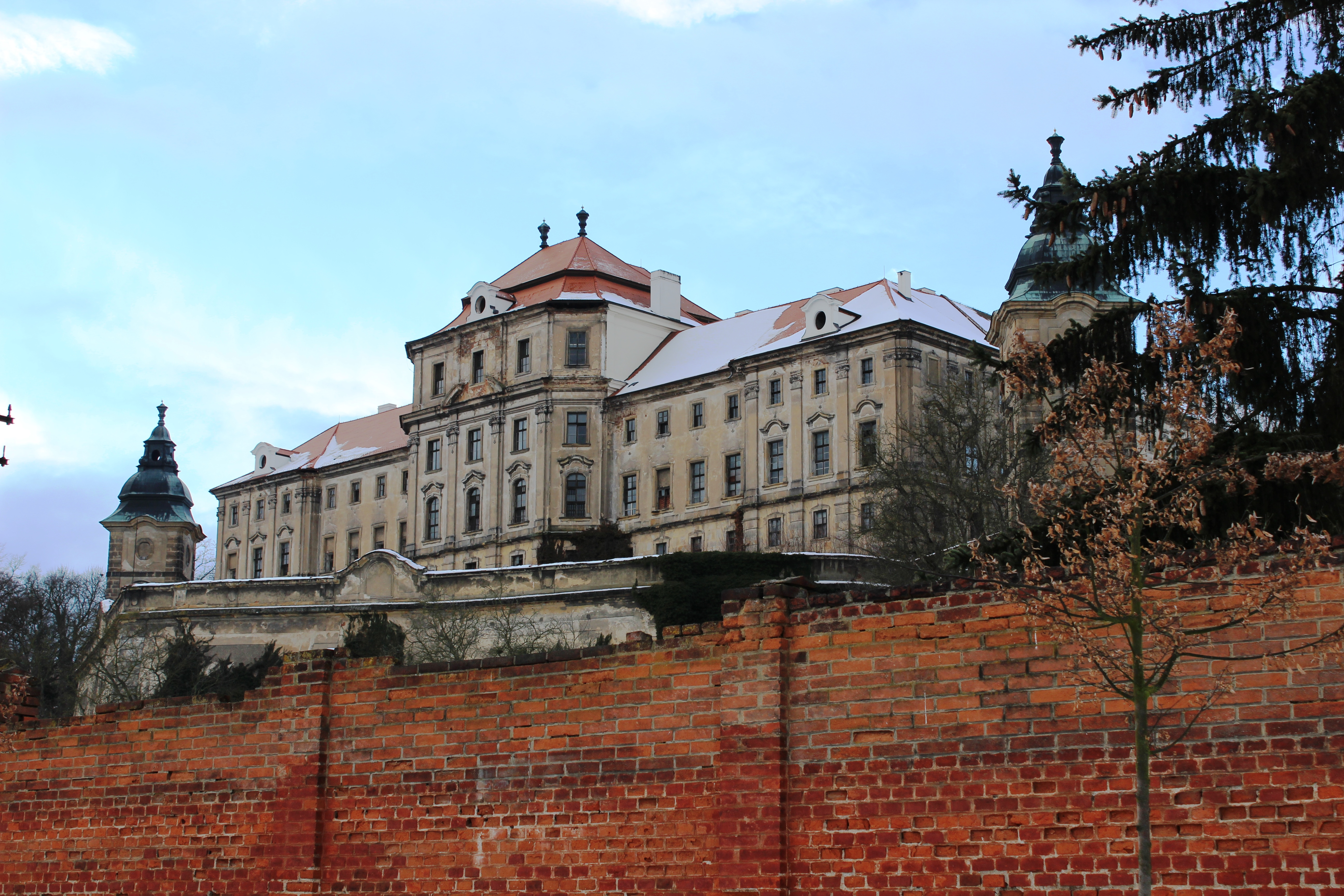
Chotěšov Abbey

The most important monuments in the district, protected as national cultural monuments, are:

- Church of Saint Nicholas in Čečovice
- Church of the Assumption of the Virgin Mary in Přeštice
- Chotěšov Abbey

The best-preserved settlements, protected as monument zones, are:

- Dobřany
- Spálené Poříčí
- Lipnice
- Mítov
- Řesanice
- Zahrádka

The most visited tourist destination is the Chotěšov Abbey.
