= Třebčice =

- Municipality
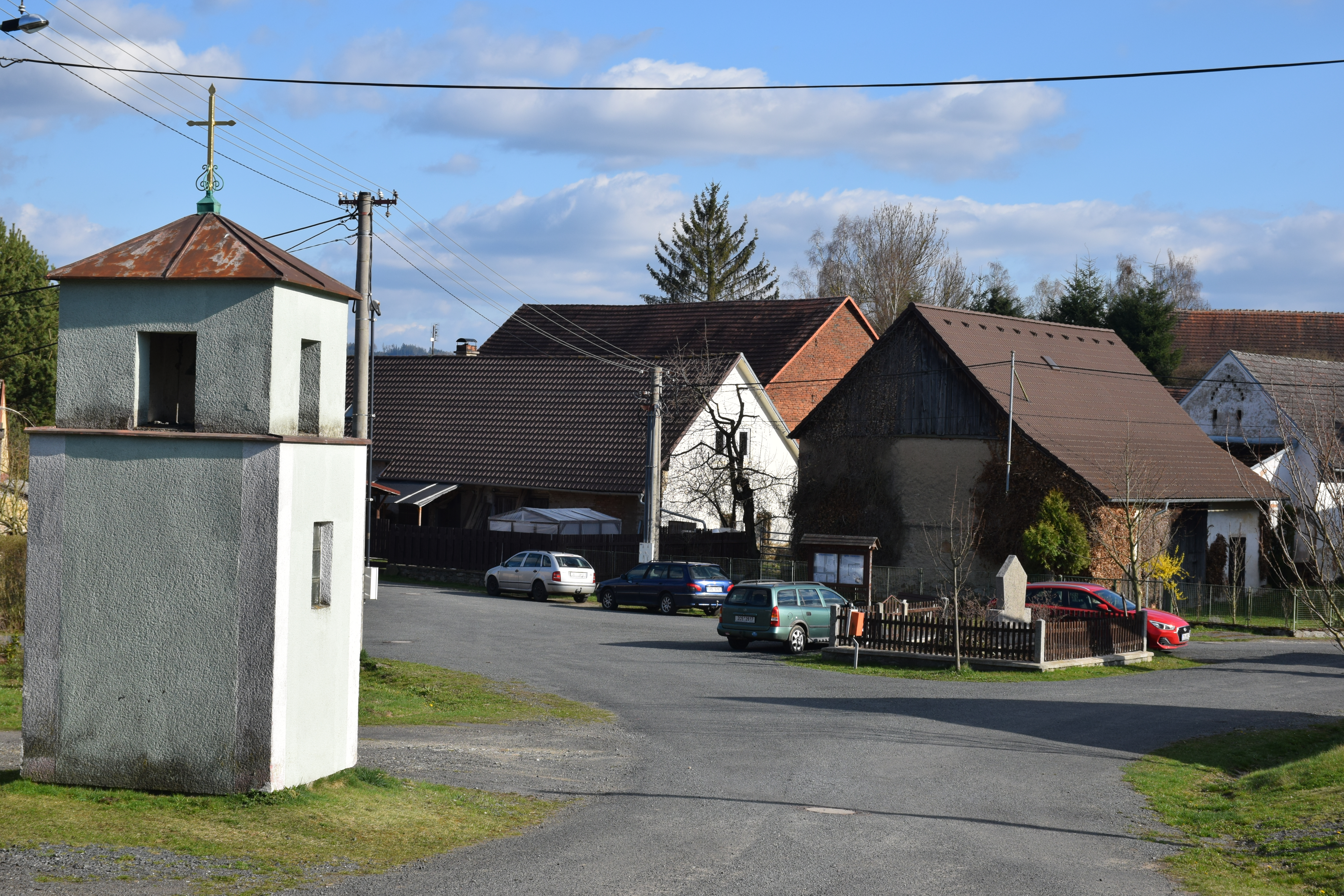
- Centre of Třebčice

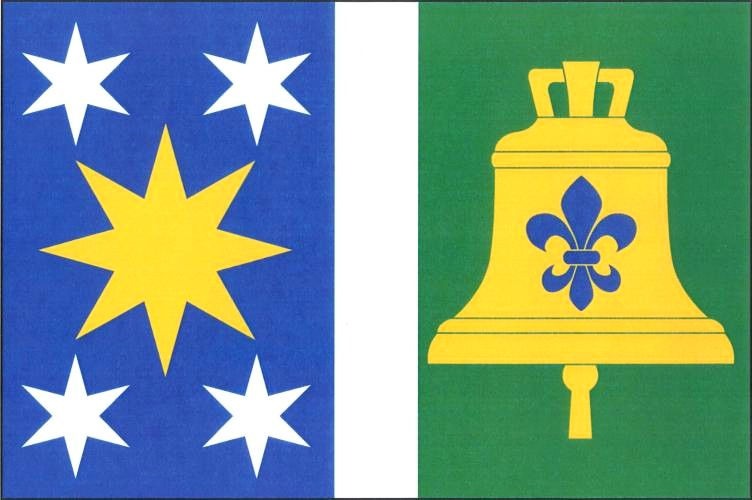
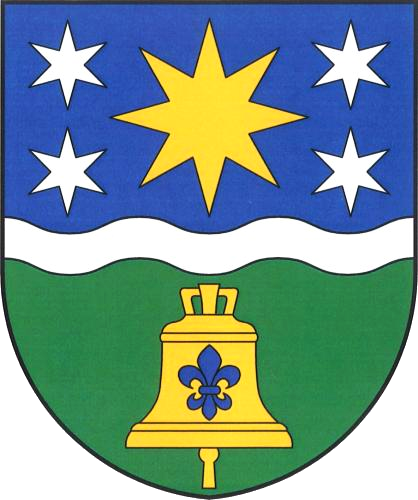
- Flag Coat of arms

- Location in the Czech Republic
- Coordinates: 49°29′0″N 13°36′44″E
- Country: Czech Republic
- Region: Plzeň
- District: Plzeň-South
- First mentioned: 1350

Area
  - Total: 2.41 km^{2} (0.93 sq mi)
- Elevation: 424 m (1,391 ft)

Population (2026-01-01)
  - Total: 107
  - Density: 44.4/km^{2} (115/sq mi)
- Time zone: UTC+1 (CET)
  - Summer (DST): UTC+2 (CEST)
- Postal code: 335 01
- Website: www.trebcice.cz

Třebčice is a municipality and village in Plzeň-South District in the Plzeň Region of the Czech Republic. It has about 100 inhabitants.

Třebčice lies approximately 35 kilometres (22 mi) south-east of Plzeň and 89 km (55 mi) south-west of Prague.

== Demographics ==
Historical population
Year	Pop.	±%
1869	181	—
1880	224	+23.8%
1890	205	−8.5%
1900	193	−5.9%
1910	201	+4.1%
1921	218	+8.5%
1930	224	+2.8%
1950	210	−6.2%
1961	185	−11.9%
1970	146	−21.1%
1980	114	−21.9%
1991	81	−28.9%
2001	63	−22.2%
2011	110	+74.6%
2021	130	+18.2%
Source: Censuses
