= Kotovice =

- Municipality
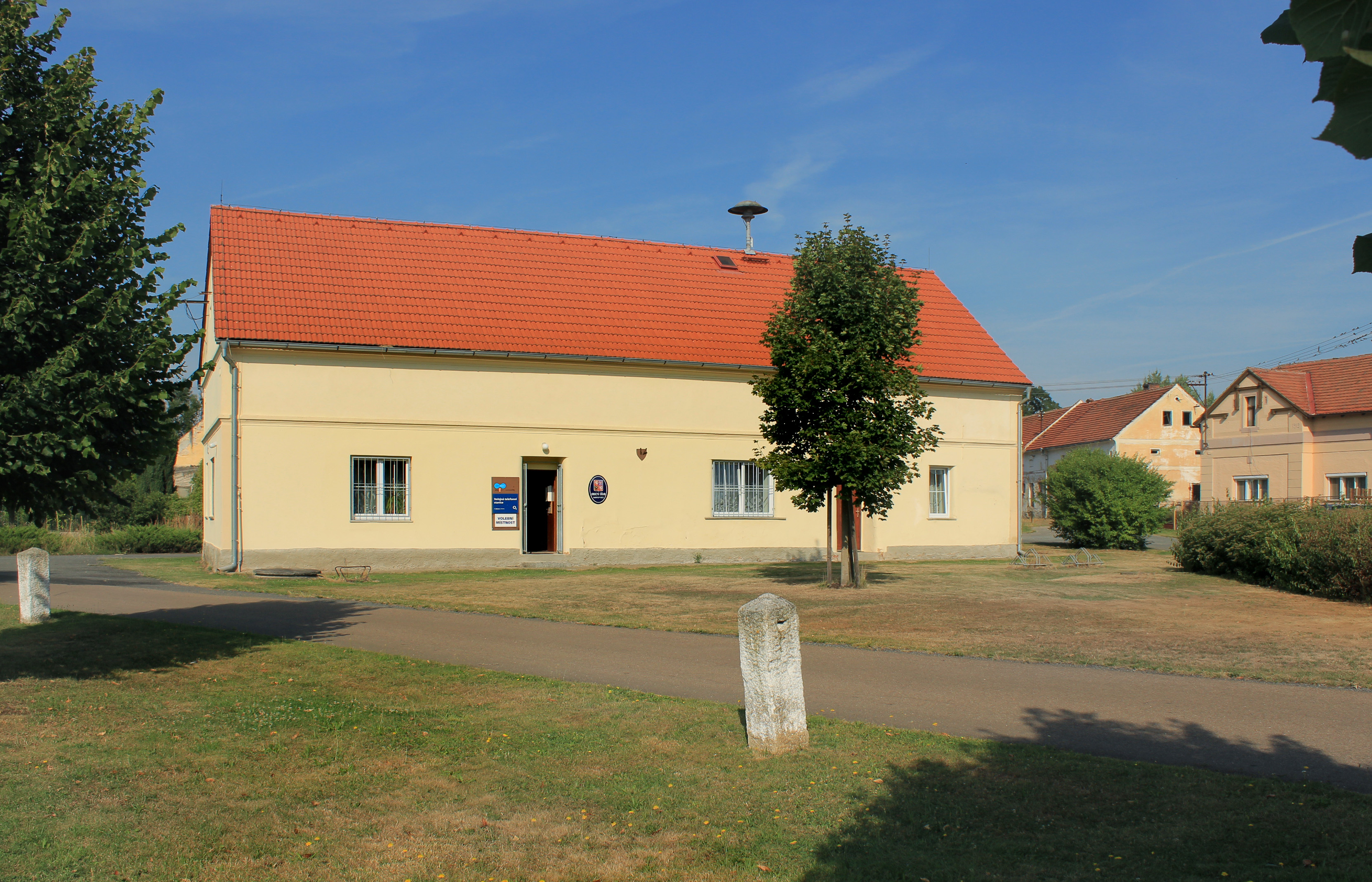
- Municipal office

- Location in the Czech Republic
- Coordinates: 49°33′5″N 13°34′2″E
- Country: Czech Republic
- Region: Plzeň
- District: Plzeň-South
- First mentioned: 1272

Area
  - Total: 9.77 km^{2} (3.77 sq mi)
- Elevation: 368 m (1,207 ft)

Population (2026-01-01)
  - Total: 294
  - Density: 30.1/km^{2} (77.9/sq mi)
- Time zone: UTC+1 (CET)
  - Summer (DST): UTC+2 (CEST)
- Postal code: 333 01
- Website: www.kotovice.cz

Kotovice is a municipality and village in Plzeň-South District in the Plzeň Region of the Czech Republic. It has about 300 inhabitants.

Kotovice lies approximately 18 kilometres (11 mi) south-west of Plzeň and 102 km (63 mi) south-west of Prague.

== Administrative division ==
Kotovice consists of three municipal parts (in brackets population according to the 2021 census):

- Kotovice (180)
- Nový (46)
- Záluží (65)

== Demographics ==
Historical population
Year	Pop.	±%
1869	384	—
1880	437	+13.8%
1890	529	+21.1%
1900	549	+3.8%
1910	609	+10.9%
1921	609	+0.0%
1930	616	+1.1%
1950	362	−41.2%
1961	416	+14.9%
1970	327	−21.4%
1980	289	−11.6%
1991	249	−13.8%
2001	264	+6.0%
2011	277	+4.9%
2021	291	+5.1%
Source: Censuses
