= Bolkov =

- Municipality
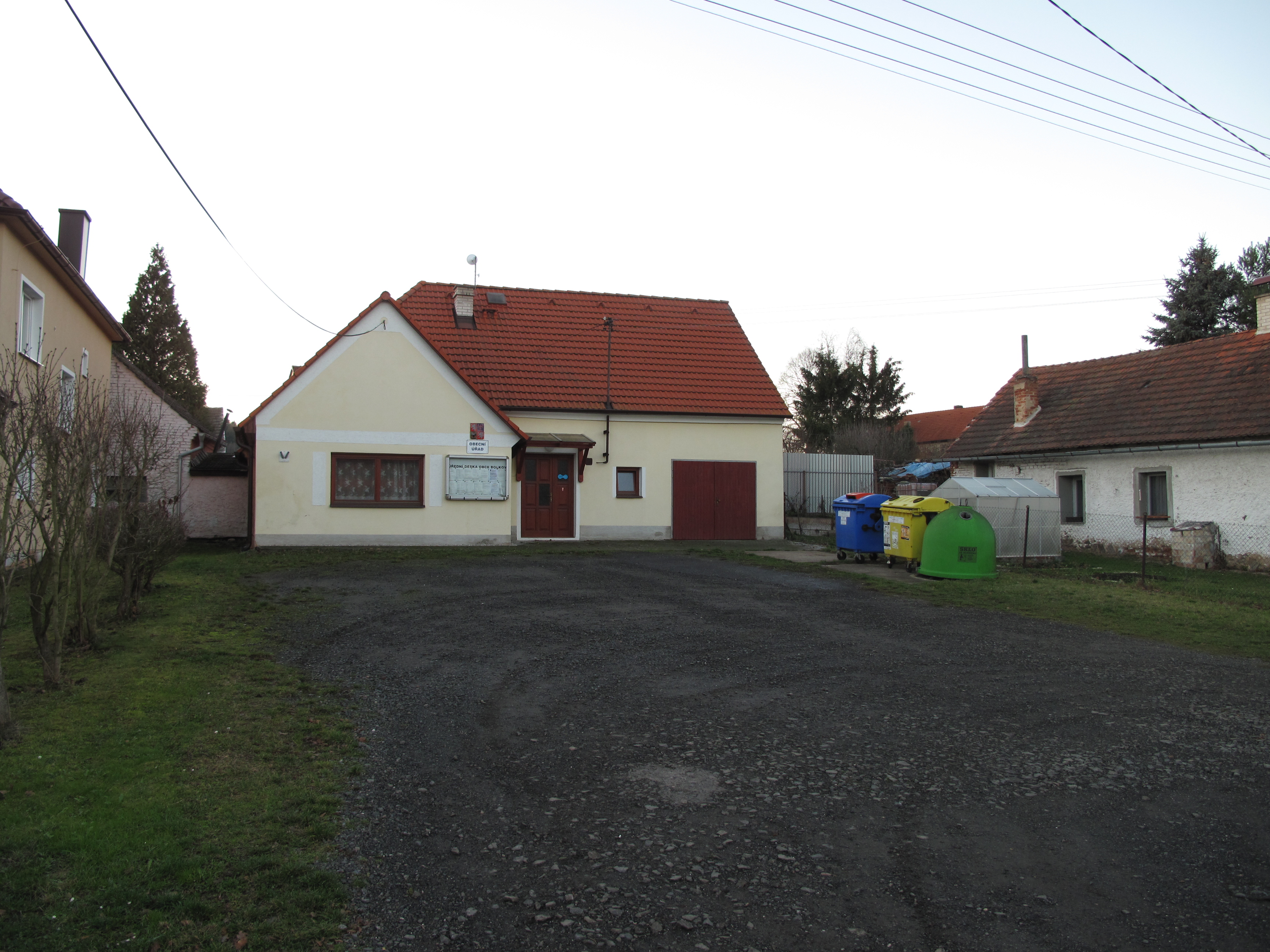
- Municipal office

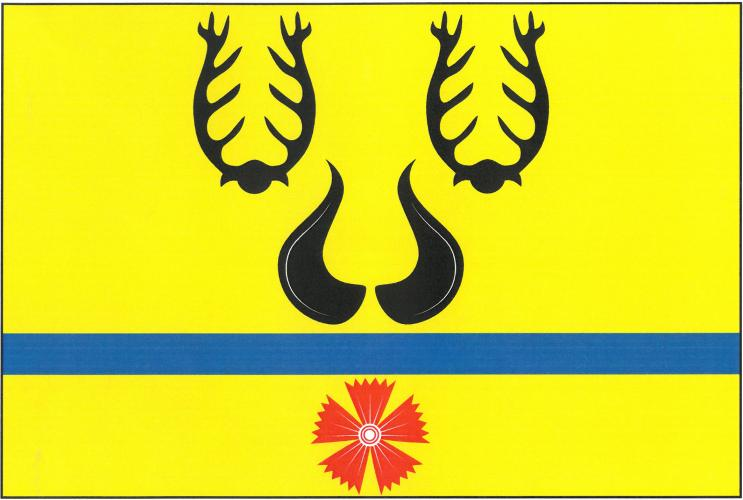
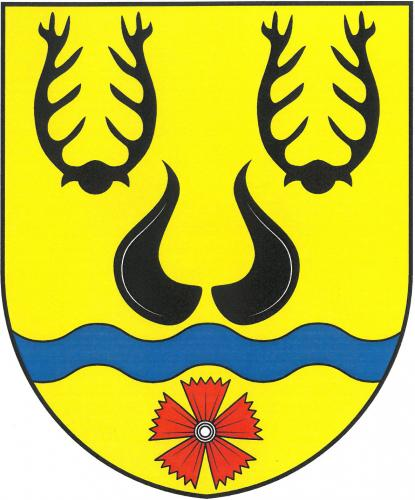
- Flag Coat of arms

- Location in the Czech Republic
- Coordinates: 49°32′1″N 13°13′26″E
- Country: Czech Republic
- Region: Plzeň
- District: Plzeň-South
- First mentioned: 1379

Area
  - Total: 1.82 km^{2} (0.70 sq mi)
- Elevation: 403 m (1,322 ft)

Population (2026-01-01)
  - Total: 59
  - Density: 32/km^{2} (84/sq mi)
- Time zone: UTC+1 (CET)
  - Summer (DST): UTC+2 (CEST)
- Postal code: 334 01
- Website: www.obec-bolkov.cz

Bolkov is a municipality and village in Plzeň-South District in the Plzeň Region of the Czech Republic. It has about 60 inhabitants.

Bolkov lies approximately 27 kilometres (17 mi) south-west of Plzeň and 106 km (66 mi) south-west of Prague.

== Demographics ==
Historical population
Year	Pop.	±%
1869	215	—
1880	227	+5.6%
1890	225	−0.9%
1900	207	−8.0%
1910	237	+14.5%
1921	229	−3.4%
1930	211	−7.9%
1950	144	−31.8%
1961	136	−5.6%
1970	127	−6.6%
1980	111	−12.6%
1991	61	−45.0%
2001	54	−11.5%
2011	61	+13.0%
2021	62	+1.6%
Source: Censuses
