= Skašov =

- Municipality
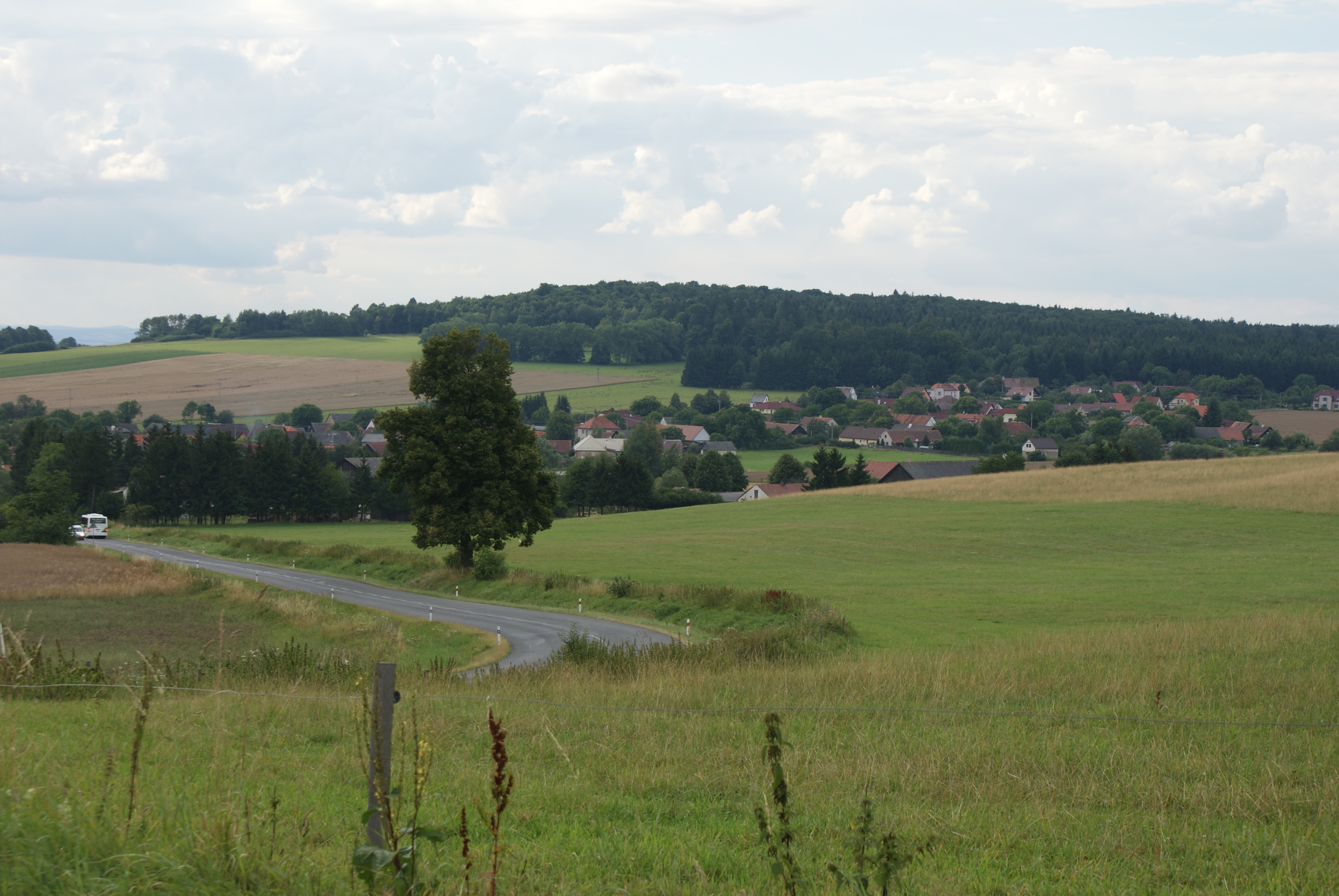
- General view

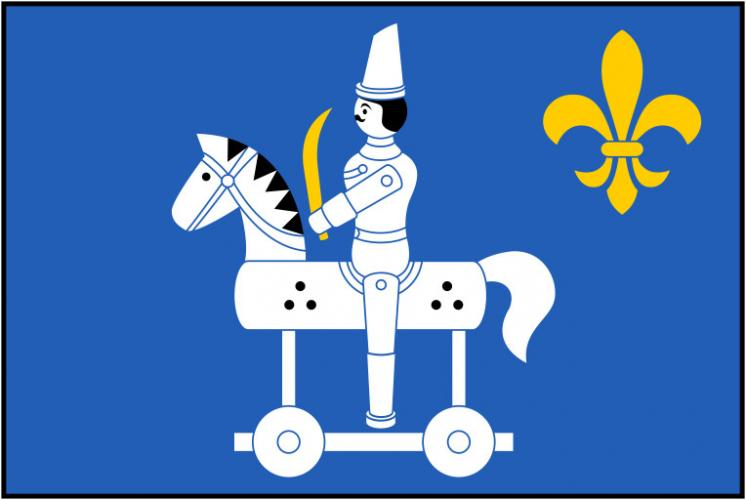
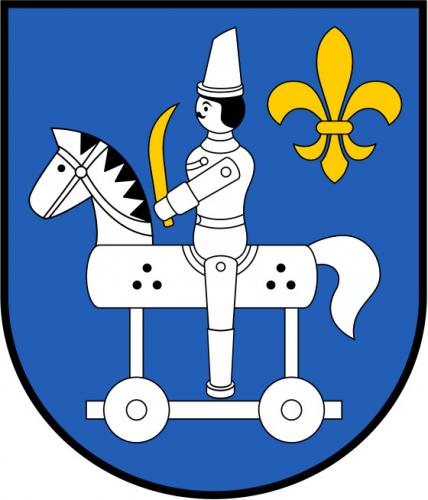
- Flag Coat of arms

- Location in the Czech Republic
- Coordinates: 49°30′38″N 13°25′53″E
- Country: Czech Republic
- Region: Plzeň
- District: Plzeň-South
- First mentioned: 1326

Area
  - Total: 7.22 km^{2} (2.79 sq mi)
- Elevation: 513 m (1,683 ft)

Population (2026-01-01)
  - Total: 224
  - Density: 31.0/km^{2} (80.4/sq mi)
- Time zone: UTC+1 (CET)
  - Summer (DST): UTC+2 (CEST)
- Postal code: 336 01
- Website: www.skasov.cz

Skašov is a municipality and village in Plzeň-South District in the Plzeň Region of the Czech Republic. It has about 200 inhabitants.

Skašov lies approximately 27 kilometres (17 mi) south of Plzeň and 96 km (60 mi) south-west of Prague.

== Demographics ==
Historical population
Year	Pop.	±%
1869	540	—
1880	653	+20.9%
1890	544	−16.7%
1900	518	−4.8%
1910	581	+12.2%
1921	536	−7.7%
1930	493	−8.0%
1950	405	−17.8%
1961	393	−3.0%
1970	320	−18.6%
1980	270	−15.6%
1991	250	−7.4%
2001	228	−8.8%
2011	236	+3.5%
2021	206	−12.7%
Source: Censuses
