= Honezovice =

- Municipality
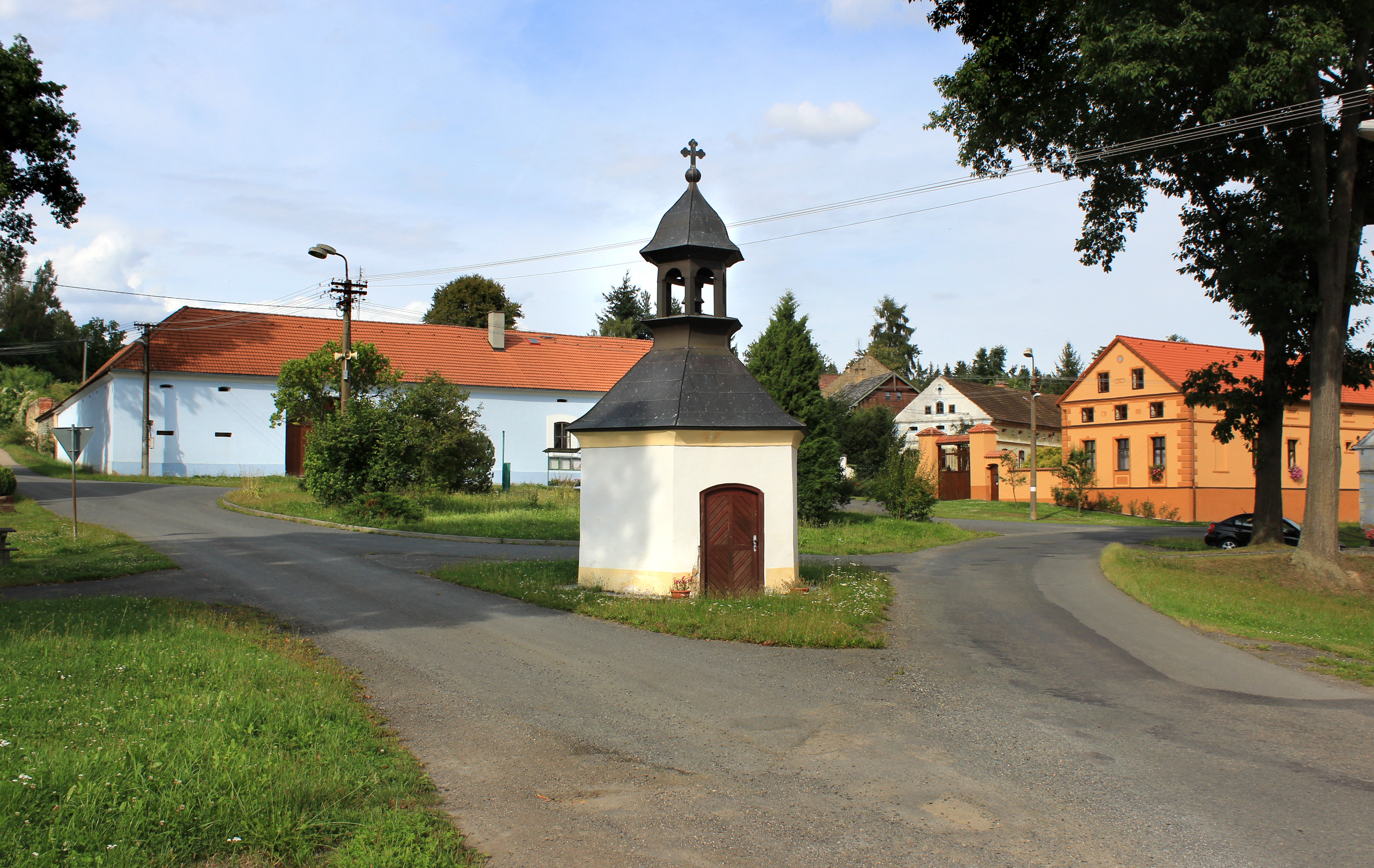
- Hradišťany, a part of Honezovice

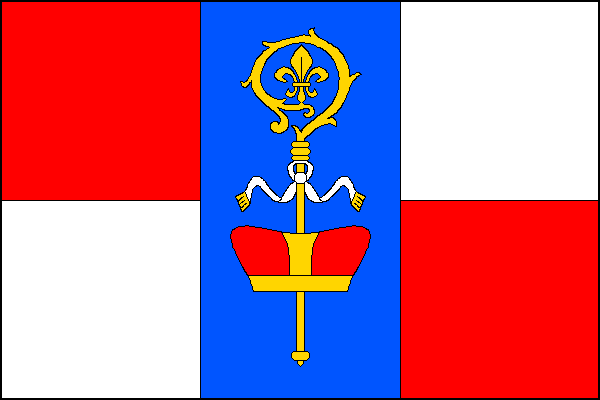
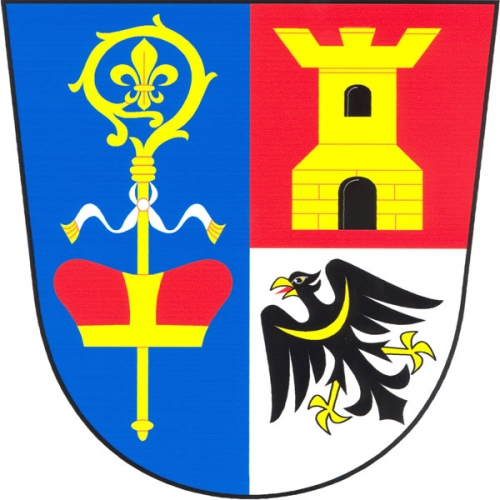
- Flag Coat of arms

- Location in the Czech Republic
- Coordinates: 49°38′18″N 13°3′45″E
- Country: Czech Republic
- Region: Plzeň
- District: Plzeň-South
- First mentioned: 1115

Area
  - Total: 18.03 km^{2} (6.96 sq mi)
- Elevation: 390 m (1,280 ft)

Population (2026-01-01)
  - Total: 294
  - Density: 16.3/km^{2} (42.2/sq mi)
- Time zone: UTC+1 (CET)
  - Summer (DST): UTC+2 (CEST)
- Postal code: 333 01
- Website: www.honezovice.cz

Honezovice is a municipality and village in Plzeň-South District in the Plzeň Region of the Czech Republic. It has about 300 inhabitants.

Honezovice lies approximately 26 kilometres (16 mi) south-west of Plzeň and 110 km (68 mi) south-west of Prague.

== Administrative division ==
Honezovice consists of two municipal parts (in brackets population according to the 2021 census):

- Honezovice (210)
- Hradišťany (45)

== Demographics ==
Historical population
Year	Pop.	±%
1869	648	—
1880	643	−0.8%
1890	649	+0.9%
1900	672	+3.5%
1910	753	+12.1%
1921	748	−0.7%
1930	794	+6.1%
1950	448	−43.6%
1961	413	−7.8%
1970	349	−15.5%
1980	272	−22.1%
1991	255	−6.2%
2001	224	−12.2%
2011	224	+0.0%
2021	255	+13.8%
Source: Censuses
