= Myslív =

- Municipality
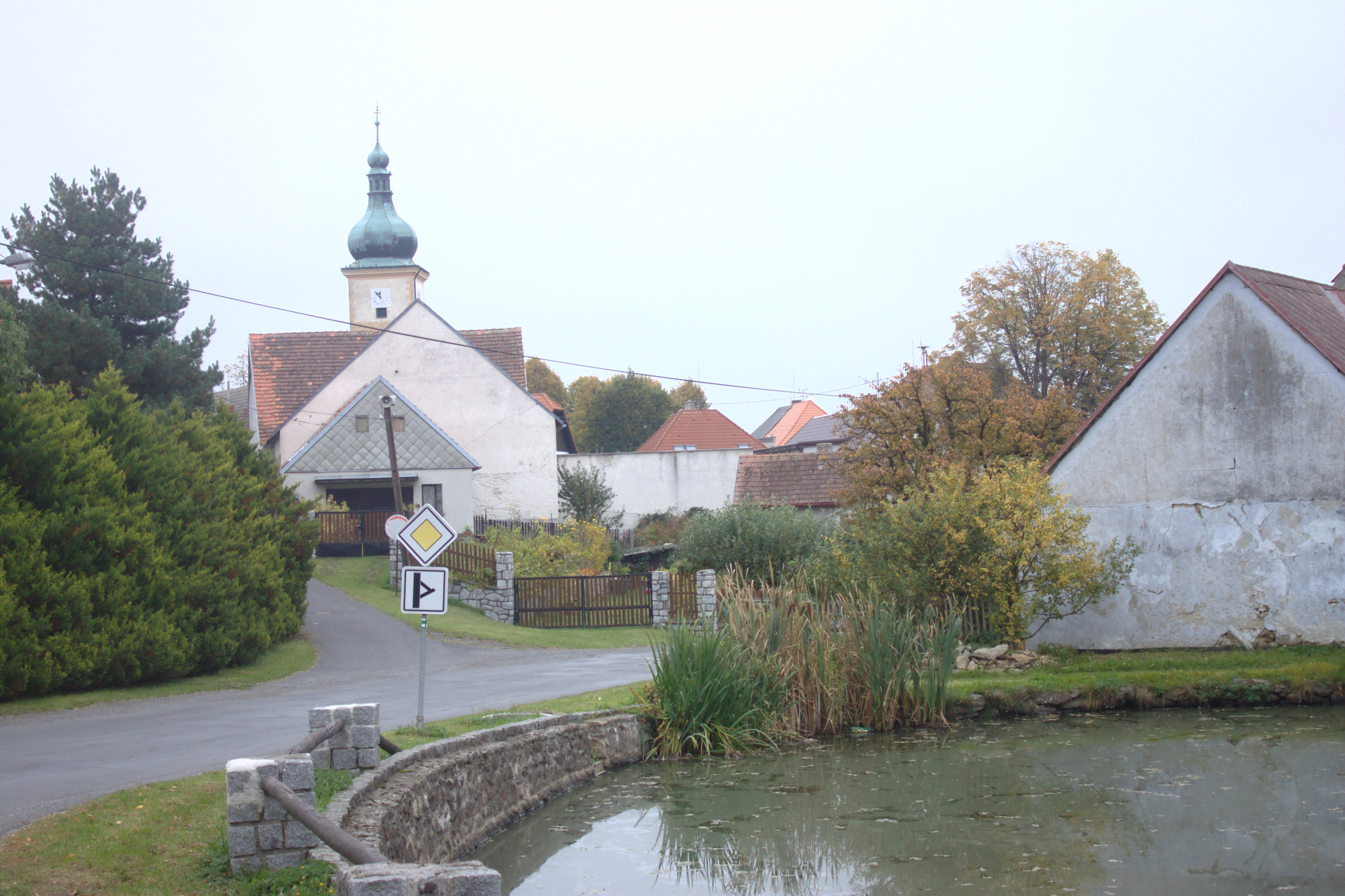
- Pond and the main road

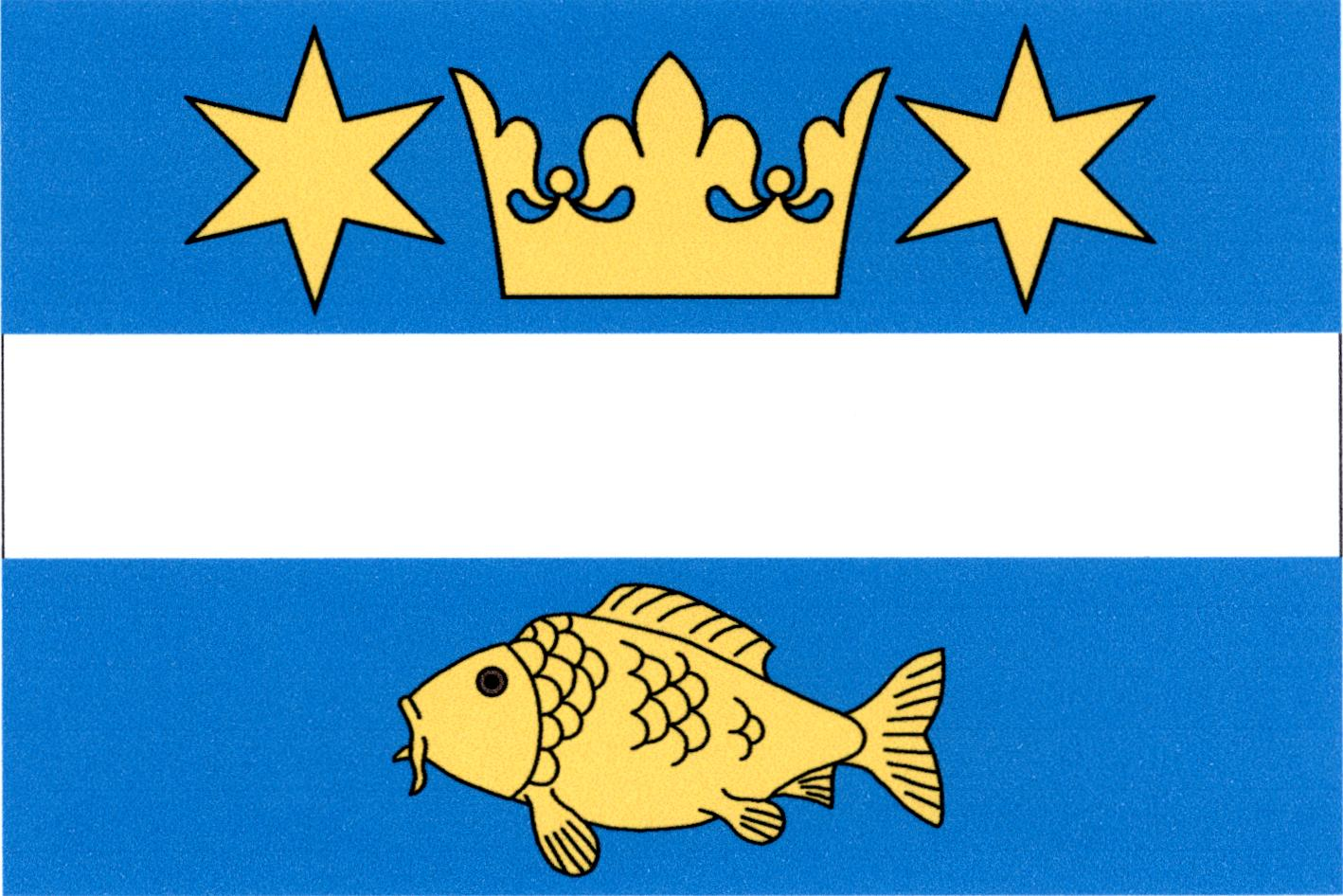
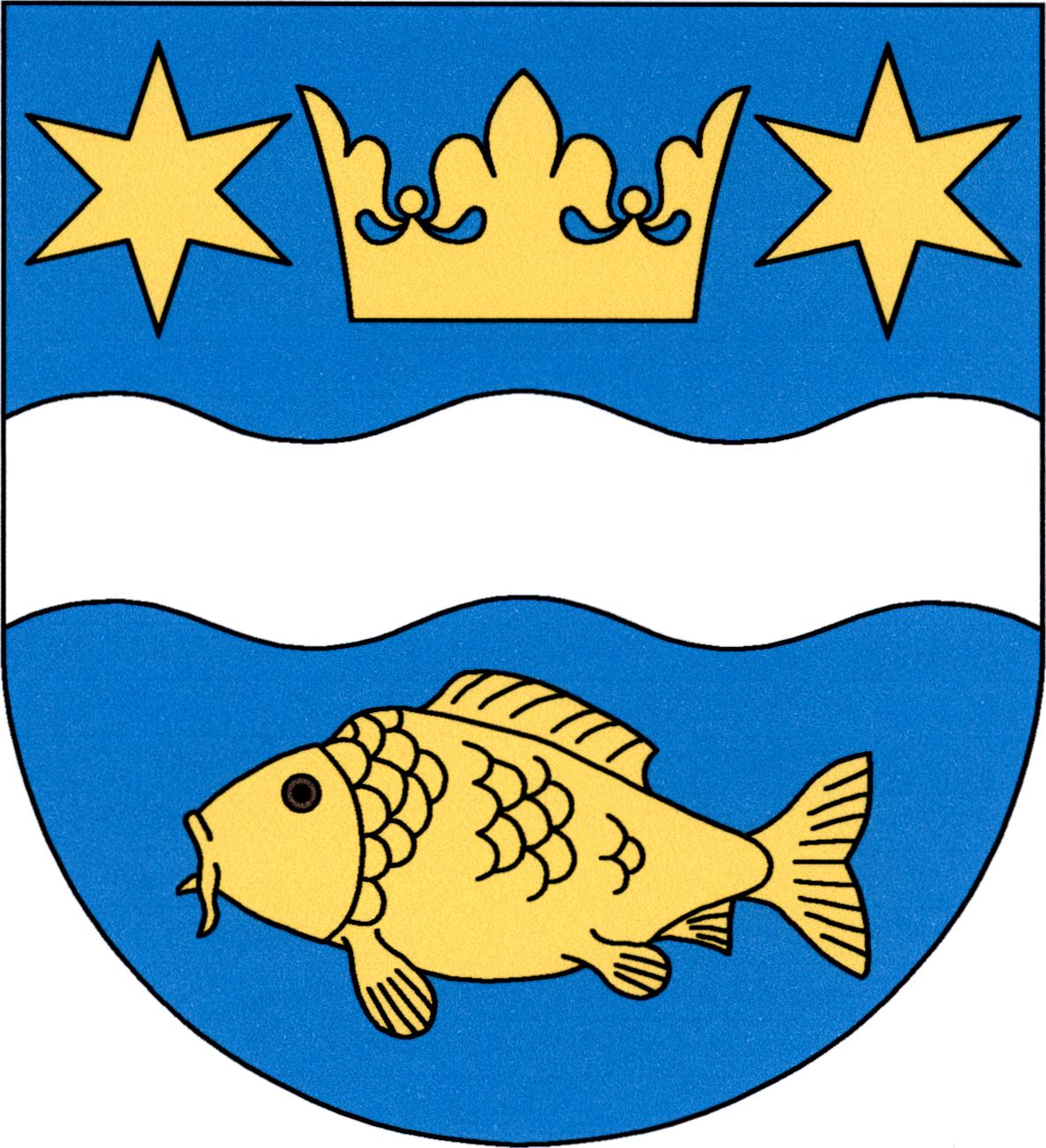
- Flag Coat of arms

- Location in the Czech Republic
- Coordinates: 49°24′51″N 13°34′21″E
- Country: Czech Republic
- Region: Plzeň
- District: Klatovy
- First mentioned: 1352

Area
  - Total: 15.74 km^{2} (6.08 sq mi)
- Elevation: 583 m (1,913 ft)

Population (2026-01-01)
  - Total: 423
  - Density: 26.9/km^{2} (69.6/sq mi)
- Time zone: UTC+1 (CET)
  - Summer (DST): UTC+2 (CEST)
- Postal code: 341 01
- Website: www.obecmysliv.cz

Myslív is a municipality and village in Klatovy District in the Plzeň Region of the Czech Republic. It has about 400 inhabitants.

== Administrative division ==
Myslív consists of four municipal parts (in brackets population according to the 2021 census):

- Myslív (248)
- Loužná (47)
- Milčice (102)
- Nový Dvůr (9)

== Etymology ==
The name is derived from the personal name Myslej, meaning "Myslej's (court)". The first written record of the village lists it as Myslewa.

== Geography ==
Myslív is located about 20 kilometres (12 mi) east of Klatovy and 37 km (23 mi) south of Plzeň. It lies in the Blatná Uplands. The highest point is the Vráž hill at 616 m (2,021 ft) above sea level. The stream Myslívský potok flows across the municipality. There are several fishponds in the territory; the largest of them is Myslívský.

== History ==
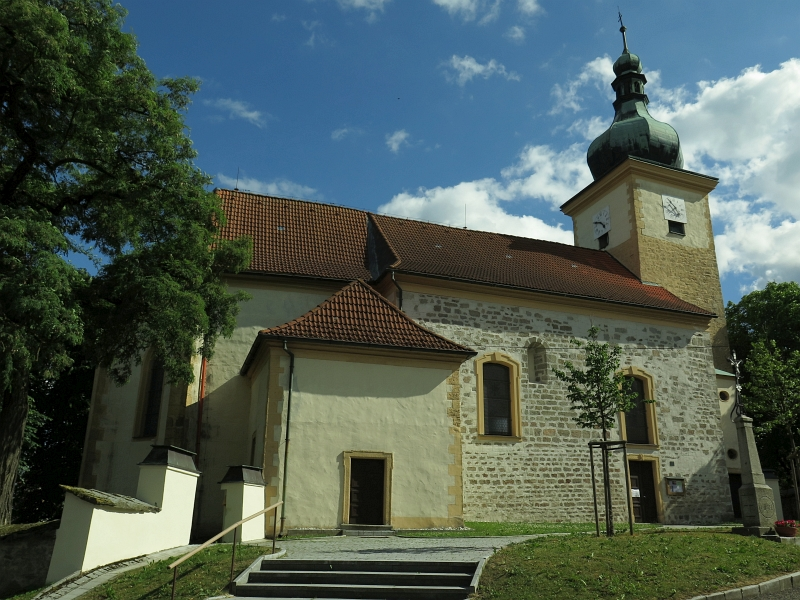
Church of the Assumption of the Virgin Mary

The first written mention of Myslív is from 1352. The village was probably founded by the Cistercian monks from the nearby monastery of Pomuk, shortly after the monastery was established. In Vráž hill near Myslív, the monks opened gold mines. The Church of the Assumption of the Virgin Mary was first documented in 1384 and for several hundred years, it served as the parish church. After the monastery was burned down by the Hussites in 1420, the gold mines ceased to exist and Myslív became part of the Zelená Hora estate.

The first written mention of Milčice is from 1551, when it was abolished in its original site and rebuilt by a nearby hill. A large pond was created in its original site in 1608. Loužná was first mentioned in 1558.

From 1584, the area was owned by the Sternberg family. In 1630, during the Thirty Years' War, the territory was bought by the Martinic family and became part of Plánice. Because of the war, the Habsburg monarchy led efforts of re-Catholicisation and Germanisation of the Czech lands. Since at least 1643, Myslív's church has kept vital records of its member villages, used to document and verify baptisms and marriages as Catholic rather than Protestant. In 1790, the Wallis family acquired the estate and it remained in their possession until the 1920s, when the Schaffgotsch family acquired the land after the land reform.

From the revolution in 1848, Myslív, Loužná and Milčice were separate municipalities, and Nový Dvůr was a hamlet administered by Myslív. In 1975, Loužná was merged with Myslív, and Milčice was merged with Kovčín. In 1976, Kovčín, Milčice and Nehodiv were incorporated into the Myslív municipality. Since 1 January 1992, Kovčín and Nehodiv have been separate municipalities again.

== Demographics ==
Historical population

| Year | Pop. | ±% |
|---|---|---|
| 1869 | 1,211 | — |
| 1880 | 1,168 | −3.6% |
| 1890 | 1,135 | −2.8% |
| 1900 | 1,070 | −5.7% |
| 1910 | 1,101 | +2.9% |

| Year | Pop. | ±% |
|---|---|---|
| 1921 | 1,133 | +2.9% |
| 1930 | 1,015 | −10.4% |
| 1950 | 770 | −24.1% |
| 1961 | 763 | −0.9% |
| 1970 | 659 | −13.6% |

| Year | Pop. | ±% |
|---|---|---|
| 1980 | 626 | −5.0% |
| 1991 | 559 | −10.7% |
| 2001 | 471 | −15.7% |
| 2011 | 418 | −11.3% |
| 2021 | 406 | −2.9% |

Source: Censuses

== Transport ==
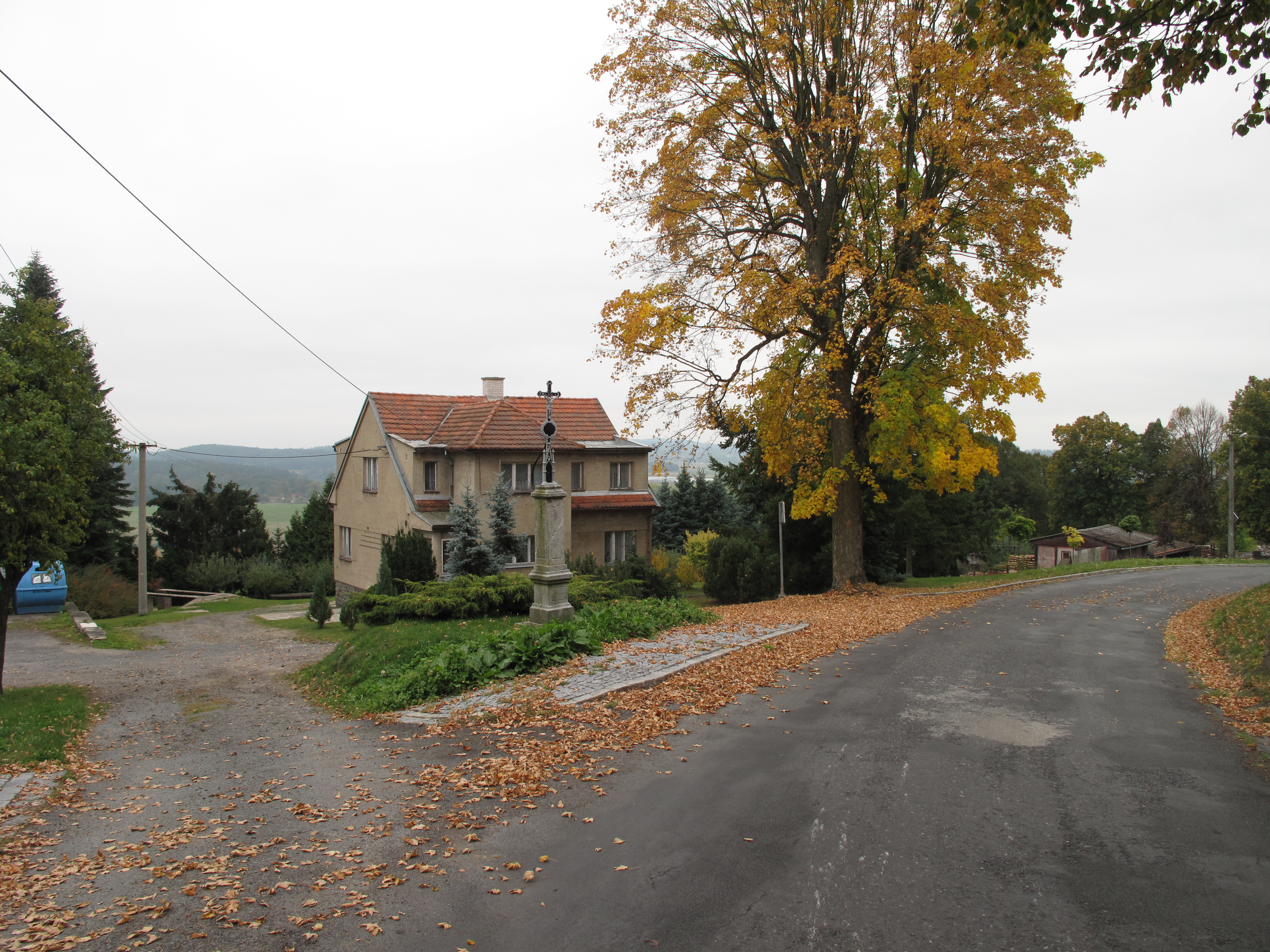
Centre of Myslív

The railway line Plzeň–Horažďovice runs through the eastern tip of the municipality, but there is no train stop. Myslív is served by the stop in neighbouring Kovčín.

== Sights ==
The main landmark of Myslív is the Church of the Assumption of the Virgin Mary. It was originally a Romanesque building from the late 12th century. Between 1220 and 1240, Gothic presbytery and sacristy were added. The church was baroque rebuilt around 1730, but retained the Romanesque-Gothic core.

The rectory opposite the church is a baroque building from the first third of the 18th century with older core, also protected as a cultural monument.

The Chapel of Saint Joseph in Milčice dates from 1893. The Chapel of Our Lady the Queen in Loužná was built in 1920.
