= Studeněves =

- Municipality
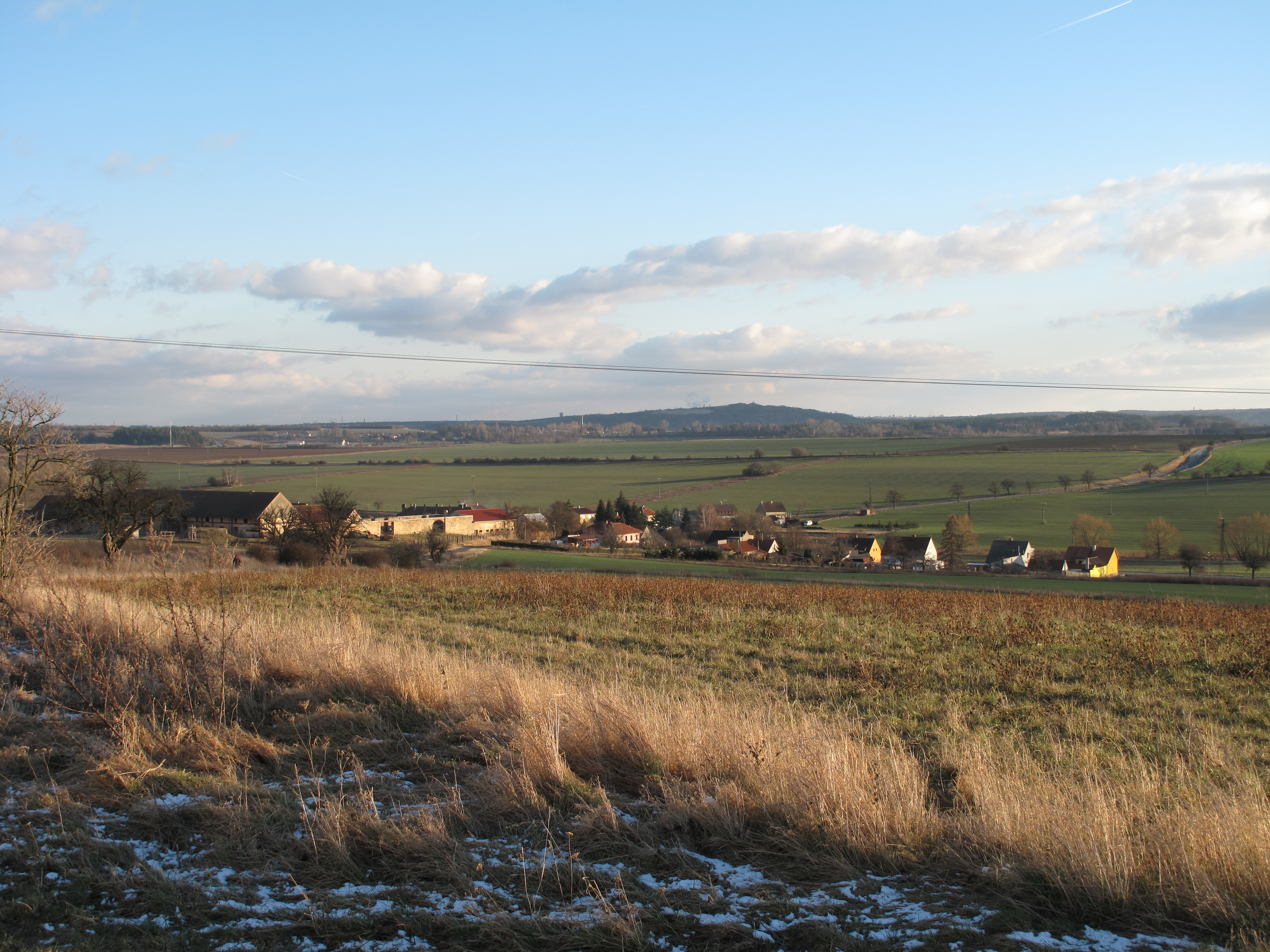
- View from the north

- Location in the Czech Republic
- Coordinates: 50°13′27″N 14°2′40″E
- Country: Czech Republic
- Region: Central Bohemian
- District: Kladno
- First mentioned: 1372

Area
  - Total: 2.68 km^{2} (1.03 sq mi)
- Elevation: 286 m (938 ft)

Population (2026-01-01)
  - Total: 522
  - Density: 195/km^{2} (504/sq mi)
- Time zone: UTC+1 (CET)
  - Summer (DST): UTC+2 (CEST)
- Postal code: 273 79
- Website: www.studeneves.cz

Studeněves is a municipality and village in Kladno District in the Central Bohemian Region of the Czech Republic. It has about 500 inhabitants.

== Etymology ==
The name is derived from the personal name Studen, meaning "Studen's village". The initial name of the village was Studena ves.

== Geography ==
Studeněves is located about 10 kilometres (6 mi) north of Kladno and 26 km (16 mi) northwest of Prague. It lies in a flat agricultural landscape in the Prague Plateau. The highest point is at 331 m (1,086 ft) above sea level.

== History ==
The first written mention of Studeněves is from 1372. Until 1623, the village was owned by various lesser noblemen. In 1623, Studeněves was annexed to the Smečno estate, owned by the Martinic family. After that, the local fortress lost its purpose and was converted into a granary in the 18th century. In the 19th century, there was a large sugar factory in Studeněves, but it ceased to exist in 1929 as a result of the Great Depression.

== Demographics ==
Historical population

Year	Pop.	±%
1869	240	—
1880	235	−2.1%
1890	276	+17.4%
1900	268	−2.9%
1910	244	−9.0%

Year	Pop.	±%
1921	258	+5.7%
1930	373	+44.6%
1950	328	−12.1%
1961	397	+21.0%
1970	377	−5.0%

Year	Pop.	±%
1980	349	−7.4%
1991	301	−13.8%
2001	303	+0.7%
2011	468	+54.5%
2021	485	+3.6%

Source: Censuses

== Transport ==
The I/7 road, which replaces the unfinished section of the D7 motorway from Prague to Chomutov, runs along the eastern municipal border. The I/16 road, which connects the D6 motorway with Slaný, runs along the northern municipal border.

== Sights ==
The only protected cultural monument in the municipality is a small chapel from the second half of the 18th century.
