= Rynholec =

- Municipality
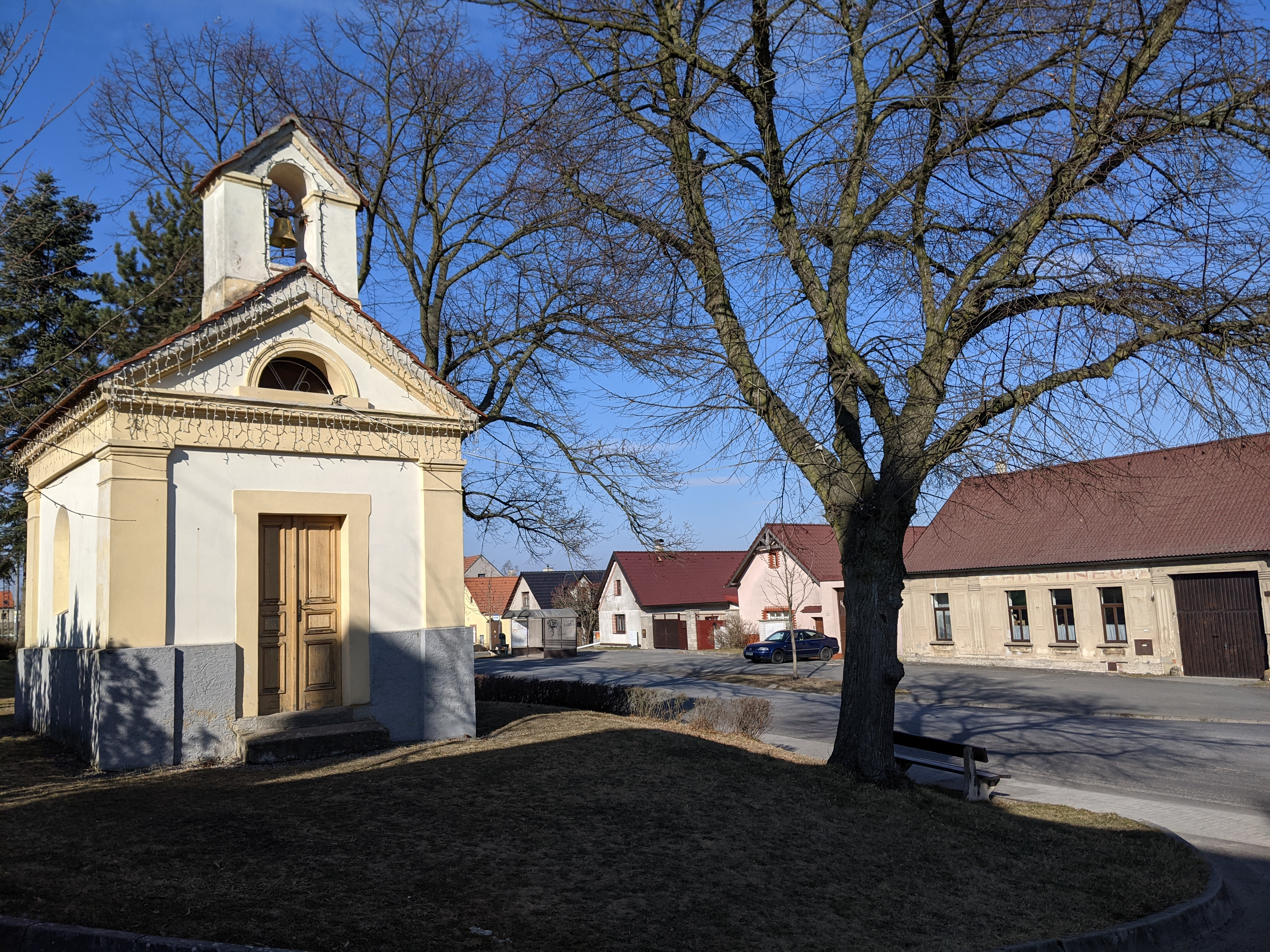
- Centre of Rynholec

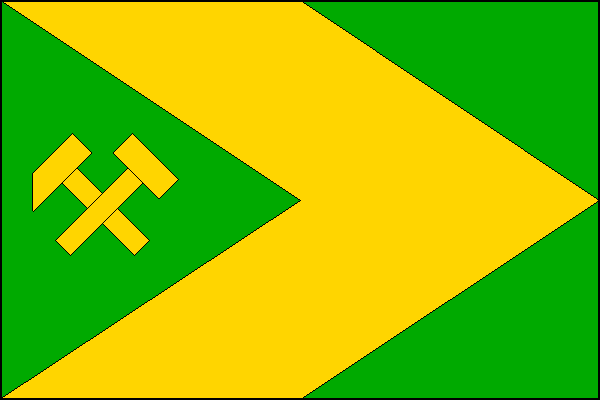
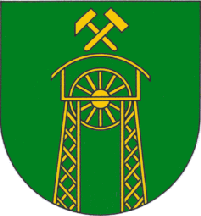
- Flag Coat of arms

- Location in the Czech Republic
- Coordinates: 50°8′17″N 13°55′20″E
- Country: Czech Republic
- Region: Central Bohemian
- District: Rakovník
- First mentioned: 1330

Area
  - Total: 6.09 km^{2} (2.35 sq mi)
- Elevation: 467 m (1,532 ft)

Population (2026-01-01)
  - Total: 1,097
  - Density: 180/km^{2} (467/sq mi)
- Time zone: UTC+1 (CET)
  - Summer (DST): UTC+2 (CEST)
- Postal code: 270 62
- Website: www.obecrynholec.cz

Rynholec is a municipality and village in Rakovník District in the Central Bohemian Region of the Czech Republic. It has about 1,100 inhabitants.

== Etymology ==
The name was probably derived from the personal name Ryn(h)olt.

== Geography ==
Rynholec is located about 14 kilometres (9 mi) northeast of Rakovník, 12 km (7 mi) west of Kladno and 31 km (19 mi) west of Prague. It lies on the border between the Džbán range and Křivoklát Highlands. The highest point is at 505 m (1,657 ft) above sea level.

== History ==
The first written mention of Rynholec is from 1330. The village was founded in the 13th or at the beginning of the 14th century. Until 1466, the owners of Rynholec often changed and included various lesser noblemen. From 1466, the village was ruled by the Martinic family as part of the Smečno estate.

== Demographics ==
Historical population

Year	Pop.	±%
1869	1,271	—
1880	637	−49.9%
1890	613	−3.8%
1900	672	+9.6%
1910	1,021	+51.9%

Year	Pop.	±%
1921	1,487	+45.6%
1930	1,509	+1.5%
1950	1,863	+23.5%
1961	1,296	−30.4%
1970	1,157	−10.7%

Year	Pop.	±%
1980	974	−15.8%
1991	623	−36.0%
2001	687	+10.3%
2011	844	+22.9%
2021	1,012	+19.9%

Source: Censuses

== Economy ==
In the western part of the municipality is a fire clay quarry. Extraction and processing of this material began here in 1908.

== Transport ==
Rynholec is located on the railway line Kladno–Rakovník.

== Sights ==
The only protected cultural monuments in the municipality are a rural house from the first half of the 19th century and an archaeological site of a former medieval fortress called Sobín. A landmark in the centre of the village is the Chapel of Saint Isidore.
