= Mysliv =

Mysliv or Myslív may refer to:

- Myslív, a municipality and village in the Czech Republic
- Mysliv, a village in Kalush Raion, Ukraine
