= Loužná =

- Village
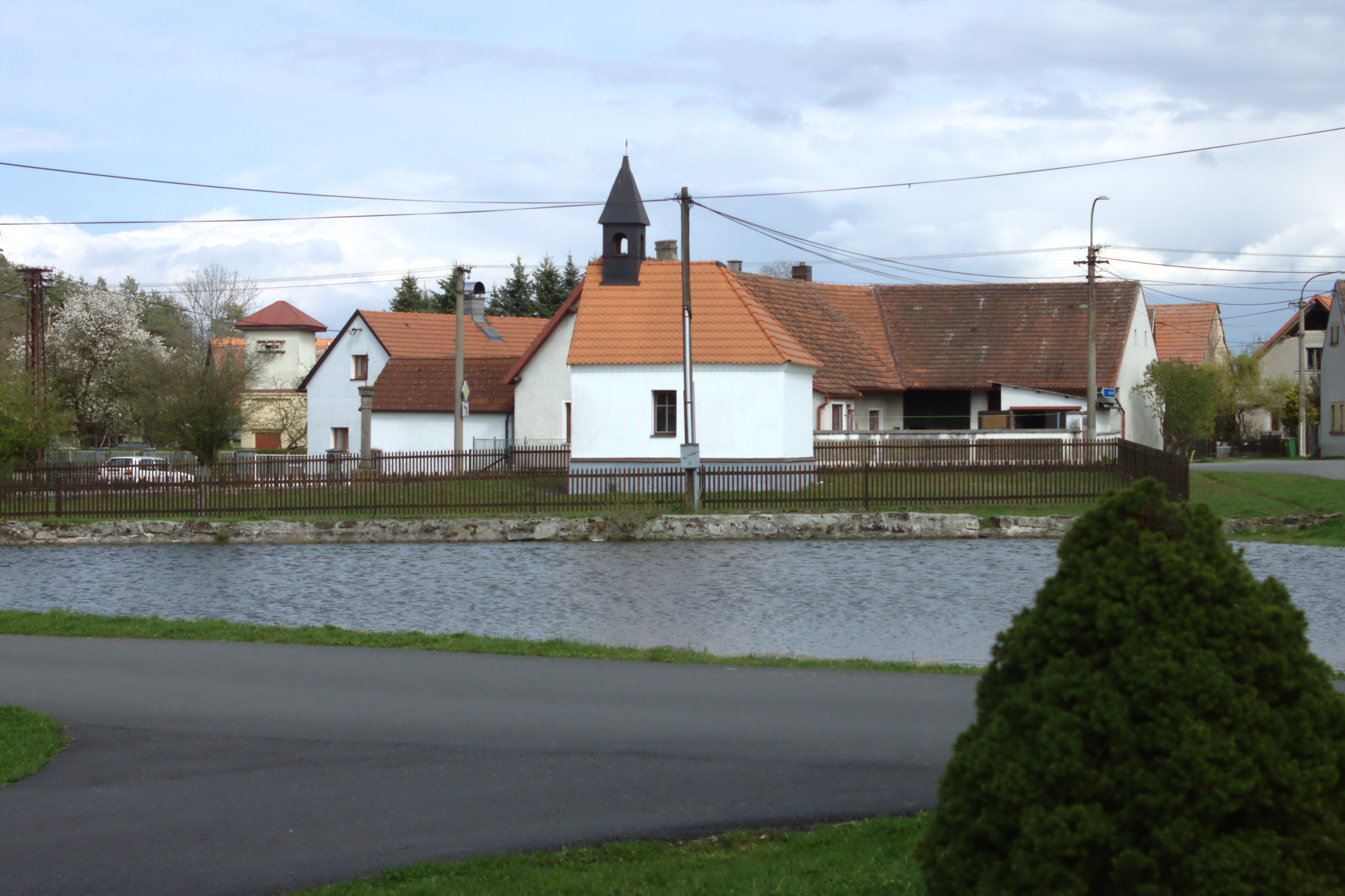

- Location within Czech Republic
- Coordinates: 49°23′49″N 13°34′5″E
- Country: Czech Republic
- Region: Plzeň
- District: Klatovy

Area
  - Total: 3.59 km^{2} (1.39 sq mi)
- Elevation: 553 m (1,814 ft)

Population (2011)
  - Total: 46
  - Density: 13/km^{2} (33/sq mi)
- Postal code: 341 01
- Website: http://www.obecmysliv.cz/

Loužná is a village and administrative part of Myslív in Klatovy District in the Plzeň Region of the Czech Republic. In 2011, 46 people lived here permanently. It is also a cadastral territory with an area of 3.59 km^{2}.

== History ==
The first written mention of Loužná dates back to 1558 when the village is listed in the property of Adam of Sternberg. The village was a part of the Zelenohorské and then a plan estate, owned by the Šternberks and later Martinice. No information is known about the establishment of the village, but it is likely to be related to the operation of the Cistercian monastery under Zelena Hora.

The name Loužná means a floodplain village (ie a village lying near a puddle, "lúžě"). Old Czech dictionaries do not accurately reflect the word "lúžě", but it seems that the word also referred to a slightly larger water surface than the word puddle, pool. In the past, the name of the village was recorded in the form: Lauzna, Laucžna or Lauschna.

The village has two parts: Stankovy (no. 28 to the north) and Loužná (no. 11 to the south). On the map of the first military survey from the 1860s the village is captured without the later part of Stankovy. At that time, the individual houses were situated practically only around a relatively large village square, on which a large cross was drawn, which preceded the local chapel, and a small pond. Part of Stankovy began to be built in the first half of the 19th century.

At present, Loužná is an integrated municipality of Myslív.

=== Chapel of the Virgin Mary Queen ===
The chapel on the village square in Loužná was built in 1920. It is dedicated to the Virgin Mary Queen and the pilgrimage is celebrated here on the first Sunday after 24 August. It's rectangular in shape, the roof is covered with tiles. In the 1970s a major repair of the interior of the chapel was made and was plastered from the outside. In 2009–2010 the chapel acquired a new roof and a copper bell tower. In front of the chapel stands a monument to the fallen soldiers of the world wars, which was in 2011 replaced by a new granite monument and a new plaque.

=== Immigration to America ===
So far, about 71 people born in Loužná have been identified as immigrating to America, sorted and profiled on FamilySearch. The earliest was probably Vaclav Sabek, who immigrated to Baltimore in 1870. He was soon followed by Anna Smolikova, who immigrated with her new husband Frantisek Duspiva in 1870 to St. Louis, Missouri, finally settling in Fayette County, Illinois.

== V Morávkách Nature Reserve ==
Behind the village in the direction of Strážovice is a former pasture with a number of protected and endangered plant species: arnica, gentian gentian, early gentian, marsh orchid, two-leaved saxifrage and forkling. It is the V Morávkách Nature Reserve.

== Luhanův mlýn ==
Luhanův mlýn with a pond is not far from the village. Since 1870 the mill belonged to František and Anna Melichar. Around 1900 the miller Petr Mareš was sitting on the mill and this surname remained connected with the mill until the 1970s. It grinded even during the war. After 1948 the mill served as a feed store. Now it is listed as a holiday house. In the middle of the last century, the pond at the mill was filled, it was named Luhanův.

== L. Stehlík and Loužná ==
It is known from the stories of witnesses that Ladislav Stehlík often visited the "U Čistotů" building No. 45 here today.
