= Milčice (Myslív) =

- Village
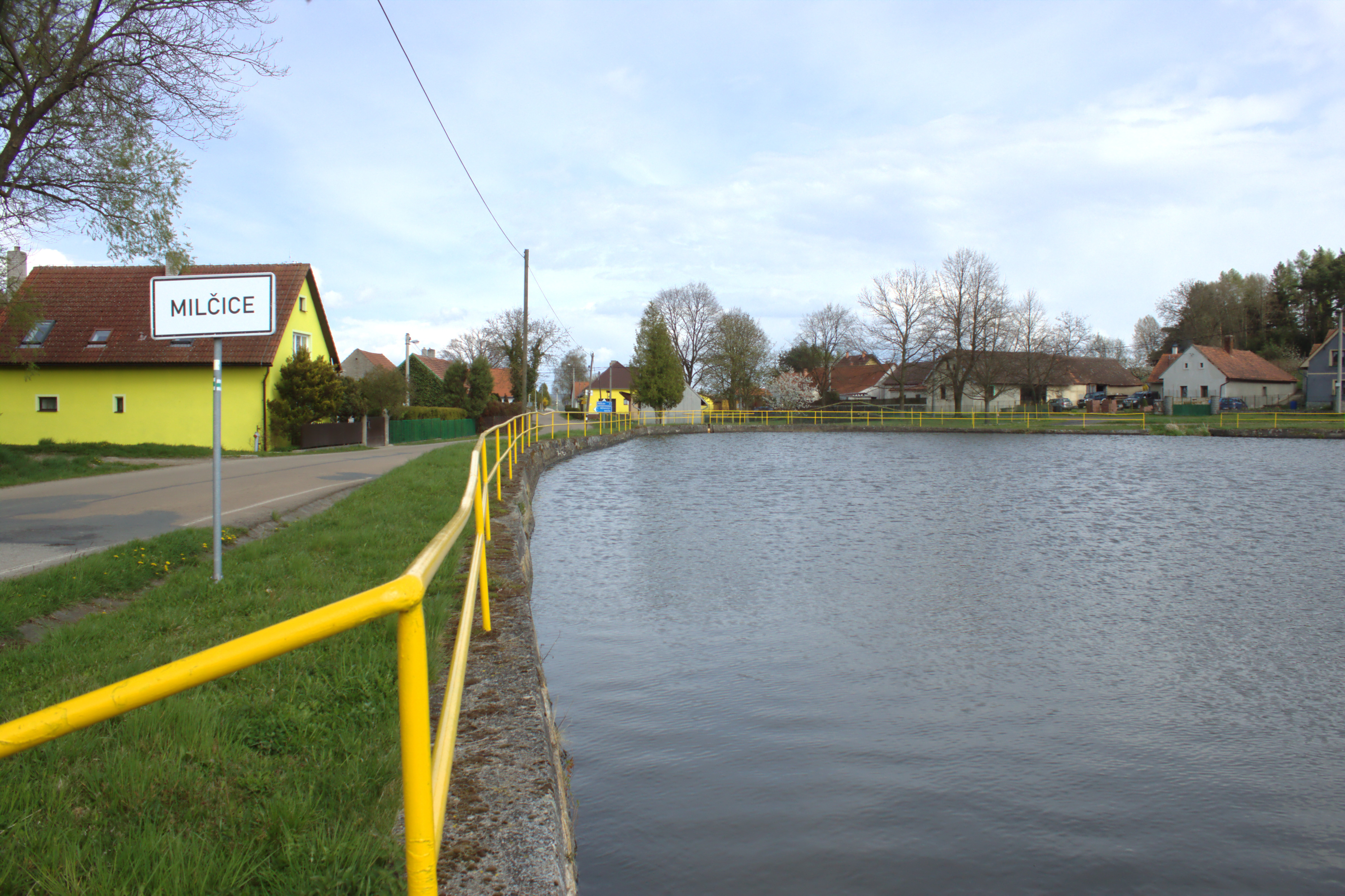

- Location within Czech Republic
- Coordinates: 49°24′33″N 13°36′19″E
- Country: Czech Republic
- Region: Plzeň
- District: Klatovy

Area
  - Total: 4.28 km^{2} (1.65 sq mi)
- Elevation: 533 m (1,749 ft)

Population (2011)
  - Total: 98
  - Density: 23/km^{2} (59/sq mi)
- Postal code: 341 01
- Website: http://www.obecmysliv.cz/

Milčice is a village, part of and located about 2.5 km southeast from Myslív in the Klatovy District. There are 66 addresses registered. In 2011, 98 people lived here permanently. It is also a cadastral territory with an area of 4.28 km^{2}.

== History ==
The date of the village's foundation is unknown.

== Chapel of St. Joseph ==
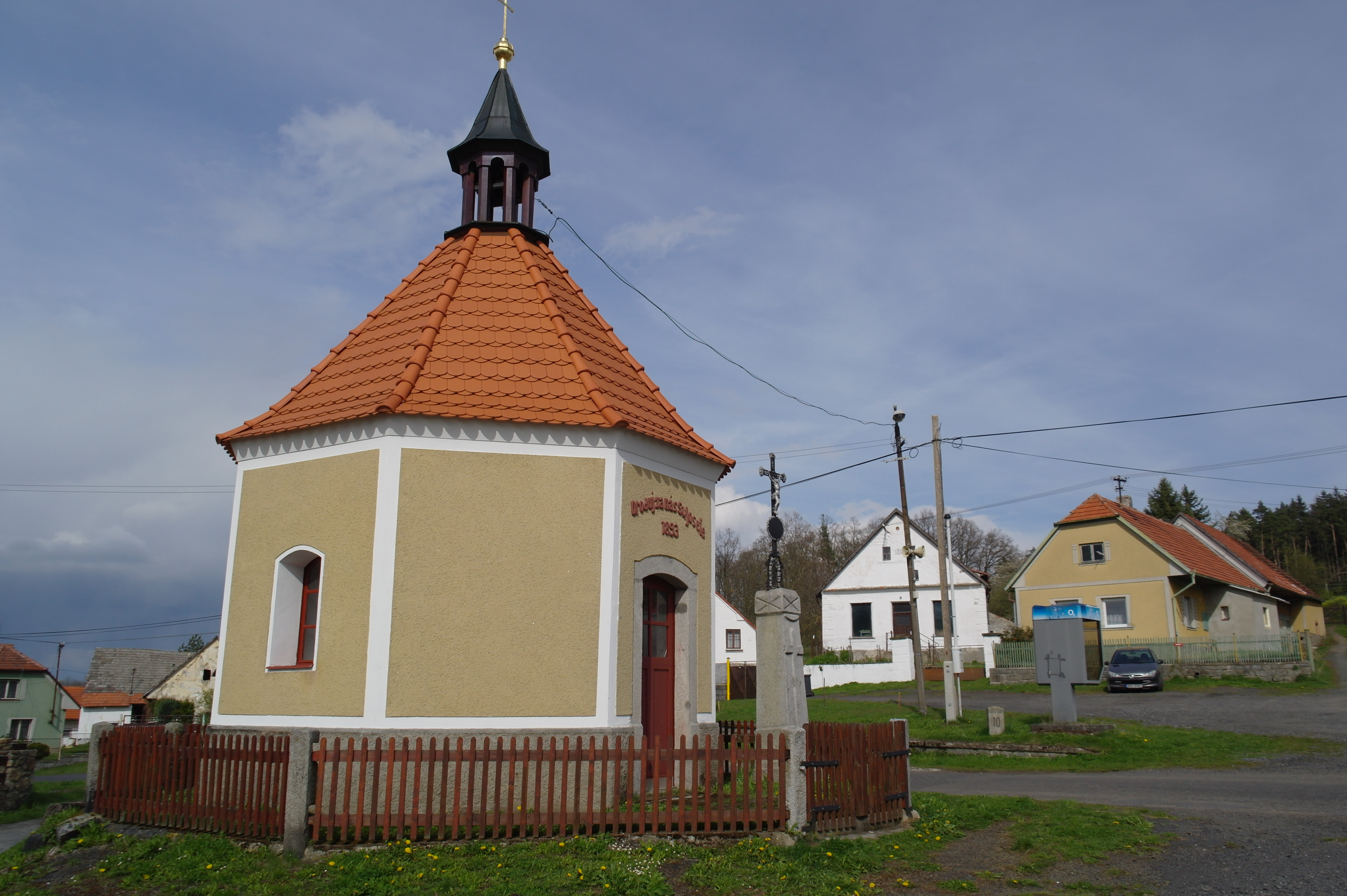

== Genealogy and Immigration to America ==
So far, about 46 people born in Milčice have been identified as immigrating to America, sorted and profiled on FamilySearch.
