= Zelená Hora Castle =

Castle in the Czech Republic

Coordinates: 49°29′47″N 13°34′52″E

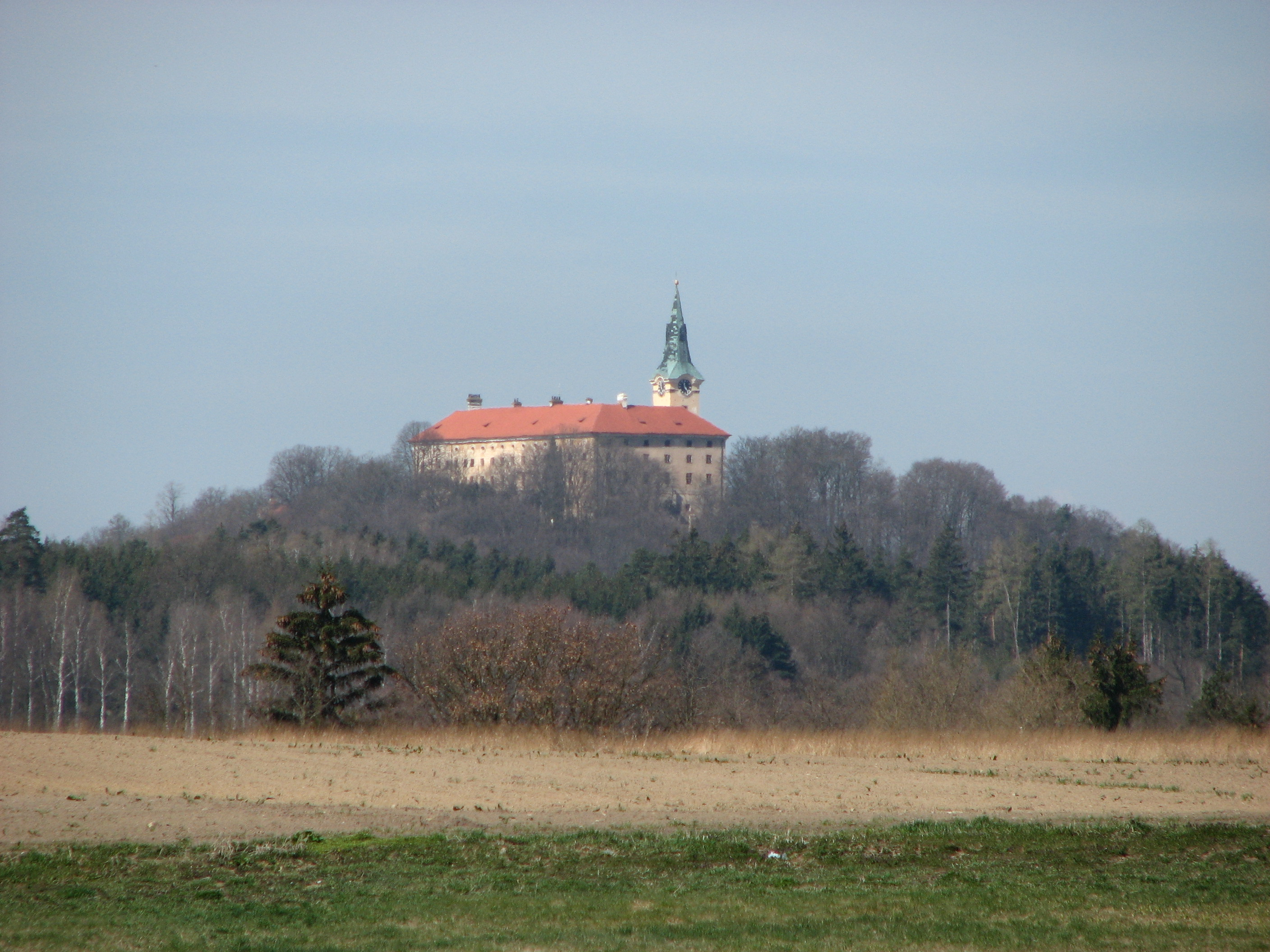
Zelená Hora Castle

Zelená Hora (literally "Green Mountain") is a castle in Klášter in the Plzeň Region of the Czech Republic. It is located on an eponymous mountains, close to the town of Nepomuk.

== History ==
The castle was first mentioned in a deed of Ottokar II of Bohemia from 1221. Until 1420, it was property of the monastery in what is today the village of Klášter. In 1425, after the monastery ceased to exist, the castle became the new centre of the estate. In 1436, it became property of the Lords of Schwamberg. The most notable owners of the castle and the estate were the Sternberg family, who acquired it around 1464 and held it until 1726. Most likely between 1670 and 1688, the medieval castle was rebuilt into an early Baroque residence.

From 1726 to 1784, Zelená Hora was owned by the houses of Martinic (1726–1784), Colloredo-Mansfeld (1784–1852), and Auersperg (1852–1931). After the castle was shortly owned by Czech private owners, it was confiscated by the state in 1938.

In 1817, Václav Hanka's forged medieval Manuscript of Zelená Hora, a counterpart to his Manuscript of Dvůr Kralové, was allegedly discovered in the castle and not exposed as a literary hoax, by Atheneum, until 1886.

== Tourism ==
Since 2020, the castle has been opened to the public.

== In popular culture ==
Zelená Hora Castle became nationwide popular as the filming location of the 1992 film Černí baroni.
