= Dvorec (Nepomuk) =

Coordinates: 49°29′50″N 13°36′24″E

- Part of town
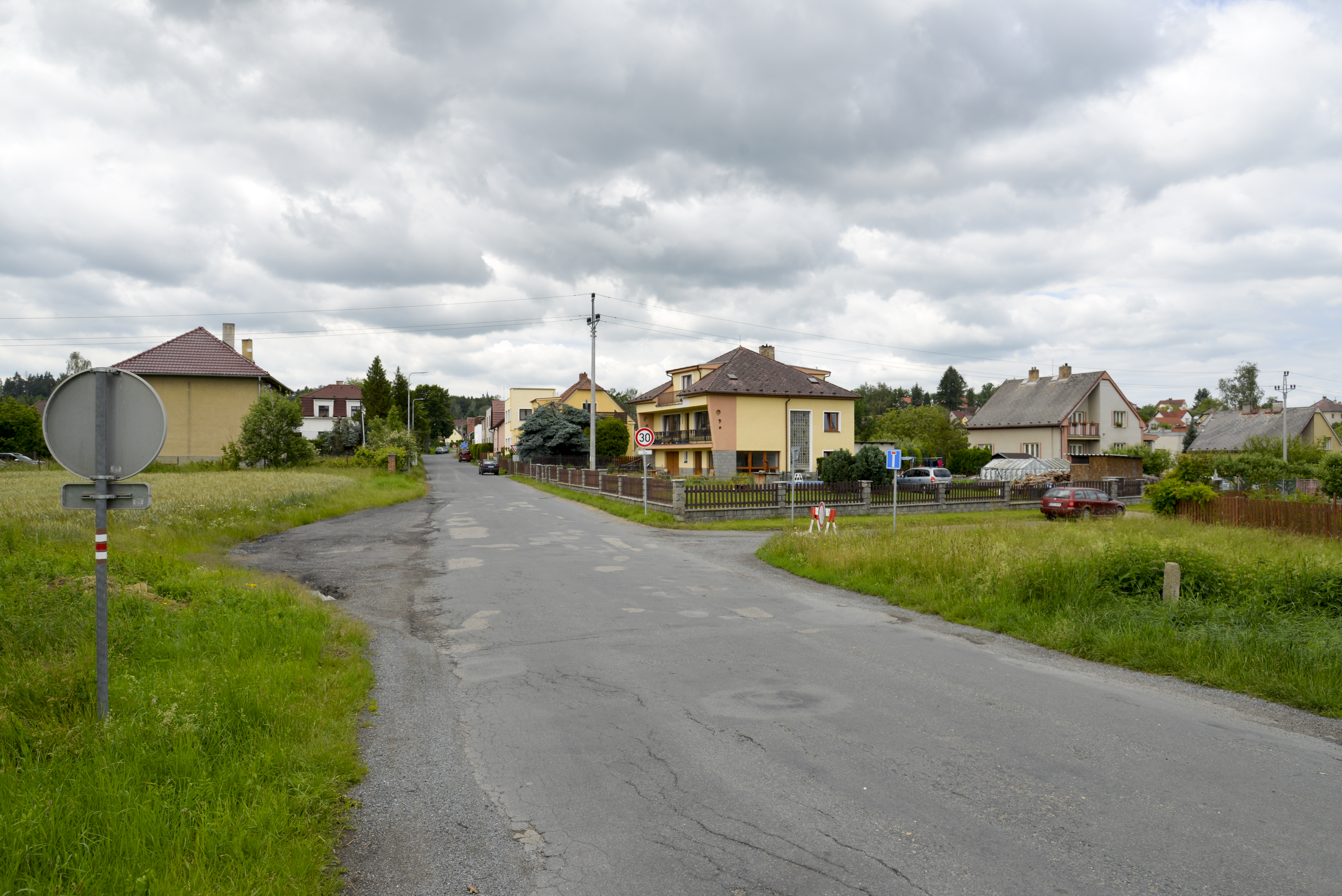
- Houses on the street
- Interactive map of Dvorec

Dvorec is a part of Nepomuk town located in its southeast part, Plzeň Region, the Czech Republic. It is further divided into two historical settlements Dvorec and Železná Huť, both accompanied by houses from the 20th century, first mentioned in 1552. There are two national monuments former metalworks and a statue of Saint Barbara from the 18th century.

== Gallery ==
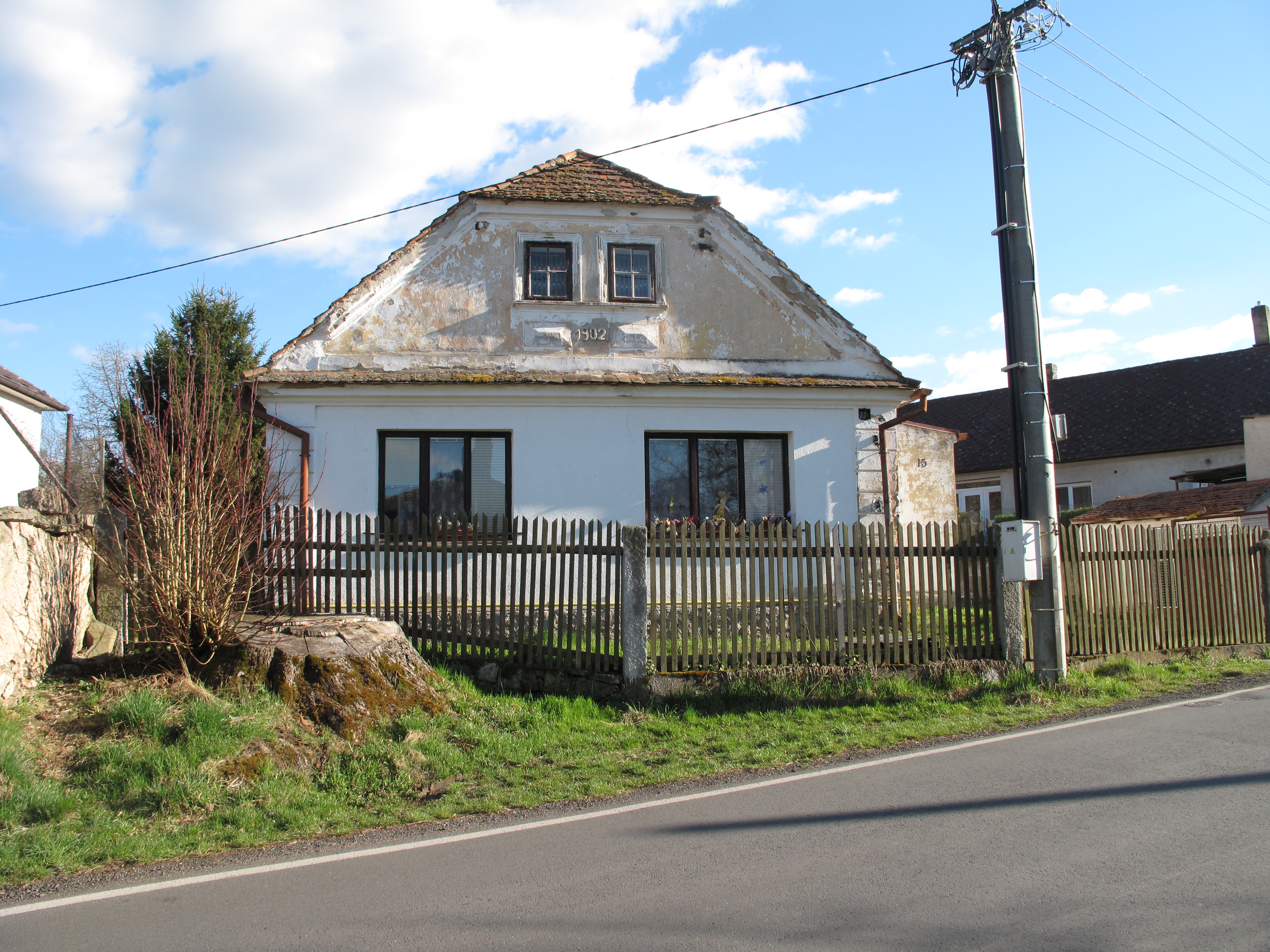
An old house

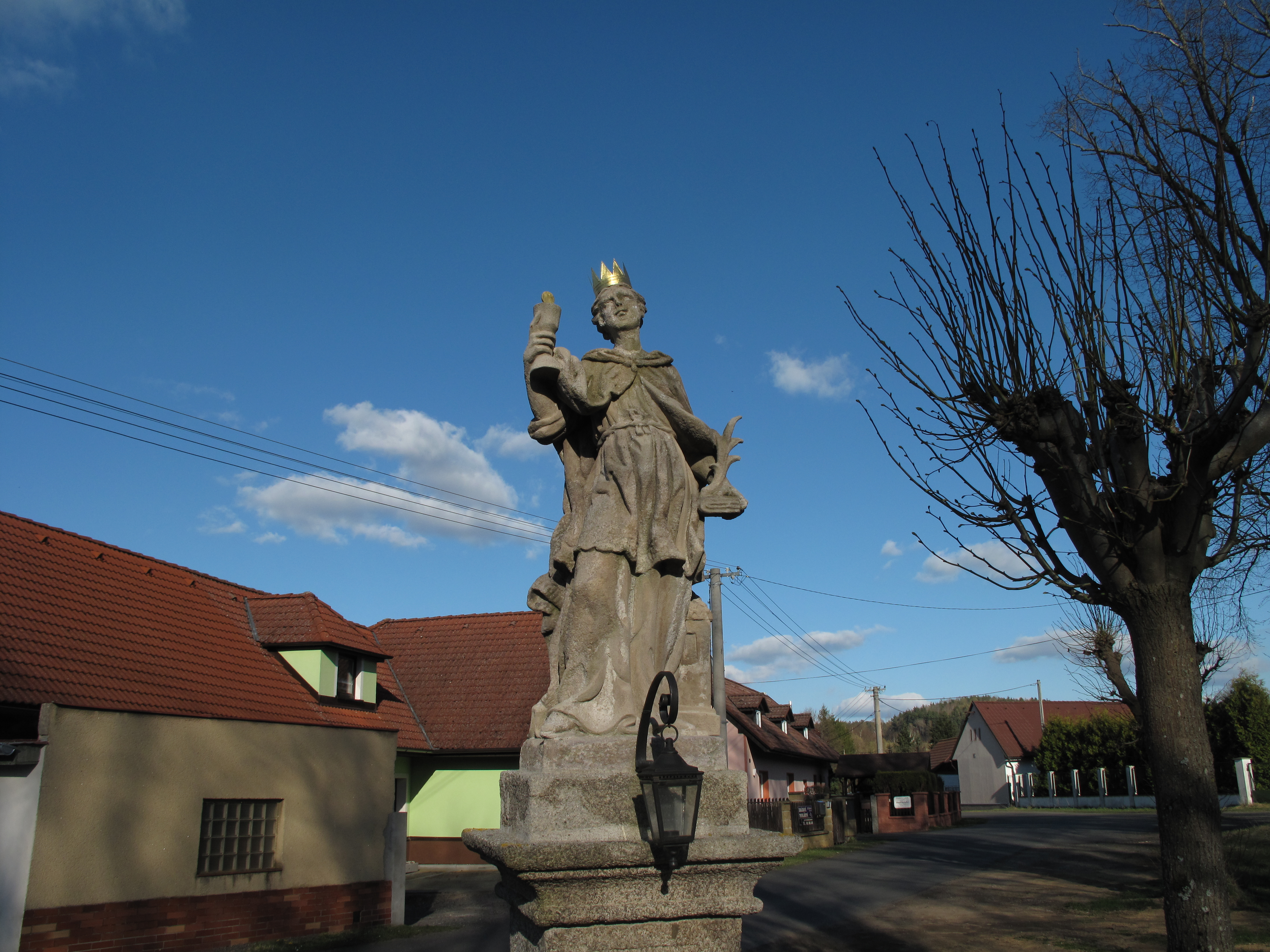
Statue of Saint Barbara

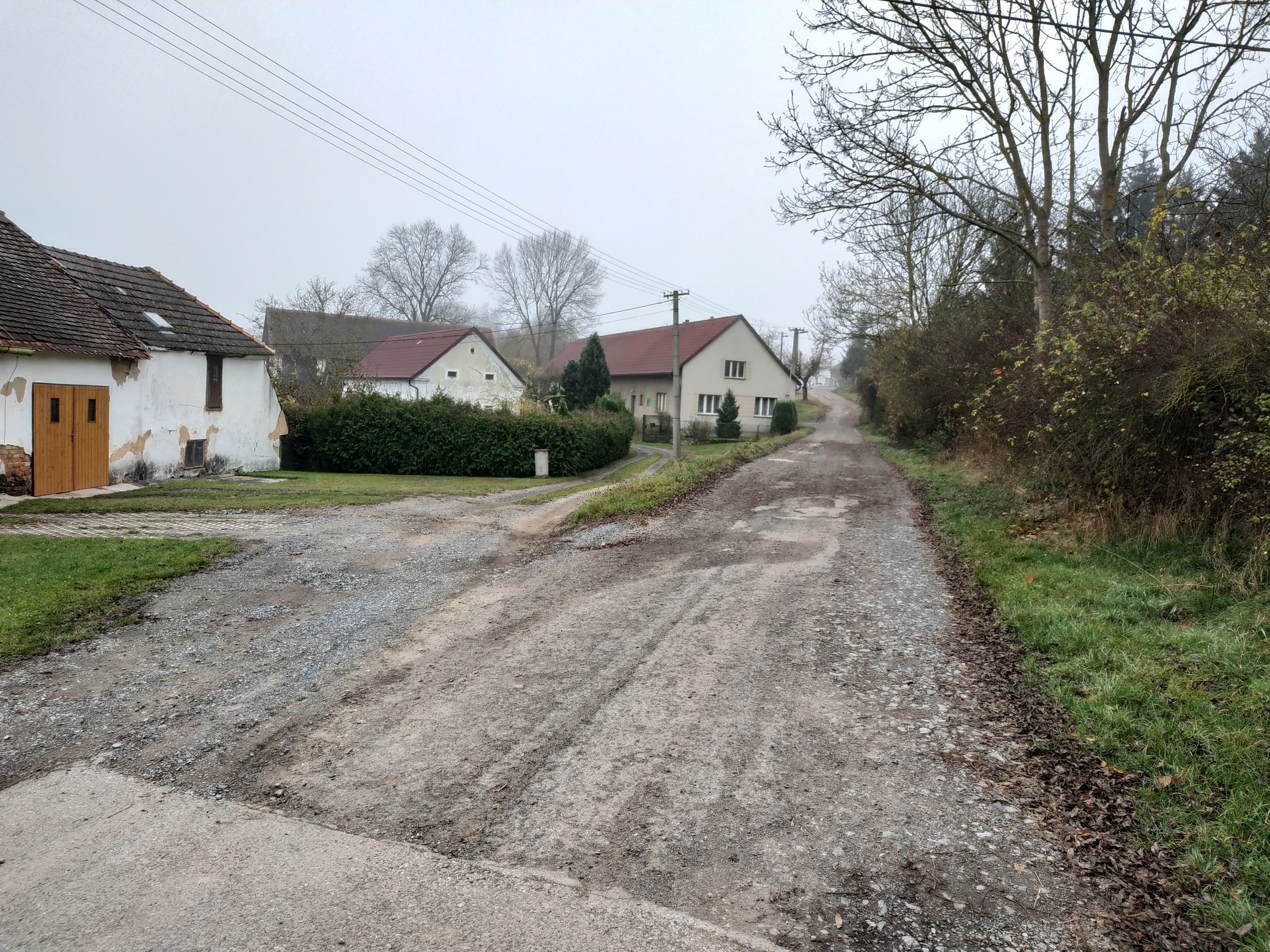
Road with houses
