= Burg Clam =

Castle in Austria

Coordinates: 48°13′15″N 14°46′42″E

- Upper Austria, Austria
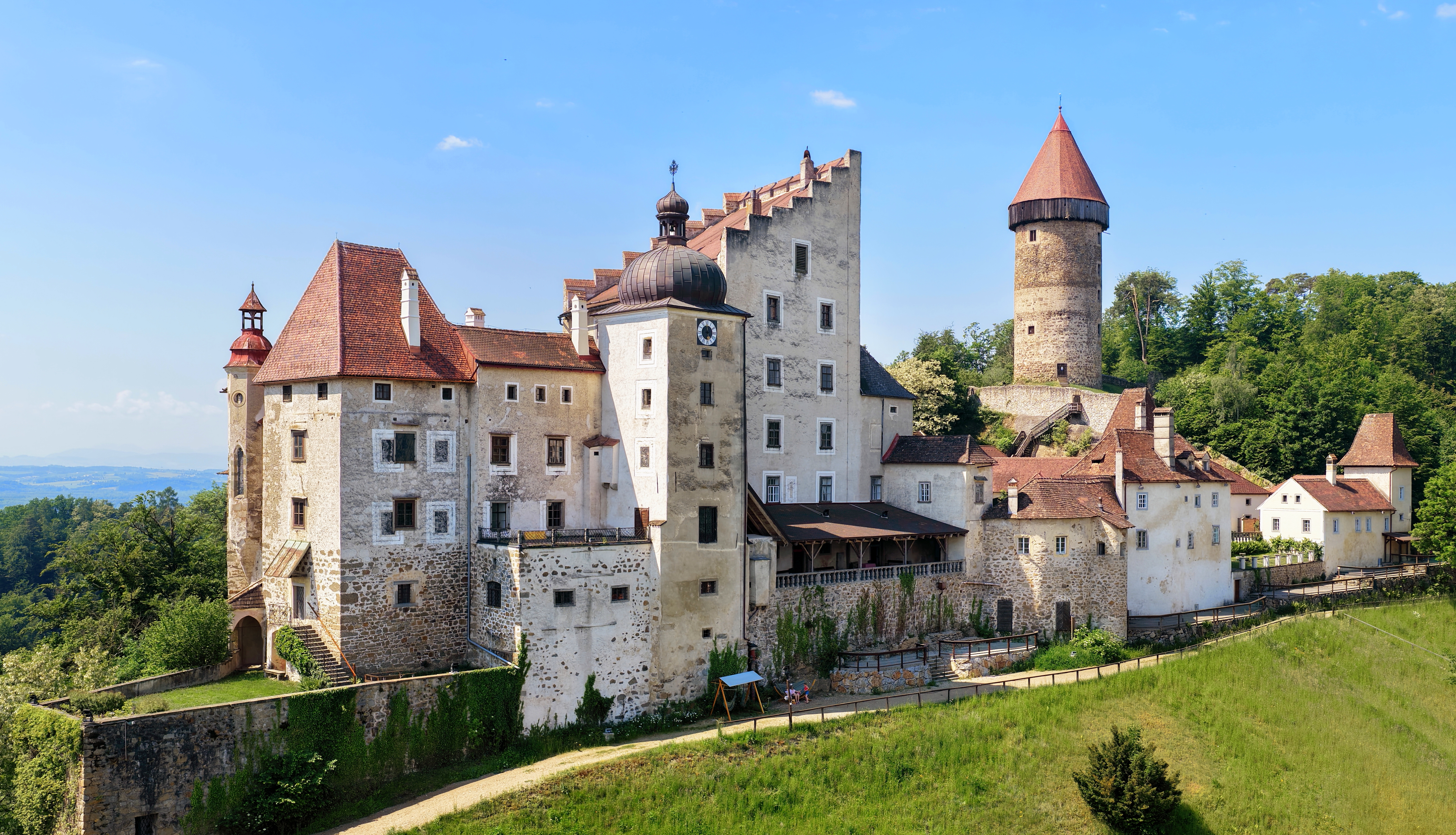
- Northeast face of Clam Castle

Site information
- Type: Castle
- Owner: Clam family
- Open to the public: Yes

Burg Clam is a medieval castle in the Upper Austria area of Austria. It is situated 337 metres (1,106 ft) above sea level.

Written records that mention the castle date back to the 12th century, and it has been in the possession of the Clam family since the 15th century.

== See also ==
- List of castles in Austria
