= Kovčín =

- Municipality
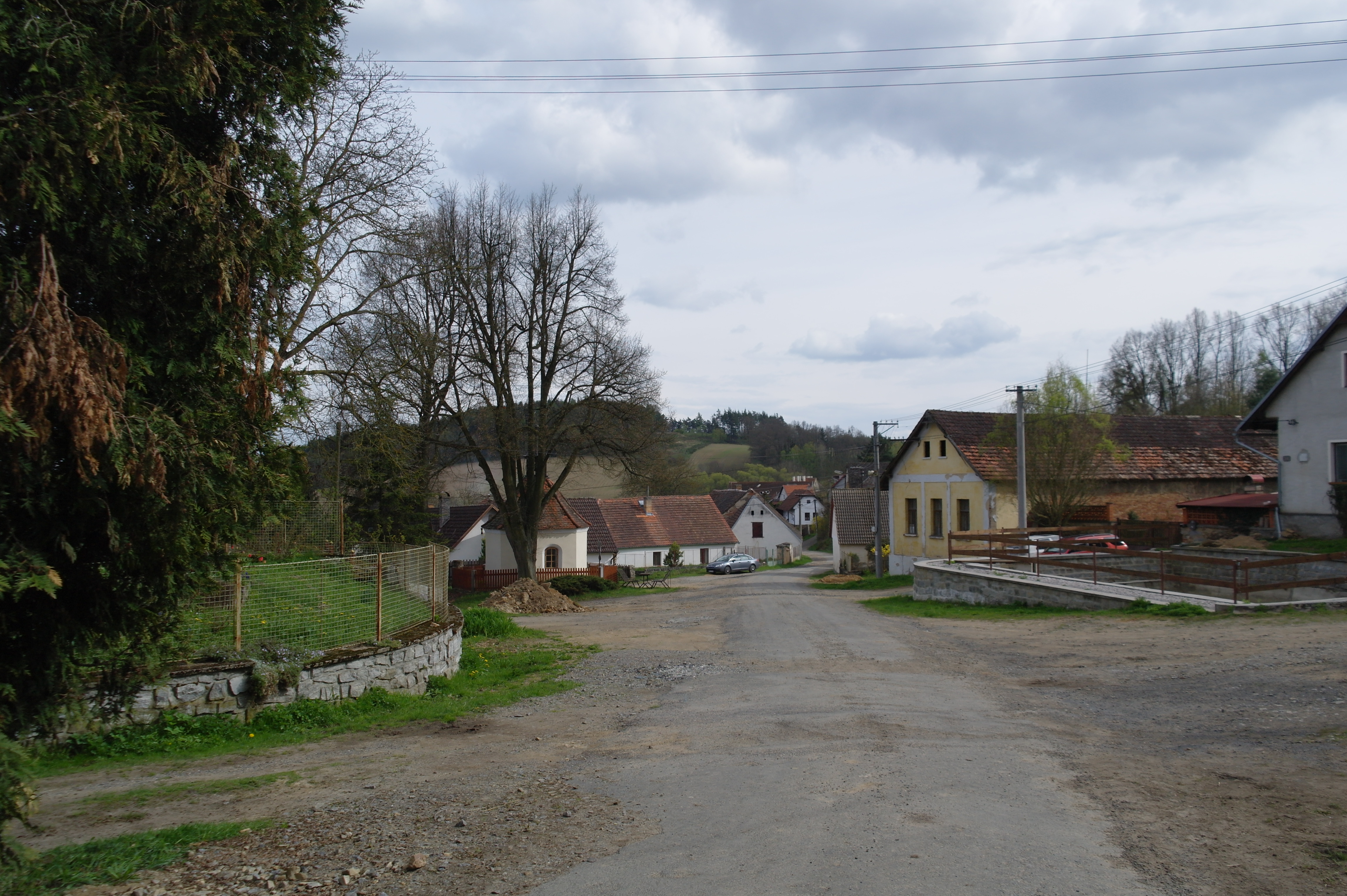
- Centre of Kovčín

- Flag Coat of arms

- Location in the Czech Republic
- Coordinates: 49°24′57″N 13°36′24″E
- Country: Czech Republic
- Region: Plzeň
- District: Klatovy
- First mentioned: 1551

Area
  - Total: 4.82 km^{2} (1.86 sq mi)
- Elevation: 532 m (1,745 ft)

Population (2026-01-01)
  - Total: 84
  - Density: 17/km^{2} (45/sq mi)
- Time zone: UTC+1 (CET)
  - Summer (DST): UTC+2 (CEST)
- Postal code: 341 01
- Website: www.kovcin.cz

Kovčín is a municipality and village in Klatovy District in the Plzeň Region of the Czech Republic. It has about 80 inhabitants.

Kovčín lies approximately 25 kilometres (16 mi) east of Klatovy, 41 km (25 mi) south-east of Plzeň, and 95 km (59 mi) south-west of Prague.

== History ==
The first written mention of Kovčín is from 1551, when it was part of the Zelená Hora estate.

== Demographics ==
Historical population
Year	Pop.	±%
1869	285	—
1880	274	−3.9%
1890	255	−6.9%
1900	277	+8.6%
1910	285	+2.9%
1921	277	−2.8%
1930	273	−1.4%
1950	199	−27.1%
1961	199	+0.0%
1970	160	−19.6%
1980	110	−31.2%
1991	95	−13.6%
2001	76	−20.0%
2011	80	+5.3%
2021	76	−5.0%
Source: Censuses
