= Klášter =

- Municipality
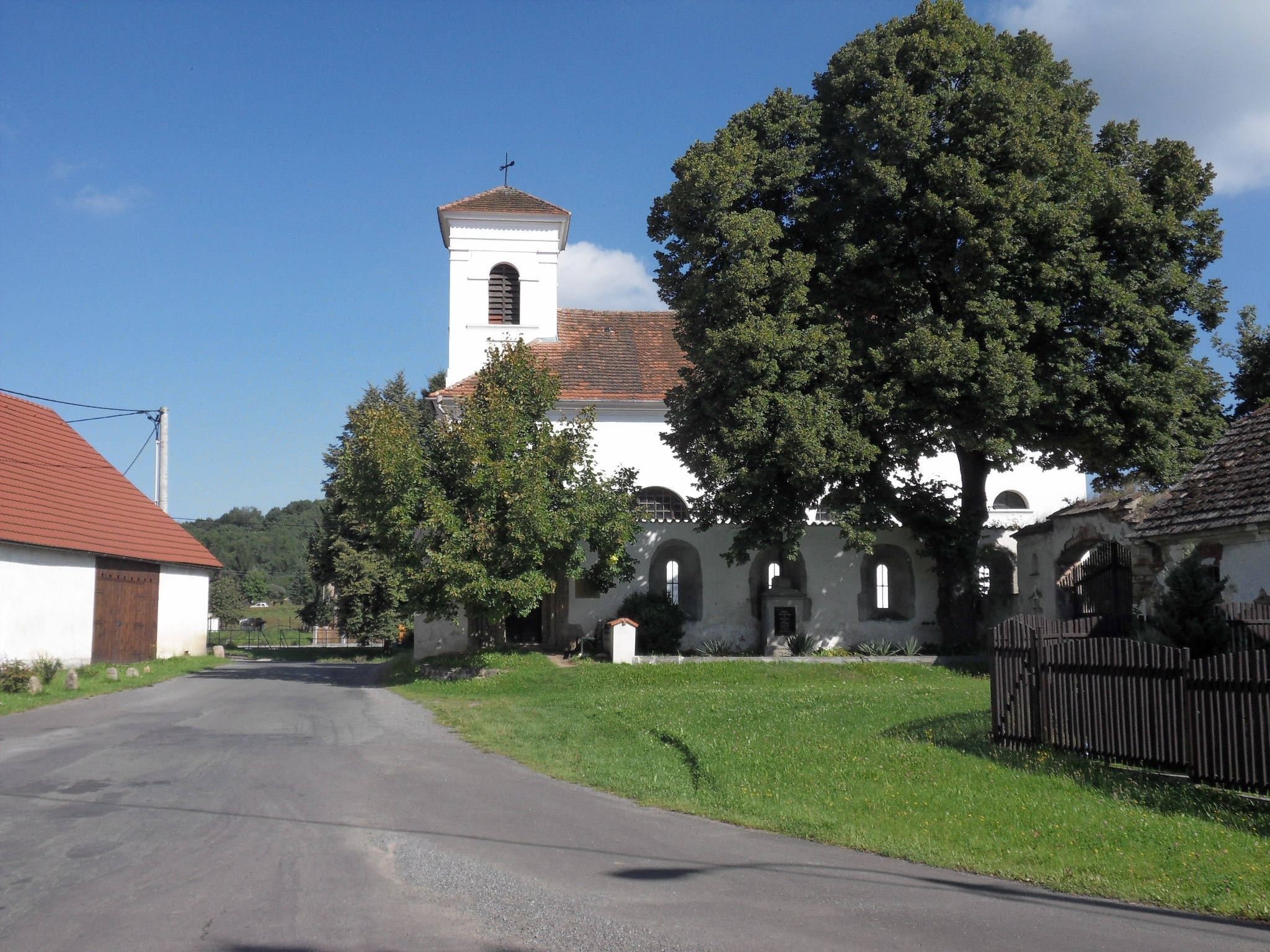
- Chapel of Saint Margaret with the remnants of the monastery guest house

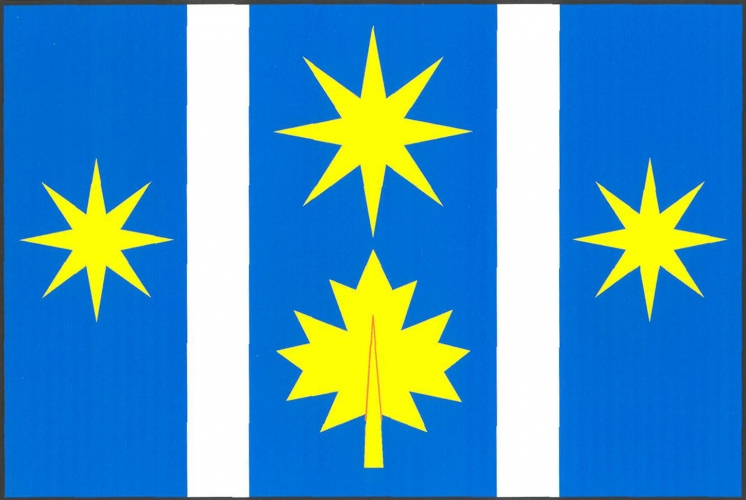
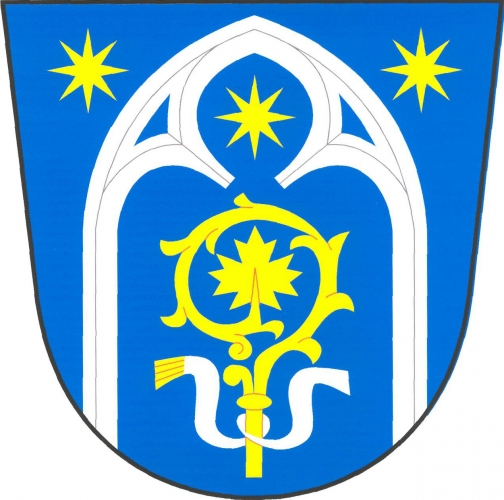
- Flag Coat of arms

- Location in the Czech Republic
- Coordinates: 49°30′7″N 13°34′36″E
- Country: Czech Republic
- Region: Plzeň
- District: Plzeň-South
- First mentioned: 1556

Area
  - Total: 8.65 km^{2} (3.34 sq mi)
- Elevation: 428 m (1,404 ft)

Population (2026-01-01)
  - Total: 215
  - Density: 24.9/km^{2} (64.4/sq mi)
- Time zone: UTC+1 (CET)
  - Summer (DST): UTC+2 (CEST)
- Postal code: 335 01
- Website: www.obecklaster.cz

Klášter (Czech pronunciation: [ˈklaːʃtɛr]; German: Kloster) is a municipality and village in Plzeň-South District in the Plzeň Region of the Czech Republic. It has about 200 inhabitants. The municipality is located on the Úslava River, on the border between the Švihov Highlands and Blatná Uplands.

Klášter was founded inside the ruins of a monastery, which was destroyed in the 15th century. The main landmark of the municipality is the Zelená Hora Castle.

== Etymology ==
The name Klášter literally means 'monastery' in Czech.

== Geography ==
Klášter is located about 28 kilometres (17 mi) southeast of Plzeň. It lies on the border between the Švihov Highlands and Blatná Uplands. The highest point is the hill Zelená hora at 532 m (1,745 ft) above sea level. The Úslava River flows through the municipality. The village is situated on the shore of the fishpond Klášterský rybník, supplied by the Úslava.

== History ==
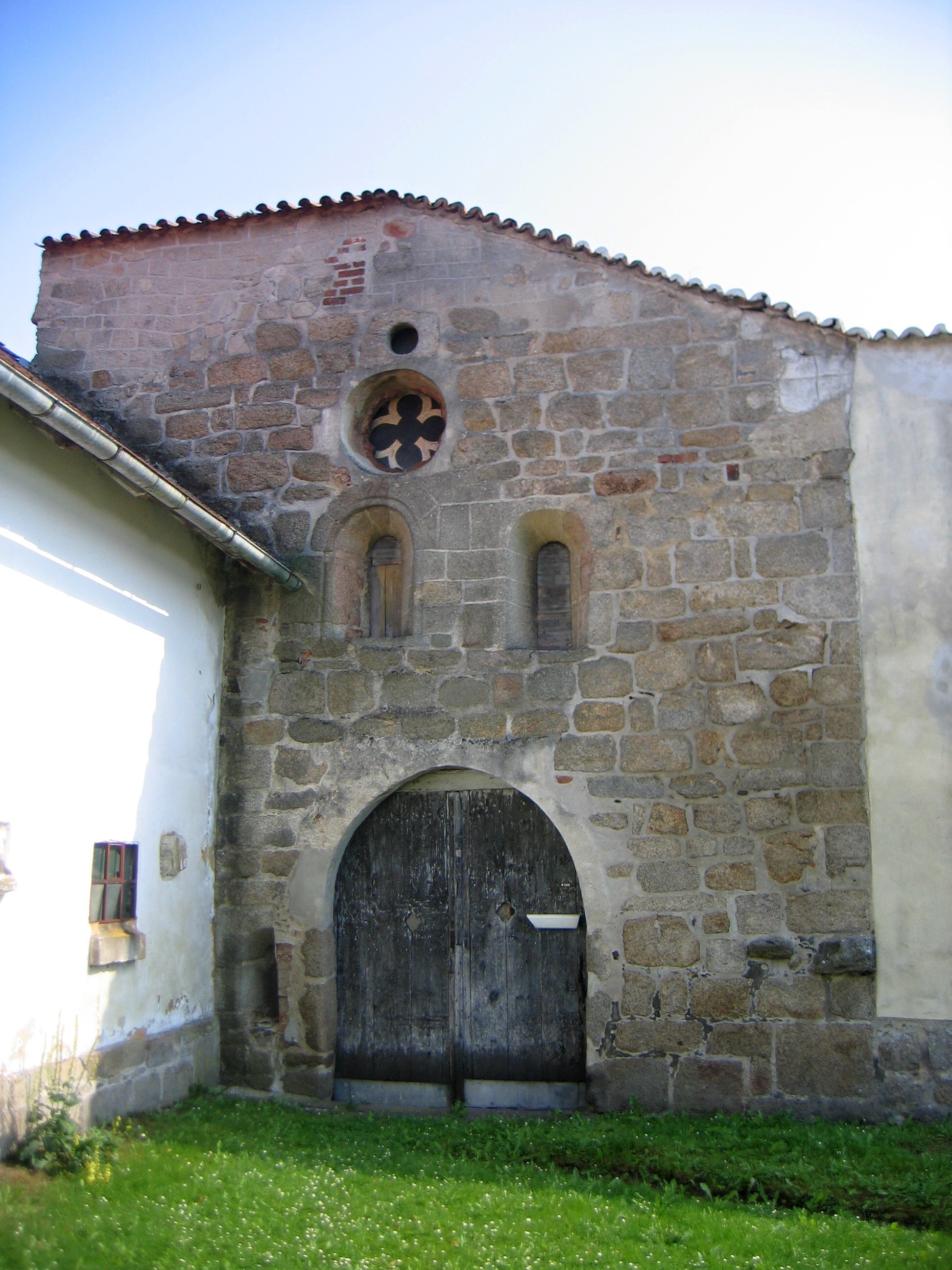
Remnants of the monastery

History of the village is connected with the medieval Cistercian monastery, which was founded here in 1144–1145 by monks from the Ebrach Abbey. It was destroyed by the Hussites during the Hussite Wars in 1420. After the monastery was destroyed, a village began to emerge in its ruins, whose new inhabitants used the remains of buildings to build their dwellings. The first written mention of the village of Klášter is from 1556.

The Zelená Hora Castle was first mentioned in a deed of King Ottokar II from 1221. Until 1420, it was property of the monastery. In 1425, after the monastery ceased to exist, all its properties were acquired by the town of Klatovy and the castle became the new centre of the estate. In 1436, it became property of the Lords of Schwamberg. The most notable owners of the estate were the Sternberg family, who acquired it around 1464 and held it until 1726. Most likely between 1670 and 1688, the medieval castle was rebuilt into an early Baroque residence.

Zelená Hora was then owned by the houses of Martinic (1726–1784), Colloredo-Mansfeld (1784–1852) and Auersperg (1852–1931). In 1817–1819, the castle became known as the site where Manuscript of Zelená Hora was founded. After the castle was shortly owned by Czech private owners, it was confiscated by the state in 1938.

== Demographics ==
Historical population

Year	Pop.	±%
1869	701	—
1880	740	+5.6%
1890	696	−5.9%
1900	635	−8.8%
1910	633	−0.3%

Year	Pop.	±%
1921	644	+1.7%
1930	602	−6.5%
1950	732	+21.6%
1961	454	−38.0%
1970	289	−36.3%

Year	Pop.	±%
1980	231	−20.1%
1991	155	−32.9%
2001	173	+11.6%
2011	189	+9.2%
2021	226	+19.6%

Source: Censuses

== Transport ==
The I/20 road (part of the European route E49) from Plzeň to České Budějovice runs through the municipality.

The railway line Plzeň–Horažďovice runs along the eastern municipal border, but there is no train station. Klášter is served by the station in Nepomuk.

== Sights ==
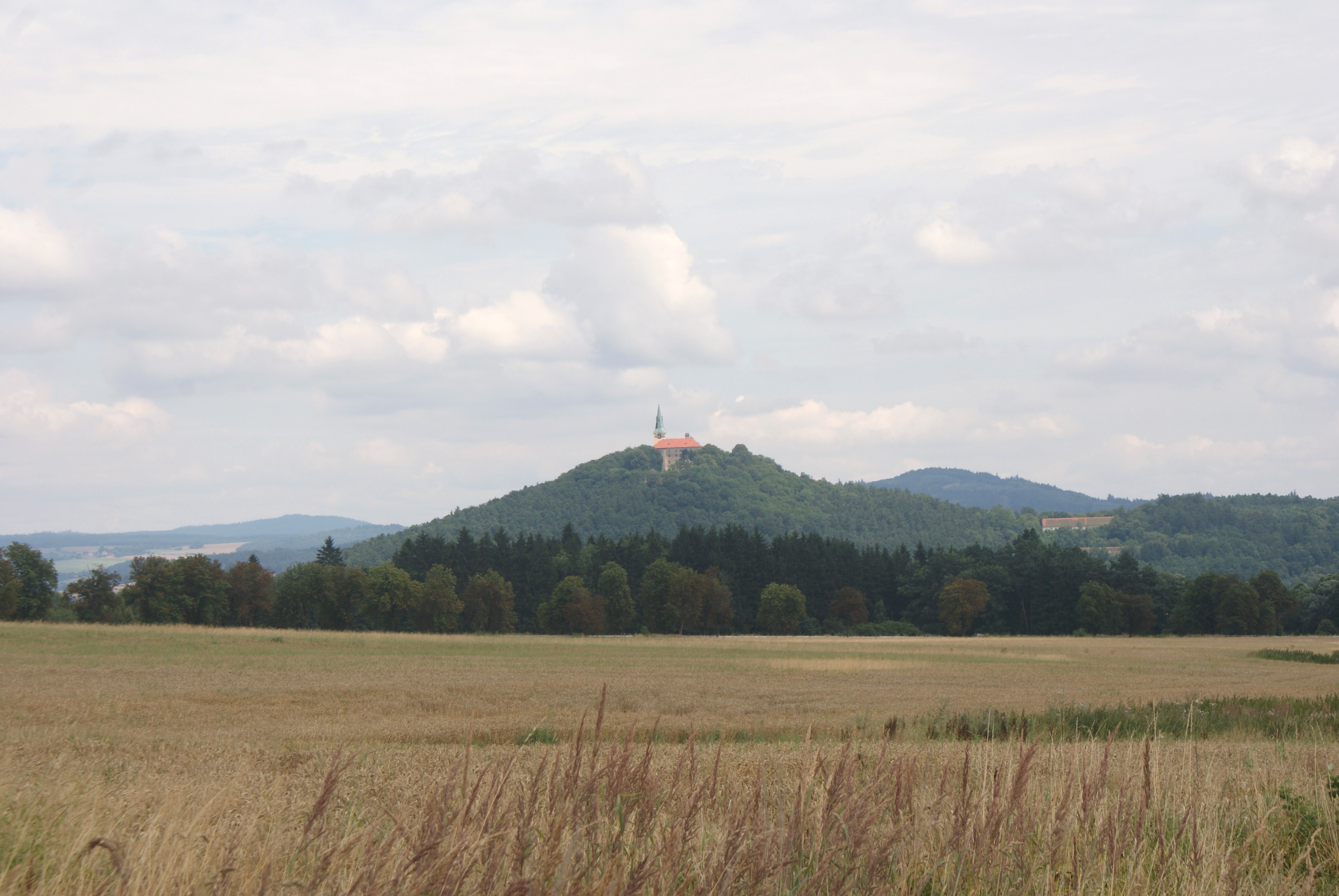
Zelená Hora Castle

Most of the village is placed inside the ruins of the monastery. The monastery was among the most important monasteries in the Kingdom of Bohemia in the 13th and 14th centuries and was formed by a monumental Romanesque-Gothic complex of buildings. Their remains are still visible, mostly incorporated in some village buildings.

The main landmark of Klášter is the Zelená Hora Castle, located on the hill Zelená hora. Since 2020, it has been opened to the public.

The Chapel of Saint Margaret was built in the late Empire style in 1861–1862, but it probably incorporates some early Gothic ruins of the monastery.

== In popular culture ==
Zelená Hora Castle became nationwide popular as the filming location of the 1992 film Černí baroni.
