= Clam-Martinic family =

Habsburg noble family

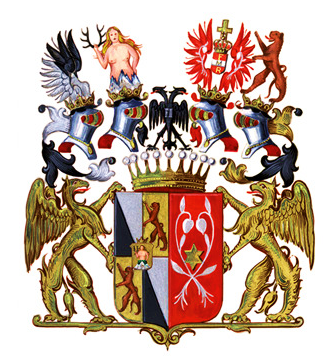
Coat of Arms of the Counts of Clam-Martinitz, Barons of Höhenberg

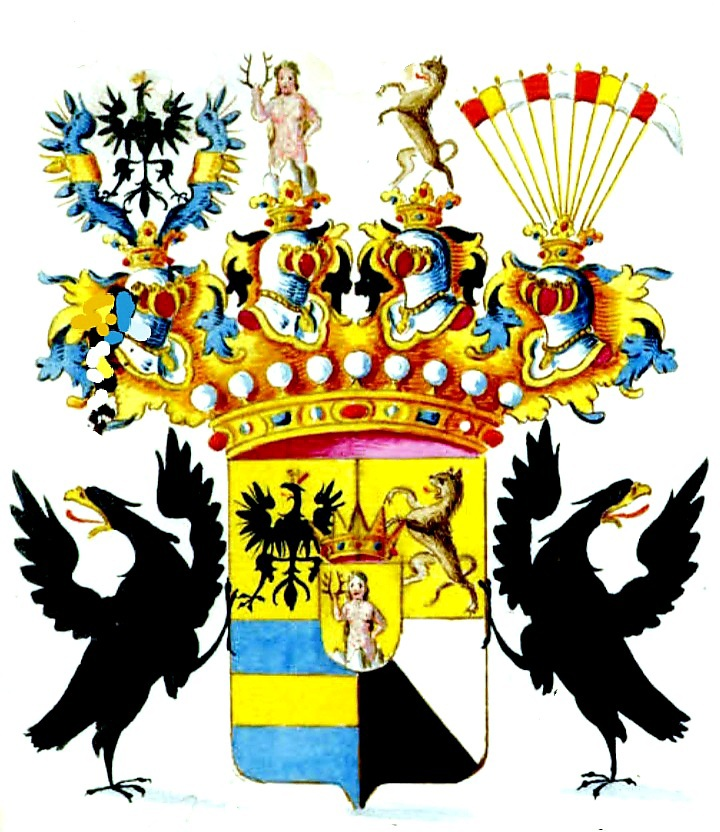
Coat of Arms of the Counts of Clam-Gallas (1768)

The House of Clam-Martinic is the name of an old and influential noble family, whose family members occupied many important positions within the Habsburg Empire.

== History ==
The family originates from Berg near Henndorf am Wallersee and appeared under the name Berger or Pörger (Perger), Edle Herren von Höchenperg. Around 1209 a Carinthian branch owned Höhenbergen castle near Völkermarkt. In 1524, the family acquired Clam Castle in Upper Austria, which to this day is owned by the family.

This line was established when Carl Josef, Count of Clam (1760-1826), a member of an old Austrian noble Clam family, married Maria Anna, Countess of Martinic (z Martinicz or Martinicové in Czech) (1768-1832), a member of an old Bohemian noble family claimed to be descended from the Vršovci family.

== Clam-Gallas ==
The other line of the Clam family, namely Counts of Clamm und Gallas, owners of the Frýdlant castle, whose other possessions were mostly in Bohemia, died out in 1930.

== Gallery ==
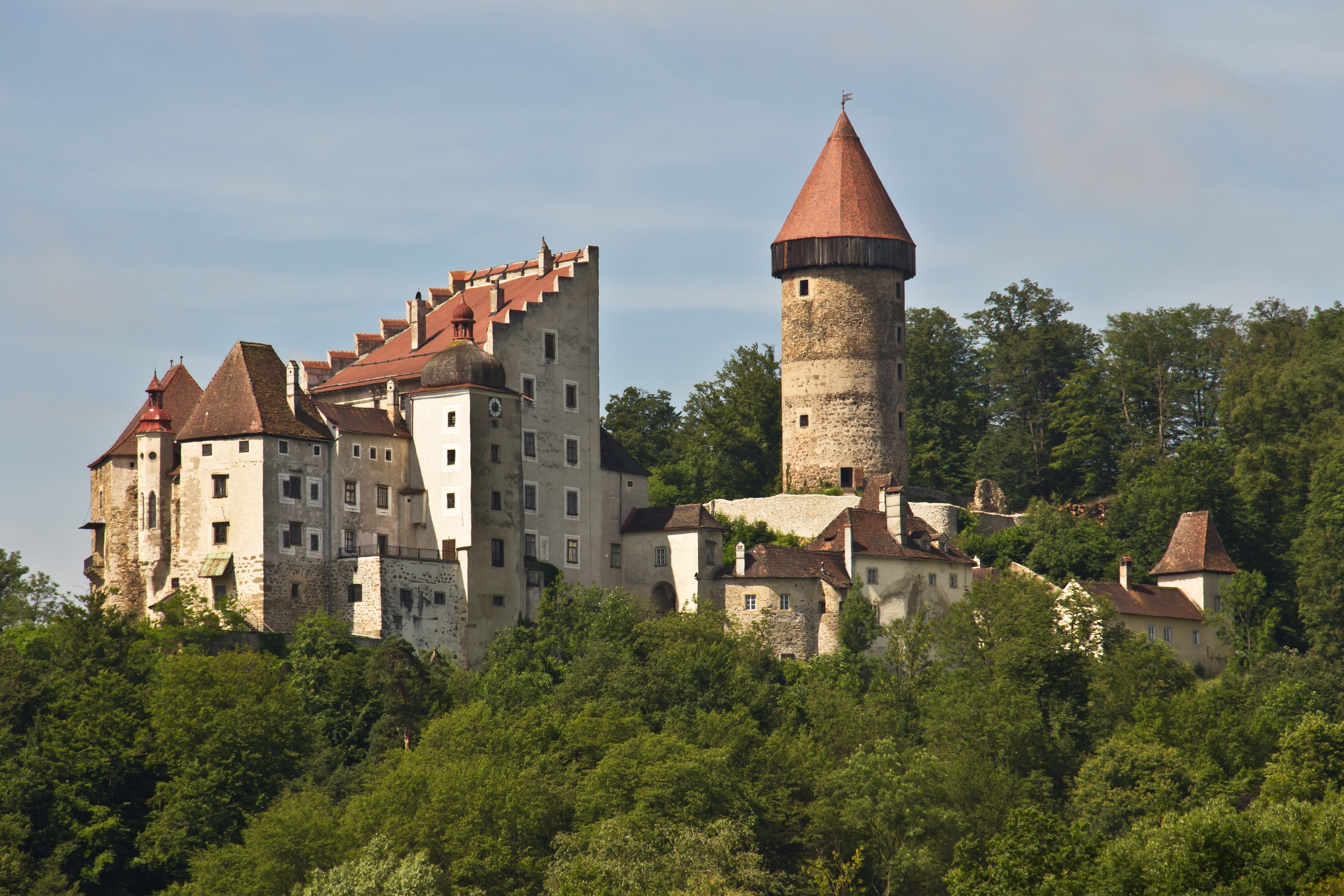
Clam Castle, Upper Austria

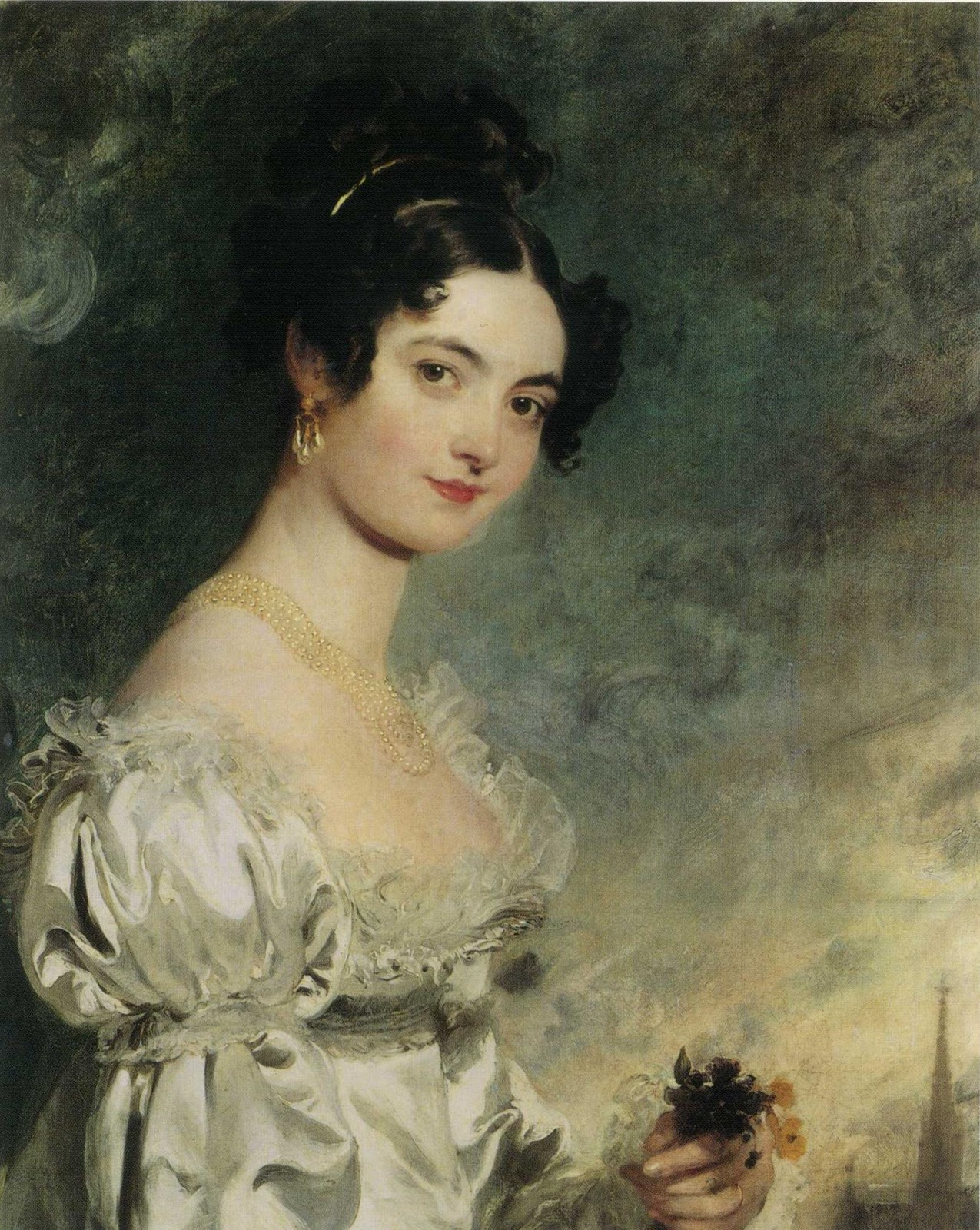
Lady Selina Meade (1797–1872), who married the Count of Clam-Martinic, painted by Thomas Lawrence in Vienna in 1819

== Prominent members ==
- Karl von Clam-Martinic (1792-1840), Austrian statesman and lieutenant field marshal.
- Jindřich Jaroslav von Clam-Martinic (1826–1887), also known as Heinrich Jaroslav, Count of Clam-Martinic, Bohemian politician
- Richard, Count of Clam-Martinic (1832-1891), Geheimrat, Order of the Golden Fleece
- Heinrich von Clam-Martinic (1863–1932), Austrian statesman and prime minister
- Georg von Clam-Martinic (1908–2000), Austrian author and engineer
