= Nepomuk =

Town in the Czech Republic

- Town
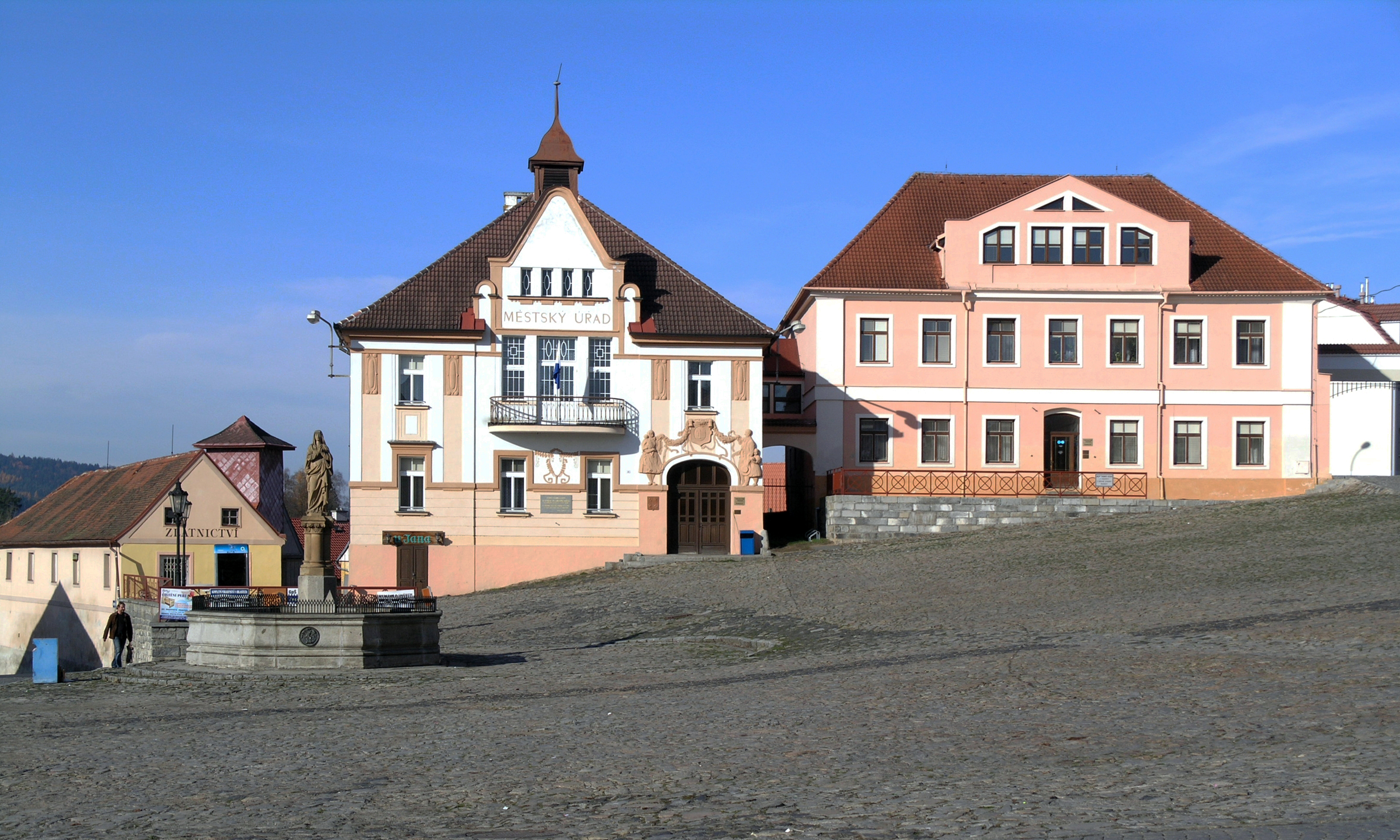
- Town hall on the town square

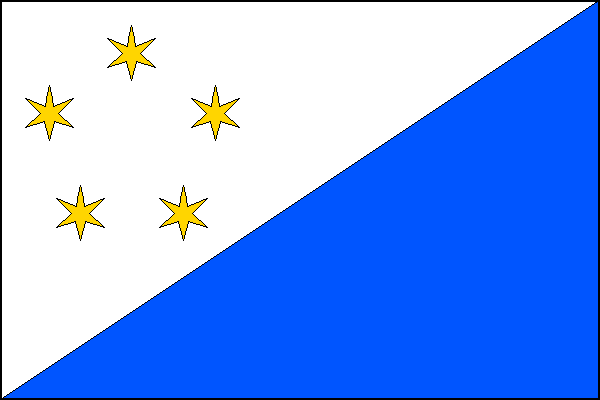
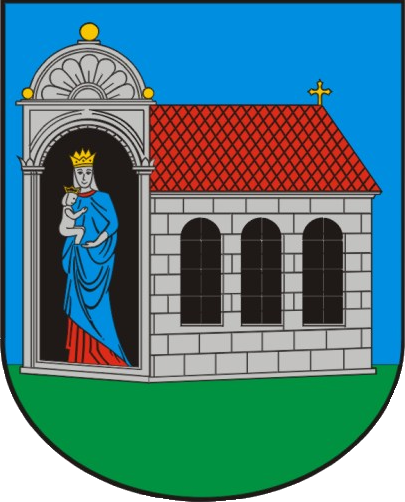
- Flag Coat of arms

- Location in the Czech Republic
- Coordinates: 49°29′11″N 13°34′56″E
- Country: Czech Republic
- Region: Plzeň
- District: Plzeň-South
- First mentioned: 1144

Government
  - Mayor: Vladimír Vokurka

Area
  - Total: 12.80 km^{2} (4.94 sq mi)
- Elevation: 449 m (1,473 ft)

Population (2026-01-01)
  - Total: 3,538
  - Density: 276.4/km^{2} (715.9/sq mi)
- Time zone: UTC+1 (CET)
  - Summer (DST): UTC+2 (CEST)
- Postal codes: 304 03, 335 03
- Website: www.nepomuk.cz

Nepomuk (Czech pronunciation: [ˈnɛpomuk]; German: Pomuk) is a town in Plzeň-South District in the Plzeň Region of the Czech Republic. It has about 3,500 inhabitants. The town is located in the Blatná Uplands.

Nepomuk was founded in the first half of the 12th century at the latest and became a town in 1413. It is known as the birthplace of Saint John of Nepomuk, who was born here around 1345.

== Administrative division ==
Nepomuk consists of two municipal parts (in brackets population according to the 2021 census):

- Nepomuk (2,779)
- Dvorec (785)

== Etymology ==
The town was originally named Pomuk, but the origin of the name is unclear. According to legend, it is derived from the rain that descended on the region after the blessing of Saint Adalbert in 992 (from the Old Czech verb pomoknout, i.e. 'to make wet').

== Geography ==
Nepomuk is located about 30 kilometres (19 mi) south of Plzeň. It lies in the Blatná Uplands. The highest point is located in the westernmost part of the municipal territory at 544 m (1,785 ft) above sea level. The Mihovka Stream flows through the town. East of the town are two notable fishponds, Dvorecký rybník and Panský rybník. There are also several other fishponds in the municipal territory.

=== Climate ===
Nepomuk's climate is classified as humid continental climate (Köppen: Dfb; Trewartha: Dclo). Among them, the annual average temperature is 8.3 °C (46.9 °F), the hottest month in July is 18.0 °C (64.4 °F), and the coldest month is −0.9 °C (30.4 °F) in January. The annual precipitation is 635.2 millimetres (25.01 in), of which June is the wettest with 86.1 millimetres (3.39 in), while February is the driest with only 31.1 millimetres (1.22 in). The extreme temperature throughout the year ranged from −32.2 °C (−26.0 °F) on 10 February 1956 to 39.2 °C (102.6 °F) on 27 July 1983.

Climate data for Nepomuk, 1991–2020 normals, extremes 1941–present
Month	Jan	Feb	Mar	Apr	May	Jun	Jul	Aug	Sep	Oct	Nov	Dec	Year
Record high °C (°F)	15.8 (60.4)	20.2 (68.4)	24.7 (76.5)	30.5 (86.9)	33.4 (92.1)	35.5 (95.9)	39.2 (102.6)	37.2 (99.0)	33.9 (93.0)	28.2 (82.8)	18.9 (66.0)	16.9 (62.4)	39.2 (102.6)
Mean daily maximum °C (°F)	2.2 (36.0)	4.2 (39.6)	8.8 (47.8)	14.9 (58.8)	19.5 (67.1)	22.9 (73.2)	25.0 (77.0)	25.0 (77.0)	19.5 (67.1)	13.3 (55.9)	6.6 (43.9)	2.8 (37.0)	13.7 (56.7)
Daily mean °C (°F)	−0.9 (30.4)	−0.2 (31.6)	3.5 (38.3)	8.3 (46.9)	12.9 (55.2)	16.5 (61.7)	18.0 (64.4)	17.4 (63.3)	12.6 (54.7)	8.0 (46.4)	3.4 (38.1)	0.1 (32.2)	8.3 (46.9)
Mean daily minimum °C (°F)	−4.0 (24.8)	−4.2 (24.4)	−0.9 (30.4)	2.2 (36.0)	6.4 (43.5)	9.9 (49.8)	11.5 (52.7)	11.1 (52.0)	7.3 (45.1)	3.7 (38.7)	0.4 (32.7)	−2.8 (27.0)	3.4 (38.1)
Record low °C (°F)	−29.3 (−20.7)	−32.2 (−26.0)	−26.0 (−14.8)	−10.2 (13.6)	−5.0 (23.0)	−2.0 (28.4)	1.5 (34.7)	0.6 (33.1)	−4.5 (23.9)	−12.1 (10.2)	−15.2 (4.6)	−29.2 (−20.6)	−32.2 (−26.0)
Average precipitation mm (inches)	37.2 (1.46)	31.1 (1.22)	42.1 (1.66)	35.2 (1.39)	66.8 (2.63)	86.1 (3.39)	83.0 (3.27)	78.0 (3.07)	46.5 (1.83)	47.9 (1.89)	40.6 (1.60)	40.8 (1.61)	635.2 (25.01)
Average snowfall cm (inches)	15.4 (6.1)	13.7 (5.4)	5.2 (2.0)	0.4 (0.2)	0.0 (0.0)	0.0 (0.0)	0.0 (0.0)	0.0 (0.0)	0.0 (0.0)	0.5 (0.2)	4.5 (1.8)	11.5 (4.5)	51.1 (20.1)
Average relative humidity (%)	84.7	80.7	76.9	71.2	72.4	72.6	72.0	73.6	78.9	82.8	87.3	86.8	78.3
Mean monthly sunshine hours	42.0	72.8	140.7	191.5	192.8	218.7	238.5	224.9	157.8	101.1	50.0	42.1	1,672.9
Source: Czech Hydrometeorological Institute

== History ==
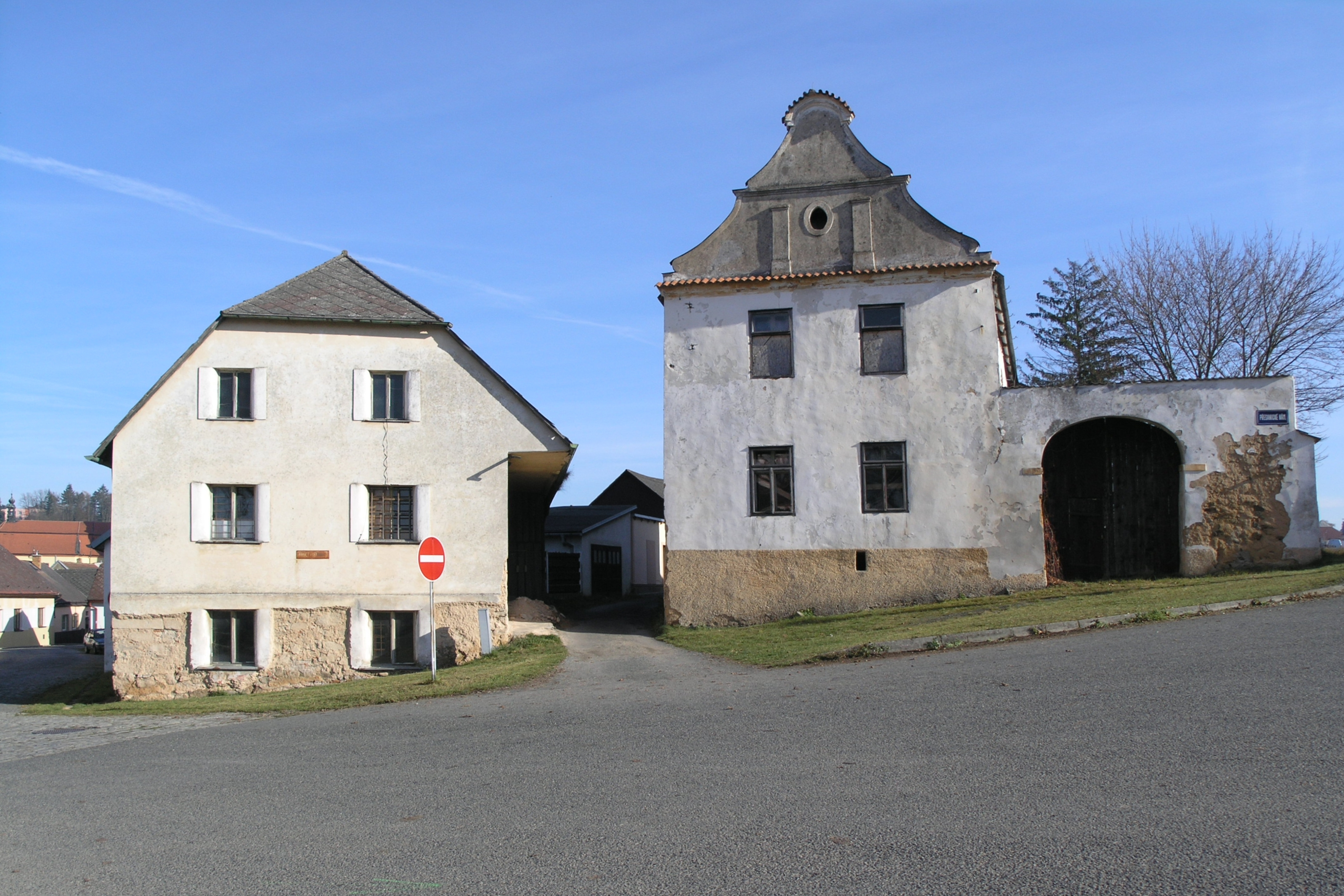
U Lípy House

The first written mention of Pomuk is from 1144, when a new Cistercian monastery was built nearby. The monastery was destroyed by the Hussite army in 1420 and now there is the village of Klášter. In 1384, Pomuk was merged with neighbouring Přesanice and renamed Nepomuk. It was promoted to a town in 1413.

After the monastery was destroyed, its properties were acquired by Lords of Schwamberg and then by the Sternberg family. The greatest development of the town is connected with the Baroque period, when Nepomuk was an important pilgrimage site. After confusion, when Nepomuk was alternately called a town and a market town, the town status was confirmed by Emperor Charles VI in 1730.

== Demographics ==
Historical population

Year	Pop.	±%
1869	2,572	—
1880	2,967	+15.4%
1890	2,668	−10.1%
1900	2,506	−6.1%
1910	2,532	+1.0%

Year	Pop.	±%
1921	2,478	−2.1%
1930	2,448	−1.2%
1950	2,331	−4.8%
1961	2,568	+10.2%
1970	2,616	+1.9%

Year	Pop.	±%
1980	3,206	+22.6%
1991	3,211	+0.2%
2001	3,546	+10.4%
2011	3,809	+7.4%
2021	3,564	−6.4%

Source: Censuses

== Transport ==
The I/20 road (part of the European route E49) from Plzeň to České Budějovice runs through the town.

Nepomuk is located on the major interregional railway line Brno–Plzeň. It addition, it is a starting point of a local line to Blatná.

== Sights ==
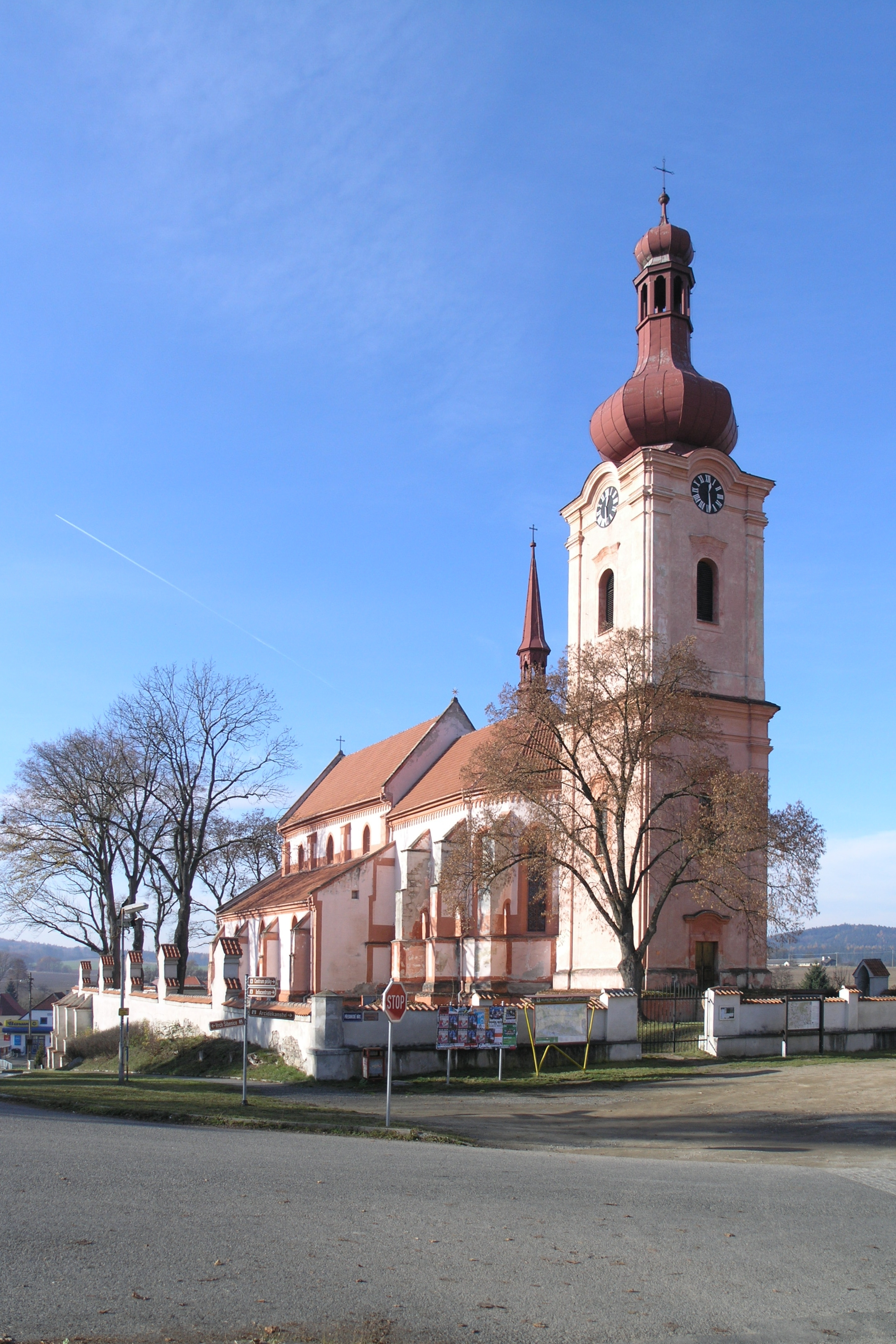
Church of Saint James the Great

The main landmark of the town centre is the Church of Saint John of Nepomuk. It was originally an early Baroque church from the mid-17th century, but it was completely rebuilt by Kilian Ignaz Dientzenhofer in 1734–1738.

The Church of Saint James the Great was originally a Romanesque church built in 1142–1153. It was then rebuilt in the early Gothic style at the end of the 13th century and in 1360–1370. The church was abolished in 1786 and the building served as a granary until 1857. In 1859–1860, it was reconstructed in the pseudo-Gothic style and since 1860, it has been a parish church. The separate late Baroque bell tower was built next to the church in 1780–1790.

U Lípy House was built between 1360 and 1370 and is the oldest house in the town. The current appearance is from the early 19th century. In the Middle Ages, this building served as the seat of the Vogt and from the 17th century as an inn.

== Notable people ==
- John of Nepomuk (c. 1345 – 1393), saint
- Augustin Němejc (1861–1938), painter
- Marie Poledňáková (1941–2022), film director and screenwriter; raised here

== Twin towns – sister cities ==
Nepomuk is twinned with:

- Anykščiai, Lithuania
- Bušince, Slovakia
- Hukvaldy, Czech Republic
- Kemnath, Germany
- Krupina, Slovakia
- Omiš, Croatia
- Roermond, Netherlands
- São João Nepomuceno, Brazil
