= Smečno =

- Town
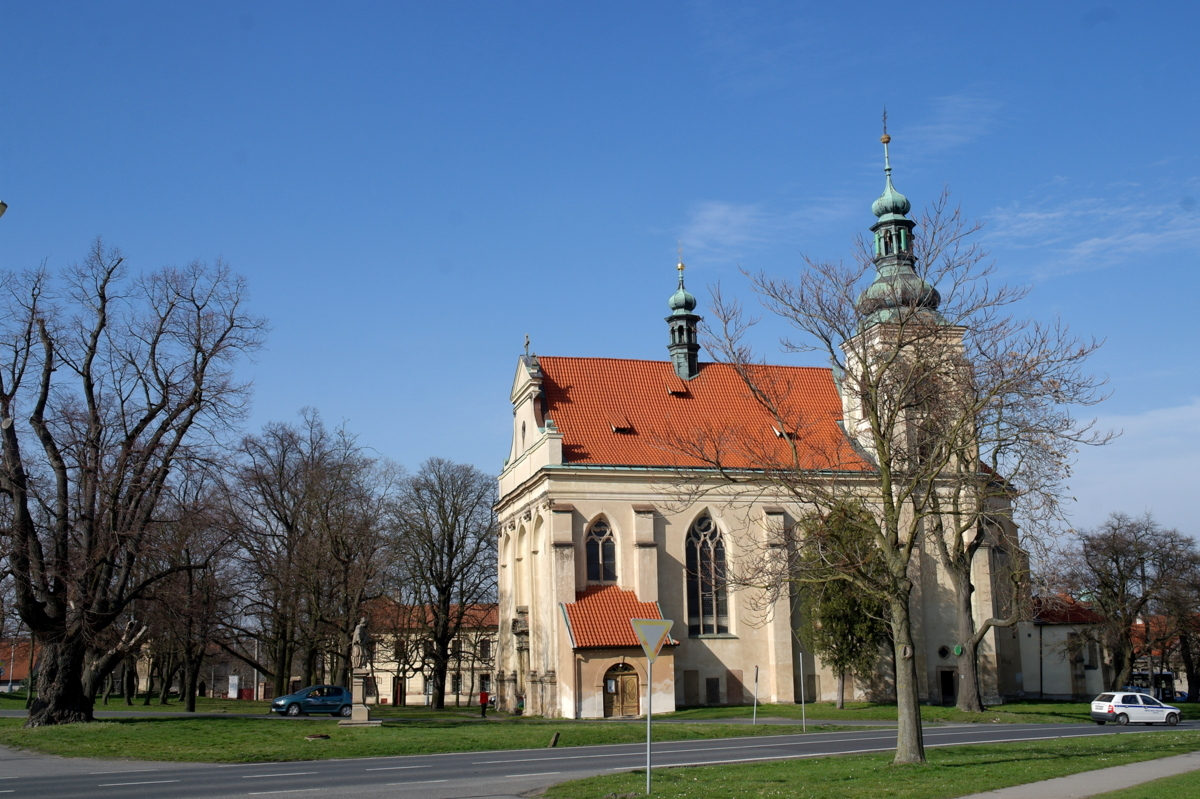
- Church of the Holy Trinity

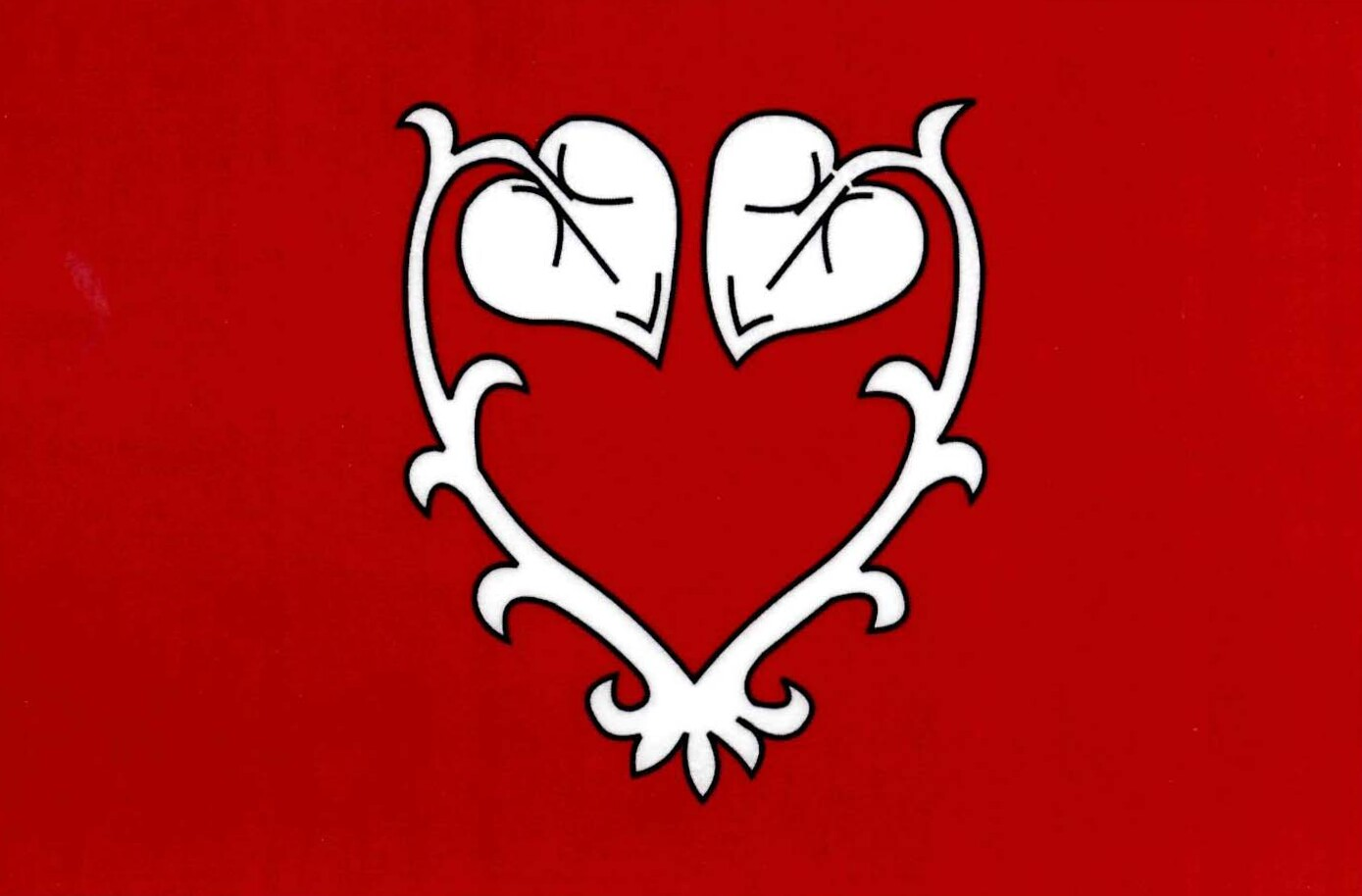
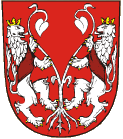
- Flag Coat of arms

- Location in the Czech Republic
- Coordinates: 50°11′19″N 14°2′26″E
- Country: Czech Republic
- Region: Central Bohemian
- District: Kladno
- First mentioned: 1252

Government
  - Mayor: Tomáš Burda

Area
  - Total: 9.59 km^{2} (3.70 sq mi)
- Elevation: 372 m (1,220 ft)

Population (2026-01-01)
  - Total: 1,985
  - Density: 207/km^{2} (536/sq mi)
- Time zone: UTC+1 (CET)
  - Summer (DST): UTC+2 (CEST)
- Postal code: 273 05
- Website: www.smecno.cz

Smečno (Czech pronunciation: [ˈsmɛtʃno]) is a town in Kladno District in the Central Bohemian Region of the Czech Republic. It has about 2,000 inhabitants. The historic town centre is well preserved and is protected as an urban monument zone.

== Etymology ==
The name is derived from the Czech word smyk, i.e. 'skid'. There was probably a dreaded steep road where there was a risk of slipping.

== Geography ==
Smečno is located about 6 kilometres (4 mi) northwest of Kladno and 23 km (14 mi) northwest of Prague. The eastern part of the municipal territory with the built-up area lies in the Prague Plateau and the western part lies in the Džbán range. The highest point is at 425 m (1,394 ft) above sea level.

== History ==
The first written mention of a fortress in Smečno is from 1252. In 1510, Smečno became a market town and in 1515 it became a town.

== Demographics ==
Historical population

Year	Pop.	±%
1869	1,490	—
1880	1,547	+3.8%
1890	1,981	+28.1%
1900	2,531	+27.8%
1910	3,083	+21.8%

Year	Pop.	±%
1921	2,953	−4.2%
1930	2,930	−0.8%
1950	2,405	−17.9%
1961	2,260	−6.0%
1970	1,987	−12.1%

Year	Pop.	±%
1980	1,788	−10.0%
1991	1,646	−7.9%
2001	1,770	+7.5%
2011	1,872	+5.8%
2021	1,936	+3.4%

Source: Censuses

== Transport ==
There are no railways or major roads running through the municipal territory.

== Sights ==
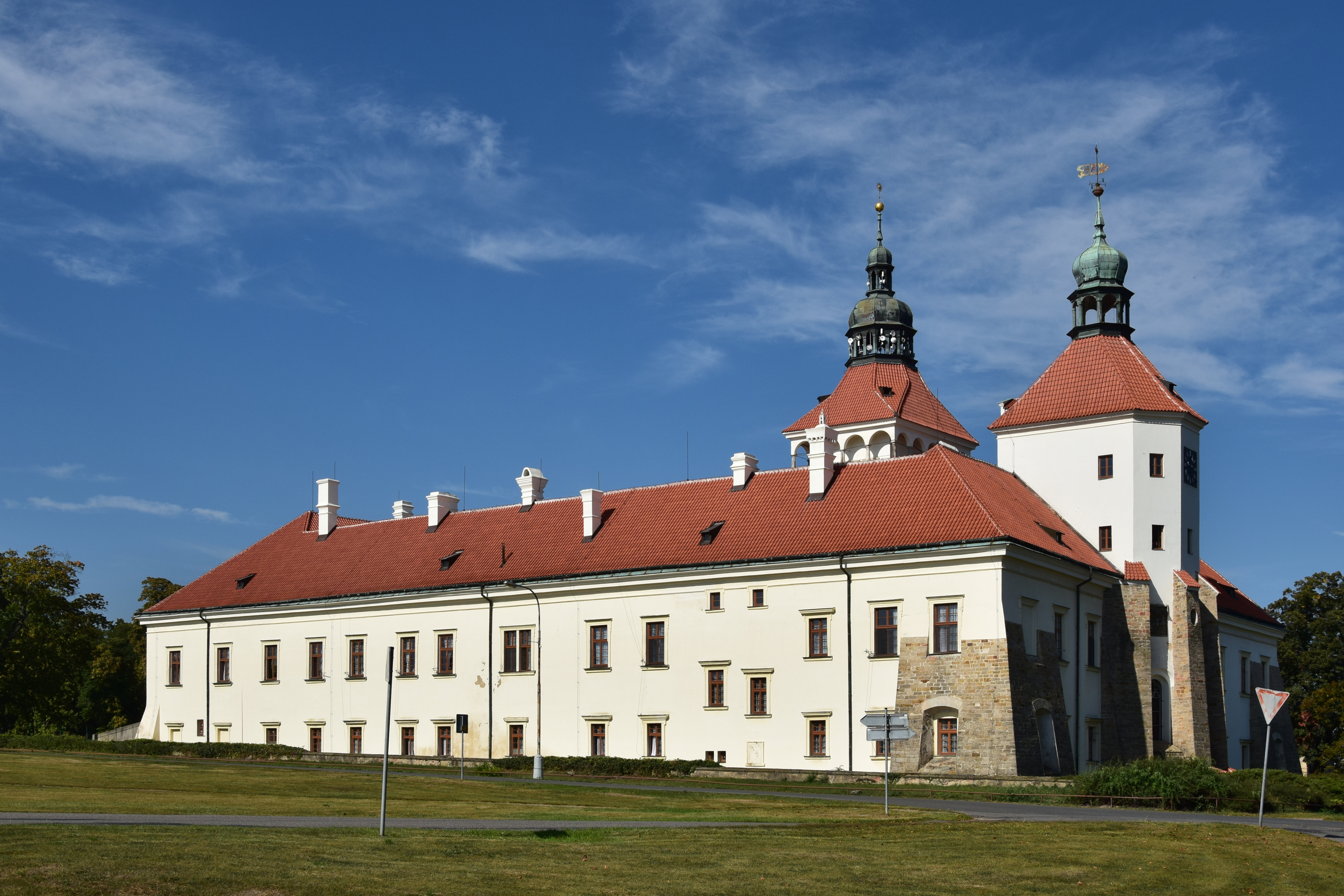
Smečno Castle

The fortress in Smečno was rebuilt into a late Gothic castle in 1460, and in the 16th century, it was rebuilt into a Renaissance arcaded castle with a Gothic tower. Nowadays the Smečno Castle serves as a retirement home and the Institute of Social Care. Its park is open to the public.

The Church of the Holy Trinity is located next to the castle. Originally a medieval church, it was rebuilt and extended in the Renaissance style in 1587. The sacristy dates from the 14th century and originally served as a presbytery.

Smečno Military Open-Air Museum shows fortifications built in 1935–1938. It is fully equipped and armed fortress, one of the few preserved objects of the External Defense of Prague (so-called Prague Line).

== Notable people ==
- Jaroslav Bořita of Martinice (1582–1649), nobleman and a representative of Ferdinand II
- Heinrich Clam-Martinic (1863–1932), Austrian statesman, prime minister of Austro-Hungary in 1916–1917
- Zdeněk Liška (1922–1983), film score composer
