= Martinic family =

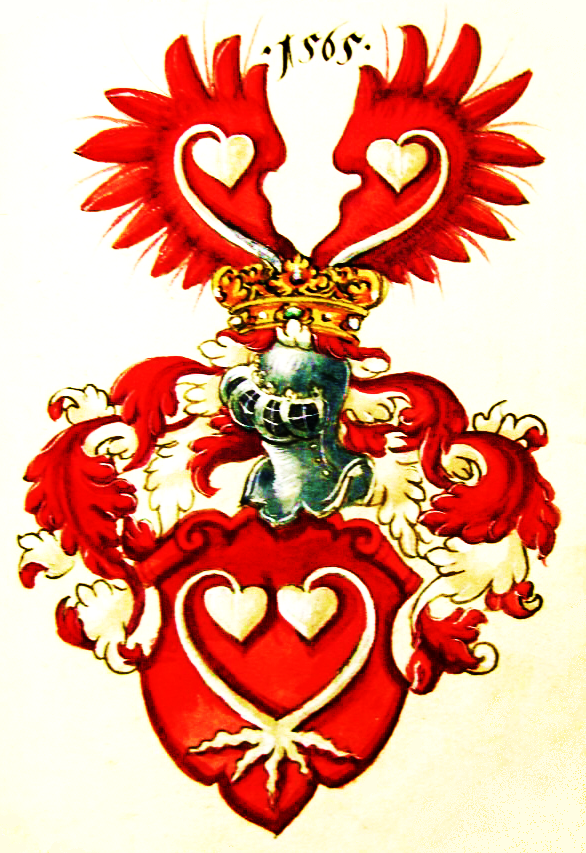
Coat of arms of Martinic family

The Martinic family or House of Martinice (Czech: Martinicové or z Martinic, German: von Martinitz) was a Bohemian noble family, claimed to be descended from the old Vršovci clan. The family have been part of the Bohemian ancient nobility. As of 1322, the family possessed the castle Martinice near Votice in the southern part of Central Bohemia. Members include Jaroslav Bořita of Martinice, who was victim of the 1618 Defenestration of Prague.

The family became extinct in the male line (1788), but the name survived in the Clam-Martinic family, when in 1791 Carl Josef, Count of Clam, a member of the old Austrian noble family Clam, married Maria Anna, Imperial Countess of Martinic. Their descendants include Austrian statesman Heinrich Clam-Martinic.

== Literature ==
- Roman von Prochazka: Genealogisches Handbuch erloschener böhmischer Herrenstandsfamilien, Band I; Rangordnung des böhmischen Fürsten- und Herrenstandes mit der Liste der dreissig ältesten Herrenstandfamilien von Jahr 1501. Verlag Degener & Co, Neustadt an der Aisch 1973, ISBN 3-7686-5002-2, p. 15, Übersicht und Ahnentafel zu Martinic pp. 183, 186.
- Heribert Sturm (Hrsg. im Auftrag des Collegium Carolinum): Biographisches Lexikon zur Geschichte der böhmischen Länder. Oldenbourg Verlag, Munich 1984, ISBN 3-486-52551-4, Vol. II (I–M), pp. 588-589.
- Smetschna (Smecno). In: Hans-Ulrich Engel: Burgen und Schlösser in Böhmen. Nach alten Vorlagen. 3. Ausgabe. Wolfgang Weidlich, Frankfurt am Main 1978, ISBN 3-8035-8013-7, pp. 95-96, Abbildung p. 217
- Grafen von Martinic Regierer des Hauses Smetschna. In: Die Wappen des böhmischen Adels. Siebmacher´s grosses Wappenbuch Band 30. Bauer und Raspe, Neustadt an der Aisch 1979, ISBN 3-87947-030-8, p. 145, Wappen auf Tafel 68. (reprographischer Nachdruck von Siebmacher's Wappenbuch, Nuremberg Vol. IV, 9th Abteilung, 1886.)
- Martinic-Palais. In: Karl Plicka, Emanuel Poche: Ein Bildführer Prag. Parorama, Prague 1982, p. 60.
