= Úslava =

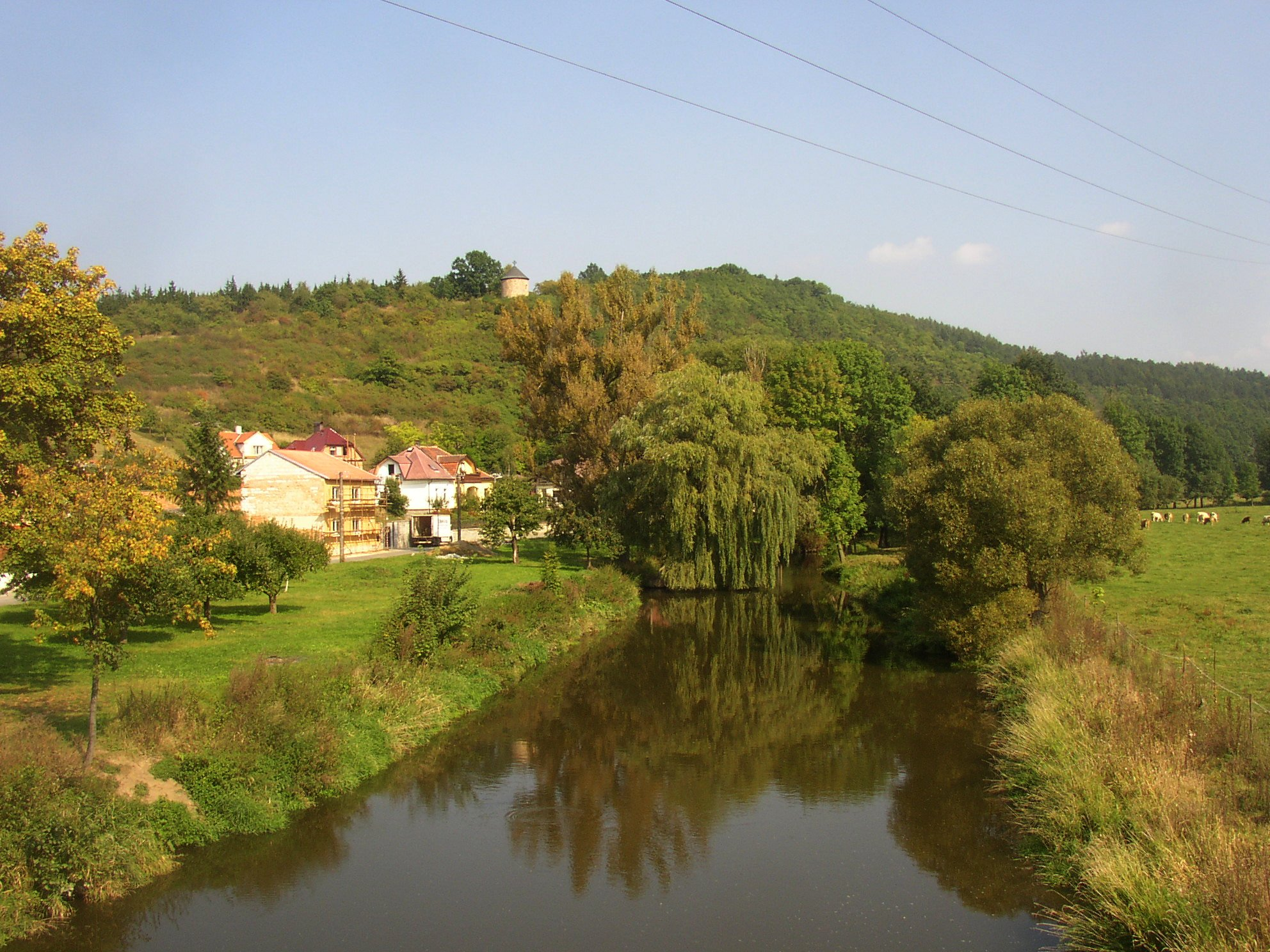
- The Úslava in Starý Plzenec

Location
- Country: Czech Republic
- Region: Plzeň

Physical characteristics
- Source
  - location: Kolinec, Blatná Uplands
  - coordinates: 49°20′13″N 13°24′8″E
  - elevation: 637 m (2,090 ft)
- Mouth
  - location: Berounka
  - coordinates: 49°45′46″N 13°24′47″E
  - elevation: 299 m (981 ft)
- Length: 96.3 km (59.8 mi)
- Basin size: 755.7 km^{2} (291.8 sq mi)
- Discharge
  - average: 3.55 m^{3}/s (125 cu ft/s)

Basin features
- Progression: Berounka→ Vltava→ Elbe→ North Sea

The Úslava (Czech pronunciation: [ˈuːslava]) is a river in the Czech Republic, a right tributary of the Berounka River. It flows through the Plzeň Region. It is 96.3 km (59.8 mi) long.

== Etymology ==
Until the early 18th century, the river was called Bradlava. The name first appeared in 1266 as Bradaua. In the following centuries, the name was also written as Radawa, Bradava, Brádava and Bradlavka. In 1712, Cistercian cartographer Mauritius Vogt confused the Bradlava with the Úhlava in his book, and also made a typographical error when he wrote it as Úslava. Since then, the name Úslava has been used.

== Characteristic ==
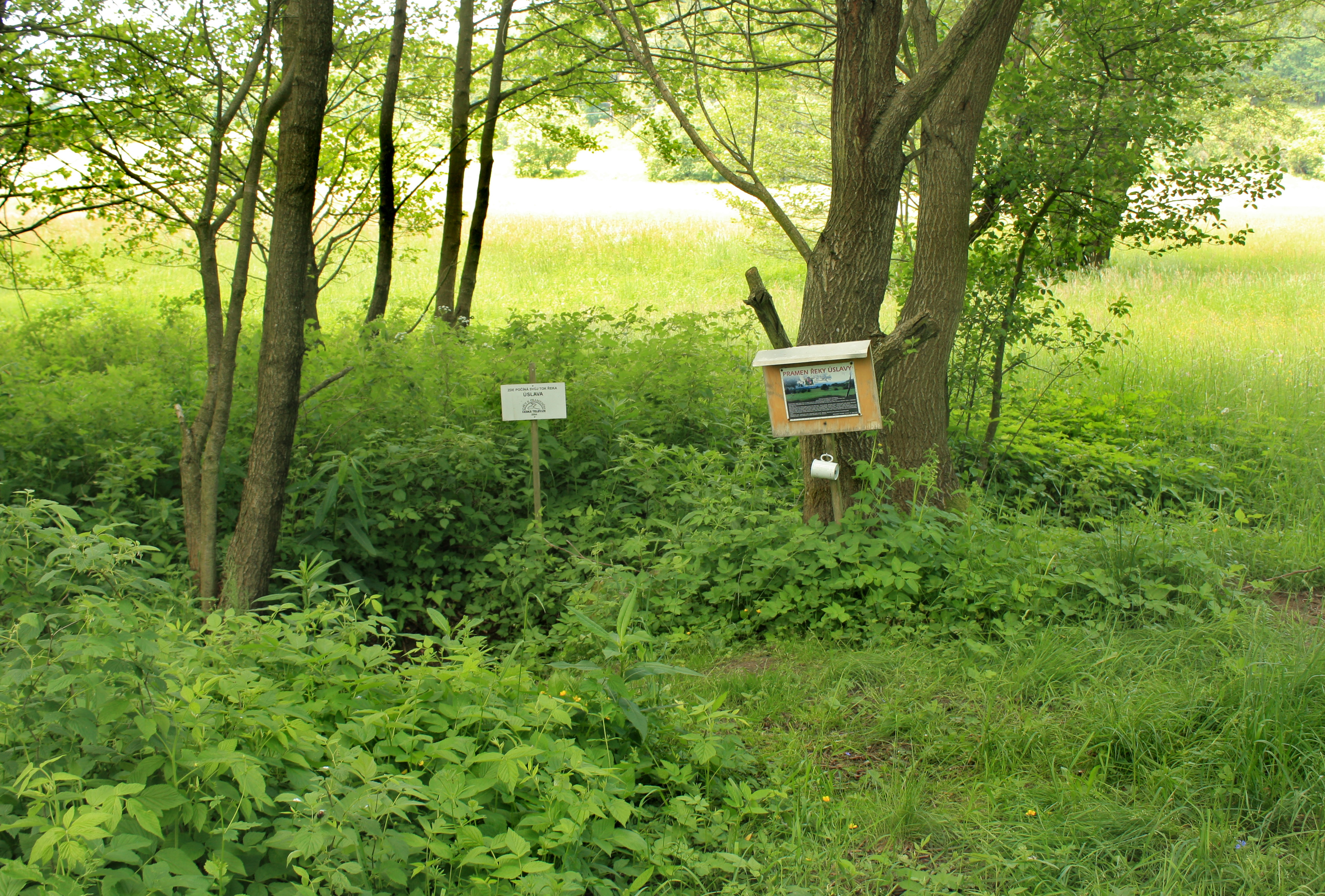
Spring of the Úslava

The Úslava originates in the territory of Kolinec in the Blatná Uplands at an elevation of 637 m (2,090 ft), on the slope of the Zálužnice mountain, and flows to Plzeň, where it enters the Berounka River at an elevation of 299 m (981 ft). It is 96.3 km (59.8 mi) long. Its drainage basin has an area of 755.7 km^{2} (291.8 sq mi).

The longest tributaries of the Úslava are:

Tributary	Length (km)	River km	Side
Bradava	21.7	26.1	right
Myslívský potok	19.1	53.1	right
Kornatický potok	17.8	23.5	right
Podhrázský potok	13.5	33.4	left
Tůně	11.8	66.9	right
Chocenický potok	10.7	37.9	left

== Course ==
The river flows through the municipal territories of Kolinec, Číhaň, Zavlekov, Hnačov, Plánice, Újezd u Plánice, Mlýnské Struhadlo, Neurazy, Žinkovy, Prádlo, Klášter, Vrčeň, Srby, Ždírec, Blovice, Zdemyslice, Žákava, Nezvěstice, Šťáhlavy, Starý Plzenec and Plzeň.

== Bodies of water ==
There are 78 bodies of water larger than 1 ha in the basin area. The largest of them are the fishponds Kovčínský with an area of 99 ha (240 acres) and Myslivský with an area of 63 ha (160 acres). Many fishponds were founded directly the Úslava; the largest of them are Hnačovský, Žinkovský and Labuť.

== Tourism ==
For most of the year, the Úslava is not suitable for river tourism due to lack of water.

== See also ==
- List of rivers of the Czech Republic
