= Ždírec =

Ždírec may refer to places in the Czech Republic:

- Ždírec (Česká Lípa District), a municipality and village in the Liberec Region
- Ždírec (Havlíčkův Brod District), a municipality and village in the Vysočina Region
- Ždírec (Jihlava District), a municipality and village in the Vysočina Region
- Ždírec (Plzeň-South District), a municipality and village in the Plzeň Region
- Ždírec nad Doubravou, a town in the Vysočina Region
