= Srby =

Srby may refer to places in the Czech Republic:

- Srby (Domažlice District), a municipality and village in the Plzeň Region
- Srby (Plzeň-South District), a municipality and village in the Plzeň Region
- Srby, a village and part of Tuchlovice in the Central Bohemian Region
