= Cihan =

Cihan may refer to:

== Name ==
=== Given name ===
- Cihan Alptekin (1947–1972), Turkish revolutionary and militant
- Cihan Can, Turkish footballer
- Cihan Haspolatlı, Turkish footballer
- Cihan Kaptan, German footballer
- Cihan Özkara, German-Azerbaijani footballer
- Cihan Ünal, Turkish actor
- Cihan Yılmaz, Turkish footballer

=== Surname ===
- Veysel Cihan, Turkish footballer

== Places ==
- Číhaň, a municipality ad village in the Czech Republic

== Media ==
- Cihan News Agency in Turkey
