= Kamenné Žehrovice =

- Municipality
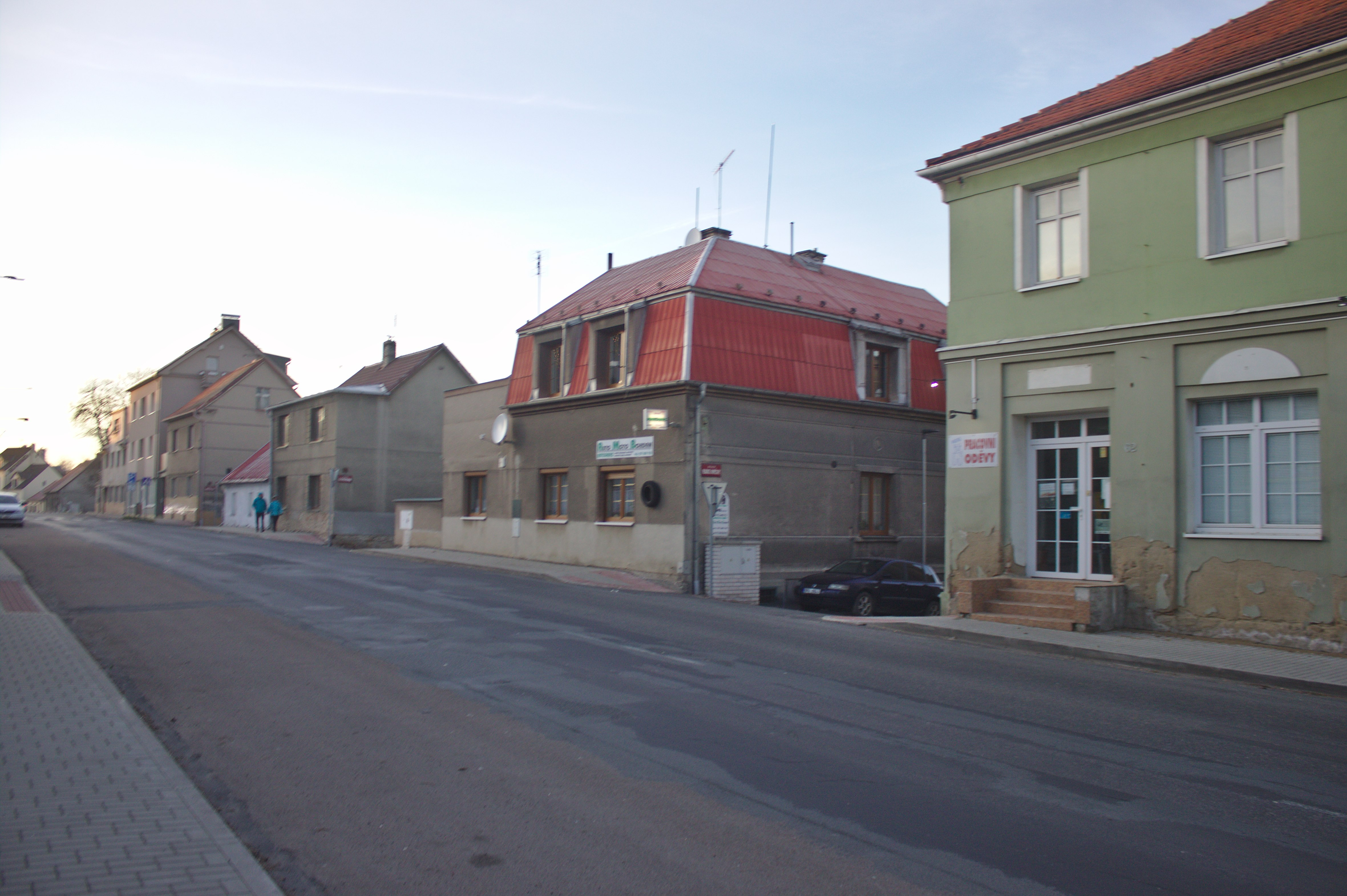
- Main street

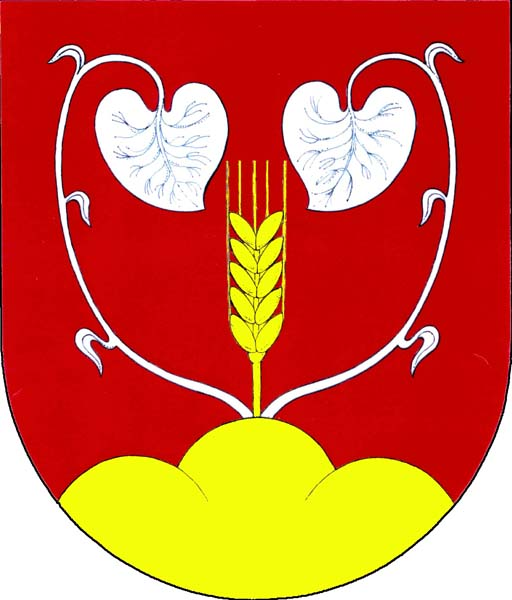
- Flag Coat of arms

- Location in the Czech Republic
- Coordinates: 50°7′37″N 14°1′5″E
- Country: Czech Republic
- Region: Central Bohemian
- District: Kladno
- First mentioned: 1277

Area
  - Total: 9.16 km^{2} (3.54 sq mi)
- Elevation: 387 m (1,270 ft)

Population (2026-01-01)
  - Total: 1,636
  - Density: 179/km^{2} (463/sq mi)
- Time zone: UTC+1 (CET)
  - Summer (DST): UTC+2 (CEST)
- Postal code: 273 01
- Website: www.kamennezehrovice.cz

Kamenné Žehrovice is a municipality and village in Kladno District in the Central Bohemian Region of the Czech Republic. It has about 1,600 inhabitants.

== Etymology ==
The name Žehrovice is derived from the personal name Žehra, meaning "the village of Žehra's people". The prefix Kamenné means 'stone' and refers to stone mining.

== Geography ==
Kamenné Žehrovice is located about 6 kilometres (4 mi) west of Kladno and 24 km (15 mi) west of Prague. The municipal territory lies mostly in the Křivoklát Highlands, only the northern part extends into the Prague Plateau. The highest point is at 436 m (1,430 ft) above sea level.

The Loděnice River flows through the municipality. On the river is the fishpond Turyňský rybník, which has an area of 51 ha (130 acres) and is among the largest bodies of water in the region. It was originally a small pond, extended in 1950.

== History ==
The first written mention of Kamenné Žehrovice is from 1277, when King Ottokar II donated the village to the Ostrov Monastery in Davle. From the Middle Ages until the 20th century, the village was known for quarrying stone, which was also used in the construction of the Charles Bridge and St. Vitus Cathedral. In the 14th century, Kamenné Žehrovice became the property of the Metropolitan Chapter at Saint Vitus in Prague. In 1420, during the Hussite Wars, the village was acquired by the Kladenský of Kladno family. In 1543, it was bought by the Martinic family. From 1558 until the establishment of an independent municipality in 1849, the village was part of the Smečno estate.

== Demographics ==
Historical population

Year	Pop.	±%
1869	1,030	—
1880	1,024	−0.6%
1890	1,202	+17.4%
1900	1,387	+15.4%
1910	1,753	+26.4%

Year	Pop.	±%
1921	1,795	+2.4%
1930	1,993	+11.0%
1950	1,999	+0.3%
1961	1,685	−15.7%
1970	1,583	−6.1%

Year	Pop.	±%
1980	1,541	−2.7%
1991	1,530	−0.7%
2001	1,568	+2.5%
2011	1,729	+10.3%
2021	1,644	−4.9%

Source: Censuses

== Transport ==
The D6 motorway from Prague to Karlovy Vary runs through the municipality.

Kamenné Žehrovice is located on the railway line Kladno–Rakovník The train station is situated outside the built-up area.

== Sights ==
Among the protected cultural monuments are a calvary from 1838, two statues of saint from the 18th century, a rural homestead from the turn of the 18th and 19th centuries, and an archaeological site of the former village of Německá Lhota.

A landmark in the centre of Kamenné Žehrovice is the Chapel of the Name of the Virgin Mary. It is a modern building, dating from 2009.
