= Žákava =

- Municipality
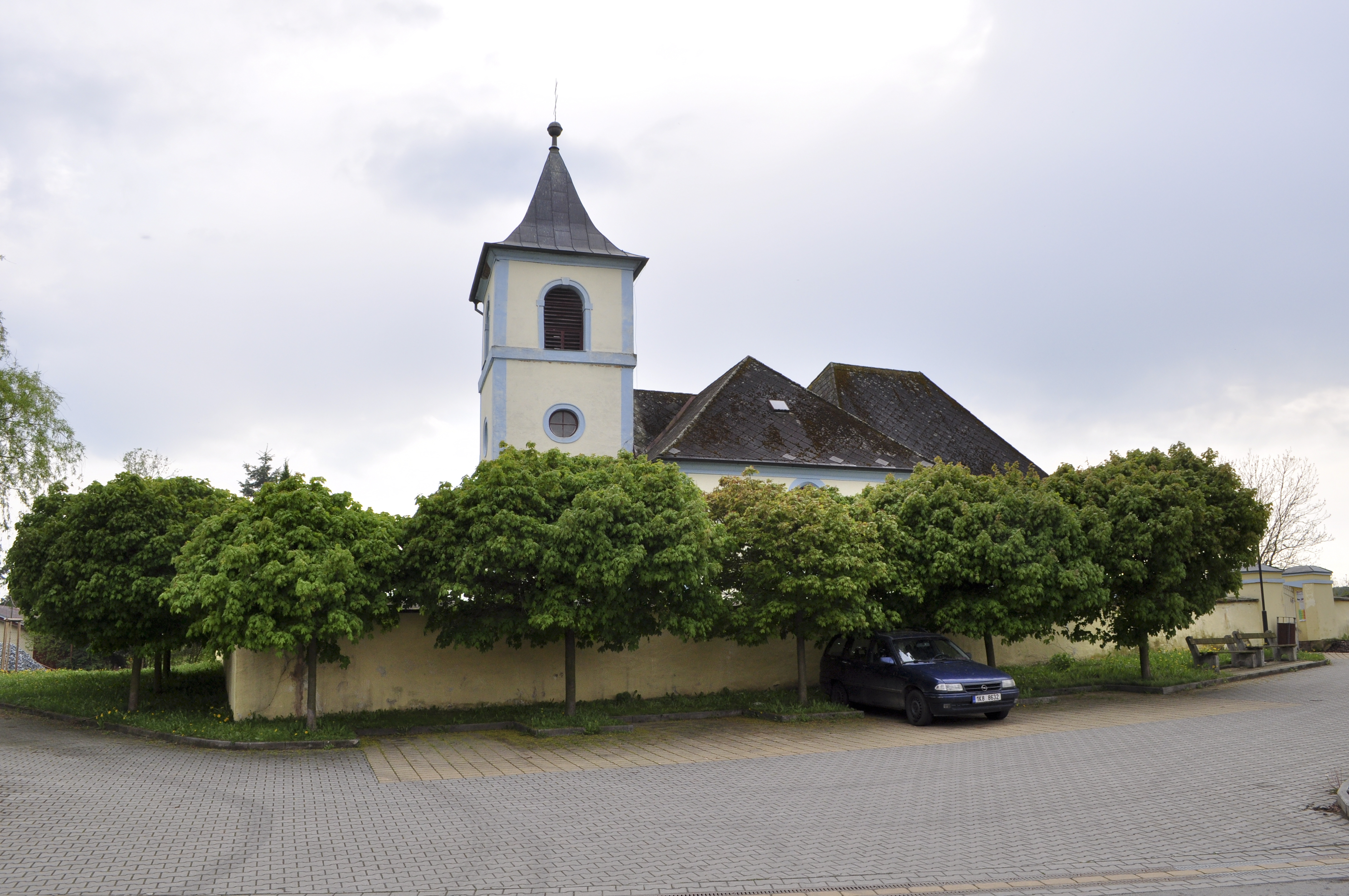
- Church of Saint Lawrence

- Flag Coat of arms

- Location in the Czech Republic
- Coordinates: 49°37′48″N 13°31′51″E
- Country: Czech Republic
- Region: Plzeň
- District: Plzeň-South
- First mentioned: 1350

Area
  - Total: 9.47 km^{2} (3.66 sq mi)
- Elevation: 362 m (1,188 ft)

Population (2026-01-01)
  - Total: 491
  - Density: 51.8/km^{2} (134/sq mi)
- Time zone: UTC+1 (CET)
  - Summer (DST): UTC+2 (CEST)
- Postal code: 332 04
- Website: www.zakava.cz

Žákava is a municipality and village in Plzeň-South District in the Plzeň Region of the Czech Republic. It has about 500 inhabitants.

== Geography ==
Žákava is located about 15 kilometres (9 mi) southeast of Plzeň. It lies in the Švihov Highlands. The highest point is the Sváreč hill at 495 m (1,624 ft) above sea level. The village is located between the Úslava River and Bradava Stream.

== Demographics ==
Historical population
Year	Pop.	±%
1869	509	—
1880	559	+9.8%
1890	527	−5.7%
1900	513	−2.7%
1910	542	+5.7%
1921	560	+3.3%
1930	589	+5.2%
1950	534	−9.3%
1961	537	+0.6%
1970	447	−16.8%
1980	395	−11.6%
1991	353	−10.6%
2001	370	+4.8%
2011	403	+8.9%
2021	475	+17.9%
Source: Censuses
