= Hnačov =

- Municipality
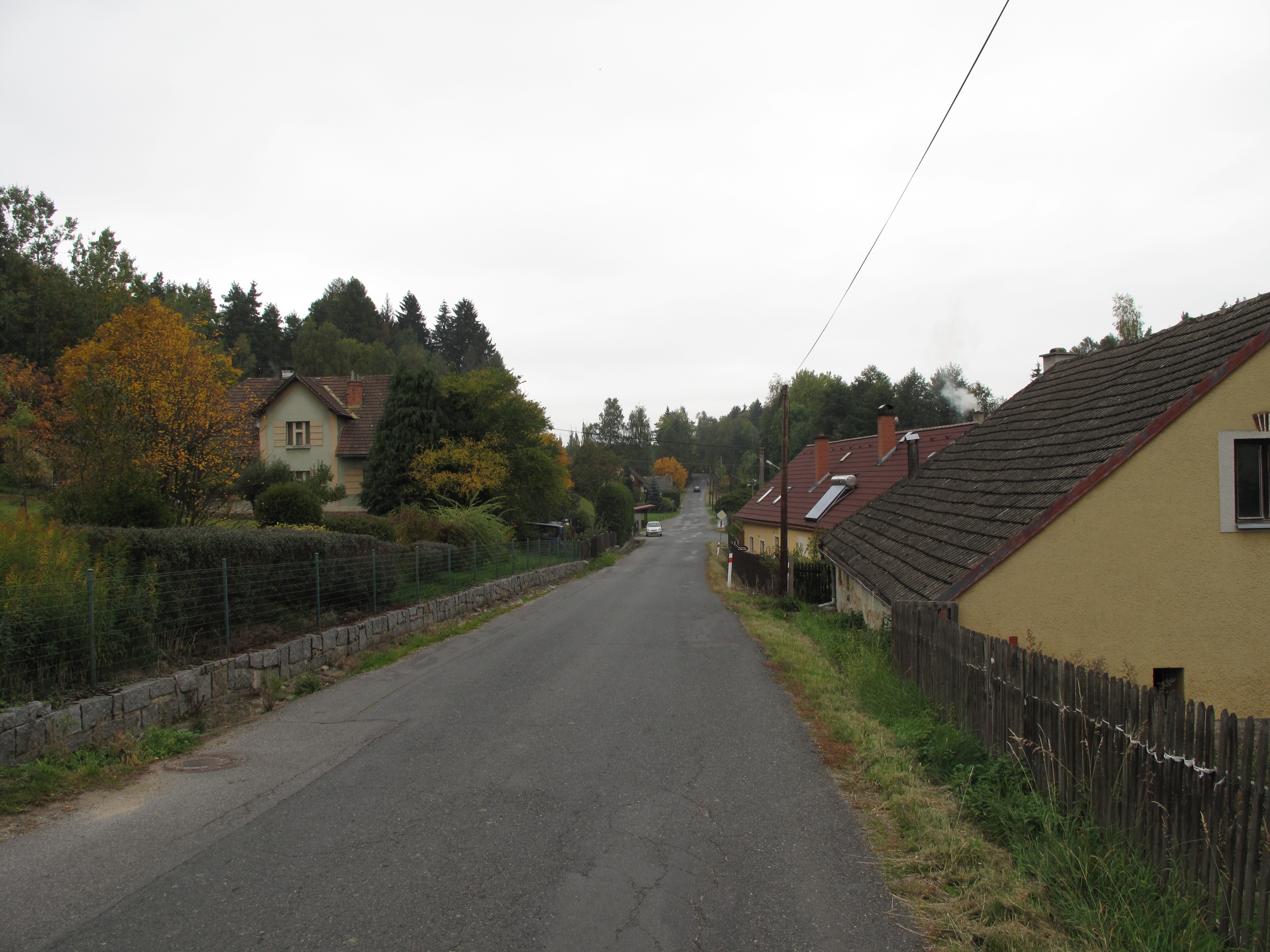
- Main road

- Location in the Czech Republic
- Coordinates: 49°21′43″N 13°28′54″E
- Country: Czech Republic
- Region: Plzeň
- District: Klatovy
- First mentioned: 1411

Area
  - Total: 3.15 km^{2} (1.22 sq mi)
- Elevation: 565 m (1,854 ft)

Population (2026-01-01)
  - Total: 83
  - Density: 26/km^{2} (68/sq mi)
- Time zone: UTC+1 (CET)
  - Summer (DST): UTC+2 (CEST)
- Postal code: 340 34
- Website: www.hnacov.cz

Hnačov is a municipality and village in Klatovy District in the Plzeň Region of the Czech Republic. It has about 80 inhabitants.

== Etymology ==
The name is probably derived from the surname Hnáč, meaning "Hnáč's (court)". The name was alternatively written as Hnáčov.

== Geography ==
Hnačov is located about 14 kilometres (9 mi) east of Klatovy and 41 km (25 mi) south of Plzeň. It lies in the Blatná Uplands. The highest point is the hill Zbudov at 645 m (2,116 ft) above sea level. The Úslava River flows through the municipality.

The village is situated on the shore of the fishpond Hnačovský rybník, which is the second largest pond in the Plzeň Region with an area of 68 km^{2} (26 sq mi). Established in 1613, it is used for fish farming and recreational purposes.

== History ==
The first written mention of Hnačov is from 1411.

== Demographics ==
Historical population

Year	Pop.	±%
1869	213	—
1880	226	+6.1%
1890	188	−16.8%
1900	210	+11.7%
1910	238	+13.3%

Year	Pop.	±%
1921	204	−14.3%
1930	195	−4.4%
1950	141	−27.7%
1961	132	−6.4%
1970	115	−12.9%

Year	Pop.	±%
1980	107	−7.0%
1991	94	−12.1%
2001	79	−16.0%
2011	96	+21.5%
2021	85	−11.5%

Source: Censuses

== Transport ==
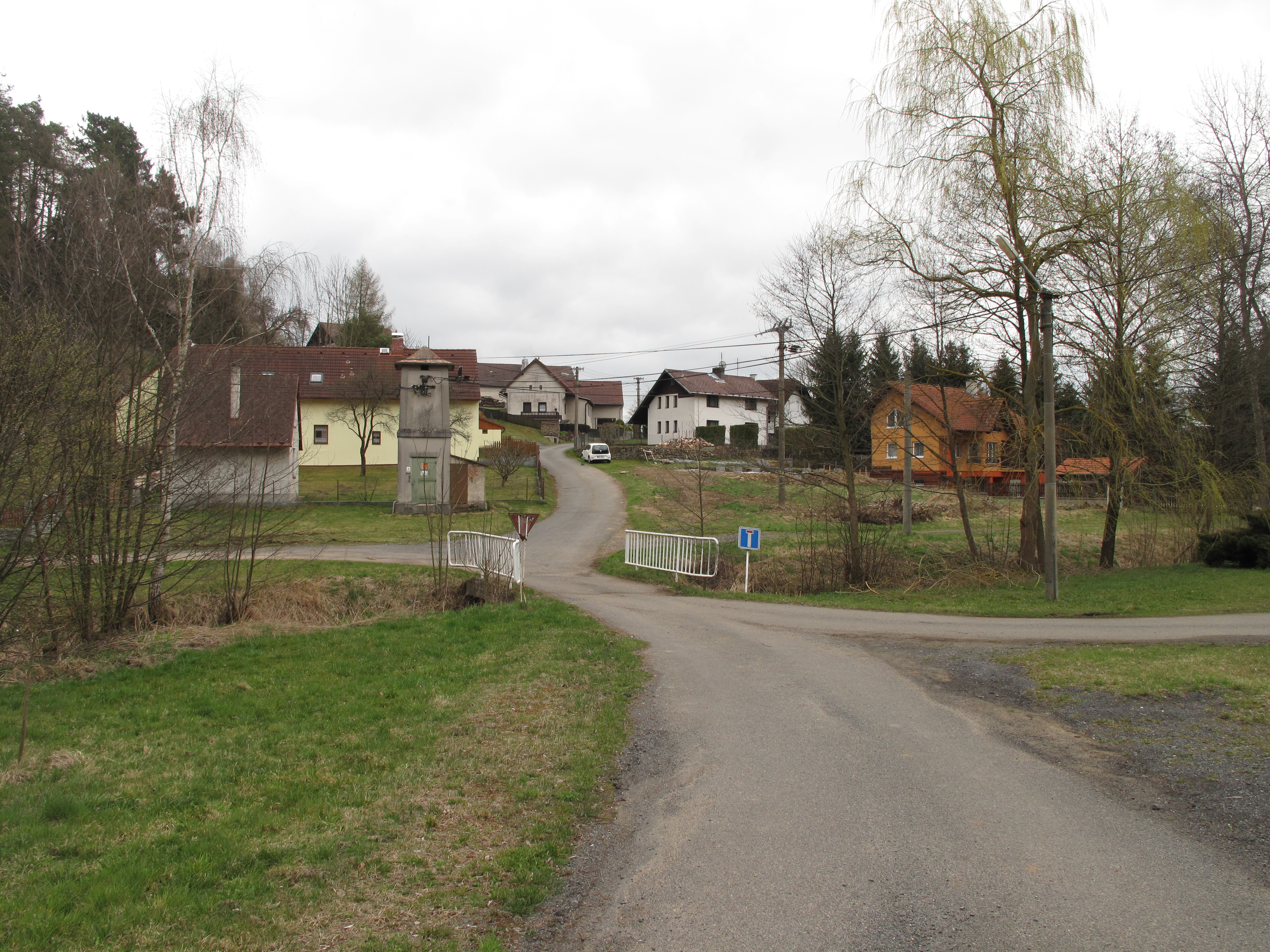
Bridge over the Úslava

There are no railways or major roads passing through the municipality.

== Sights ==
There are no protected cultural monuments in the municipality. A landmark is the chapel in the centre of Hnačov.
