= Nová Ves u Nepomuka =

- Village
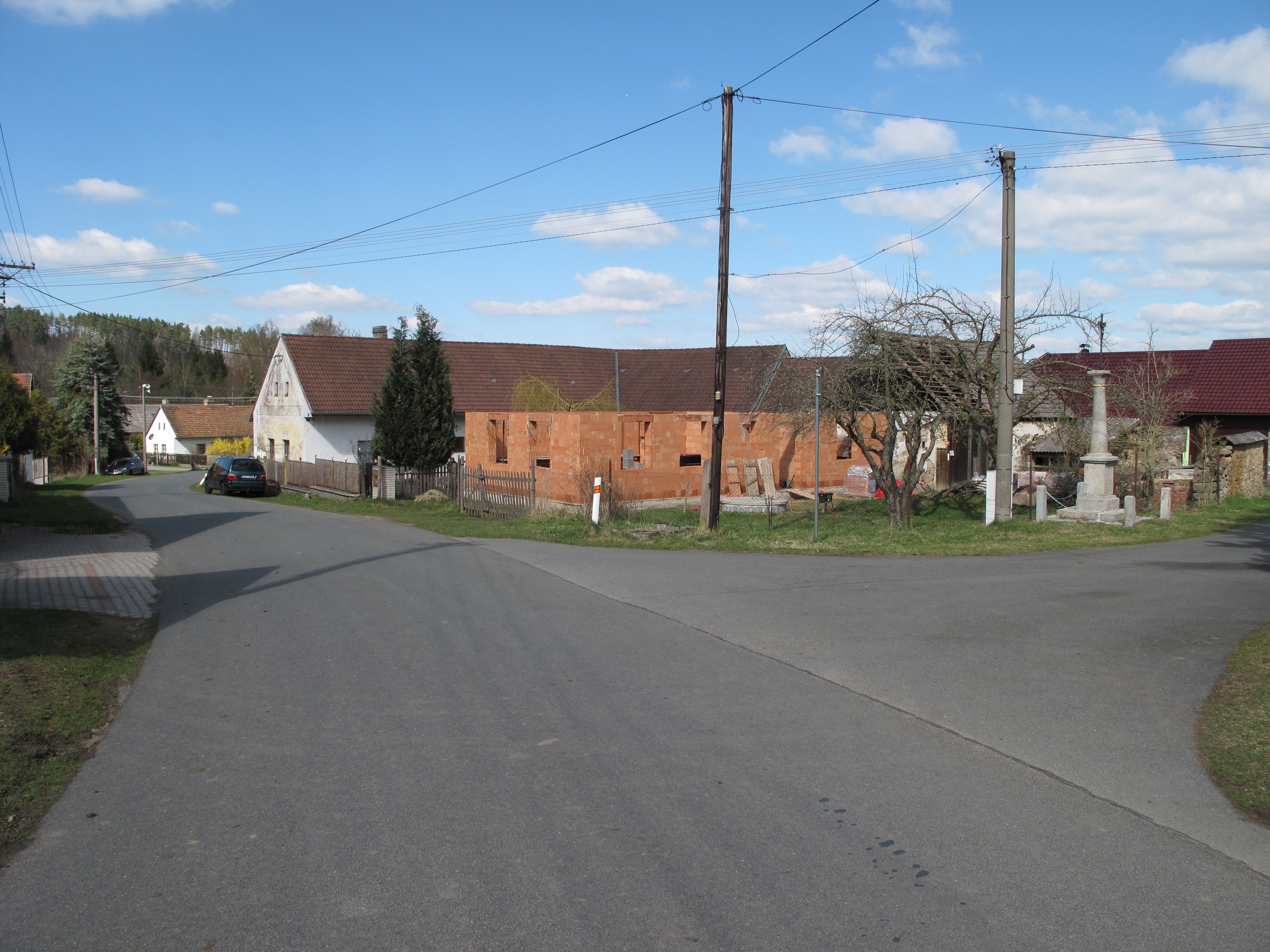
- Centre of Nová Ves u Nepomuka

- Location in the Czech Republic
- Coordinates: 49°27′55″N 13°32′8″E
- Country: Czech Republic
- Region: Plzeň
- District: Plzeň-South
- Municipality: Neurazy
- First mentioned: 1551

Area
  - Total: 3.43 km^{2} (1.32 sq mi)
- Elevation: 498 m (1,634 ft)

Population (2021)
  - Total: 72
  - Density: 21/km^{2} (54/sq mi)
- Time zone: UTC+1 (CET)
  - Summer (DST): UTC+2 (CEST)
- Postal code: 335 55

Nová Ves u Nepomuka is a village and administrative part of Neurazy in Plzeň-South District in the Plzeň Region of the Czech Republic. It has about 70 inhabitants.

== History ==
The first written mention of Nová Ves u Nepomuka is from 1551.
