= Klikařov =

Coordinates: 49°27′07″N 13°30′27″E

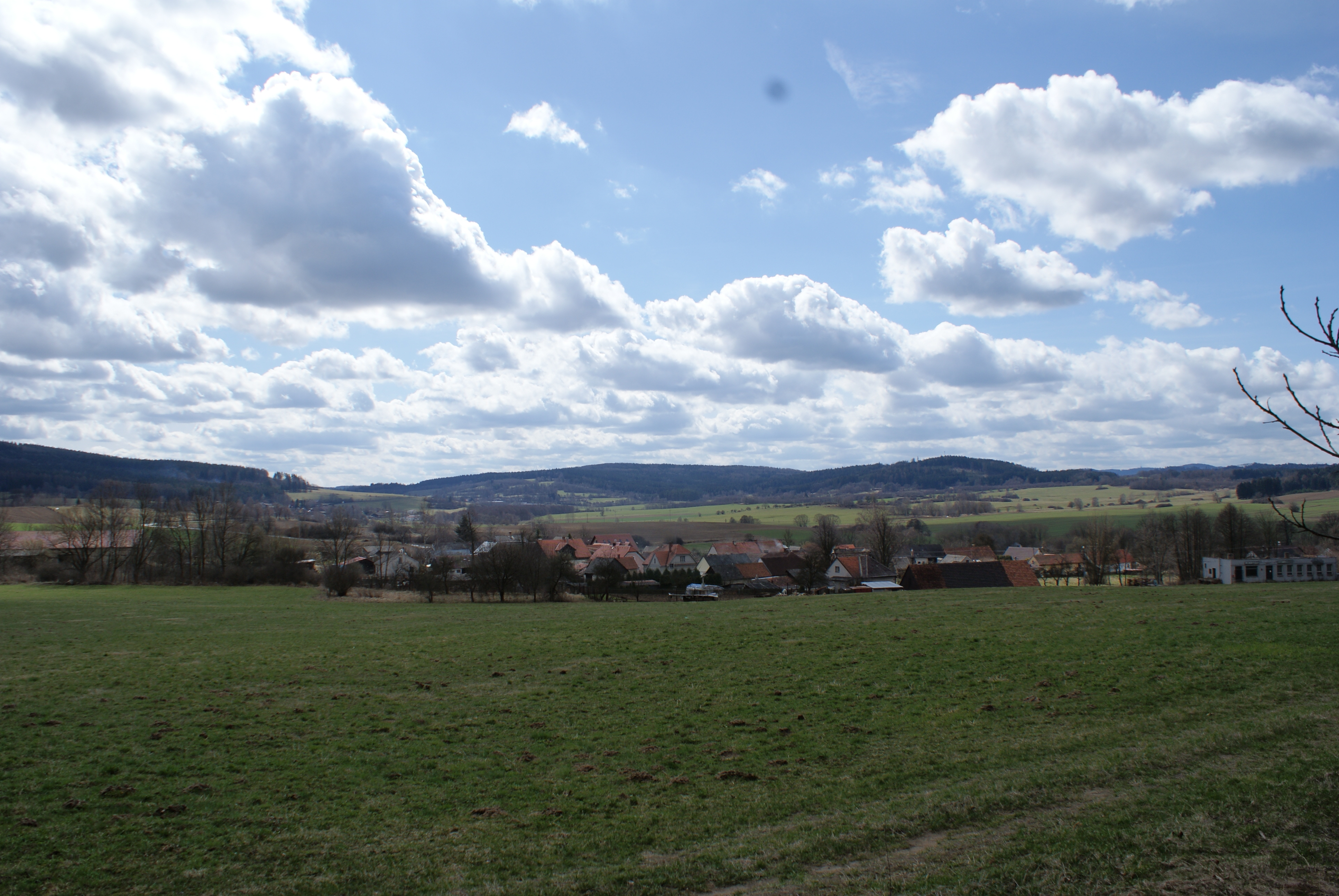
- Klikařov from the distance
- Interactive map of Klikařov

Klikařov is a village in the southeast of the Czech Republic. It is part of Neurazy municipality. In 2011 there were 72 inhabitants and 52 houses dedicated to living. The village was mentioned in the documents for the first time in 1551.

== Gallery ==
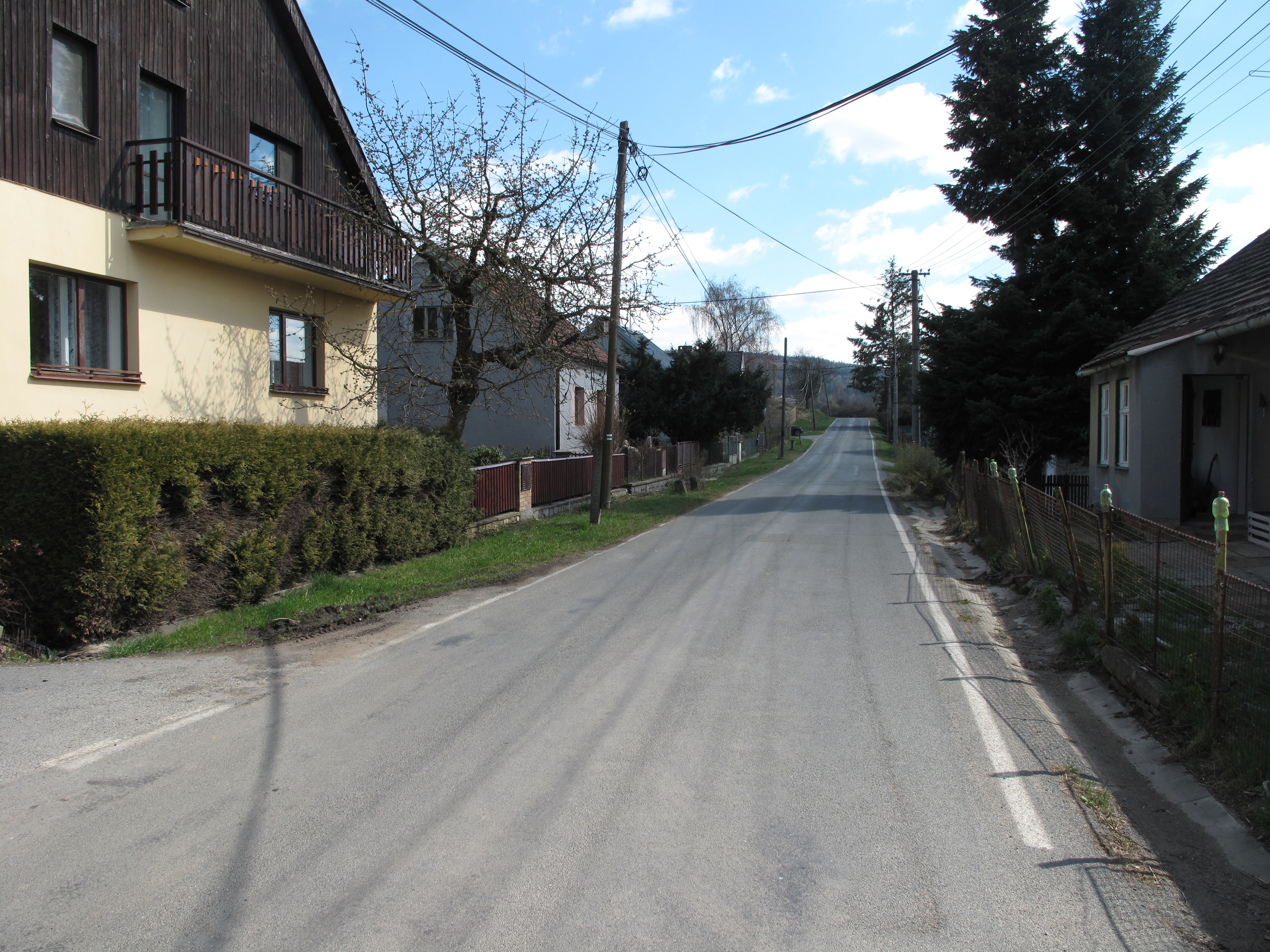
Main road

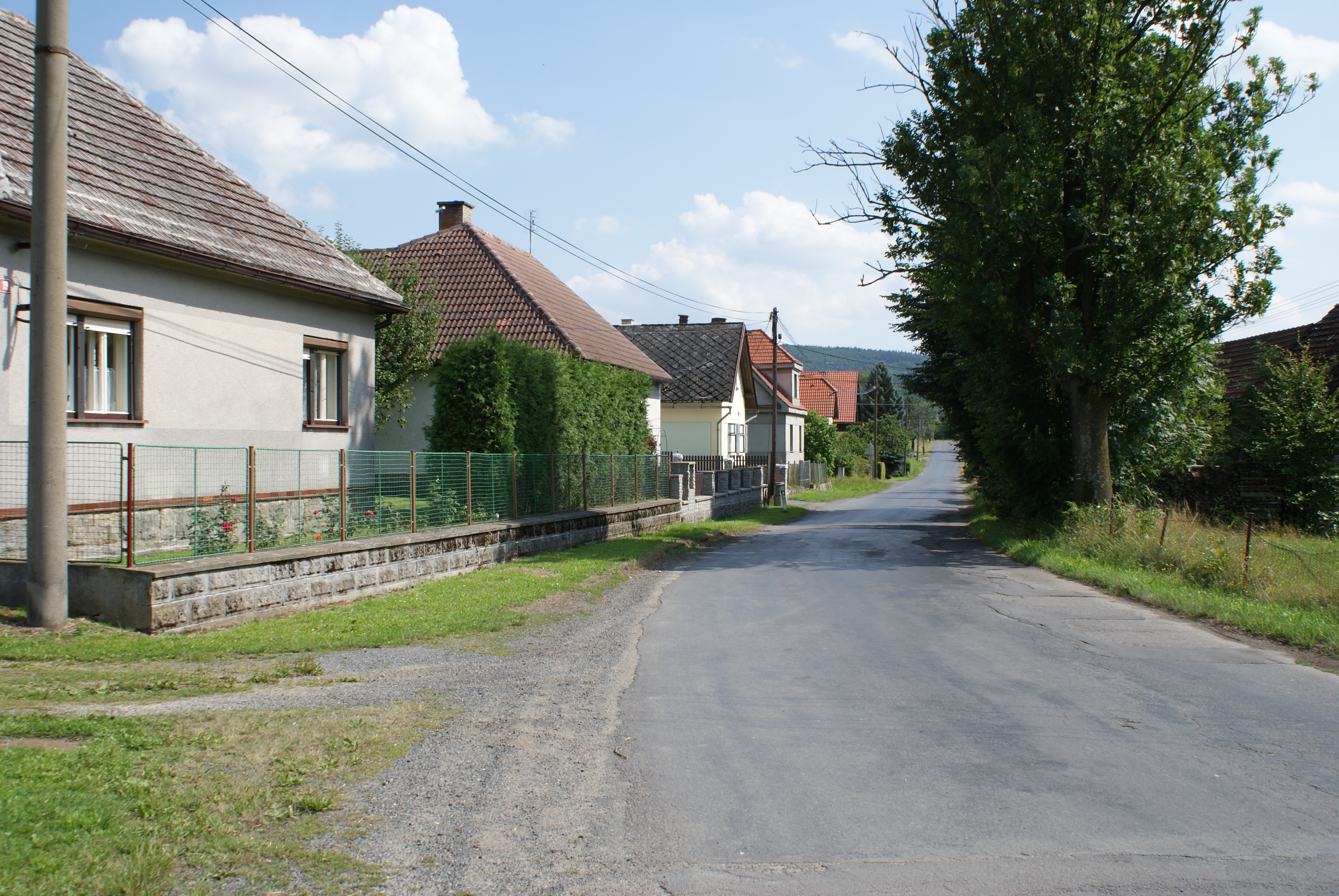
Main road
