= Turyňský rybník =

Pond in the Czech Republic

Coordinates: 50°8′15″N 14°1′25″E

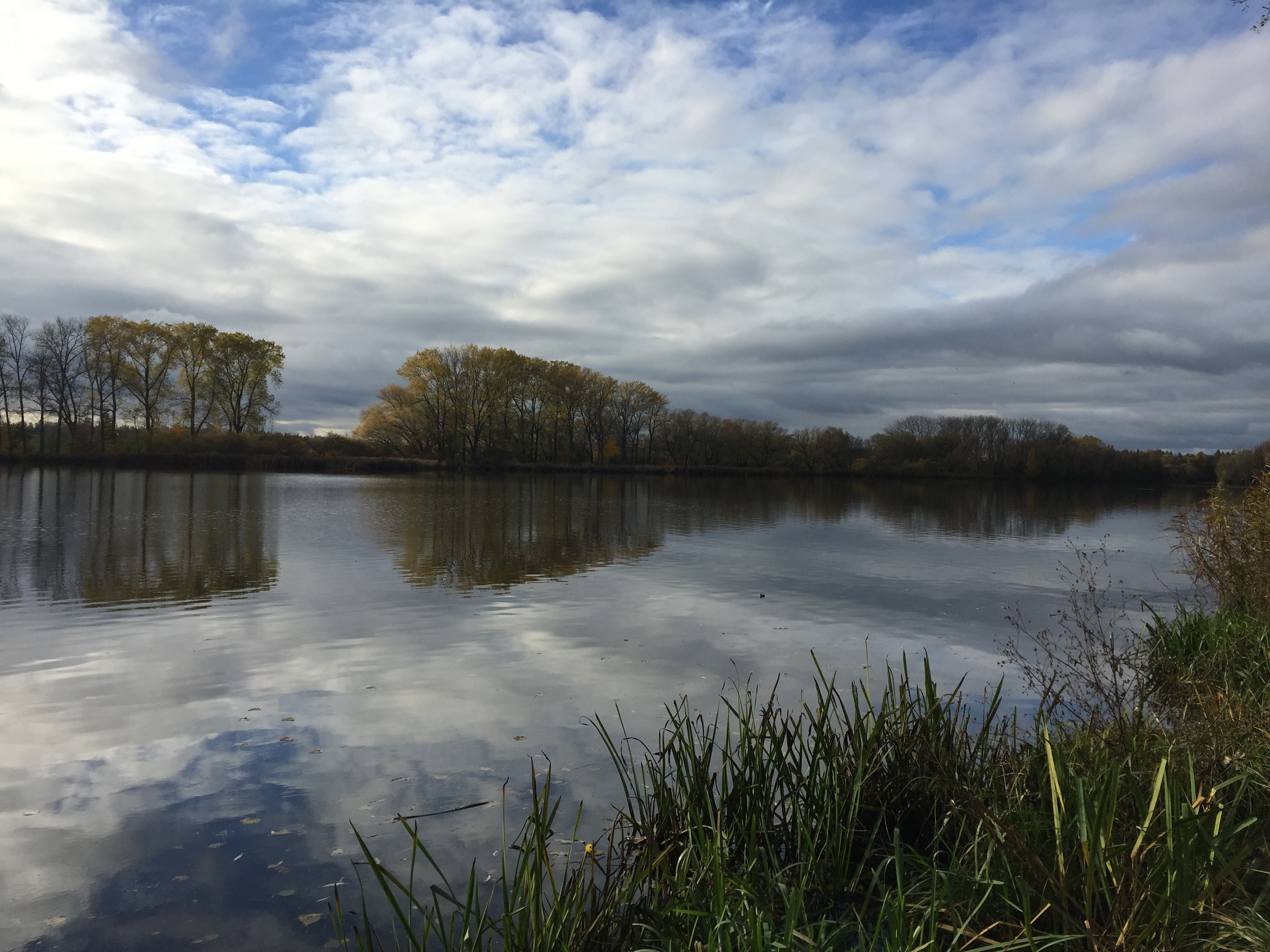
Northern part of Turyňský rybník

Turyňský rybník (also called Záplavy) is a fish pond in the Central Bohemian Region of the Czech Republic. With an area of 51 ha (130 acres), it is the largest body of water in Kladno District.

== Etymology ==
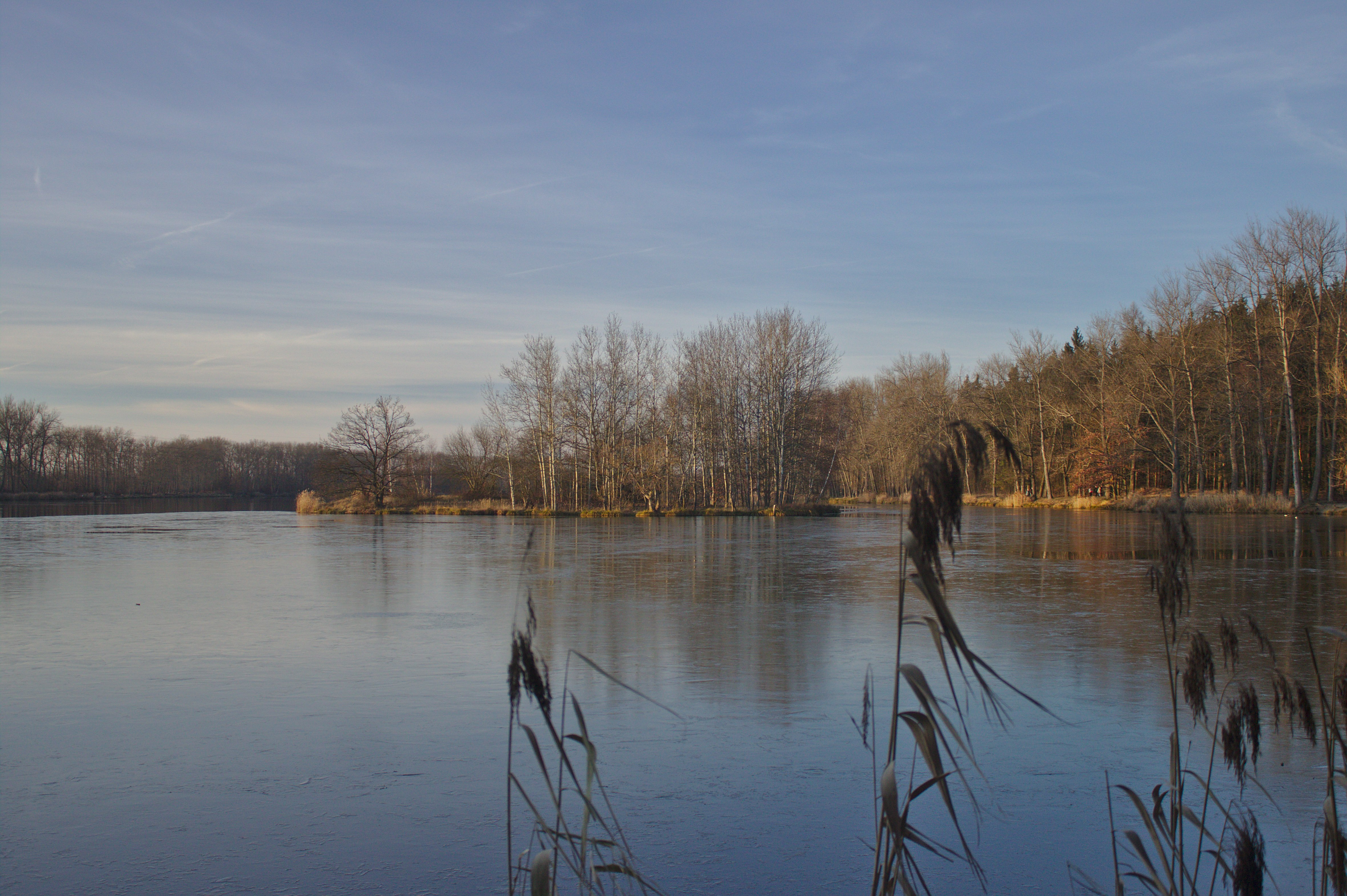
An island in the pond

The name Turyňský rybník ('Turyň's pond') is derived from a pagan God named Tur. When the pond was restored after the flooding of meadows in the locality, the locals also began to call it Záplavy (literally 'floods').

== Location ==
The pond is located in the Central Bohemian Region, about 24 kilometres (15 mi) west of Prague. It lies mostly in the territory of Kamenné Žehrovice, only a small part in the north extends into the territory of Tuchlovice. The pond is situated in the Křivoklát Highlands, at an altitude of 377 m (1,237 ft).

== Characteristics ==
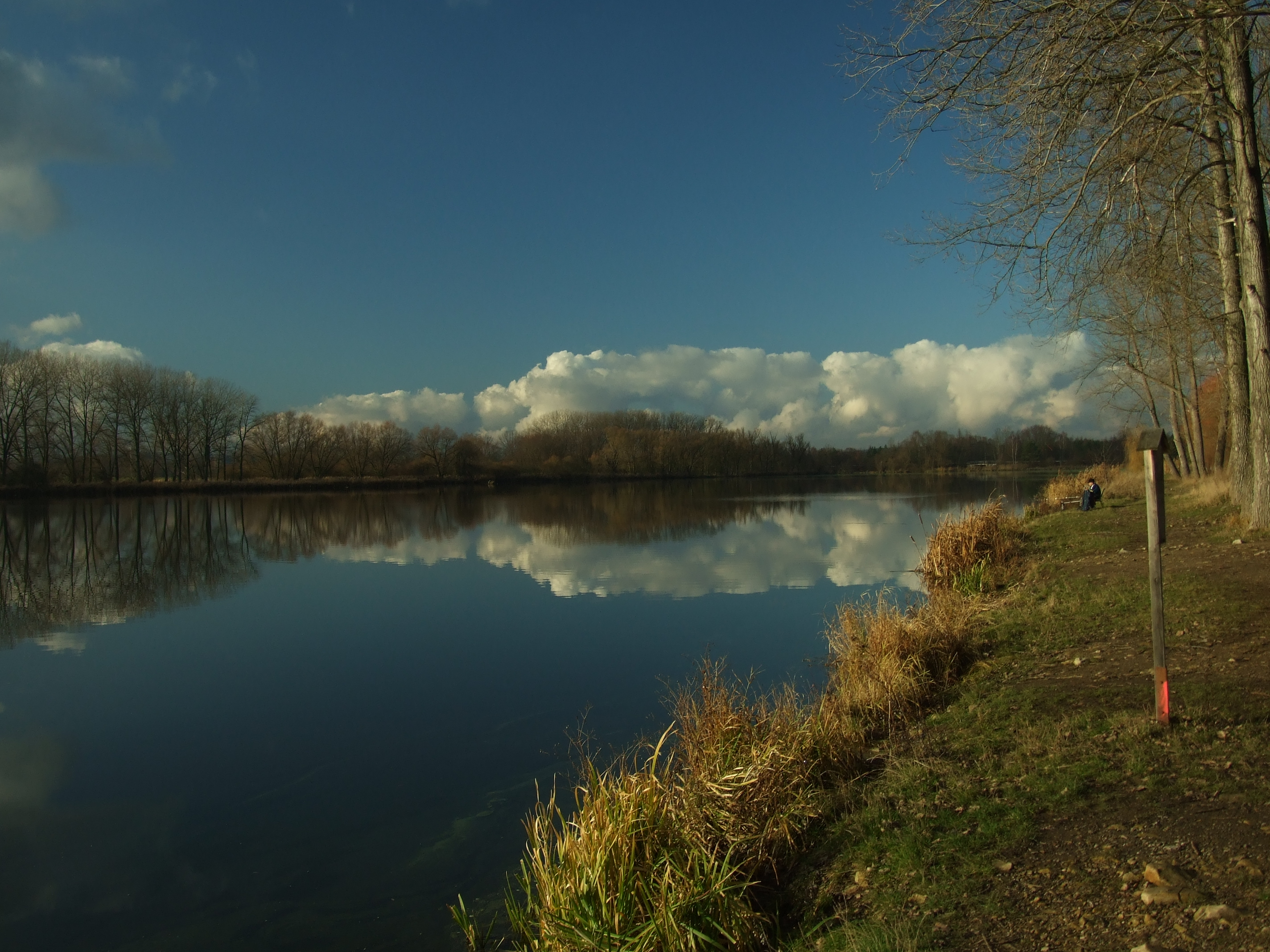
View from the east

The pond is of medieval origin. It was abolished in the middle of the 19th century, but after the flood in 1949, it was spontaneously restored. The current area of the Turyňský rybník is 51 ha (130 acres). However, its area is expanding as a result of subsidence of the terrain, a result of mining in the region in the early 20th century. At the deepest point, the depth of Turyňský rybník is 3 metres (10 ft). The primary inflow and outflow is the Loděnice River.

Turyňský rybník is 1.95 km (1.21 mi) in length, and 0.45 km (0.28 mi) wide at its widest point.

== Use ==
The subsidence of the bottom has made the pond impossible to drain, therefore it is used only for sport fishing instead of fish farming. Swimming is prohibited here.

== Nature ==
The northwestern part of Turyňský rybník is protected within the Záplavy Nature Reserve. The reserve has an area of 23.7 ha (59 acres) and in addition to part of the pond, it also includes the wetlands around the Loděnice River at the mouth of the pond. The location is an important breeding ground and migration stop for water birds and wetland birds. Among the protected species of birds that nest here are the common kingfisher, the little egret and the Eurasian hoopoe. Most of the fish typical for the Czech Republic live here (Eurasian carp, tench, common bream, catfish and others).
