= Žinkovy =

- Market town
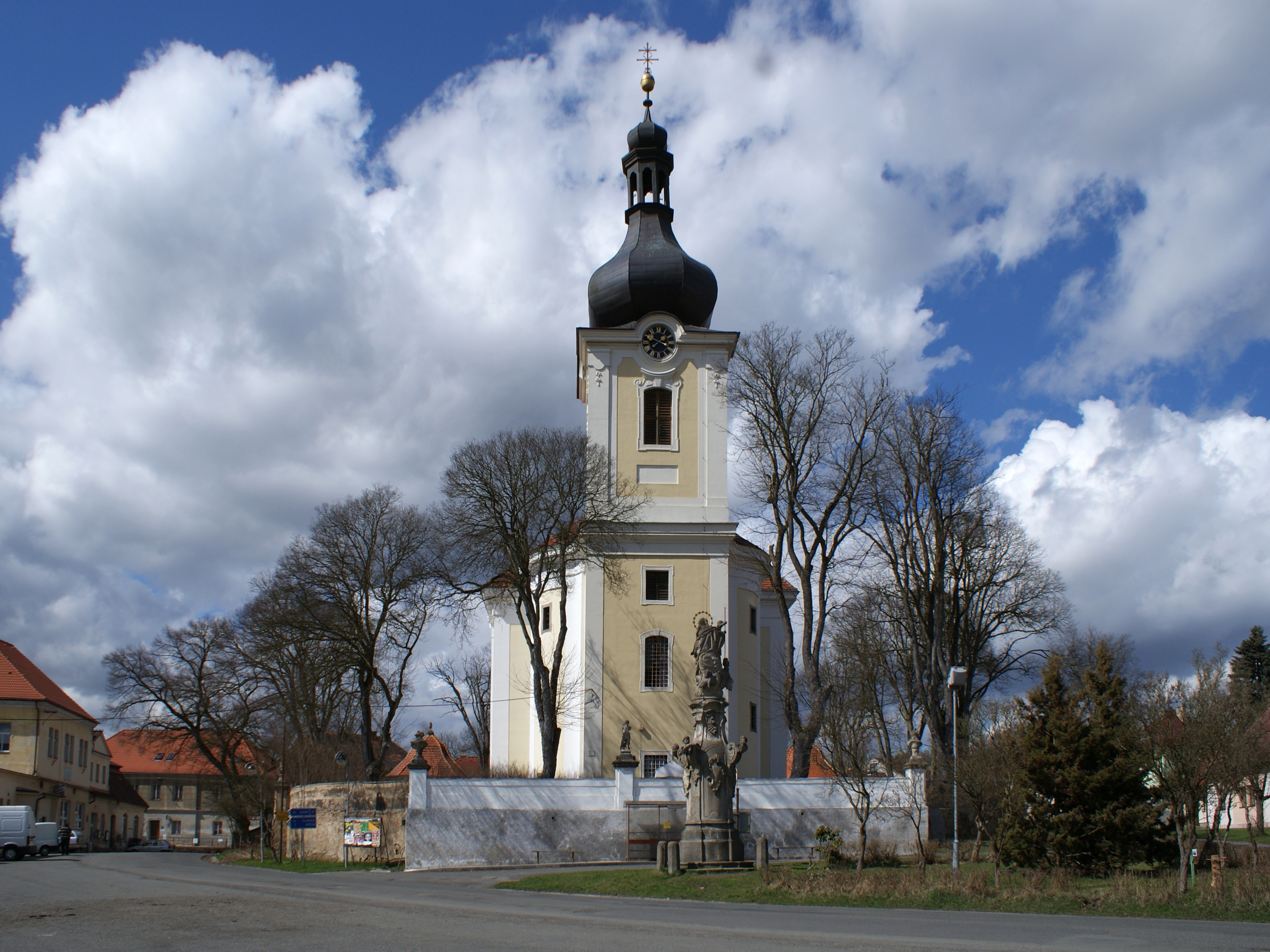
- Church of Saint Wenceslaus

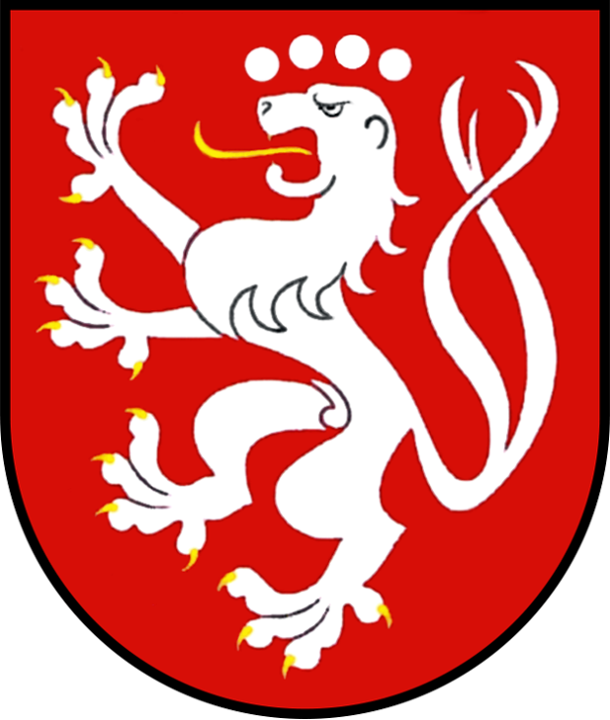
- Flag Coat of arms

- Location in the Czech Republic
- Coordinates: 49°29′4″N 13°29′32″E
- Country: Czech Republic
- Region: Plzeň
- District: Plzeň-South
- First mentioned: 1176

Area
  - Total: 20.46 km^{2} (7.90 sq mi)
- Elevation: 464 m (1,522 ft)

Population (2026-01-01)
  - Total: 857
  - Density: 41.9/km^{2} (108/sq mi)
- Time zone: UTC+1 (CET)
  - Summer (DST): UTC+2 (CEST)
- Postal codes: 335 01, 335 54
- Website: www.zinkovy.cz

Žinkovy (Czech pronunciation: [ˈʒɪnkovɪ]; German: Schinkau, Zinkau) is a market town in Plzeň-South District in the Plzeň Region of the Czech Republic. It has about 900 inhabitants.

== Administrative division ==
Žinkovy consists of four municipal parts (in brackets population according to the 2021 census):

- Žinkovy (581)
- Březí (147)
- Čepinec (42)
- Kokořov (91)

== Etymology ==
The oldest form of the name of Žinkovy was Žizenkovy. The name was derived from the personal name Žizenka, meaning "Žizenka's (court)".

== Geography ==
Žinkovy is located about 29 kilometres (18 mi) south of Plzeň. It lies on the border between the Švihov Highlands and Blatná Uplands. The highest point is the hill Buč at 617 m (2,024 ft) above sea level. The Úslava River flows through the town. The territory of Žinkovy is rich in fishponds; south of the market town proper are two notable ponds, Labuť and Žinkovský rybník.

== History ==
The first written mention of Žinkovy is from 1176, when it was owned by Oldřich of Žinkovy. His descendant built the Potštejn Castle near Žinkovy in 1252–1259 and became known as the Lords of Potštejn. The estates of Potštejn and Žinkovy were merged and Žinkovy was promoted to a market town in the second half of the 13th century. The Lords of Potštejn owned the area until the 15th century, and then the castle became a ruin.

At the beginning of the 16th century, when the site of the old castle was already overgrown with forest, the market town experienced its greatest period of development. Labuť pond was established. Revenues from brewing, cattle breeding, and the cultivation and sale of cereals increased. A Renaissance fortress was built in 1559. Development was slowed down by large fires in 1684 and 1743 and Žinkovy had to be rebuilt.

== Demographics ==
Historical population

Year	Pop.	±%
1869	1,573	—
1880	1,677	+6.6%
1890	1,546	−7.8%
1900	1,609	+4.1%
1910	1,498	−6.9%

Year	Pop.	±%
1921	1,517	+1.3%
1930	1,368	−9.8%
1950	1,224	−10.5%
1961	1,213	−0.9%
1970	1,055	−13.0%

Year	Pop.	±%
1980	1,031	−2.3%
1991	1,042	+1.1%
2001	931	−10.7%
2011	896	−3.8%
2021	861	−3.9%

Source: Censuses

== Transport ==
There are no railways or major roads passing through the municipality.

== Sights ==
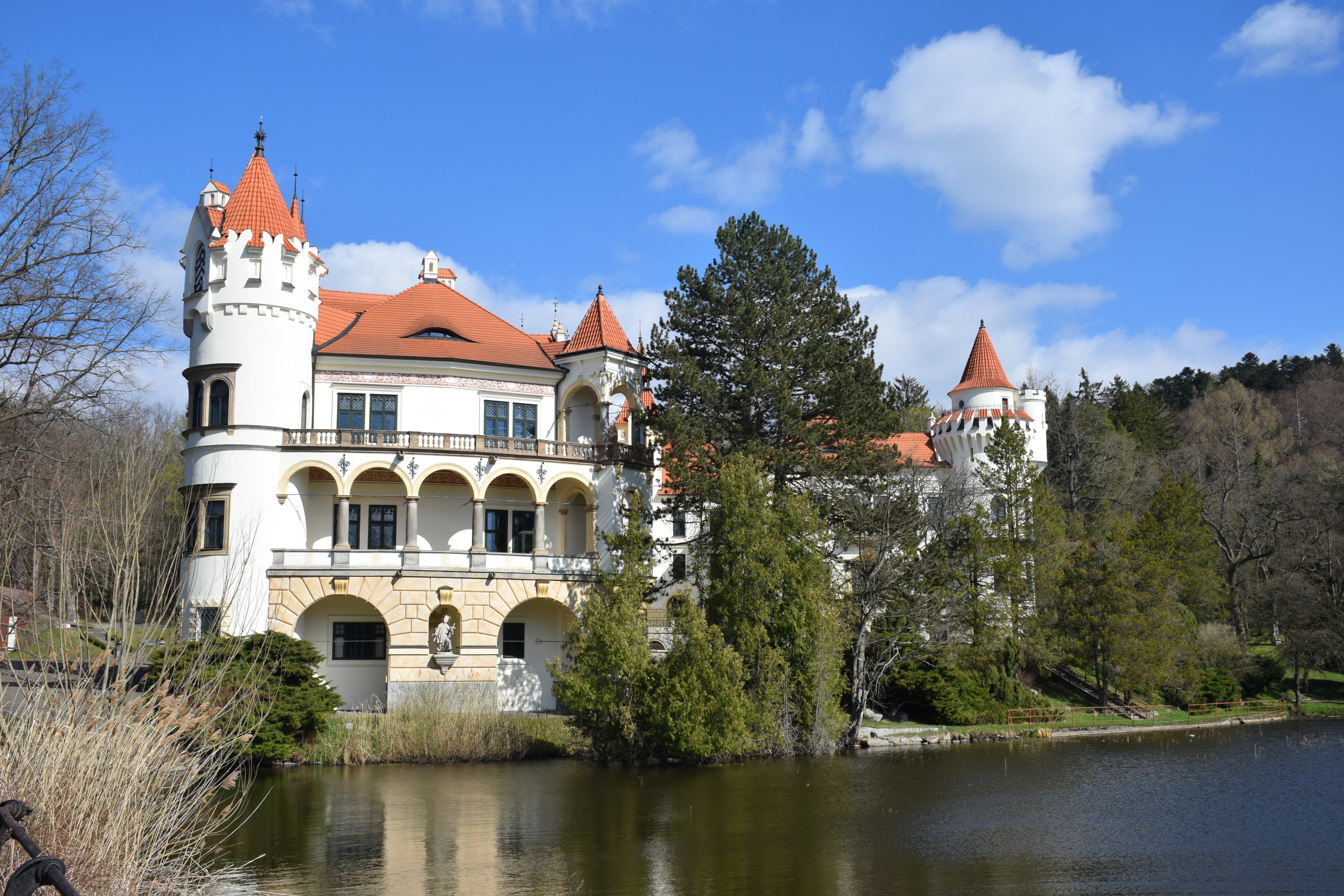
Žinkovy Castle

Among the main landmarks of Žinkovy is the Church of Saint Wenceslaus. The oldest church in Žinkovy was first documented in 1352. After the fire in 1734, it was demolished and the current Baroque church was built on its site in 1735.

The Žinkovy Castle was built between 1624 and 1642 on the site of the Renaissance fortress. The castle was gradually extended into a three-wing Baroque building with Neoclassical modifications. After 1897, the castle was completely rebuilt in the Romantic style and surrounded by an English park. From 1999, it is privately owned and unused.

== Notable people ==
- Johann Baptist Bohadsch (1724–1768), German botanist and pharmacist

== Twin towns – sister cities ==
Žinkovy is twinned with:

- Großheringen, Germany
