= Zdemyslice =

- Municipality
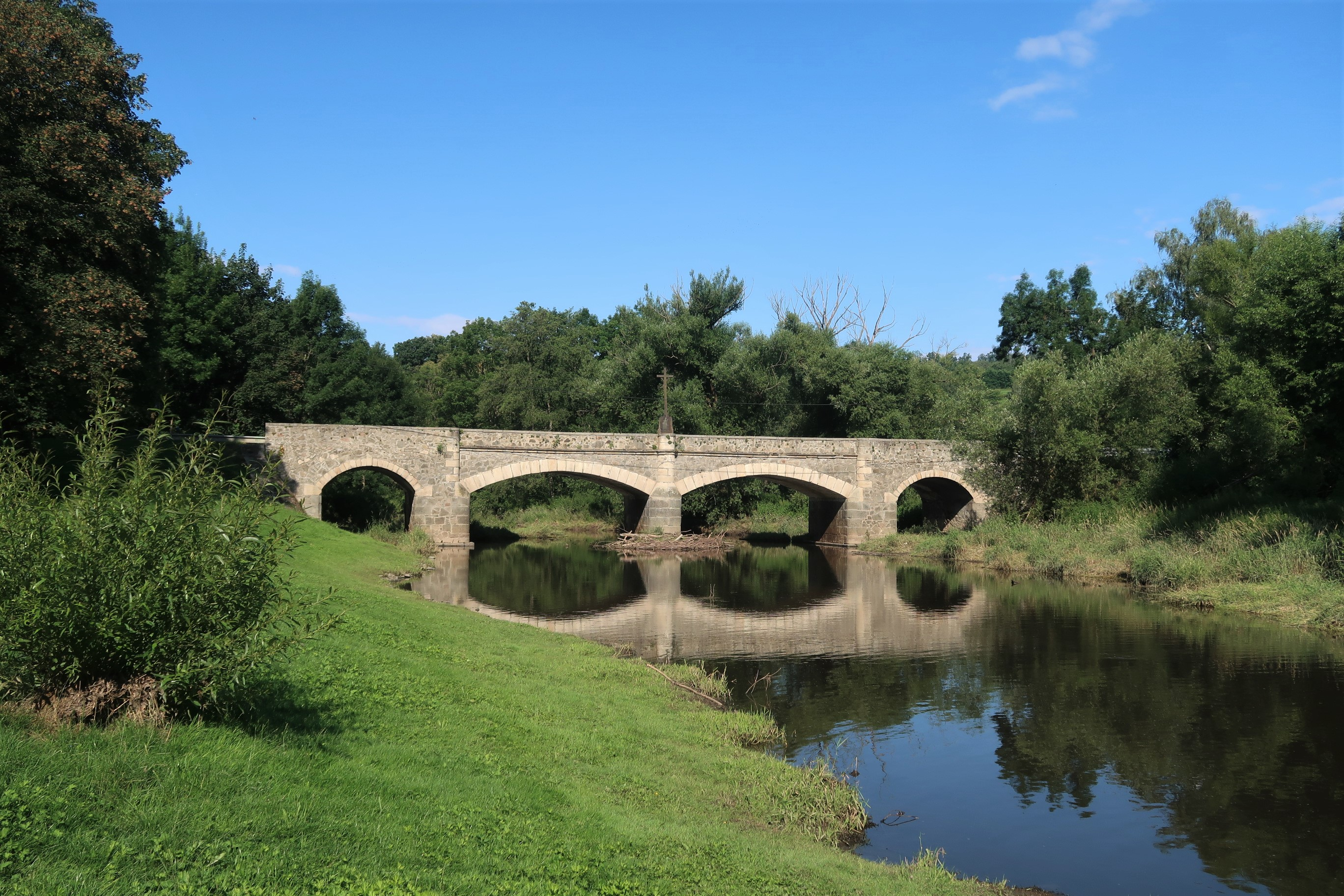
- Stone bridge over the Úslava

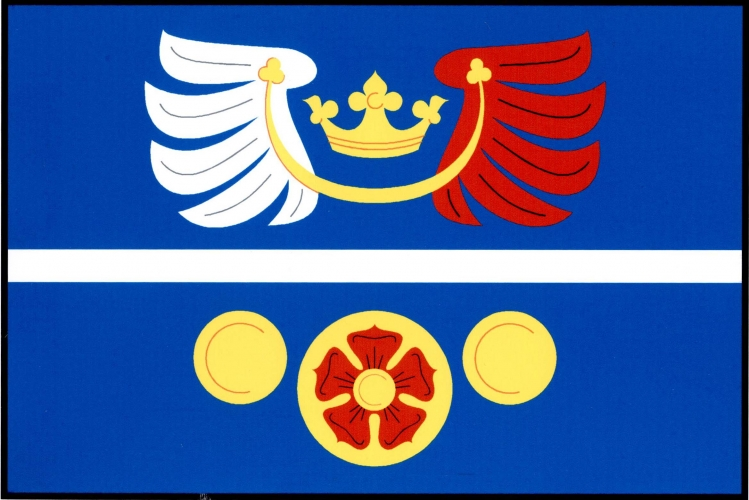
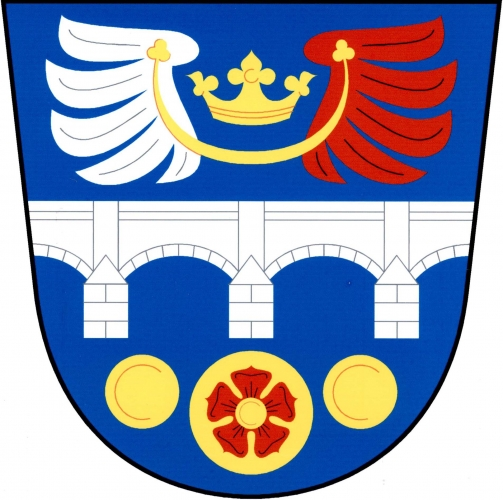
- Flag Coat of arms

- Location in the Czech Republic
- Coordinates: 49°36′25″N 13°31′11″E
- Country: Czech Republic
- Region: Plzeň
- District: Plzeň-South
- First mentioned: 1115

Area
  - Total: 4.76 km^{2} (1.84 sq mi)
- Elevation: 387 m (1,270 ft)

Population (2026-01-01)
  - Total: 682
  - Density: 143/km^{2} (371/sq mi)
- Time zone: UTC+1 (CET)
  - Summer (DST): UTC+2 (CEST)
- Postal code: 336 01
- Website: www.zdemyslice.com

Zdemyslice is a municipality and village in Plzeň-South District in the Plzeň Region of the Czech Republic. It has about 700 inhabitants.

Zdemyslice lies approximately 19 kilometres (12 mi) south-east of Plzeň and 85 km (53 mi) south-west of Prague.

== Demographics ==
Historical population
Year	Pop.	±%
1869	429	—
1880	452	+5.4%
1890	414	−8.4%
1900	393	−5.1%
1910	443	+12.7%
1921	468	+5.6%
1930	541	+15.6%
1950	513	−5.2%
1961	530	+3.3%
1970	506	−4.5%
1980	494	−2.4%
1991	452	−8.5%
2001	497	+10.0%
2011	522	+5.0%
2021	638	+22.2%
Source: Censuses
