= Johann Baptist Bohadsch =

German naturalist (1724–1768)

Johann Baptist Bohadsch (Czech: Jan Křtitel Boháč; 14 June 1724 – 16 October 1768) was a German professor of botany and pharmacology and a naturalist.

== Biography ==
Johann was born in 1724 in Schinkau, Bohemia (now Žinkovy, Czech Republic). His father was manager of the estates of Count Wenzel von Zwrtby. Johann was educated at a Jesuit seminary where he learned Latin and philosophy. He then studied medicine at the "Carolina Medicin".

Between 1746 and 1750, he made trips to Padua, Montpellier, Paris and several German universities and after his return published a dissertation on the uses of electricity in medicine. In 1753, he was made associate professor of natural philosophy in Prague and began to collect materials for a work on the natural history of Bohemia. Interrupted by the war and riots, he travelled to Italy from 1757 to 1759, where he collected and described a number of new species of marine invertebrates. On his return he was appointed professor of botany and pharmacology and in 1762 elected a fellow of the Royal Society. On a natural history trip to Bohemia he contracted a severe chill. He died on 16 October 1768 in Prague.

== Writings ==
His zoological writings include De veris Sepiarum ovis (Pragae 1752) and De quibusdam animalibus marinis (Dresdae 1761) the latter being translated from the Latin by Leske in 1776. He also published a booklet on the medical benefits of Acacia and of woad (Isatis tinctoria). Another booklet describing the natural history of Gmunden has remained in manuscript form.
