= Neurazy =

- Municipality
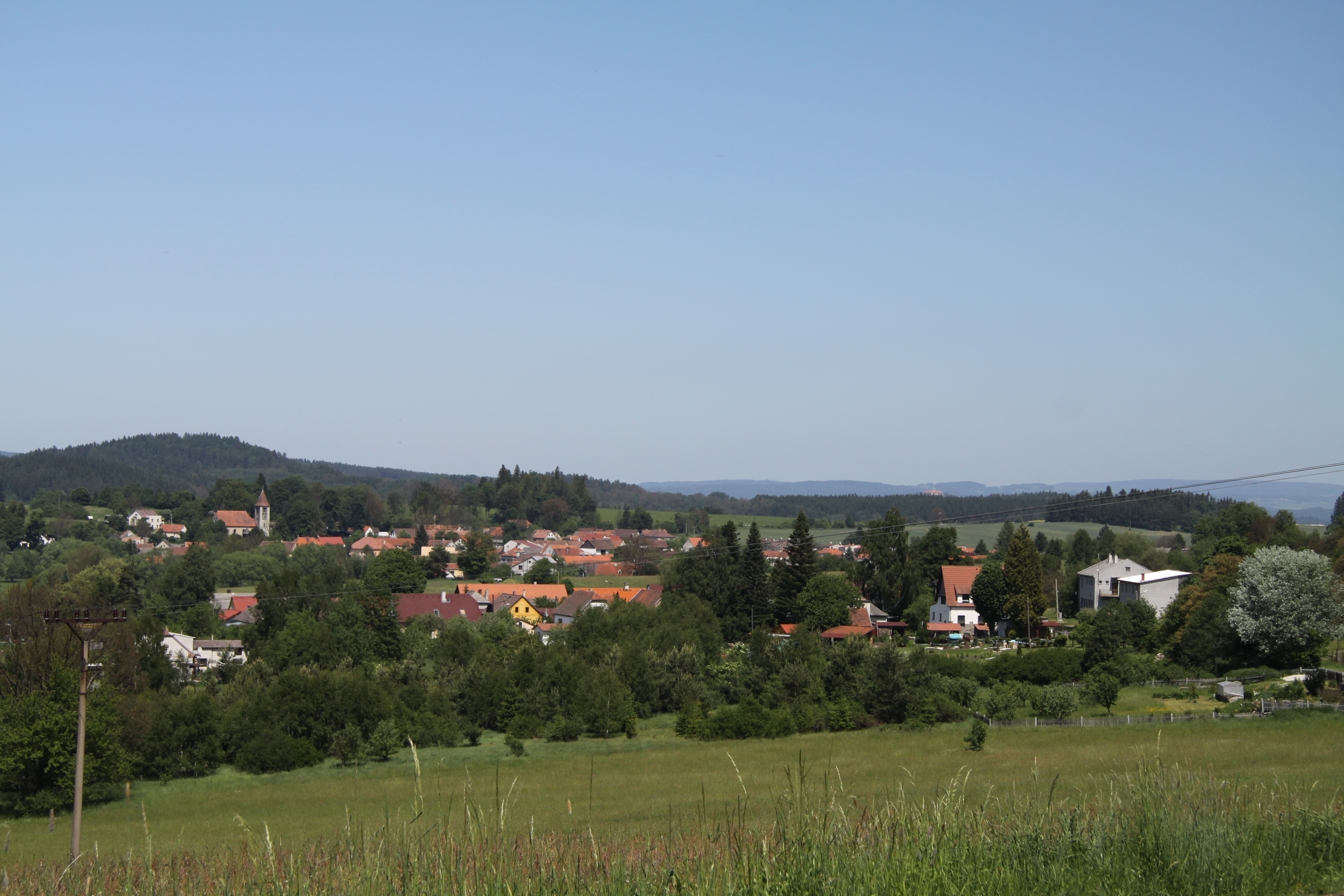
- General view

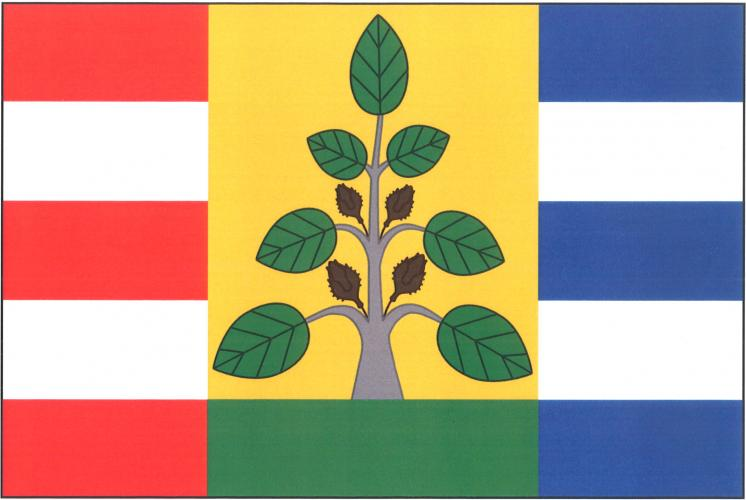
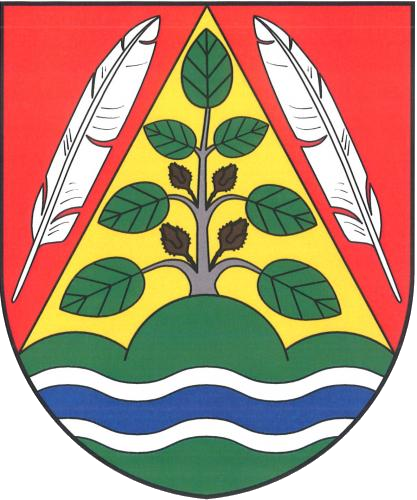
- Flag Coat of arms

- Location in the Czech Republic
- Coordinates: 49°26′28″N 13°30′56″E
- Country: Czech Republic
- Region: Plzeň
- District: Plzeň-South
- First mentioned: 1551

Area
  - Total: 25.85 km^{2} (9.98 sq mi)
- Elevation: 488 m (1,601 ft)

Population (2026-01-01)
  - Total: 702
  - Density: 27.2/km^{2} (70.3/sq mi)
- Time zone: UTC+1 (CET)
  - Summer (DST): UTC+2 (CEST)
- Postal code: 335 55
- Website: neurazy.cz

Neurazy is a municipality and village in Plzeň-South District in the Plzeň Region of the Czech Republic. It has about 700 inhabitants.

Neurazy lies approximately 36 kilometres (22 mi) south of Plzeň and 98 km (61 mi) south-west of Prague.

== Administrative division ==
Neurazy consists of seven municipal parts (in brackets population according to the 2021 census):

- Neurazy (238)
- Klikařov (92)
- Nová Ves u Nepomuka (72)
- Partoltice (62)
- Radochovy (76)
- Soběsuky (100)
- Vojovice (75)

== Demographics ==
Historical population
Year	Pop.	±%
1869	2,121	—
1880	2,147	+1.2%
1890	2,199	+2.4%
1900	2,221	+1.0%
1910	2,462	+10.9%
1921	2,300	−6.6%
1930	2,080	−9.6%
1950	1,688	−18.8%
1961	1,596	−5.5%
1970	1,331	−16.6%
1980	1,117	−16.1%
1991	922	−17.5%
2001	826	−10.4%
2011	837	+1.3%
2021	715	−14.6%
Source: Censuses
