= Tuchlovice =

- Municipality
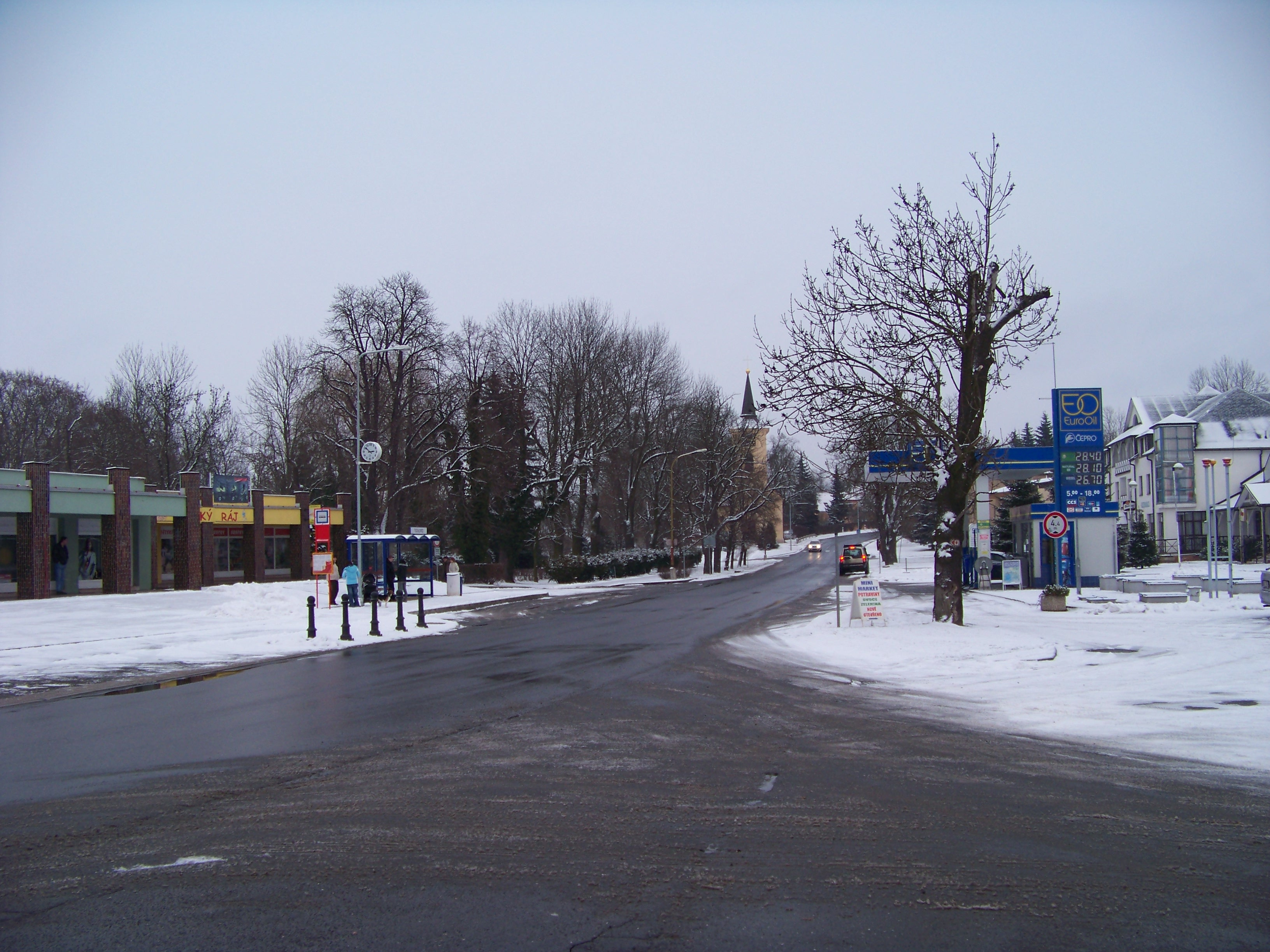
- Centre of Tuchlovice

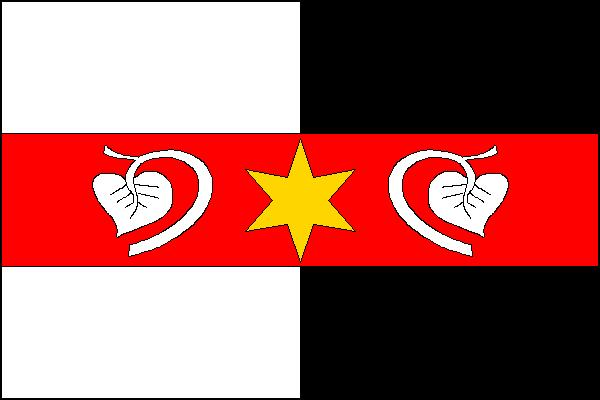
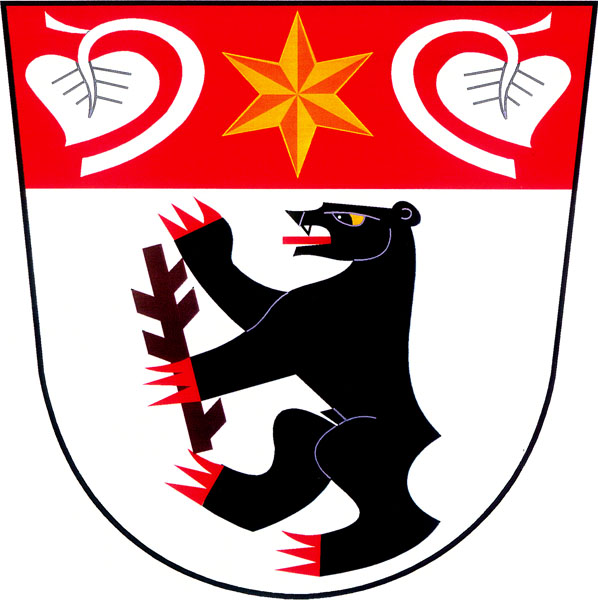
- Flag Coat of arms

- Location in the Czech Republic
- Coordinates: 50°8′17″N 13°59′28″E
- Country: Czech Republic
- Region: Central Bohemian
- District: Kladno
- First mentioned: 1283

Area
  - Total: 12.75 km^{2} (4.92 sq mi)
- Elevation: 398 m (1,306 ft)

Population (2026-01-01)
  - Total: 2,785
  - Density: 218.4/km^{2} (565.7/sq mi)
- Time zone: UTC+1 (CET)
  - Summer (DST): UTC+2 (CEST)
- Postal code: 273 02
- Website: ou-tuchlovice.cz

Tuchlovice is a municipality and village in Kladno District in the Central Bohemian Region of the Czech Republic. It has about 2,800 inhabitants.

== Administrative division ==
Tuchlovice consists of two municipal parts (in brackets population according to the 2021 census):

- Tuchlovice (2,236)
- Srby (410)

== Etymology ==
The initial name of the village was Tuchovice. The name was derived from the personal name Tuch, meaning "the village of Tuch's people". In the 14th century, the name was distorted to its present form.

== Geography ==
Tuchlovice is located about 8 kilometres (5 mi) west of Kladno and 26 km (16 mi) west of Prague. The municipal territory lies mostly in the Křivoklát Highlands, but it also extends into the Džbán range in the west and to the Prague Plateau in the east. The highest point is the artificial hill Tuchlovická halda at 484 m (1,588 ft) above sea level. The Loděnice River flows through the municipality. A small part of the fishpond Turyňský rybník, supplied by the Loděnice, extends into the eastern part of the municipal territory.

== History ==
The first written mention of Tuchlovice is from 1283. From 1613 until the establishment of an independent municipality in 1850, the village was owned by the Martinic family.

== Demographics ==
Historical population

Year	Pop.	±%
1869	1,253	—
1880	1,453	+16.0%
1890	1,488	+2.4%
1900	2,175	+46.2%
1910	2,718	+25.0%

Year	Pop.	±%
1921	2,793	+2.8%
1930	2,919	+4.5%
1950	2,713	−7.1%
1961	2,792	+2.9%
1970	2,574	−7.8%

Year	Pop.	±%
1980	2,117	−17.8%
1991	1,960	−7.4%
2001	2,145	+9.4%
2011	2,394	+11.6%
2021	2,746	+14.7%

Source: Censuses

== Transport ==
The D6 motorway from Prague to Karlovy Vary runs through the municipality.

== Sights ==
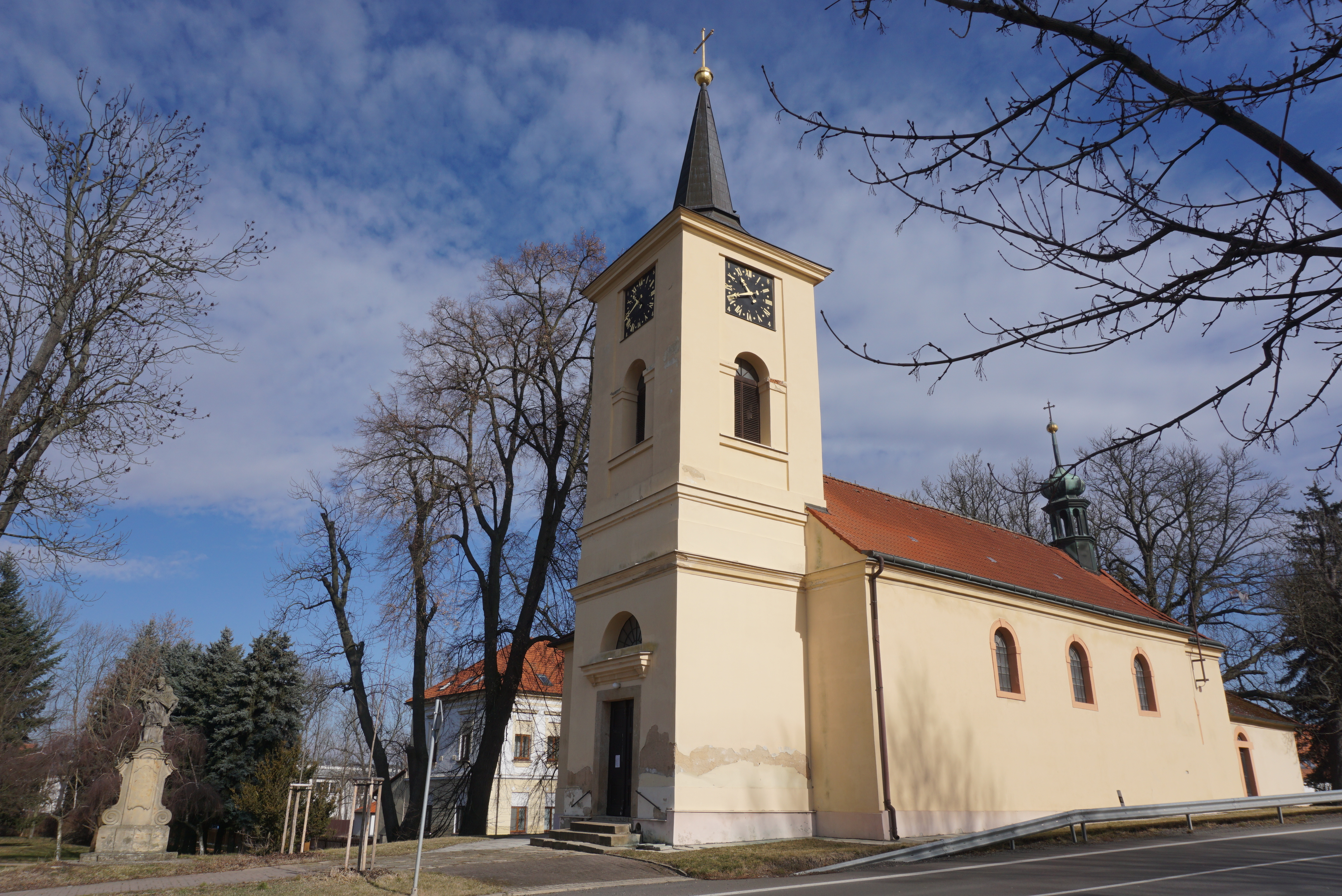
Church of Saint Gall

The main landmark of Tuchlovice is the Church of Saint Gall. The originally Gothic church was first documented in 1330. After a fire, the church was rebuilt in 1844 and the tower was added.

== In popular culture ==
The 2016 movie The Good Plumber (Czech: Instalatér z Tuchlovic) was filmed here and was based on a real resident of Tuchlovice. Another movie that was shot here was Forbidden Dreams (1987).
