= Ždírec (Havlíčkův Brod District) =

- Municipality
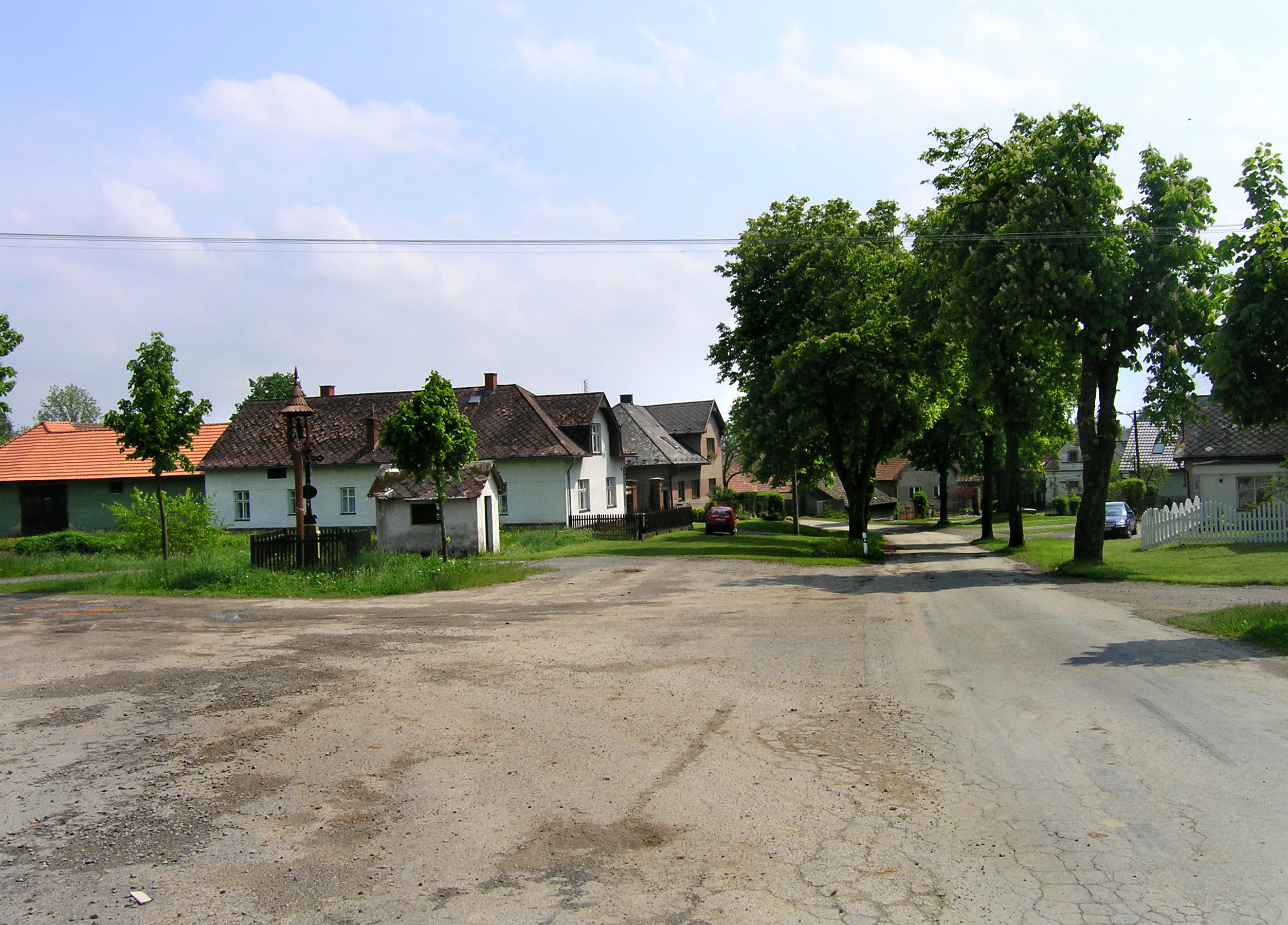
- Centre of Ždírec

- Location in the Czech Republic
- Coordinates: 49°37′45″N 15°38′31″E
- Country: Czech Republic
- Region: Vysočina
- District: Havlíčkův Brod
- First mentioned: 1350

Area
  - Total: 2.52 km^{2} (0.97 sq mi)
- Elevation: 483 m (1,585 ft)

Population (2026-01-01)
  - Total: 125
  - Density: 49.6/km^{2} (128/sq mi)
- Time zone: UTC+1 (CET)
  - Summer (DST): UTC+2 (CEST)
- Postal code: 580 01
- Website: www.zdirechb.cz

Ždírec (German: Sehrlenz) is a municipality and village in Havlíčkův Brod District in the Vysočina Region of the Czech Republic. It has about 100 inhabitants.

Ždírec lies approximately 6 kilometres (4 mi) north-east of Havlíčkův Brod, 27 km (17 mi) north of Jihlava, and 102 km (63 mi) south-east of Prague.

== Demographics ==
Historical population
Year	Pop.	±%
1869	139	—
1880	121	−12.9%
1890	137	+13.2%
1900	145	+5.8%
1910	158	+9.0%
1921	159	+0.6%
1930	142	−10.7%
1950	118	−16.9%
1961	114	−3.4%
1970	113	−0.9%
1980	132	+16.8%
1991	129	−2.3%
2001	139	+7.8%
2011	136	−2.2%
2021	145	+6.6%
Source: Censuses
