= Mlýnské Struhadlo =

- Municipality
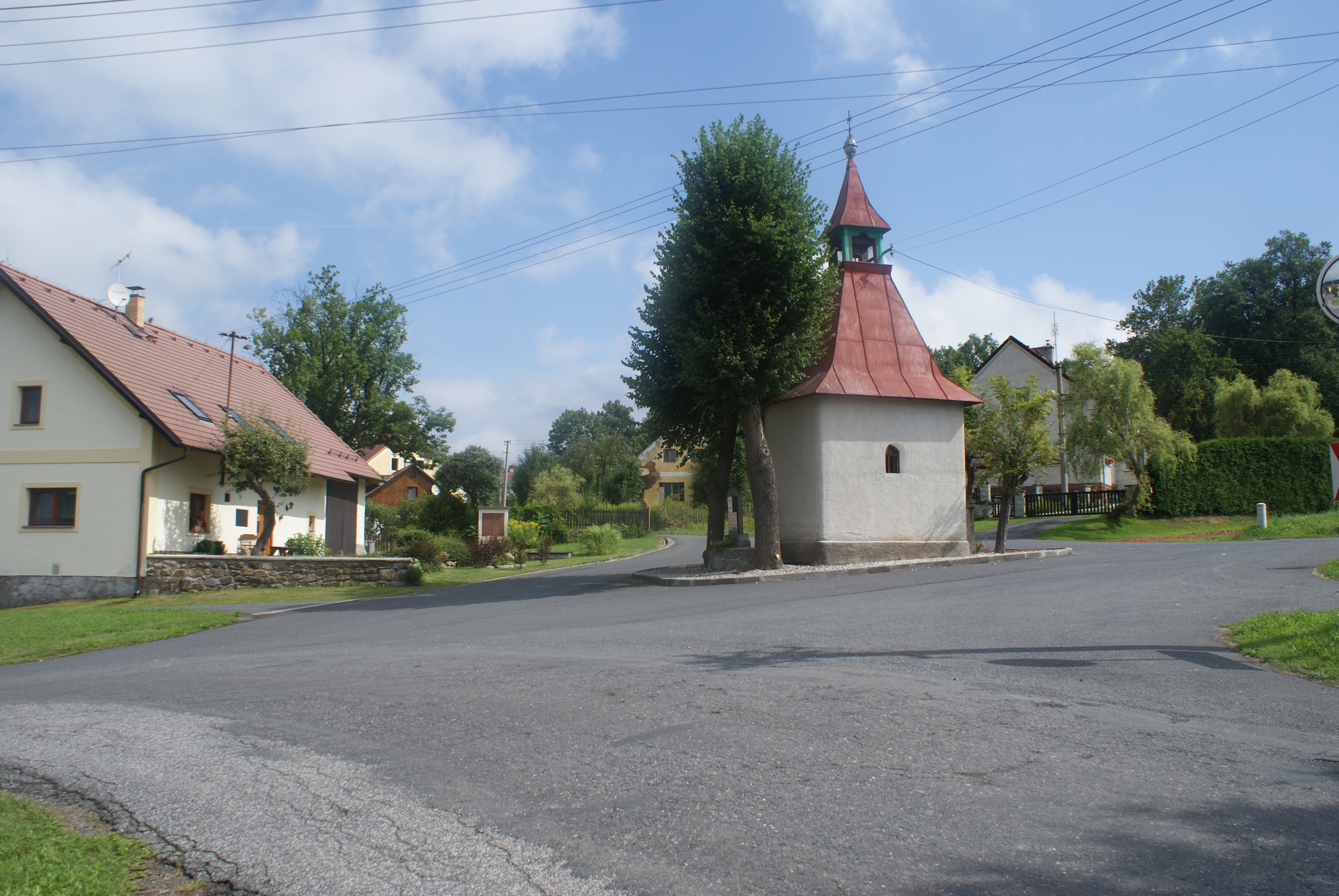
- Chapel in the centre of Mlýnské Struhadlo

- Location in the Czech Republic
- Coordinates: 49°25′54″N 13°28′12″E
- Country: Czech Republic
- Region: Plzeň
- District: Klatovy
- First mentioned: 1437

Area
  - Total: 4.04 km^{2} (1.56 sq mi)
- Elevation: 498 m (1,634 ft)

Population (2026-01-01)
  - Total: 56
  - Density: 14/km^{2} (36/sq mi)
- Time zone: UTC+1 (CET)
  - Summer (DST): UTC+2 (CEST)
- Postal code: 339 01
- Website: www.mlynskestruhadlo.cz

Mlýnské Struhadlo is a municipality and village in Klatovy District in the Plzeň Region of the Czech Republic. It has about 60 inhabitants.

Mlýnské Struhadlo lies approximately 15 kilometres (9 mi) east of Klatovy, 36 km (22 mi) south of Plzeň, and 100 km (62 mi) south-west of Prague.

== Demographics ==
Historical population
Year	Pop.	±%
1869	228	—
1880	245	+7.5%
1890	253	+3.3%
1900	242	−4.3%
1910	284	+17.4%
1921	280	−1.4%
1930	261	−6.8%
1950	192	−26.4%
1961	179	−6.8%
1970	125	−30.2%
1980	95	−24.0%
1991	69	−27.4%
2001	54	−21.7%
2011	52	−3.7%
2021	56	+7.7%
Source: Censuses
