= Číhaň =

- Municipality
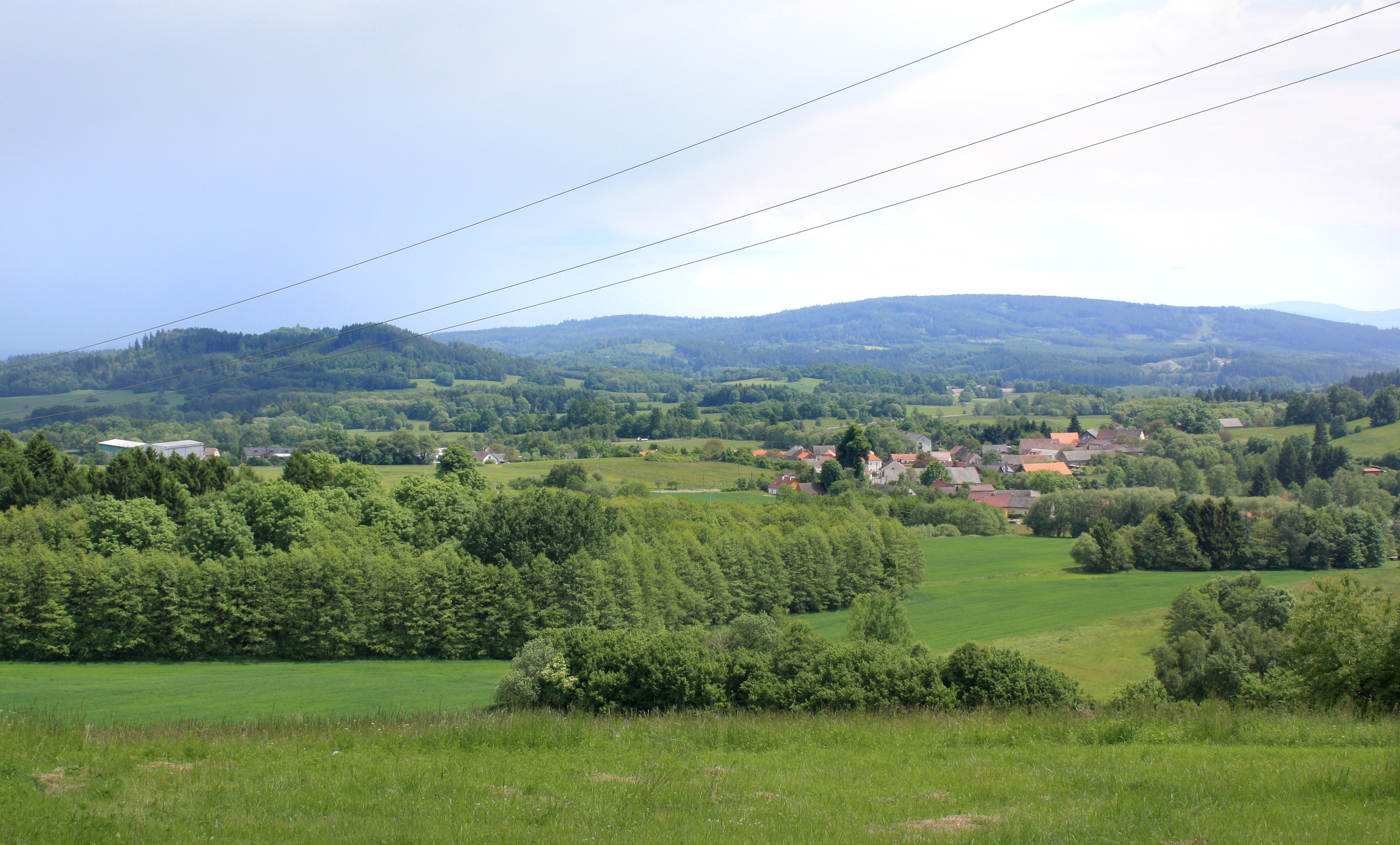
- View from the northwest

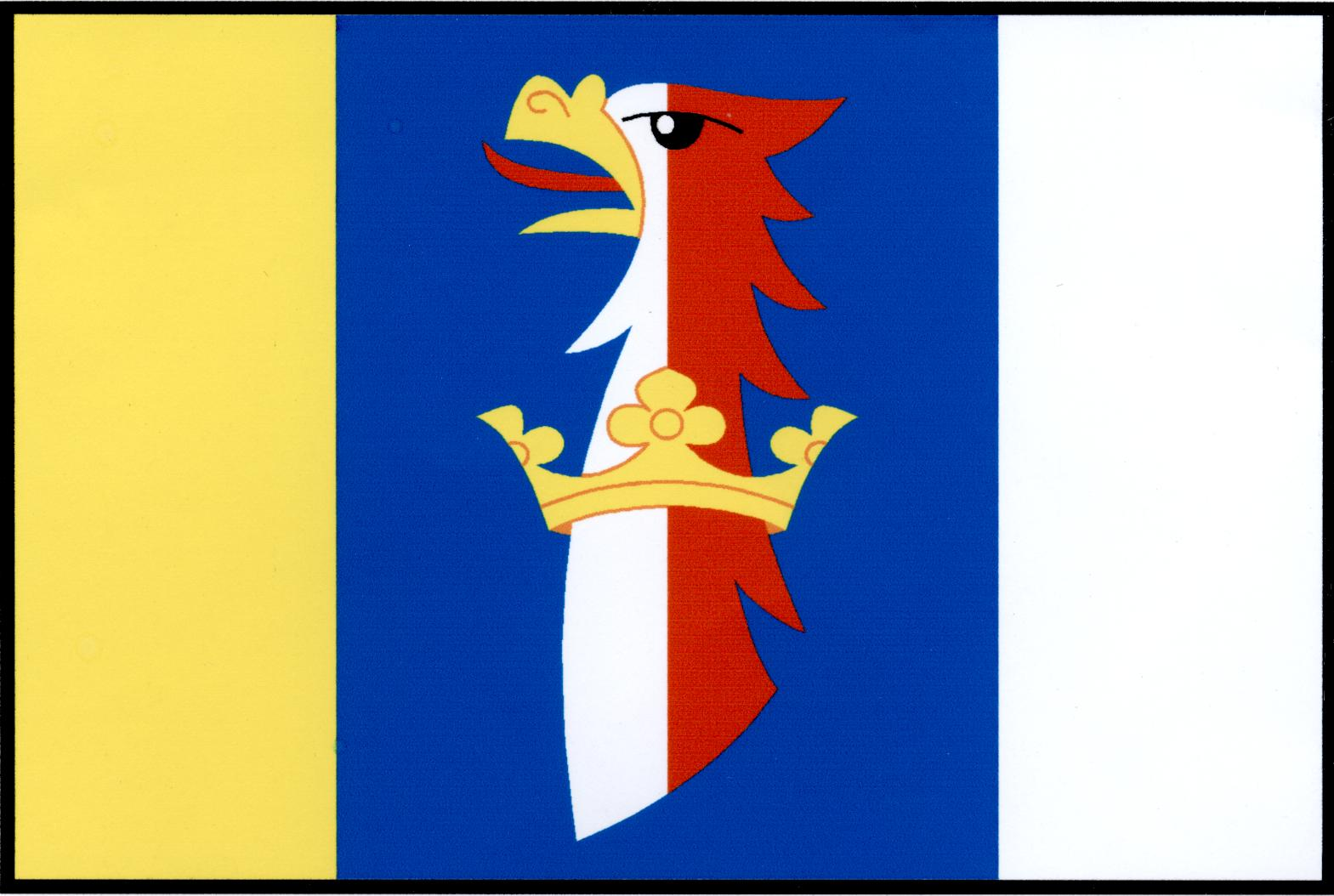
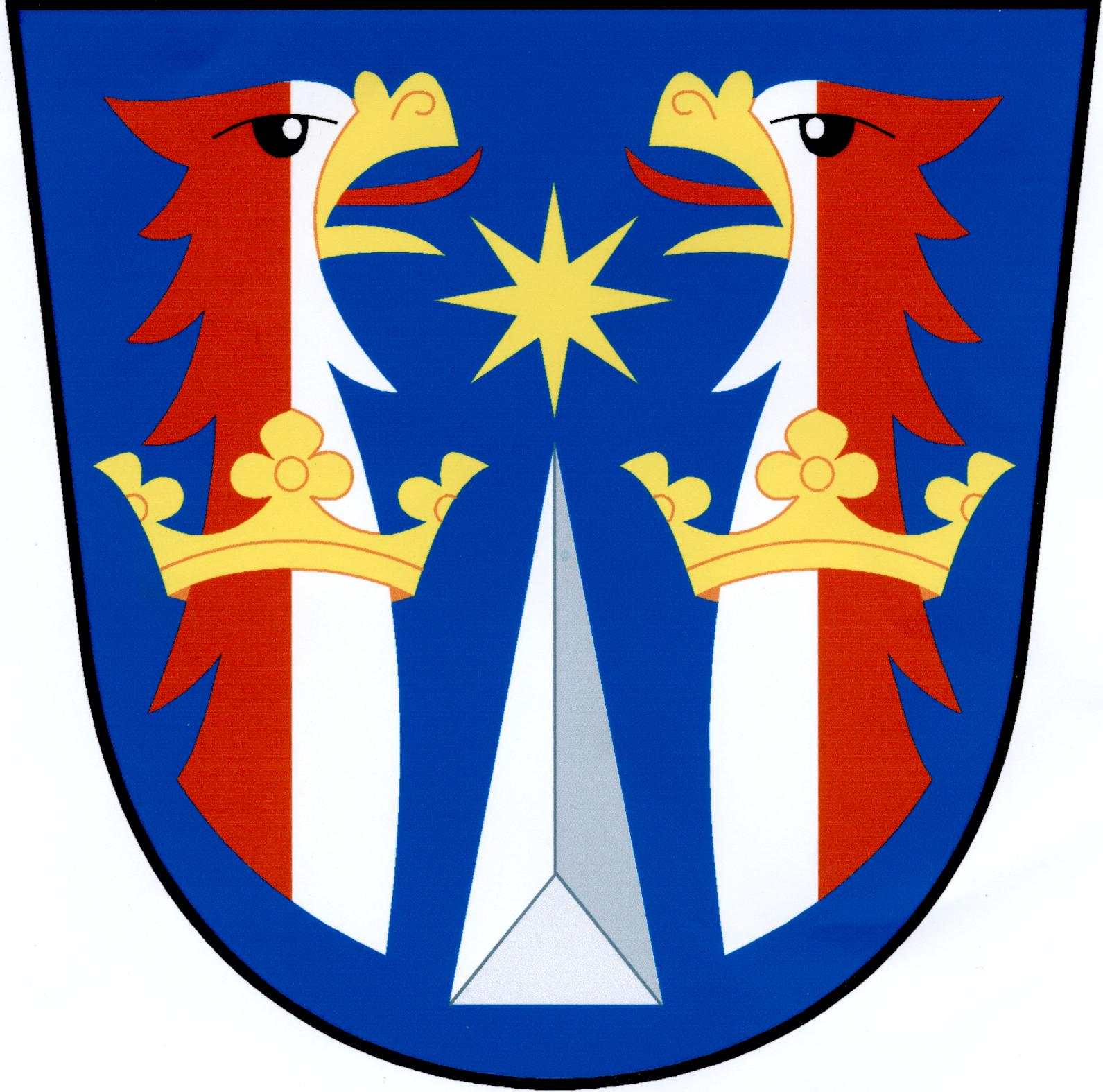
- Flag Coat of arms

- Location in the Czech Republic
- Coordinates: 49°20′33″N 13°25′33″E
- Country: Czech Republic
- Region: Plzeň
- District: Klatovy
- First mentioned: 1552

Area
  - Total: 8.52 km^{2} (3.29 sq mi)
- Elevation: 593 m (1,946 ft)

Population (2026-01-01)
  - Total: 222
  - Density: 26.1/km^{2} (67.5/sq mi)
- Time zone: UTC+1 (CET)
  - Summer (DST): UTC+2 (CEST)
- Postal code: 341 42
- Website: www.cihan.cz

Číhaň is a municipality and village in Klatovy District in the Plzeň Region of the Czech Republic. It has about 200 inhabitants.

Číhaň lies approximately 13 kilometres (8 mi) south-east of Klatovy, 46 km (29 mi) south of Plzeň, and 110 km (68 mi) south-west of Prague.

== Administrative division ==
Číhaň consists of three municipal parts (in brackets population according to the 2021 census):

- Číhaň (191)
- Nový Dvůr (10)
- Plánička (6)

== Demographics ==
Historical population
Year	Pop.	±%
1869	474	—
1880	533	+12.4%
1890	496	−6.9%
1900	533	+7.5%
1910	543	+1.9%
1921	552	+1.7%
1930	516	−6.5%
1950	351	−32.0%
1961	309	−12.0%
1970	283	−8.4%
1980	215	−24.0%
1991	189	−12.1%
2001	196	+3.7%
2011	199	+1.5%
2021	207	+4.0%
Source: Censuses
