= Srby (Plzeň-South District) =

- Municipality
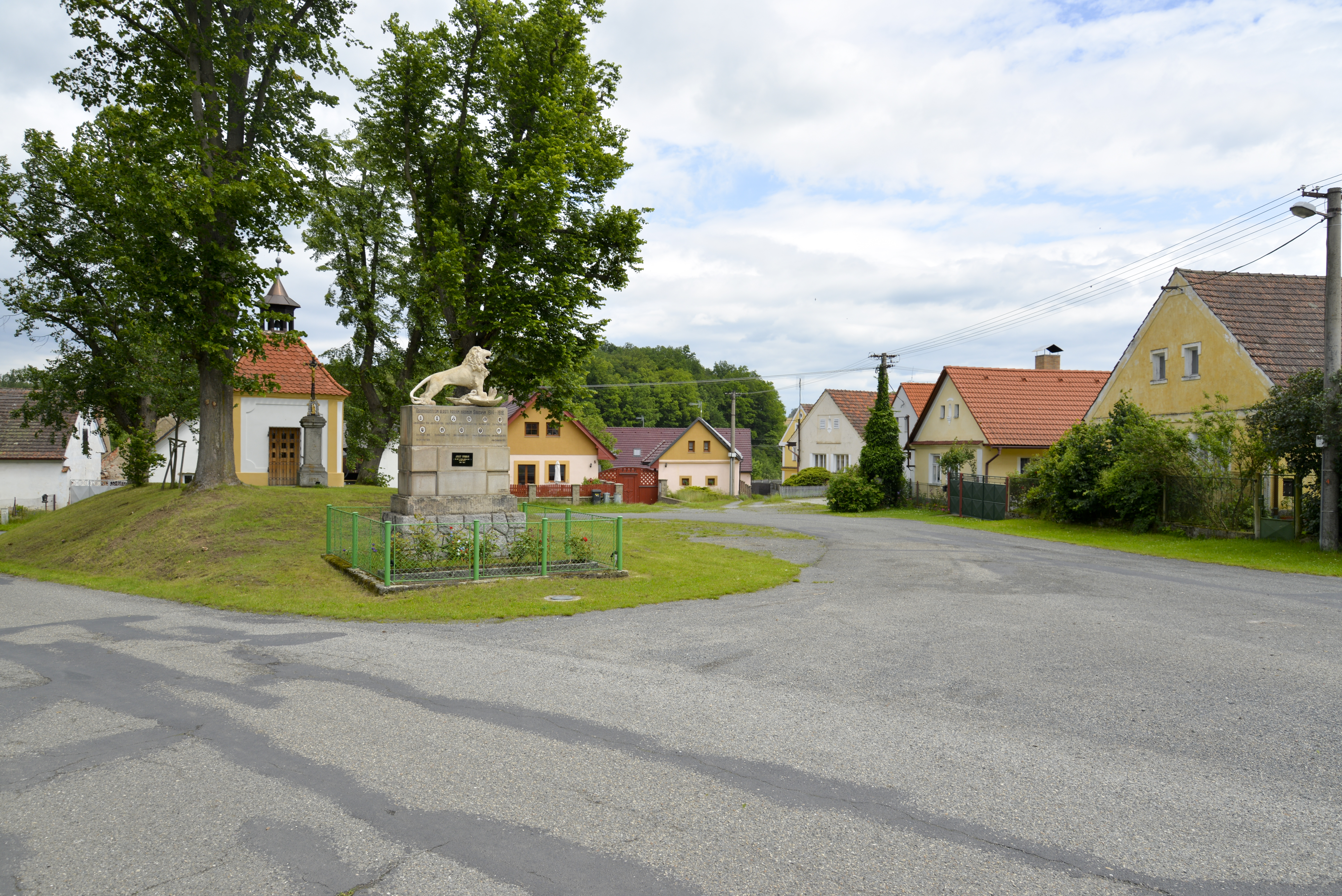
- Centre of Srby

- Location in the Czech Republic
- Coordinates: 49°31′9″N 13°36′12″E
- Country: Czech Republic
- Region: Plzeň
- District: Plzeň-South
- First mentioned: 1558

Area
  - Total: 4.52 km^{2} (1.75 sq mi)
- Elevation: 418 m (1,371 ft)

Population (2026-01-01)
  - Total: 175
  - Density: 38.7/km^{2} (100/sq mi)
- Time zone: UTC+1 (CET)
  - Summer (DST): UTC+2 (CEST)
- Postal code: 335 01
- Website: www.srby.cz

Srby (German: Sirb) is a municipality and village in Plzeň-South District in the Plzeň Region of the Czech Republic. It has about 200 inhabitants.

Srby lies approximately 30 kilometres (19 mi) south-east of Plzeň and 87 km (54 mi) south-west of Prague.

== Demographics ==
Historical population
Year	Pop.	±%
1869	326	—
1880	362	+11.0%
1890	388	+7.2%
1900	391	+0.8%
1910	378	−3.3%
1921	411	+8.7%
1930	427	+3.9%
1950	366	−14.3%
1961	344	−6.0%
1970	287	−16.6%
1980	242	−15.7%
1991	194	−19.8%
2001	165	−14.9%
2011	171	+3.6%
2021	155	−9.4%
Source: Censuses
