= Ždírec (Plzeň-South District) =

- Municipality
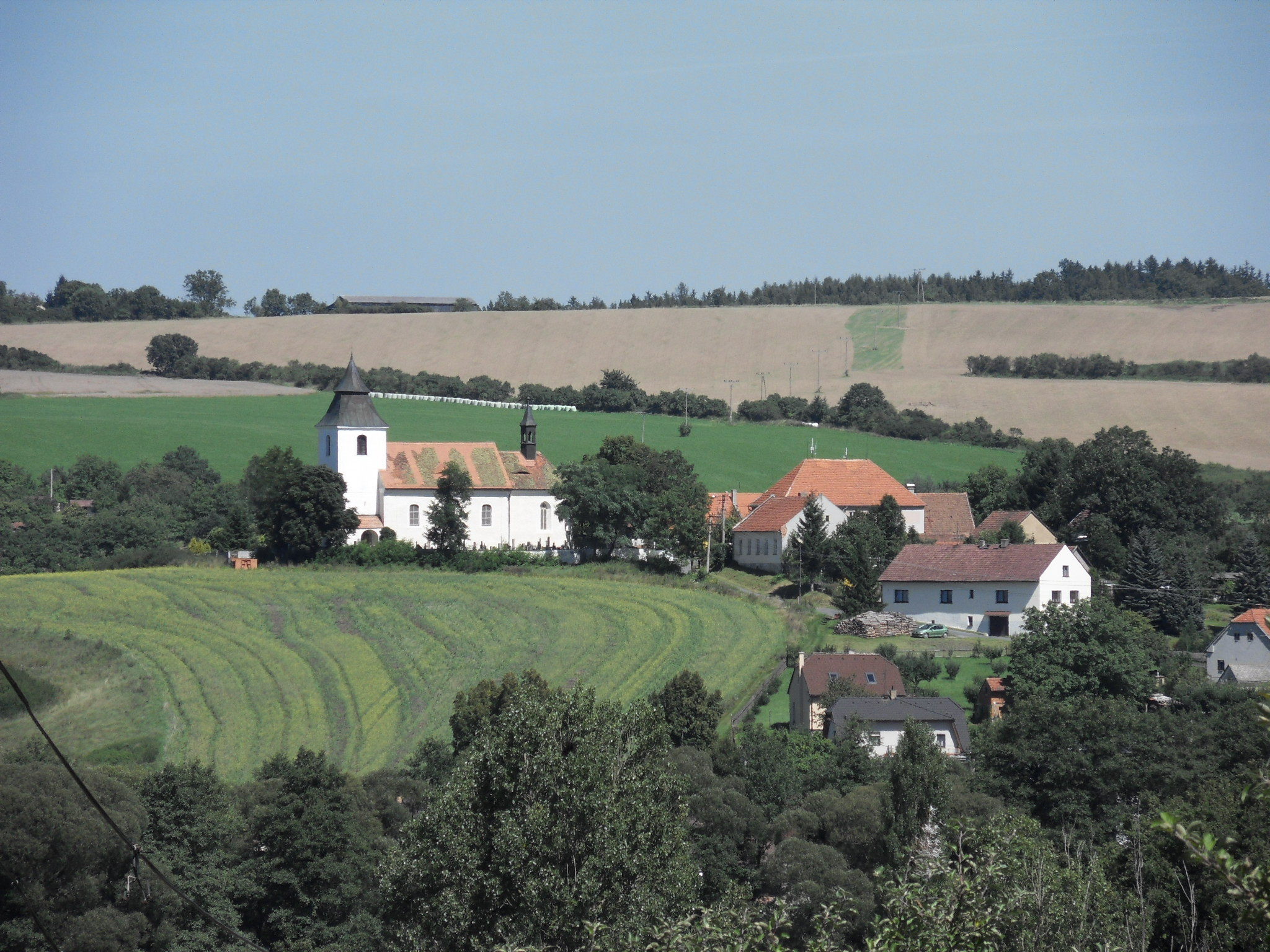
- Church of Saint Wenceslaus in Žďár

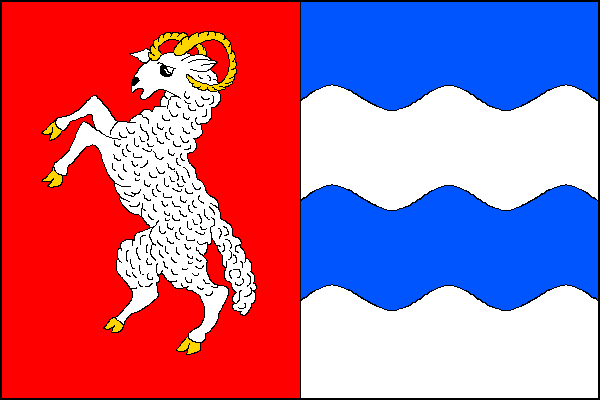
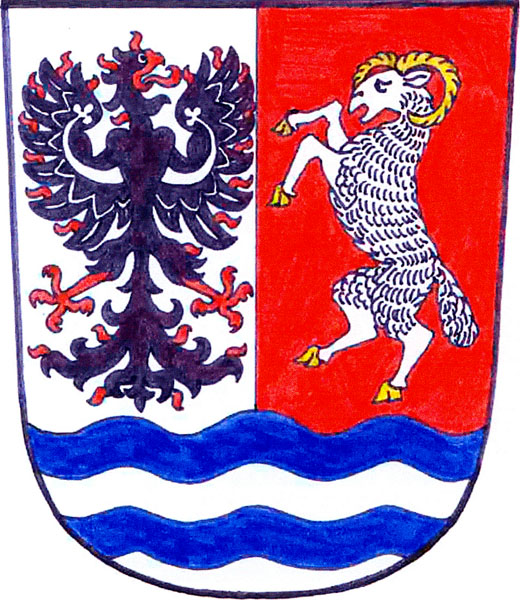
- Flag Coat of arms

- Location in the Czech Republic
- Coordinates: 49°33′7″N 13°34′20″E
- Country: Czech Republic
- Region: Plzeň
- District: Plzeň-South
- First mentioned: 1376

Area
  - Total: 9.34 km^{2} (3.61 sq mi)
- Elevation: 418 m (1,371 ft)

Population (2026-01-01)
  - Total: 498
  - Density: 53.3/km^{2} (138/sq mi)
- Time zone: UTC+1 (CET)
  - Summer (DST): UTC+2 (CEST)
- Postal code: 336 01
- Website: www.obec-zdirec.cz

Ždírec is a municipality and village in Plzeň-South District in the Plzeň Region of the Czech Republic. It has about 500 inhabitants.

Ždírec lies approximately 27 kilometres (17 mi) south-east of Plzeň and 86 km (53 mi) south-west of Prague.

== Administrative division ==
Ždírec consists of four municipal parts (in brackets population according to the 2021 census):

- Ždírec (150)
- Myť (145)
- Smederov (92)
- Žďár (64)

== Demographics ==
Historical population
| Year | Pop. | ±% |
|---|---|---|
| 1869 | 682 | — |
| 1880 | 658 | −3.5% |
| 1890 | 651 | −1.1% |
| 1900 | 589 | −9.5% |
| 1910 | 600 | +1.9% |
| 1921 | 687 | +14.5% |
| 1930 | 653 | −4.9% |
| 1950 | 589 | −9.8% |
| 1961 | 648 | +10.0% |
| 1970 | 609 | −6.0% |
| 1980 | 531 | −12.8% |
| 1991 | 435 | −18.1% |
| 2001 | 438 | +0.7% |
| 2011 | 449 | +2.5% |
| 2021 | 451 | +0.4% |
Source: Censuses
