= Úhlava =

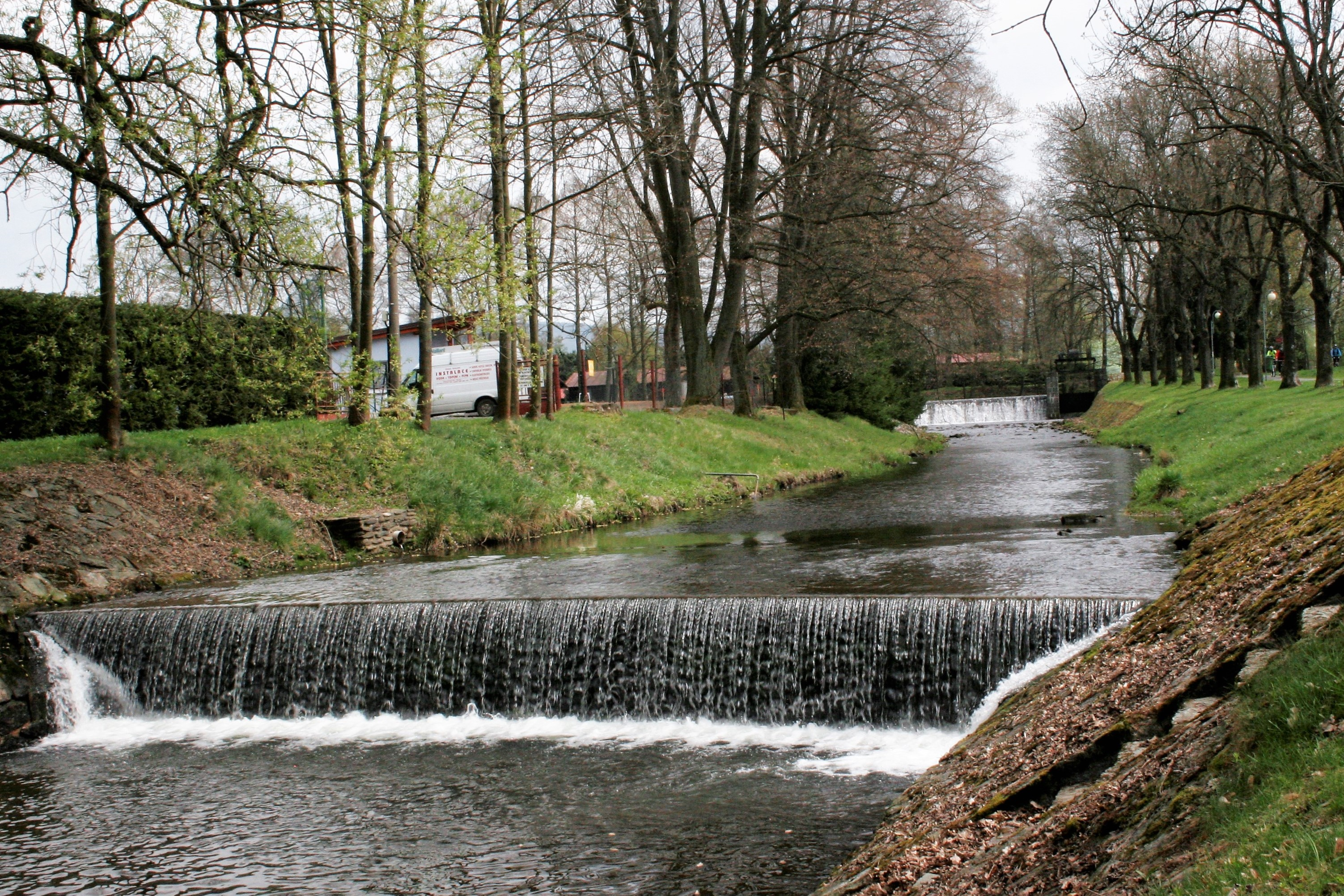
- The Úhlava in Nýrsko

Location
- Country: Czech Republic
- Region: Plzeň

Physical characteristics
- Source
  - location: Železná Ruda, Bohemian Forest
  - coordinates: 49°10′38″N 13°15′0″E
  - elevation: 1,153 m (3,783 ft)
- Mouth
  - location: Radbuza
  - coordinates: 49°43′14″N 13°23′19″E
  - elevation: 307 m (1,007 ft)
- Length: 104.0 km (64.6 mi)
- Basin size: 908.5 km^{2} (350.8 sq mi)
- Discharge
  - average: 5.71 m^{3}/s (202 cu ft/s) near estuary

Basin features
- Progression: Radbuza→ Berounka→ Vltava→ Elbe→ North Sea

The Úhlava (Czech pronunciation: [ˈuːɦlava]; German: Angel) is a river in the Czech Republic, a right tributary of the Radbuza River. It flows through the Plzeň Region to the city of Plzeň. It is 104.0 km (64.6 mi) long, making it the 19th longest river in the Czech Republic.

== Etymology ==
The name is probably derived from the Czech word úhel (i.e. 'angle'), which refers to its relatively tortuous course.

== Characteristic ==
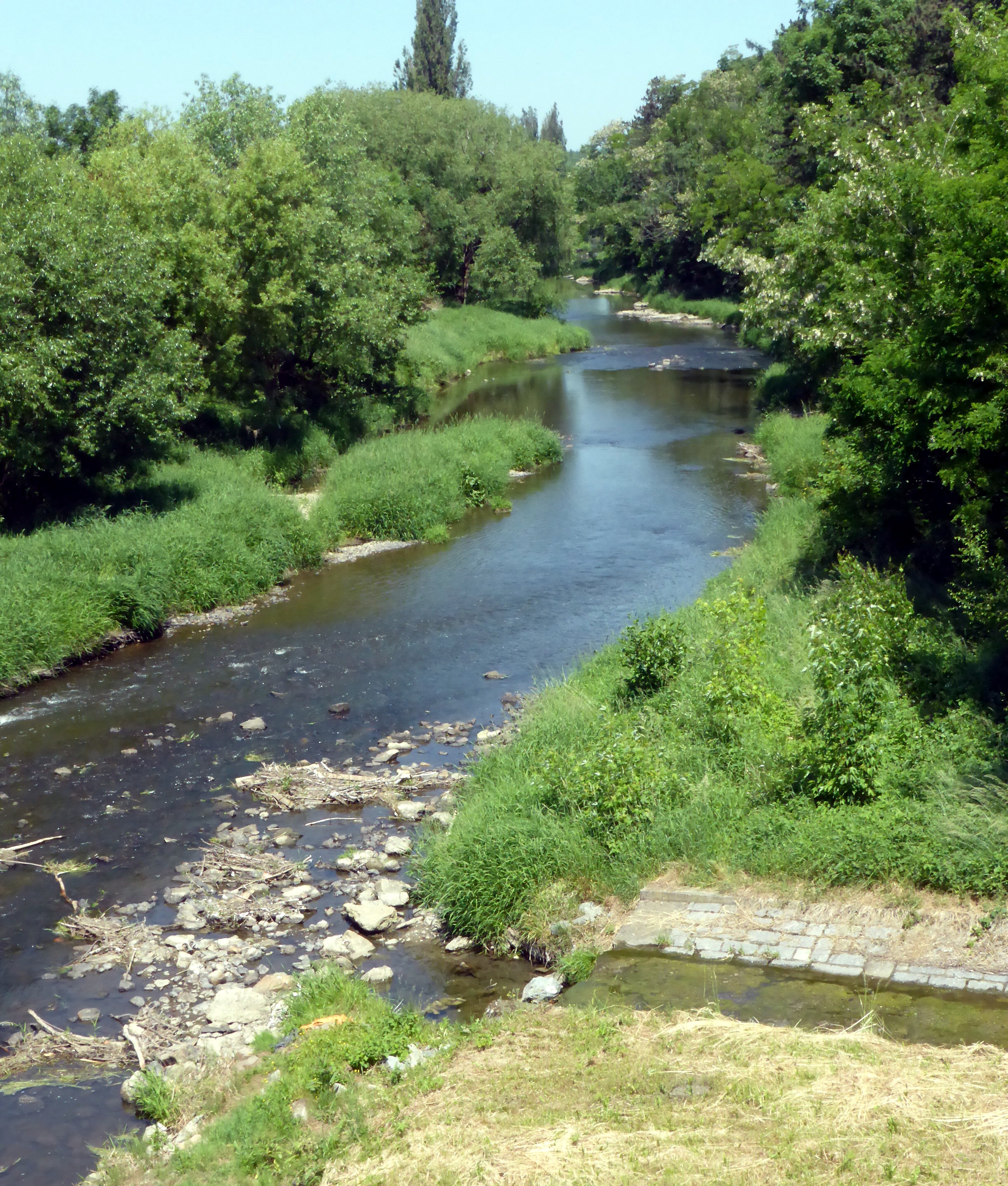
The Úhlava in Plzeň shortly before its mouth

The Úhlava originates in the territory of Železná Ruda in the Bohemian Forest at an elevation of 1,153 m (3,783 ft), on the slope of the Pancíř mountain, and flows to Plzeň, where it enters the Radbuza River at an elevation of 307 m (1,007 ft). It is 104.0 km (64.6 mi) long, making it the 19th longest river in the Czech Republic. Its drainage basin has an area of 908.5 km^{2} (350.8 sq mi).

The longest tributaries of the Úhlava are:

Tributary	Length (km)	River km	Side
Drnový potok	21.3	58.9	right
Poleňka	18.0	56.3	left
Jelenka	17.9	73.0	right
Točnický potok	17.6	50.7	right
Chodská Úhlava	17.0	80.2	left
Třebýcinka	12.5	46.4	left
Divoký potok	9.2	27.4	right
Zelenský potok	8.8	94.8	right

== Course ==
The river flows through the municipal territories of Železná Ruda, Hamry, Nýrsko, Janovice nad Úhlavou, Bezděkov, Klatovy, Dolany, Švihov, Červené Poříčí, Borovy, Nezdice, Lužany, Příchovice, Přeštice, Dolní Lukavice, Předenice, Čižice and Štěnovice before flowing into the Radbuza at the southern edge of Plzeň.

== Bodies of water ==
There are only 38 bodies of water larger than 1 ha in the basin area. The largest body of water is the Nýrsko Reservoir with an area of 138 ha (340 acres), built directly on the Úhlava. In the basin area is also Černé jezero – the largest natural lake in the Czech Republic.

== Sport ==
On the upper courses of the Úhlava, the Czech Paddler's Cup is held every year. It is organised by the Czech Canoe Union. Higher river flow at the time of the event is ensured by the organiser by draining water from the Nýrsko Reservoir.
