= Hamry (Klatovy District) =

- Municipality
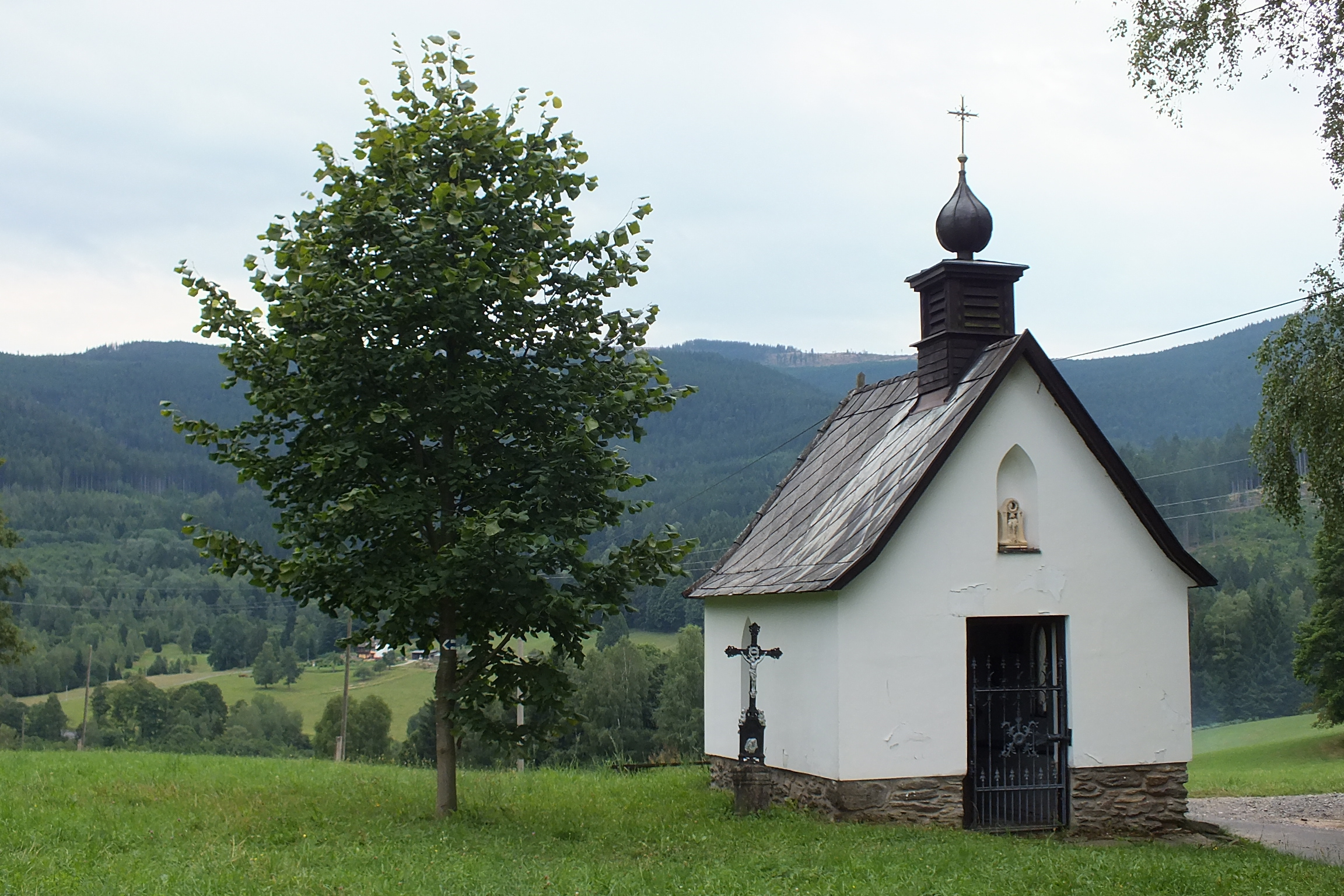
- Chapel in Hamry

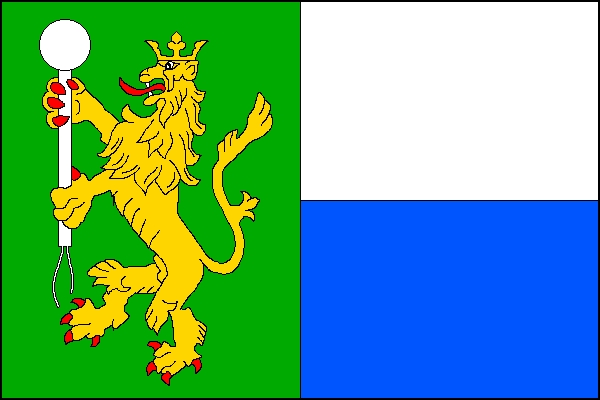
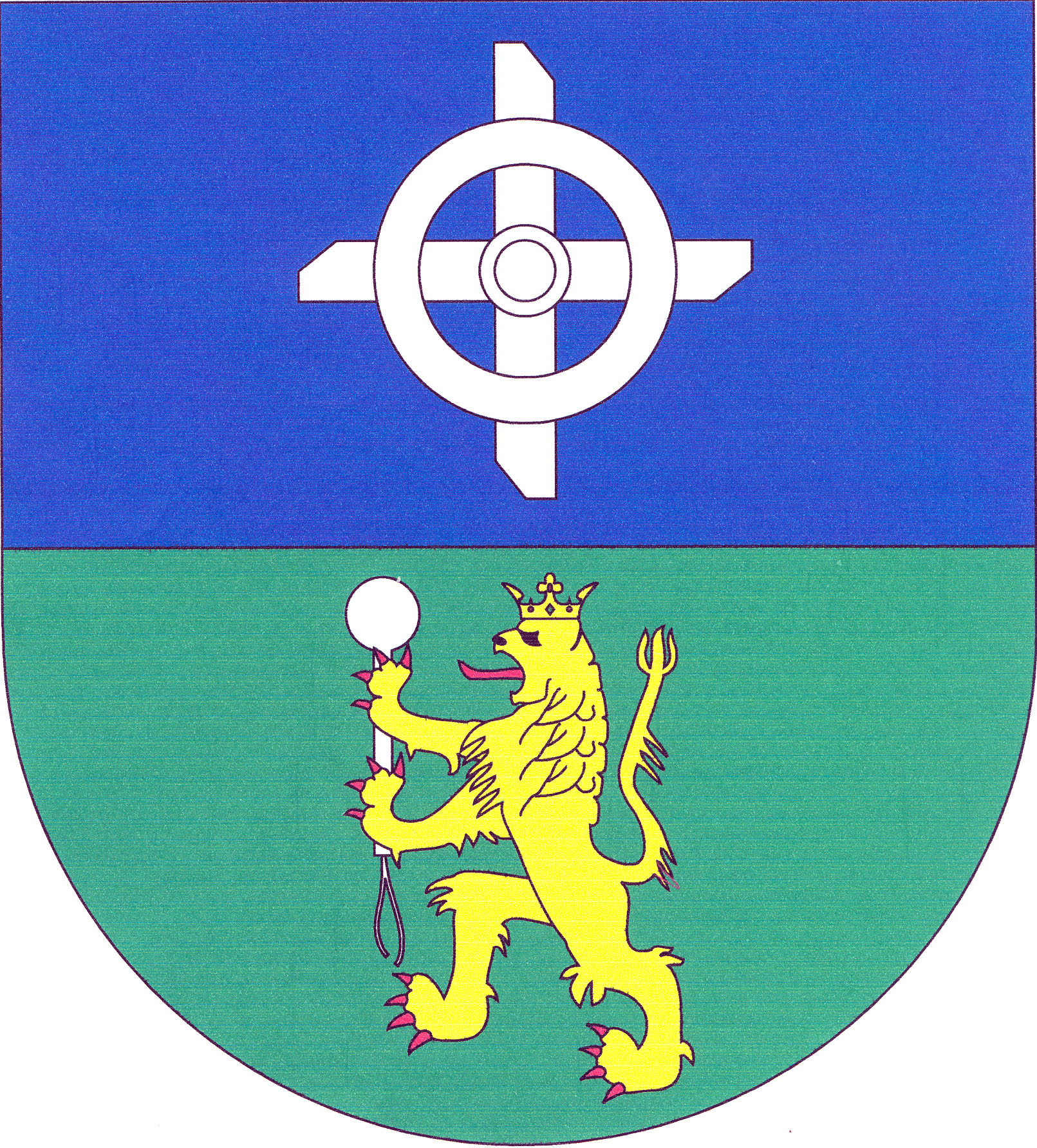
- Flag Coat of arms

- Location in the Czech Republic
- Coordinates: 49°12′55″N 13°9′38″E
- Country: Czech Republic
- Region: Plzeň
- District: Klatovy
- First mentioned: 1429

Area
  - Total: 36.90 km^{2} (14.25 sq mi)
- Elevation: 560 m (1,840 ft)

Population (2026-01-01)
  - Total: 108
  - Density: 2.93/km^{2} (7.58/sq mi)
- Time zone: UTC+1 (CET)
  - Summer (DST): UTC+2 (CEST)
- Postal code: 340 22
- Website: www.sumava.net/hamry/

Hamry (German: Hammern) is a municipality and village in Klatovy District in the Plzeň Region of the Czech Republic. It has about 100 inhabitants. The municipality is located on the Úhlava River in the Bohemian Forest mountain range.

== Etymology ==
The name Hamry means 'hammer mills' in Czech. It refers to the hammer mills that existed here from the 16th century.

== Geography ==
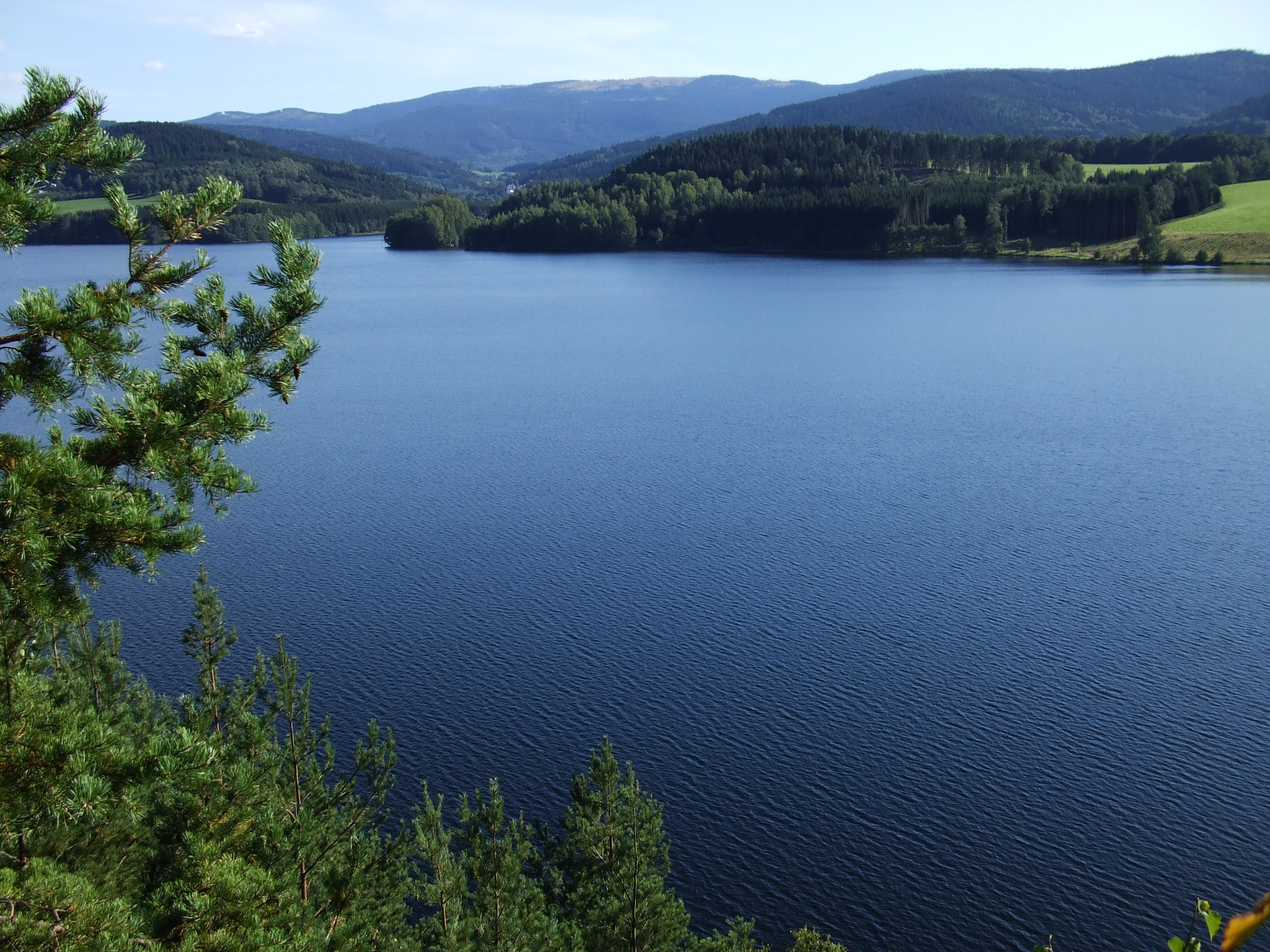
Nýrsko Reservoir

Hamry is located about 22 kilometres (14 mi) southwest of Klatovy and 59 km (37 mi) southwest of Plzeň. It lies in the Bohemian Forest mountain range, on the border with Germany. The highest point is the top of the mountain Osser/Ostrý at 1,293 m (4,242 ft) above sea level, located on the Czech–German border. The Úhlava River flows through the municipality.

Most of Nýrsko Reservoir is located in the municipal territory. It was built in 1964–1969 and has a 36 m (118 ft) high stone dam. It serves as a source of drinking water for the region.

== History ==
The first written mention of Hamry is from 1429. Between 1524 and 1535, one of the first hammer mills in the Bohemian Forest was founded here. After that, other hammer mills began to be built here, which processed the iron ore mined in the vicinity, and the village developed. Glass smelters, glass grinding plants, mills and sawmills were also established here.

Hamry had a German-speaking majority. After World War II, the Germans were expelled and the population significantly dropped.

== Demographics ==
Historical population

Year	Pop.	±%
1869	1,440	—
1880	1,446	+0.4%
1890	1,426	−1.4%
1900	1,282	−10.1%
1910	1,465	+14.3%

Year	Pop.	±%
1921	1,536	+4.8%
1930	1,606	+4.6%
1950	309	−80.8%
1961	253	−18.1%
1970	211	−16.6%

Year	Pop.	±%
1980	102	−51.7%
1991	101	−1.0%
2001	119	+17.8%
2011	106	−10.9%
2021	100	−5.7%

Source: Censuses

== Transport ==
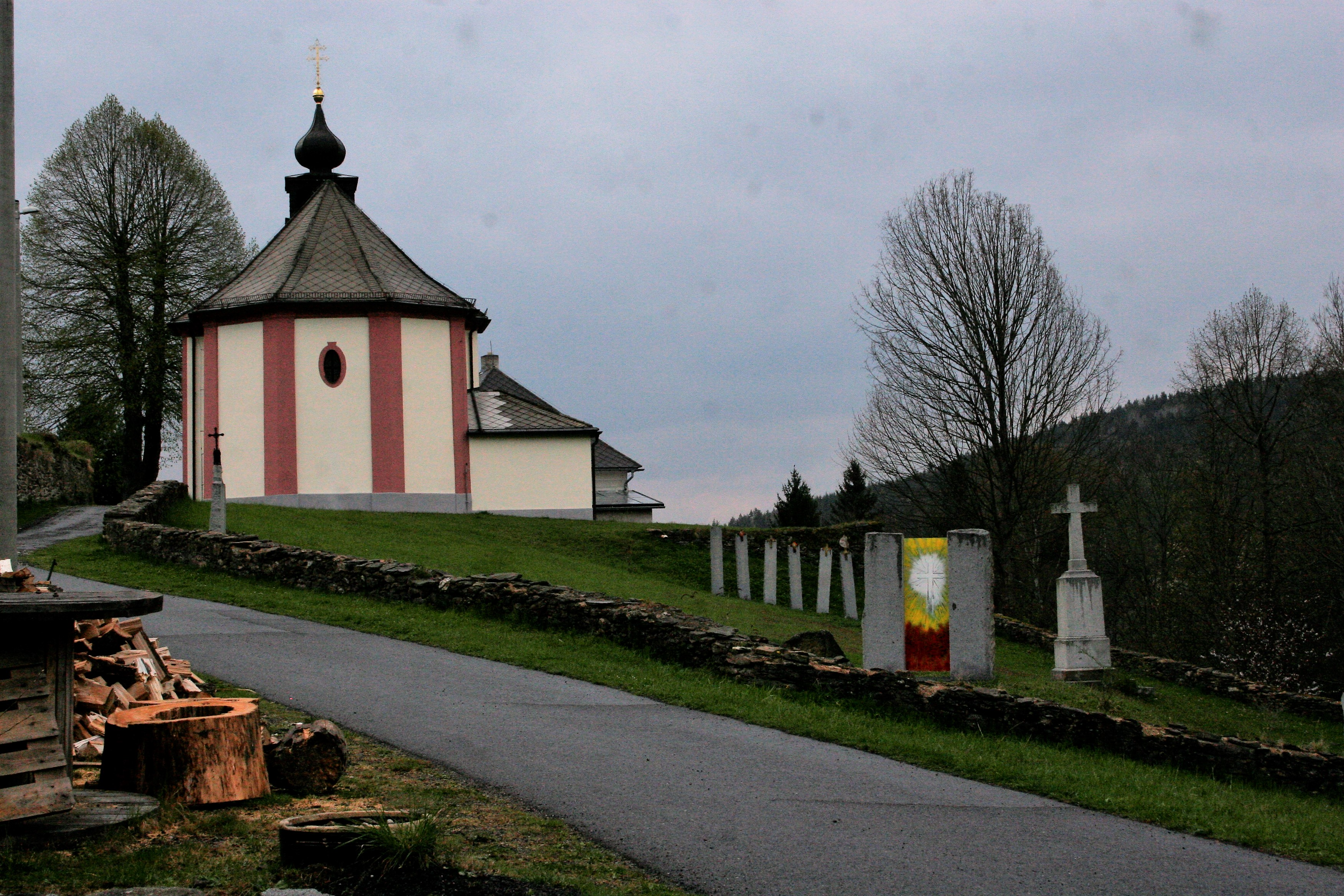
Church of Our Lady of Sorrows

Hamry is located on the main railway line Prague–Železná Ruda via Plzeň. The train station is called Hamry-Hojsova Stráž.

== Sights ==
The main landmark of Hamry is the Church of Our Lady of Sorrows. It was built in the Baroque style in 1773, on the site of an old chapel.
