= Štěnovice =

- Municipality
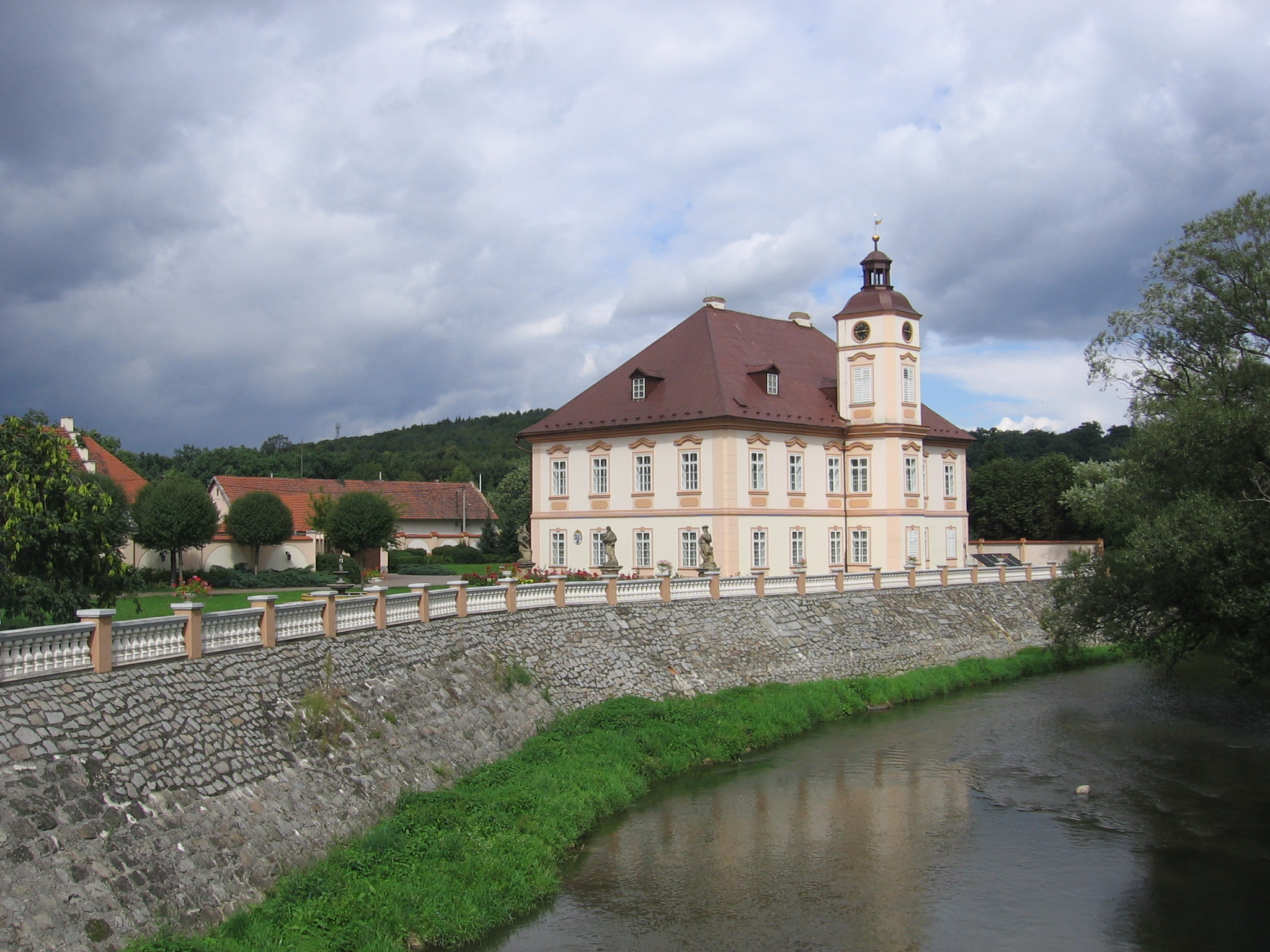
- Úhlava River and castle in Štěnovice

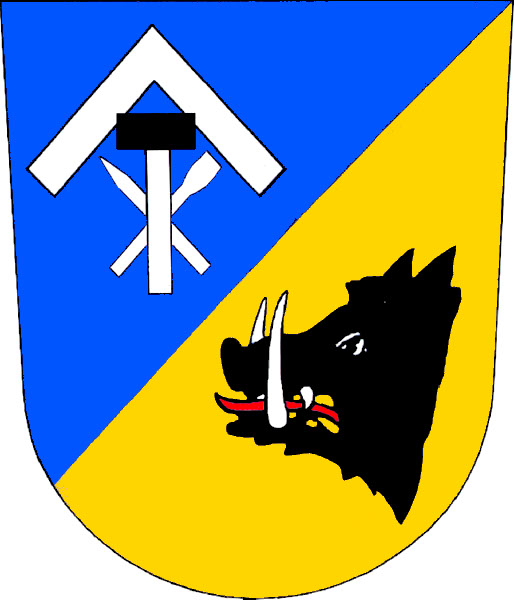
- Flag Coat of arms

- Location in the Czech Republic
- Coordinates: 49°40′14″N 13°24′0″E
- Country: Czech Republic
- Region: Plzeň
- District: Plzeň-South
- First mentioned: 1327

Area
  - Total: 7.67 km^{2} (2.96 sq mi)
- Elevation: 330 m (1,080 ft)

Population (2026-01-01)
  - Total: 2,356
  - Density: 307/km^{2} (796/sq mi)
- Time zone: UTC+1 (CET)
  - Summer (DST): UTC+2 (CEST)
- Postal code: 332 09
- Website: www.stenovice.cz

Štěnovice is a municipality and village in Plzeň-South District in the Plzeň Region of the Czech Republic. It has about 2,400 inhabitants.

== Etymology ==
The name is derived from the personal name Štěňa, meaning "the village of Štěňa's people".

== Geography ==
Štěnovice is located about 6 kilometres (4 mi) south of Plzeň. It lies in the Švihov Highlands. The highest point is a nameless hill at 472 m (1,549 ft) above sea level. The municipality is situated on the right bank of the Úhlava River.

== History ==
The first written mention of Štěnovice is from 1327. The village was owned by various lesser noble families. For a long time Štěnovice was owned by the Kadovský family (1460s–1554) and Henigars of Žeberk (1601–1697). Among the most important owners was Countess Terezie Pöttingová, who founded here a Trinitarian monastery with a church in 1747–1753.

== Demographics ==
Historical population

Year	Pop.	±%
1869	809	—
1880	884	+9.3%
1890	927	+4.9%
1900	1,166	+25.8%
1910	1,190	+2.1%

Year	Pop.	±%
1921	1,227	+3.1%
1930	1,294	+5.5%
1950	1,165	−10.0%
1961	1,290	+10.7%
1970	1,242	−3.7%

Year	Pop.	±%
1980	1,157	−6.8%
1991	1,188	+2.7%
2001	1,331	+12.0%
2011	1,852	+39.1%
2021	2,225	+20.1%

Source: Censuses

== Transport ==
The D5 motorway from Prague to Plzeň (part of the European route E50) runs along the northern municipal border.

== Sights ==
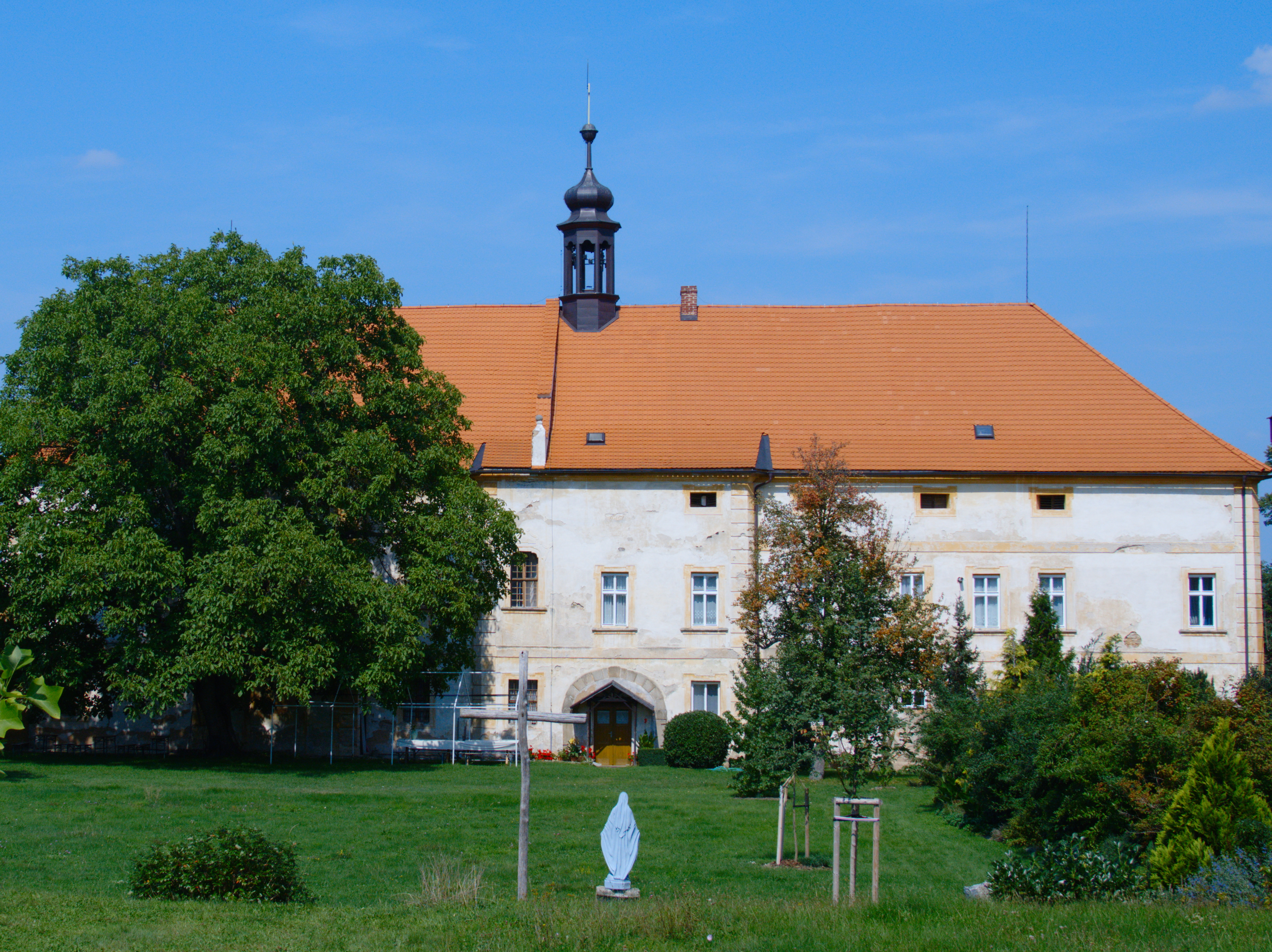
Former monastery

The main landmark of the centre of Štěnovice is the Trinitarian monastery with the Church of Saint Procopius. They were built in the Baroque style in 1747–1753, by rebuilding an early Baroque granary. The parish church still serves its purpose. The former monastery is partly used as an apartment and partly unused.

The Štěnovice Castle is located on the opposite bank of the Úhlava River from the rest of the village. It was built in the Baroque style in 1723. Next to the castle is a small park with quality Baroque sculptural decoration. Today the castle is privately used and is occasionally used for social purposes.
