= Nýrsko =

- Town
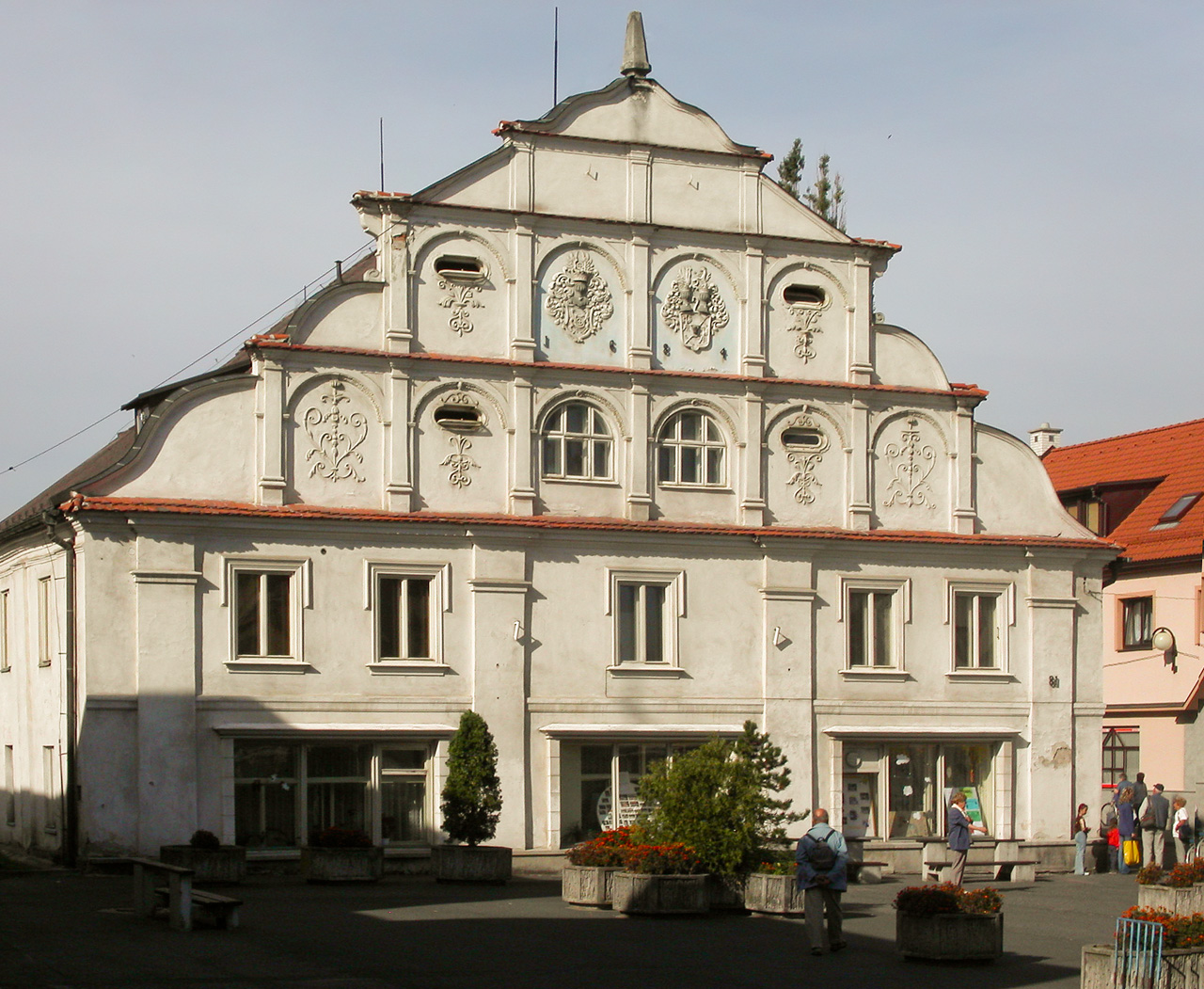
- Municipal library on the town square

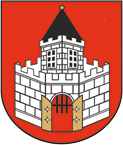
- Coat of arms

- Location in the Czech Republic
- Coordinates: 49°17′38″N 13°8′37″E
- Country: Czech Republic
- Region: Plzeň
- District: Klatovy
- First mentioned: 1327

Government
  - Mayor: Miloslav Rubáš

Area
  - Total: 31.53 km^{2} (12.17 sq mi)
- Elevation: 452 m (1,483 ft)

Population (2026-01-01)
  - Total: 5,023
  - Density: 159.3/km^{2} (412.6/sq mi)
- Time zone: UTC+1 (CET)
  - Summer (DST): UTC+2 (CEST)
- Postal code: 340 22
- Website: www.mestonyrsko.cz

Nýrsko (Czech pronunciation: [ˈniːrsko]; German: Neuern) is a town in Klatovy District in the Plzeň Region of the Czech Republic. It has about 5,000 inhabitants. The town is located on the Úhlava River, on the border between the Bohemian Forest Foothills and the Bohemian Forest mountain range.

Nýrsko was probably founded in the 12th century. The main landmark of the town is the Church of Saint Thomas the Apostle.

== Administrative division ==
Nýrsko consists of seven municipal parts (in brackets population according to the 2021 census):

- Nýrsko (3,985)
- Blata (15)
- Bystřice nad Úhlavou (374)
- Hodousice (107)
- Stará Lhota (49)
- Starý Láz (39)
- Zelená Lhota (184)

Zelená Lhota forms an exclave of the municipal territory.

== Etymology ==
The suffix -sko in the name of Nýrsko indicates that the settlement was founded on the site of another village, which was abandoned, and the new village was named after its predecessor. The predecessor of Nýrsko was probably a village called Nýřany, with roots in the old Czech words nyra ('burrow') and nyřan (a person living in a burrow).

== Geography ==
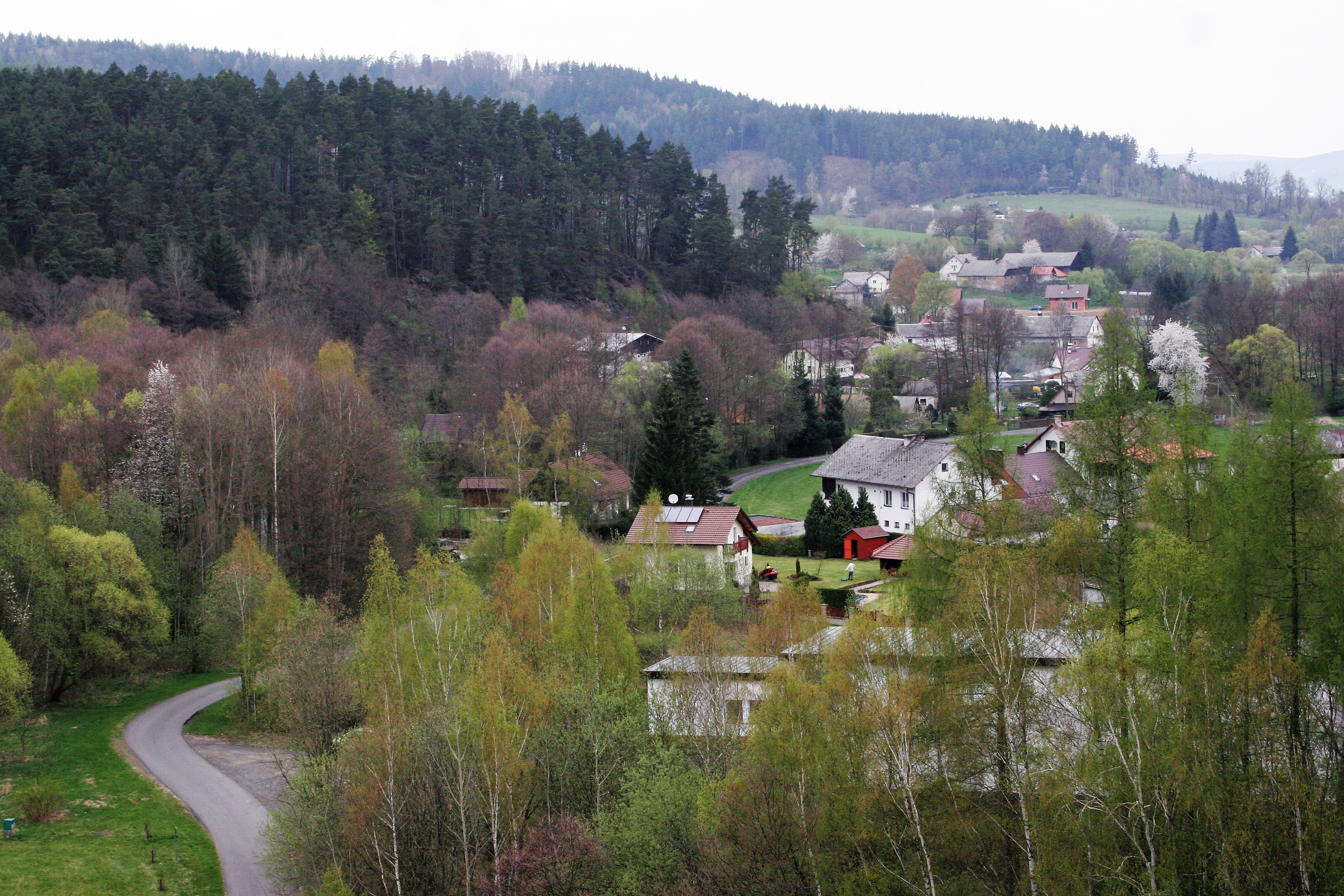
Area under the dam

Nýrsko is located about 15 kilometres (9 mi) southwest of Klatovy and 52 km (32 mi) south of Plzeň. Most of the municipal territory lies in the Bohemian Forest Foothills, but the southern part and the exclave lie in the Bohemian Forest. The highest point is a contour line on the slopes of the mountain Malý Prenet at 860 m (2,820 ft) above sea level. The Úhlava River flows through the town.

A small part of Nýrsko Reservoir is located in the municipal territory. It was built in 1964–1969 and has a 36 m (118 ft) high stone dam. It serves as a source of drinking water for the region.

== History ==
The first written mention of Nýrsko is from 1327. The settlement was probably founded in the 12th century. It was situated on the trade route to Bavaria near a ford across the Úhlava. A custom house was located here.

The lower part of the town called Dolní Nýrsko ('lower Nýrsko') was owned by the royal chamber, and the upper part, Horní Nýrsko ('upper Nýrsko'), was a market village under the ownership of the Pajrek Castle. In 1558, Horní Nýrsko joined Dolní Nýrsko and both became property of the municipality of Bystřice nad Úhlavou. The town developed and grew quickly at that time, and it obtained many rights and privileges from Emperor Rudolf II in 1593.

The development continued in the 19th century when the town was industrialised. There were factories for matches and for linen, a tannery, a steam saw, two mills and a glass grinder. The turning point was primarily the start of production of optical products in 1895.

== Demographics ==
Historical population

Year	Pop.	±%
1869	3,323	—
1880	3,762	+13.2%
1890	3,778	+0.4%
1900	3,932	+4.1%
1910	4,572	+16.3%

Year	Pop.	±%
1921	5,032	+10.1%
1930	5,705	+13.4%
1950	4,390	−23.0%
1961	4,270	−2.7%
1970	4,494	+5.2%

Year	Pop.	±%
1980	4,864	+8.2%
1991	4,989	+2.6%
2001	5,109	+2.4%
2011	4,990	−2.3%
2021	4,753	−4.7%

Source: Censuses

== Economy ==
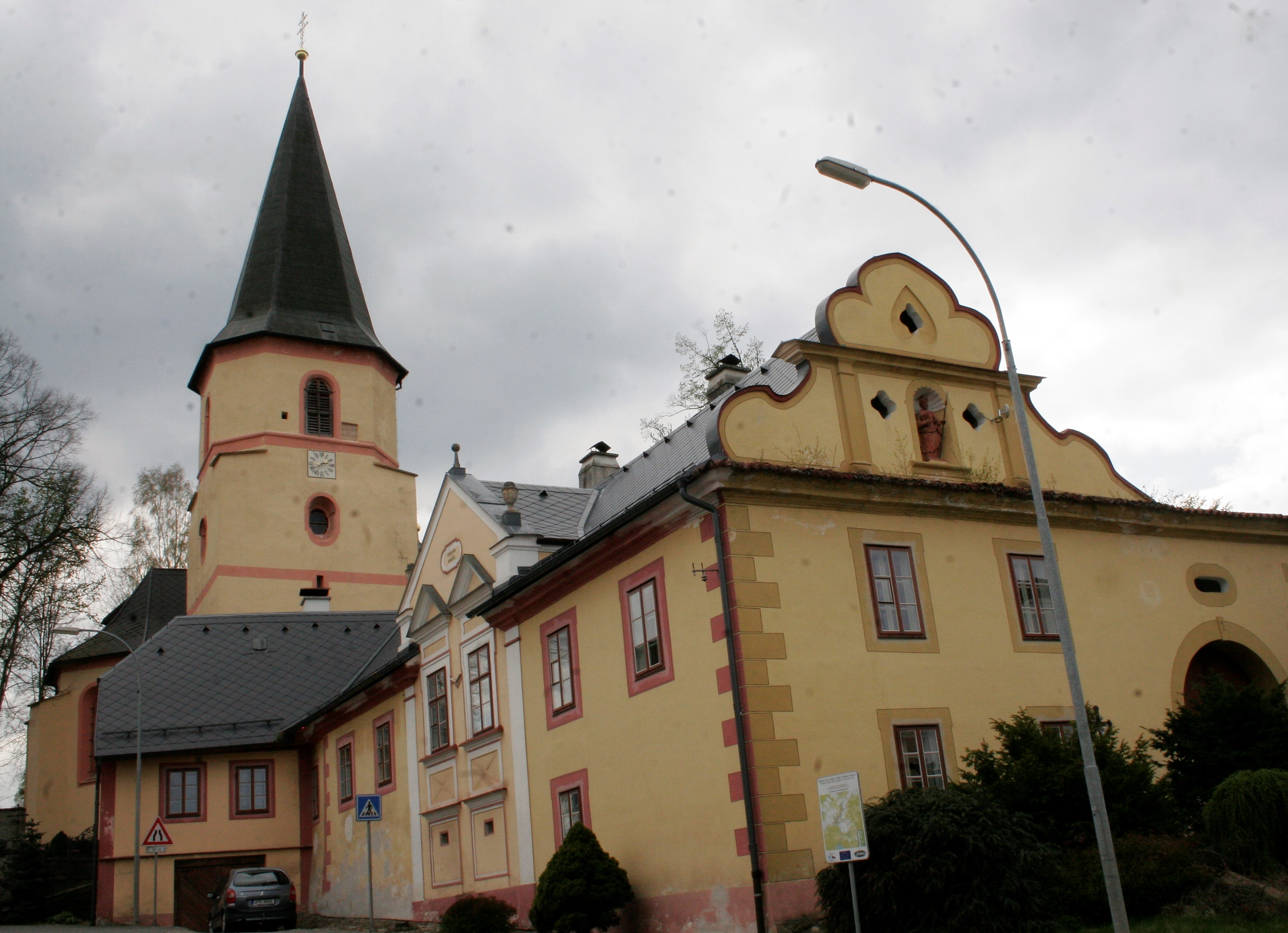
Church of Saint Thomas the Apostle

The town is known for Okula Nýrsko, which was a major manufacturer of spectacle optics and mechanics. The local production started already in 1895, when the company was moved from Vienna. Nowadays, the company is still an important regional employer, but the production specialises mainly in plastics.

== Transport ==
Nýrsko is located on the railway line Prague–Plzeň–Železná Ruda and thus has a direct connection to the capital.

== Sights ==
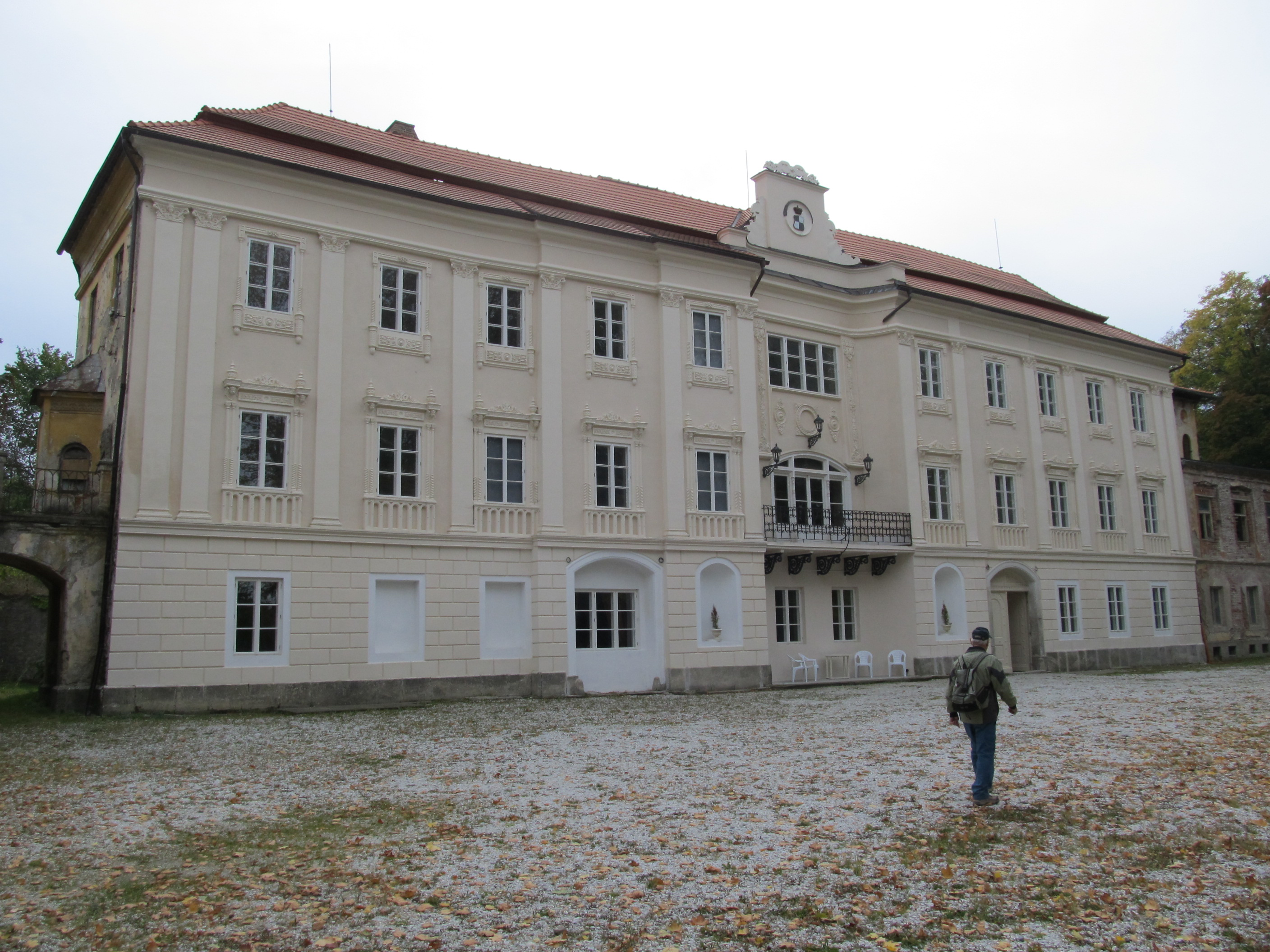
Bystřice nad Úhlavou Castle

The main landmark of Nýrsko is the Church of Saint Thomas the Apostle. It was first mentioned in 1352 and it is the oldest building in Nýrsko. The Gothic church was extended in the second half of the 14th century, then early Baroque modification were made in the 17th century and further Baroque modifications in the 18th century.

In Bystřice nad Úhlavou is the Bystřice nad Úhlavou Castle. A fortress in the area existed in 1339 at the latest. In 1444, it was rebuilt in the Gothic style and extended into a castle. Renaissance modifications were made at the turn of the 16th and 17th centuries. The building acquired its current appearance during the reconstruction by its owner Count Hohenzollern-Sigmaringen in 1848–1853, mostly in the pseudo-Romanesque and pseudo-Gothic styles. Because of the unusual combination of the aforementioned styles, the castle is not artistically valuable.

Pajrek Castle is a castle ruin located on a hill, south of the town. The castle was founded at the beginning of the 14th century. From the mid-16th century it was permanently abandoned. The preserved remains of the palace walls and the tower are freely accessible.

== Notable people ==
- Jan Hošek (born 1989), footballer
- Petr Hošek (born 1989), footballer
