= Pajrek Castle =

Ruined castle in the Plzeň Region, Czech Republic

Coordinates: 49°16′37.88″N 13°08′14.46″E

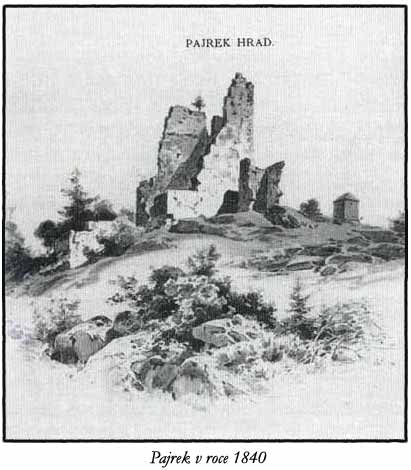

The ruins of the Pajrek Castle (German: Burg Bayereck) lie in the Czech Republic above the town of Nýrsko, in the western part of the Bohemian Forest at a height of 505 metres above sea level.

This important border castle was built at the beginning of the 14th century, but by 1472 it had already been abandoned. In 1504, the castle was rebuilt, but it was only used until the middle of the 16th century, when it was finally abandoned. Only the remains of the huge tower have survived.

== Gallery ==
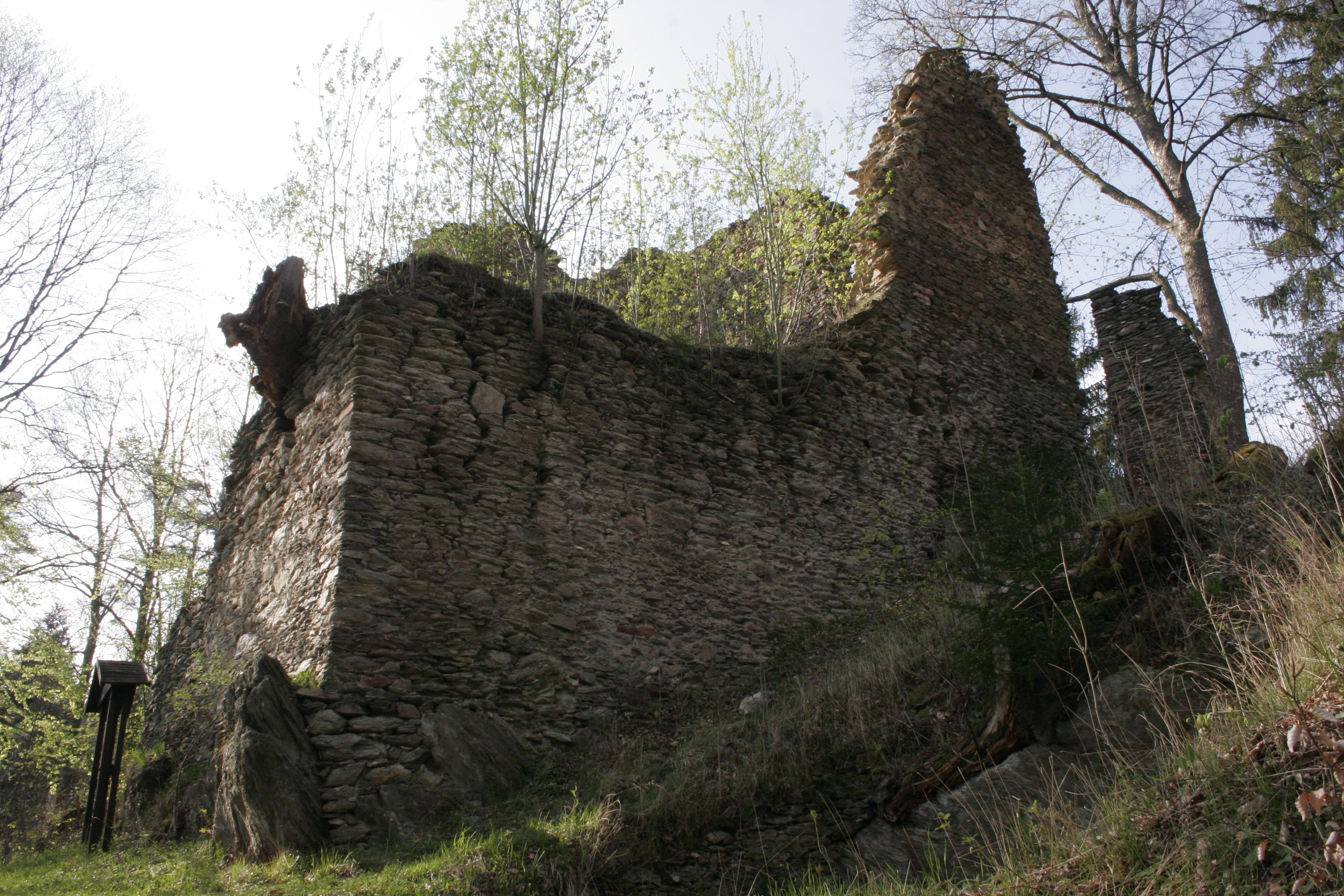

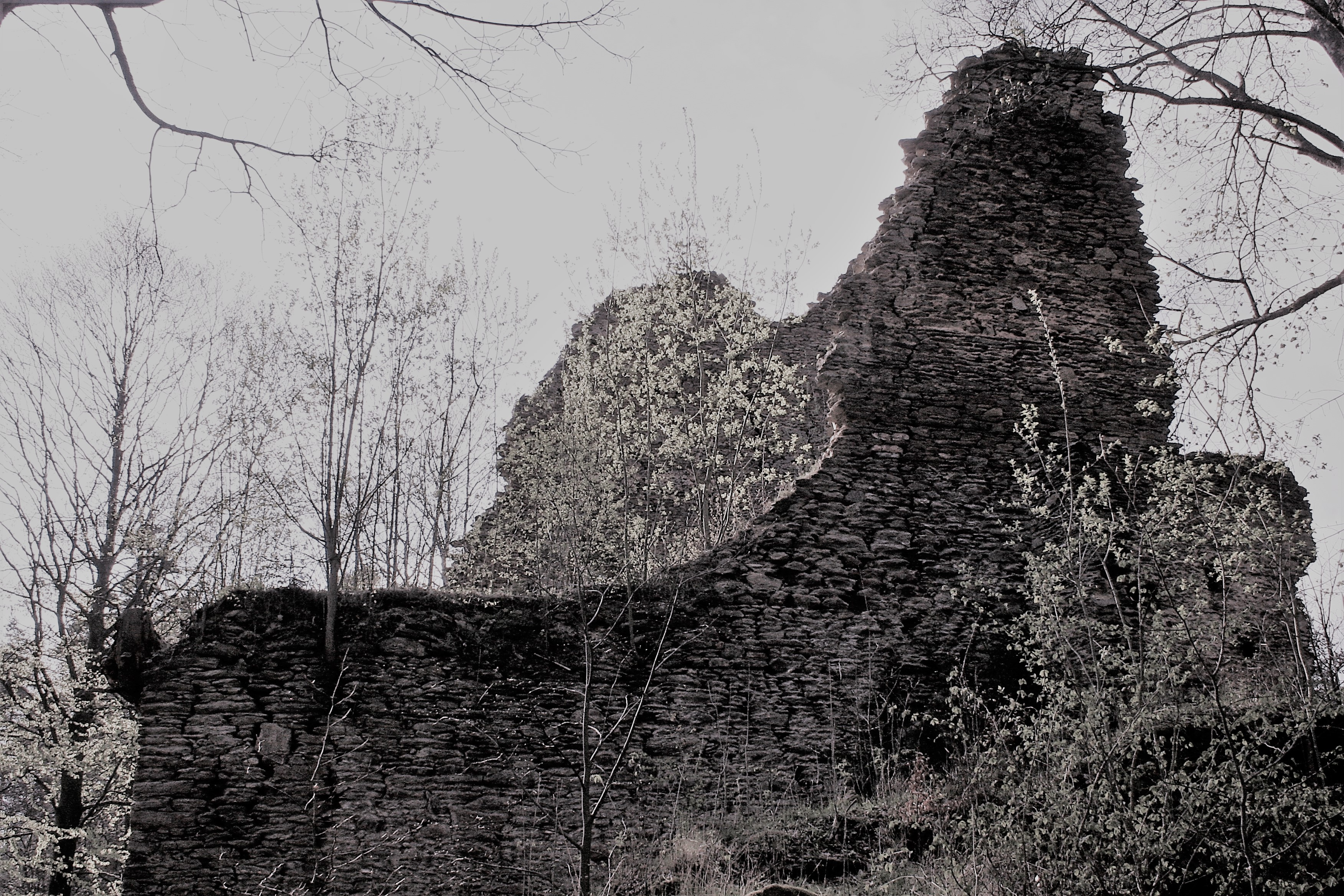

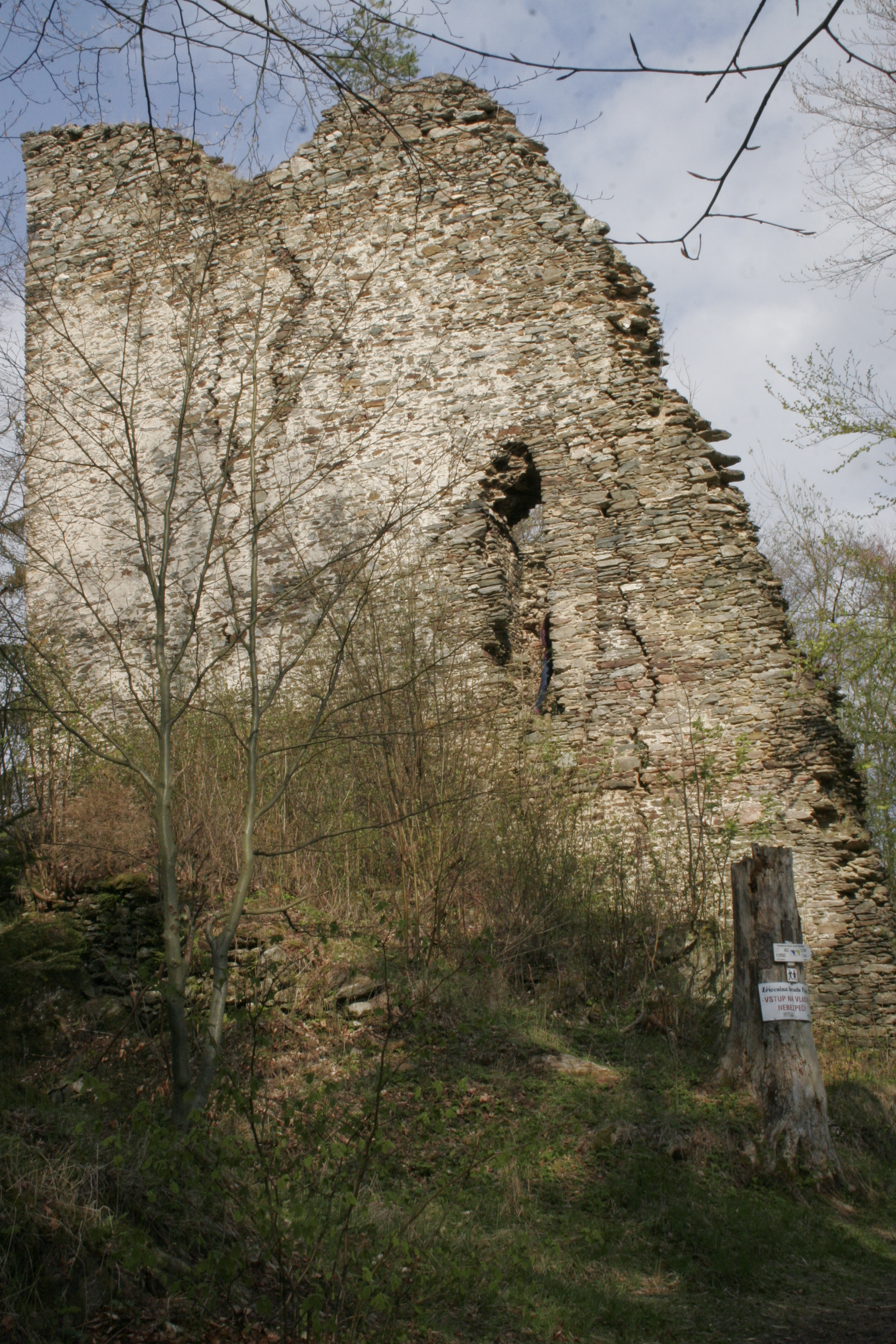
