= Příchovice =

- Municipality
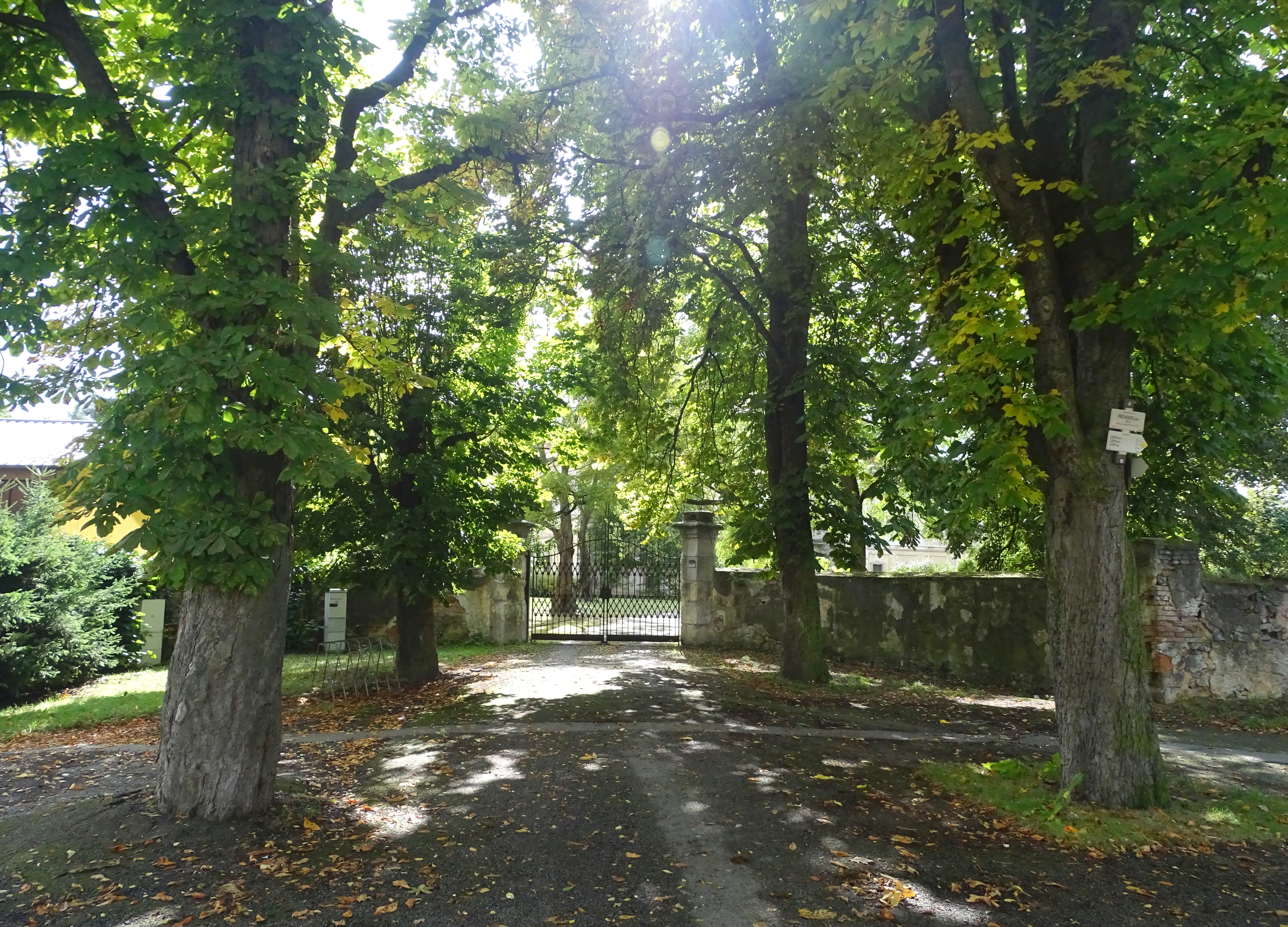
- Entrance into the Příchovice Castle

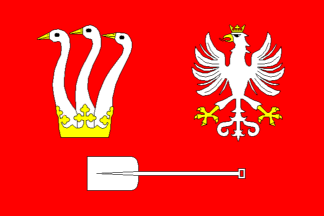
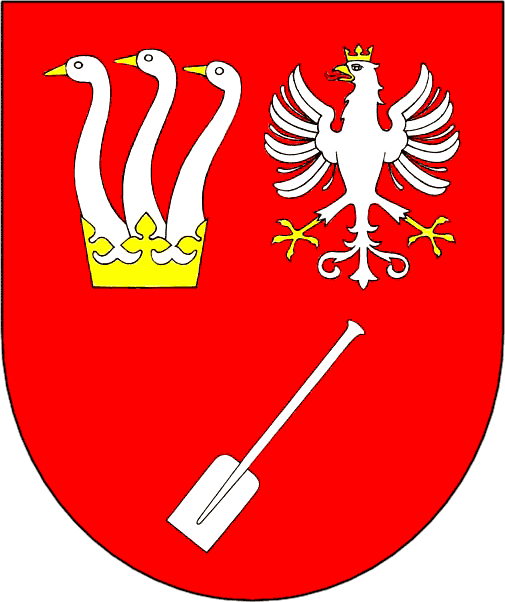
- Flag Coat of arms

- Location in the Czech Republic
- Coordinates: 49°33′34″N 13°20′30″E
- Country: Czech Republic
- Region: Plzeň
- District: Plzeň-South
- First mentioned: 1328

Area
  - Total: 11.79 km^{2} (4.55 sq mi)
- Elevation: 358 m (1,175 ft)

Population (2026-01-01)
  - Total: 1,233
  - Density: 104.6/km^{2} (270.9/sq mi)
- Time zone: UTC+1 (CET)
  - Summer (DST): UTC+2 (CEST)
- Postal code: 334 01
- Website: www.prichovice.cz

Příchovice is a municipality and village in Plzeň-South District in the Plzeň Region of the Czech Republic. It has about 1,200 inhabitants.

Příchovice lies approximately 22 kilometres (14 mi) south of Plzeň and 98 km (61 mi) south-west of Prague.

== Administrative division ==
Příchovice consists of three municipal parts (in brackets population according to the 2021 census):

- Příchovice (958)
- Kucíny (122)
- Zálesí (77)

== Demographics ==
Historical population
Year	Pop.	±%
1869	911	—
1880	907	−0.4%
1890	911	+0.4%
1900	923	+1.3%
1910	941	+2.0%
1921	1,015	+7.9%
1930	1,123	+10.6%
1950	961	−14.4%
1961	963	+0.2%
1970	921	−4.4%
1980	900	−2.3%
1991	841	−6.6%
2001	920	+9.4%
2011	1,002	+8.9%
2021	1,157	+15.5%
Source: Censuses
