= Předenice =

- Municipality
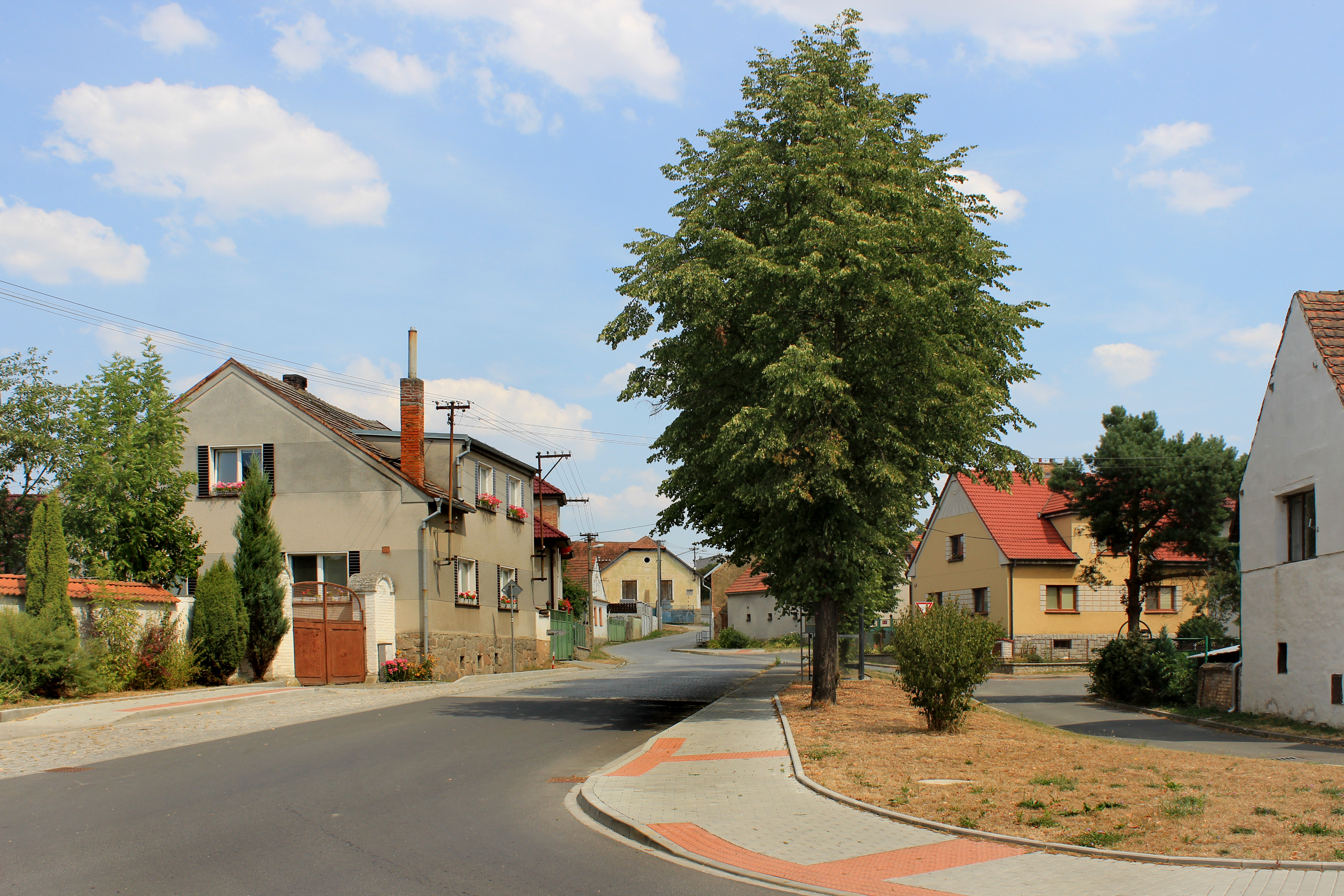
- Centre of Předenice

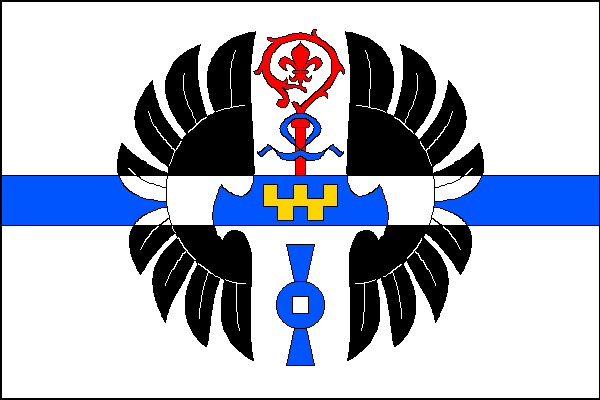
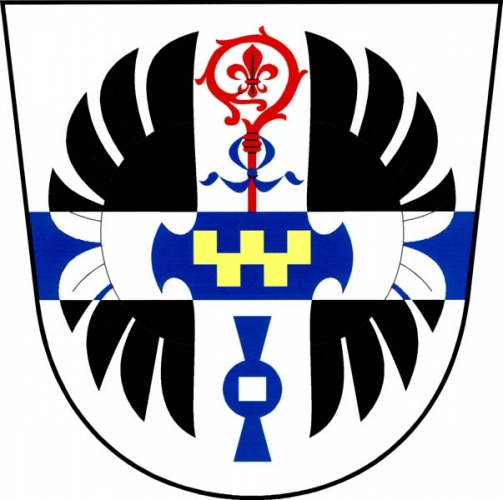
- Flag Coat of arms

- Location in the Czech Republic
- Coordinates: 49°37′28″N 13°23′48″E
- Country: Czech Republic
- Region: Plzeň
- District: Plzeň-South
- First mentioned: 1239

Area
  - Total: 4.38 km^{2} (1.69 sq mi)
- Elevation: 340 m (1,120 ft)

Population (2026-01-01)
  - Total: 254
  - Density: 58.0/km^{2} (150/sq mi)
- Time zone: UTC+1 (CET)
  - Summer (DST): UTC+2 (CEST)
- Postal code: 332 09
- Website: www.predenice.cz

Předenice is a municipality and village in Plzeň-South District in the Plzeň Region of the Czech Republic. It has about 300 inhabitants.

Předenice lies approximately 15 kilometres (9 mi) south of Plzeň and 90 km (56 mi) south-west of Prague.

== Demographics ==
Historical population
Year	Pop.	±%
1869	260	—
1880	290	+11.5%
1890	296	+2.1%
1900	295	−0.3%
1910	303	+2.7%
1921	292	−3.6%
1930	298	+2.1%
1950	248	−16.8%
1961	250	+0.8%
1970	199	−20.4%
1980	190	−4.5%
1991	168	−11.6%
2001	167	−0.6%
2011	208	+24.6%
2021	257	+23.6%
Source: Censuses
