= Nezdice =

- Municipality
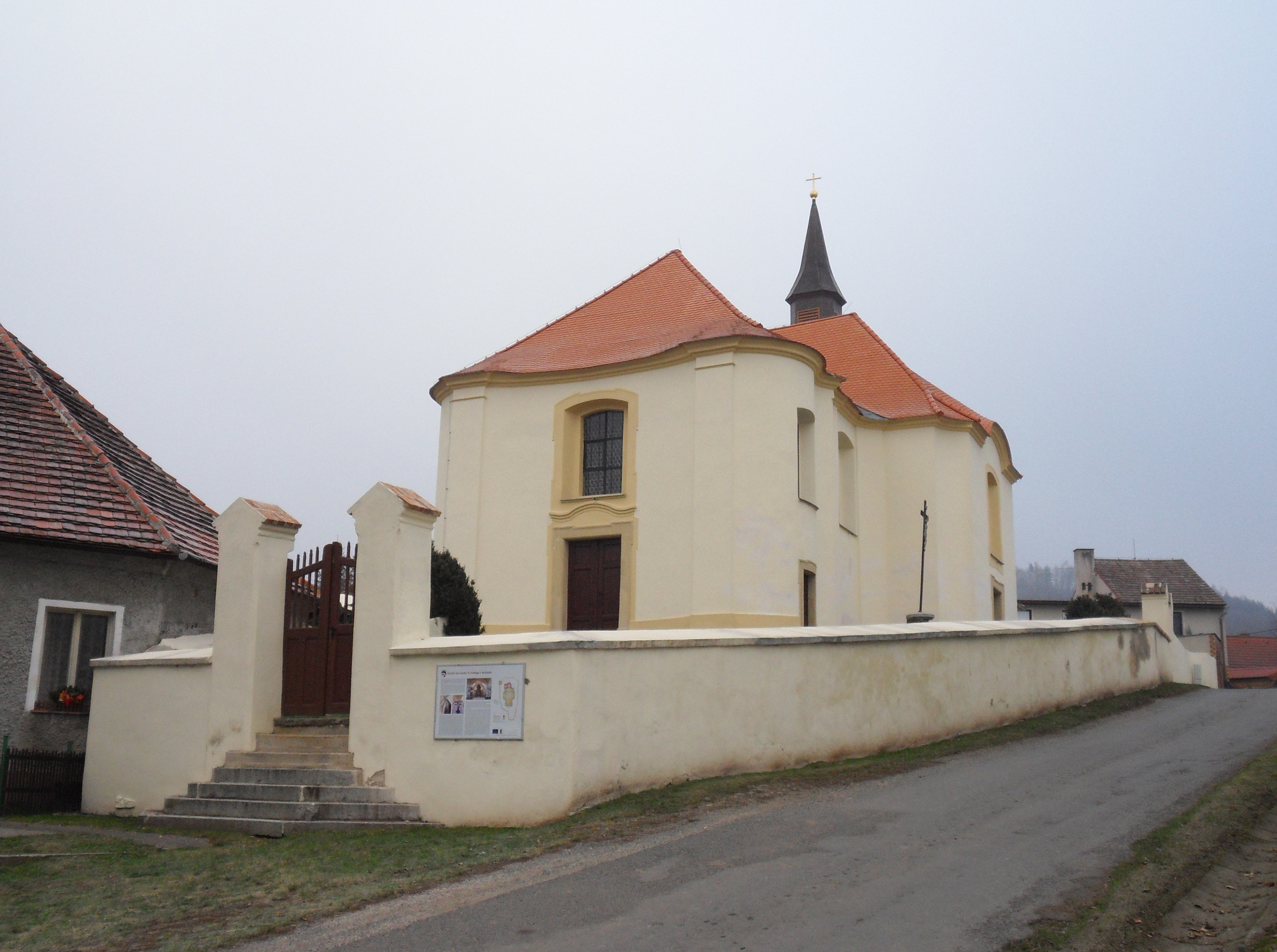
- Church of Saint Procopius

- Flag Coat of arms

- Location in the Czech Republic
- Coordinates: 49°31′54″N 13°19′0″E
- Country: Czech Republic
- Region: Plzeň
- District: Plzeň-South
- First mentioned: 1243

Area
  - Total: 6.37 km^{2} (2.46 sq mi)
- Elevation: 368 m (1,207 ft)

Population (2026-01-01)
  - Total: 206
  - Density: 32.3/km^{2} (83.8/sq mi)
- Time zone: UTC+1 (CET)
  - Summer (DST): UTC+2 (CEST)
- Postal code: 334 01
- Website: www.obec-nezdice.cz

Nezdice is a municipality and village in Plzeň-South District in the Plzeň Region of the Czech Republic. It has about 200 inhabitants.

Nezdice lies approximately 25 kilometres (16 mi) south of Plzeň and 101 km (63 mi) south-west of Prague.

== Demographics ==
Historical population
Year	Pop.	±%
1869	399	—
1880	463	+16.0%
1890	397	−14.3%
1900	395	−0.5%
1910	435	+10.1%
1921	480	+10.3%
1930	447	−6.9%
1950	375	−16.1%
1961	376	+0.3%
1970	301	−19.9%
1980	242	−19.6%
1991	215	−11.2%
2001	198	−7.9%
2011	208	+5.1%
2021	202	−2.9%
Source: Censuses
