= Borovy =

- Municipality
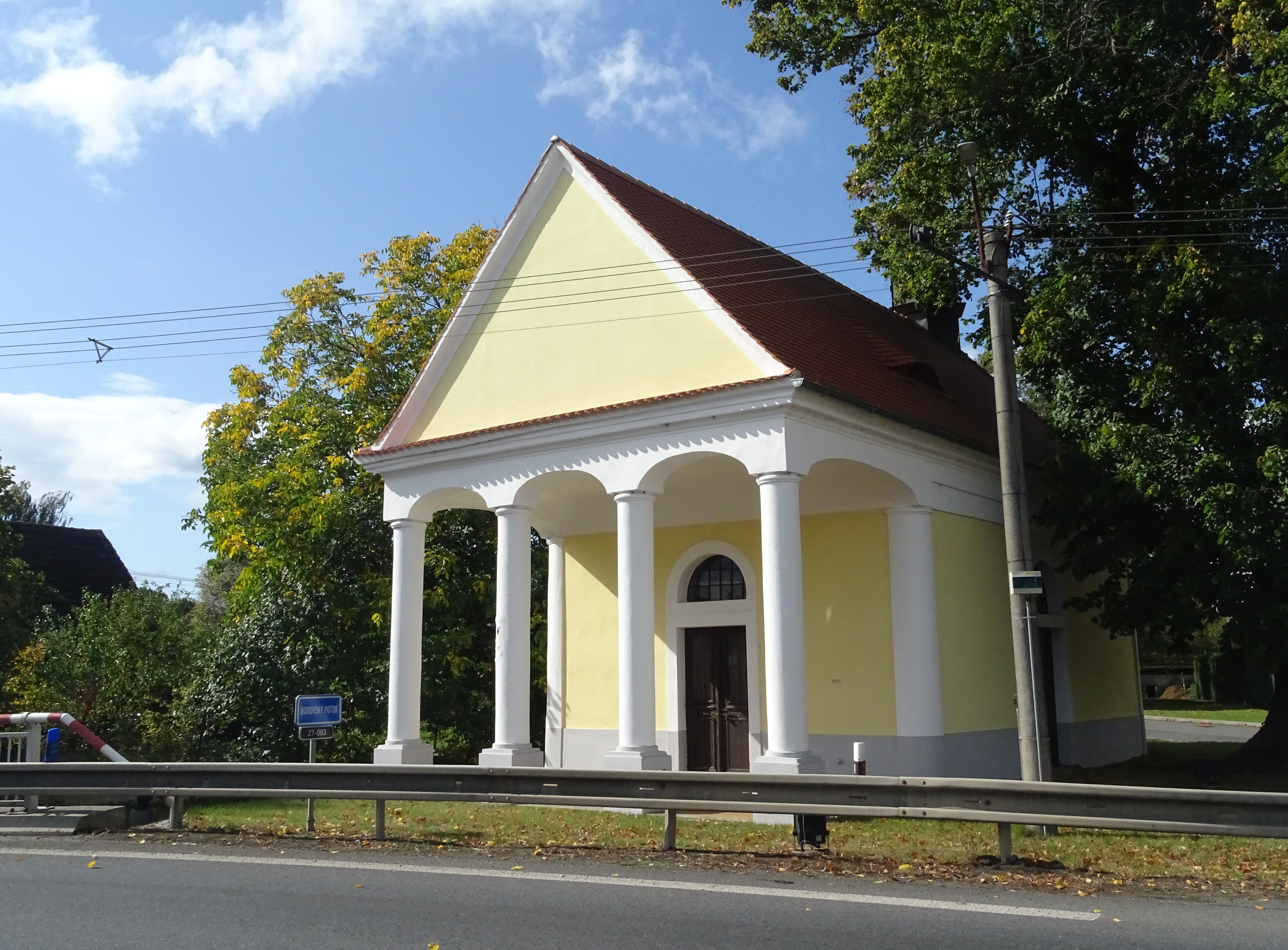
- Chapel of the Nativity of the Virgin Mary

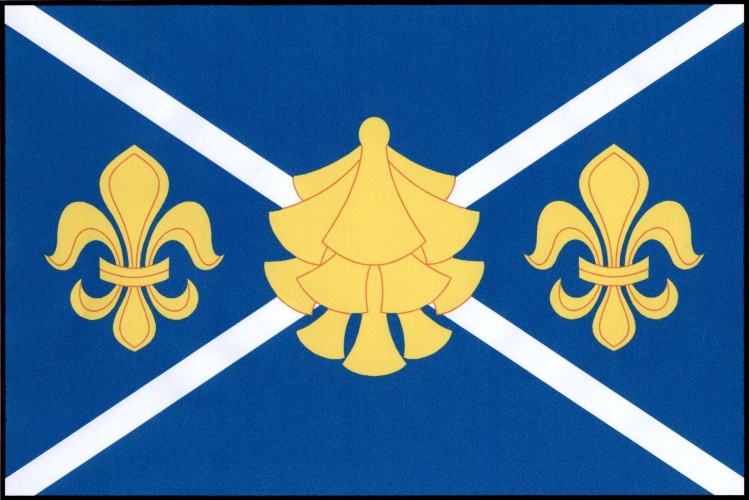
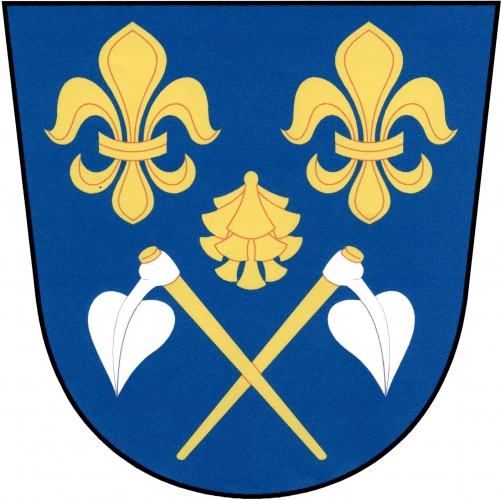
- Flag Coat of arms

- Location in the Czech Republic
- Coordinates: 49°31′31″N 13°18′9″E
- Country: Czech Republic
- Region: Plzeň
- District: Plzeň-South
- First mentioned: 1358

Area
  - Total: 4.24 km^{2} (1.64 sq mi)
- Elevation: 363 m (1,191 ft)

Population (2026-01-01)
  - Total: 217
  - Density: 51.2/km^{2} (133/sq mi)
- Time zone: UTC+1 (CET)
  - Summer (DST): UTC+2 (CEST)
- Postal code: 334 01
- Website: www.borovy.cz

Borovy is a municipality and village in Plzeň-South District in the Plzeň Region of the Czech Republic. It has about 200 inhabitants.

Borovy lies approximately 26 kilometres (16 mi) south of Plzeň and 102 km (63 mi) south-west of Prague.

== Demographics ==
Historical population
Year	Pop.	±%
1869	304	—
1880	366	+20.4%
1890	367	+0.3%
1900	320	−12.8%
1910	333	+4.1%
1921	345	+3.6%
1930	396	+14.8%
1950	360	−9.1%
1961	354	−1.7%
1970	311	−12.1%
1980	264	−15.1%
1991	260	−1.5%
2001	235	−9.6%
2011	222	−5.5%
2021	225	+1.4%
Source: Censuses
