= Čižice =

- Municipality
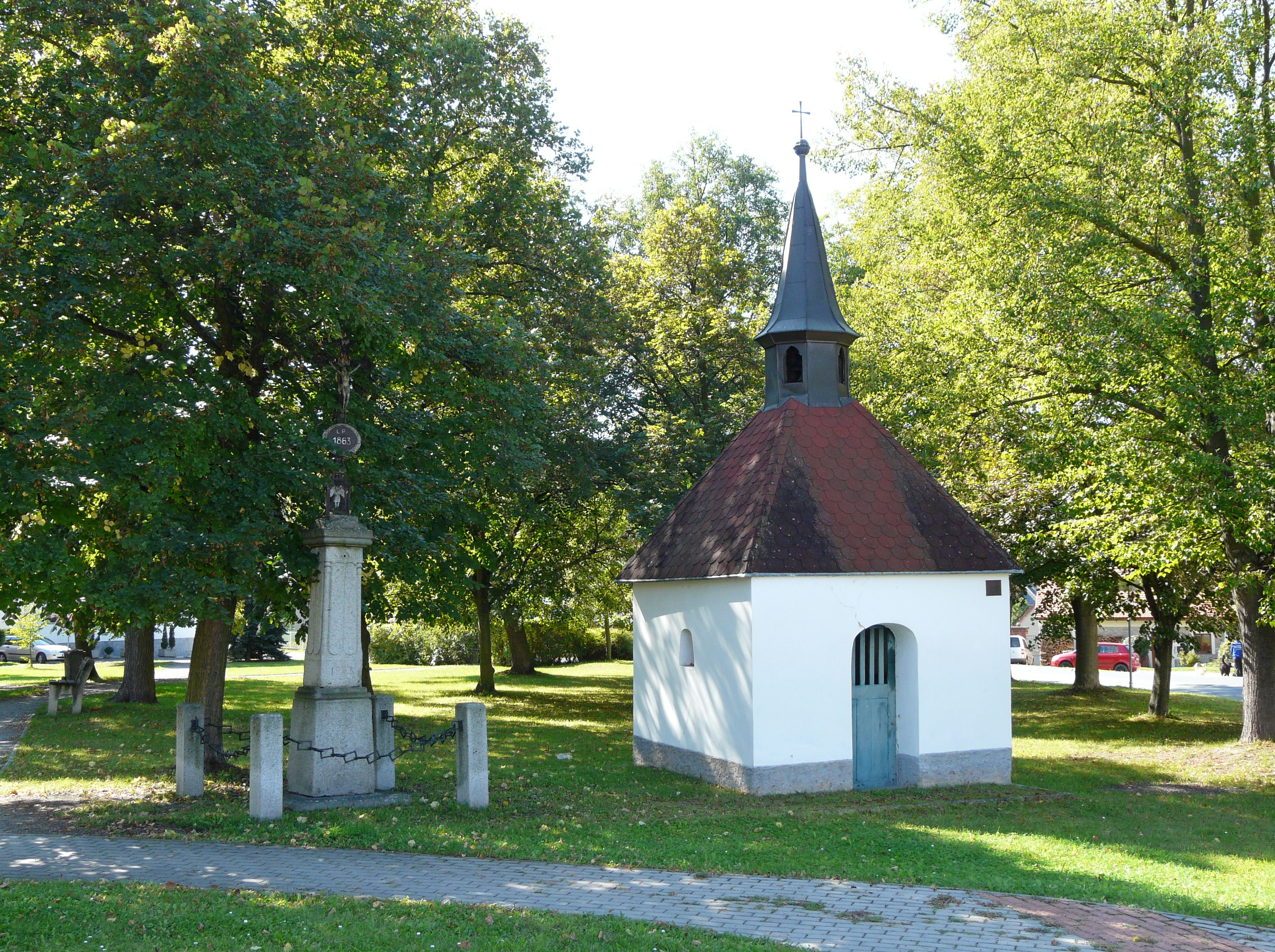
- Chapel of Saint Adalbert

- Flag Coat of arms

- Location in the Czech Republic
- Coordinates: 49°38′53″N 13°23′53″E
- Country: Czech Republic
- Region: Plzeň
- District: Plzeň-South
- First mentioned: 1115

Area
  - Total: 2.65 km^{2} (1.02 sq mi)
- Elevation: 355 m (1,165 ft)

Population (2026-01-01)
  - Total: 560
  - Density: 210/km^{2} (550/sq mi)
- Time zone: UTC+1 (CET)
  - Summer (DST): UTC+2 (CEST)
- Postal code: 332 09
- Website: www.obec-cizice.cz

Čižice is a municipality and village in Plzeň-South District in the Plzeň Region of the Czech Republic. It has about 600 inhabitants.

Čižice lies approximately 12 kilometres (7 mi) south of Plzeň and 89 km (55 mi) south-west of Prague.

== Demographics ==
Historical population
Year	Pop.	±%
1869	218	—
1880	260	+19.3%
1890	296	+13.8%
1900	315	+6.4%
1910	359	+14.0%
1921	322	−10.3%
1930	367	+14.0%
1950	422	+15.0%
1961	442	+4.7%
1970	438	−0.9%
1980	410	−6.4%
1991	413	+0.7%
2001	411	−0.5%
2011	531	+29.2%
2021	566	+6.6%
Source: Censuses
