= Vlčí =

- Municipality
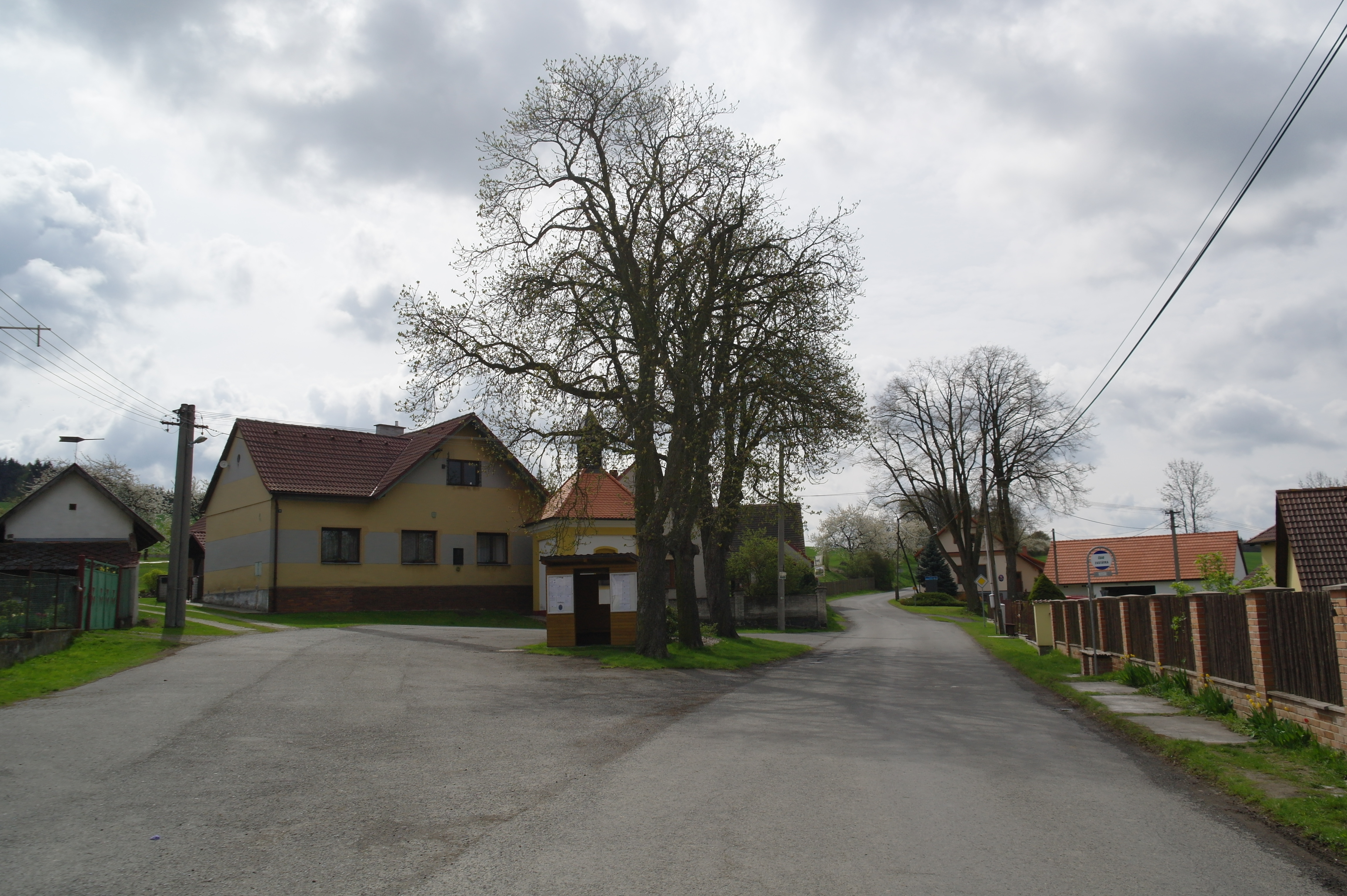
- Centre of Vlčí with a chapel

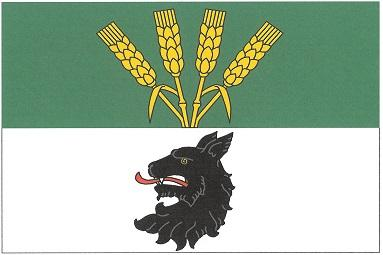
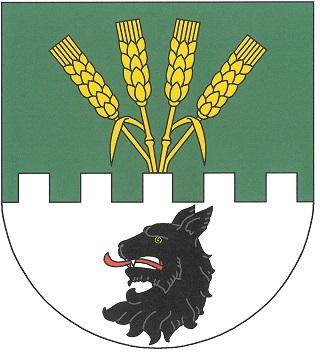
- Flag Coat of arms

- Location in the Czech Republic
- Coordinates: 49°30′43″N 13°21′37″E
- Country: Czech Republic
- Region: Plzeň
- District: Plzeň-South
- First mentioned: 1355

Area
  - Total: 3.98 km^{2} (1.54 sq mi)
- Elevation: 483 m (1,585 ft)

Population (2026-01-01)
  - Total: 81
  - Density: 20/km^{2} (53/sq mi)
- Time zone: UTC+1 (CET)
  - Summer (DST): UTC+2 (CEST)
- Postal code: 334 01
- Website: www.obec-vlci.cz

Vlčí is a municipality and village in Plzeň-South District in the Plzeň Region of the Czech Republic. It has about 80 inhabitants.

Vlčí lies approximately 26 kilometres (16 mi) south of Plzeň and 100 km (62 mi) south-west of Prague.

== Demographics ==
Historical population
Year	Pop.	±%
1869	317	—
1880	323	+1.9%
1890	288	−10.8%
1900	243	−15.6%
1910	269	+10.7%
1921	282	+4.8%
1930	267	−5.3%
1950	151	−43.4%
1961	170	+12.6%
1970	135	−20.6%
1980	118	−12.6%
1991	86	−27.1%
2001	63	−26.7%
2011	69	+9.5%
2021	73	+5.8%
Source: Censuses
