= Lišany =

Lišany may refer to places in the Czech Republic:

- Lišany (Louny District), a municipality and village in Ústí nad Labem Region
- Lišany (Rakovník District), a municipality and village in Central Bohemian Region
