= Smilovice (Rakovník District) =

- Municipality
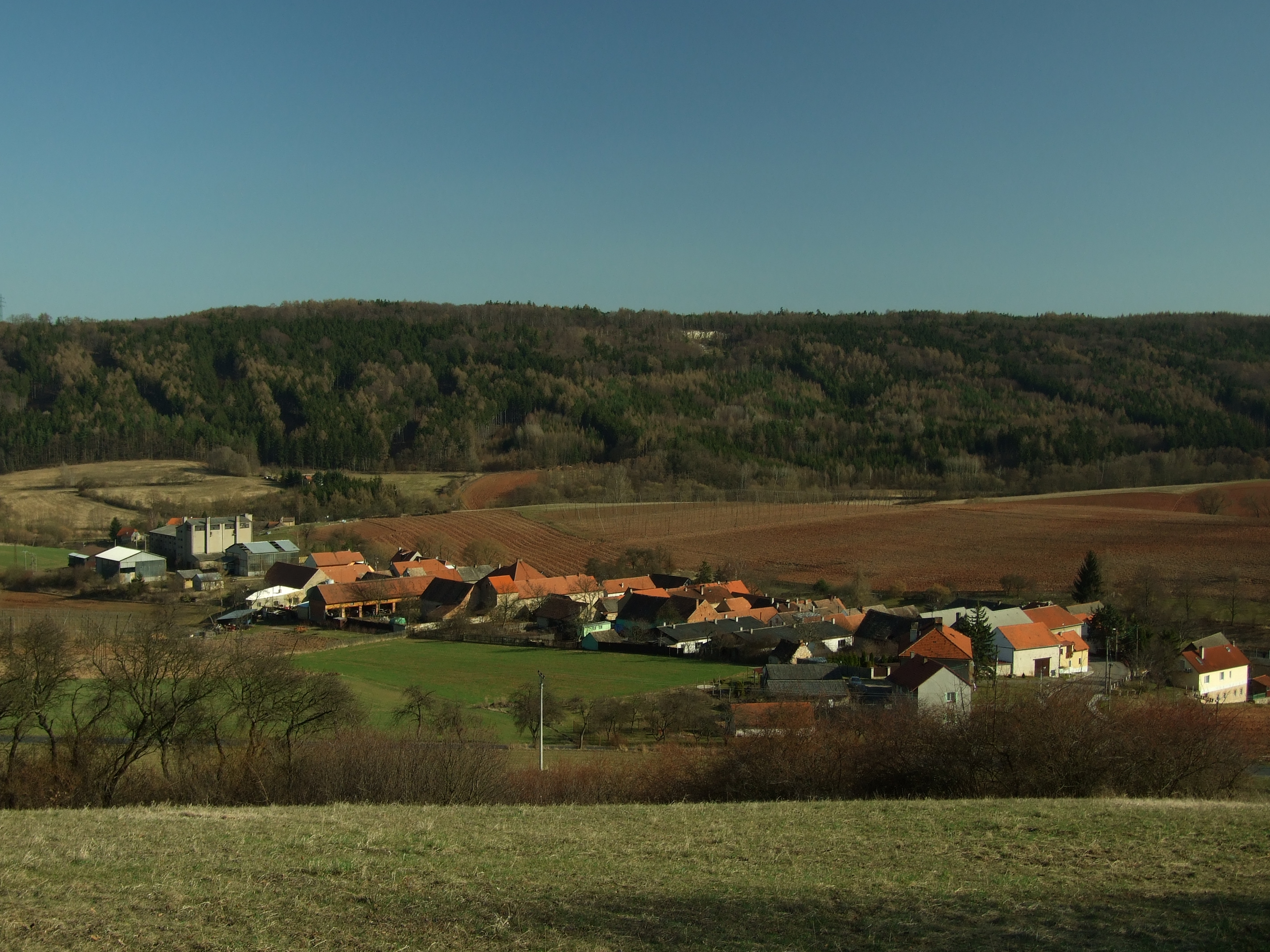
- View from the north

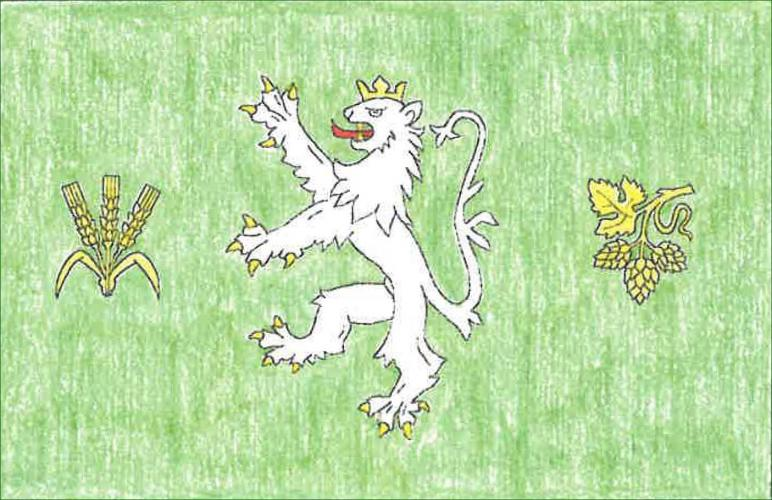
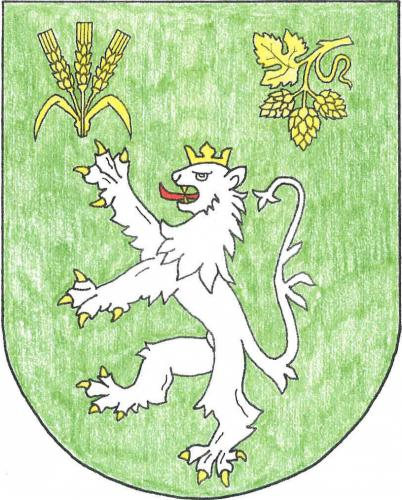
- Flag Coat of arms

- Location in the Czech Republic
- Coordinates: 50°14′49″N 13°48′28″E
- Country: Czech Republic
- Region: Central Bohemian
- District: Rakovník
- First mentioned: 1197

Area
  - Total: 1.68 km^{2} (0.65 sq mi)
- Elevation: 355 m (1,165 ft)

Population (2026-01-01)
  - Total: 89
  - Density: 53/km^{2} (140/sq mi)
- Time zone: UTC+1 (CET)
  - Summer (DST): UTC+2 (CEST)
- Postal code: 270 54
- Website: www.smilovice.eu

Smilovice is a municipality and village in Rakovník District in the Central Bohemian Region of the Czech Republic. It has about 90 inhabitants.

== Demographics ==
Historical population
Year	Pop.	±%
1869	202	—
1880	210	+4.0%
1890	208	−1.0%
1900	194	−6.7%
1910	178	−8.2%
1921	164	−7.9%
1930	162	−1.2%
1950	101	−37.7%
1961	85	−15.8%
1970	81	−4.7%
1980	78	−3.7%
1991	62	−20.5%
2001	57	−8.1%
2011	53	−7.0%
2021	81	+52.8%
Source: Censuses
