= Třeboc =

- Municipality
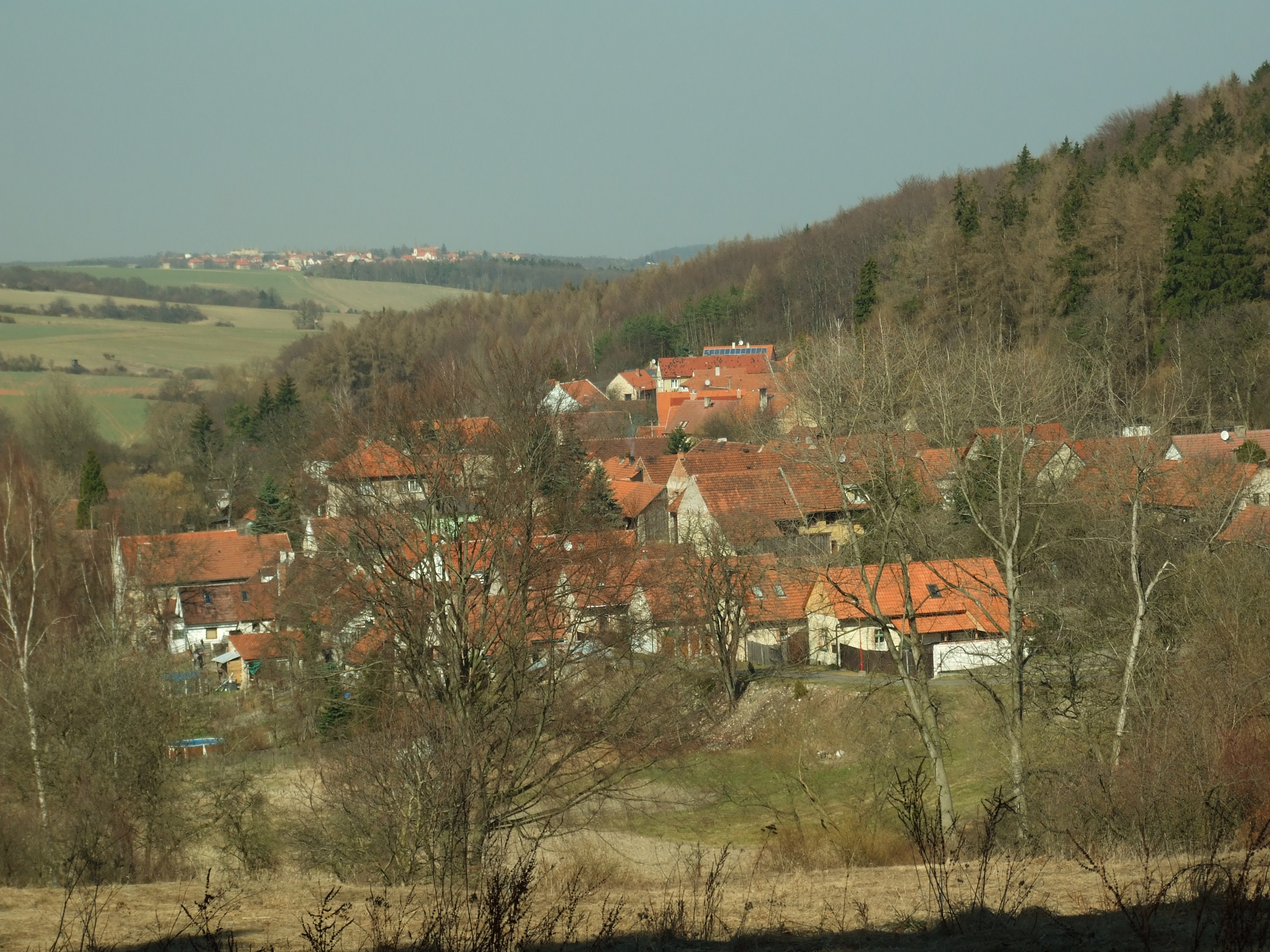
- View from the south

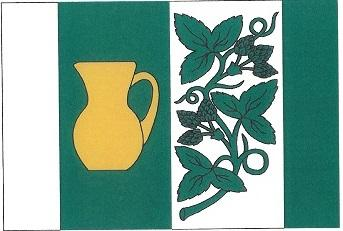
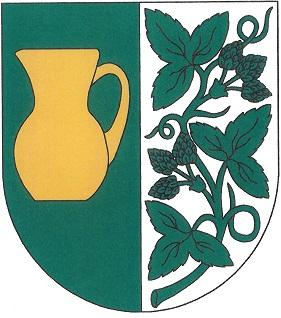
- Flag Coat of arms

- Location in the Czech Republic
- Coordinates: 50°12′52″N 13°45′10″E
- Country: Czech Republic
- Region: Central Bohemian
- District: Rakovník
- First mentioned: 1405

Area
  - Total: 9.51 km^{2} (3.67 sq mi)
- Elevation: 448 m (1,470 ft)

Population (2026-01-01)
  - Total: 161
  - Density: 16.9/km^{2} (43.8/sq mi)
- Time zone: UTC+1 (CET)
  - Summer (DST): UTC+2 (CEST)
- Postal code: 270 54
- Website: www.obec-treboc.cz

Třeboc is a municipality and village in Rakovník District in the Central Bohemian Region of the Czech Republic. It has about 200 inhabitants.

== Demographics ==
Historical population
Year	Pop.	±%
1869	505	—
1880	530	+5.0%
1890	476	−10.2%
1900	501	+5.3%
1910	534	+6.6%
1921	527	−1.3%
1930	476	−9.7%
1950	349	−26.7%
1961	280	−19.8%
1970	237	−15.4%
1980	186	−21.5%
1991	150	−19.4%
2001	128	−14.7%
2011	133	+3.9%
2021	164	+23.3%
Source: Censuses
