= Zavidov =

- Municipality
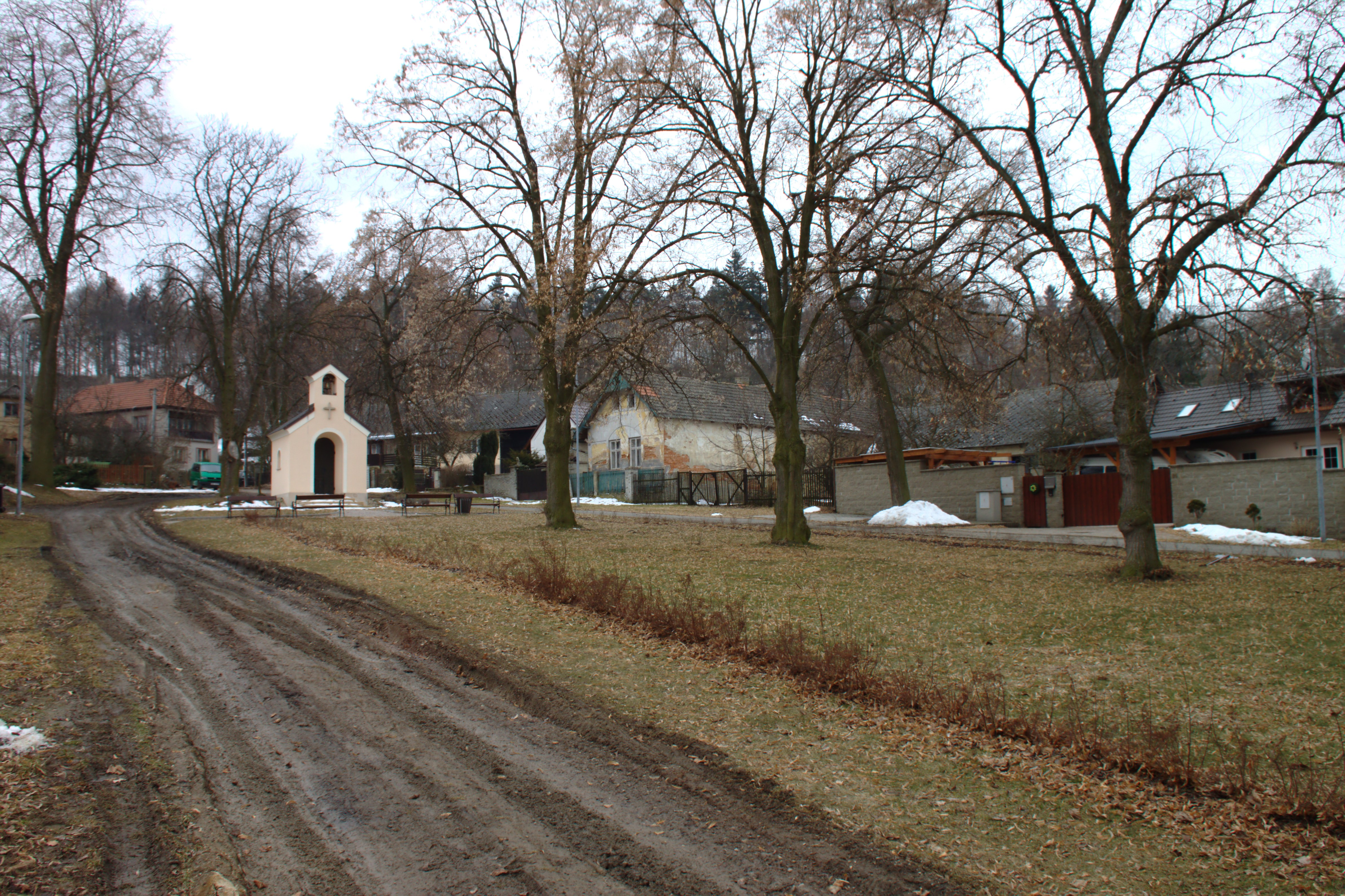
- Centre of Zavidov

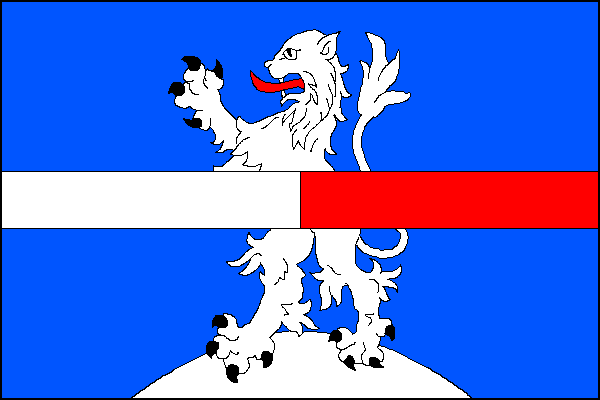
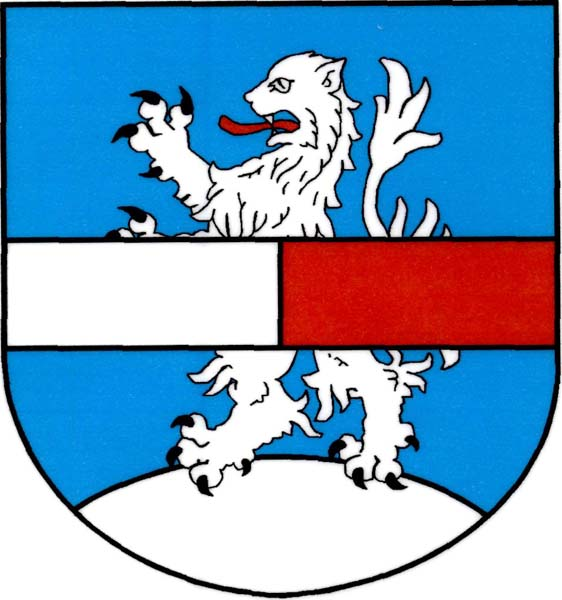
- Flag Coat of arms

- Location in the Czech Republic
- Coordinates: 50°3′24″N 13°37′13″E
- Country: Czech Republic
- Region: Central Bohemian
- District: Rakovník
- First mentioned: 1360

Area
  - Total: 3.79 km^{2} (1.46 sq mi)
- Elevation: 461 m (1,512 ft)

Population (2026-01-01)
  - Total: 372
  - Density: 98.2/km^{2} (254/sq mi)
- Time zone: UTC+1 (CET)
  - Summer (DST): UTC+2 (CEST)
- Postal code: 270 35
- Website: www.zavidov.cz

Zavidov is a municipality and village in Rakovník District in the Central Bohemian Region of the Czech Republic. It has about 400 inhabitants.

== Demographics ==
Historical population
Year	Pop.	±%
1869	402	—
1880	369	−8.2%
1890	349	−5.4%
1900	332	−4.9%
1910	363	+9.3%
1921	351	−3.3%
1930	383	+9.1%
1950	316	−17.5%
1961	324	+2.5%
1970	287	−11.4%
1980	314	+9.4%
1991	257	−18.2%
2001	294	+14.4%
2011	321	+9.2%
2021	356	+10.9%
Source: Censuses
