= Srbeč =

- Municipality
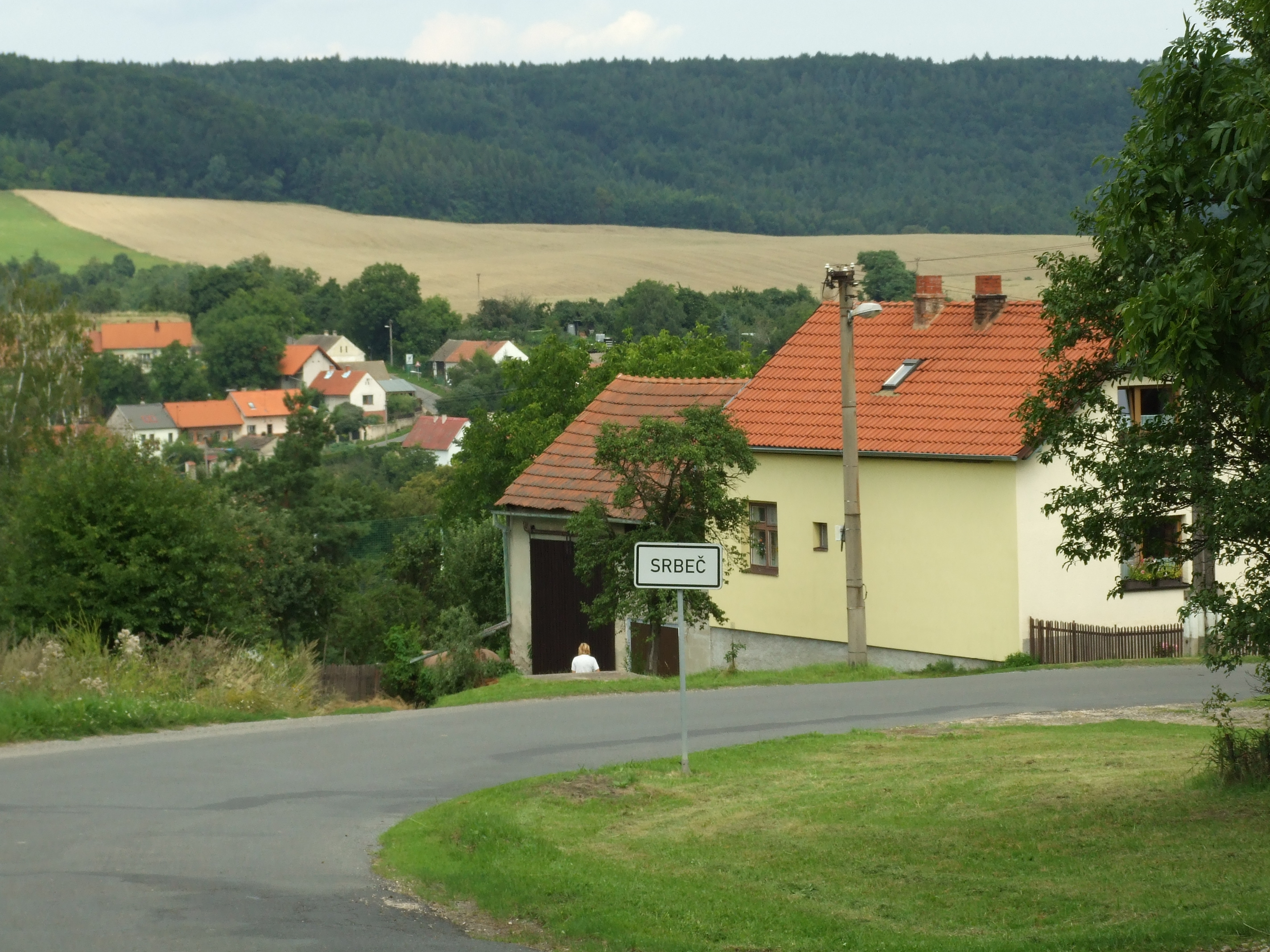
- View from the south

- Location in the Czech Republic
- Coordinates: 50°13′29″N 13°53′0″E
- Country: Czech Republic
- Region: Central Bohemian
- District: Rakovník
- First mentioned: 1227

Area
  - Total: 6.23 km^{2} (2.41 sq mi)
- Elevation: 324 m (1,063 ft)

Population (2026-01-01)
  - Total: 317
  - Density: 50.9/km^{2} (132/sq mi)
- Time zone: UTC+1 (CET)
  - Summer (DST): UTC+2 (CEST)
- Postal code: 270 65
- Website: www.srbec.cz

Srbeč is a municipality and village in Rakovník District in the Central Bohemian Region of the Czech Republic. It has about 300 inhabitants.

== Demographics ==
Historical population
Year	Pop.	±%
1869	642	—
1880	714	+11.2%
1890	617	−13.6%
1900	616	−0.2%
1910	568	−7.8%
1921	540	−4.9%
1930	550	+1.9%
1950	457	−16.9%
1961	442	−3.3%
1970	369	−16.5%
1980	313	−15.2%
1991	294	−6.1%
2001	292	−0.7%
2011	299	+2.4%
2021	314	+5.0%
Source: Censuses
