= Václavy =

- Municipality
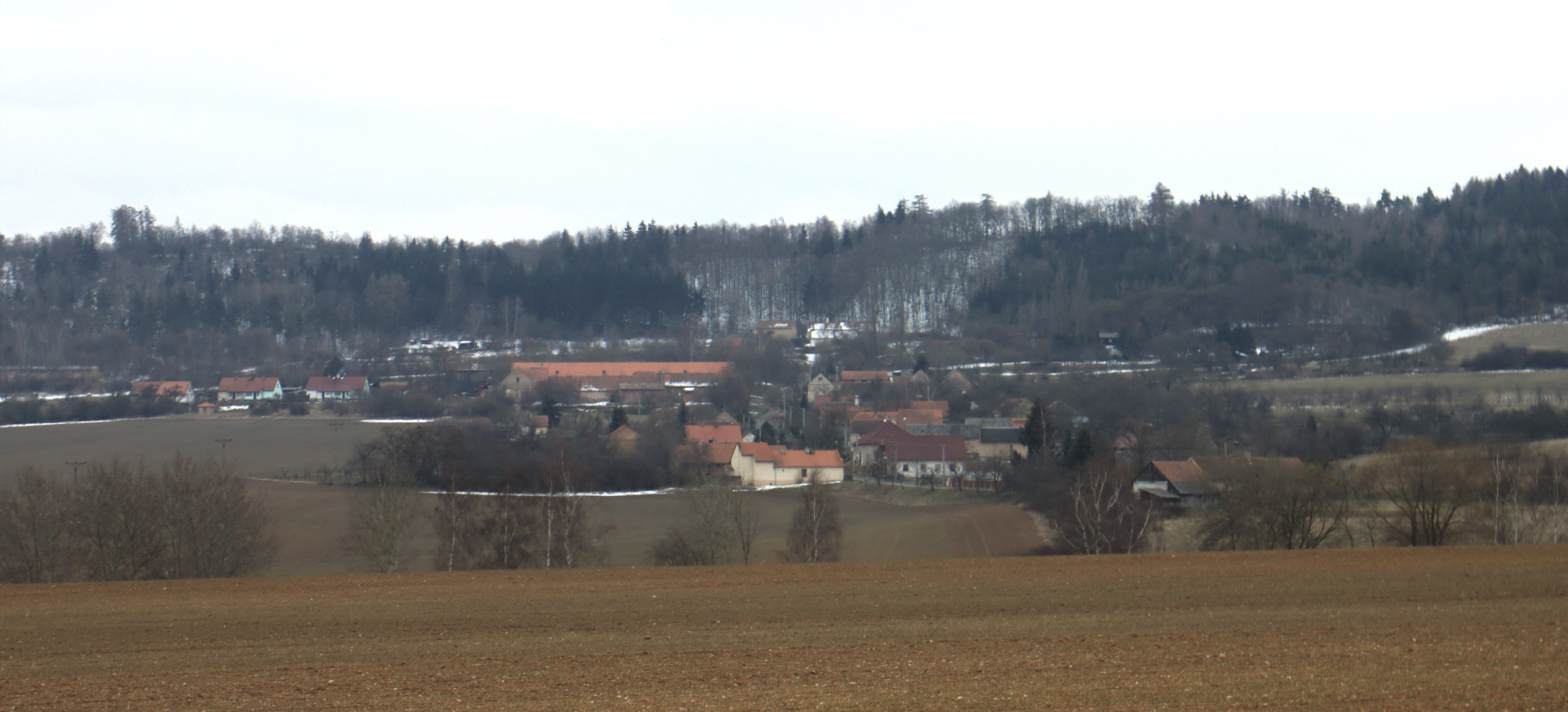
- General view

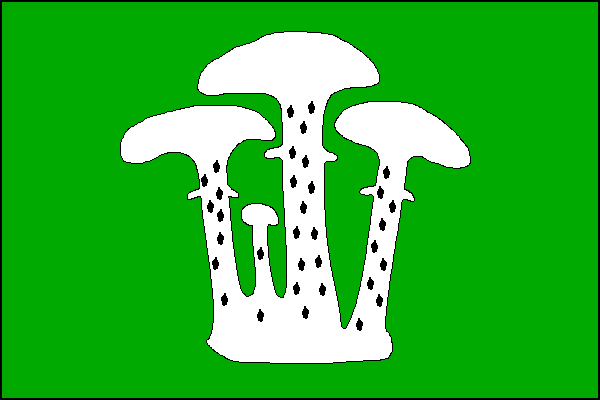
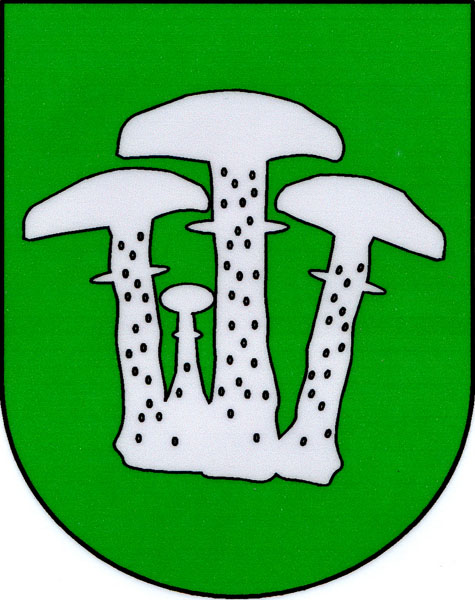
- Flag Coat of arms

- Location in the Czech Republic
- Coordinates: 50°3′50″N 13°35′40″E
- Country: Czech Republic
- Region: Central Bohemian
- District: Rakovník
- First mentioned: 1453

Area
  - Total: 5.30 km^{2} (2.05 sq mi)
- Elevation: 435 m (1,427 ft)

Population (2026-01-01)
  - Total: 60
  - Density: 11/km^{2} (29/sq mi)
- Time zone: UTC+1 (CET)
  - Summer (DST): UTC+2 (CEST)
- Postal code: 270 35
- Website: www.vaclavy.cz

Václavy is a municipality and village in Rakovník District in the Central Bohemian Region of the Czech Republic. It has about 60 inhabitants.

== Demographics ==
Historical population
Year	Pop.	±%
1869	220	—
1880	197	−10.5%
1890	181	−8.1%
1900	184	+1.7%
1910	175	−4.9%
1921	203	+16.0%
1930	190	−6.4%
1950	91	−52.1%
1961	93	+2.2%
1970	75	−19.4%
1980	72	−4.0%
1991	60	−16.7%
2001	59	−1.7%
2011	57	−3.4%
2021	70	+22.8%
Source: Censuses
