= Velká Chmelištná =

- Municipality
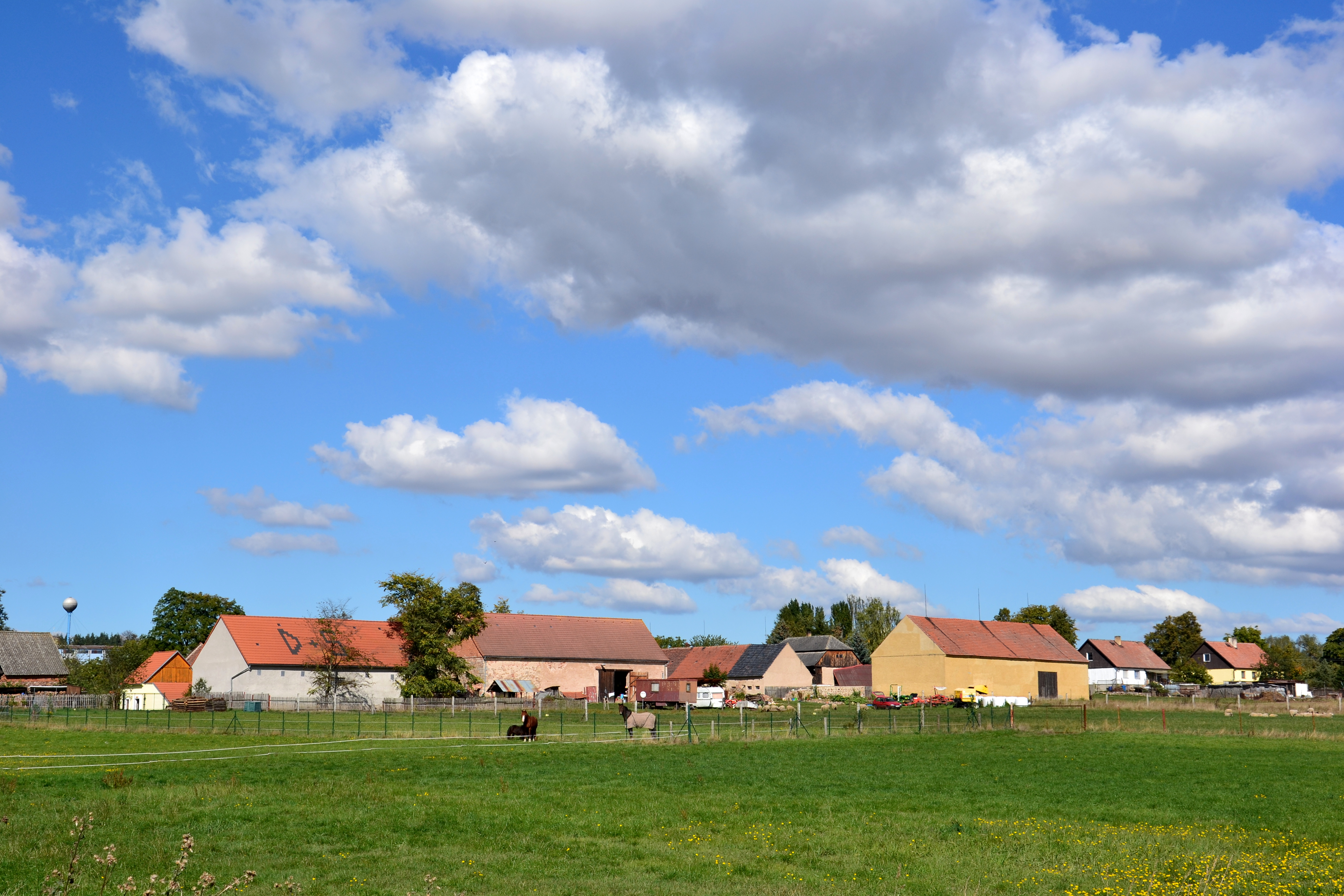
- View from the south

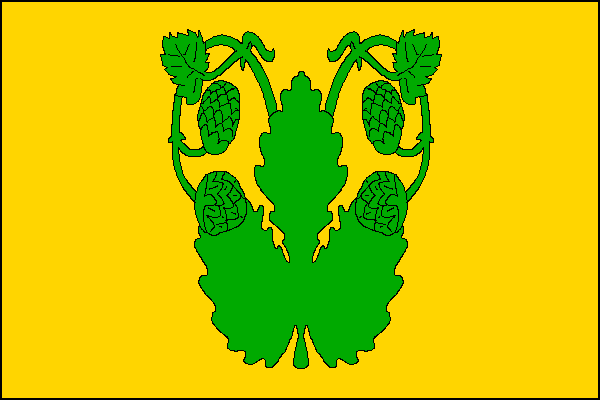
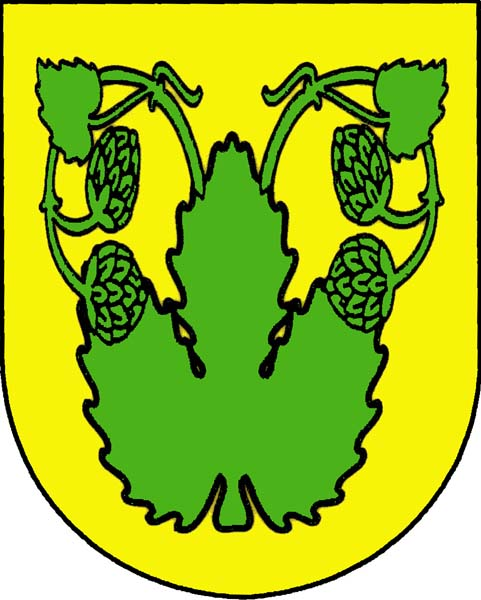
- Flag Coat of arms

- Location in the Czech Republic
- Coordinates: 50°3′49″N 13°33′6″E
- Country: Czech Republic
- Region: Central Bohemian
- District: Rakovník
- First mentioned: 1352

Area
  - Total: 8.35 km^{2} (3.22 sq mi)
- Elevation: 517 m (1,696 ft)

Population (2026-01-01)
  - Total: 54
  - Density: 6.5/km^{2} (17/sq mi)
- Time zone: UTC+1 (CET)
  - Summer (DST): UTC+2 (CEST)
- Postal code: 270 34
- Website: www.velkachmelistna.cz

Velká Chmelištná is a municipality and village in Rakovník District in the Central Bohemian Region of the Czech Republic. It has about 50 inhabitants.

== Administrative division ==
Velká Chmelištná consists of two municipal parts (in brackets population according to the 2021 census):

- Velká Chmelištná (55)
- Hůrky (0)

== Demographics ==
Historical population
| Year | Pop. | ±% |
|---|---|---|
| 1869 | 331 | — |
| 1880 | 381 | +15.1% |
| 1890 | 364 | −4.5% |
| 1900 | 345 | −5.2% |
| 1910 | 310 | −10.1% |
| 1921 | 307 | −1.0% |
| 1930 | 262 | −14.7% |
| 1950 | 167 | −36.3% |
| 1961 | 165 | −1.2% |
| 1970 | 92 | −44.2% |
| 1980 | 87 | −5.4% |
| 1991 | 76 | −12.6% |
| 2001 | 58 | −23.7% |
| 2011 | 52 | −10.3% |
| 2021 | 55 | +5.8% |
Source: Censuses
