= Kozojedy (Rakovník District) =

- Municipality
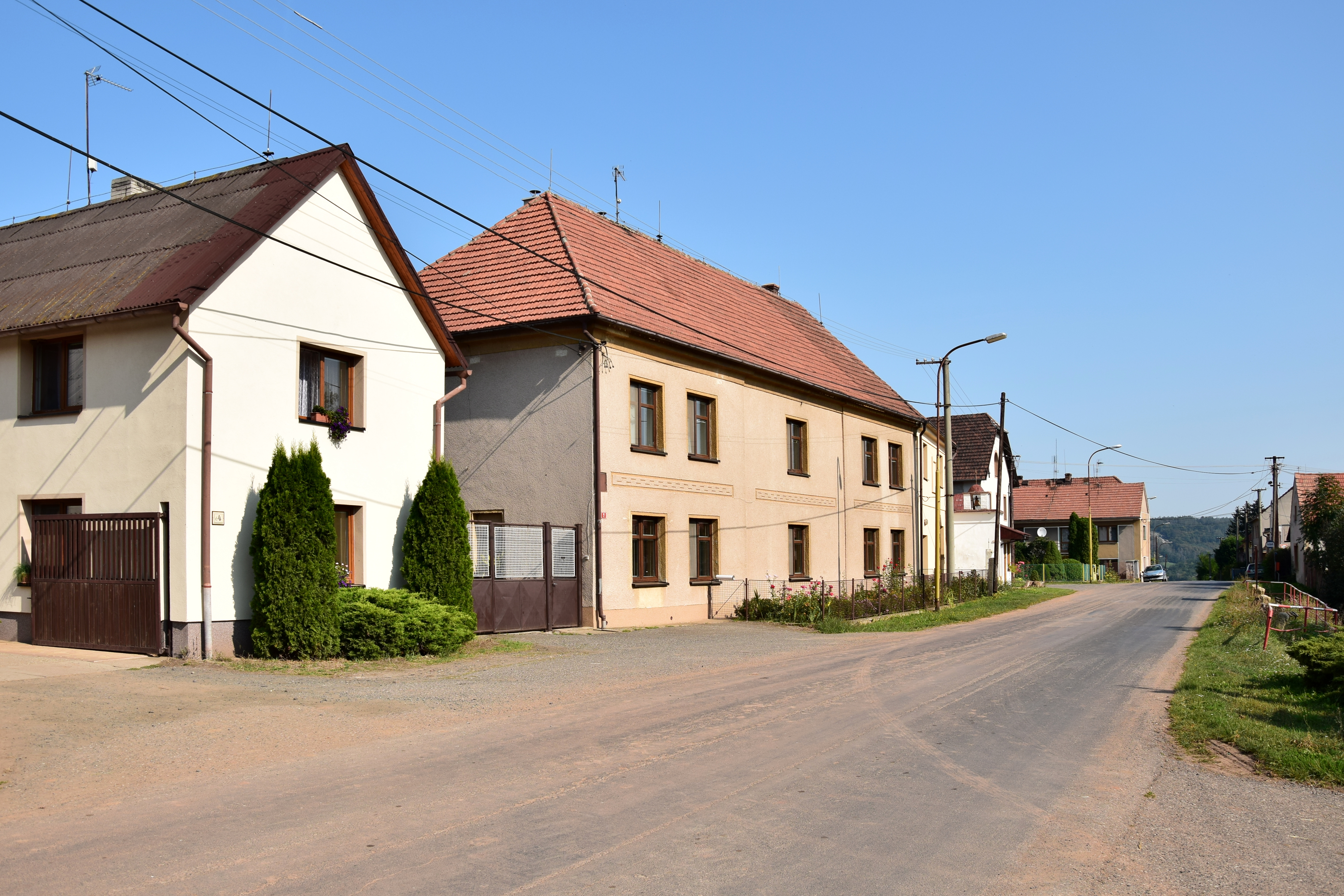
- Main street

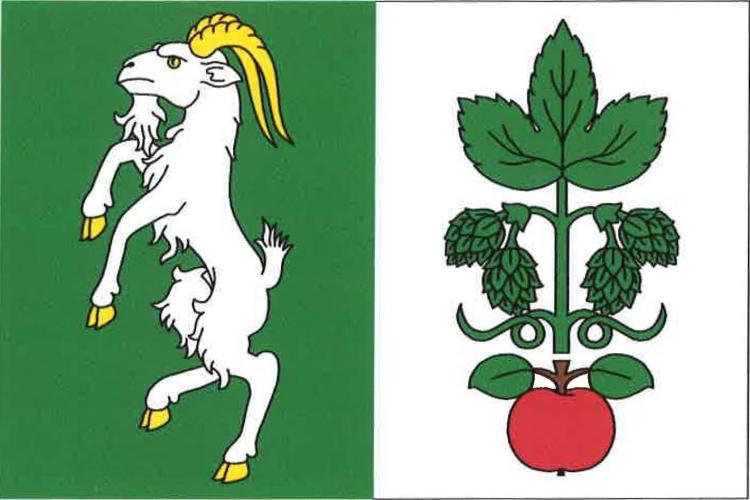
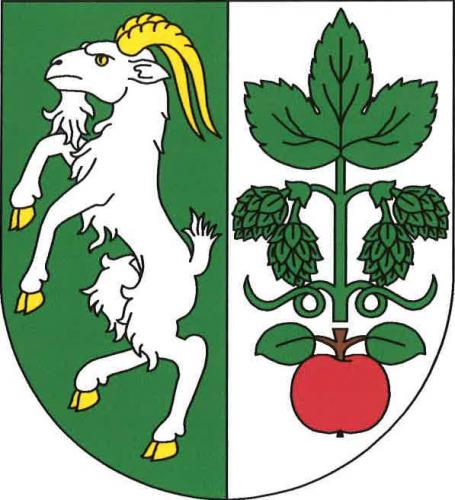
- Flag Coat of arms

- Location in the Czech Republic
- Coordinates: 50°15′19″N 13°48′56″E
- Country: Czech Republic
- Region: Central Bohemian
- District: Rakovník
- First mentioned: 1316

Area
  - Total: 7.19 km^{2} (2.78 sq mi)
- Elevation: 365 m (1,198 ft)

Population (2026-01-01)
  - Total: 92
  - Density: 13/km^{2} (33/sq mi)
- Time zone: UTC+1 (CET)
  - Summer (DST): UTC+2 (CEST)
- Postal code: 270 54
- Website: www.obec-kozojedy.cz

Kozojedy is a municipality and village in Rakovník District in the Central Bohemian Region of the Czech Republic. It has about 90 inhabitants.

== Demographics ==
Historical population
Year	Pop.	±%
1869	282	—
1880	280	−0.7%
1890	313	+11.8%
1900	326	+4.2%
1910	296	−9.2%
1921	247	−16.6%
1930	272	+10.1%
1950	192	−29.4%
1961	161	−16.1%
1970	128	−20.5%
1980	118	−7.8%
1991	99	−16.1%
2001	92	−7.1%
2011	90	−2.2%
2021	96	+6.7%
Source: Censuses
