= Šípy =

- Municipality
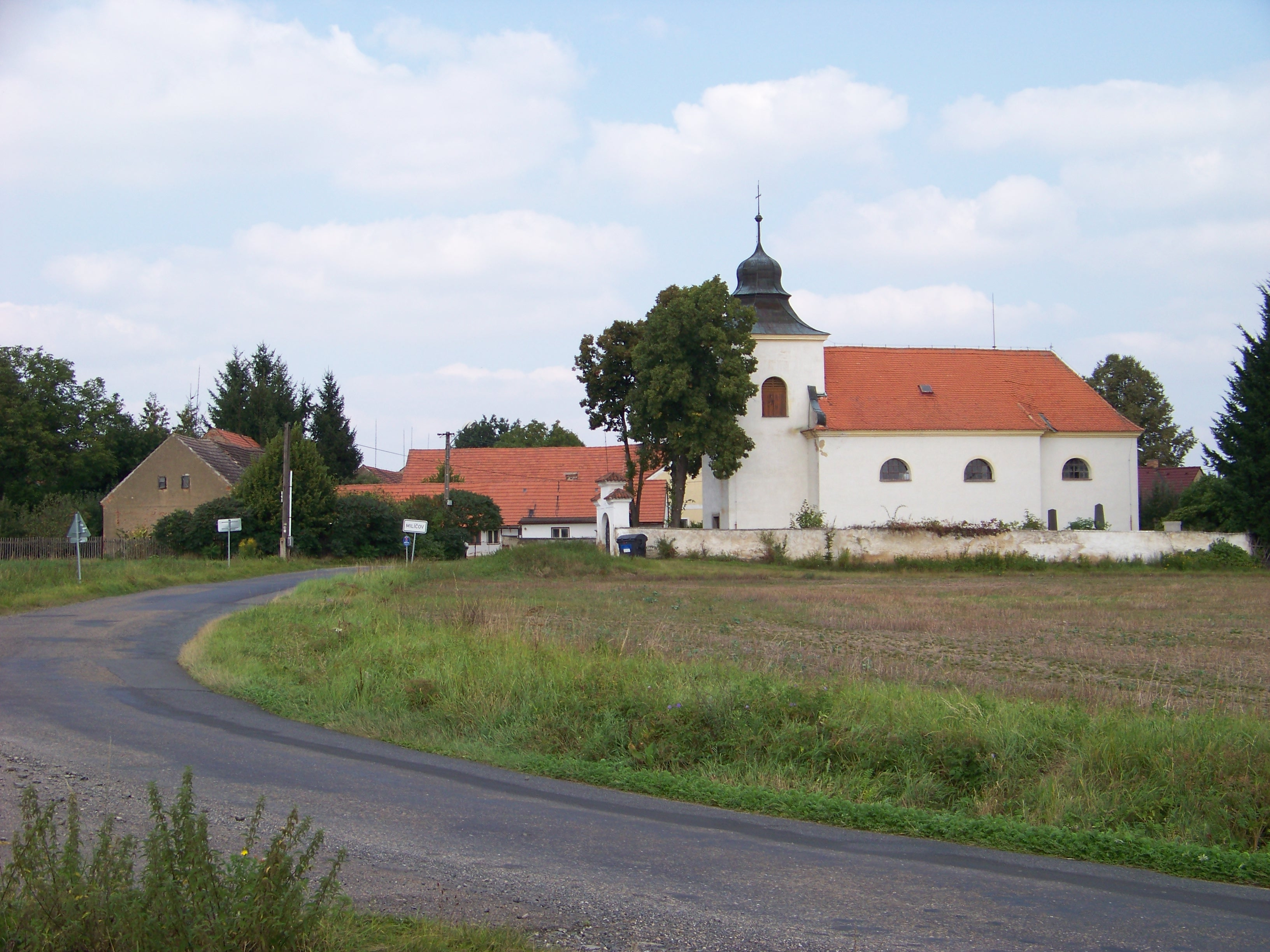
- Milíčov, a part of Šípy

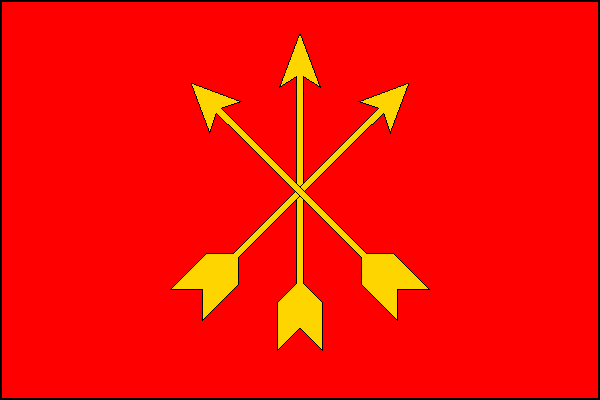
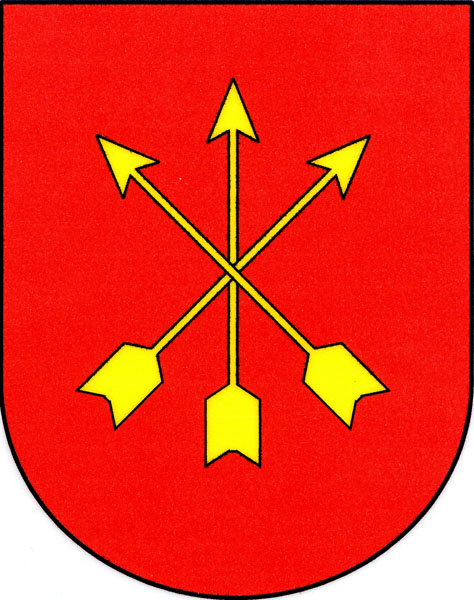
- Flag Coat of arms

- Location in the Czech Republic
- Coordinates: 50°0′52″N 13°36′59″E
- Country: Czech Republic
- Region: Central Bohemian
- District: Rakovník
- First mentioned: 1410

Area
  - Total: 11.63 km^{2} (4.49 sq mi)
- Elevation: 432 m (1,417 ft)

Population (2026-01-01)
  - Total: 154
  - Density: 13.2/km^{2} (34.3/sq mi)
- Time zone: UTC+1 (CET)
  - Summer (DST): UTC+2 (CEST)
- Postal code: 270 34
- Website: www.obec-sipy.cz

Šípy is a municipality and village in Rakovník District in the Central Bohemian Region of the Czech Republic. It has about 200 inhabitants.

== Administrative division ==
Šípy consists of three municipal parts (in brackets population according to the 2021 census):

- Šípy (86)
- Bělbožice (40)
- Milíčov (30)

== Demographics ==
Historical population
Year	Pop.	±%
1869	535	—
1880	471	−12.0%
1890	486	+3.2%
1900	468	−3.7%
1910	455	−2.8%
1921	459	+0.9%
1930	454	−1.1%
1950	314	−30.8%
1961	316	+0.6%
1970	252	−20.3%
1980	203	−19.4%
1991	219	+7.9%
2001	161	−26.5%
2011	150	−6.8%
2021	156	+4.0%
Source: Censuses
