= Přerubenice =

- Municipality
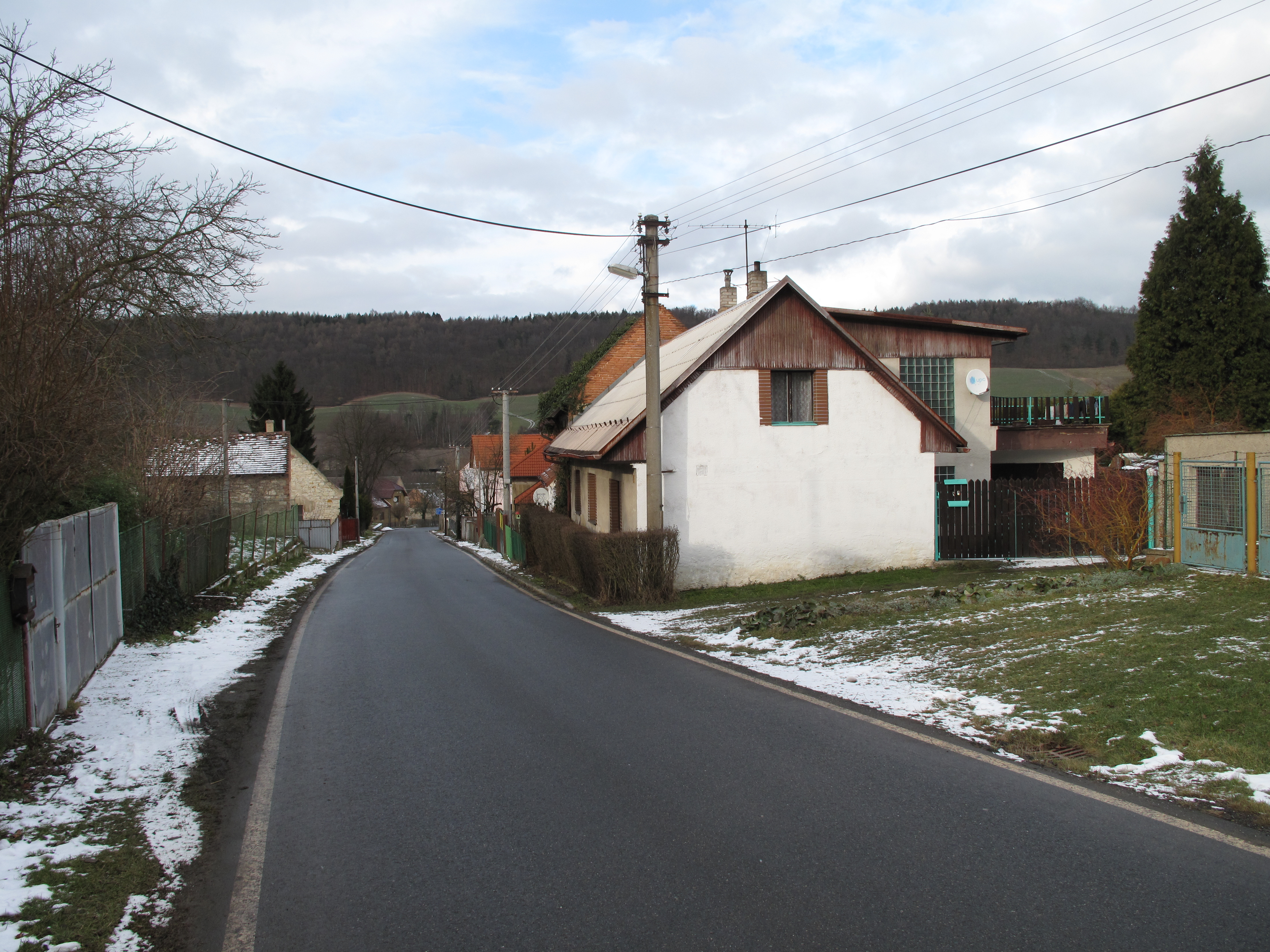
- A street in Přerubenice

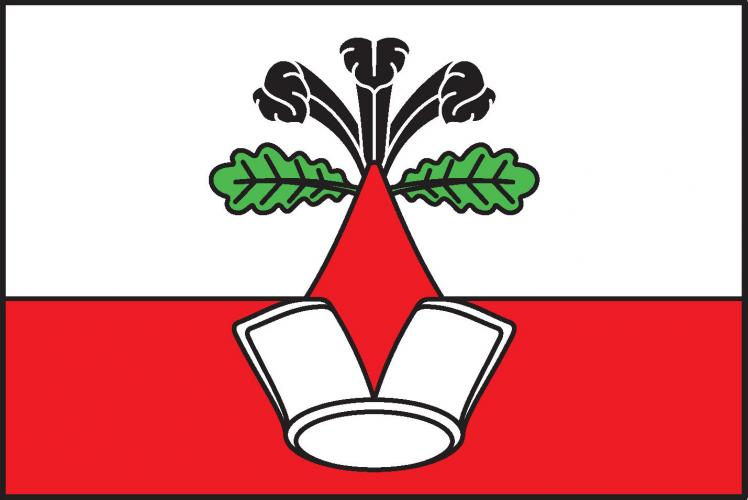
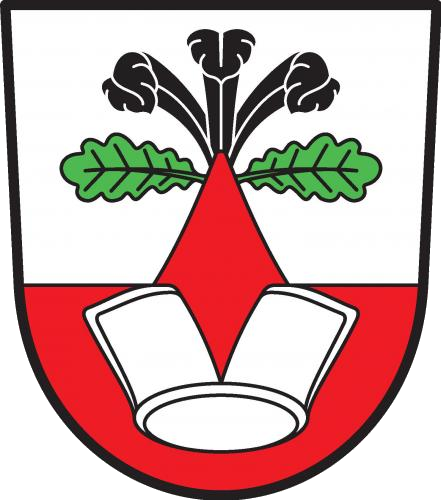
- Flag Coat of arms

- Location in the Czech Republic
- Coordinates: 50°13′2″N 13°50′28″E
- Country: Czech Republic
- Region: Central Bohemian
- District: Rakovník
- First mentioned: 1318

Area
  - Total: 2.09 km^{2} (0.81 sq mi)
- Elevation: 369 m (1,211 ft)

Population (2026-01-01)
  - Total: 88
  - Density: 42/km^{2} (110/sq mi)
- Time zone: UTC+1 (CET)
  - Summer (DST): UTC+2 (CEST)
- Postal code: 270 54
- Website: www.prerubenice.cz

Přerubenice is a municipality and village in Rakovník District in the Central Bohemian Region of the Czech Republic. It has about 90 inhabitants.

== Administrative division ==
Přerubenice consists of two municipal parts (in brackets population according to the 2021 census):

- Přerubenice (69)
- Dučice (10)

== Demographics ==
Historical population
Year	Pop.	±%
1869	153	—
1880	170	+11.1%
1890	181	+6.5%
1900	175	−3.3%
1910	174	−0.6%
1921	171	−1.7%
1930	190	+11.1%
1950	130	−31.6%
1961	127	−2.3%
1970	101	−20.5%
1980	63	−37.6%
1991	44	−30.2%
2001	68	+54.5%
2011	68	+0.0%
2021	79	+16.2%
Source: Censuses
