= Karlova Ves (Rakovník District) =

- Municipality
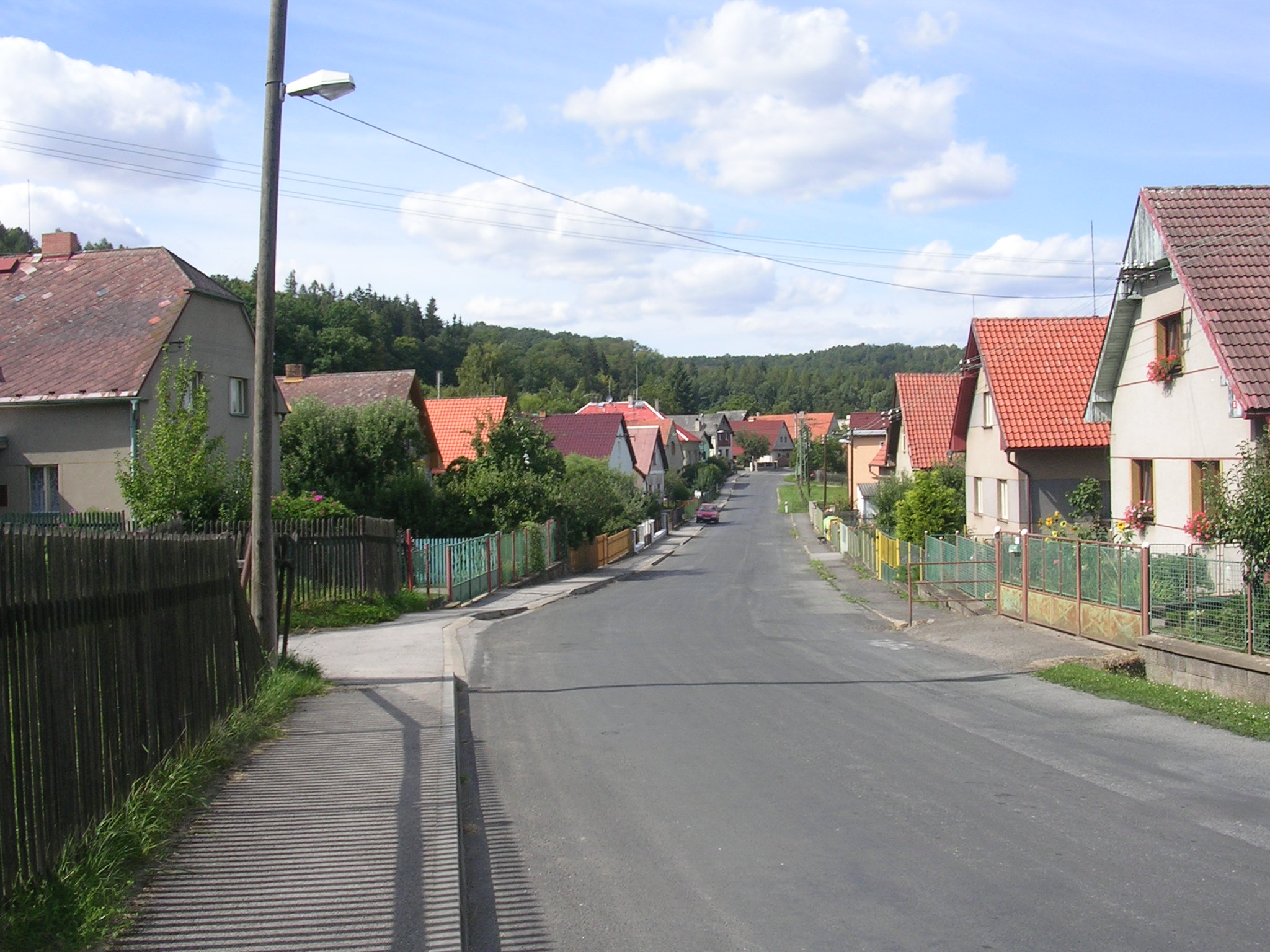
- Main street

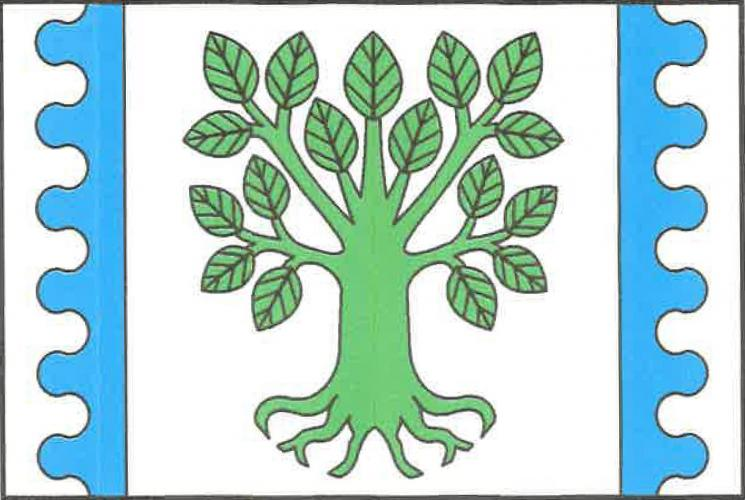
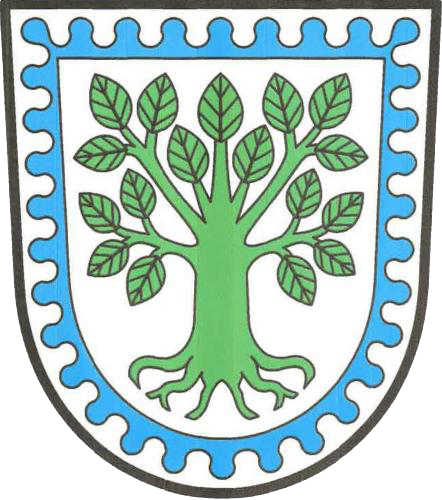
- Flag Coat of arms

- Location in the Czech Republic
- Coordinates: 49°59′15″N 13°51′45″E
- Country: Czech Republic
- Region: Central Bohemian
- District: Rakovník
- Founded: 1828

Area
  - Total: 10.42 km^{2} (4.02 sq mi)
- Elevation: 400 m (1,300 ft)

Population (2026-01-01)
  - Total: 120
  - Density: 12/km^{2} (30/sq mi)
- Time zone: UTC+1 (CET)
  - Summer (DST): UTC+2 (CEST)
- Postal code: 270 23
- Website: www.karlovaves.cz

Karlova Ves is a municipality and village in Rakovník District in the Central Bohemian Region of the Czech Republic. It has about 100 inhabitants.

== Demographics ==
Historical population
Year	Pop.	±%
1869	227	—
1880	215	−5.3%
1890	208	−3.3%
1900	203	−2.4%
1910	185	−8.9%
1921	194	+4.9%
1930	193	−0.5%
1950	169	−12.4%
1961	192	+13.6%
1970	154	−19.8%
1980	144	−6.5%
1991	126	−12.5%
2001	113	−10.3%
2011	128	+13.3%
2021	129	+0.8%
Source: Censuses
