= Panoší Újezd =

- Municipality
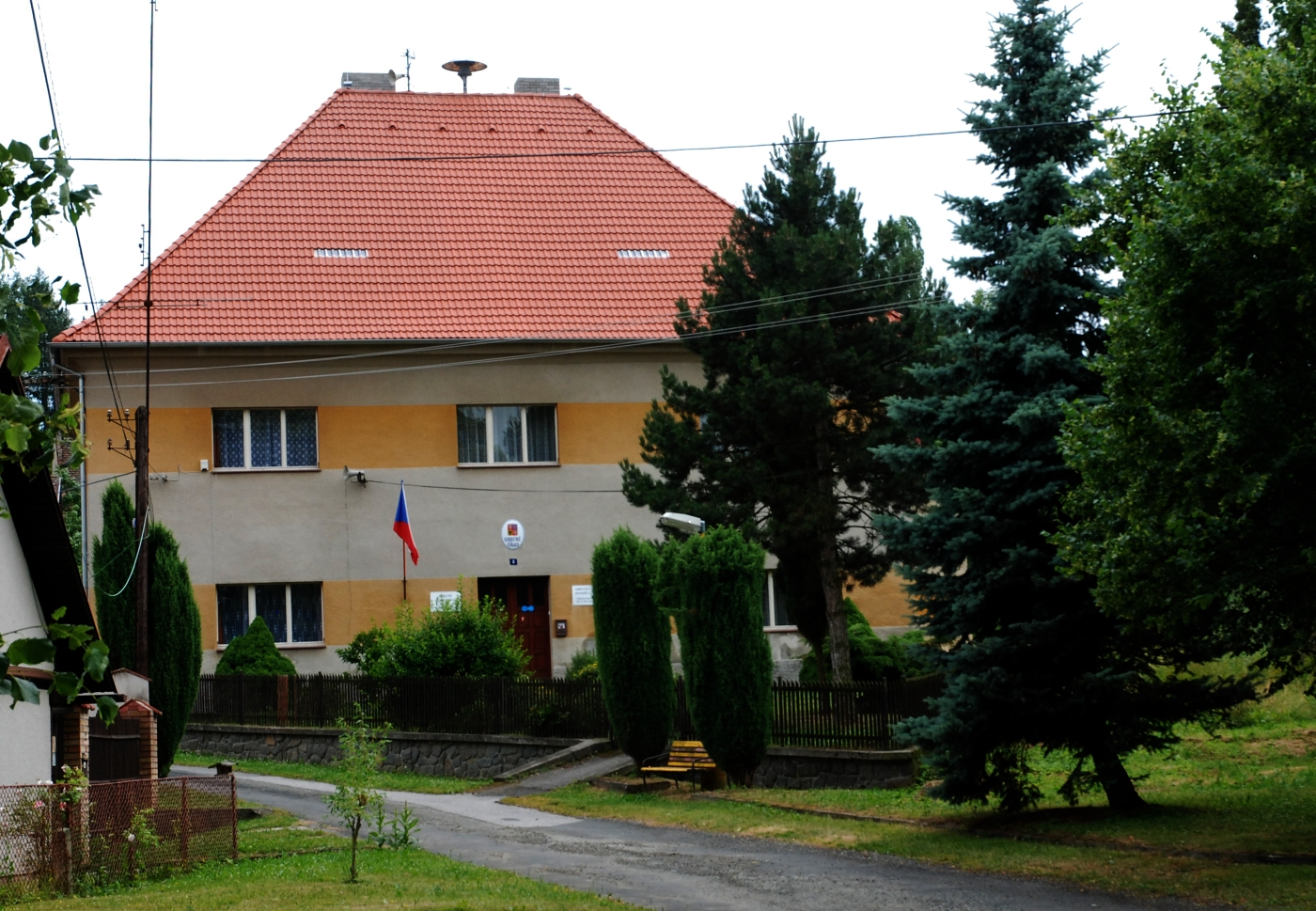
- Municipal office

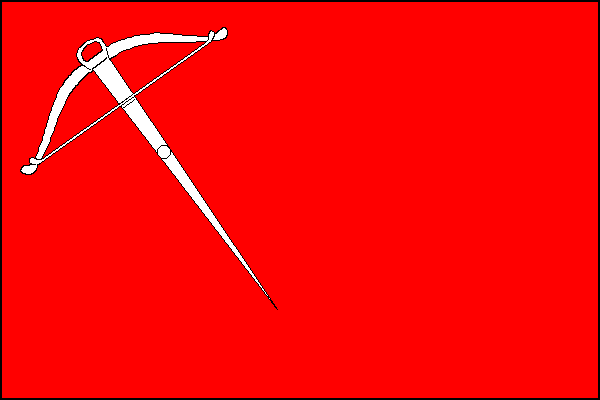
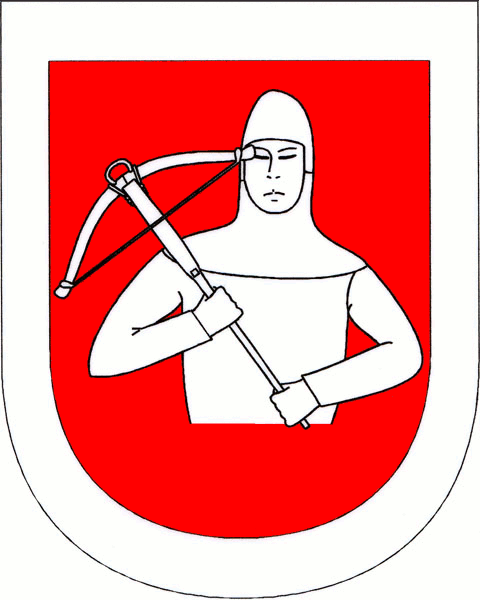
- Flag Coat of arms

- Location in the Czech Republic
- Coordinates: 50°2′10″N 13°43′0″E
- Country: Czech Republic
- Region: Central Bohemian
- District: Rakovník
- First mentioned: 1352

Area
  - Total: 7.50 km^{2} (2.90 sq mi)
- Elevation: 400 m (1,300 ft)

Population (2026-01-01)
  - Total: 274
  - Density: 36.5/km^{2} (94.6/sq mi)
- Time zone: UTC+1 (CET)
  - Summer (DST): UTC+2 (CEST)
- Postal code: 270 21
- Website: www.panosi-ujezd.cz

Panoší Újezd is a municipality and village in Rakovník District in the Central Bohemian Region of the Czech Republic. It has about 300 inhabitants.

== Demographics ==
Historical population
Year	Pop.	±%
1869	540	—
1880	551	+2.0%
1890	505	−8.3%
1900	513	+1.6%
1910	525	+2.3%
1921	514	−2.1%
1930	469	−8.8%
1950	336	−28.4%
1961	344	+2.4%
1970	289	−16.0%
1980	288	−0.3%
1991	249	−13.5%
2001	261	+4.8%
2011	293	+12.3%
2021	273	−6.8%
Source: Censuses
