= Pustověty =

- Municipality
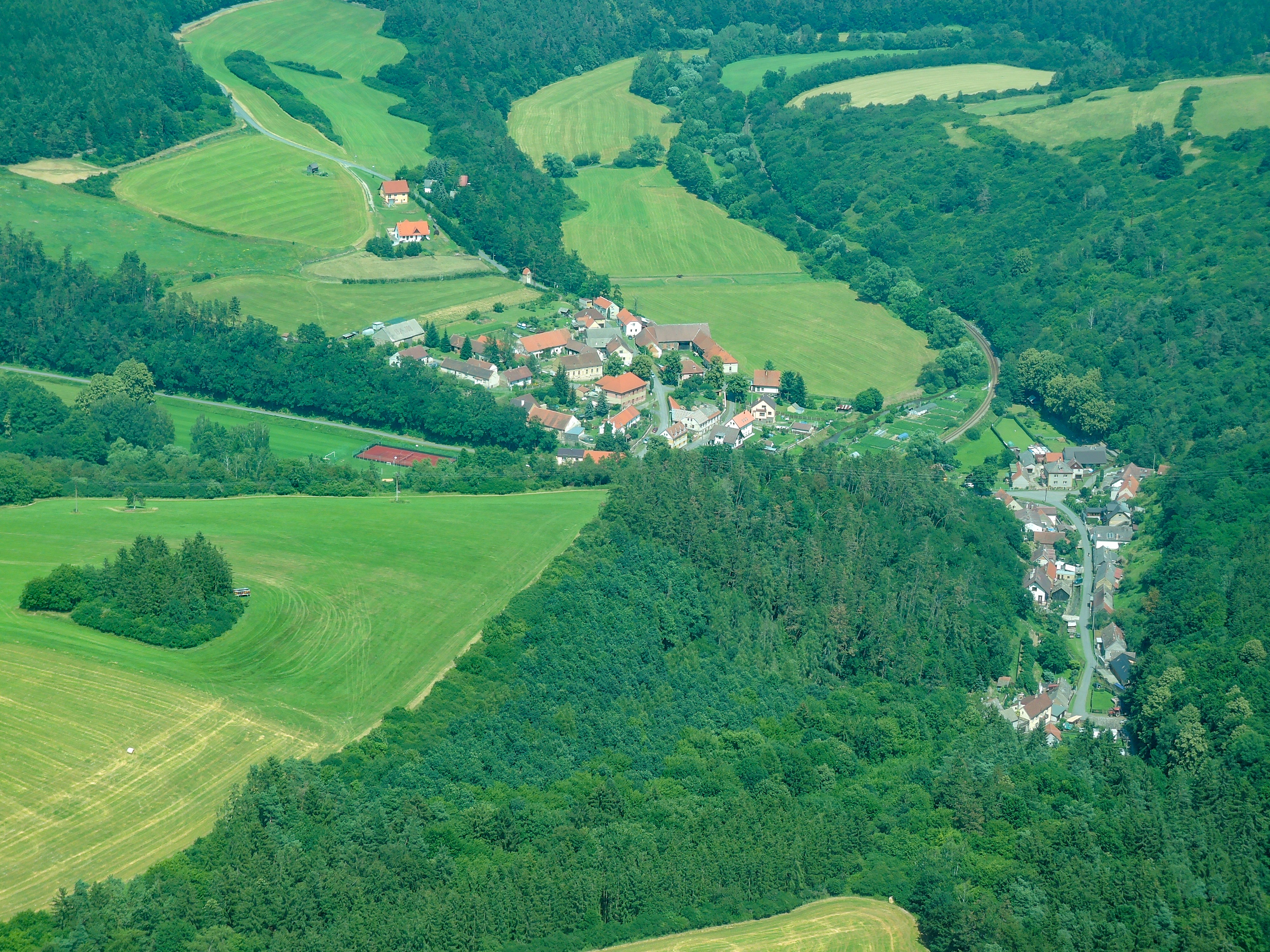
- Aerial view

- Location in the Czech Republic
- Coordinates: 50°3′20″N 13°48′51″E
- Country: Czech Republic
- Region: Central Bohemian
- District: Rakovník
- Founded: 1378

Area
  - Total: 14.64 km^{2} (5.65 sq mi)
- Elevation: 300 m (980 ft)

Population (2026-01-01)
  - Total: 116
  - Density: 7.92/km^{2} (20.5/sq mi)
- Time zone: UTC+1 (CET)
  - Summer (DST): UTC+2 (CEST)
- Postal code: 270 23
- Website: www.pustovety.cz

Pustověty is a municipality and village in Rakovník District in the Central Bohemian Region of the Czech Republic. It has about 100 inhabitants.

== History ==
Pustověty was founded in 1378, when the manor house was built.

== Demographics ==
Historical population
Year	Pop.	±%
1869	272	—
1880	294	+8.1%
1890	262	−10.9%
1900	271	+3.4%
1910	304	+12.2%
1921	276	−9.2%
1930	273	−1.1%
1950	221	−19.0%
1961	238	+7.7%
1970	246	+3.4%
1980	187	−24.0%
1991	158	−15.5%
2001	146	−7.6%
2011	149	+2.1%
2021	123	−17.4%
Source: Censuses
