= Lašovice =

- Municipality
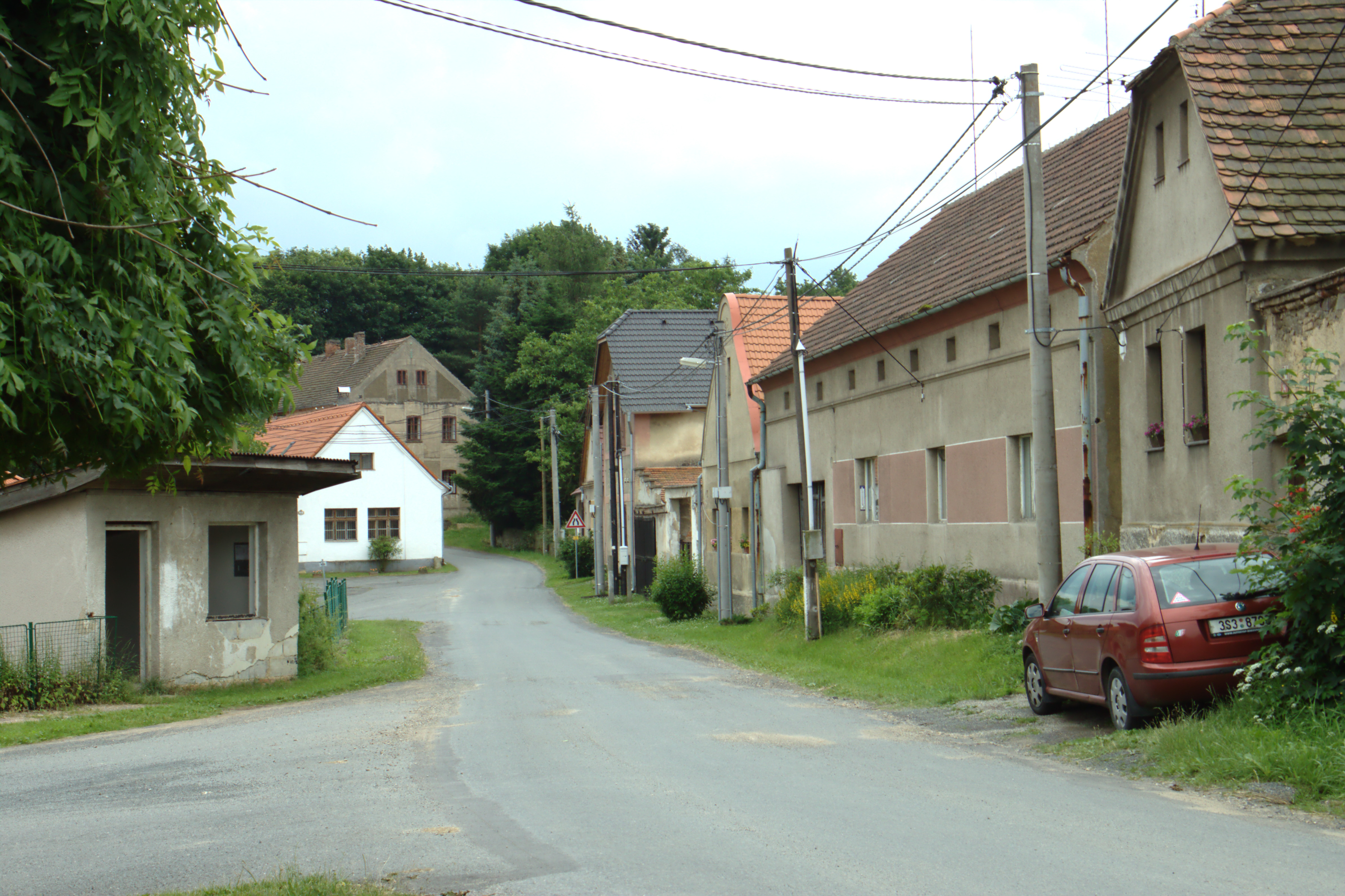
- A street in Lašovice

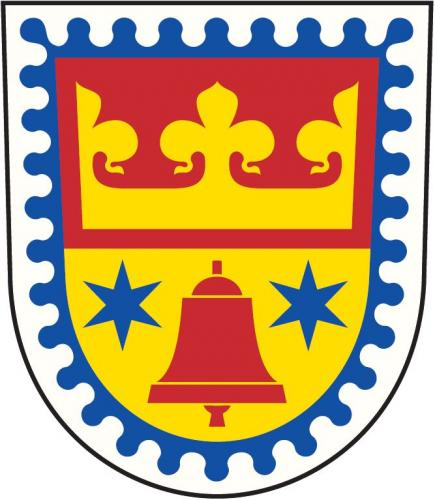
- Coat of arms

- Location in the Czech Republic
- Coordinates: 50°3′18″N 13°46′56″E
- Country: Czech Republic
- Region: Central Bohemian
- District: Rakovník
- First mentioned: 1143

Area
  - Total: 3.82 km^{2} (1.47 sq mi)
- Elevation: 378 m (1,240 ft)

Population (2026-01-01)
  - Total: 129
  - Density: 33.8/km^{2} (87.5/sq mi)
- Time zone: UTC+1 (CET)
  - Summer (DST): UTC+2 (CEST)
- Postal code: 270 21
- Website: www.lasovice.cz

Lašovice is a municipality and village in Rakovník District in the Central Bohemian Region of the Czech Republic. It has about 100 inhabitants.

== Demographics ==
Historical population
Year	Pop.	±%
1869	417	—
1880	436	+4.6%
1890	433	−0.7%
1900	498	+15.0%
1910	422	−15.3%
1921	417	−1.2%
1930	408	−2.2%
1950	281	−31.1%
1961	282	+0.4%
1970	248	−12.1%
1980	156	−37.1%
1991	116	−25.6%
2001	101	−12.9%
2011	133	+31.7%
2021	118	−11.3%
Source: Censuses
