= Nový Dům =

- Municipality
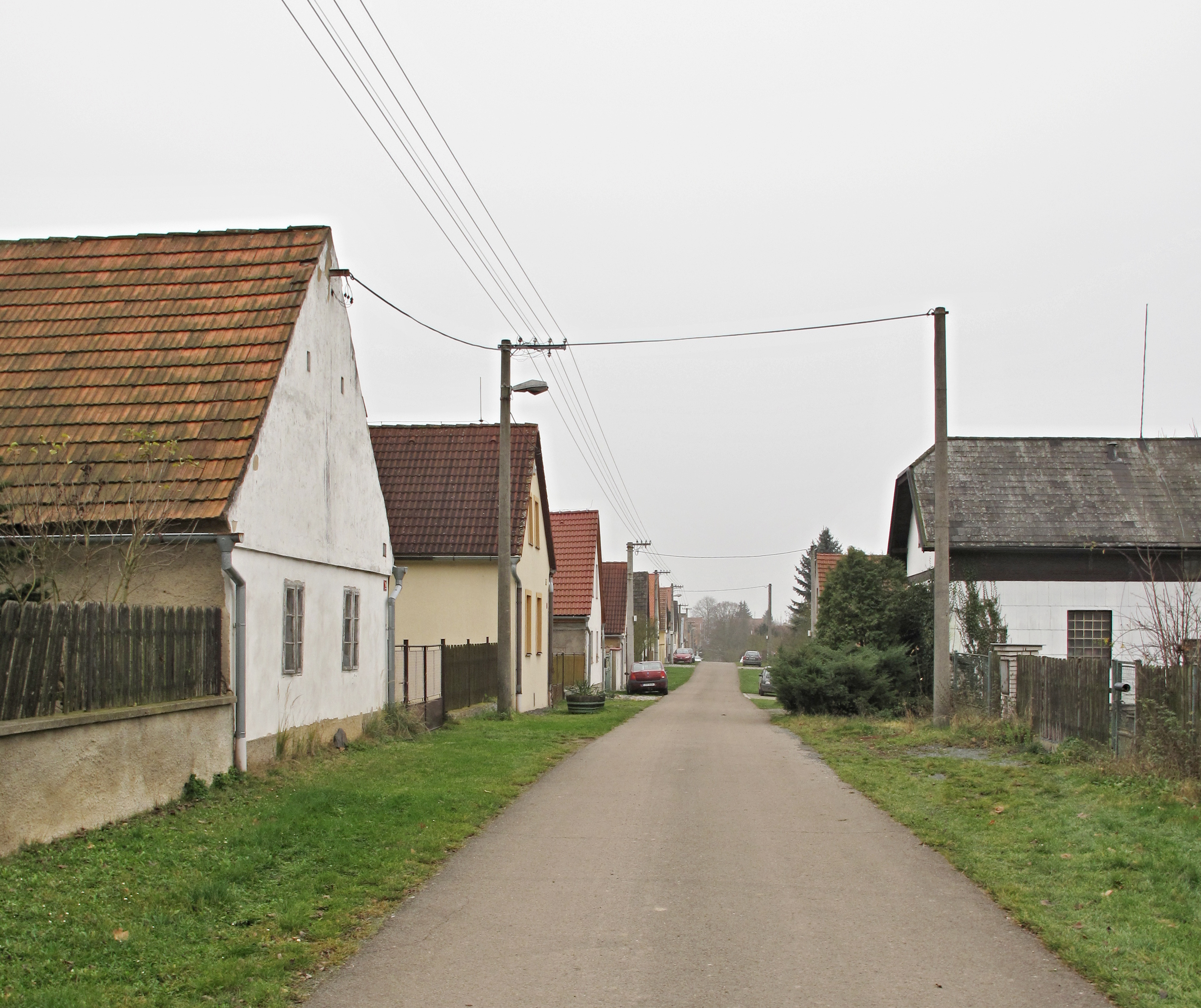
- A street in Nový Dům

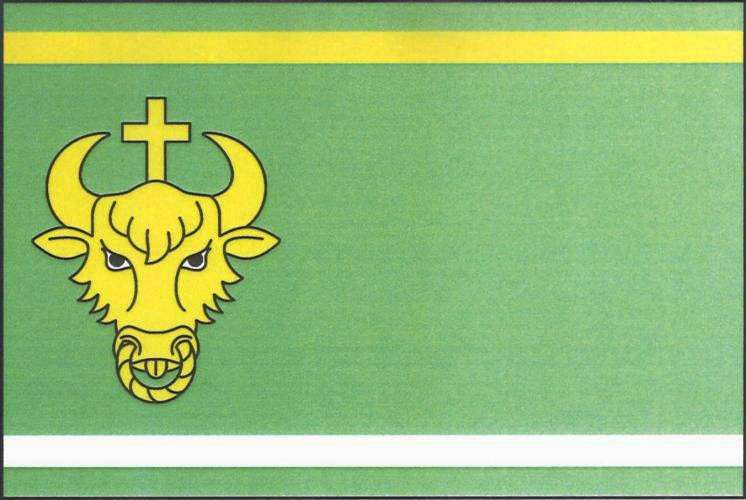
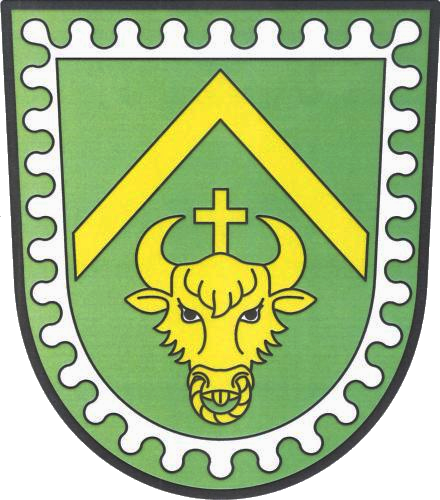
- Flag Coat of arms

- Location in the Czech Republic
- Coordinates: 50°5′18″N 13°49′51″E
- Country: Czech Republic
- Region: Central Bohemian
- District: Rakovník
- First mentioned: 1657

Area
  - Total: 6.29 km^{2} (2.43 sq mi)
- Elevation: 405 m (1,329 ft)

Population (2026-01-01)
  - Total: 176
  - Density: 28.0/km^{2} (72.5/sq mi)
- Time zone: UTC+1 (CET)
  - Summer (DST): UTC+2 (CEST)
- Postal code: 269 01
- Website: www.obecnovydum.cz

Nový Dům is a municipality and village in Rakovník District in the Central Bohemian Region of the Czech Republic. It has about 200 inhabitants.

== Demographics ==
Historical population
Year	Pop.	±%
1869	392	—
1880	408	+4.1%
1890	476	+16.7%
1900	428	−10.1%
1910	418	−2.3%
1921	454	+8.6%
1930	403	−11.2%
1950	248	−38.5%
1961	198	−20.2%
1970	189	−4.5%
1980	225	+19.0%
1991	182	−19.1%
2001	156	−14.3%
2011	139	−10.9%
2021	156	+12.2%
Source: Censuses
