= Milý =

- Municipality
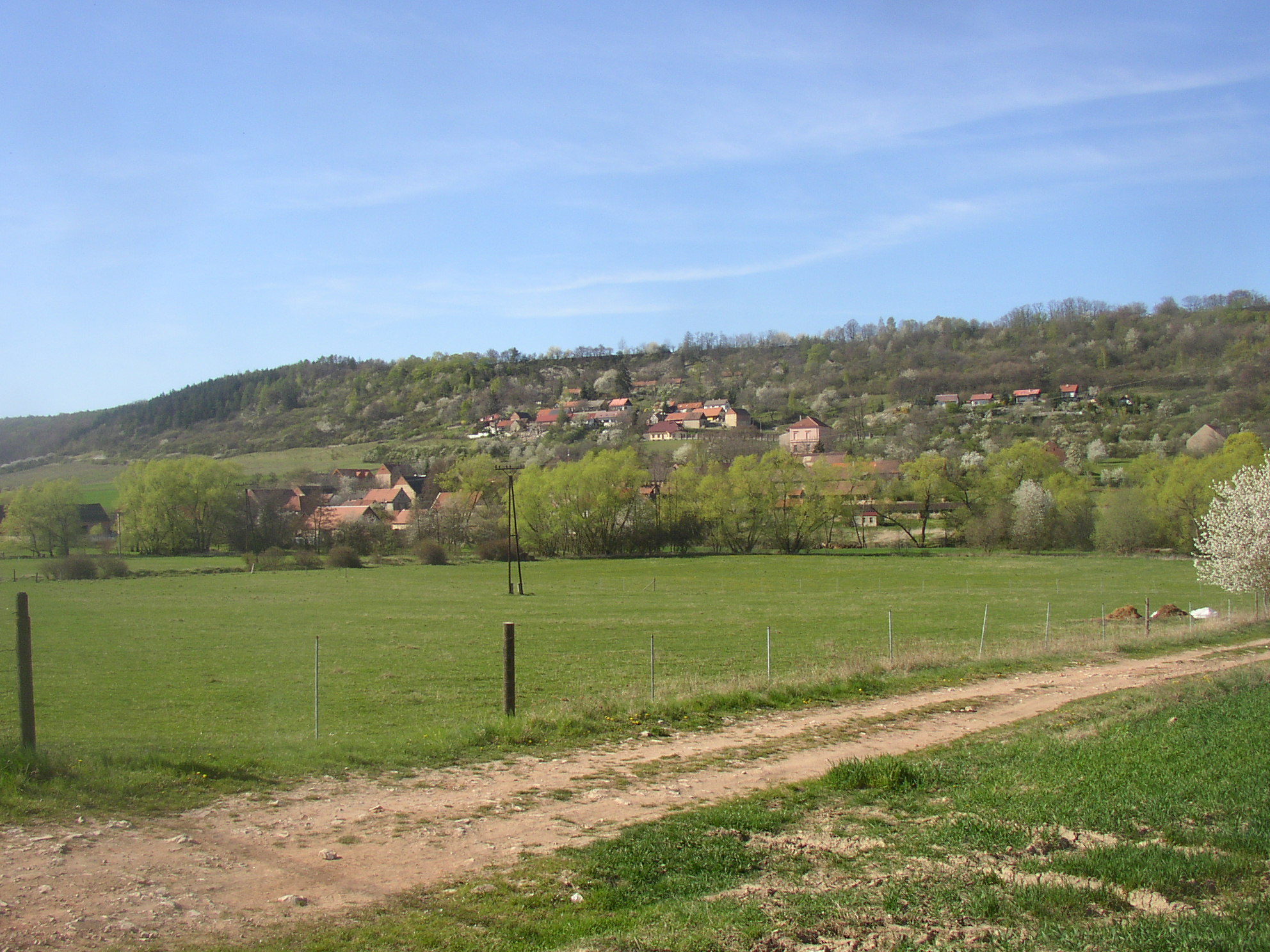
- View from the southeast

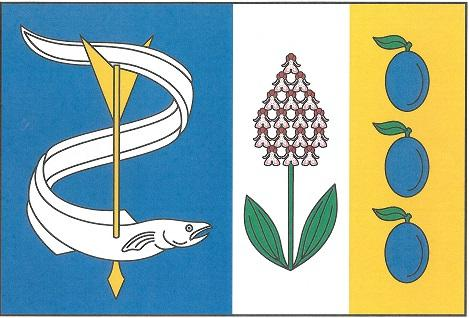
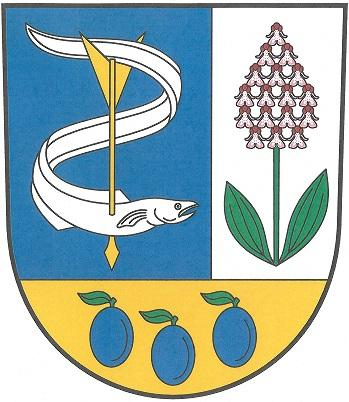
- Flag Coat of arms

- Location in the Czech Republic
- Coordinates: 50°13′58″N 13°52′2″E
- Country: Czech Republic
- Region: Central Bohemian
- District: Rakovník
- First mentioned: 1381

Area
  - Total: 8.70 km^{2} (3.36 sq mi)
- Elevation: 350 m (1,150 ft)

Population (2026-01-01)
  - Total: 221
  - Density: 25.4/km^{2} (65.8/sq mi)
- Time zone: UTC+1 (CET)
  - Summer (DST): UTC+2 (CEST)
- Postal code: 270 54
- Website: www.obec-mily.cz

Milý is a municipality and village in Rakovník District in the Central Bohemian Region of the Czech Republic. It has about 200 inhabitants.

== Demographics ==
Historical population
| Year | Pop. | ±% |
|---|---|---|
| 1869 | 413 | — |
| 1880 | 443 | +7.3% |
| 1890 | 448 | +1.1% |
| 1900 | 493 | +10.0% |
| 1910 | 515 | +4.5% |
| 1921 | 508 | −1.4% |
| 1930 | 452 | −11.0% |
| 1950 | 301 | −33.4% |
| 1961 | 293 | −2.7% |
| 1970 | 238 | −18.8% |
| 1980 | 192 | −19.3% |
| 1991 | 133 | −30.7% |
| 2001 | 118 | −11.3% |
| 2011 | 163 | +38.1% |
| 2021 | 194 | +19.0% |
Source: Censuses
