= Příčina =

- Municipality
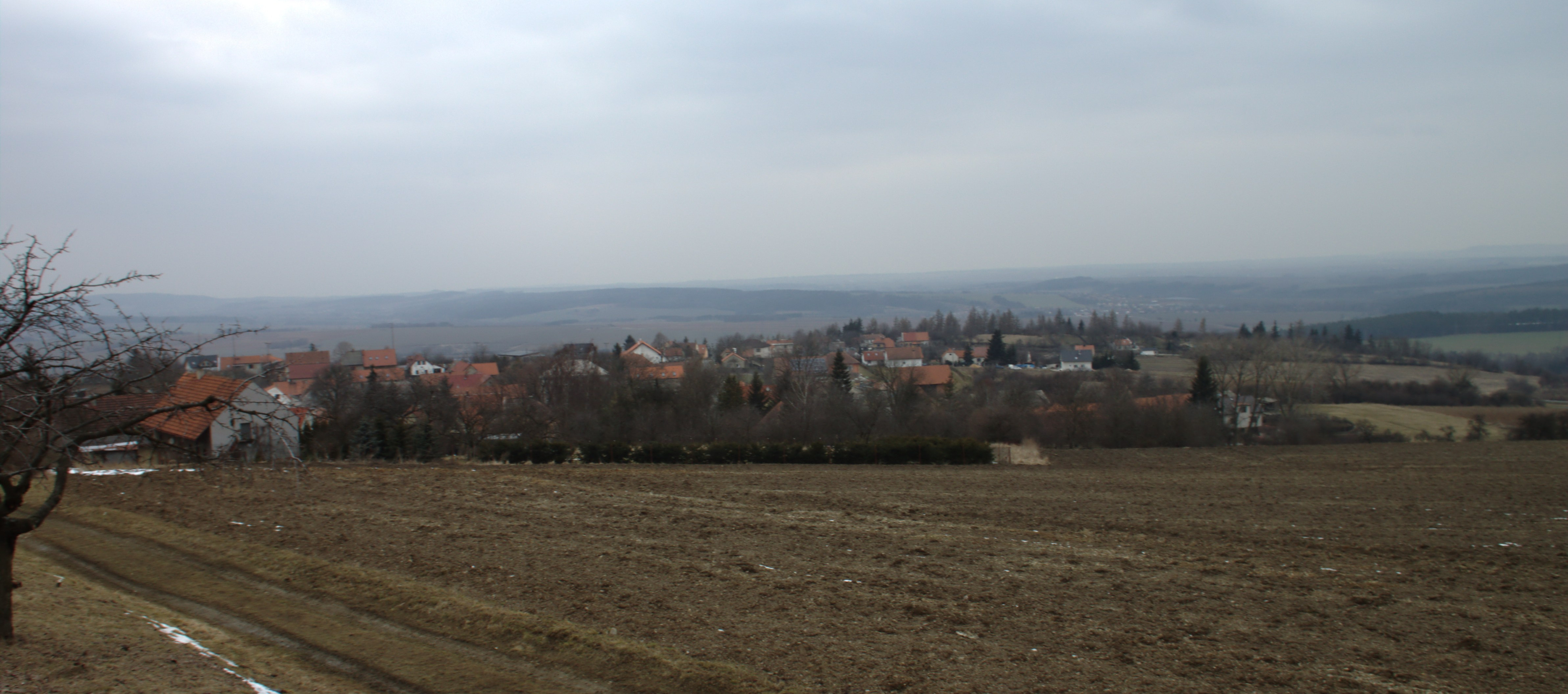
- General view

- Flag Coat of arms

- Location in the Czech Republic
- Coordinates: 50°3′57″N 13°40′2″E
- Country: Czech Republic
- Region: Central Bohemian
- District: Rakovník
- First mentioned: 1357

Area
  - Total: 2.19 km^{2} (0.85 sq mi)
- Elevation: 475 m (1,558 ft)

Population (2026-01-01)
  - Total: 210
  - Density: 96/km^{2} (250/sq mi)
- Time zone: UTC+1 (CET)
  - Summer (DST): UTC+2 (CEST)
- Postal code: 270 35
- Website: www.pricina.cz

Příčina is a municipality and village in Rakovník District in the Central Bohemian Region of the Czech Republic. It has about 200 inhabitants.

== Demographics ==
Historical population
Year	Pop.	±%
1869	332	—
1880	558	+68.1%
1890	361	−35.3%
1900	317	−12.2%
1910	377	+18.9%
1921	416	+10.3%
1930	405	−2.6%
1950	307	−24.2%
1961	316	+2.9%
1970	285	−9.8%
1980	207	−27.4%
1991	187	−9.7%
2001	164	−12.3%
2011	180	+9.8%
2021	206	+14.4%
Source: Censuses
