= Svojetín =

- Municipality
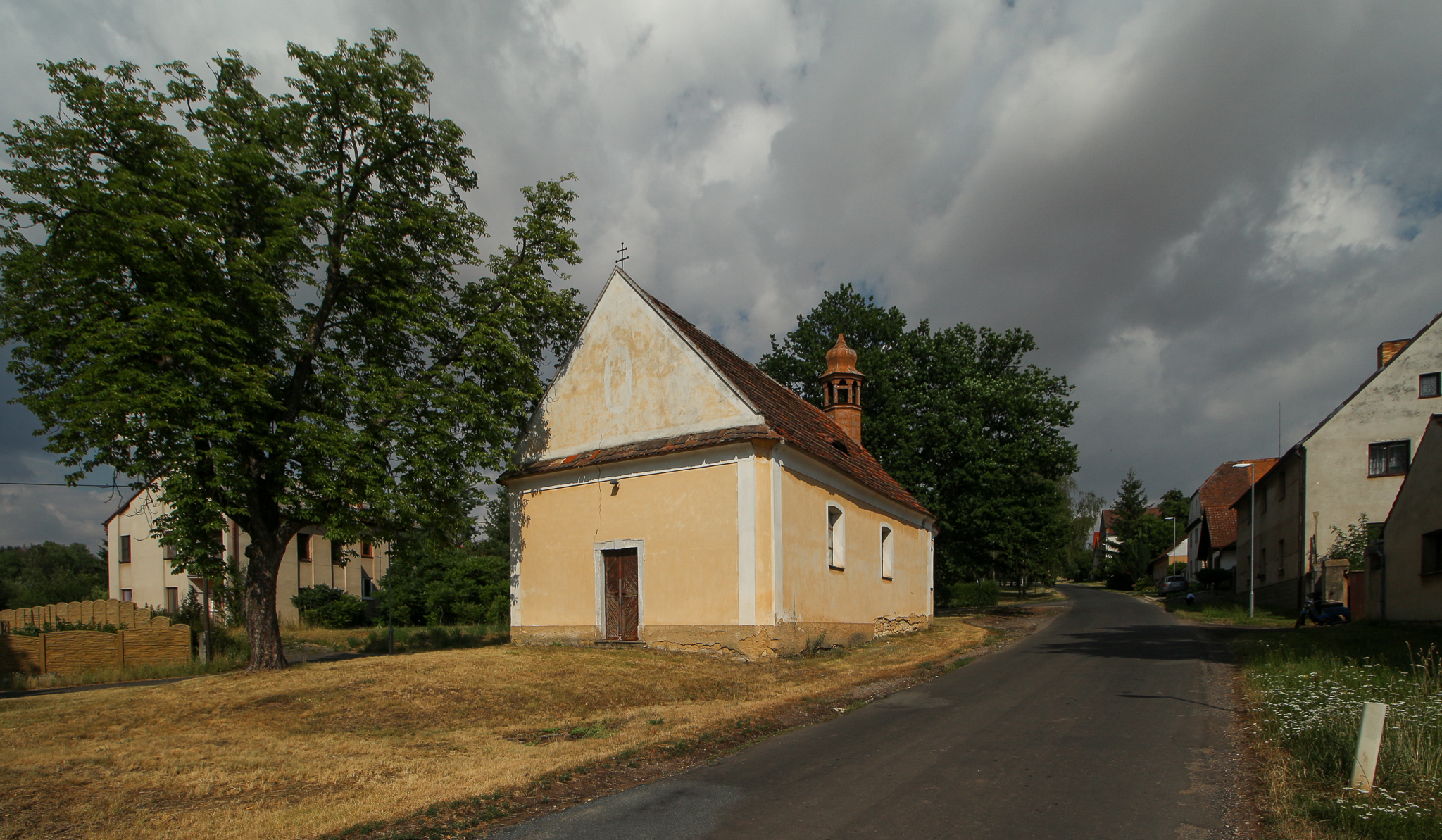
- Chapel of Saint John of Nepomuk

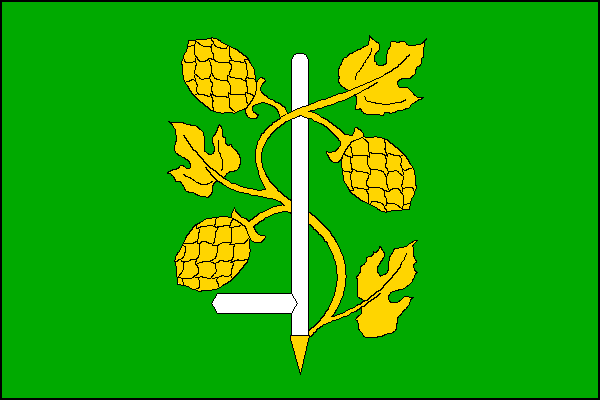
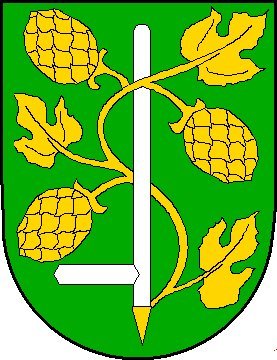
- Flag Coat of arms

- Location in the Czech Republic
- Coordinates: 50°11′24″N 13°37′16″E
- Country: Czech Republic
- Region: Central Bohemian
- District: Rakovník
- First mentioned: 1318

Area
  - Total: 8.83 km^{2} (3.41 sq mi)
- Elevation: 400 m (1,300 ft)

Population (2026-01-01)
  - Total: 365
  - Density: 41.3/km^{2} (107/sq mi)
- Time zone: UTC+1 (CET)
  - Summer (DST): UTC+2 (CEST)
- Postal code: 270 04
- Website: www.svojetin.cz

Svojetín (German: Swojetin) is a municipality and village in Rakovník District in the Central Bohemian Region of the Czech Republic. It has about 400 inhabitants.

== Administrative division ==
Svojetín consists of two municipal parts (in brackets population according to the 2021 census):

- Svojetín (298)
- Veclov (62)

== Demographics ==
Historical population
Year	Pop.	±%
1869	610	—
1880	757	+24.1%
1890	804	+6.2%
1900	817	+1.6%
1910	897	+9.8%
1921	958	+6.8%
1930	1,019	+6.4%
1950	551	−45.9%
1961	510	−7.4%
1970	458	−10.2%
1980	392	−14.4%
1991	314	−19.9%
2001	337	+7.3%
2011	350	+3.9%
2021	360	+2.9%
Source: Censuses
