= Řeřichy =

- Municipality
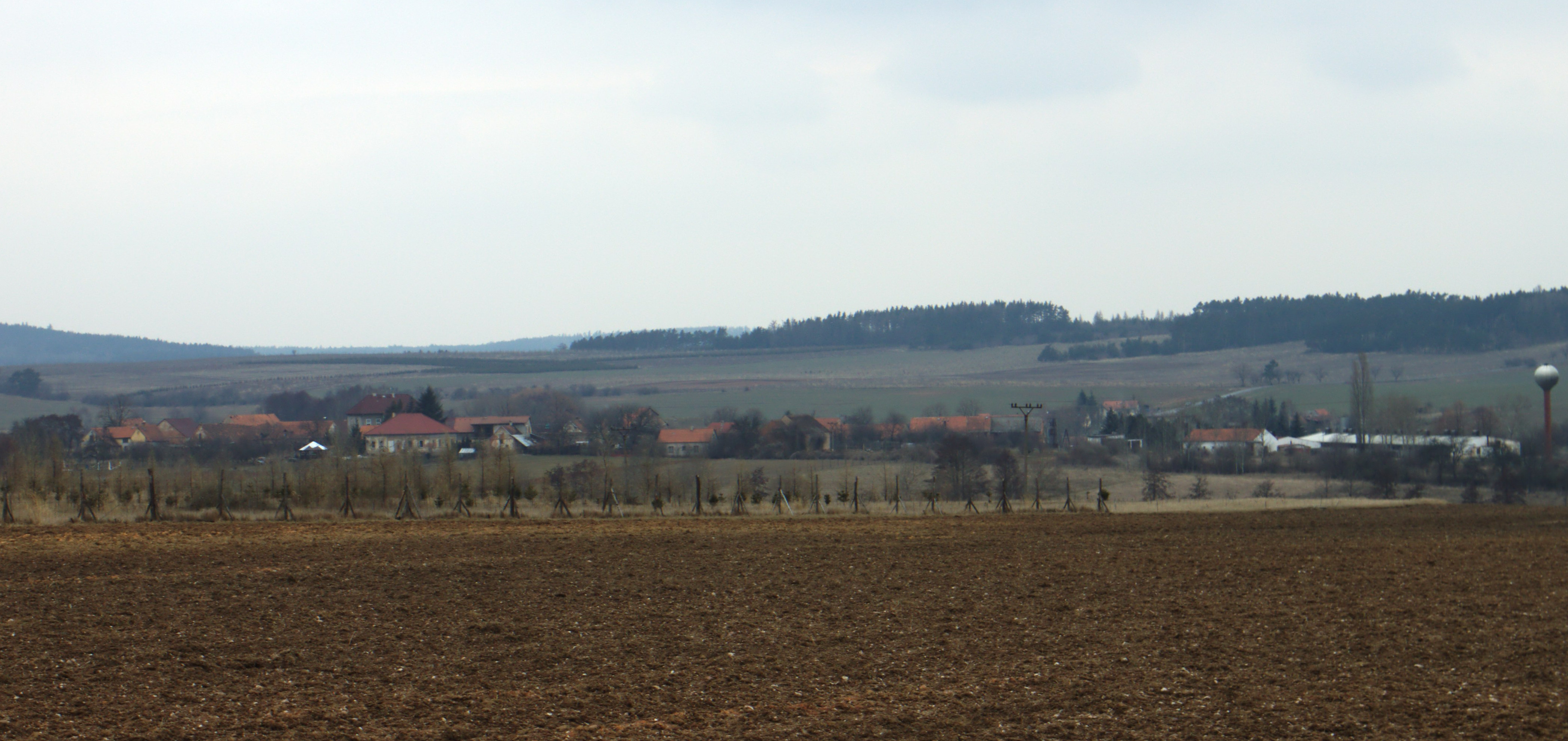
- View from the south

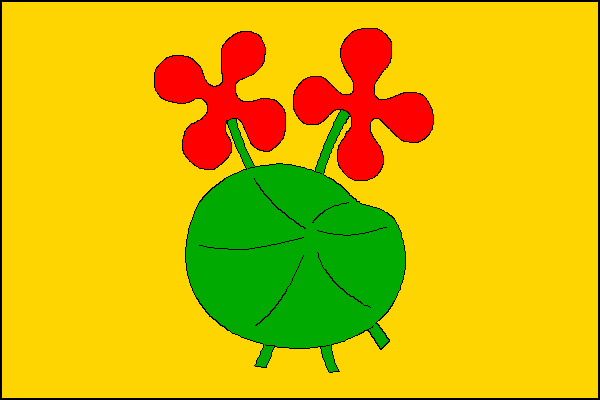
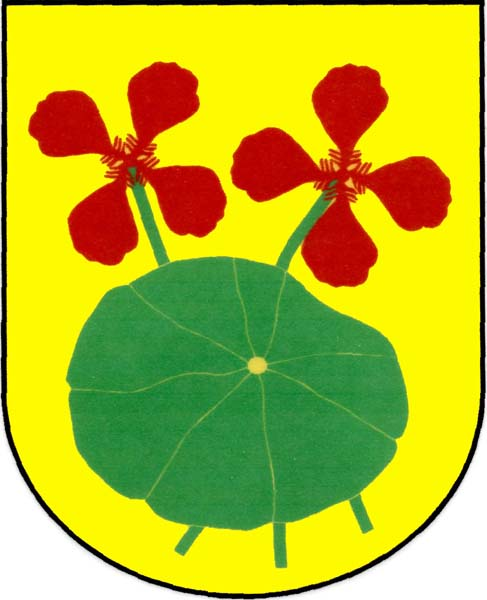
- Flag Coat of arms

- Location in the Czech Republic
- Coordinates: 50°4′45″N 13°35′9″E
- Country: Czech Republic
- Region: Central Bohemian
- District: Rakovník
- First mentioned: 1377

Area
  - Total: 4.87 km^{2} (1.88 sq mi)
- Elevation: 391 m (1,283 ft)

Population (2026-01-01)
  - Total: 109
  - Density: 22.4/km^{2} (58.0/sq mi)
- Time zone: UTC+1 (CET)
  - Summer (DST): UTC+2 (CEST)
- Postal code: 270 35
- Website: www.rerichy.cz

Řeřichy (German: Röscha) is a municipality and village in Rakovník District in the Central Bohemian Region of the Czech Republic. It has about 100 inhabitants.

== Administrative division ==
Řeřichy consists of two municipal parts (in brackets population according to the 2021 census):

- Řeřichy (96)
- Nový Dvůr (18)

== Demographics ==
Historical population
Year	Pop.	±%
1869	258	—
1880	273	+5.8%
1890	323	+18.3%
1900	313	−3.1%
1910	308	−1.6%
1921	299	−2.9%
1930	284	−5.0%
1950	201	−29.2%
1961	158	−21.4%
1970	149	−5.7%
1980	131	−12.1%
1991	105	−19.8%
2001	90	−14.3%
2011	107	+18.9%
2021	114	+6.5%
Source: Censuses
