= Rakovník District =

Rakovník District Okres Rakovník
- District
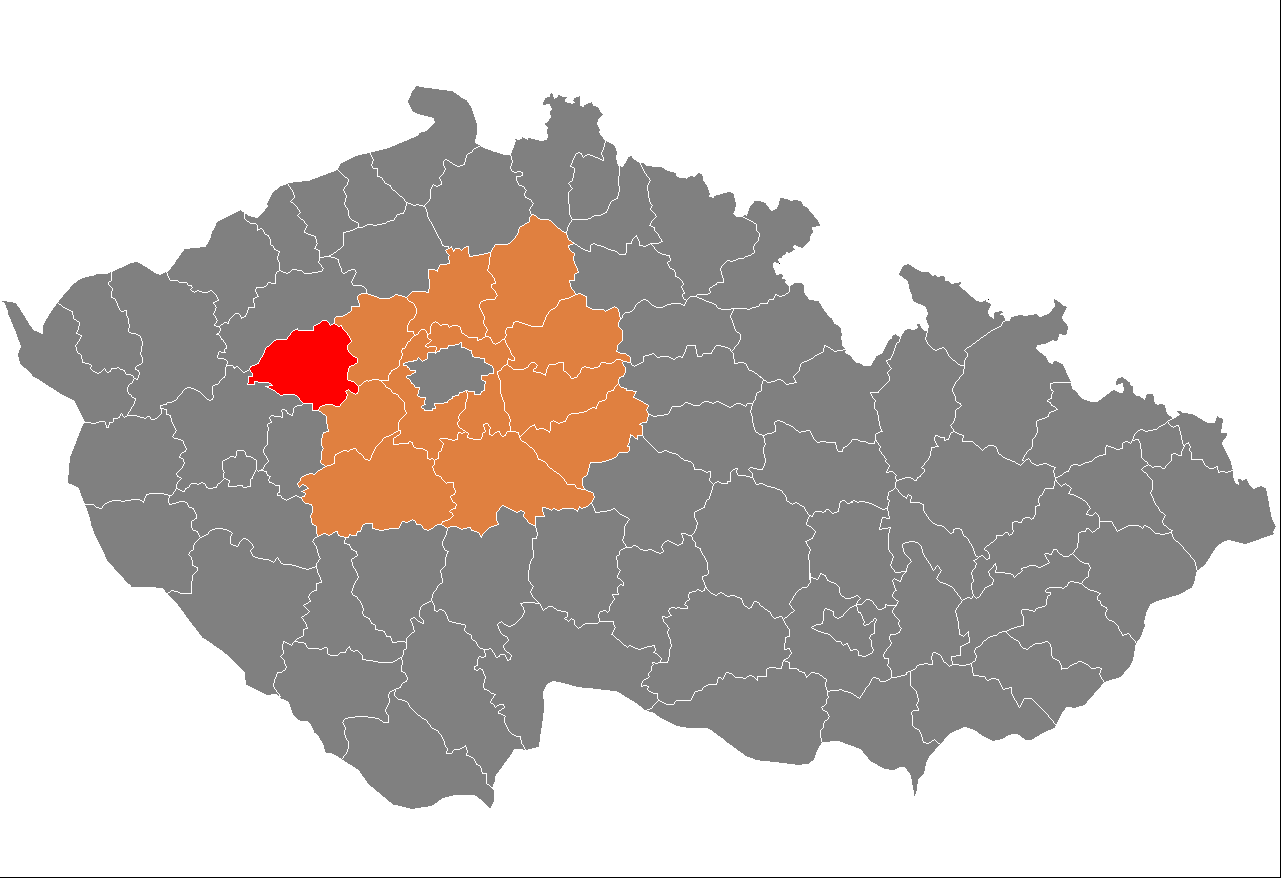
- Location in the Central Bohemian Region within the Czech Republic

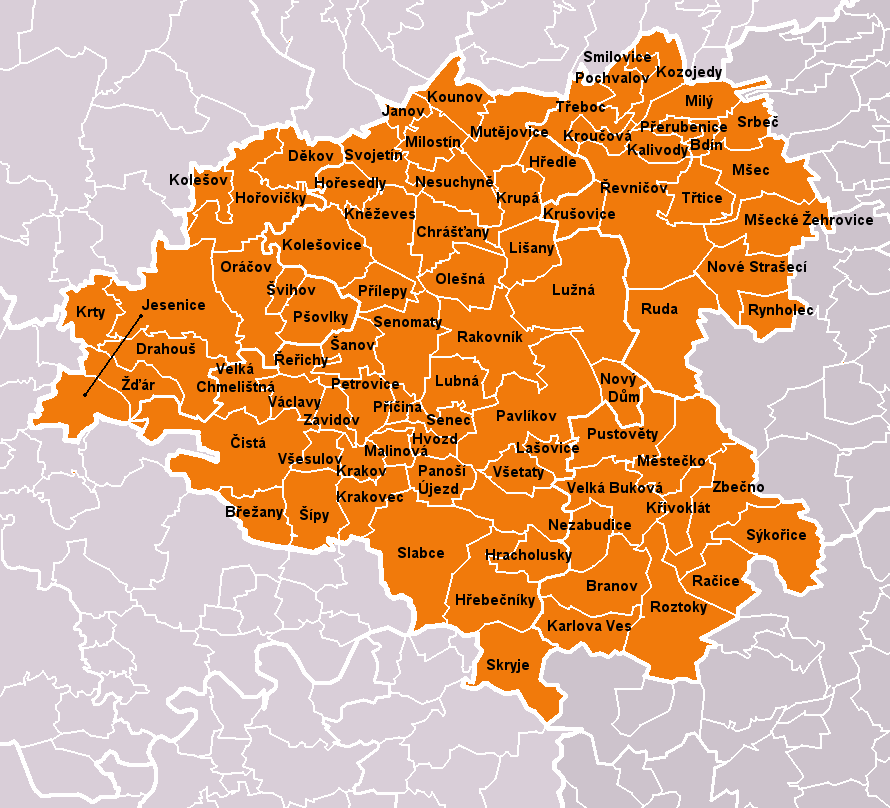
- Coordinates: 50°6′N 13°44′E
- Country: Czech Republic
- Region: Central Bohemian
- Capital: Rakovník

Area
  - Total: 896.29 km^{2} (346.06 sq mi)

Population (2026)
  - Total: 56,747
  - Density: 63.313/km^{2} (163.98/sq mi)
- Time zone: UTC+1 (CET)
  - Summer (DST): UTC+2 (CEST)
- Municipalities: 83
- * Towns: 3
- * Market towns: 7

Rakovník District (Czech: okres Rakovník) is a district in the Central Bohemian Region of the Czech Republic. Its capital is the town of Rakovník.

== Administrative division ==
Rakovník District is formed by only one administrative district of municipality with extended competence: Rakovník.

=== List of municipalities ===
Towns are marked in bold and market towns in italics:

Bdín – Branov – Břežany – Chrášťany – Čistá – Děkov – Drahouš – Hořesedly – Hořovičky – Hracholusky – Hřebečníky – Hředle – Hvozd – Janov – Jesenice – Kalivody – Karlova Ves – Kněževes – Kolešov – Kolešovice – Kounov – Kozojedy – Krakov – Krakovec – Kroučová – Krty – Krupá – Krušovice – Křivoklát – Lašovice – Lišany – Lubná – Lužná – Malinová – Městečko – Milostín – Milý – Mšec – Mšecké Žehrovice – Mutějovice – Nesuchyně – Nezabudice – Nové Strašecí – Nový Dům – Olešná – Oráčov – Panoší Újezd – Pavlíkov – Petrovice – Pochvalov – Přerubenice – Příčina – Přílepy – Pšovlky – Pustověty – Račice – Rakovník – Řeřichy – Řevničov – Roztoky – Ruda – Rynholec – Šanov – Senec – Senomaty – Šípy – Skryje – Slabce – Smilovice – Srbeč – Švihov – Svojetín – Sýkořice – Třeboc – Třtice – Václavy – Velká Buková – Velká Chmelištná – Všesulov – Všetaty – Zavidov – Zbečno – Žďár

== Geography ==
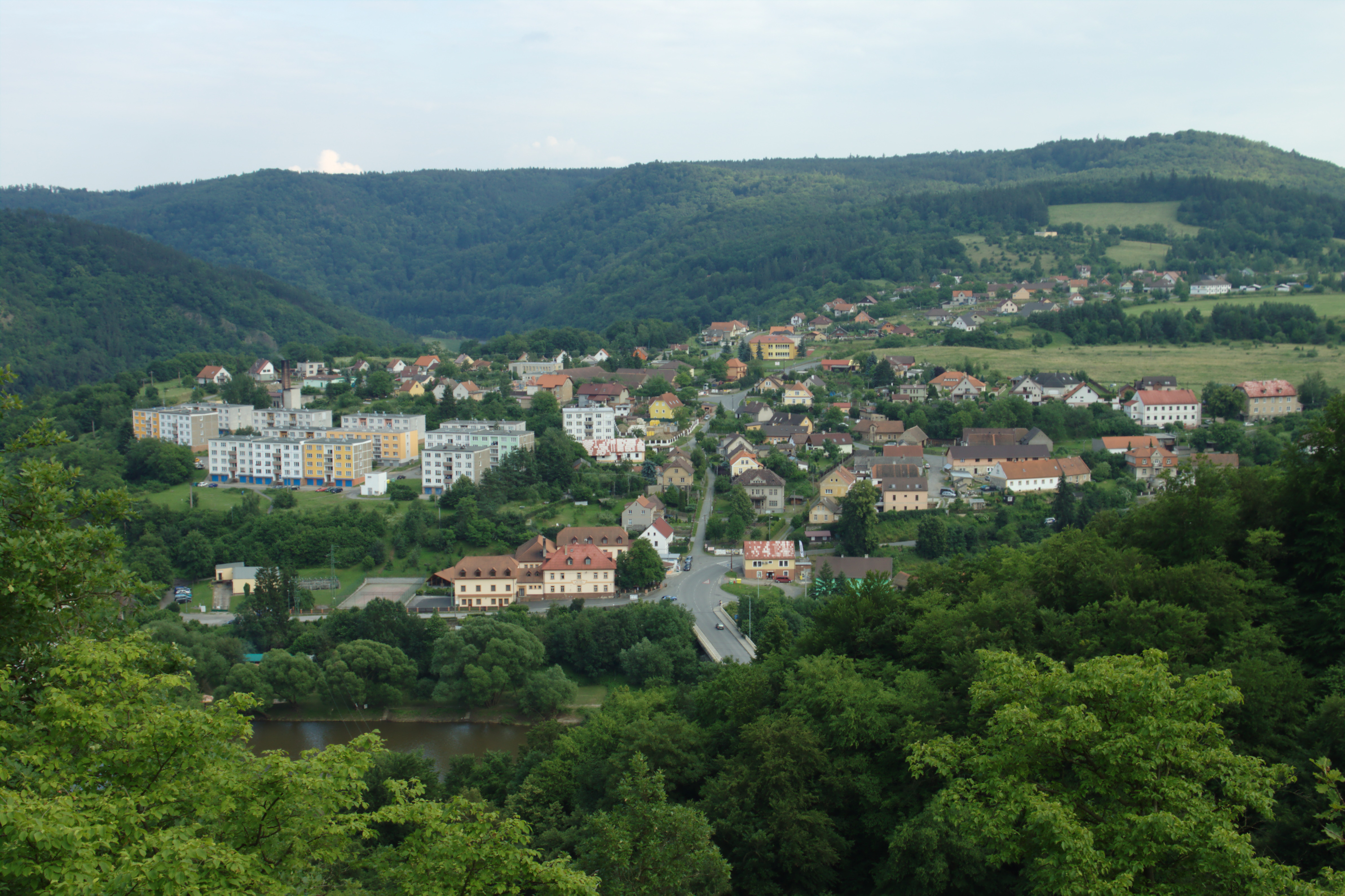
Roztoky and surrounding landscape

Slightly undulating plateaus and hilly landscape are typical for the district. The territory extends into four geomorphological mesoregions: Rakovník Uplands (west), Plasy Uplands (southwest), Křivoklát Highlands (southeast) and Džbán (north). The highest point of the district is the hill Vlastec in Skryje with an elevation of 612 m (2,008 ft), the lowest point is the river bed of the Berounka in Račice at 224 m (735 ft).

From the total district area of 896.3 km^{2} (346.1 sq mi), agricultural land occupies 468.6 km^{2} (180.9 sq mi), forests occupy 341.7 km^{2} (131.9 sq mi), and water area occupies 12.5 km^{2} (4.8 sq mi). Forests cover 38.1% of the district's area.

The most important river is the Berounka, which flows through a valley in the southern part of the district. Other notable watercourses are its tributaries, the Loděnice and Rakovnický potok, which originate here and supply several fishponds. The largest body of water in the district is Klíčava Reservoir, even if it lies only partially in the district.

Křivoklátsko is the only protected landscape area. However, it covers a large part of the district in its southern and eastern parts.

== Demographics ==
Historical population

Year	Pop.	±%
1869	63,925	—
1880	67,148	+5.0%
1890	66,111	−1.5%
1900	67,506	+2.1%
1910	70,806	+4.9%

Year	Pop.	±%
1921	71,353	+0.8%
1930	74,055	+3.8%
1950	58,094	−21.6%
1961	57,844	−0.4%
1970	54,437	−5.9%

Year	Pop.	±%
1980	55,110	+1.2%
1991	53,545	−2.8%
2001	52,487	−2.0%
2011	54,993	+4.8%
2021	55,185	+0.3%

Source: Censuses

=== Most populous municipalities ===
Name	Population	Area (km^{2})
Rakovník	15,745	19
Nové Strašecí	5,710	13
Lužná	1,988	30
Jesenice	1,638	38
Řevničov	1,537	29
Senomaty	1,307	14
Lubná	1,119	9
Rynholec	1,097	6
Pavlíkov	1,071	39
Kněževes	1,025	13

== Economy ==
The largest employers with headquarters in Rakovník District and at least 500 employees are:

Economic entity	Location	Number of employees	Main activity
Valeo Autoklimatizace	Rakovník	2,500–2,999	Manufacture of car air conditioners
Heineken Česká republika	Krušovice	500–999	Production of beverages
Purem Rakovník	Rakovník	500–999	Automotive industry

== Transport ==
The D6 motorway from Prague to Karlovy Vary, including its unfinished section, passes through the district.

== Sights ==
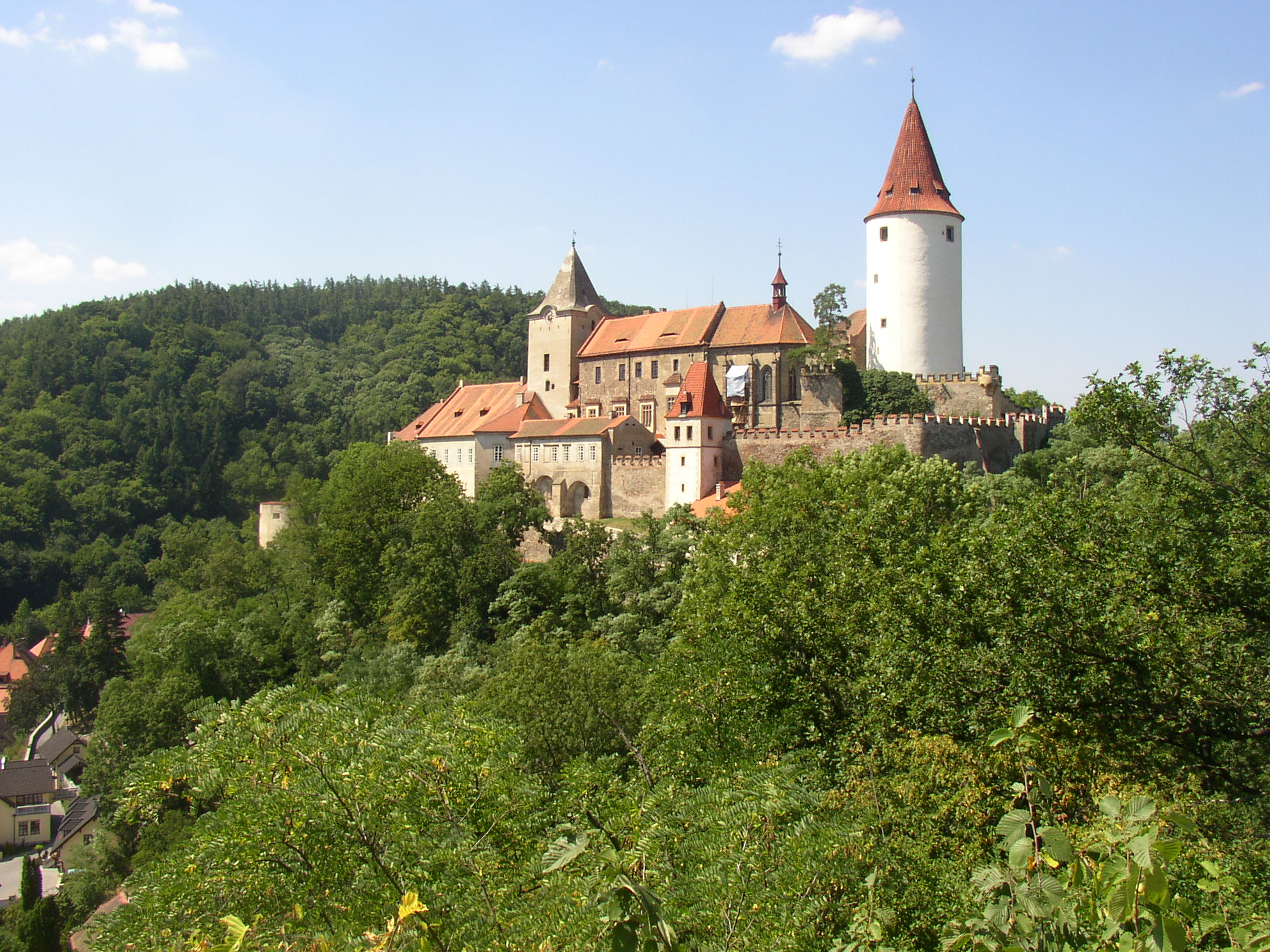
Křivoklát Castle

The most important monuments in the district, protected as national cultural monuments, are:

- Křivoklát Castle
- Sokol Hall in Rakovník

The best-preserved settlements, protected as monument zones, are:

- Rakovník
- Rousínov
- Skryje

The most visited tourist destination is the Křivoklát Castle.
