= Kroučová =

- Municipality
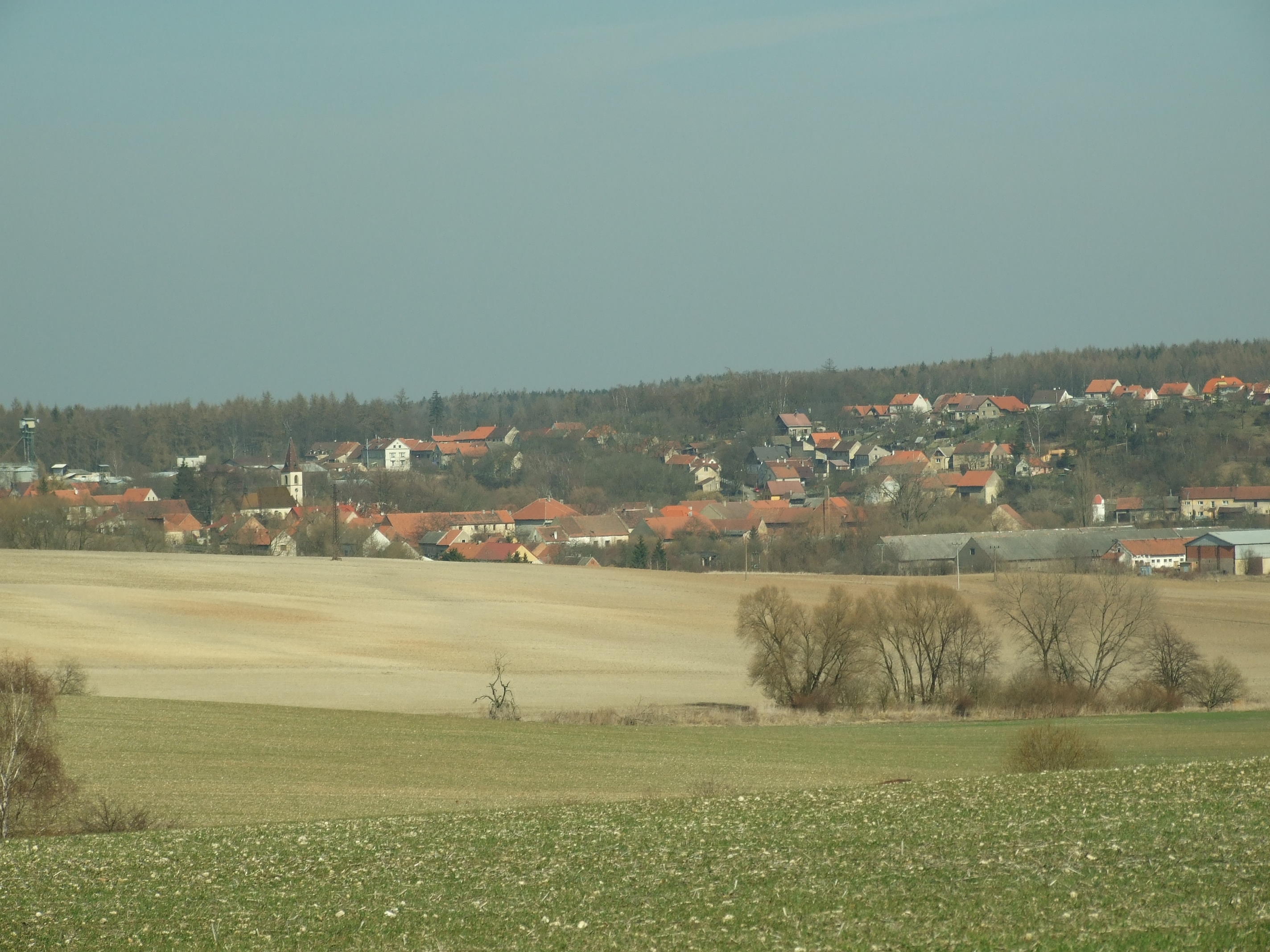
- View from the south

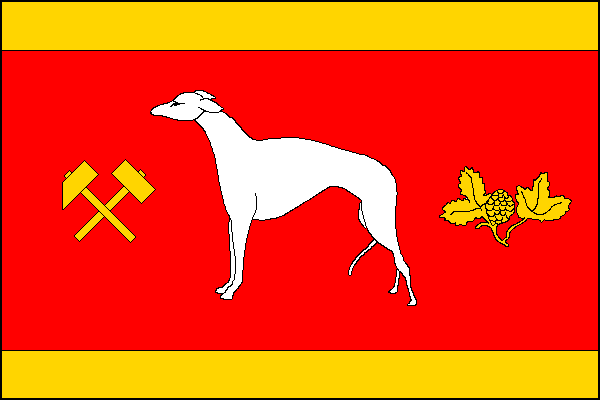
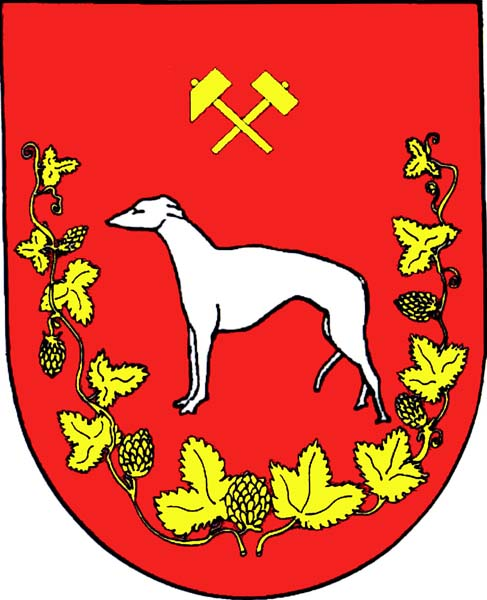
- Flag Coat of arms

- Location in the Czech Republic
- Coordinates: 50°12′25″N 13°47′2″E
- Country: Czech Republic
- Region: Central Bohemian
- District: Rakovník
- First mentioned: 1361

Area
  - Total: 3.46 km^{2} (1.34 sq mi)
- Elevation: 482 m (1,581 ft)

Population (2026-01-01)
  - Total: 285
  - Density: 82.4/km^{2} (213/sq mi)
- Time zone: UTC+1 (CET)
  - Summer (DST): UTC+2 (CEST)
- Postal code: 270 54
- Website: www.obec-kroucova.cz

Kroučová is a municipality and village in Rakovník District in the Central Bohemian Region of the Czech Republic. It has about 300 inhabitants.

== Demographics ==
Historical population
Year	Pop.	±%
1869	298	—
1880	325	+9.1%
1890	345	+6.2%
1900	330	−4.3%
1910	387	+17.3%
1921	411	+6.2%
1930	424	+3.2%
1950	353	−16.7%
1961	338	−4.2%
1970	343	+1.5%
1980	306	−10.8%
1991	261	−14.7%
2001	245	−6.1%
2011	253	+3.3%
2021	280	+10.7%
Source: Censuses
