= Všesulov =

- Municipality
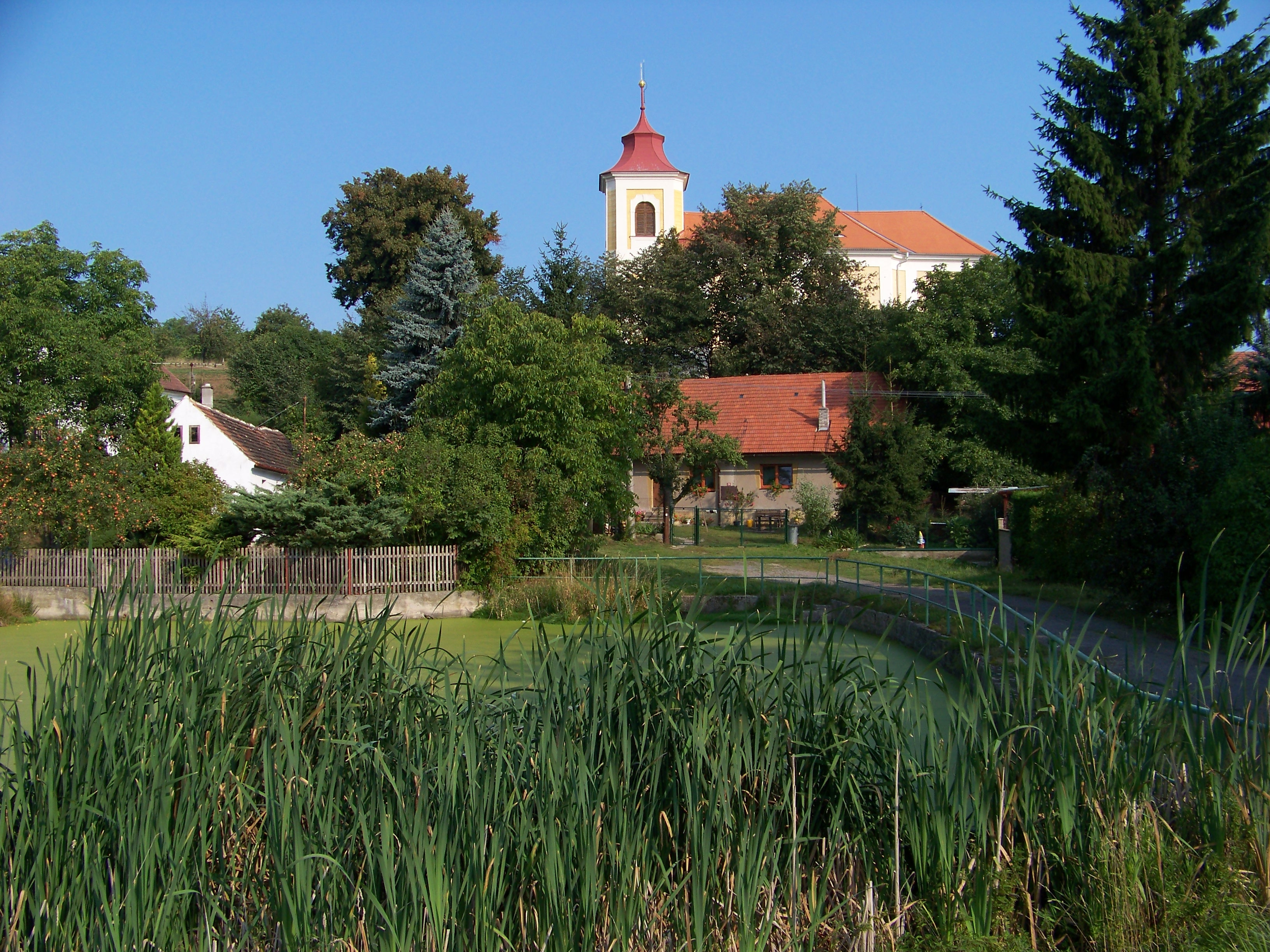
- Church of Saint Martin

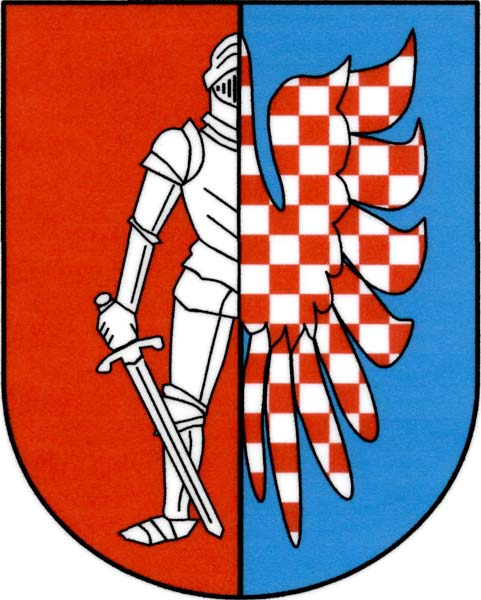
- Flag Coat of arms

- Location in the Czech Republic
- Coordinates: 50°2′23″N 13°36′39″E
- Country: Czech Republic
- Region: Central Bohemian
- District: Rakovník
- First mentioned: 1352

Area
  - Total: 4.17 km^{2} (1.61 sq mi)
- Elevation: 475 m (1,558 ft)

Population (2026-01-01)
  - Total: 107
  - Density: 25.7/km^{2} (66.5/sq mi)
- Time zone: UTC+1 (CET)
  - Summer (DST): UTC+2 (CEST)
- Postal code: 270 34
- Website: www.vsesulov.cz

Všesulov is a municipality and village in Rakovník District in the Central Bohemian Region of the Czech Republic. It has about 100 inhabitants.

== Demographics ==
Historical population
| Year | Pop. | ±% |
|---|---|---|
| 1869 | 271 | — |
| 1880 | 265 | −2.2% |
| 1890 | 252 | −4.9% |
| 1900 | 257 | +2.0% |
| 1910 | 223 | −13.2% |
| 1921 | 307 | +37.7% |
| 1930 | 270 | −12.1% |
| 1950 | 159 | −41.1% |
| 1961 | 191 | +20.1% |
| 1970 | 165 | −13.6% |
| 1980 | 100 | −39.4% |
| 1991 | 91 | −9.0% |
| 2001 | 94 | +3.3% |
| 2011 | 133 | +41.5% |
| 2021 | 99 | −25.6% |
Source: Censuses
