= Lišany (Rakovník District) =

- Municipality
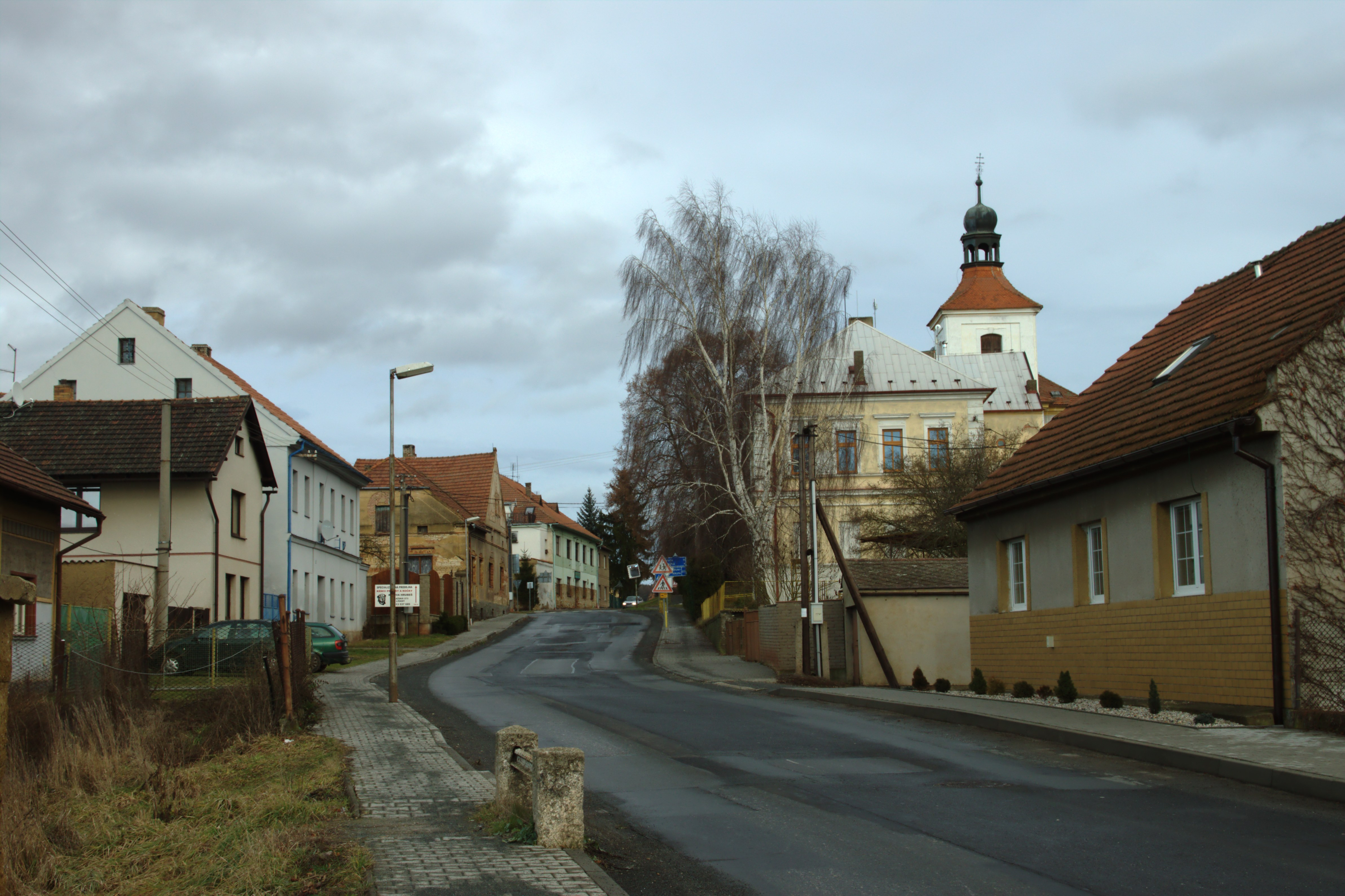
- Main street

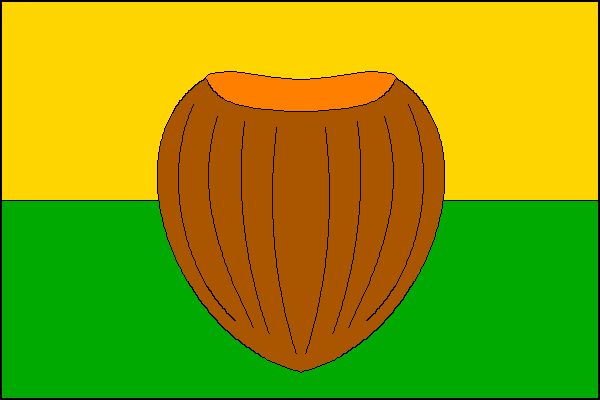
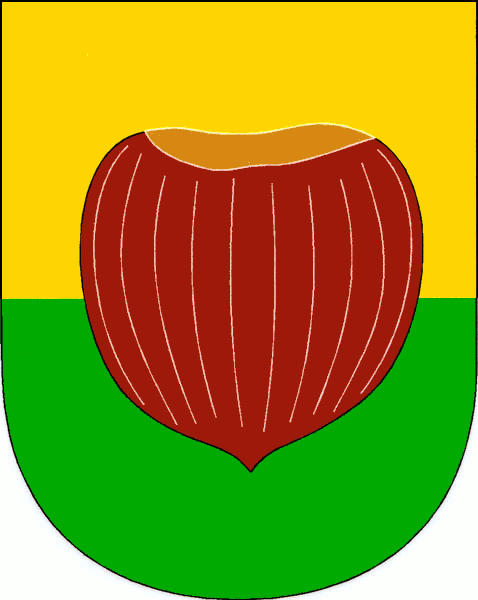
- Flag Coat of arms

- Location in the Czech Republic
- Coordinates: 50°8′51″N 13°44′31″E
- Country: Czech Republic
- Region: Central Bohemian
- District: Rakovník
- First mentioned: 1252

Area
  - Total: 8.94 km^{2} (3.45 sq mi)
- Elevation: 432 m (1,417 ft)

Population (2026-01-01)
  - Total: 694
  - Density: 77.6/km^{2} (201/sq mi)
- Time zone: UTC+1 (CET)
  - Summer (DST): UTC+2 (CEST)
- Postal code: 270 52
- Website: www.obec-lisany.cz

Lišany is a municipality and village in Rakovník District in the Central Bohemian Region of the Czech Republic. It has about 700 inhabitants.

== Demographics ==
Historical population
Year	Pop.	±%
1869	774	—
1880	868	+12.1%
1890	929	+7.0%
1900	955	+2.8%
1910	1,080	+13.1%
1921	1,096	+1.5%
1930	1,397	+27.5%
1950	1,104	−21.0%
1961	786	−28.8%
1970	676	−14.0%
1980	677	+0.1%
1991	591	−12.7%
2001	634	+7.3%
2011	653	+3.0%
2021	649	−0.6%
Source: Censuses
