= Roztoky (disambiguation) =

Roztoky is a town in the Central Bohemian Region of the Czech Republic.

Roztoky may also refer to places:

== Czech Republic ==
- Roztoky (Rakovník District), a municipality and village in the Central Bohemian Region
- Roztoky, a village and part of Povrly in the Ústí nad Labem Region
- Roztoky, a village and part of Šestajovice (Náchod District) in the Hradec Králové Region
- Roztoky u Jilemnice, a municipality and village in the Liberec Region
- Roztoky u Semil, a municipality and village in the Liberec Region

== Slovakia ==
- Roztoky, Svidník District, a municipality and village in the Prešov Region
