= Horní Bříza =

- Town
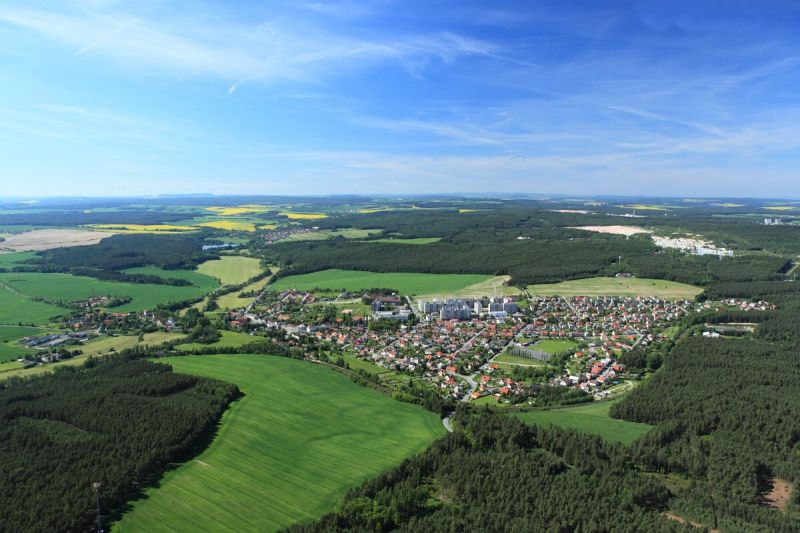
- Aerial view

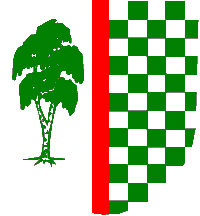
- Flag Coat of arms

- Location in the Czech Republic
- Coordinates: 49°50′39″N 13°21′48″E
- Country: Czech Republic
- Region: Plzeň
- District: Plzeň-North
- First mentioned: 1180

Government
  - Mayor: David Kapr

Area
  - Total: 14.55 km^{2} (5.62 sq mi)
- Elevation: 367 m (1,204 ft)

Population (2026-01-01)
  - Total: 4,041
  - Density: 277.7/km^{2} (719.3/sq mi)
- Time zone: UTC+1 (CET)
  - Summer (DST): UTC+2 (CEST)
- Postal code: 330 12
- Website: www.hornibriza.eu

Horní Bříza (Czech pronunciation: [ˈɦorɲiː ˈbr̝iːza]; German: Ober Birken) is a town in Plzeň-North District in the Plzeň Region of the Czech Republic. It has about 4,000 inhabitants.

== Etymology ==
The name Bříza means 'birch' in Czech. The settlement was founded near some notable birch tree. The prefix Horní ('upper') served to distinguish it from nearby Dolní Bříza ('lower Bříza'; today known as Břízsko, part of Kozojedy) and Německá Bříza (today known as Česká Bříza).

== Geography ==
Horní Bříza is located about 8 kilometres (5 mi) north of Plzeň. It lies in the Plasy Uplands. The highest point is at 492 m (1,614 ft) above sea level. The Bělá Stream flows through the town.

== History ==
The first written mention of Horní Bříza is from 1180. Around 1220, the village was donated to the monastery in Plasy.

The appearance of Horní Bříza changed after the great fire in 1865 and also with the construction of the railway line in the years 1871–1873. However, a significant turning point did not occur until the 1880s, when kaolin was discovered here. In 1882, Johann Fitz, a prominent businessman and mining expert from Rokycany, began with its mining. In 1886, he introduced the production of ceramic goods and founded a company which maintained dominant position in the ceramics industry for hundred years.

=== World War II ===
During World War II, some death trains taking Jews, outspoken people, gypsies, intellectuals, communists and Russian prisoners travelled through Horní Bříza. It was on the route to Mauthausen concentration camp, further south on the Danube River. On 21 April 1945, a death train stopped here as the line was blocked. The station master Antonín Pavlíček intervened and organised the townspeople to cook food and bread for the about 1,000 women being taken to Mauthausen. He asked the SS to leave the people there so the town could care for them, but they refused.

== Demographics ==
Historical population

Year	Pop.	±%
1869	328	—
1880	349	+6.4%
1890	451	+29.2%
1900	624	+38.4%
1910	884	+41.7%

Year	Pop.	±%
1921	1,327	+50.1%
1930	1,617	+21.9%
1950	1,752	+8.3%
1961	2,087	+19.1%
1970	2,323	+11.3%

Year	Pop.	±%
1980	3,122	+34.4%
1991	4,007	+28.3%
2001	4,487	+12.0%
2011	4,356	−2.9%
2021	4,105	−5.8%

Source: Censuses

== Transport ==
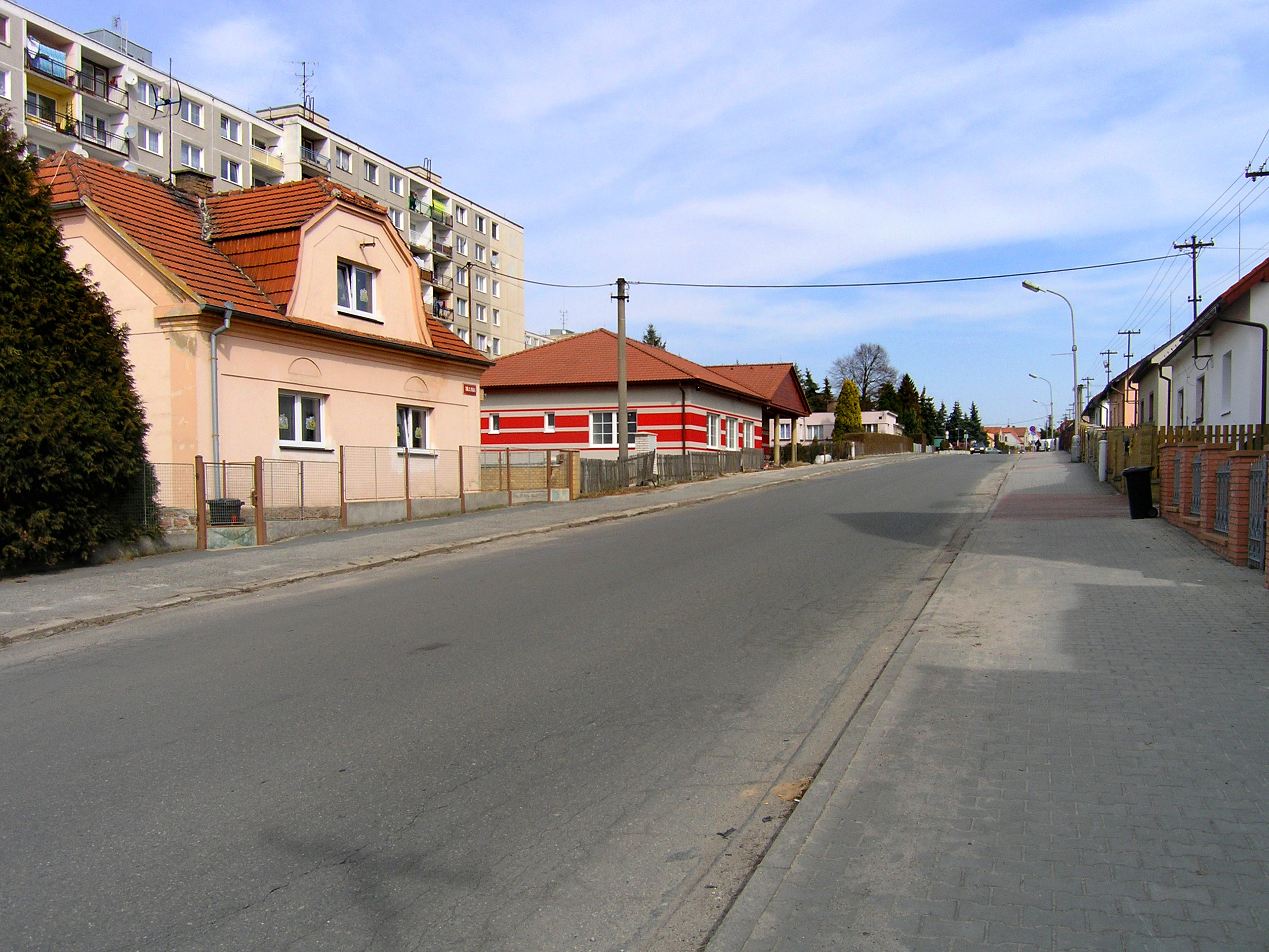
Main street

Horní Bříza is located on the railway line Plzeň–Plasy.

== Sights ==
The only protected cultural monuments in Horní Bříza are the Chapel of Saint Peter, built in the pseudo-Baroque style in 1840, and the Memorial to the Victims of World War II.

== Notable people ==
- Zdeněk Bláha (1929–2025), composer, editor and bagpiper

== Twin towns – sister cities ==
Horní Bříza is twinned with:

- Villeneuve-sur-Yonne, France
