= Branov =

- Municipality
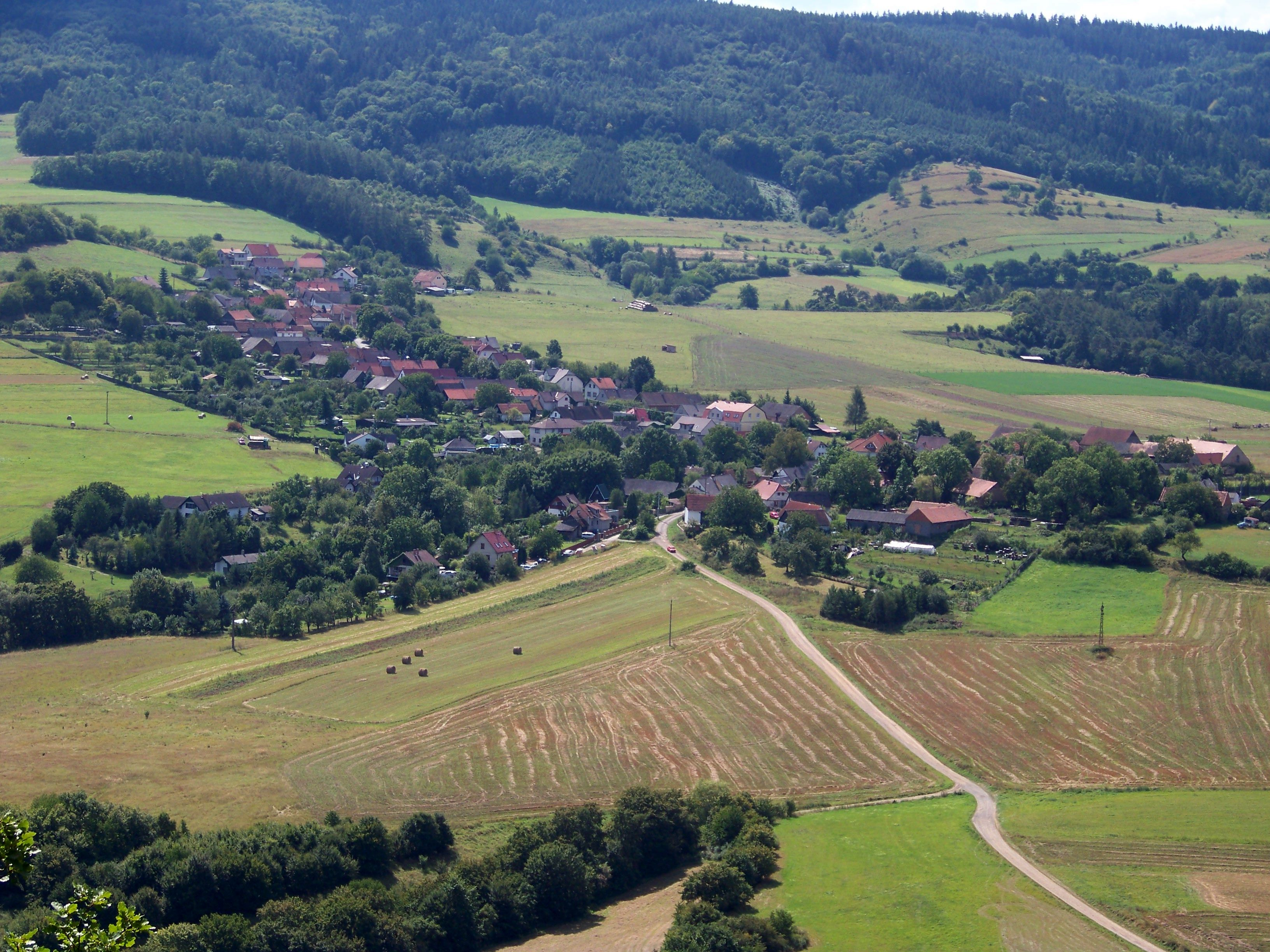
- General view

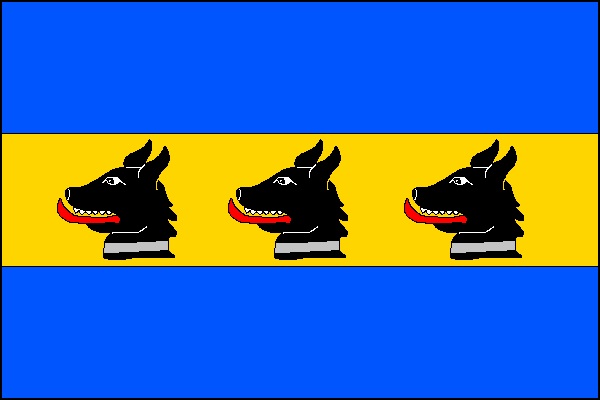
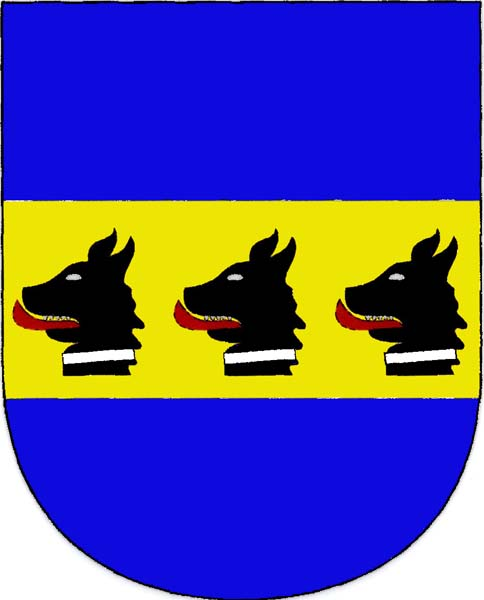
- Flag Coat of arms

- Location in the Czech Republic
- Coordinates: 50°0′47″N 13°50′35″E
- Country: Czech Republic
- Region: Central Bohemian
- District: Rakovník
- First mentioned: 1551

Area
  - Total: 14.84 km^{2} (5.73 sq mi)
- Elevation: 309 m (1,014 ft)

Population (2026-01-01)
  - Total: 196
  - Density: 13.2/km^{2} (34.2/sq mi)
- Time zone: UTC+1 (CET)
  - Summer (DST): UTC+2 (CEST)
- Postal code: 270 23
- Website: www.branov.cz

Branov is a municipality and village in Rakovník District in the Central Bohemian Region of the Czech Republic. It has about 200 inhabitants.

== Etymology ==
The name Branov is derived from the personal name Bran, meaning "Bran's (court)".

== Geography ==
Branov is located about 13 kilometres (8 mi) southeast of Rakovník and 35 km (22 mi) west of Prague. Most of the municipal territory lies in the Křivoklát Highlands, but the northern part extends into the Plasy Uplands. The highest point is the hill Vysoký Tok at 546 m (1,791 ft) above sea level. The municipality is situated on the right bank of the Berounka River, which forms its northern border, and entirely within the Křivoklátsko Protected Landscape Area.

== History ==
The first written mention of Branov is from 1551.

== Demographics ==
Historical population

Year	Pop.	±%
1869	447	—
1880	504	+12.8%
1890	564	+11.9%
1900	561	−0.5%
1910	530	−5.5%

Year	Pop.	±%
1921	523	−1.3%
1930	523	+0.0%
1950	363	−30.6%
1961	347	−4.4%
1970	305	−12.1%

Year	Pop.	±%
1980	270	−11.5%
1991	256	−5.2%
2001	215	−16.0%
2011	202	−6.0%
2021	207	+2.5%

Source: Censuses

== Transport ==
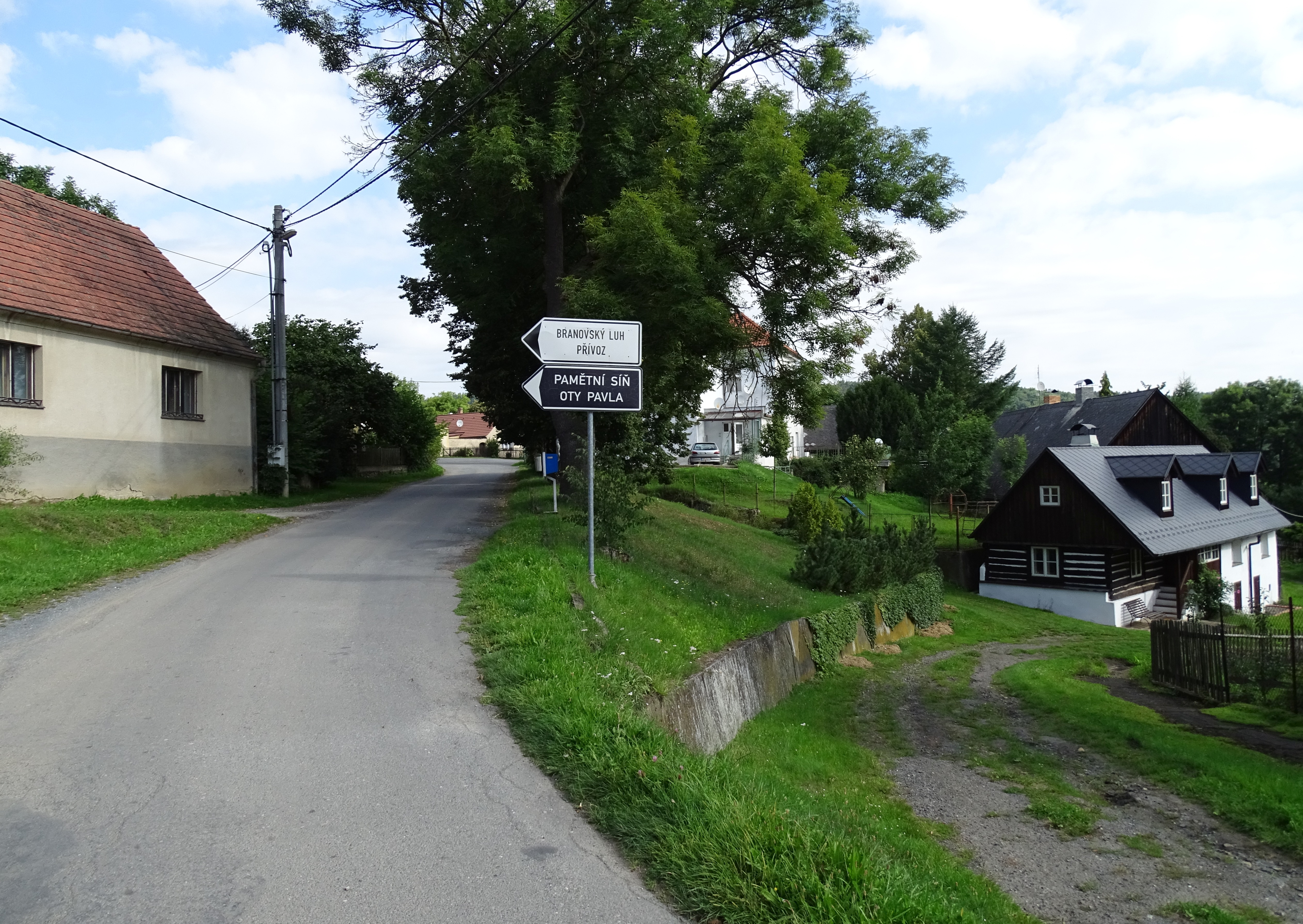
Main street

There are no railways or major roads passing through the municipality.

== Sights ==
Among Branov's protected cultural monuments are two wooden barns from the turn of the 18th and 19th centuries, a homestead formed by wooden buildings from the 18th–19th centuries and the archaeological site of a gord called Zpropadený zámek.
