= Poděvousy =

- Municipality
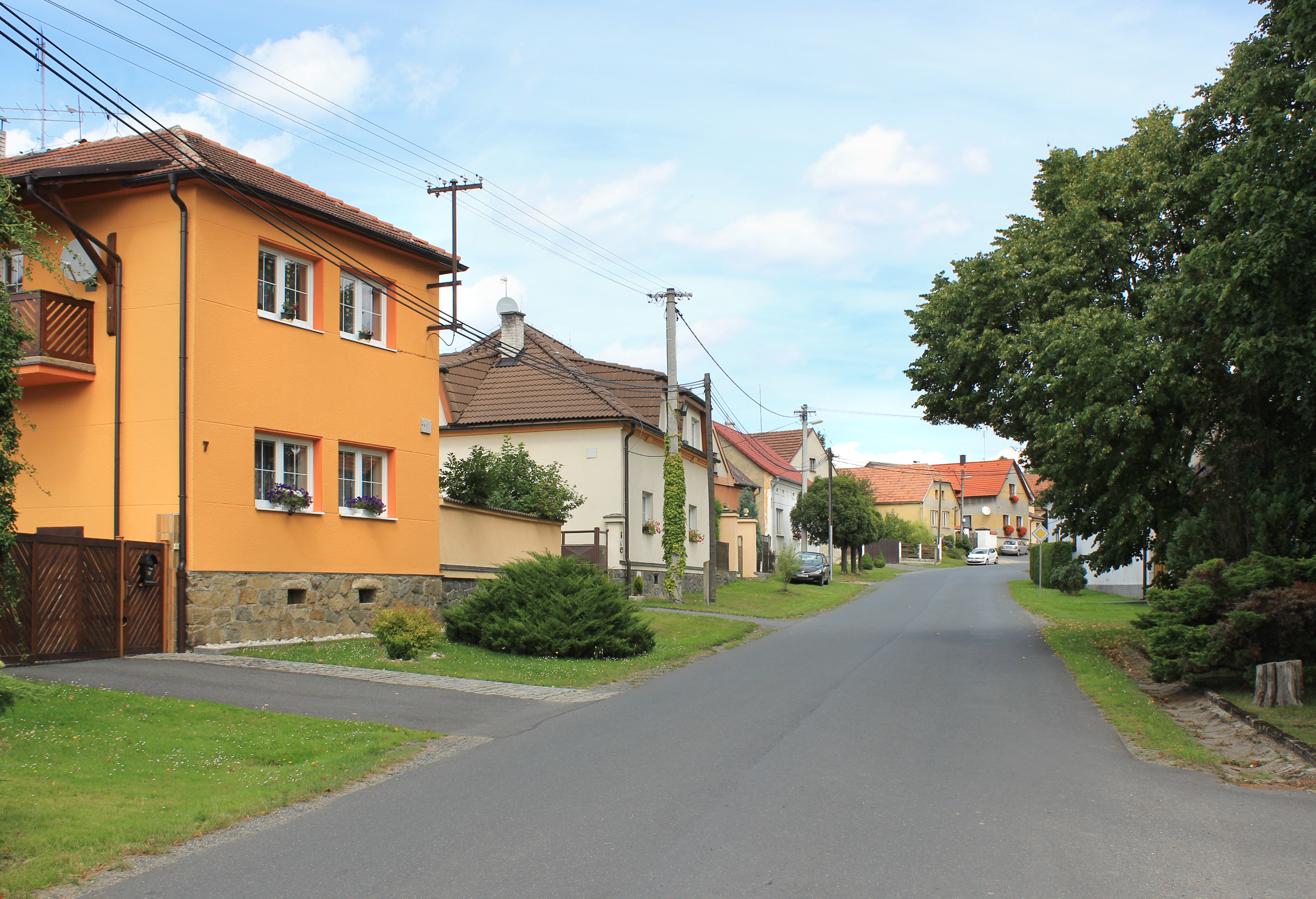
- Main street

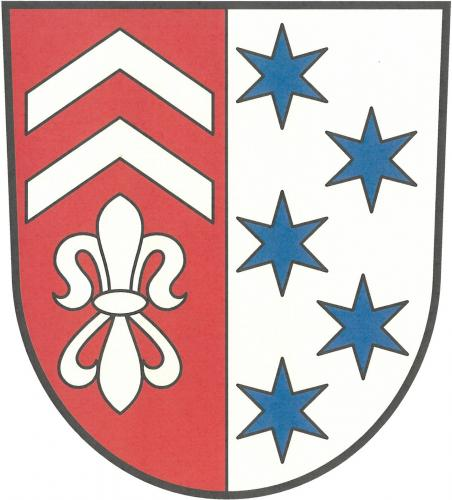
- Coat of arms

- Location in the Czech Republic
- Coordinates: 49°31′39″N 13°7′52″E
- Country: Czech Republic
- Region: Plzeň
- District: Domažlice
- First mentioned: 1115

Area
  - Total: 2.73 km^{2} (1.05 sq mi)
- Elevation: 447 m (1,467 ft)

Population (2026-01-01)
  - Total: 243
  - Density: 89.0/km^{2} (231/sq mi)
- Time zone: UTC+1 (CET)
  - Summer (DST): UTC+2 (CEST)
- Postal code: 345 61
- Website: www.podevousy.cz

Poděvousy is a municipality and village in Domažlice District in the Plzeň Region of the Czech Republic. It has about 200 inhabitants.

== Etymology ==
The name is derived from poděvous, which is an old Czech word for a person who pohodil vousy ("shed his beard"). So it designated a village of shaved people.

== Geography ==
Poděvousy is located about 17 kilometres (11 mi) northeast of Domažlice and 27 km (17 mi) southwest of Plzeň. It lies on the border between the Švihov Highlands and Plasy Uplands. The highest point is at 476 m (1,562 ft) above sea level.

== History ==
The first written mention of Poděvousy is from 1115.

== Demographics ==
Historical population

Year	Pop.	±%
1869	346	—
1880	348	+0.6%
1890	368	+5.7%
1900	396	+7.6%
1910	429	+8.3%

Year	Pop.	±%
1921	484	+12.8%
1930	422	−12.8%
1950	360	−14.7%
1961	357	−0.8%
1970	335	−6.2%

Year	Pop.	±%
1980	293	−12.5%
1991	248	−15.4%
2001	258	+4.0%
2011	226	−12.4%
2021	231	+2.2%

Source: Censuses

== Transport ==
There are no railways or major roads passing through the municipality.

== Sights ==
The only protected cultural monument in the municipality is a rural house from the first half of the 19th century. A landmark is the Chapel of Saint John of Nepomuk in the centre of Poděvousy.
