= Všetaty =

Všetaty may refer to places in the Czech Republic:

- Všetaty (Mělník District), a market town in the Central Bohemian Region
- Všetaty (Rakovník District), a municipality and village in the Central Bohemian Region
