= Lahovice =

- Cadastral Area of Prague
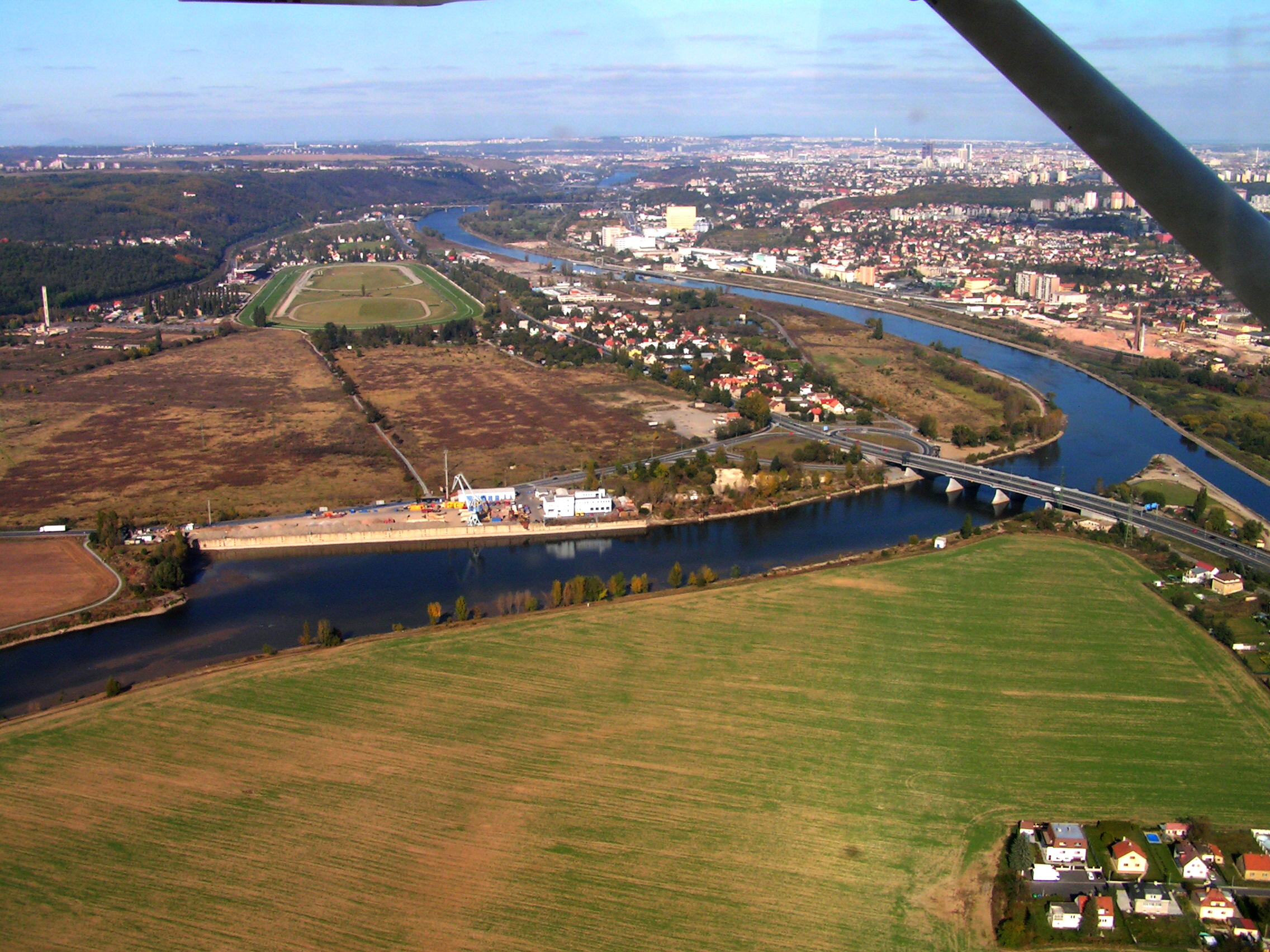
- Confluence of Berounka and Vltava rivers at Lahovice

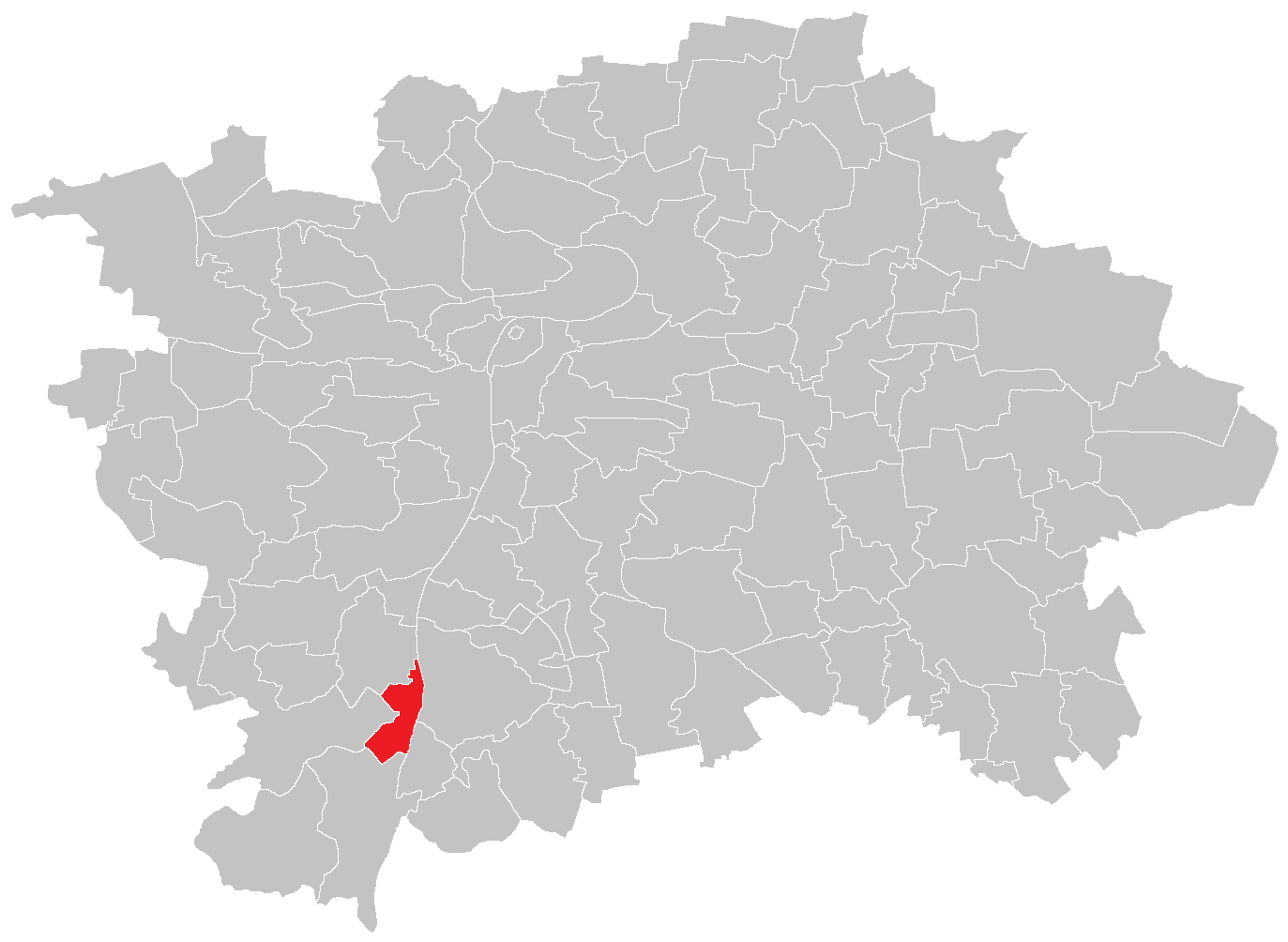
- Location of Lahovice in Prague
- Coordinates: 50°59′16″N 14°23′49″E
- Country: Czech Republic
- Region: Prague
- District: Prague-Zbraslav

Area
  - Total: 2.03 km^{2} (0.78 sq mi)

Population (2021)
  - Total: 381
  - Density: 188/km^{2} (486/sq mi)
- Time zone: UTC+1 (CET)
  - Summer (DST): UTC+2 (CEST)
- Postal code: 159 00

Lahovice (German: Lahowitz) is a cadastral district of Prague, Czech Republic. In 2015, it had 330 inhabitants. There is a confluence of the Berounka and Vltava rivers in Lahovice. There are two settlements in the cadastral district: Lahovice and Lahovičky.

== Demographics ==
Historical population

Year	Pop.	±%
1869	385	—
1880	352	−8.6%
1890	420	+19.3%
1900	401	−4.5%
1910	394	−1.7%
1921	384	−2.5%
1930	628	+63.5%
1950	656	+4.5%

Year	Pop.	±%
1961	592	−9.8%
1970	539	−9.0%
1980	561	+4.1%
1991	379	−32.4%
2001	390	+2.9%
2011	472	+21.0%
2021	381	−19.3%

Source: Censuses
