= Zdeněk Bláha =

Czech composer and musician (1929–2025)

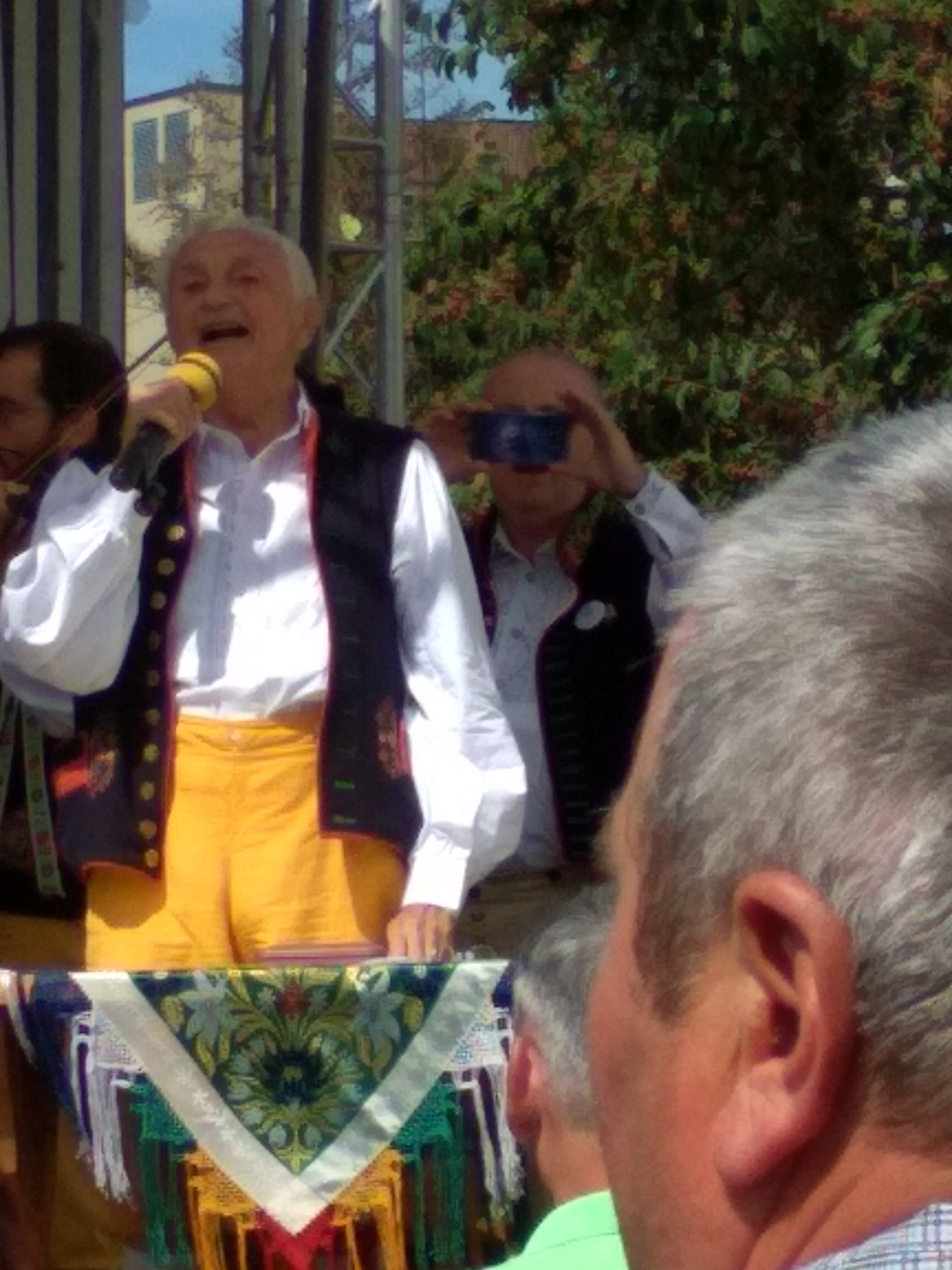
Zdeněk Bláha

Zdeněk Bláha (27 December 1929 – 21 October 2025) was a Czech composer, editor and bagpiper.

== Life and career ==
Bláha was born in Horní Bříza on 27 December 1929.

From 1955 he worked as a music editor for folklore at the Czech Radio Plzeň. He was the founder and presenter of the folklore program Hrají a zpívají Plzeňáci (Pilsners Play and Sing), which was broadcast from 1958 to 1998. In 1958, he founded the folklore ensemble Úsměv in Horní Bříza which soon became one of the best ensembles processing Czech folklore. In 1955 he co-founded Konrádyho dudácká muzika (Konrády's Bagpipe Band) in Domažlice.

In 1986, he was awarded the Czechoslovak Radio Award.

Bláha died on 21 October 2025, at the age of 95.
