= Všetaty (Rakovník District) =

- Municipality
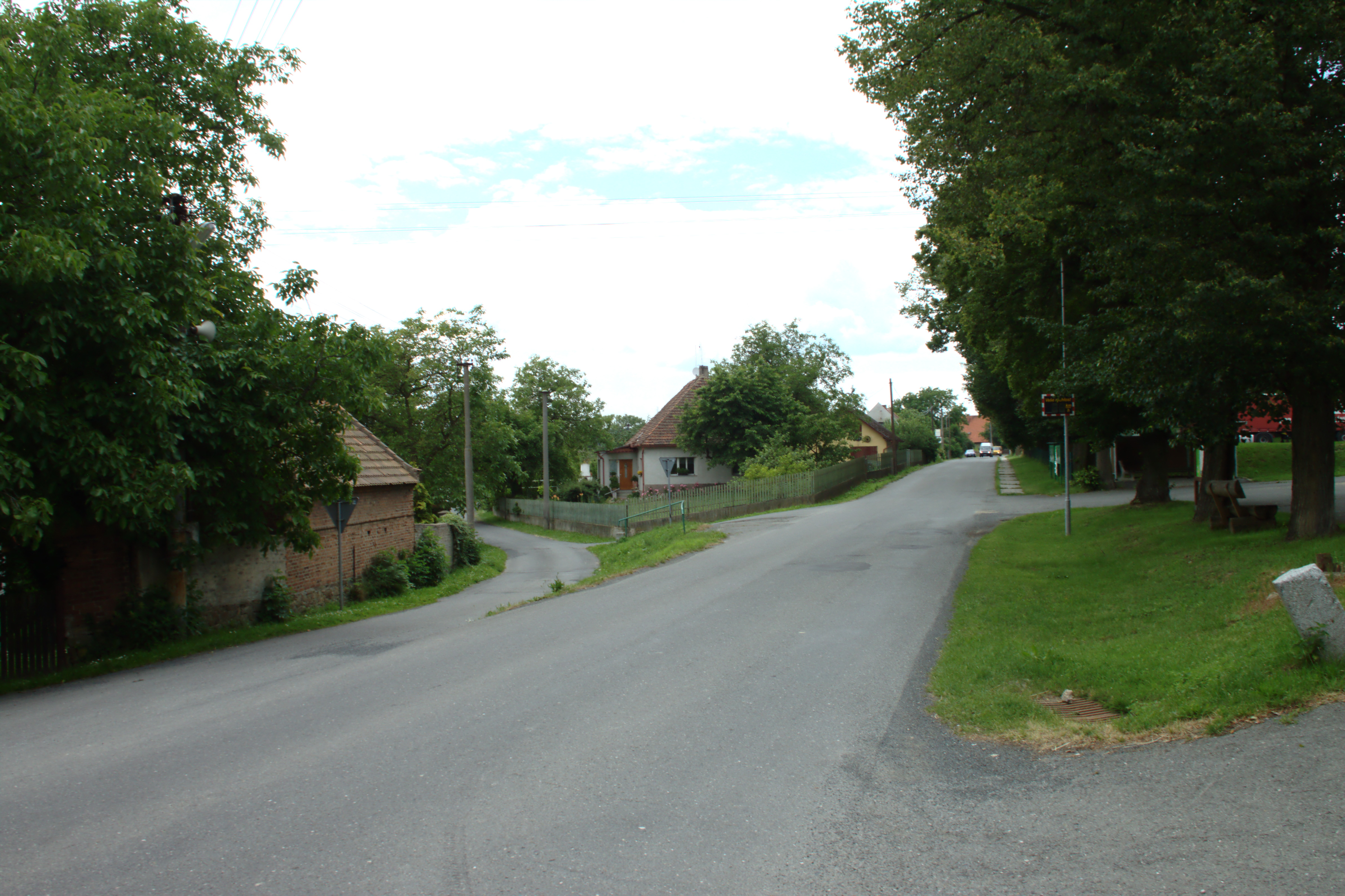
- Main road

- Flag Coat of arms

- Location in the Czech Republic
- Coordinates: 50°2′46″N 13°45′28″E
- Country: Czech Republic
- Region: Central Bohemian
- District: Rakovník
- First mentioned: 1337

Area
  - Total: 6.01 km^{2} (2.32 sq mi)
- Elevation: 403 m (1,322 ft)

Population (2026-01-01)
  - Total: 310
  - Density: 52/km^{2} (130/sq mi)
- Time zone: UTC+1 (CET)
  - Summer (DST): UTC+2 (CEST)
- Postal code: 270 21
- Website: www.obec-vsetaty.cz

Všetaty (Czech pronunciation: [ˈfʂɛtaty]) is a municipality and village in Rakovník District in the Central Bohemian Region of the Czech Republic. It has about 300 inhabitants.

== Etymology ==
The name is derived from the Old Czech words vsje ('all') and taty ('thieves'). It was an unflattering nickname of the village.

== Geography ==
Všetaty is located about 6 kilometres (4 mi) south of Rakovník and 41 km (25 mi) west of Prague. It lies in the Plasy Uplands. The highest point is at 475 m (1,558 ft) above sea level. The stream Všetatský potok flows through the municipality and supplies here a system of five small fishponds. Most of the municipal territory lies within the Křivoklátsko Protected Landscape Area.

== History ==
The first written mention of Všetaty is from 1337. It was the cnetre of a small estate and its owners often changed. In 1598, the estate was sold to the town of Rakovník. During the Thirty Years' War, the village and the local fortress were burned down. In 1651, only 25 inhabitants lived in the village. In 1754, Všetaty was purchased by the Fürstenberg family and annexed to the Křivoklát estate.

== Demographics ==
Historical population

Year	Pop.	±%
1869	498	—
1880	488	−2.0%
1890	541	+10.9%
1900	565	+4.4%
1910	572	+1.2%

Year	Pop.	±%
1921	588	+2.8%
1930	533	−9.4%
1950	368	−31.0%
1961	414	+12.5%
1970	353	−14.7%

Year	Pop.	±%
1980	339	−4.0%
1991	310	−8.6%
2001	311	+0.3%
2011	310	−0.3%
2021	316	+1.9%

Source: Censuses

== Transport ==
There are no railways or major roads passing through the municipality.

== Sights ==
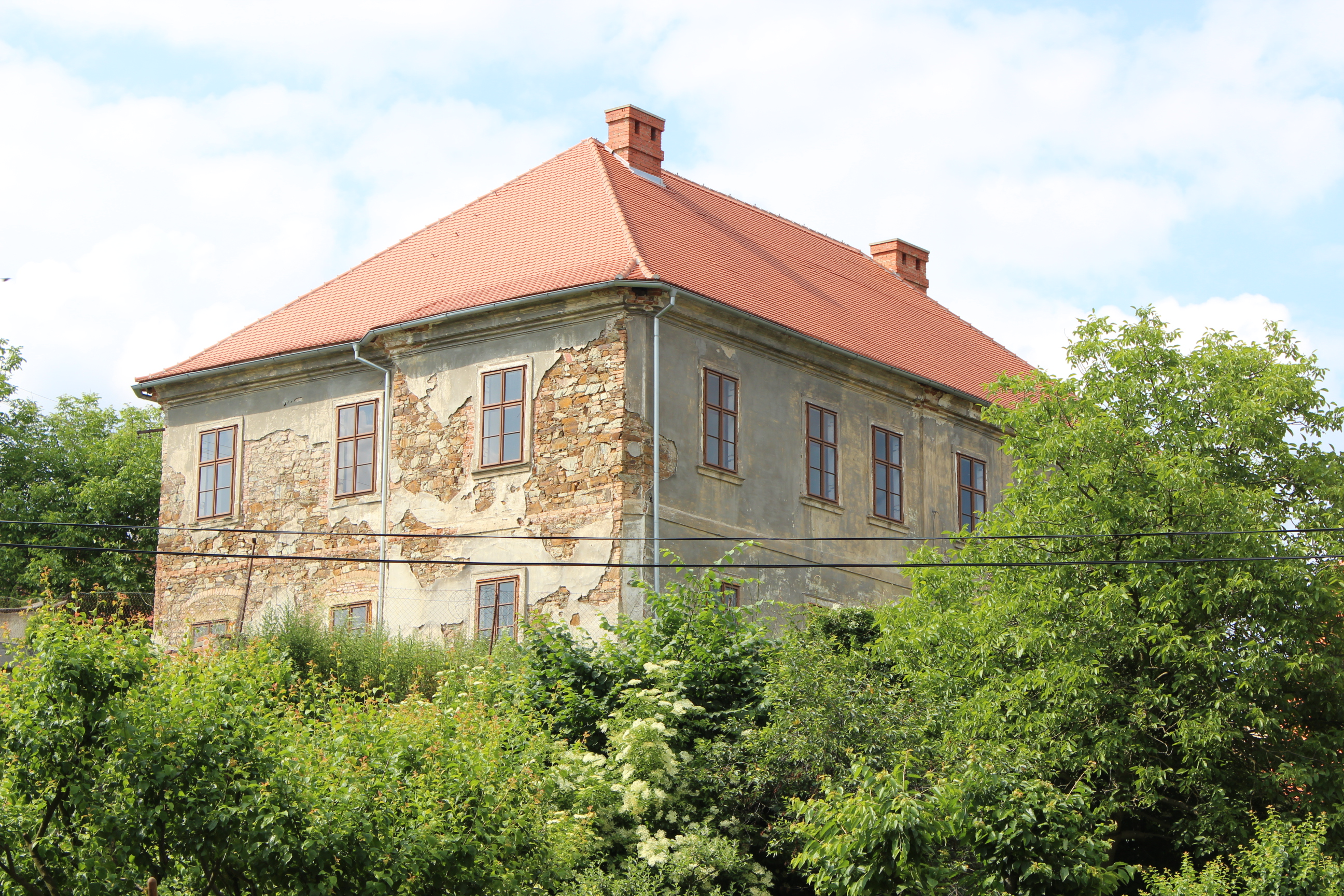
Všetaty Castle

The main landmark of Všetaty is the Všetaty Castle. It was built in the Baroque style in the second half of the 18th century, on the site of a disappeared Gothic fortress from the 15th century. Today the building is unused.
