= Viktor Stretti =

Czech etcher and lithographer (1878–1957)

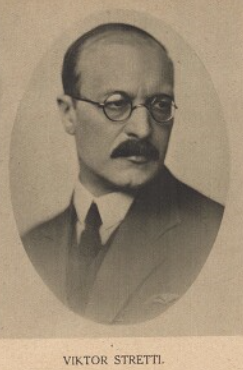
Stretti in 1928

Viktor Stretti, born Vítězslav Otakar Stretti (7 April 1878 in Plasy – 3 March 1957 in Dobříš) was a Czech etcher and lithographer. His brother was the etcher Jaromír Stretti-Zamponi.
