= Mže =

River in the Czech Republic and Germany

Mže Mies
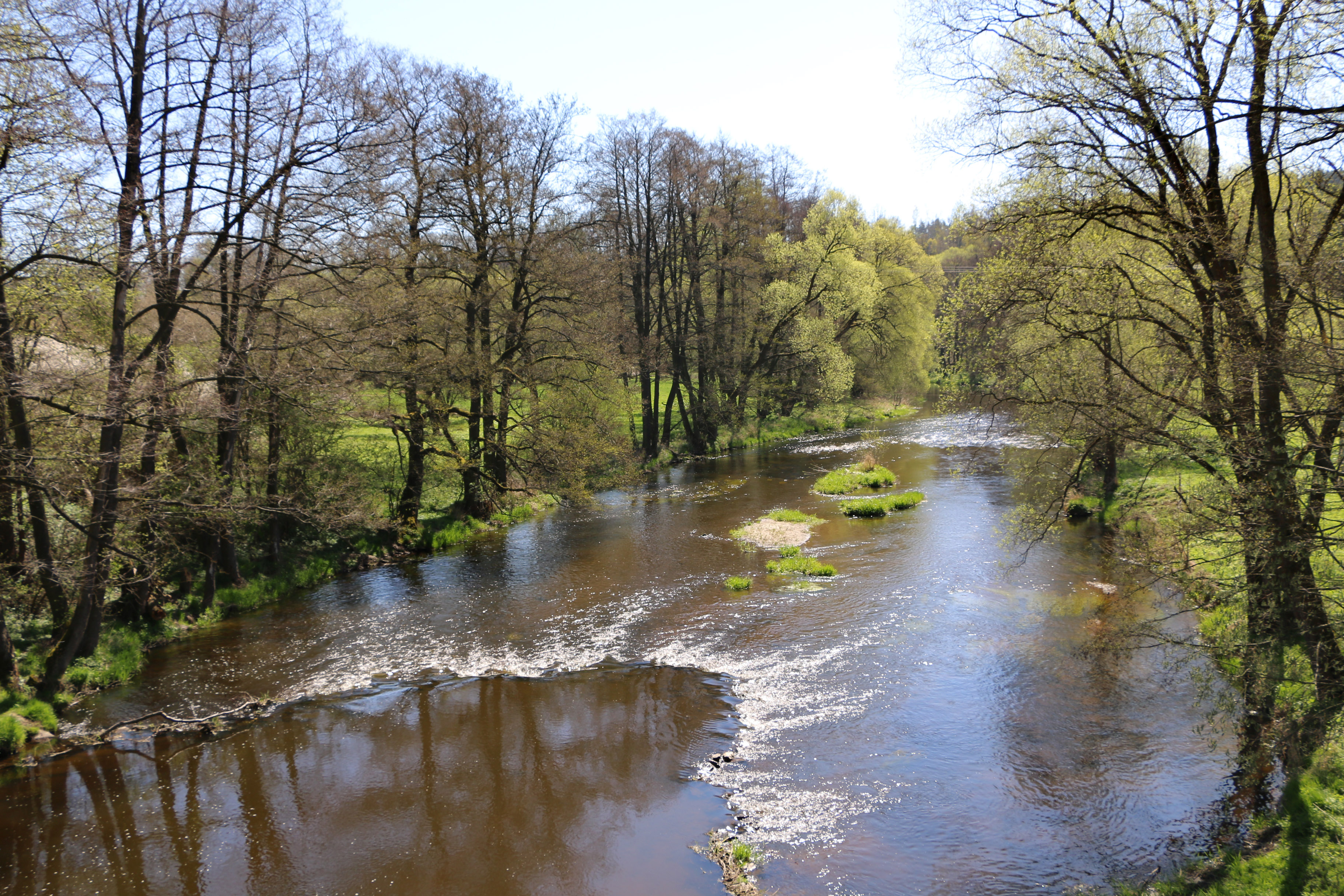
- The Mže in Stříbro-Milíkov

Location
- Countries: Czech Republic; Germany
- States/ Regions: Bavaria; Plzeň; Central Bohemian

Physical characteristics
- Source
  - location: Mähring, Upper Palatine Forest
  - coordinates: 49°51′10″N 12°28′1″E
  - elevation: 726 m (2,382 ft)
- Mouth
  - location: Berounka
  - coordinates: 49°45′14″N 13°23′26″E
  - elevation: 301 m (988 ft)
- Length: 105.1 km (65.3 mi)
- Basin size: 1,828.6 km^{2} (706.0 sq mi)
- Discharge
  - average: 8.27 m^{3}/s (292 cu ft/s) near estuary

Basin features
- Progression: Berounka→ Vltava→ Elbe→ North Sea

The Mže (Czech pronunciation: [ˈmʒɛ]; German: Mies) is a river in the Czech Republic and shortly in Germany. It flows through Bavaria in Germany and through the Plzeň and Central Bohemian regions. It is the upper course of the Berounka, but usually is considered a separate river. Until its confluence with the Radbuza in Plzeň, when it further continues as Berounka, the Mže is 105.1 km (65.3 mi) long.

== Etymology ==
According to one theory, the name is of Slavic origin and is derived from the verb mžít (i.e. 'drizzle'). According to the second theory, the name is of Germanic origin and is connected with the root mighia ('urine', meaning "smelly water"). There is also a theory that the name is of Celtic origin, derived from the word mŏsā (meaning 'marsh', 'swamp') and related to the names of the rivers Mieß, Maas and Mosel.

Originally, the entire stream including the Berounka was called Mže (Latin: Misa, German: Mies) and the name first appeared in the 12th century in Chronica Boemorum. The name was written as Mse, Msa and Mzye.

From the 17th century, the lower course started to be named Berounka, but the name Mže still appeared as a name for the entire stream at the end of the 19th century. In order to avoid confusion, an initiative was created in 2008 to rename the lower course back to the historical name Mže, but it was unsuccessful due to the strongly adopted current name.

== Characteristic ==
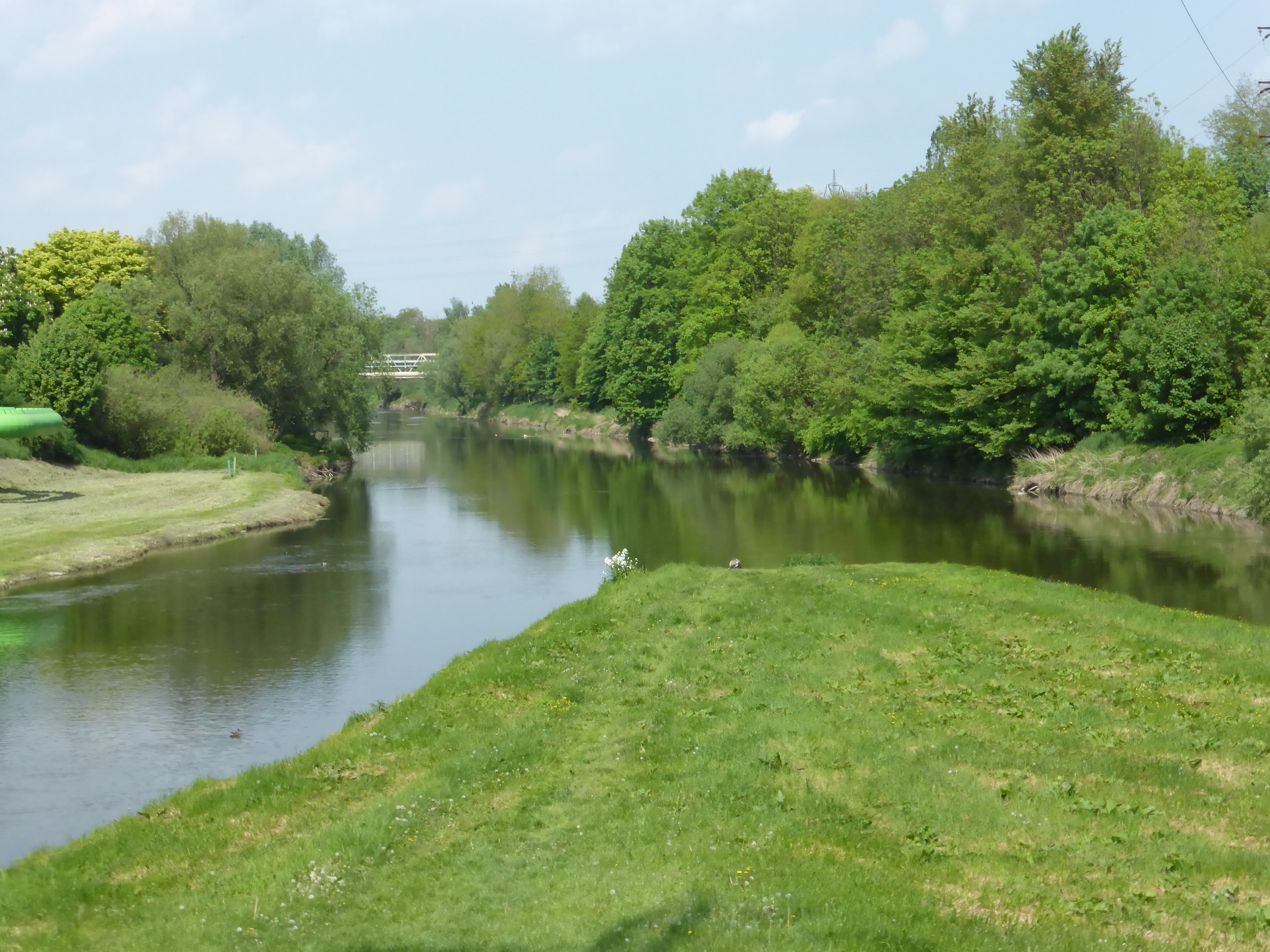
Confluence of the Mže and Radbuza

From a water management point of view, the Berounka and Mže are two different rivers with separate numbering of river kilometres. The Mže originates in the territory of Mähring in the Upper Palatine Forest at an elevation of 726 m (2,382 ft), forms the state boundary for a short distance of 1.4 km (0.9 mi) and then flows to Plzeň, where it merges with the Radbuza River at an elevation of 301 m (988 ft) and continues as Berounka. It is 105.1 km (65.3 mi) long, of which 2.3 km (1.4 mi) is in Germany. In the Czech Republic, it is 102.8 km (63.9 mi) long (including the section at the state border), which would make it one of the 25 longest rivers in the country, even if taken separately from the Berounka. Its drainage basin has an area of 1,828.6 km^{2} (706.0 sq mi), of which 1,792.3 km^{2} (692.0 sq mi) is in the Czech Republic.

The longest tributaries of the Mže are:

Tributary	Length (km)	River km	Side
Kosový potok	46.4	67.3	left
Úhlavka	41.4	44.5	right
Úterský potok	35.8	31.3	left
Hamerský potok / Hammerbach	33.8	75.5	left
Vejprnický potok	23.2	2.5	right
Sedlišťský potok	20.8	80.7	right
Žebrácký potok	13.8	27.2	left

== Course ==
The most notable settlements on the river are the towns of Tachov and Stříbro and the city of Plzeň.

== Bodies of water ==
There are two reservoirs on the Mže: Hracholusky with an area of 352 ha (870 acres) and Lučina with an area of 86 ha (210 acres). There are 198 bodies of water larger than 1 ha in the basin area.

== Fauna ==
The upper course of the river is home to a population of Eurasian beaver.

== Tourism ==
The Mže is suitable for river tourism and belongs to the rivers suitable for less experienced paddlers. However, it is often not passable in the summer with higher temperatures and lower rainfall.
