= Česká Bříza =

- Municipality
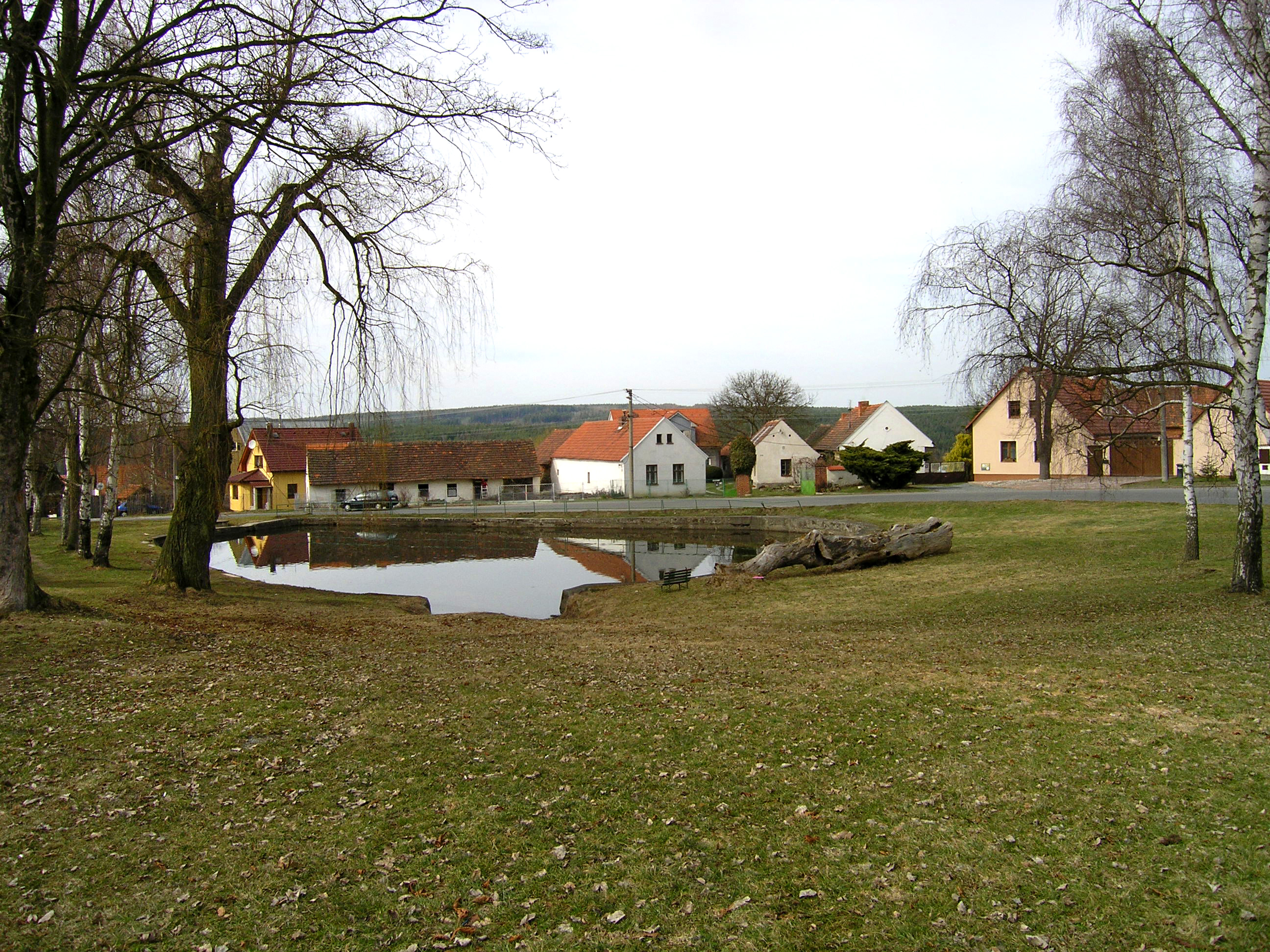
- Centre of the village with a pond

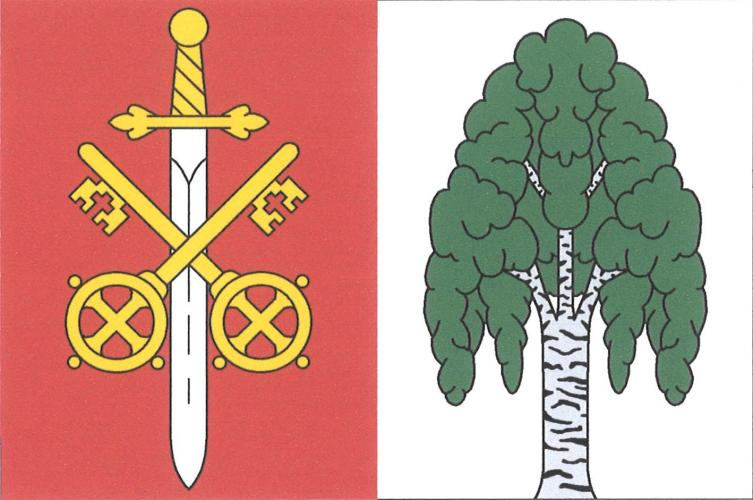
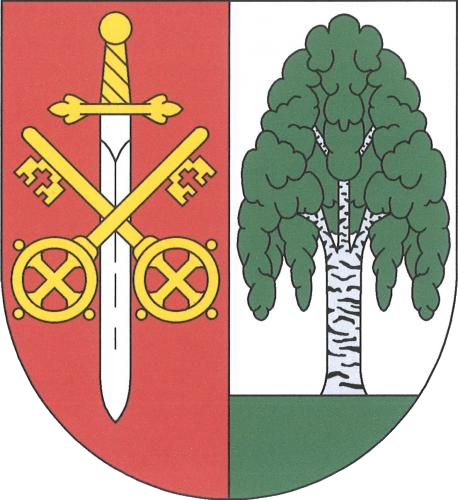
- Flag Coat of arms

- Location in the Czech Republic
- Coordinates: 49°49′43″N 13°25′47″E
- Country: Czech Republic
- Region: Plzeň
- District: Plzeň-North
- First mentioned: 1401

Area
  - Total: 4.53 km^{2} (1.75 sq mi)
- Elevation: 385 m (1,263 ft)

Population (2026-01-01)
  - Total: 579
  - Density: 128/km^{2} (331/sq mi)
- Time zone: UTC+1 (CET)
  - Summer (DST): UTC+2 (CEST)
- Postal code: 330 11
- Website: www.ceska-briza.cz

Česká Bříza (until 1948 Německá Bříza; German: Deutsch Brzis) is a municipality and village in Plzeň-North District in the Plzeň Region of the Czech Republic. It has about 600 inhabitants.

Česká Bříza lies approximately 10 kilometres (6 mi) north-east of Plzeň and 77 kilometres (48 mi) west of Prague.

== Demographics ==
Historical population
Year	Pop.	±%
1869	453	—
1880	571	+26.0%
1890	643	+12.6%
1900	619	−3.7%
1910	698	+12.8%
1921	681	−2.4%
1930	697	+2.3%
1950	600	−13.9%
1961	576	−4.0%
1970	516	−10.4%
1980	480	−7.0%
1991	457	−4.8%
2001	445	−2.6%
2011	527	+18.4%
2021	593	+12.5%
Source: Censuses
