= Roztoky, Svidník District =

Roztoky
- Municipality
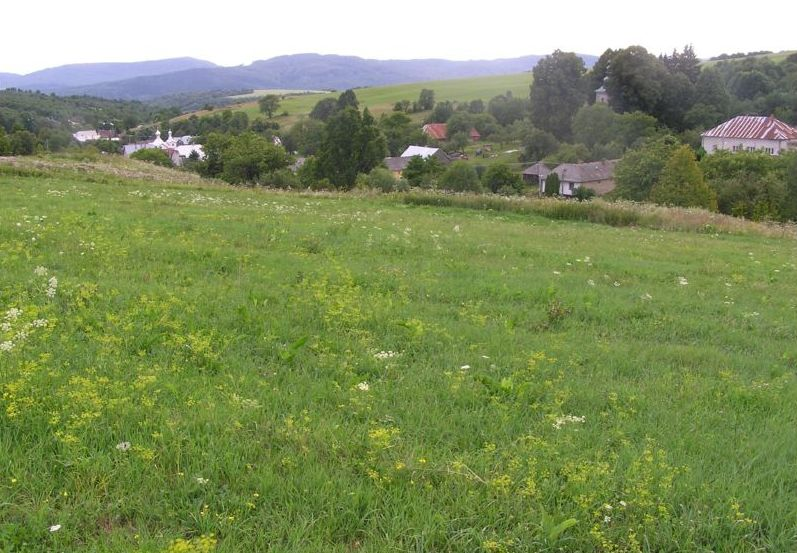

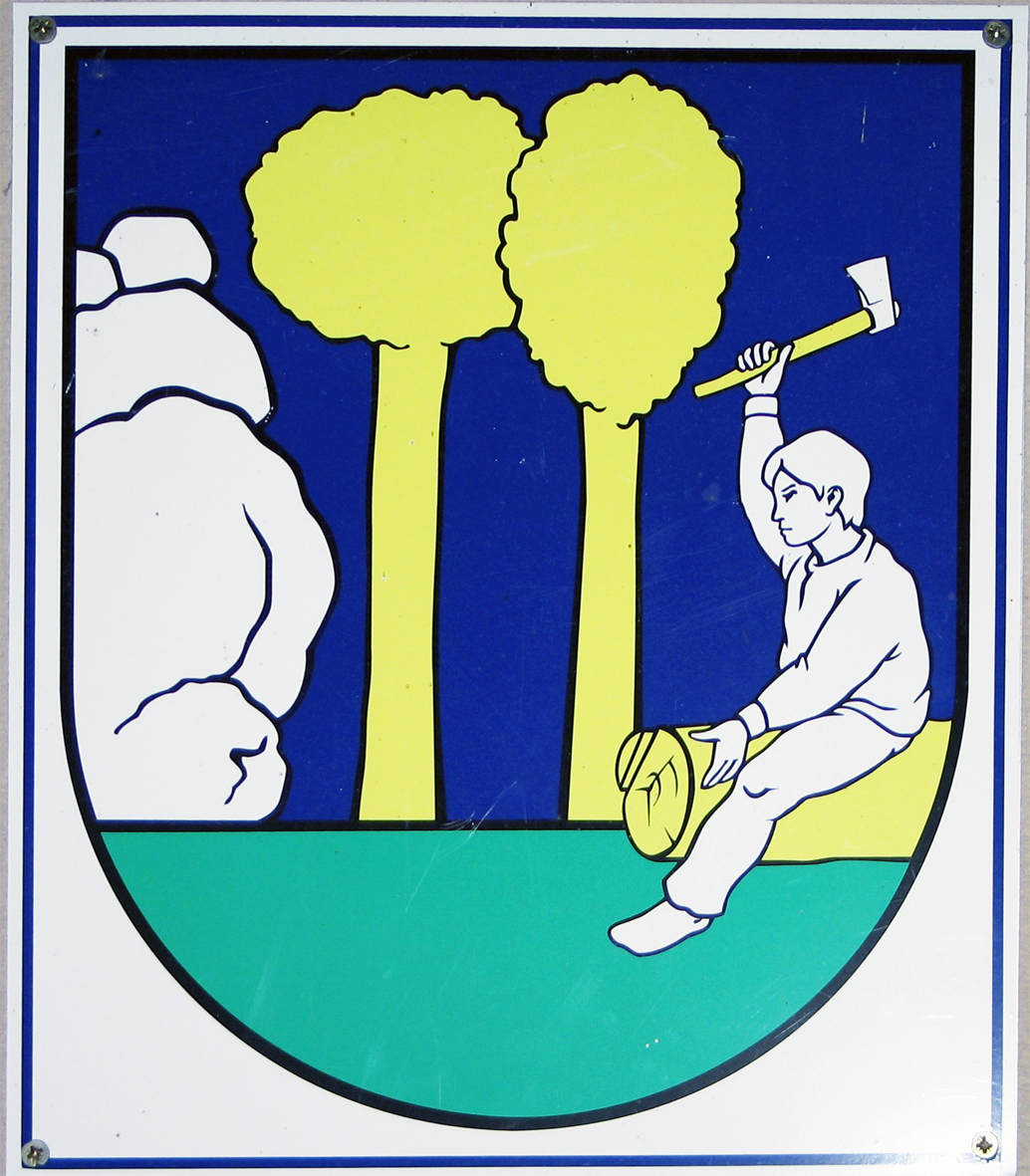
- Flag Coat of arms

- Location of Roztoky in the Prešov Region Location of Roztoky in Slovakia
- Coordinates: 49°23′N 21°29′E
- Country: Slovakia
- Region: Prešov Region
- District: Svidník District
- First mentioned: 1435

Government
  - Mayor: Jaroslav Drda (TOP 09)

Area
  - Total: 11.27 km^{2} (4.35 sq mi)
- Elevation: 366 m (1,201 ft)

Population (2025)
  - Total: 458
- Time zone: UTC+1 (CET)
  - Summer (DST): UTC+2 (CEST)
- Postal code: 901 1
- Area code: +421 54
- Vehicle registration plate (until 2022): SK
- Website: www.roztoky.sk

Roztoky (Hungarian: Végrosztoka) is a village and municipality in Svidník District in the Prešov Region of north-eastern Slovakia.

== History ==
In historical records the village was first mentioned in 1435.

== Geography ==
The municipality lies at an altitude of 366 metres (1,201 ft) and covers an area of 11.27 km^{2} (4.35 sq mi) (2025).

== Population ==
Population statistic (10 years)
Year	1995	2005	2015	2025
Count	221	272	399	458
Difference		+23.07%	+46.69%	+14.78%

Population statistic
Year	2024	2025
Count	454	458
Difference		+0.88%

It has a population of 458 people (31 December 2025).

=== Ethnicity ===
Census 2021 (1+ %)
Ethnicity	Number	Fraction
Slovak	255	58.48%
Romani	200	45.87%
Rusyn	122	27.98%
Russian	15	3.44%
Total	436	

In year 2021 was 436 people by ethnicity 255 as Slovak, 200 as Romani, 122 as Rusyn, 15 as Russian, 4 as Not found out, 3 as Czech and 3 as Ukrainian.

Note on population: The difference values of population numbers in the table "Population statistic" and in the sections "Ethnicity" & "Religion" is caused by the use of various statistical methods.

=== Religion ===
Census 2021 (1+ %)
Religion	Number	Fraction
Eastern Orthodox Church	331	75.92%
None	47	10.78%
Jehovah's Witnesses	18	4.13%
Greek Catholic Church	17	3.9%
Roman Catholic Church	11	2.52%
Not found out	10	2.29%
Total	436	

In year 2021 was 436 people by religion 331 from Eastern Orthodox Church, 47 from None, 18 from Jehovah's Witnesses, 17 from Greek Catholic Church, 11 from Roman Catholic Church, 10 from Not found out, 1 from Other and 1 from Evangelical Church.
