= Plasy Uplands =

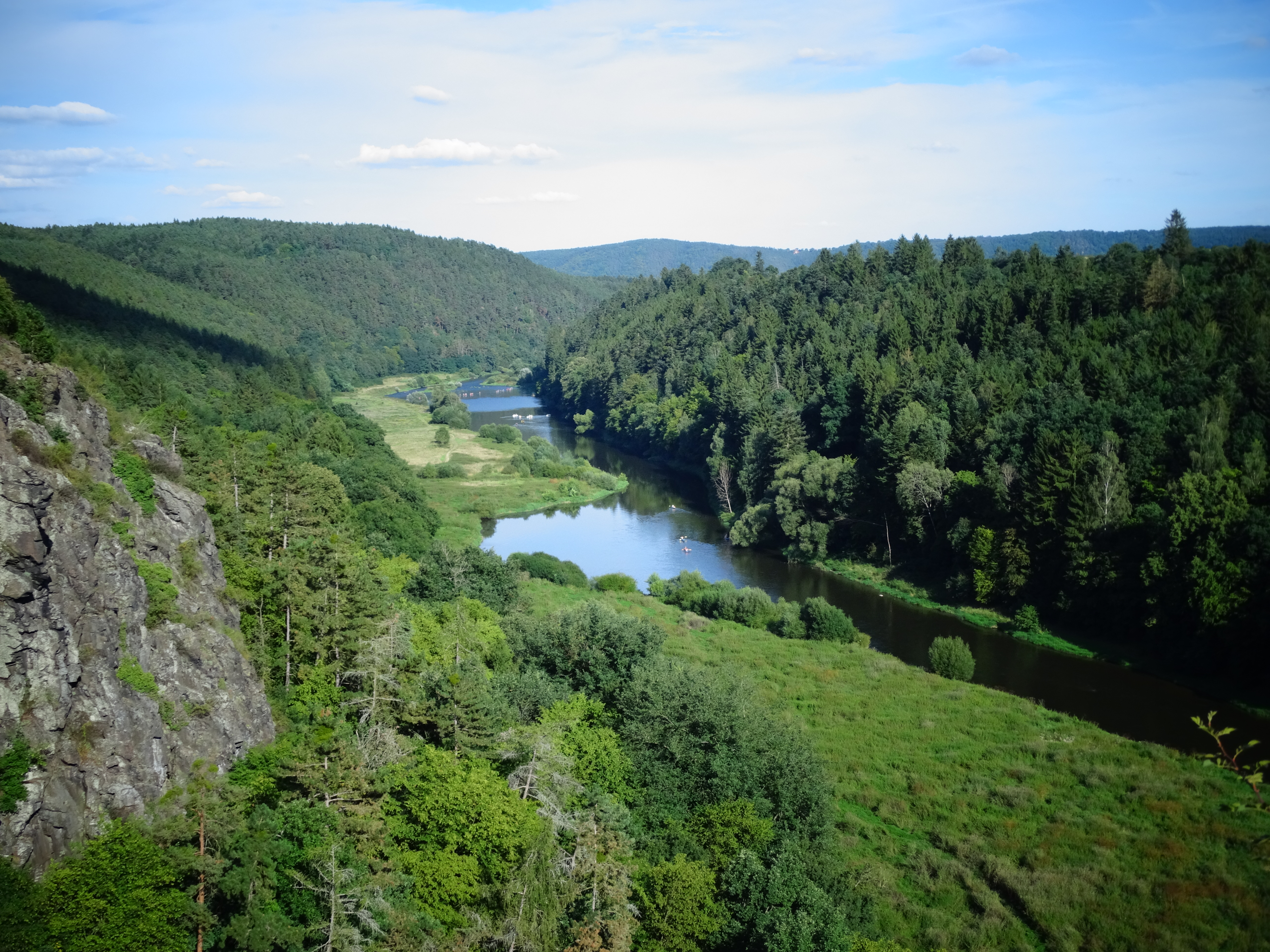
- Valley of the Berounka River

Highest point
- Peak: Vlčí hora
- Elevation: 704 m (2,310 ft)

Dimensions
- Length: 85 km (53 mi)
- Area: 2,180 km^{2} (840 mi^{2})

Geography
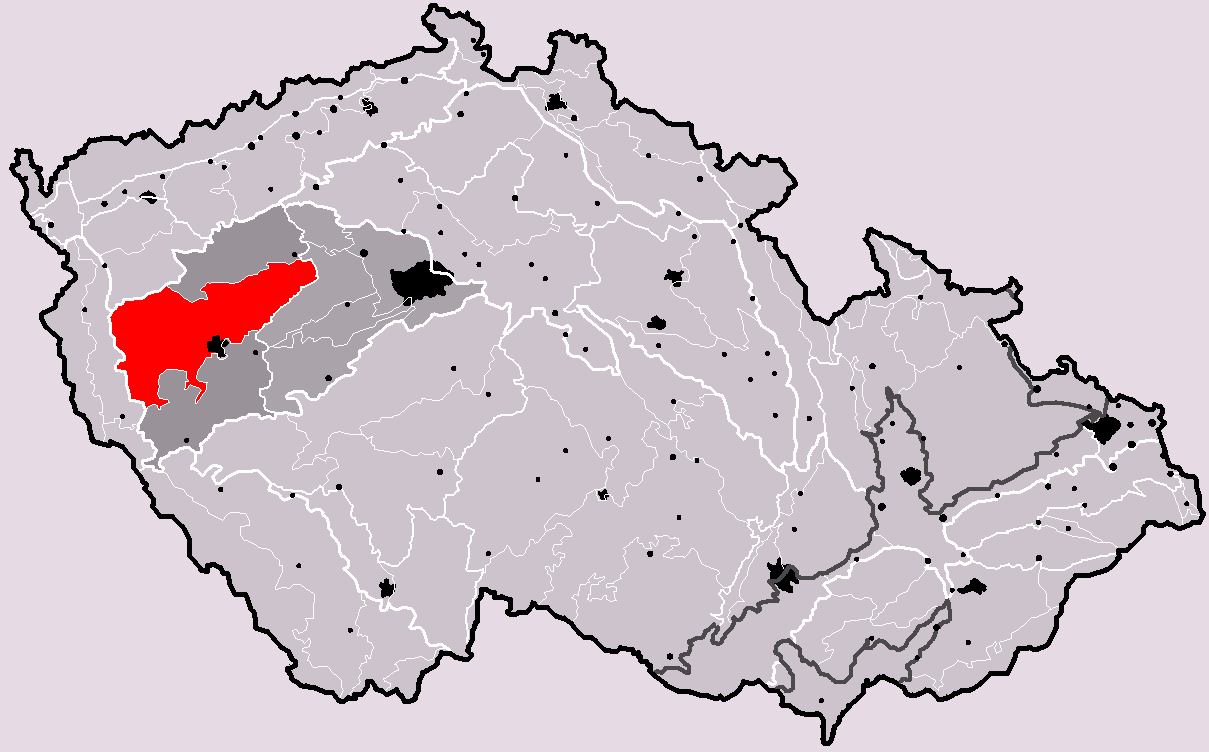
- Plasy Uplands in the geomorphological system of the Czech Republic
- Country: Czech Republic
- Regions: Plzeň, Central Bohemian
- Range coordinates: 49°48′N 13°15′E
- Parent range: Plzeň Uplands

The Plasy Uplands (Czech: Plaská pahorkatina) are uplands and a geomorphological mesoregion of the Czech Republic. It is located in the Plzeň and Central Bohemian regions and belongs to the largest mesoregions in the country. The axis of the territory is formed by the Berounka/Mže River.

== Geomorphology ==
The Plasy Uplands is a mesoregion of the Plzeň Uplands within the Bohemian Massif. The relief is characterised by extensive remnants of Neogene leveled surfaces, structural denudation depressions and river terraces. The uplands are further subdivided into the microregions of Stříbro Uplands, Kaznějov Uplands, Plzeň Valley and Kralovice Uplands.

There are a lot of medium-high hills. The highest peaks are located in the western part of the territory. The highest peaks of the Plasy Uplands are:

- Vlčí hora, 704 m (2,310 ft)
- Hradišťský vrch, 633 m (2,077 ft)
- Racovský vrch, 619 m (2,031 ft)
- Chlum, 610 m (2,000 ft)
- Rozsocha, 600 m (2,000 ft)
- Krmníky, 597 m (1,959 ft)
- Skupečský vrch, 596 m (1,955 ft)
- Citeř, 589 m (1,932 ft)
- Vinice, 589 m (1,932 ft)
- Tříslovec, 589 m (1,932 ft)

== Geography ==
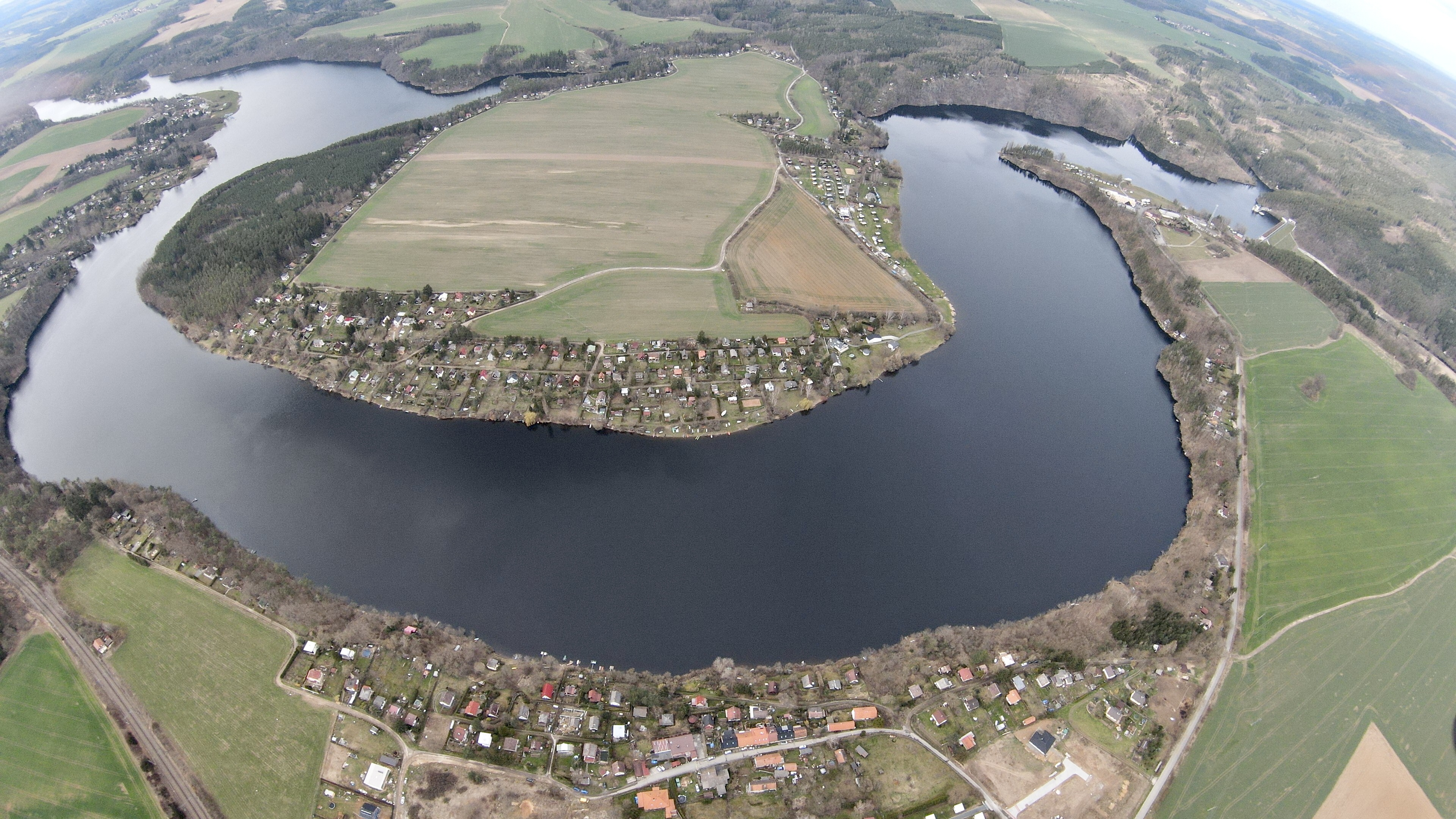
Hracholusky Reservoir

The Plasy Uplands has an elongated shape from the northwest to the southeast with a length of approximately 85 km (53 mi). The uplands have an area of 2,180 square kilometres (842 sq mi) and an average elevation of 423 metres (1,388 ft).

The axis of the territory is formed by the Berounka River and its main source, the Mže River. The Radbuza flows to the Mže through the southern part of the uplands. The Střela flows to the Berounka in the north of the uplands. The largest body of water is the Hracholusky Reservoir, built on the Mže.

Most of the city of Plzeň lies within the Plasy Uplands. Other notable settlements in the uplands are Stříbro, Nýřany, Dobřany, Třemošná, Horní Bříza and also Plasy, after which the region is named.

== Geology ==
The geologically diverse bedrock is formed by weakly metamorphosed Proterozoic rocks supplemented by Variscan granitoids, by consolidated Permocarbonite and unconsolidated Tertiary sediments, and occasionally by igneous rocks from the Tertiary and Quaternary periods.

== Nature ==
The northwestern part of the Plasy Uplands is protected as the Křivoklátsko Protected Landscape Area.
