= Roztoky u Semil =

- Municipality
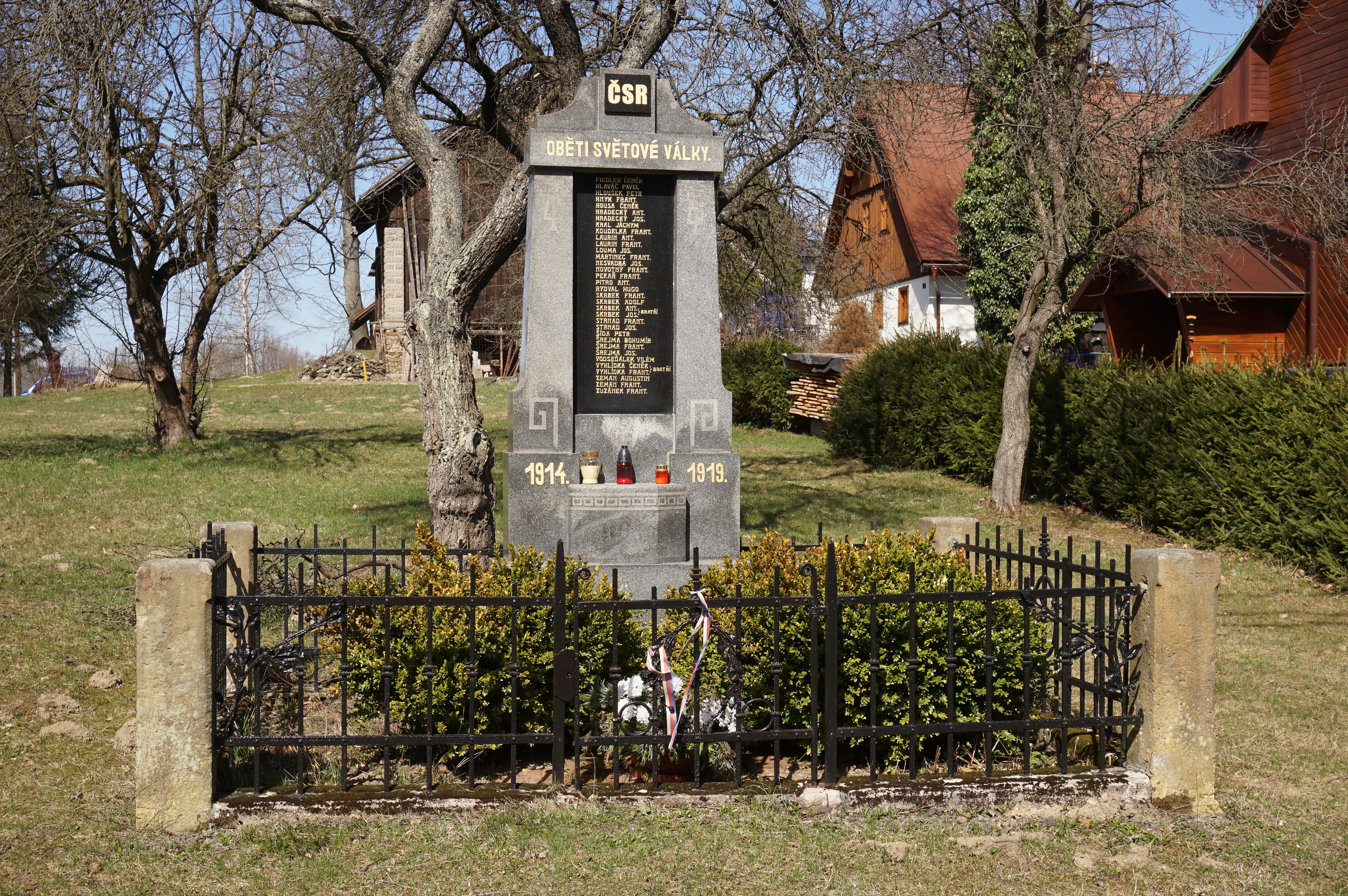
- Memorial to the victims of World War I

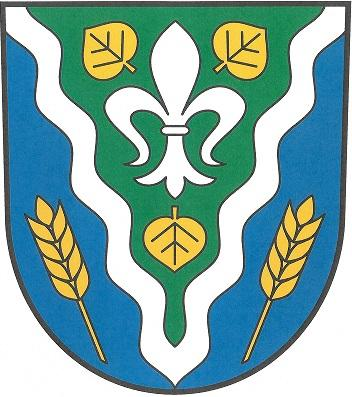
- Flag Coat of arms

- Location in the Czech Republic
- Coordinates: 50°39′31″N 15°22′18″E
- Country: Czech Republic
- Region: Liberec
- District: Semily
- First mentioned: 1356

Area
  - Total: 4.43 km^{2} (1.71 sq mi)
- Elevation: 512 m (1,680 ft)

Population (2026-01-01)
  - Total: 108
  - Density: 24.4/km^{2} (63.1/sq mi)
- Time zone: UTC+1 (CET)
  - Summer (DST): UTC+2 (CEST)
- Postal code: 513 01
- Website: www.roztokyusemil.cz

Roztoky u Semil is a municipality and village in Semily District in the Liberec Region of the Czech Republic. It has about 100 inhabitants.

== Etymology ==
The name Roztoky is derived from rozdělený tok, i.e. 'divided stream'. It is a common Czech toponym for places founded at the confluence of a small stream with a larger watercourse.

== Geography ==
Roztoky u Semil is located about 7 kilometres (4 mi) northeast of Semily and 24 km (15 mi) southeast of Liberec. It lies in a hilly landscape in the Giant Mountains Foothills. The highest point is the hill Buč at 652 m (2,139 ft) above sea level. The Vošmenda Stream flows along the western municipal border and the stream Staroveský potok flows along the eastern municipal border.

== History ==
The first written mention of Roztoky is from the period 1356–1360, when the monastery in Hradiště sold the village to Lords of Lemberk. In 1627, the estate was acquired by the Lamotte family.

== Demographics ==
Historical population

Year	Pop.	±%
1869	564	—
1880	539	−4.4%
1890	585	+8.5%
1900	562	−3.9%
1910	471	−16.2%

Year	Pop.	±%
1921	440	−6.6%
1930	462	+5.0%
1950	302	−34.6%
1961	284	−6.0%
1970	239	−15.8%

Year	Pop.	±%
1980	218	−8.8%
1991	156	−28.4%
2001	135	−13.5%
2011	128	−5.2%
2021	119	−7.0%

Source: Censuses

== Transport ==
There are no railways or major roads passing through the municipality.

== Sights ==
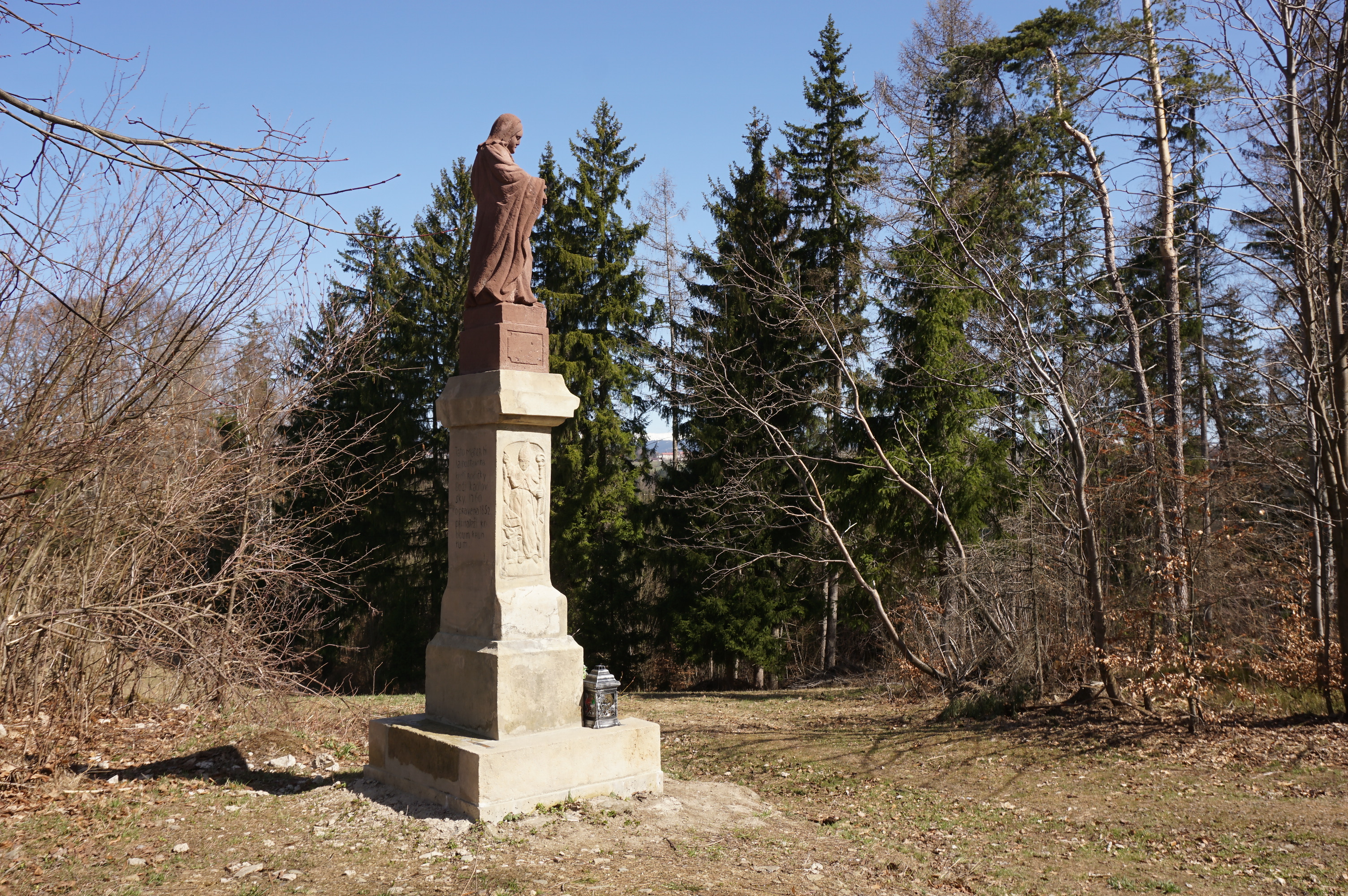
Statue of the Virgin Mary of Karlov

Among the protected cultural monuments in the municipality are four stone statues: Our Lady of the Immaculate Conception (created in 1728), Virgin Mary of Karlov (1760), Virgin Mary of Bozkov (1767), and Saint John of Nepomuk (second half of the 19th century).
