= Plasy =

- Town
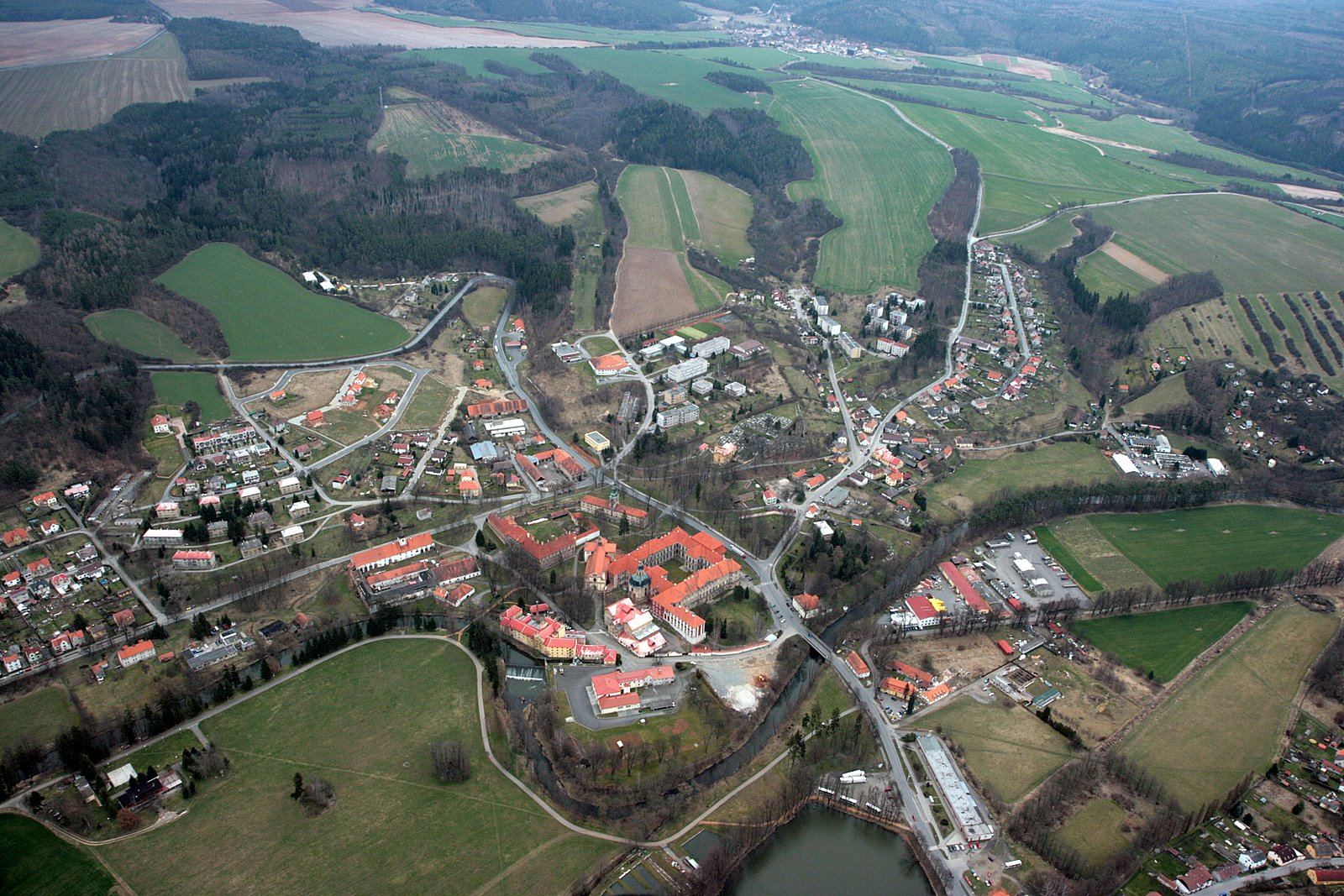
- Aerial view

- Flag Coat of arms

- Location in the Czech Republic
- Coordinates: 49°56′5″N 13°23′26″E
- Country: Czech Republic
- Region: Plzeň
- District: Plzeň-North
- First mentioned: 1144

Government
  - Mayor: Eva Kantor Pořádková

Area
  - Total: 57.13 km^{2} (22.06 sq mi)
- Elevation: 350 m (1,150 ft)

Population (2026-01-01)
  - Total: 2,888
  - Density: 50.55/km^{2} (130.9/sq mi)
- Time zone: UTC+1 (CET)
  - Summer (DST): UTC+2 (CEST)
- Postal code: 331 01
- Website: www.plasy.cz

Plasy (Czech pronunciation: [ˈplasɪ]; German: Plass) is a town in Plzeň-North District in the Plzeň Region of the Czech Republic. It has about 2,900 inhabitants. The town is located on the Střela River in the Plasy Uplands. Plasy is known for the former Plasy Monastery, which is protected as a national cultural monument.

== Administrative division ==
Plasy consists of six municipal parts (in brackets population according to the 2021 census):

- Plasy (1,891)
- Babina (214)
- Horní Hradiště (168)
- Lomnička (80)
- Nebřeziny (179)
- Žebnice (158)

== Etymology ==
The name Plasy is derived from the Old Czech word plasy (singular plasa), which meant 'strips of land' or 'elevated places'.

== Geography ==
Plasy is located about 19 kilometres (12 mi) north of Plzeň. It lies in the Plasy Uplands. The highest point is the hill Spálená hora at 514 m (1,686 ft) above sea level. The Střela River flows through the town.

== History ==
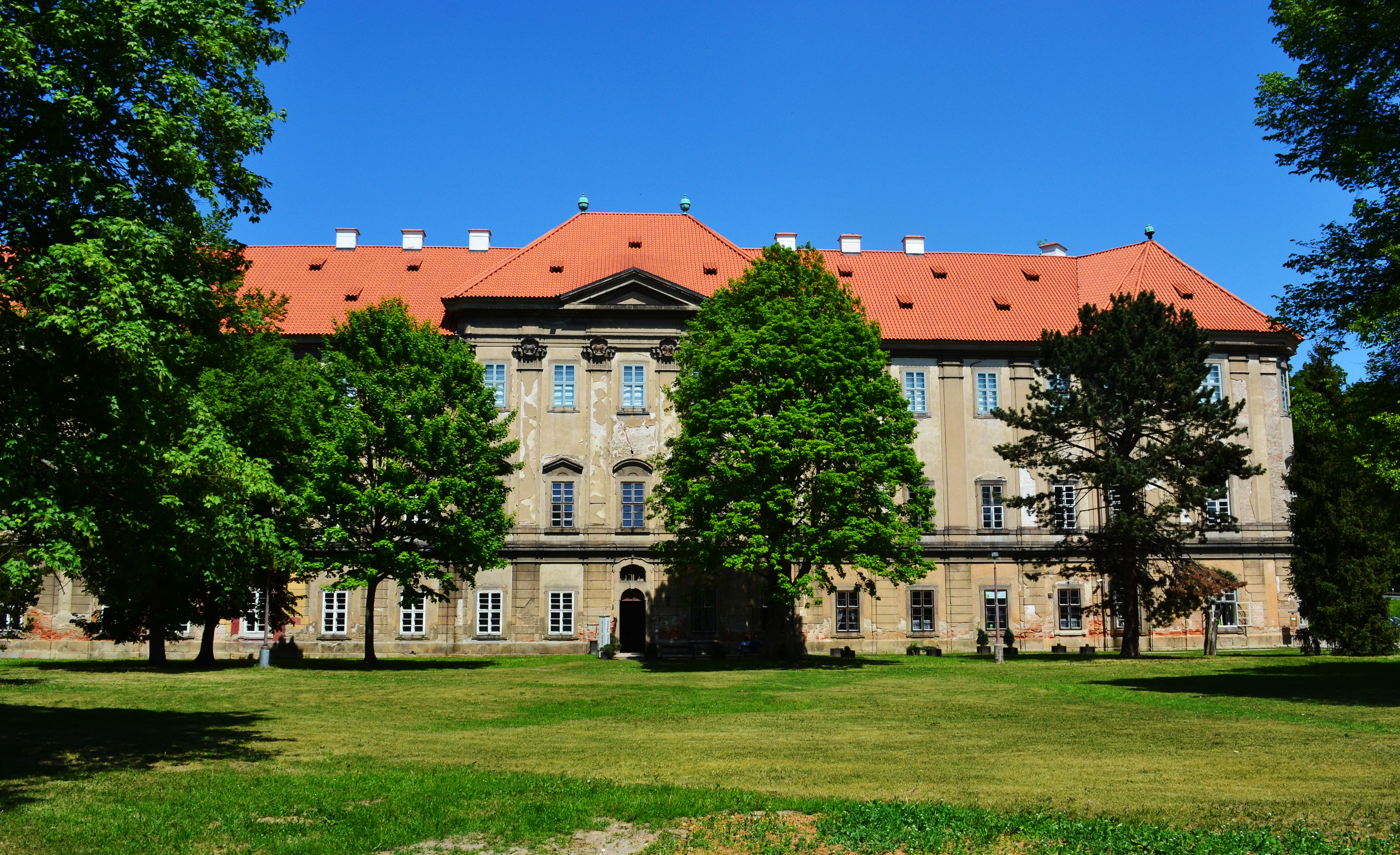
Plasy Monastery

The foundation of the town is connected with the foundation of the Cistercian monastery. The Plasy Monastery was founded in 1144 by then Prince Vladislaus II. The monastery experienced the greatest development during the reign of King Wenceslaus I, and its property gradually grew to cover 50 surrounding villages. The development of the monastery ended during the Hussite Wars, when it was burned down in 1421.

The entire 15th and 16th centuries mean a period of deep decline. After the Battle of White Mountain in 1620, the monastery's financial situation improved, most of it former properties were returned to it, and the construction of new buildings on the monastery grounds began.

The monastery was abolished in 1785 by decree of Emperor Joseph II. In 1826, the monastery building with the whole estate was purchased by Klemens von Metternich, who is buried here in the family tomb.

== Demographics ==
Historical population

Year	Pop.	±%
1869	2,700	—
1880	2,777	+2.9%
1890	2,623	−5.5%
1900	2,623	+0.0%
1910	2,891	+10.2%

Year	Pop.	±%
1921	2,896	+0.2%
1930	3,305	+14.1%
1950	2,783	−15.8%
1961	2,886	+3.7%
1970	2,836	−1.7%

Year	Pop.	±%
1980	2,768	−2.4%
1991	2,691	−2.8%
2001	2,621	−2.6%
2011	2,572	−1.9%
2021	2,690	+4.6%

Source: Censuses

== Transport ==
Plasy is located on the railway line heading from Plzeň to Žihle and Most.

== Sights ==
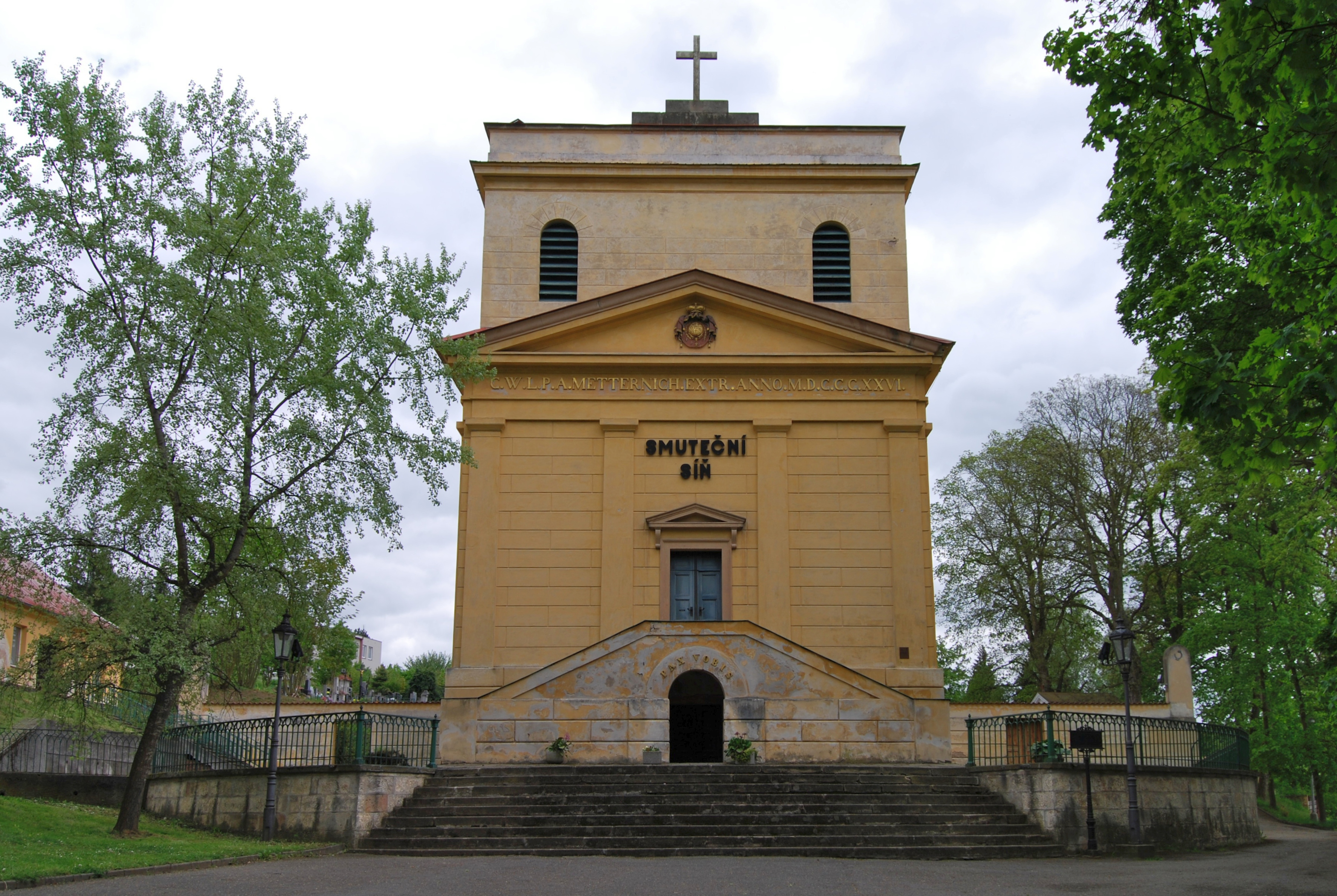
Metternich family tomb

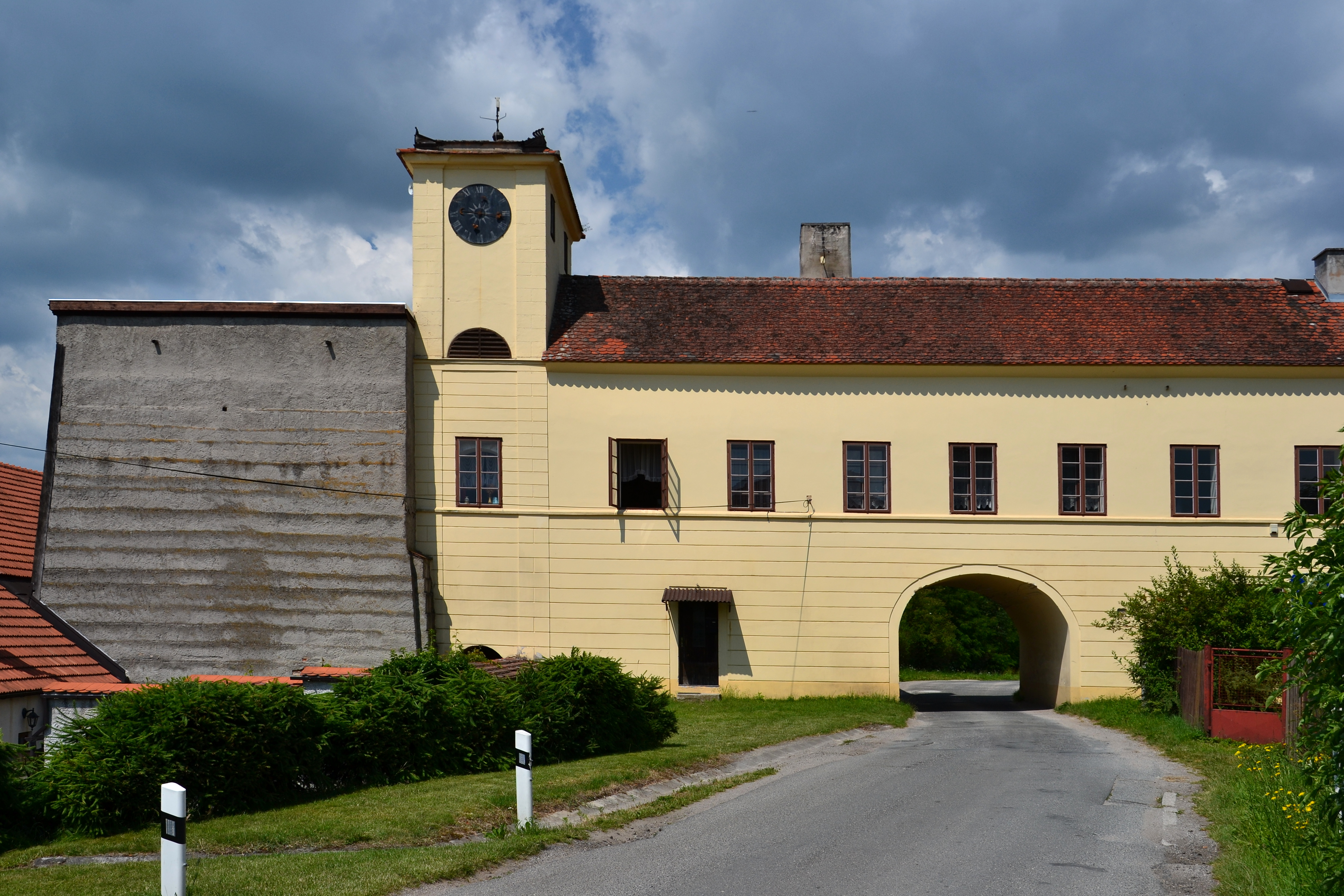
Former ironworks of Saint Clement

The monastery complex is the most significant landmark of Plasy, protected as a national cultural monument. It contains the former monastery, Church of the Assumption of the Virgin Mary, Baroque granary with the Royal Chapel of Saints Wenceslaus and Mary Magdalene, and abbot's residence. In 1661–1666, the church was rebuilt in the early Baroque style. The new convent building was built in 1711–1740 by Jan Santini Aichel and after his death by Kilian Ignaz Dientzenhofer. Today the complex is open to the public and offers guided tours.

The former Church of Saint Wenceslaus was built in the Gothic style and rebuilt in the Baroque style in 1690. After the abolition of the monastery, it was modified into the family tomb of the Metternich family.

== Notable people ==
- Mauritius Vogt (1669–1730), German geographer, historian, cartographer and musician; lived here
- Klemens von Metternich (1773–1859), Austrian diplomat and politician
- Václav Levý (1820–1870), sculptor
- Antonín Wiehl (1846–1910), architect
- Viktor Stretti (1878–1957), painter
- Rudolf Jung (1882–1945), Nazi ideologue
- Jiří Kornatovský (born 1952), painter
