= Berounka =

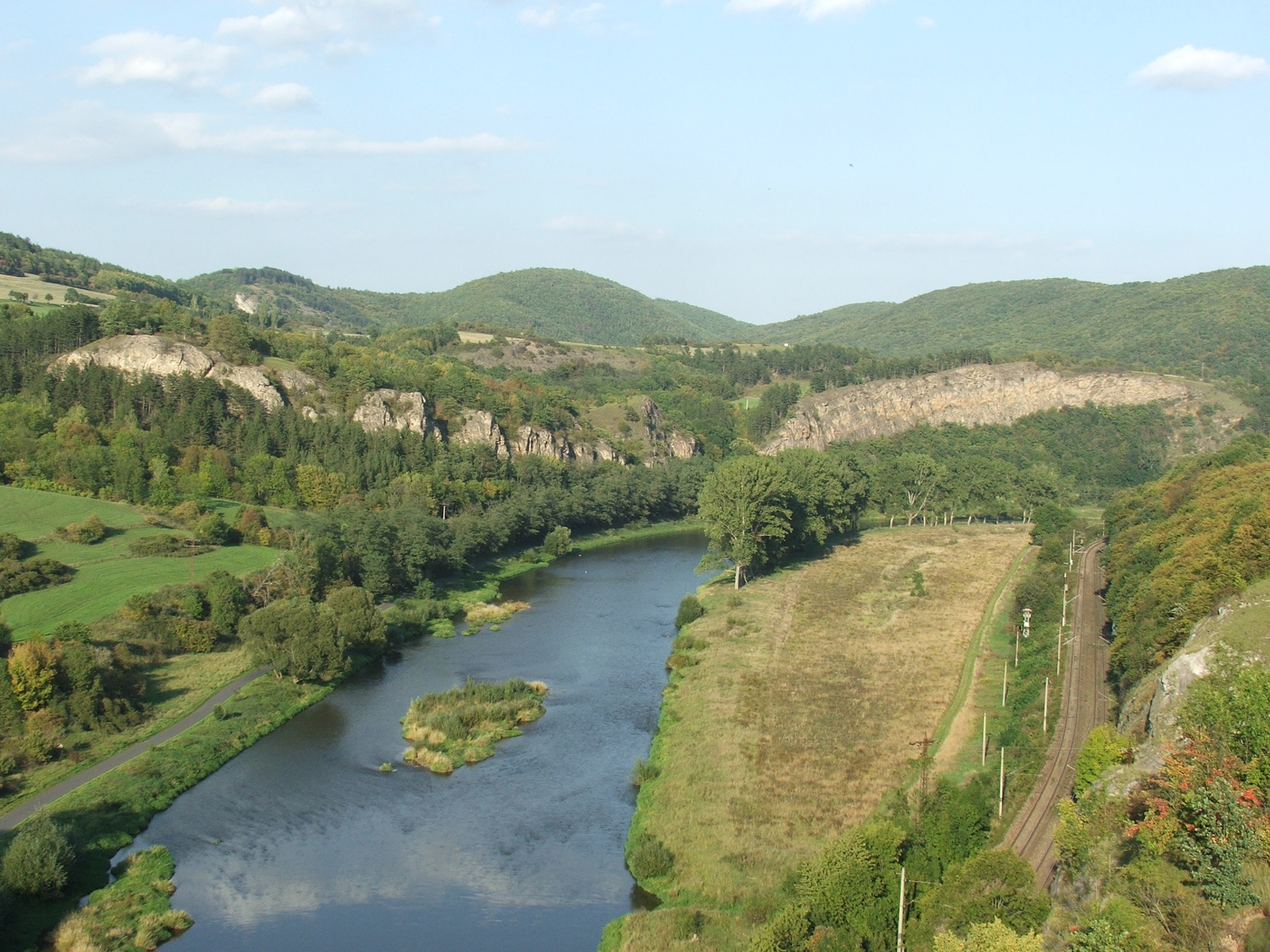
- The Berounka under Tetín

Location
- Country: Czech Republic
- Regions: Plzeň; Central Bohemian; Prague

Physical characteristics
- Source: Mže
  - location: Mähring, Upper Palatine Forest
  - coordinates: 49°51′10″N 12°28′1″E
  - elevation: 726 m (2,382 ft)
- Mouth
  - location: Vltava
  - coordinates: 49°59′43″N 14°24′5″E
  - elevation: 189 m (620 ft)
- Length: 244.6 km (152.0 mi)
- Basin size: 8,854.2 km^{2} (3,418.6 sq mi)
- Discharge
  - average: 36 m^{3}/s (1,300 cu ft/s) near estuary

Basin features
- Progression: Vltava→ Elbe→ North Sea

The Berounka (Czech pronunciation: [ˈbɛrouŋka]) is a river in the Czech Republic, a left tributary of the Vltava River. It flows through the Plzeň and Central Bohemian regions to Prague. It is formed by the confluence of the Mže and Radbuza rivers in Plzeň. Together with the Mže, which is its main source, the Berounka is 244.6 km (152.0 mi) long, which makes it the fifth longest river in the Czech Republic. Without the Mže, it is 139.4 km (86.6 mi) long.

== Etymology ==
The river is named after the town of Beroun. Originally, the entire stream was called Mže (German: Mies) and the name first appeared in the 12th century, among others in Chronica Boemorum. The name was written as Mse, Msa and Misa. From the 17th century, the lower course started to be named Berounka, but the name Mže still appeared as a name for the entire stream at the end of the 19th century. In order to avoid confusion, an initiative to rename the lower course back to the historical name Mže was created in 2008, but its efforts were unsuccessful due to the strongly adopted current name.

== Characteristic ==
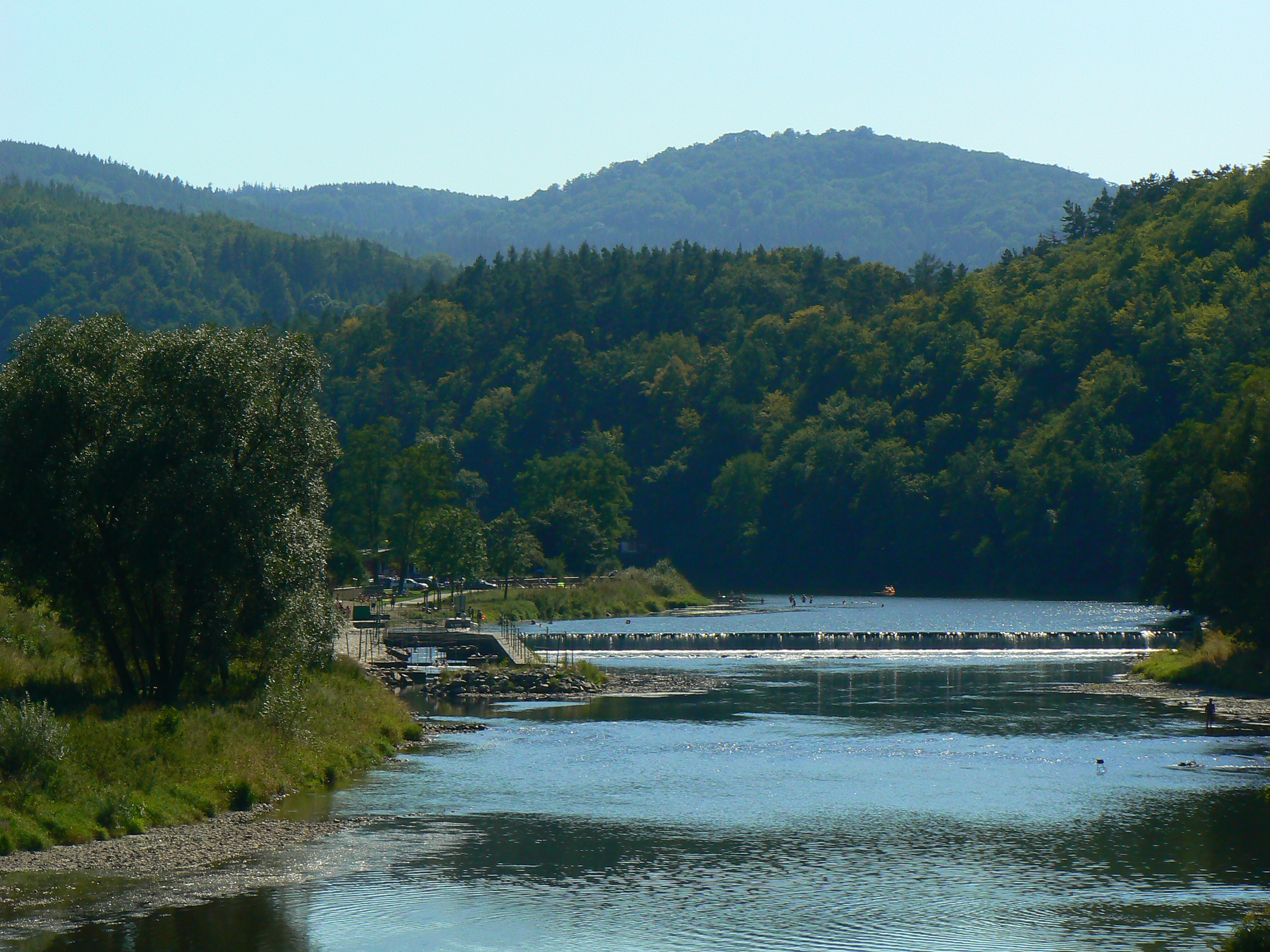
The Berounka in Roztoky

From a water management point of view, the Berounka and Mže are two different rivers with separate numbering of river kilometres. In a broader point of view, the Berounka (as Mže) originates in the territory of Mähring in the Upper Palatine Forest at an elevation of 726 m (2,382 ft) and flows to Prague-Lahovice, where it enters the Vltava River at an elevation of 189 m (620 ft). It is 244.57 km (151.97 mi) long, of which 2.34 km (1.45 mi) is in Germany. In the Czech Republic, it is 242.23 km (150.51 mi) long, which makes it the fifth longest river in the country. Its drainage basin has an area of 8,854.2 km^{2} (3,418.6 sq mi). The name Berounka is used from the confluence of the Mže with the Radbuza in Plzeň and from this point to the confluence with the Vltava, the river is 139.4 km (86.6 mi) long.

The Berounka has many significant tributaries. The sources and longest tributaries of the Berounka are:

Tributary	Length (km)	River km	Side
Radbuza	109.7	138.9	right
Mže	105.1	138.9	–
Střela	101.7	102.7	left
Úslava	96.3	136.0	right
Loděnice	64.7	30.6	left
Litavka	54.9	34.3	right
Klabava	51.2	121.9	right
Rakovnický potok	48.5	62.4	left
Třemošná	43.7	111.4	left
Javornice	30.9	81.3	left
Zbirožský potok	28.8	77.3	right
Radotínský potok	22.9	3.7	left
Klíčava	22.3	53.8	left
Radnický potok	18.7	96.2	right

== Settlements ==
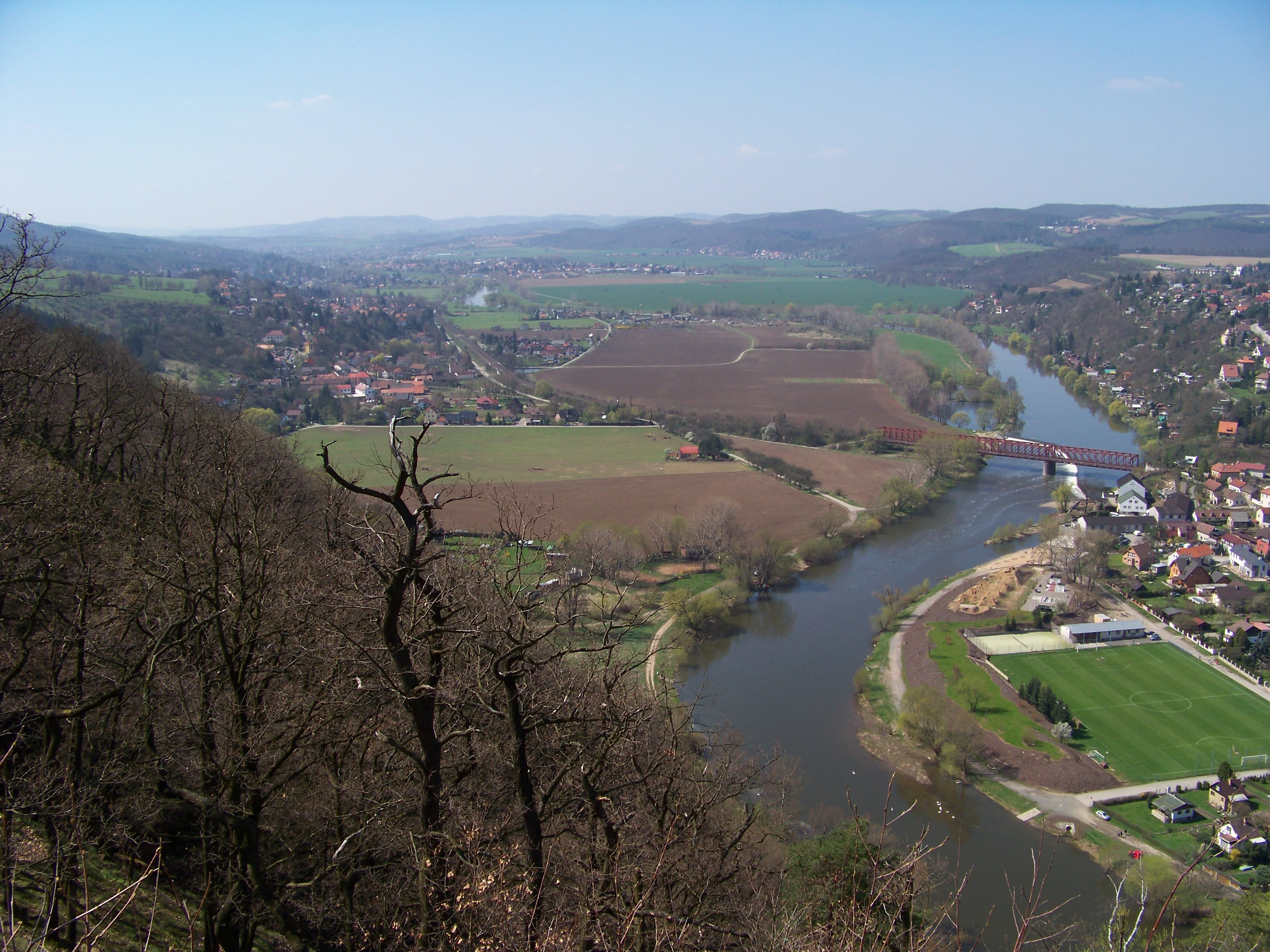
The Berounka in Černošice

There are several large settlements on the river. The Mže flows through Tachov and Stříbro. After its confluence with the Radbuza in Plzeň, the Berounka flows through Beroun, Řevnice, Dobřichovice, Černošice and along the edge of Prague.

== Bodies of water ==
There are 7,502 bodies of water in the basin area; the largest of them is the Hracholusky Reservoir with an area of 352 ha (870 acres), built at the confluence of the Mže and the stream Úterský potok. There are no bodies of water built directly on the lower course of the Berounka.

== Fauna ==
The river is home to the mollusc Unio pictorum, which is critically endangered within the Czech Republic. The endemic species Bulgarica nitidosa lives by the river.

== Use ==
There is an artificial slalom course in Roztoky, on the 63rd river km.

== Tourism ==
The Berounka is considered one of the most beautiful rivers in the country and is among the most popular rivers for river tourism. Almost its entire flow from Plzeň is navigable. It is popular thanks to the sections in the protected landscape areas of Křivoklátsko and Český kras, which lead through unspoiled nature. The Berounka belongs to the undemanding rivers suitable for beginner paddlers. An 82 km long educational trail for paddlers runs along the river.
