= Roztoky (Rakovník District) =

- Municipality
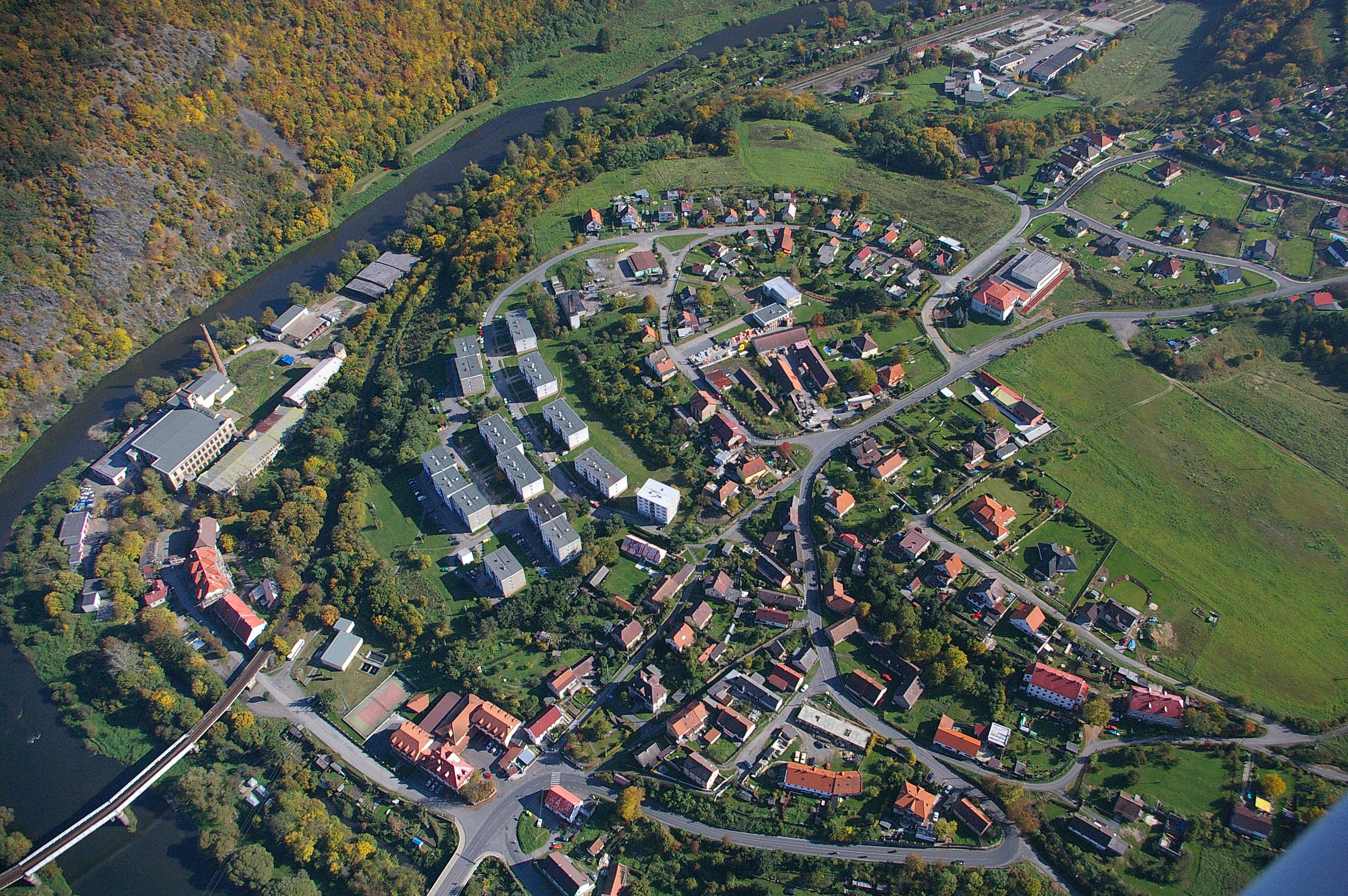
- Aerial view

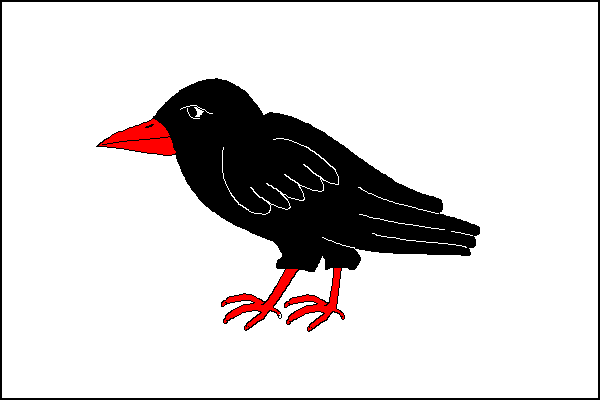
- Flag Coat of arms

- Location in the Czech Republic
- Coordinates: 50°1′36″N 13°52′5″E
- Country: Czech Republic
- Region: Central Bohemian
- District: Rakovník
- First mentioned: 1406

Area
  - Total: 22.21 km^{2} (8.58 sq mi)
- Elevation: 275 m (902 ft)

Population (2026-01-01)
  - Total: 1,009
  - Density: 45.43/km^{2} (117.7/sq mi)
- Time zone: UTC+1 (CET)
  - Summer (DST): UTC+2 (CEST)
- Postal code: 270 23
- Website: www.obec-roztoky.cz

Roztoky is a municipality and village in Rakovník District in the Central Bohemian Region of the Czech Republic. It has about 1,000 inhabitants. It is situated on the Berounka River.

== Etymology ==
The name is derived from rozdělený tok, i.e. 'divided stream'. It is a common Czech geographical name for places founded at the confluence of a smaller stream with a river.

== Geography ==
Roztoky is located about 12 kilometres (7 mi) southeast of Rakovník and 34 km (21 mi) west of Prague. It lies in the Křivoklát Highlands. The highest point is the hill Špička at 531 m (1,742 ft) above sea level. The village is situated in the meander of the Berounka River. The entire municipal territory lies within the Křivoklátsko Landscape Protected Area.

== History ==
The first written mention of Roztoky is from 1406. It was founded around 1370. The village began to develop in 1824, when Counts of Fürstenberg established ironworks here.

== Demographics ==
Historical population

Year	Pop.	±%
1869	782	—
1880	903	+15.5%
1890	933	+3.3%
1900	943	+1.1%
1910	864	−8.4%

Year	Pop.	±%
1921	1,082	+25.2%
1930	1,024	−5.4%
1950	848	−17.2%
1961	873	+2.9%
1970	840	−3.8%

Year	Pop.	±%
1980	1,100	+31.0%
1991	1,156	+5.1%
2001	1,026	−11.2%
2011	1,074	+4.7%
2021	1,013	−5.7%

Source: Censuses

== Transport ==
Roztoky is located on the railway line Beroun–Rakovník.

== Sights ==
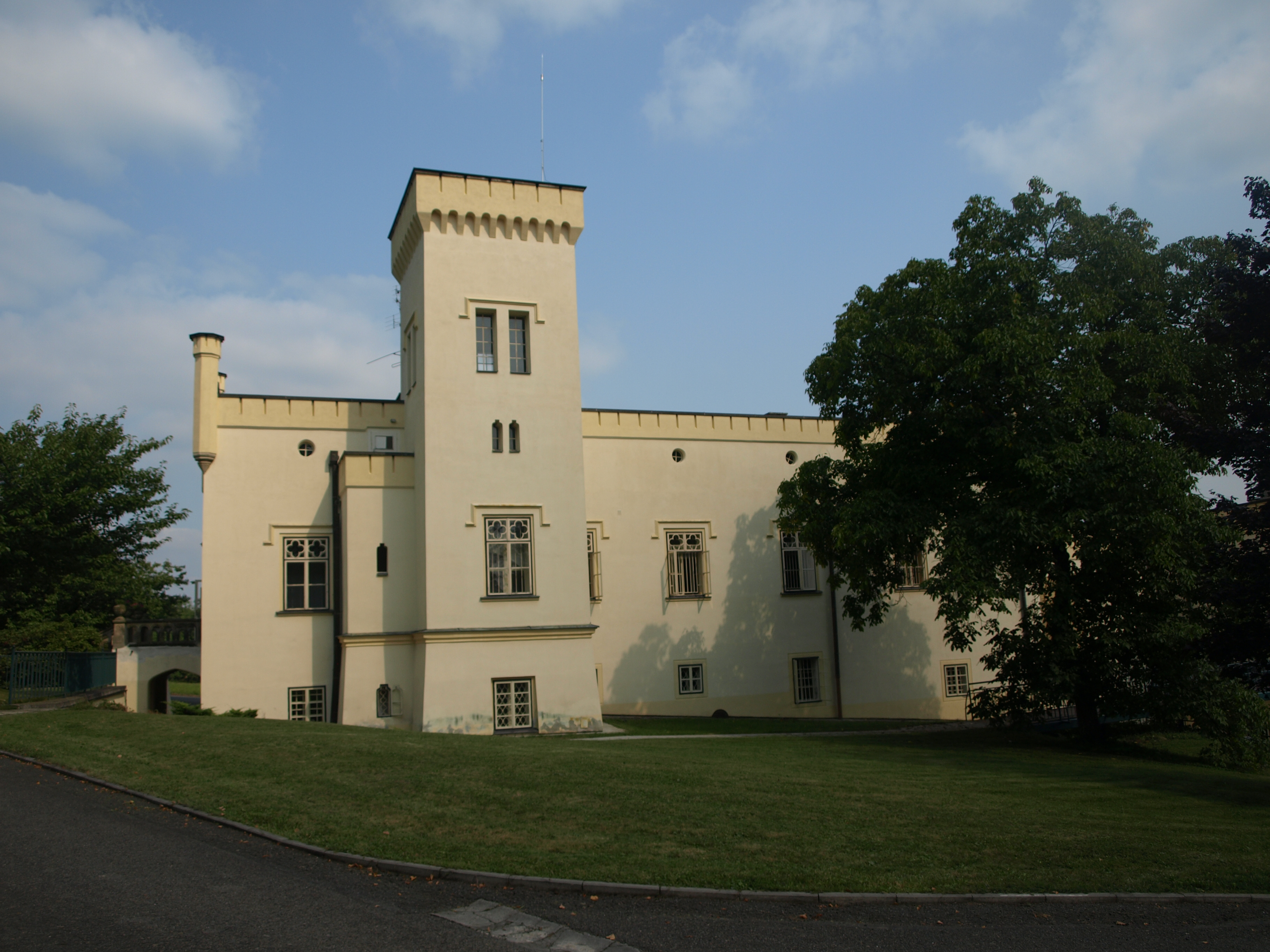
Leontýn Castle

A valuable building is the Leontýn Castle, located in the woods south of the village. It was originally a Neoclassical hunting lodge from the beginning of the 19th century, extended and rebuilt in the neo-Gothic style in the second half of the 19th century. Next to the castle is a neo-Gothic chapel of Saint Wenceslaus from 1866 and a landscape park. Today, the castle houses a social care institution for the mentally disabled.

A cultural monument is the Karlov Farmyard. It is a late Baroque farmyard with an unusual circular floor plan. It was founded in 1779 in the woods south of the Roztoky village. Soon after, a small settlement arose around it. Today, the farmyard is privately owned and is still used for agricultural purposes.
