= Mähring =

- Municipality
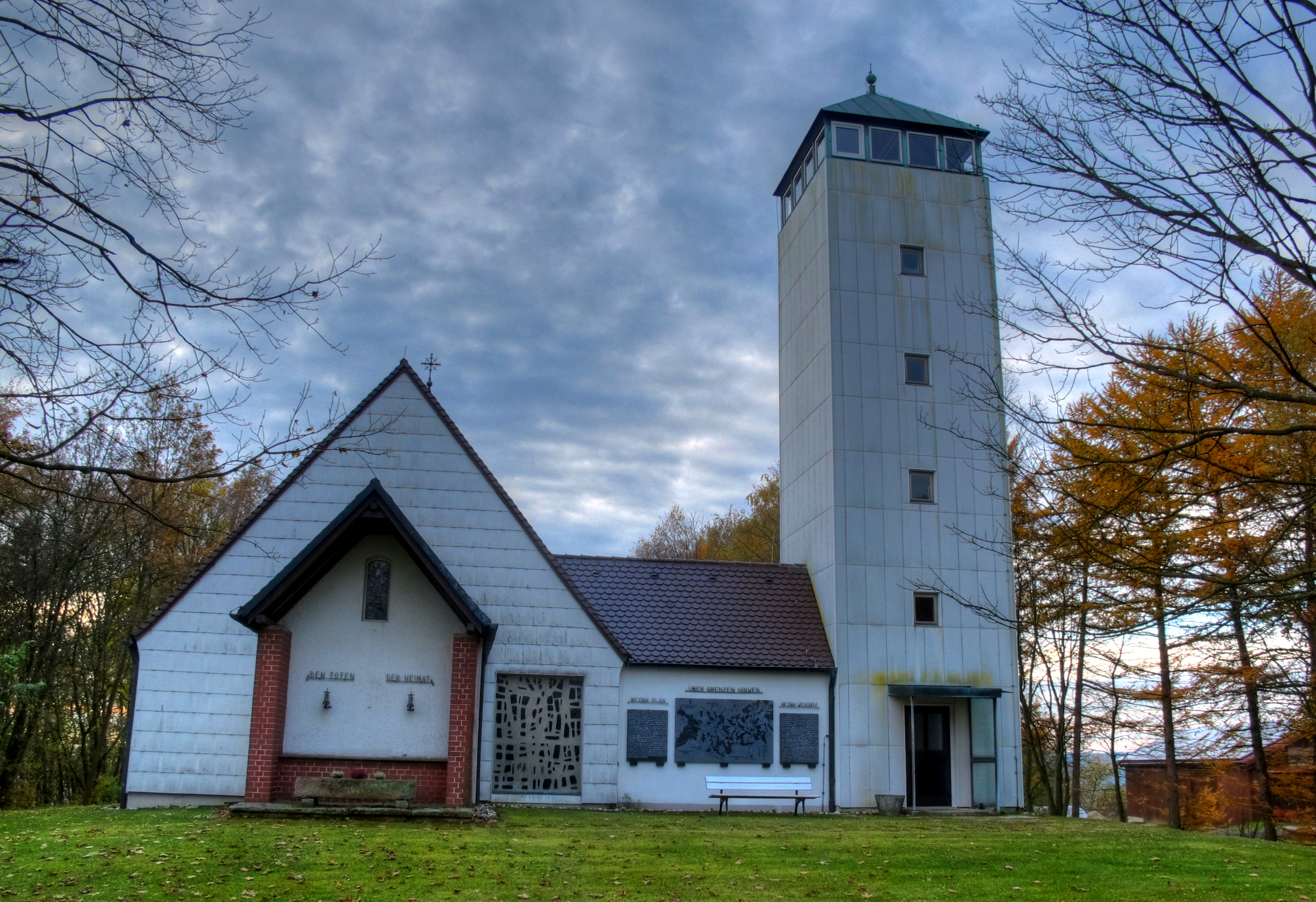
- Saint Anne Church

- Coat of arms

- Location of Mähring within Tirschenreuth district
- Interactive map of Mähring
- Location within Germany Location within Bavaria
- Coordinates: 49°55′N 12°31′E
- Country: Germany
- State: Bavaria
- Admin. region: Oberpfalz
- District: Tirschenreuth
- Subdivisions: 19 Ortsteile

Government
  - Mayor (2020–26): Franz Schöner (CSU)

Area
  - Total: 72.93 km^{2} (28.16 sq mi)
- Elevation: 652 m (2,139 ft)

Population (2025-12-31)
  - Total: 1,757
  - Density: 24.09/km^{2} (62.40/sq mi)
- Time zone: UTC+01:00 (CET)
  - Summer (DST): UTC+02:00 (CEST)
- Postal codes: 95695
- Dialling codes: 09639
- Vehicle registration: TIR
- Website: www.maehring.de

Mähring (German pronunciation: [ˈmɛːʁɪŋ]) is a municipality in the district of Tirschenreuth in Bavaria, Germany.
