= Rakovnický potok =

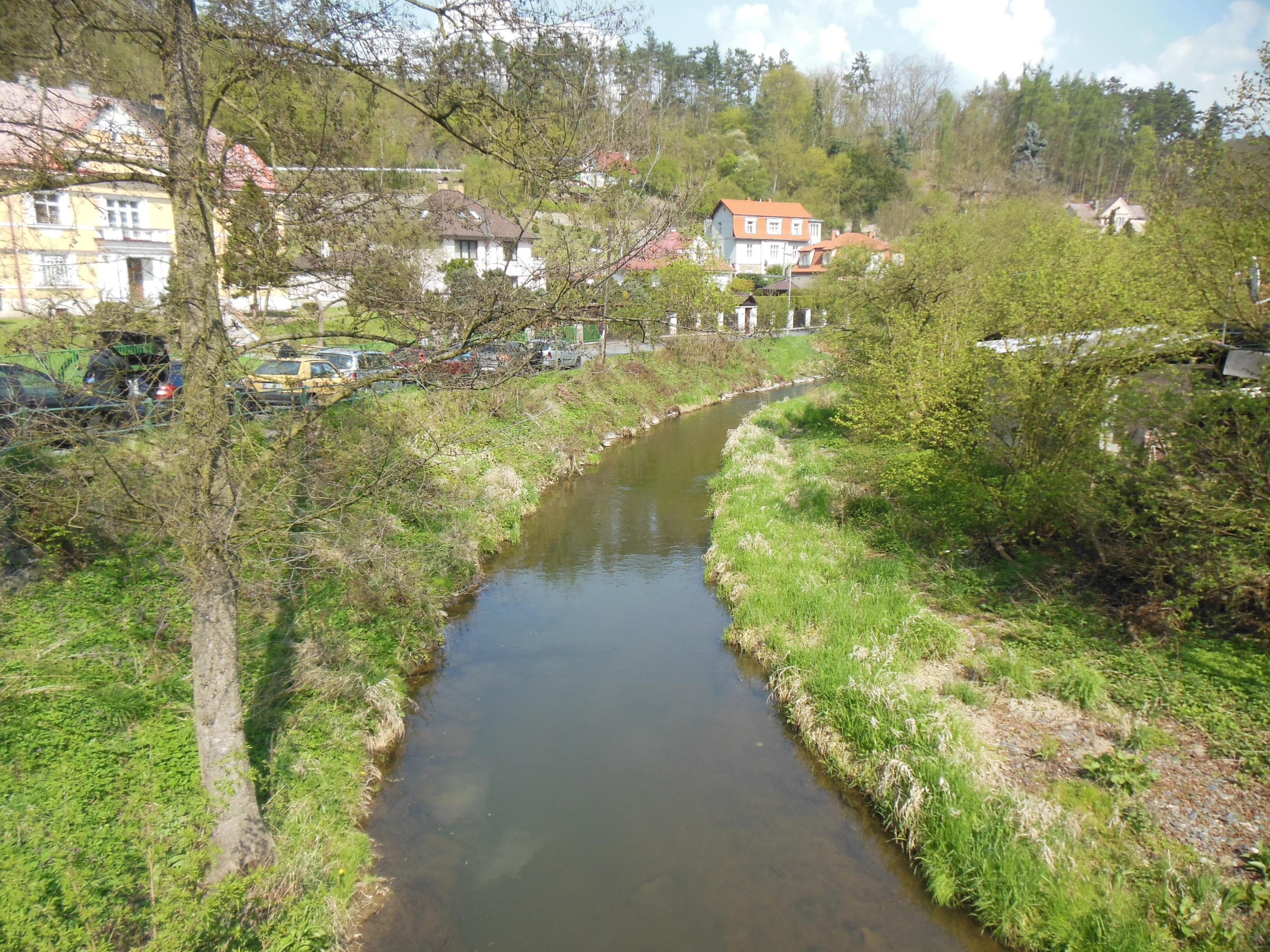
- The Rakovnický potok in Křivoklát

Location
- Country: Czech Republic
- Region: Central Bohemian

Physical characteristics
- Source
  - location: Drahouš, Rakovník Uplands
  - coordinates: 50°4′16″N 13°29′34″E
  - elevation: 578 m (1,896 ft)
- Mouth
  - location: Berounka
  - coordinates: 50°1′50″N 13°52′2″E
  - elevation: 240 m (790 ft)
- Length: 48.5 km (30.1 mi)
- Basin size: 367.9 km^{2} (142.0 sq mi)
- Discharge
  - average: 0.86 m^{3}/s (30 cu ft/s) near estuary

Basin features
- Progression: Berounka→ Vltava→ Elbe→ North Sea

The Rakovnický potok is a stream in the Czech Republic, a left tributary of the Berounka River. It flows through the Central Bohemian Region. It is 48.5 km (30.1 mi) long.

== Etymology ==
The name means 'Rakovník stream' in Czech.

== Characteristic ==
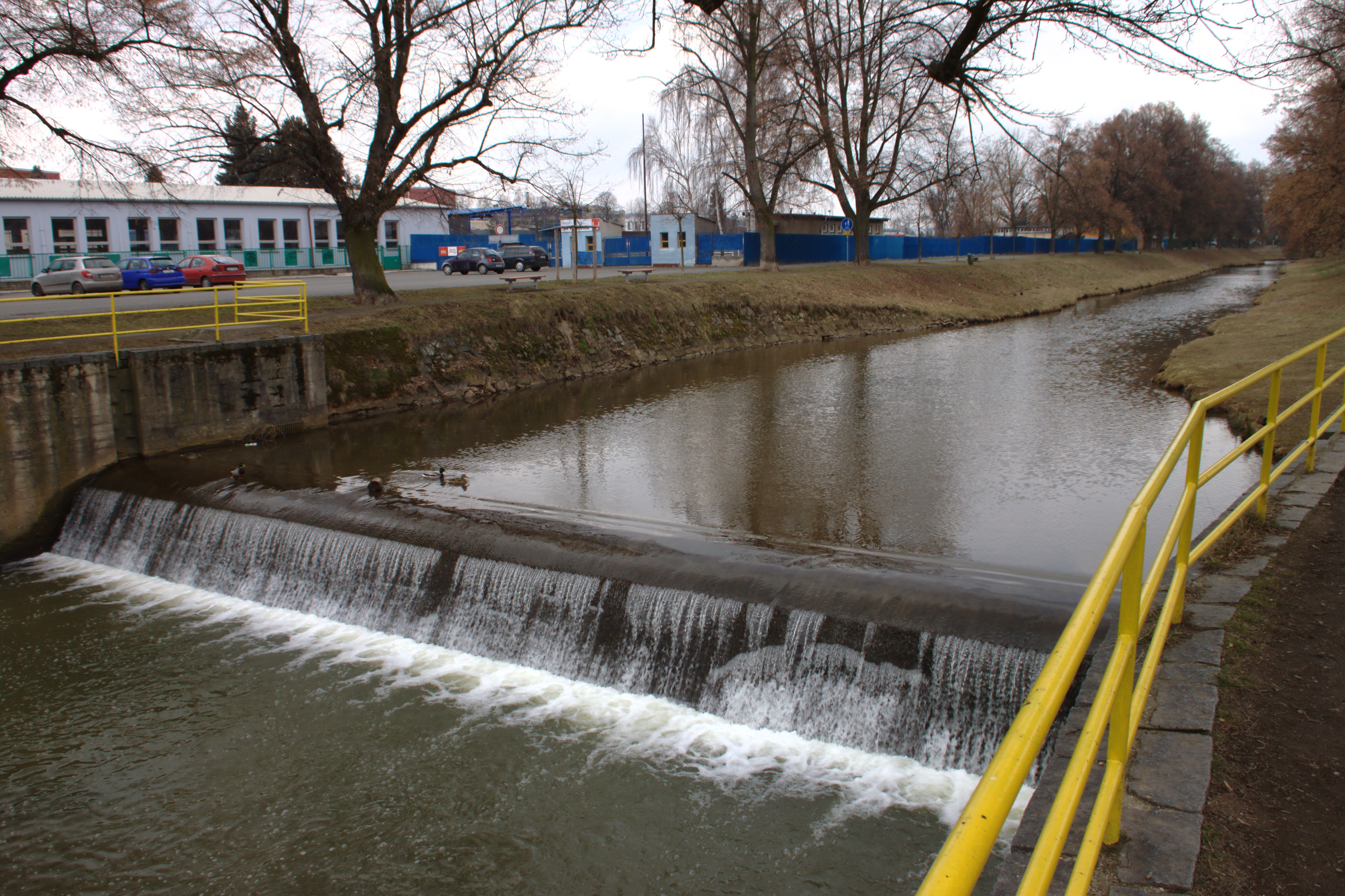
The Rakovnický potok in Rakovník

The Rakovnický potok originates in the territory of Drahouš in the Rakovník Uplands at an elevation of 578 m (1,896 ft) and flows to Křivoklát, where it enters the Berounka River at an elevation of 240 m (790 ft). It is 48.5 km (30.1 mi) long. Its drainage basin has an area of 367.9 km^{2} (142.0 sq mi).

The longest tributaries of the Rakovnický potok are:

Tributary	Length (km)	Side
Lišanský potok	19.2	left
Kolešovický potok	12.7	left
Ryšava	9.1	left
Petrovický potok	8.3	right

== Course ==
The most notable settlement on the stream is the town of Rakovník. The stream flows through the municipal territories of Drahouš, Krty, Jesenice, Oráčov, Švihov, Pšovlky, Šanov, Senomaty, Rakovník, Pavlíkov, Lašovice, Pustověty, Velká Buková, Městečko and Křivoklát.

== Bodies of water ==
There are 224 bodies of water in the basin area. A system of fishponds is built on the upper course of the stream. The largest of them is Velký rybník with an area of 40.4 ha (100 acres).

== Nature ==
The lower couse of the stream flows through the Křivoklátsko Protected Landscape Area.

Common fish in the river include river trout, stone loach and European perch.

== See also ==
- List of rivers of the Czech Republic
