= Nezabudice =

- Municipality
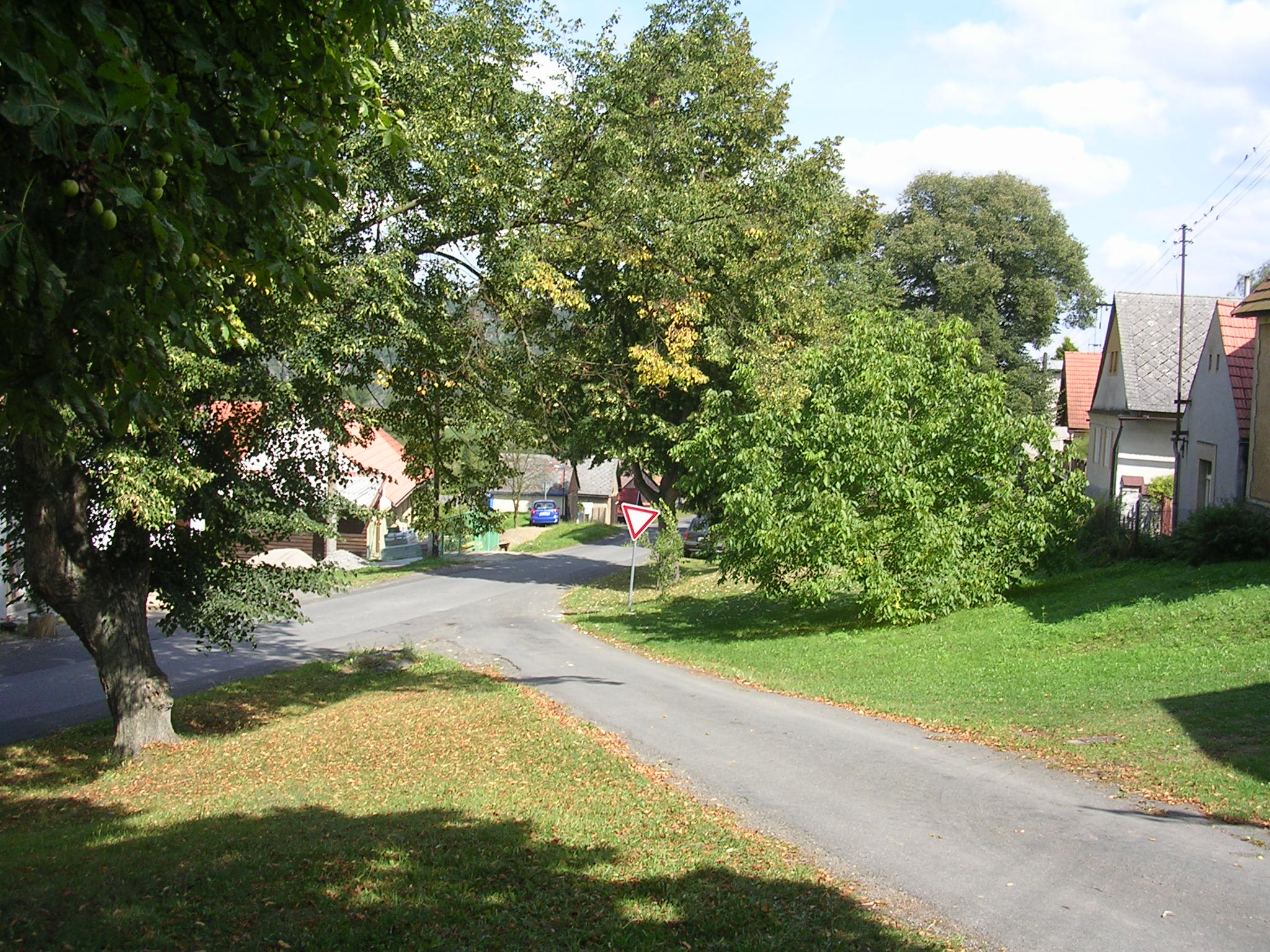
- Centre of Nezabudice

- Flag Coat of arms

- Location in the Czech Republic
- Coordinates: 50°0′48″N 13°49′20″E
- Country: Czech Republic
- Region: Central Bohemian
- District: Rakovník
- First mentioned: 1115

Area
  - Total: 7.18 km^{2} (2.77 sq mi)
- Elevation: 303 m (994 ft)

Population (2026-01-01)
  - Total: 89
  - Density: 12/km^{2} (32/sq mi)
- Time zone: UTC+1 (CET)
  - Summer (DST): UTC+2 (CEST)
- Postal code: 270 23
- Website: www.obec-nezabudice.cz

Nezabudice is a municipality and village in Rakovník District in the Central Bohemian Region of the Czech Republic. It has about 90 inhabitants.

== Etymology ==
The name is derived from the personal name Nezabud, meaning "the village of Nezabud's people".

== Geography ==
Nezabudice is located about 12 kilometres (7 mi) southeast of Rakovník and 37 km (23 mi) west of Prague. It lies in the Křivoklát Highlands. The highest point is a nameless hill at 454 m (1,490 ft) above sea level. The municipality is situated on the left bank of the Berounka River and entirely within the Křivoklátsko Protected Landscape Area.

== History ==
Nezabudice was probably founded around 1108. The first written mention of Nezabudice is from 1115, when Duke Vladislaus I donated the village to the monastery in Kladruby. However, in 1250, the village was listed as a property of the monastery in Plasy. After the exchange of properties between the nobility and the monastery in 1332, Nezabudice became part of the Křivoklát estate.

In the first half of the 16th century, Nezabudice experienced its greatest boom. After the plague epidemic in 1568 and the Thirty Years' War, the population decreased. Further plague epidemics affected the village in 1680 and 1713. At the end of the 17th century, Nezabudice was acquired by the Waldstein family. In 1756, the entire Křivoklát estate was inherited by the Fürstenberg family.

== Demographics ==
Historical population

Year	Pop.	±%
1869	419	—
1880	372	−11.2%
1890	307	−17.5%
1900	296	−3.6%
1910	246	−16.9%

Year	Pop.	±%
1921	231	−6.1%
1930	238	+3.0%
1950	164	−31.1%
1961	143	−12.8%
1970	139	−2.8%

Year	Pop.	±%
1980	103	−25.9%
1991	83	−19.4%
2001	73	−12.0%
2011	68	−6.8%
2021	97	+42.6%

Source: Censuses

== Transport ==
There are no railways or major roads passing through the municipality.

== Sights ==
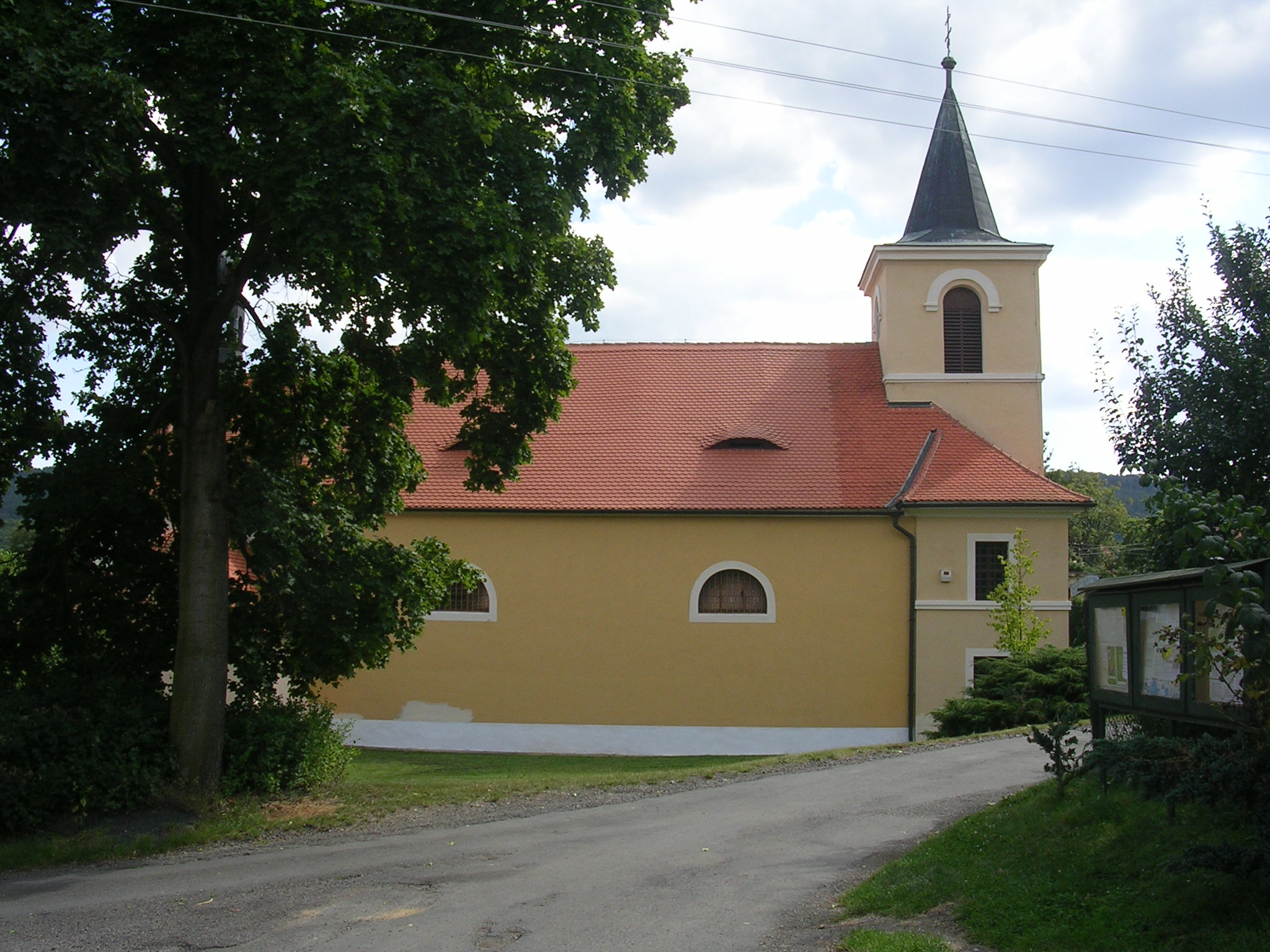
Church of Saint Lawrence

The main landmark of Nezabudice is the Church of Saint Lawrence. It was originally a Gothic church from the turn of the 14th and 15th centuries. In 1708, it was rebuilt in the Baroque style and the tower was added. The current appearance of the church is a result of Empire modifications from the year 1800.
