= Městečko =

- Municipality
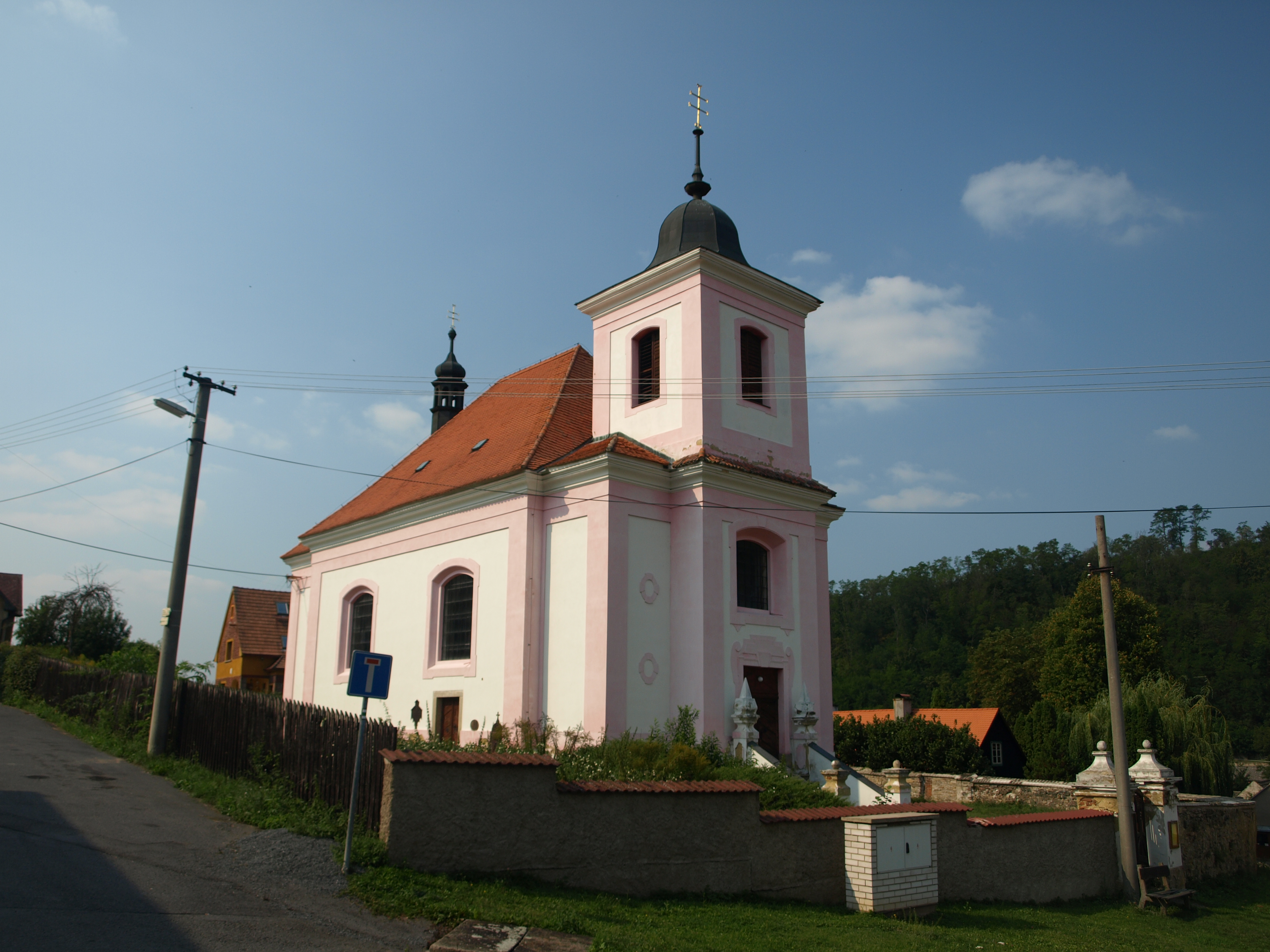
- Church of Saint James the Great

- Location in the Czech Republic
- Coordinates: 50°3′3″N 13°51′49″E
- Country: Czech Republic
- Region: Central Bohemian
- District: Rakovník
- First mentioned: 1352

Area
  - Total: 14.41 km^{2} (5.56 sq mi)
- Elevation: 265 m (869 ft)

Population (2026-01-01)
  - Total: 447
  - Density: 31.0/km^{2} (80.3/sq mi)
- Time zone: UTC+1 (CET)
  - Summer (DST): UTC+2 (CEST)
- Postal code: 270 23
- Website: www.obec-mestecko.cz

Městečko is a municipality and village in Rakovník District in the Central Bohemian Region of the Czech Republic. It has about 400 inhabitants.

== Etymology ==
The name literally means 'small town' in Czech.

== Geography ==
Městečko is located about 10 kilometres (6 mi) southeast of Rakovník and 33 km (21 mi) west of Prague. It lies on the border between the Křivoklát Highlands and Plasy Uplands. The highest point is the hill Mečná at 433 m (1,421 ft) above sea level. The built-up area is situated in the valley of the stream Rakovnický potok and its tributary, the Ryšava Stream. The northern municipal border is formed by the Klíčava River and Klíčava Reservoir. The entire municipality lies within the Křivoklátsko Protected Landscape Area.

== History ==
The first written mention of Městečko is from 1352, under the name Městec. The name Městečko first appeared in 1558. During the Hussite Wars, the settlement was completely destroyed and had to be rebuilt. The same situation was repeated during the Thirty Years' War, after which no inhabitants remained in the village, and it was restored only after its end in 1648.

== Demographics ==
Historical population

Year	Pop.	±%
1869	890	—
1880	891	+0.1%
1890	873	−2.0%
1900	826	−5.4%
1910	807	−2.3%

Year	Pop.	±%
1921	719	−10.9%
1930	729	+1.4%
1950	573	−21.4%
1961	590	+3.0%
1970	535	−9.3%

Year	Pop.	±%
1980	444	−17.0%
1991	426	−4.1%
2001	393	−7.7%
2011	437	+11.2%
2021	425	−2.7%

Source: Censuses

== Transport ==
Městečko is located on the railway line Beroun–Rakovník.

== Sights ==
The main landmark of Městečko is the Church of Saint James the Great. The originally Gothic church was rebuilt into its current Baroque form in 1733.

== Notable people ==
- Josef Trousil (born 1935), athlete
