= Křivoklát =

- Market town
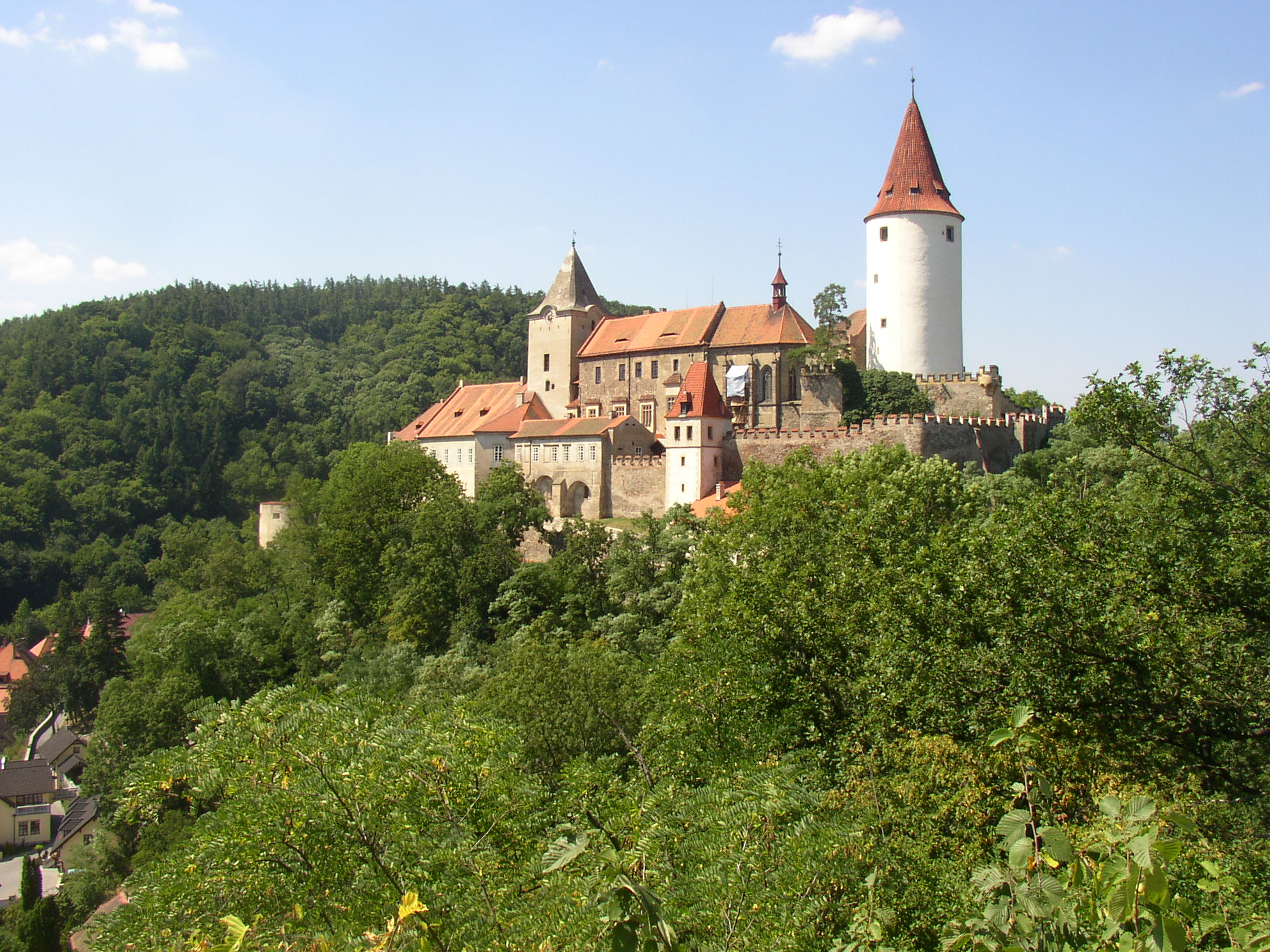
- Křivoklát Castle

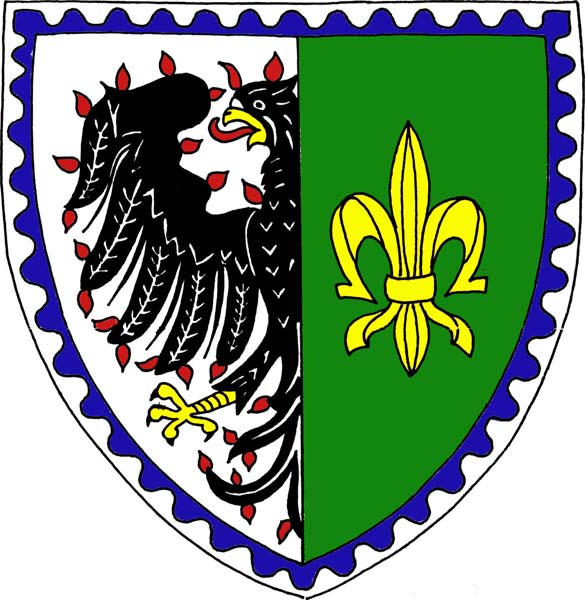
- Flag Coat of arms

- Location in the Czech Republic
- Coordinates: 50°2′13″N 13°52′43″E
- Country: Czech Republic
- Region: Central Bohemian
- District: Rakovník
- First mentioned: 1110

Area
  - Total: 6.42 km^{2} (2.48 sq mi)
- Elevation: 250 m (820 ft)

Population (2026-01-01)
  - Total: 655
  - Density: 102/km^{2} (264/sq mi)
- Time zone: UTC+1 (CET)
  - Summer (DST): UTC+2 (CEST)
- Postal code: 270 23
- Website: www.mestys-krivoklat.cz

Křivoklát (Czech pronunciation: [ˈkr̝̊ɪvoklaːt]; German: Pürglitz) is a market town in Rakovník District in the Central Bohemian Region of the Czech Republic. It has about 700 inhabitants. It is known for the medieval Křivoklát Castle, protected as a national cultural monument.

== Administrative division ==
Křivoklát consists of three municipal parts (in brackets population according to the 2021 census):

- Křivoklát (623)
- Častonice (35)
- Písky (25)

== Etymology ==
The initial name of Křivoklát was Krivoplát. It was derived from Czech words křivý plát (i.e. 'crooked plate') and probably referred to the non-flat terrain where the castle was founded. In the 14th century, the name was distorted to Křivoklát.

== Geography ==
Křivoklát is located about 12 kilometres (7 mi) southeast of Rakovník and 32 km (20 mi) west of Prague. It lies in the Křivoklát Highlands. The highest point is at 419 m (1,375 ft) above sea level. The market town is situated in the meander of the Berounka River at its confluence with the stream Rakovnický potok, which flows west of Křivoklát below the castle. The entire municipal territory lies within the Křivoklátsko Landscape Protected Area.

== History ==
The castle was founded at the beginning of the 11th century. In the 14th and 15th centuries, the first cottages appeared below the castle and the hamlet became known as Budy. Nearby hamlet Čamrdoves grew up, and during the 17th and 18th centuries they became one village. In 1886 the hamlets of Budy, Amalín, Čamrdoves and Častonice created a single administrative unit – the municipality of Křivoklát. In 1896, the municipality was promoted to a market town.

== Demographics ==
Historical population

Year	Pop.	±%
1869	920	—
1880	830	−9.8%
1890	902	+8.7%
1900	916	+1.6%
1910	928	+1.3%

Year	Pop.	±%
1921	800	−13.8%
1930	785	−1.9%
1950	762	−2.9%
1961	859	+12.7%
1970	846	−1.5%

Year	Pop.	±%
1980	689	−18.6%
1991	725	+5.2%
2001	677	−6.6%
2011	707	+4.4%
2021	683	−3.4%

Source: Censuses

== Transport ==
Křivoklát is located on the railway line Beroun–Rakovník.

== Sights ==
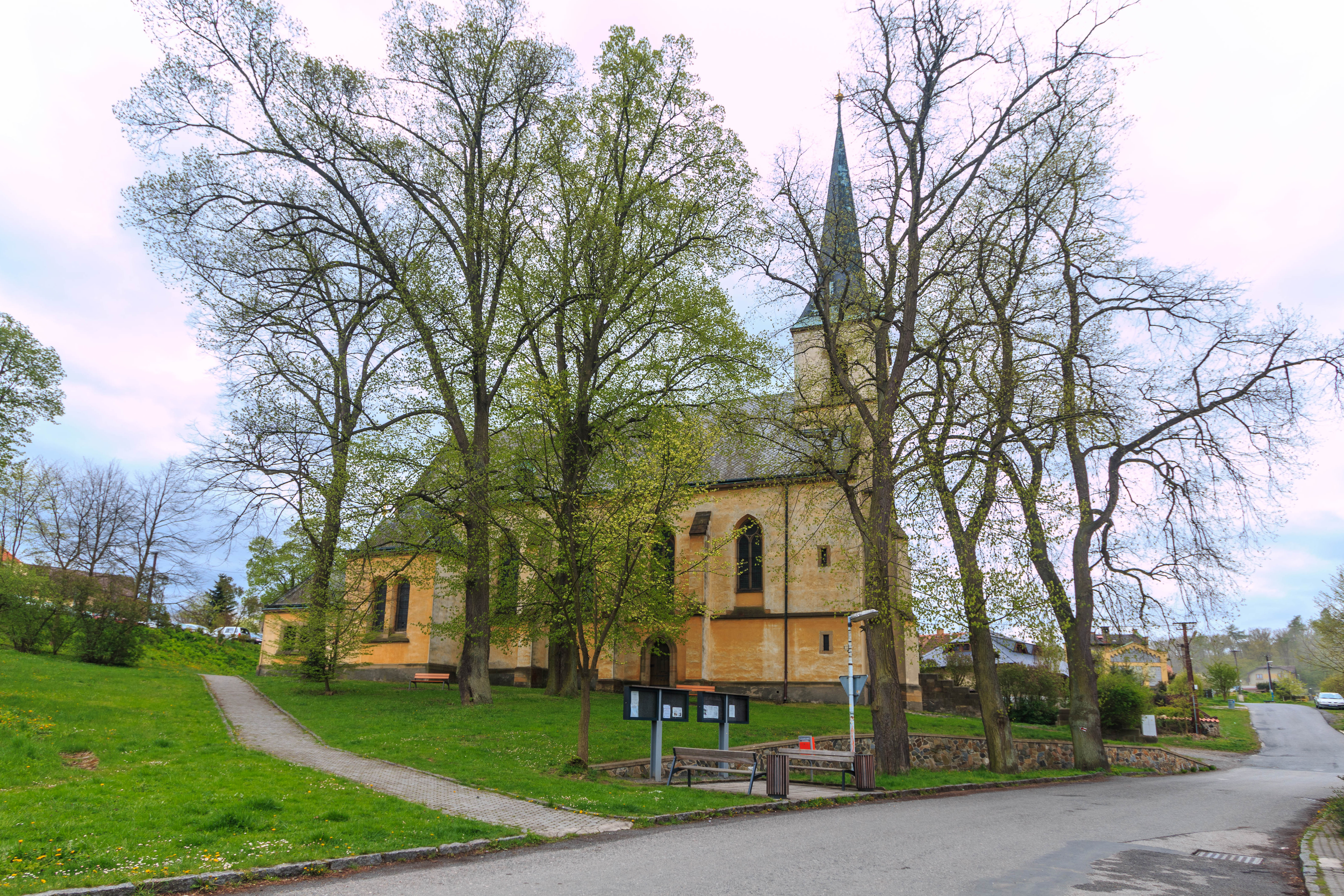
Church of Saint Peter

Křivoklát is a popular tourist destination known for the Křivoklát Castle. It is an importance medieval royal castle from the 13th century. From the 1470s to the 1520s, it was extensively rebuilt. It is protected as a national cultural monument. Today the castle is owned by the state. It is open to the public and offers guided tours.

A notable building is the Church of Saint Peter. It was originally a late Gothic church from 1522, rebuilt in the neo-Gothic style in the 1880s according to the design by Josef Mocker.

== Notable people ==
- Irma Reichová (1859–1930), operatic soprano
