= Terešov =

- Municipality
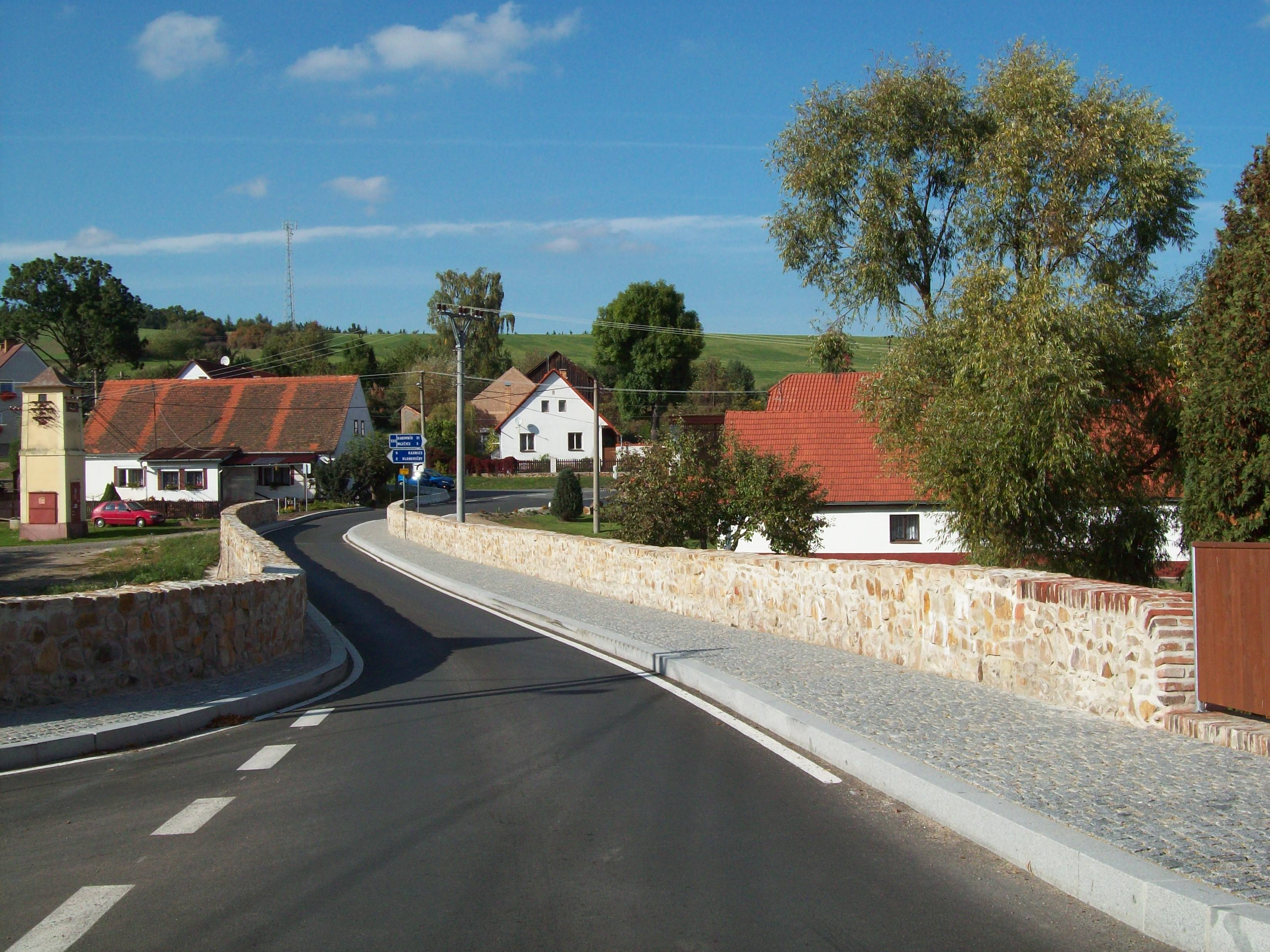
- Stone road bridge

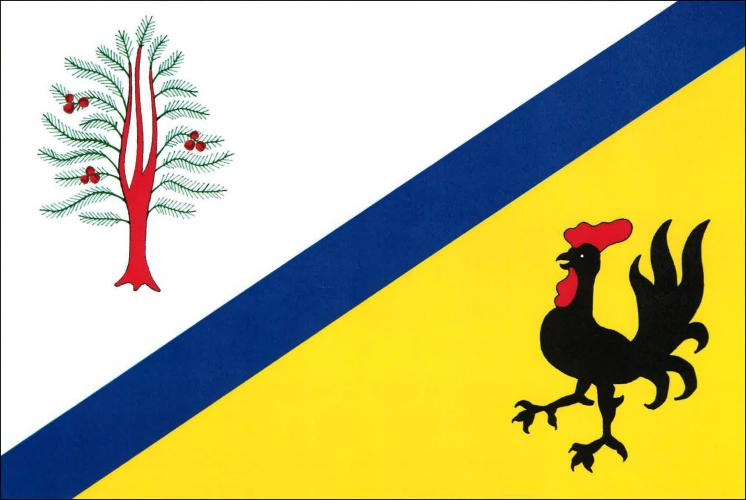
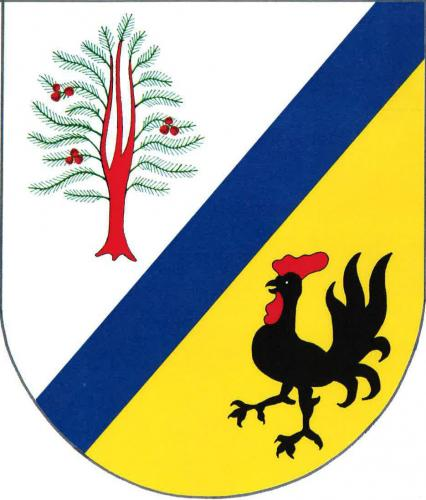
- Flag Coat of arms

- Location in the Czech Republic
- Coordinates: 49°53′48″N 13°41′59″E
- Country: Czech Republic
- Region: Plzeň
- District: Rokycany
- First mentioned: 1361

Area
  - Total: 6.70 km^{2} (2.59 sq mi)
- Elevation: 408 m (1,339 ft)

Population (2026-01-01)
  - Total: 183
  - Density: 27.3/km^{2} (70.7/sq mi)
- Time zone: UTC+1 (CET)
  - Summer (DST): UTC+2 (CEST)
- Postal code: 338 08
- Website: www.teresov.cz

Terešov (German: Tereschau) is a municipality and village in Rokycany District in the Plzeň Region of the Czech Republic. It has about 200 inhabitants.

== Administrative division ==
Terešov consists of two municipal parts (in brackets population according to the 2021 census):

- Terešov (164)
- Bílá Skála (35)

== Etymology ==
The name is derived from the personal name Tereš, meaning "Tereš's (court)".

== Geography ==
Terešov is located about 19 kilometres (12 mi) northeast of Rokycany and 27 km (17 mi) northeast of Plzeň. It lies in the Křivoklát Highlands. The highest point is the Kramářka hill at 499 m (1,637 ft) above sea level. The stream Terešovský potok flows through the municipality. The eastern part of the municipal territory extends into the Křivoklátsko Protected Landscape Area.

== History ==
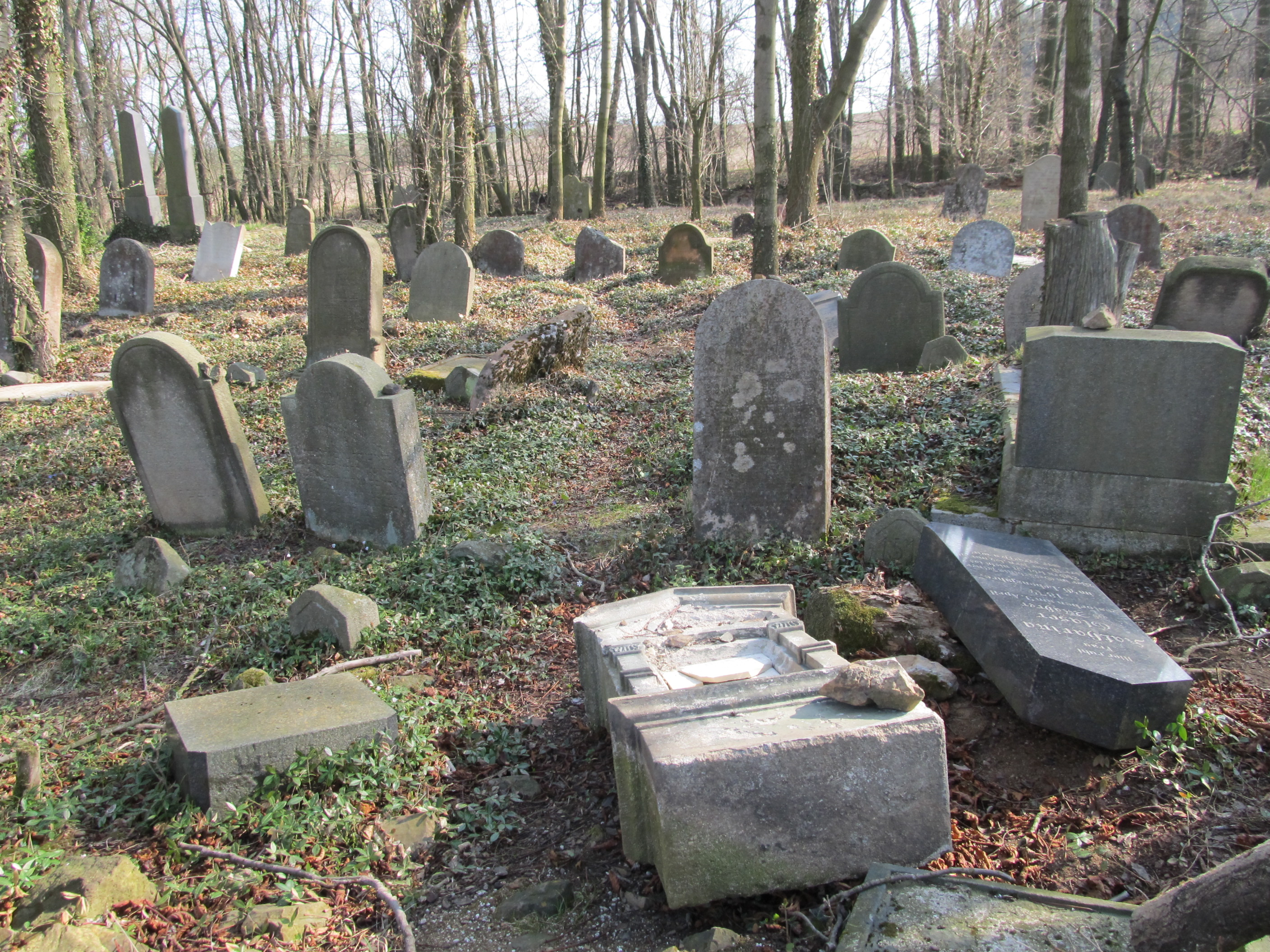
Jewish cemetery

The first written mention of Terešov is from 1361.

The Jewish cemetery in Terešov was founded in 1623. After that, the Jewish community was established as the first in the Rokycany District. By separating from this community, other communities were formed in the district. The first synagogue in Terešov was built around 1680. The last synagogue, which was built at the turn of the 18th and 19th centuries, was demolished in 1964.

== Demographics ==
Historical population

Year	Pop.	±%
1869	944	—
1880	909	−3.7%
1890	805	−11.4%
1900	693	−13.9%
1910	658	−5.1%

Year	Pop.	±%
1921	614	−6.7%
1930	549	−10.6%
1950	384	−30.1%
1961	379	−1.3%
1970	348	−8.2%

Year	Pop.	±%
1980	258	−25.9%
1991	174	−32.6%
2001	149	−14.4%
2011	163	+9.4%
2021	199	+22.1%

Source: Censuses

== Transport ==
There are no railways or major roads passing through the municipality.

== Sights ==
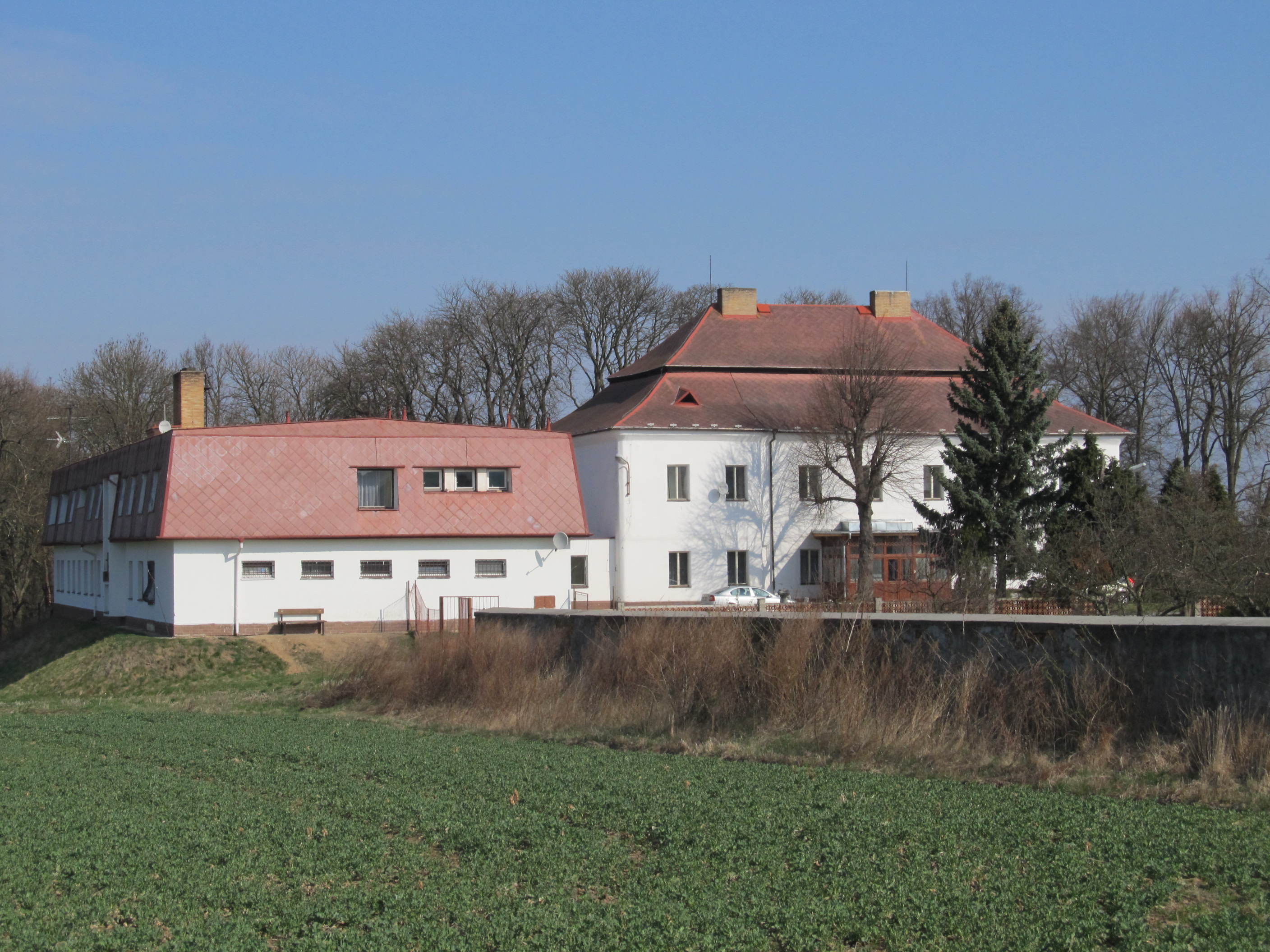
Terešov Castle

In 1723, Václav Diviš Miseroni of Lisson, the then owner of Terešov, had built a small Baroque castle. It is a simple one-storey building with mansard roof. Today, it houses a detention institute for youth.

The stone road bridge in the centre of Terešov is a cultural monument. It is a 28 m (92 ft) long bridge from the early 19th century.

The Jewish cemetery is preserved until today. It is located near the village of Bílá Skála. It has an area of approximately 4,100 m^{2} (44,000 sq ft) with around 300 tombstones. The oldest preserved tombstones dates from the period 1725–1729. The wall of the cemetery is partly in ruins.
