= Drahouš =

- Municipality
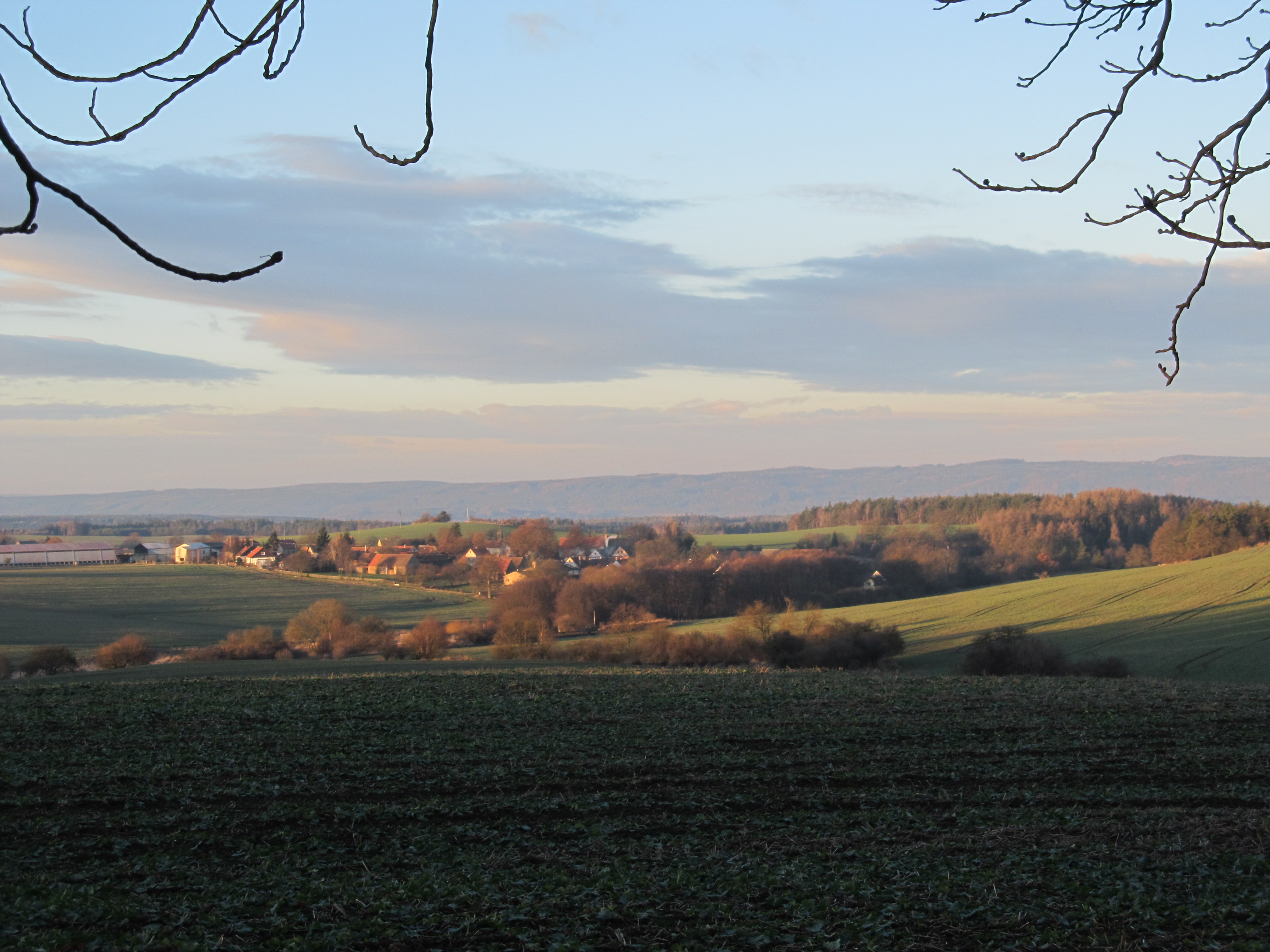
- View from the east

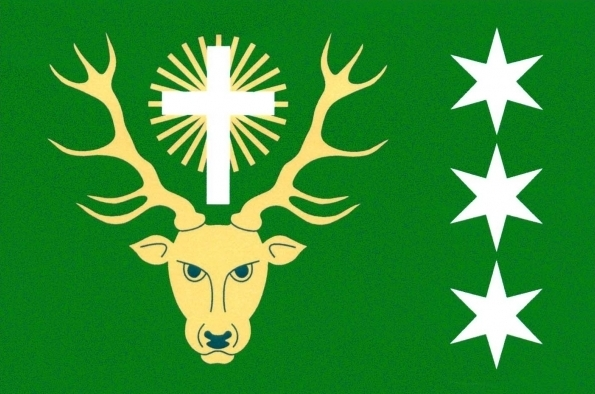
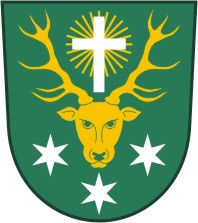
- Flag Coat of arms

- Location in the Czech Republic
- Coordinates: 50°4′49″N 13°28′33″E
- Country: Czech Republic
- Region: Central Bohemian
- District: Rakovník
- First mentioned: 1404

Area
  - Total: 14.80 km^{2} (5.71 sq mi)
- Elevation: 530 m (1,740 ft)

Population (2026-01-01)
  - Total: 79
  - Density: 5.3/km^{2} (14/sq mi)
- Time zone: UTC+1 (CET)
  - Summer (DST): UTC+2 (CEST)
- Postal code: 270 33
- Website: www.drahous.cz

Drahouš is a municipality and village in Rakovník District in the Central Bohemian Region of the Czech Republic. It has about 80 inhabitants.

== Administrative division ==
Drahouš consists of three municipal parts (in brackets population according to the 2021 census):

- Drahouš (36)
- Svatý Hubert (2)
- Tlestky (24)

== Geography ==
Drahouš is located about 18 kilometres (11 mi) west of Rakovník and 60 km (37 mi) west of Prague. It lies in the Rakovník Uplands. The highest point is the hill Plavečský vrch at 603 m (1,978 ft) above sea level. The stream Rakovnický potok originates in the municipal territory.

== History ==
The first written mention of Drahouš is from 1404. Tlestky was first mentioned in 1419.

== Demographics ==
Historical population

| Year | Pop. | ±% |
|---|---|---|
| 1869 | 365 | — |
| 1880 | 346 | −5.2% |
| 1890 | 296 | −14.5% |
| 1900 | 279 | −5.7% |
| 1910 | 288 | +3.2% |

| Year | Pop. | ±% |
|---|---|---|
| 1921 | 274 | −4.9% |
| 1930 | 311 | +13.5% |
| 1950 | 207 | −33.4% |
| 1961 | 135 | −34.8% |
| 1970 | 136 | +0.7% |

| Year | Pop. | ±% |
|---|---|---|
| 1980 | 125 | −8.1% |
| 1991 | 86 | −31.2% |
| 2001 | 63 | −26.7% |
| 2011 | 64 | +1.6% |
| 2021 | 62 | −3.1% |

Source: Censuses

== Transport ==
The I/27 road (the section from Plzeň to Most) runs through the municipality.

== Sights ==
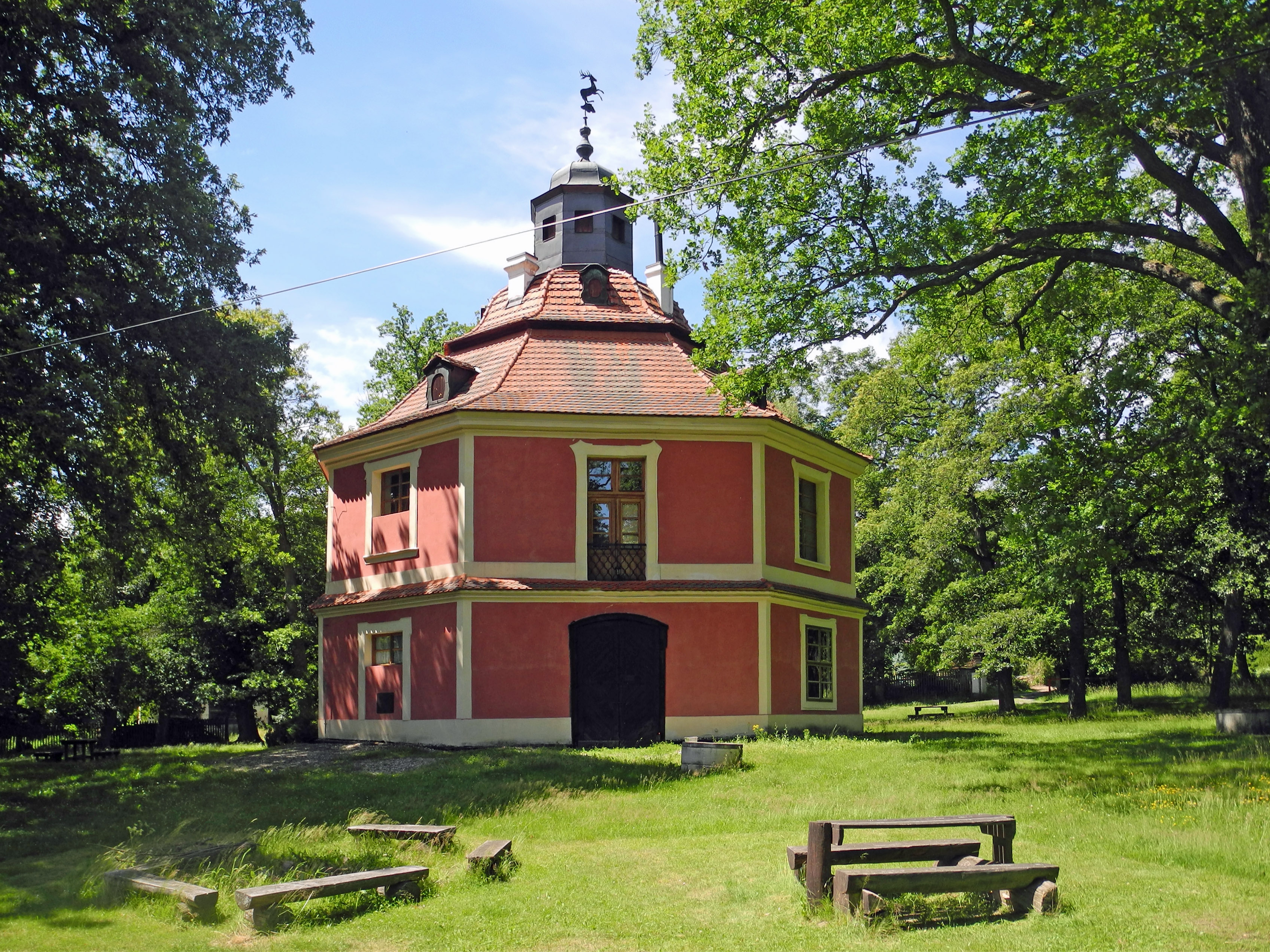
Svatý Hubert hunting lodge

Svatý Hubert is a complex of Baroque and Neoclassical buildings with an octagonal hunting lodge from the 18th century in its centre. It was built for the Czernin family in the middle of the former fallow deer park. Near Svatý Hubert is Plaveč, a Baroque summer house that belonged to the hunting lodge.

In the centre of Drahouš is the Chapel of Saint John of Nepomuk. This Baroque chapel was rebuilt into its current form in 1852.
