= Jesenice (Rakovník District) =

- Town
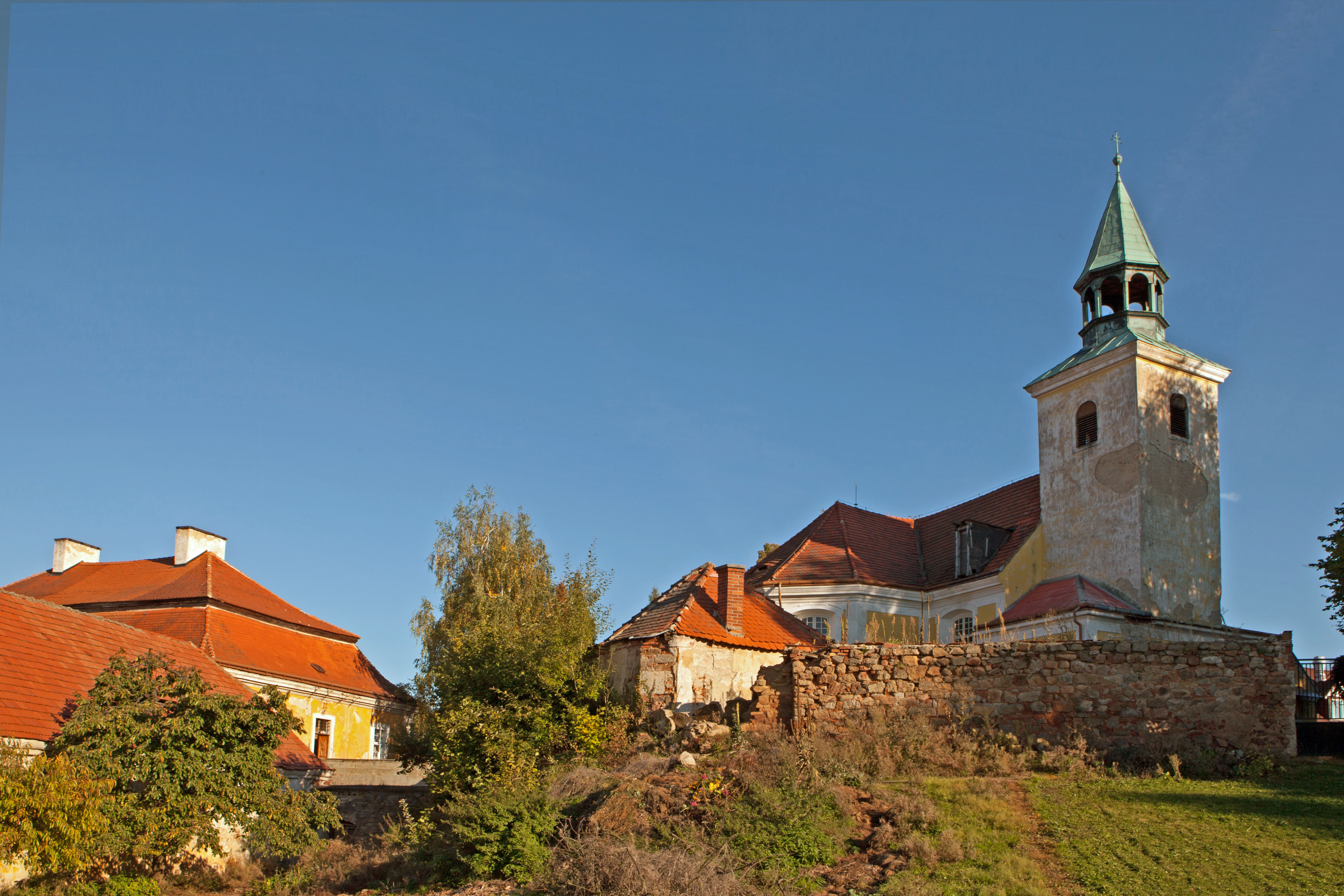
- Church of Saints Peter and Paul

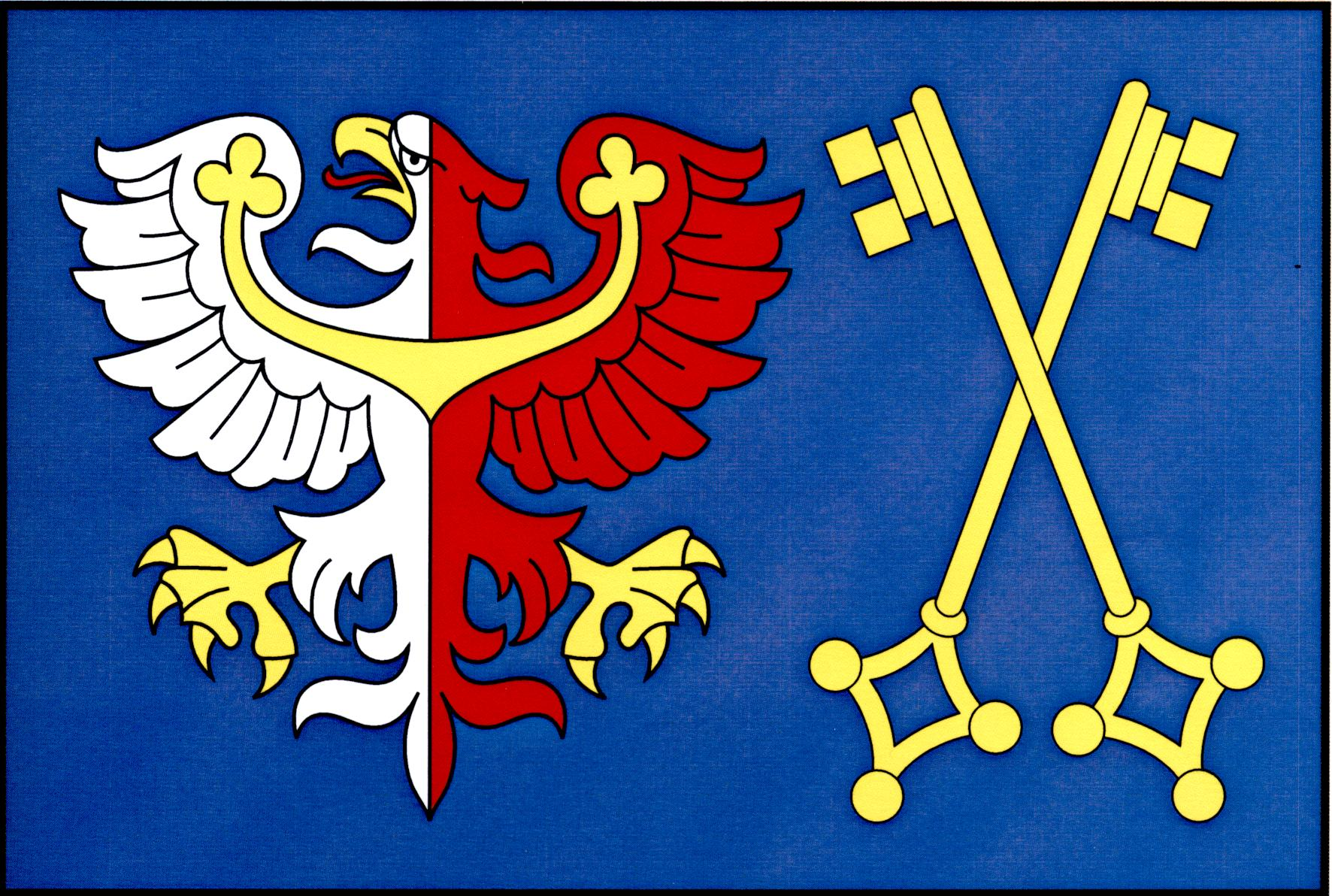
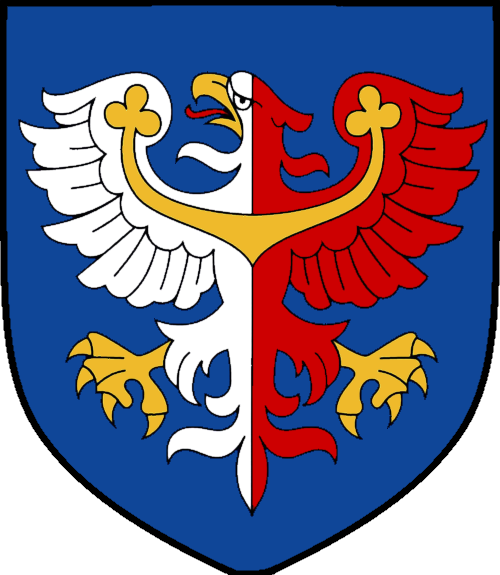
- Flag Coat of arms

- Location in the Czech Republic
- Coordinates: 50°5′50″N 13°28′10″E
- Country: Czech Republic
- Region: Central Bohemian
- District: Rakovník
- First mentioned: 1321

Government
  - Mayor: Jan Polák

Area
  - Total: 37.59 km^{2} (14.51 sq mi)
- Elevation: 455 m (1,493 ft)

Population (2026-01-01)
  - Total: 1,638
  - Density: 43.58/km^{2} (112.9/sq mi)
- Time zone: UTC+1 (CET)
  - Summer (DST): UTC+2 (CEST)
- Postal code: 270 33
- Website: www.jesenice-ra.cz

Jesenice (Czech pronunciation: [ˈjɛsɛɲɪtsɛ]; German: Jechnitz) is a town in Rakovník District in the Central Bohemian Region of the Czech Republic. It has about 1,600 inhabitants.

== Administrative division ==
Jesenice consists of six municipal parts (in brackets population according to the 2021 census):

- Jesenice (1,497)
- Bedlno (15)
- Chotěšov (39)
- Kosobody (22)
- Podbořánky (30)
- Soseň (14)

Podbořánky forms an exclave of the municipal territory.

== Etymology ==
The name is derived from the Czech adjective jesenná (from jasan, i.e. 'ash') and originally denoted a meadow between ash trees or water flowing between ash trees.

== Geography ==
Jesenice is located about 18 kilometres (11 mi) west of Rakovník and 60 km (37 mi) west of Prague. It lies in the Rakovník Uplands. The highest point is the hill Obecní vrch at 589 m (1,932 ft) above sea level. The stream Rakovnický potok flows through the municipality and supplies a system of fishponds there.

== History ==
The first written mention of Jesenice is from 1321. It was probably founded in the 13th century. From the end of the 14th century until 1848, Jesenice was part of the Petrohrad estate. The village was promoted to a town in 1409. At the end of the 15th century, a system of ponds was established here and fish farming began. Jesenice reached its greatest boom at the turn of the 19th and 20th centuries. After it lost its town status after World War II, Jesenice became a town once again in 2008.

== Demographics ==
Historical population

Year	Pop.	±%
1869	2,262	—
1880	2,480	+9.6%
1890	2,333	−5.9%
1900	2,206	−5.4%
1910	2,251	+2.0%

Year	Pop.	±%
1921	2,198	−2.4%
1930	2,446	+11.3%
1950	1,599	−34.6%
1961	1,823	+14.0%
1970	1,756	−3.7%

Year	Pop.	±%
1980	1,693	−3.6%
1991	1,684	−0.5%
2001	1,645	−2.3%
2011	1,761	+7.1%
2021	1,617	−8.2%

Source: Censuses

== Transport ==
Jesenice is located on the railway line Rakovník–Bečov nad Teplou.

== Sights ==
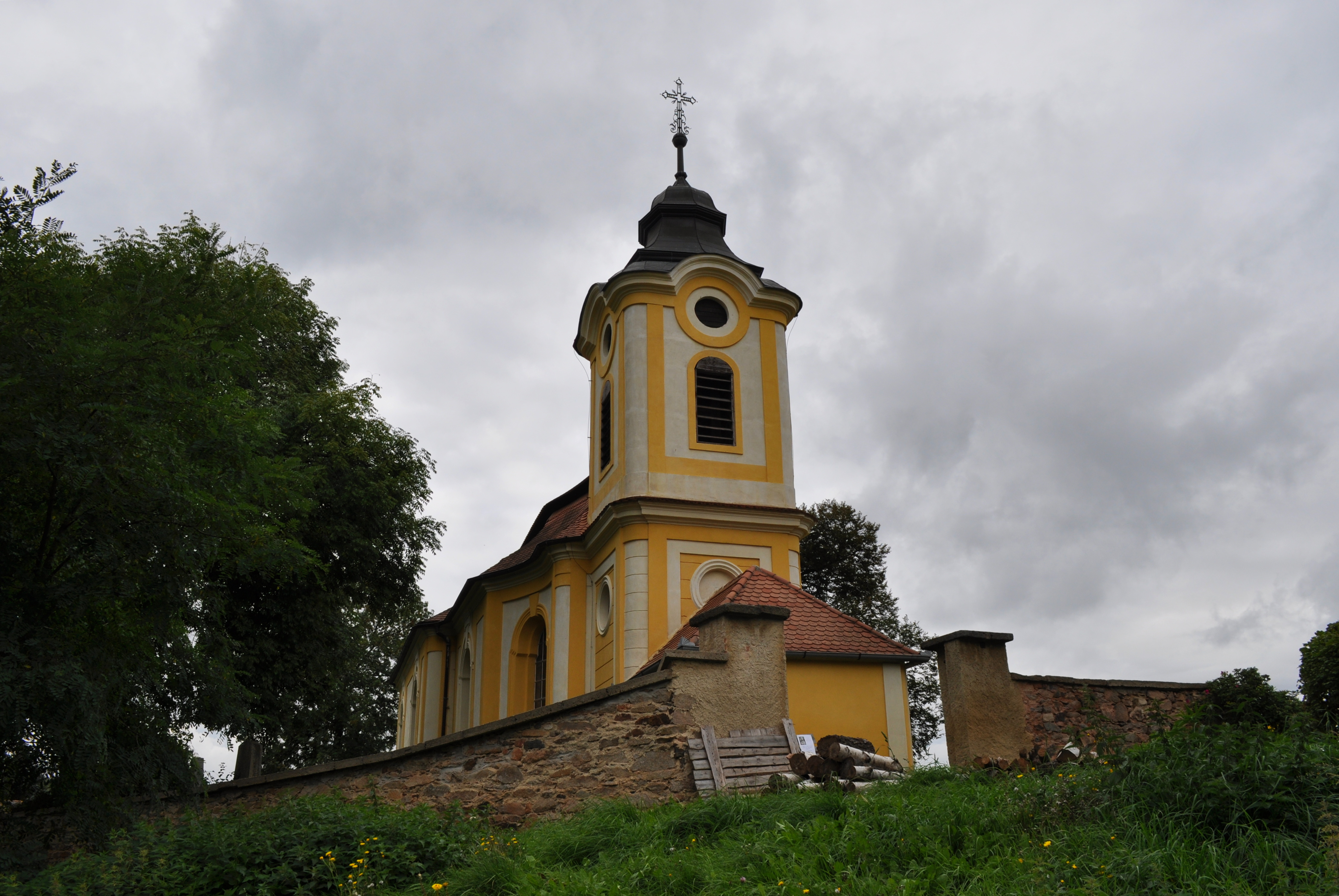
Church of Saint James the Great

The main landmark of Jesenice is the Church of Saints Peter and Paul. It was originally a fortified Romanesque church, from which the Romanesque tower has been preserved. From the 12th to the 18th century, the church was gradually modified and expanded with Baroque chapels.

The Church of Saint James the Great is located in Podbořánky. Its existence was first documented in 1367. The current appearance of the church dates from 1781, when it was rebuilt in the Baroque style. The late Baroque rectory next to the church dates from 1788.
