= Zbečno =

- Municipality
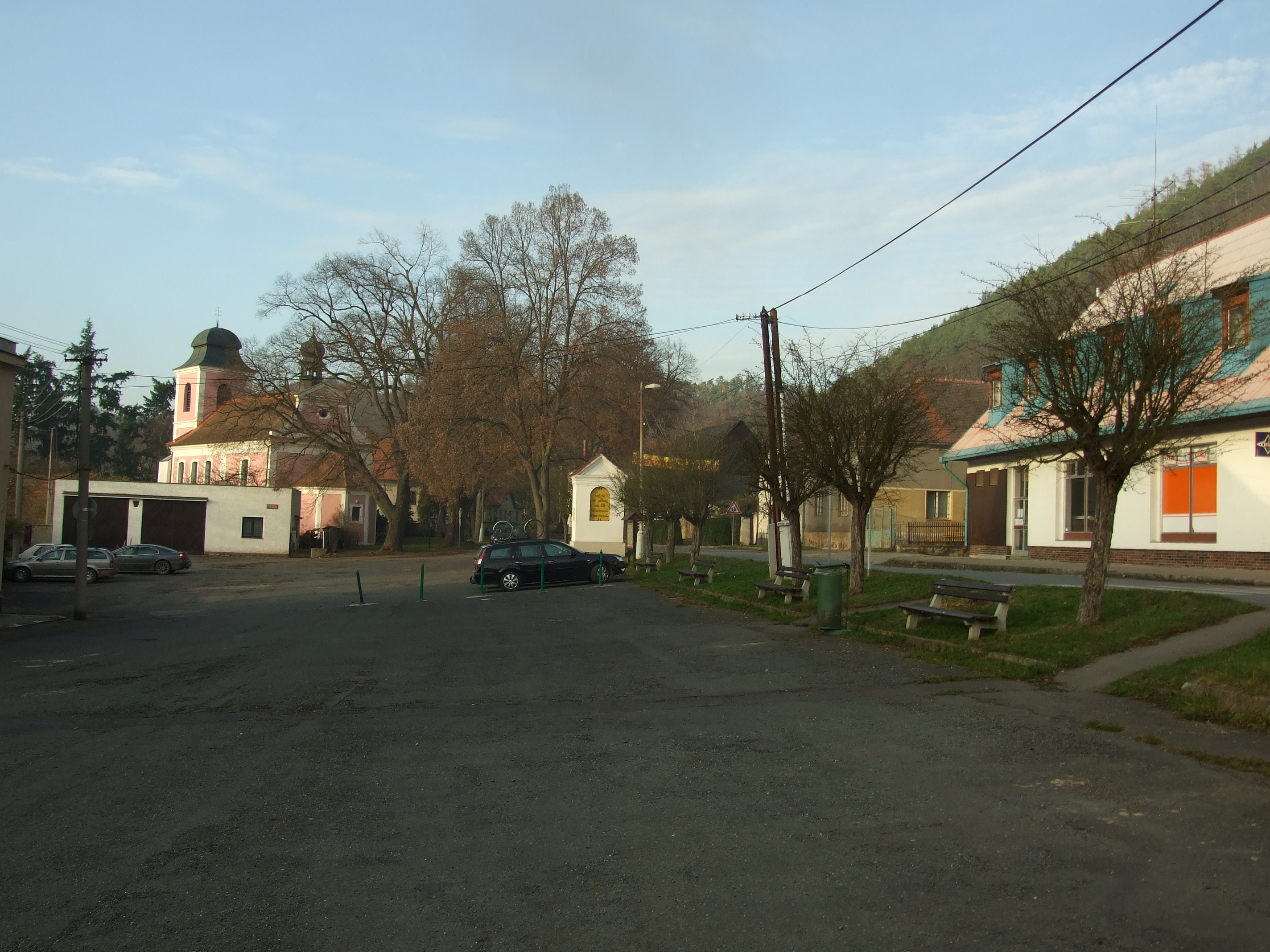
- Centre of Zbečno

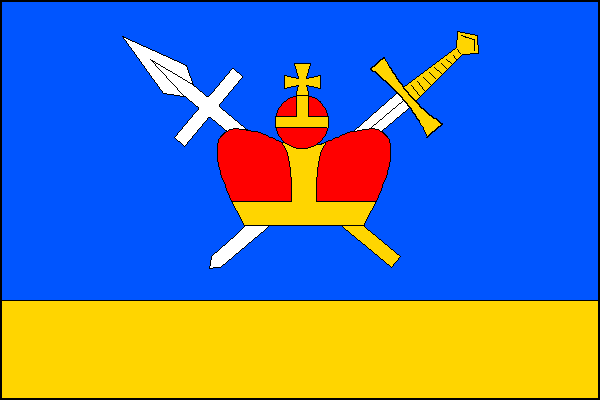
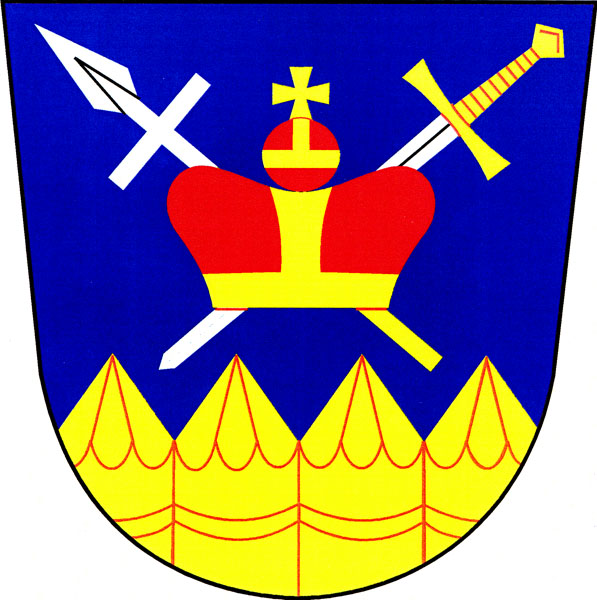
- Flag Coat of arms

- Location in the Czech Republic
- Coordinates: 50°2′31″N 13°55′14″E
- Country: Czech Republic
- Region: Central Bohemian
- District: Rakovník
- First mentioned: 1003

Area
  - Total: 15.15 km^{2} (5.85 sq mi)
- Elevation: 235 m (771 ft)

Population (2026-01-01)
  - Total: 627
  - Density: 41.4/km^{2} (107/sq mi)
- Time zone: UTC+1 (CET)
  - Summer (DST): UTC+2 (CEST)
- Postal code: 270 24
- Website: www.obeczbecno.cz

Zbečno is a municipality and village in Rakovník District in the Central Bohemian Region of the Czech Republic. It has about 600 inhabitants.

== Administrative division ==
Zbečno consists of two municipal parts (in brackets population according to the 2021 census):

- Zbečno (311)
- Újezd nad Zbečnem (272)

== Etymology ==
The initial name of the village was Stbečna. The origin of the name is unclear. It could be derived from the word stéblo ('stalk') or from the old word jistba, which denoted a log cabin or a type of bridge pillar.

== Geography ==
Zbečno is located about 15 kilometres (9 mi) southeast of Rakovník and 32 km (20 mi) west of Prague. It lies in the Křivoklát Highlands and within the Křivoklátsko Landscape Protected Area, which administration have its seat here.

The municipality is situated at the confluence of the Berounka River and Klíčava Stream. Klíčava Reservoir is located on the Klíčava Stream in the northernmost part of the municipal territory.

== History ==
The first written mention of Zbečno is from 1003. After the Křivoklát Castle was built, it became part of the Křivoklát estate.

At the beginning of the 16th century, Zbečno was promoted to a market town by King Vladislaus II, but it was severely damaged in the Thirty Years' War and in the second half of the 17th century, it was again only a village. In 1685, Zbečno was bought by the Waldstein family and ceased to be a royal property.

In 1950–1953, Klíčava Reservoir was built, and Zbečov became a centre of tourism.

== Demographics ==
Historical population

Year	Pop.	±%
1869	1,310	—
1880	1,297	−1.0%
1890	1,256	−3.2%
1900	1,224	−2.5%
1910	1,270	+3.8%

Year	Pop.	±%
1921	1,242	−2.2%
1930	1,270	+2.3%
1950	1,327	+4.5%
1961	846	−36.2%
1970	734	−13.2%

Year	Pop.	±%
1980	586	−20.2%
1991	472	−19.5%
2001	437	−7.4%
2011	480	+9.8%
2021	583	+21.5%

Source: Censuses

== Transport ==
Zbečno is located on the railway line Beroun–Rakovník. The municipality is served by two train stations: Zbečno and Újezd nad Zbečnem.

== Sights ==
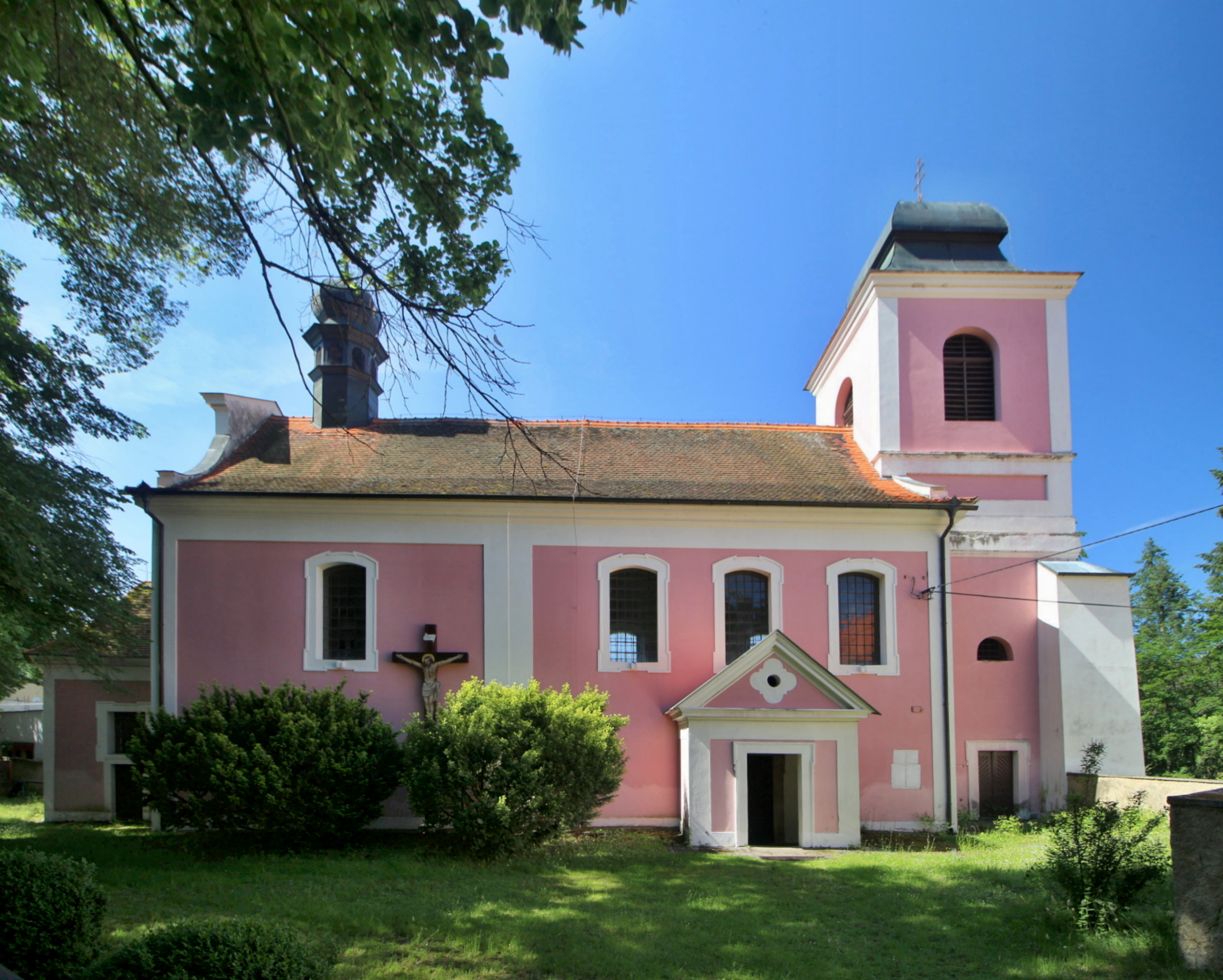
Church of Saint Martin

The main landmark of Zbečno is the Church of Saint Martin. The original Romanesque church probably existed already at the end of the 11th century. It was rebuilt in the Gothic style in the 1470s. In 1714–1716, the church was rebuilt into its current Baroque form.
