= Kateřina Jalovcová =

Czech operatic mezzo-soprano (born 1978)

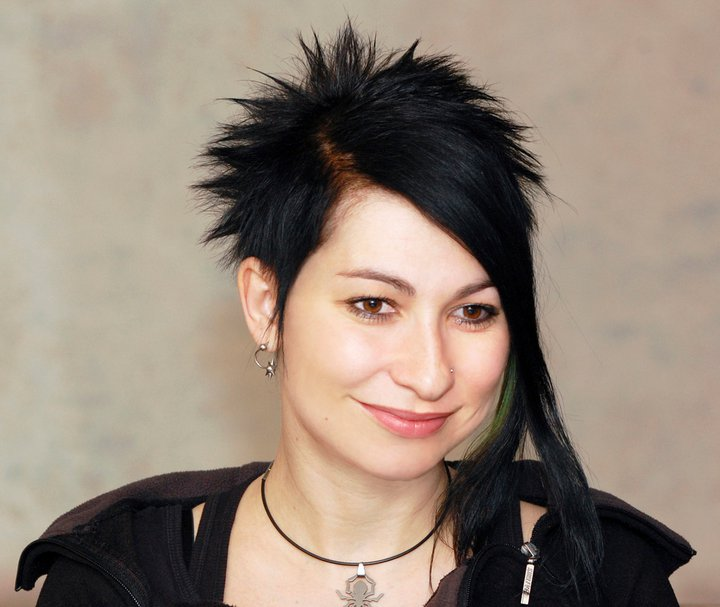
Kateřina Jalovcová (2011)

Kateřina Jalovcová (born 1978 in Rakovník) is a Czech operatic mezzo-soprano who has had an active international career since 2004. She is a principal singer at the National Theatre in Prague.

== Career ==
Jalovcová is a graduate of the Prague Conservatory where she studied voice under Brigita Šulcová. In 2004 she joined the roster of principal artists at the Liberec Theatre, singing roles there for two years. During this time she also worked as a guest artist at the National Theatre in Prague and the Moravian Theatre Olomouc. Among the roles she portrayed during these years were Azucena in Verdi's Il trovatore, Ulrica in Verdi's Un ballo in maschera, Preziosilla in Verdi's La forza del destino, Siebel in Gounod's Faust, and Fyodor in Mussorgsky's Boris Godunov.

In 2006 Jalovcová became a principal singer at the National Theatre, and has since performed a wide variety of roles at that house. Among the roles she has sung in Prague are, Annio in Mozart's La clemenza di Tito, Cherubino in Mozart's Le nozze di Figaro, Dalila in Saint-Saëns's Samson et Dalila, Kate in Dvořák's The Devil and Kate, Meg Page in Verdi's Falstaff, Olga in Tchaikovsky's Eugene Onegin, the Shepherdess in Janáček's Jenůfa, and Turnspit in Dvořák's Rusalka.

In June 2007, Jalovcová was honored with the Most Talented Young Singer award at the Wexford Festival Opera for her portrayal of the Witch in Rusalka. She returned to Wexford the following year to portray Lel in Rimsky-Korsakov's The Snow Maiden with conductor Dmitri Jurowski. She has also made appearances at Oper Graz in the roles of Suzuki in Puccini's Madama Butterfly and Fenena in Nabucco.

On the concert stage Jalovcová has appeared in concert with the Prague Symphony Orchestra on a number of occasions, most notably singing Jocaste in Stravinsky's oratorio Oedipus Rex and performing as a feature soloist in Dvořák's Requiem under the baton of Jiří Kout.
