= Pšovlky =

- Municipality
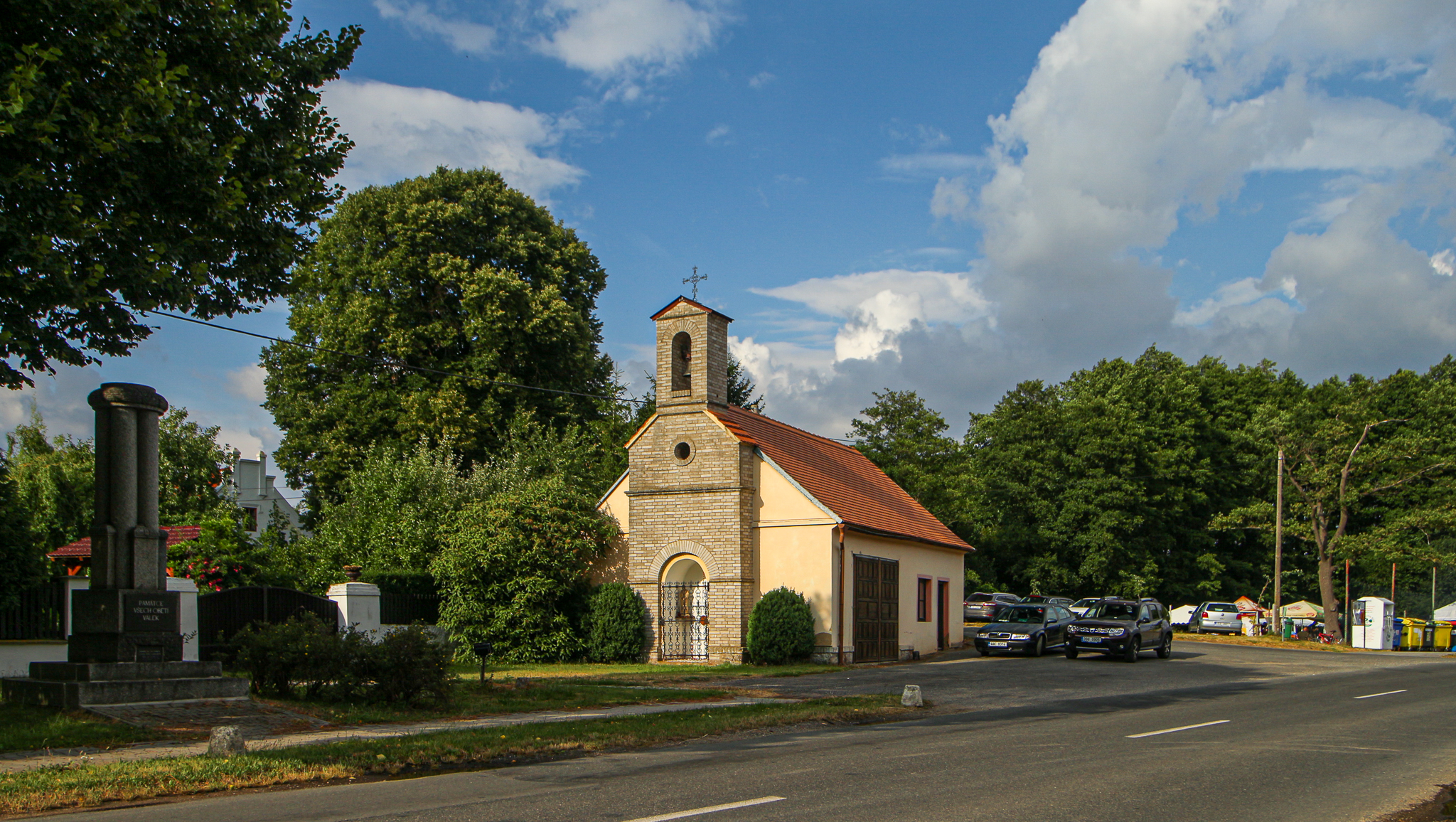
- Belfry by the main road

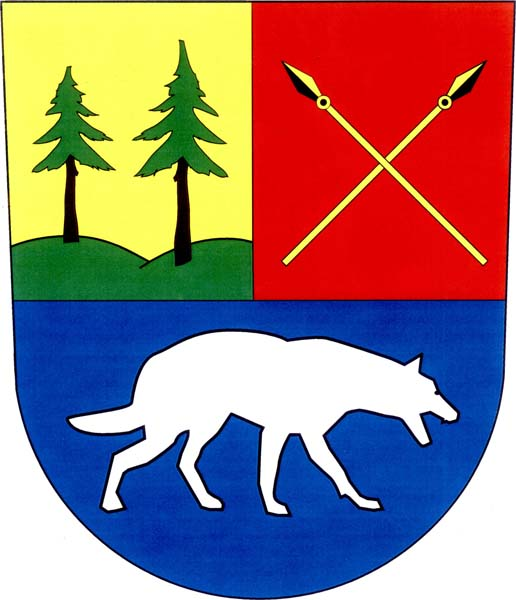
- Coat of arms

- Location in the Czech Republic
- Coordinates: 50°6′31″N 13°35′29″E
- Country: Czech Republic
- Region: Central Bohemian
- District: Rakovník
- First mentioned: 1273

Area
  - Total: 10.58 km^{2} (4.08 sq mi)
- Elevation: 362 m (1,188 ft)

Population (2026-01-01)
  - Total: 259
  - Density: 24.5/km^{2} (63.4/sq mi)
- Time zone: UTC+1 (CET)
  - Summer (DST): UTC+2 (CEST)
- Postal code: 270 31
- Website: www.psovlky.cz

Pšovlky is a municipality and village in Rakovník District in the Central Bohemian Region of the Czech Republic. It has about 300 inhabitants.

== Demographics ==
Historical population
Year	Pop.	±%
1869	389	—
1880	435	+11.8%
1890	439	+0.9%
1900	444	+1.1%
1910	464	+4.5%
1921	501	+8.0%
1930	513	+2.4%
1950	311	−39.4%
1961	317	+1.9%
1970	282	−11.0%
1980	267	−5.3%
1991	238	−10.9%
2001	246	+3.4%
2011	308	+25.2%
2021	266	−13.6%
Source: Censuses
