= Oráčov =

- Municipality
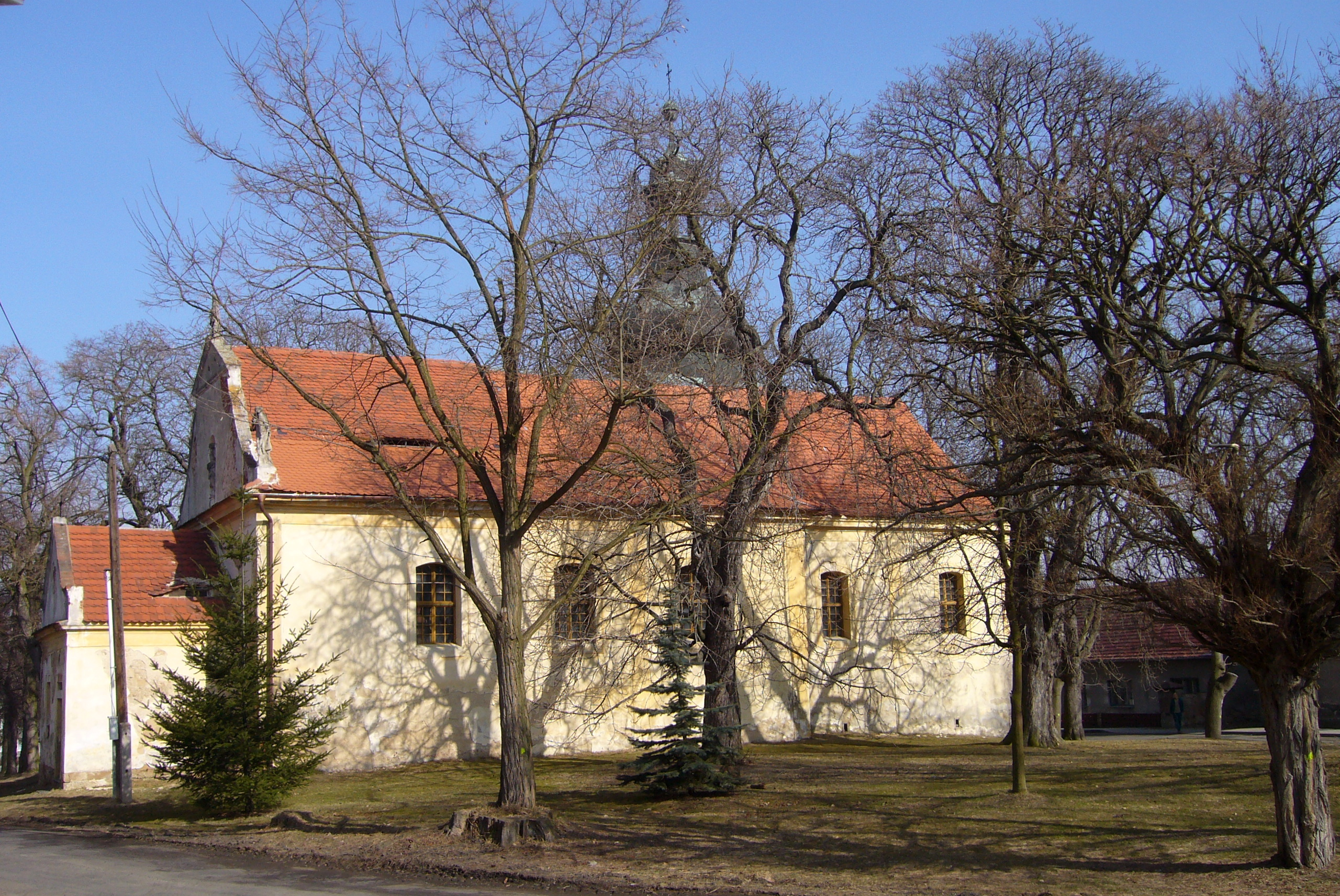
- Church of Saint James the Great

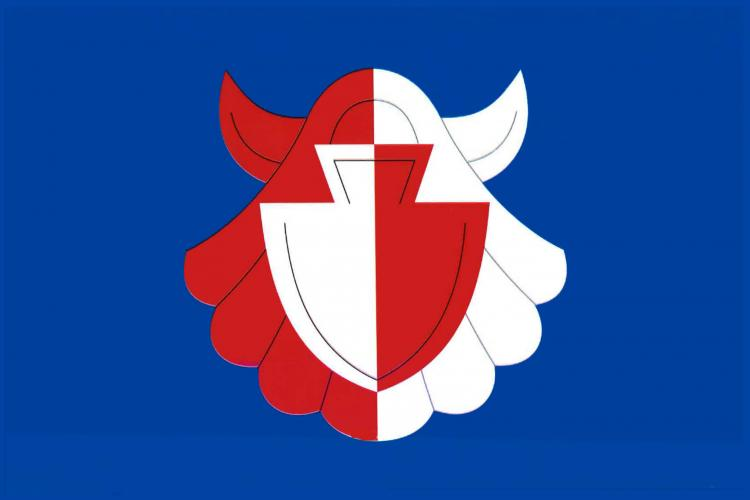
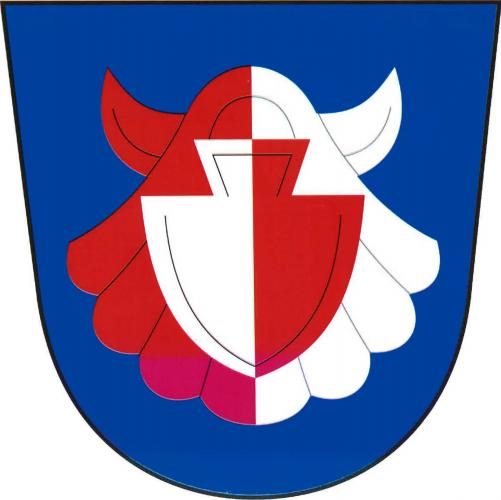
- Flag Coat of arms

- Location in the Czech Republic
- Coordinates: 50°6′42″N 13°32′56″E
- Country: Czech Republic
- Region: Central Bohemian
- District: Rakovník
- First mentioned: 1295

Area
  - Total: 16.04 km^{2} (6.19 sq mi)
- Elevation: 393 m (1,289 ft)

Population (2026-01-01)
  - Total: 389
  - Density: 24.3/km^{2} (62.8/sq mi)
- Time zone: UTC+1 (CET)
  - Summer (DST): UTC+2 (CEST)
- Postal code: 270 32
- Website: www.oracov.cz

Oráčov (German: Woratschen) is a municipality and village in Rakovník District in the Central Bohemian Region of the Czech Republic. It has about 400 inhabitants.

== Administrative division ==
Oráčov consists of two municipal parts (in brackets population according to the 2021 census):

- Oráčov (769)
- Klečetné (32)

== Demographics ==
Historical population
Year	Pop.	±%
1869	681	—
1880	746	+9.5%
1890	663	−11.1%
1900	725	+9.4%
1910	716	−1.2%
1921	733	+2.4%
1930	807	+10.1%
1950	519	−35.7%
1961	506	−2.5%
1970	469	−7.3%
1980	447	−4.7%
1991	405	−9.4%
2001	359	−11.4%
2011	747	+108.1%
2021	801	+7.2%
Source: Censuses
