= Krty =

- Municipality
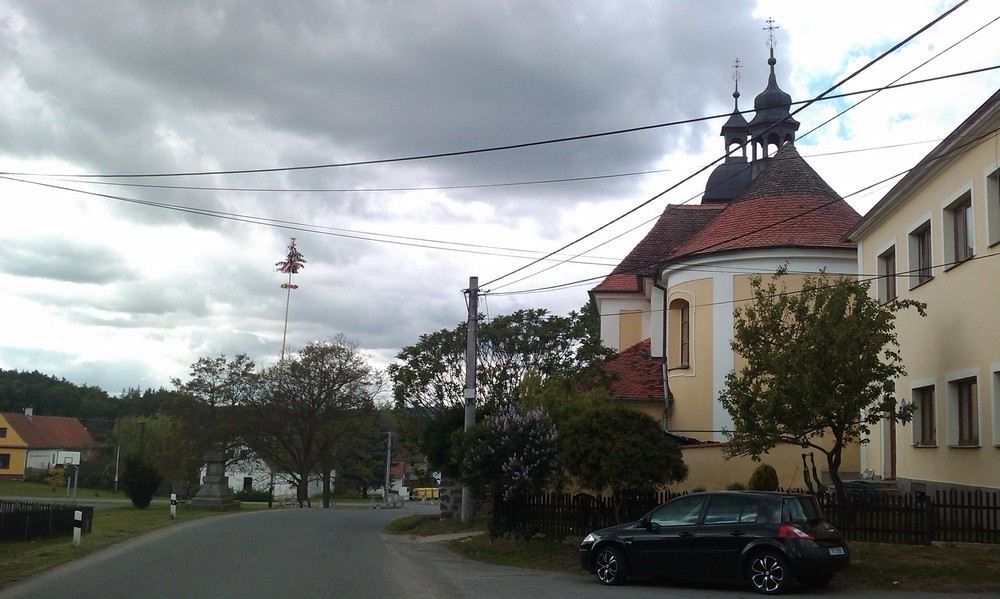
- Centre of Krty

- Location in the Czech Republic
- Coordinates: 50°5′30″N 13°25′55″E
- Country: Czech Republic
- Region: Central Bohemian
- District: Rakovník
- First mentioned: 1227

Area
  - Total: 8.66 km^{2} (3.34 sq mi)
- Elevation: 439 m (1,440 ft)

Population (2026-01-01)
  - Total: 123
  - Density: 14.2/km^{2} (36.8/sq mi)
- Time zone: UTC+1 (CET)
  - Summer (DST): UTC+2 (CEST)
- Postal code: 270 33
- Website: www.krty.cz

Krty is a municipality and village in Rakovník District in the Central Bohemian Region of the Czech Republic. It has about 100 inhabitants.

== Demographics ==
Historical population
Year	Pop.	±%
1869	382	—
1880	357	−6.5%
1890	331	−7.3%
1900	328	−0.9%
1910	379	+15.5%
1921	382	+0.8%
1930	382	+0.0%
1950	247	−35.3%
1961	223	−9.7%
1970	214	−4.0%
1980	144	−32.7%
1991	106	−26.4%
2001	100	−5.7%
2011	94	−6.0%
2021	110	+17.0%
Source: Censuses
