= Křivoklátsko Protected Landscape Area =

Protected landscape area of the Czech Republic

- IUCN category V (protected landscape/seascape)
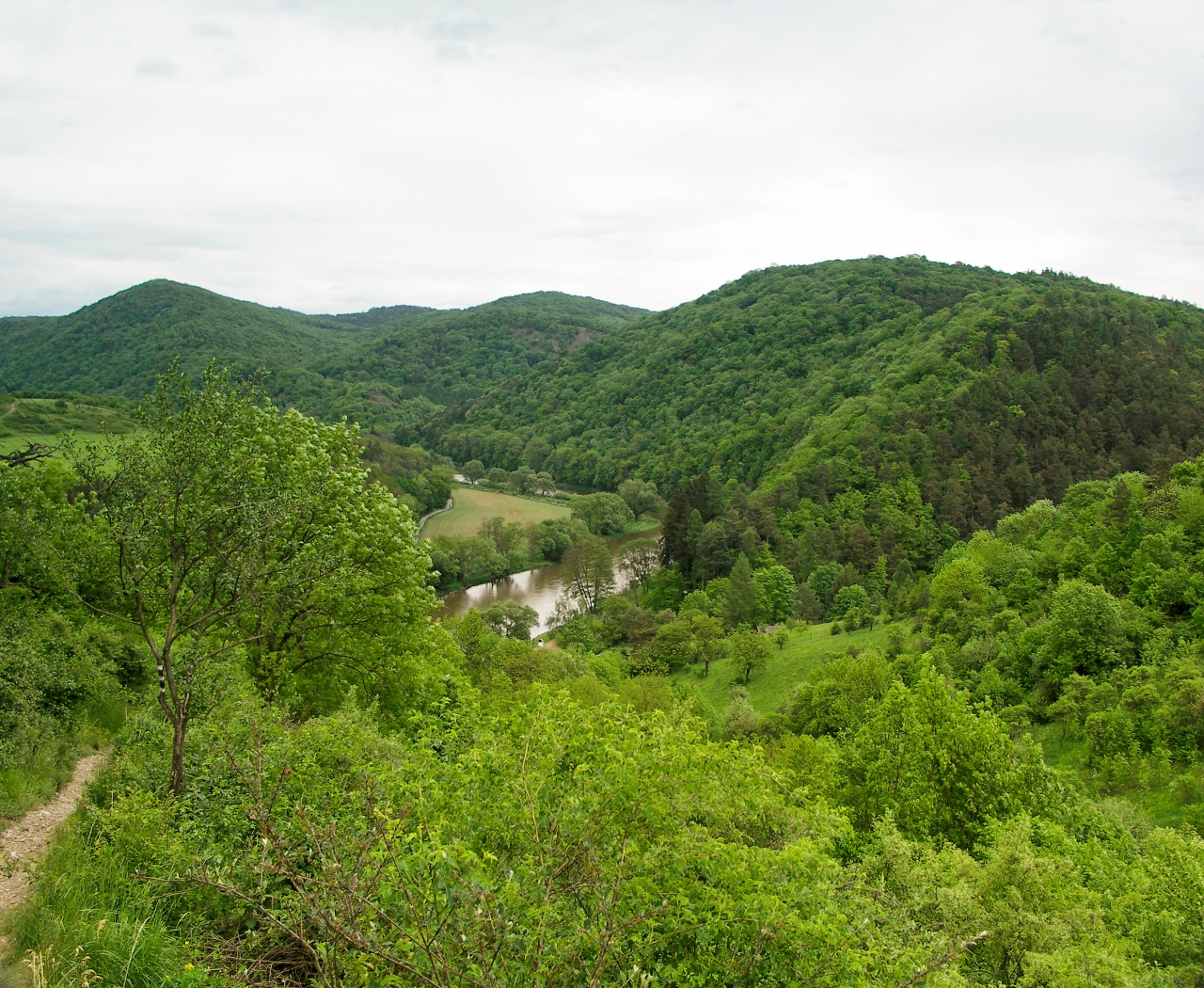
- Týřov reserve in central Křivoklátsko

- Location of Křivoklátsko PLA in the Czech Republic
- Location: Czech Republic
- Coordinates: 49°59′N 13°52′E
- Area: 624.92 km^{2} (241.28 sq mi)
- Max. elevation: 617 m (2,024 ft)
- Min. elevation: 223 m (732 ft)
- Established: 23 January 1979
- Operator: Křivoklátsko PLA Administration
- Website: krivoklatsko.nature.cz

Křivoklátsko Protected Landscape Area (abbreviated as Křivoklátsko PLA; Czech: Chráněná krajinná oblast Křivoklátsko) is a protected landscape area in the Czech Republic.

== Geography ==
Křivoklátsko PLA lies in the western part of the Central Bohemian Region, only a small part extends into the northeastern Plzeň Region. The distance between the eastern edge of the PLA and the western edge of Prague is about 20 km (12 mi). From a geomorphological point of view, most of the PLA is situated in the Křivoklát Highlands. The western part lies in the Plasy Uplands. To a small extent, the PLA extends into the Rakovník Uplands in the north and the Hořovice Uplands in the south.

Křivoklátsko PLA covers an area of 624.92 km^{2} (241.28 sq mi). The highest point is the Těchovín hill at 617 m (2,024 ft) above sea level. The lowest point is at 223 m (732 ft).

The axis of the PLA is the Berounka River. The canyon-like river valley with preserved meanders and valley floodplain is one of the main characteristics of the area. Within the PLA, the Berounka has 17 left-sided and 15 right-sided tributaries, among which they are mainly small streams. The largest body of water is Klíčava Reservoir with an area of 72.5 km^{2} (28.0 sq mi).

== Geology ==
The oldest geological unit, which forms the geological base of about three-quarters of the PLA, is the Barrandien Upper Proterozoic. It is made up of Palaeozoic sediments (shales and siltstones) that sedimented in a vast deep sea basin.

== Vegetation ==
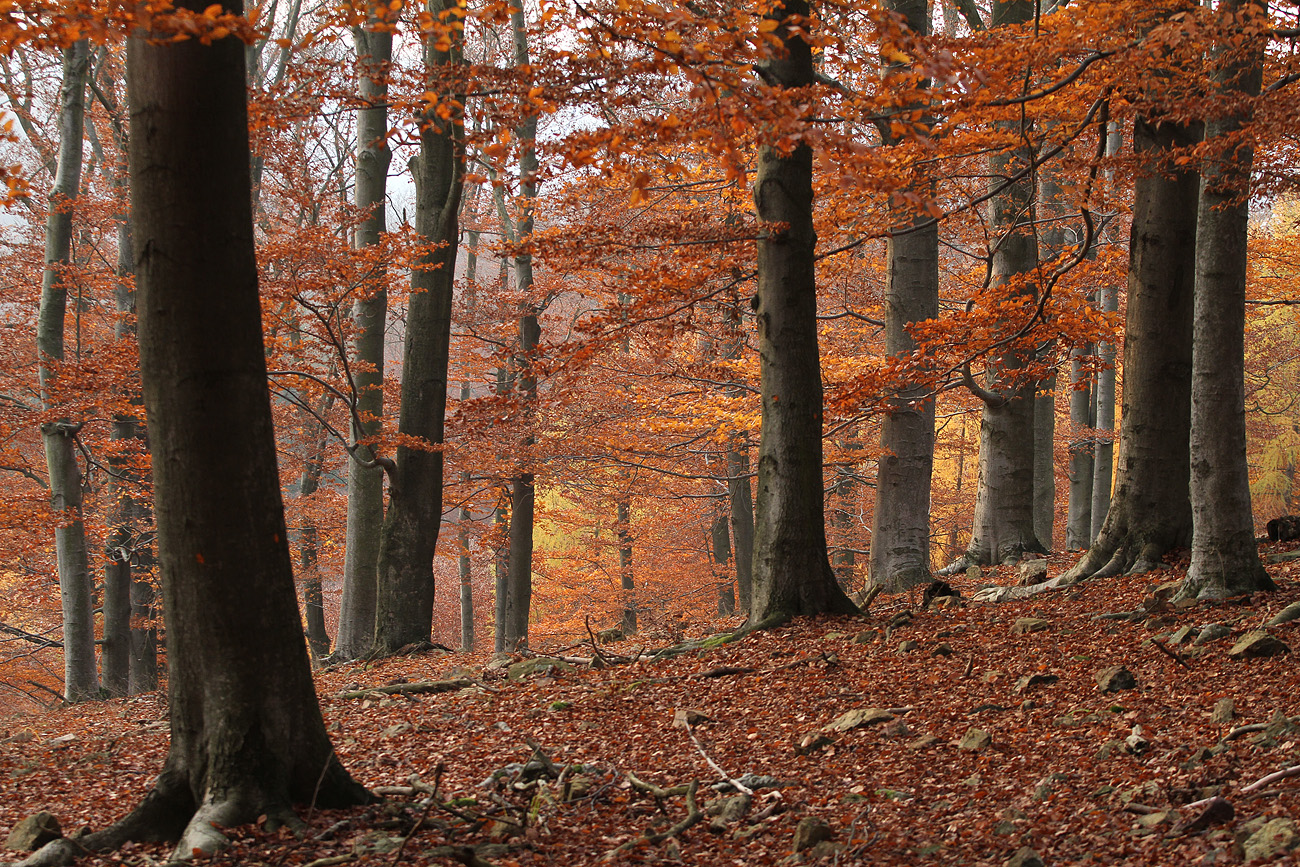
Beech forest in Křivoklátsko PLA

Almost two-thirds of the area is covered by deciduous and mixed forests. A typical feature of the area is the so-called pleš, which is a forestless area on some peaks with drought-loving lawns and shrub borders.

== Protection ==
Even before the formal demarcation of the borders, the nature area was called Křivoklátsko after the after the Křivoklát castle in the northern part of Křivoklátsko. In the Middle Ages, the Křivoklátsko forests were a royal hunting ground thanks to its proximity to Prague. The forests were therefore not logged much and remained relatively intact. In 1977, the area with a mosaic of species rich habitats, mainly large stretches of broadleaf Central European temperate forests, was included among the UNESCO biosphere reserves. Křivoklátsko PLA was declared in 1978 and the protection started on 23 January 1979.

The PLA administration is located in the municipality of Zbečno.

=== Small-scale specially protected areas ===
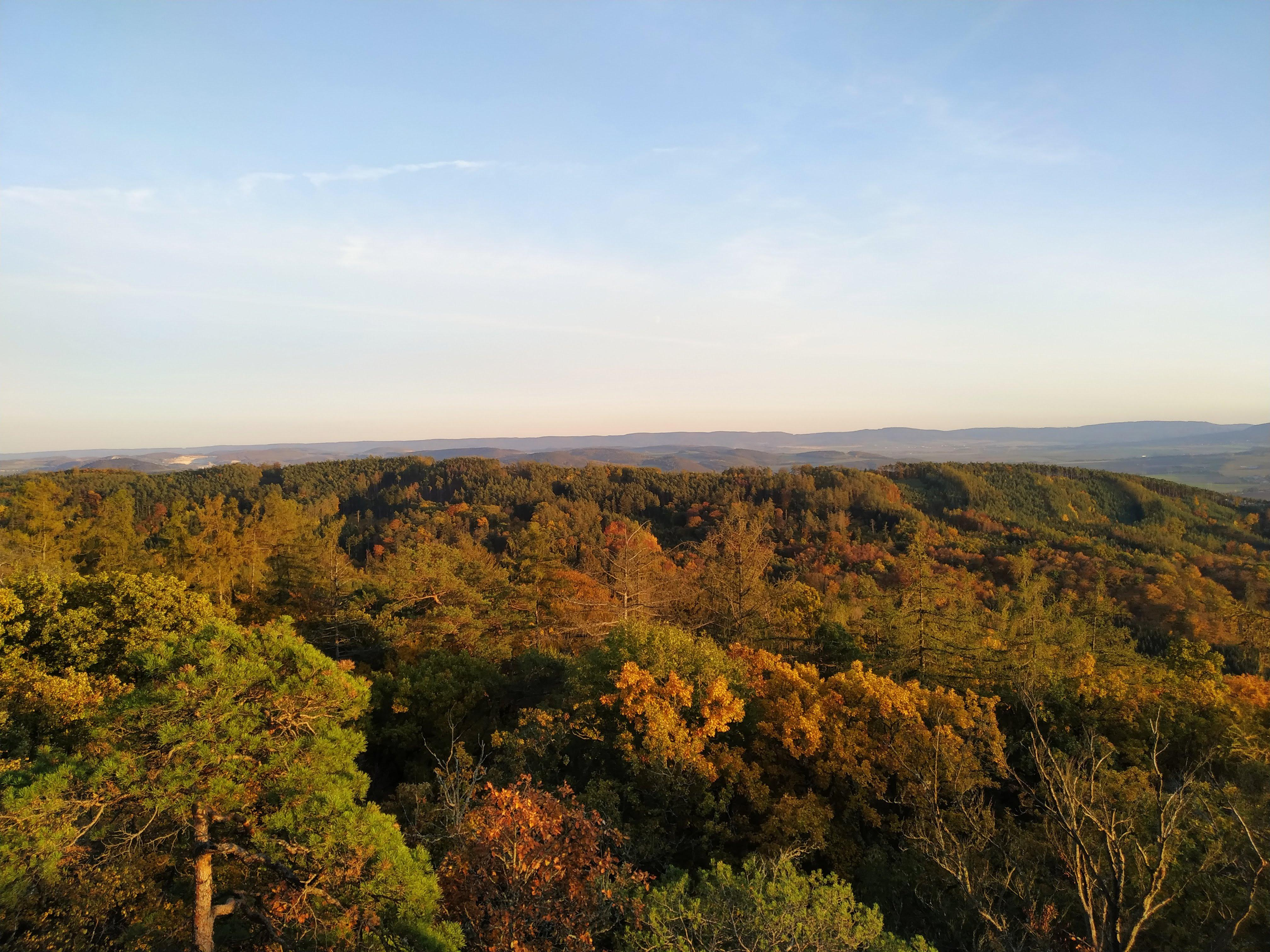
View from Vraní skála hill

Within the Křivoklátsko PLA, 27 small-scale protected areas were declared (4 national nature reserves, 16 nature reserves and 7 nature monuments):

- Kohoutov National Nature Reserve
- Týřov National Nature Reserve
- Velká Pleš National Nature Reserve
- Vůznice National Nature Reserve
- Brdatka Nature Reserve
- Čertova skála Nature Reserve
- Červený kříž Nature Reserve
- Dubensko Nature Reserve
- Jouglovka Nature Reserve
- Kabečnice Nature Reserve
- Lípa Nature Reserve
- Na Babě Nature Reserve
- Nezabudické skály Nature Reserve
- Prameny Klíčavy Nature Reserve
- Skryjská jezírka Nature Reserve
- Stříbrný luh Nature Reserve
- Svatá Alžběta Nature Reserve
- U Eremita Nature Reserve
- Vysoký Tok Nature Reserve
- Jalovce na Světovině Nature Monument
- Skryjsko-týřovické kambrium Nature Monument
- Stará ves Nature Monument
- Trubínský vrch Nature Monument
- Valachov Nature Monument
- Vraní skála Nature Monument
- Zdická skalka u Kublova Nature Monument
