= Rakovník =

Town in the Czech Republic

- Town
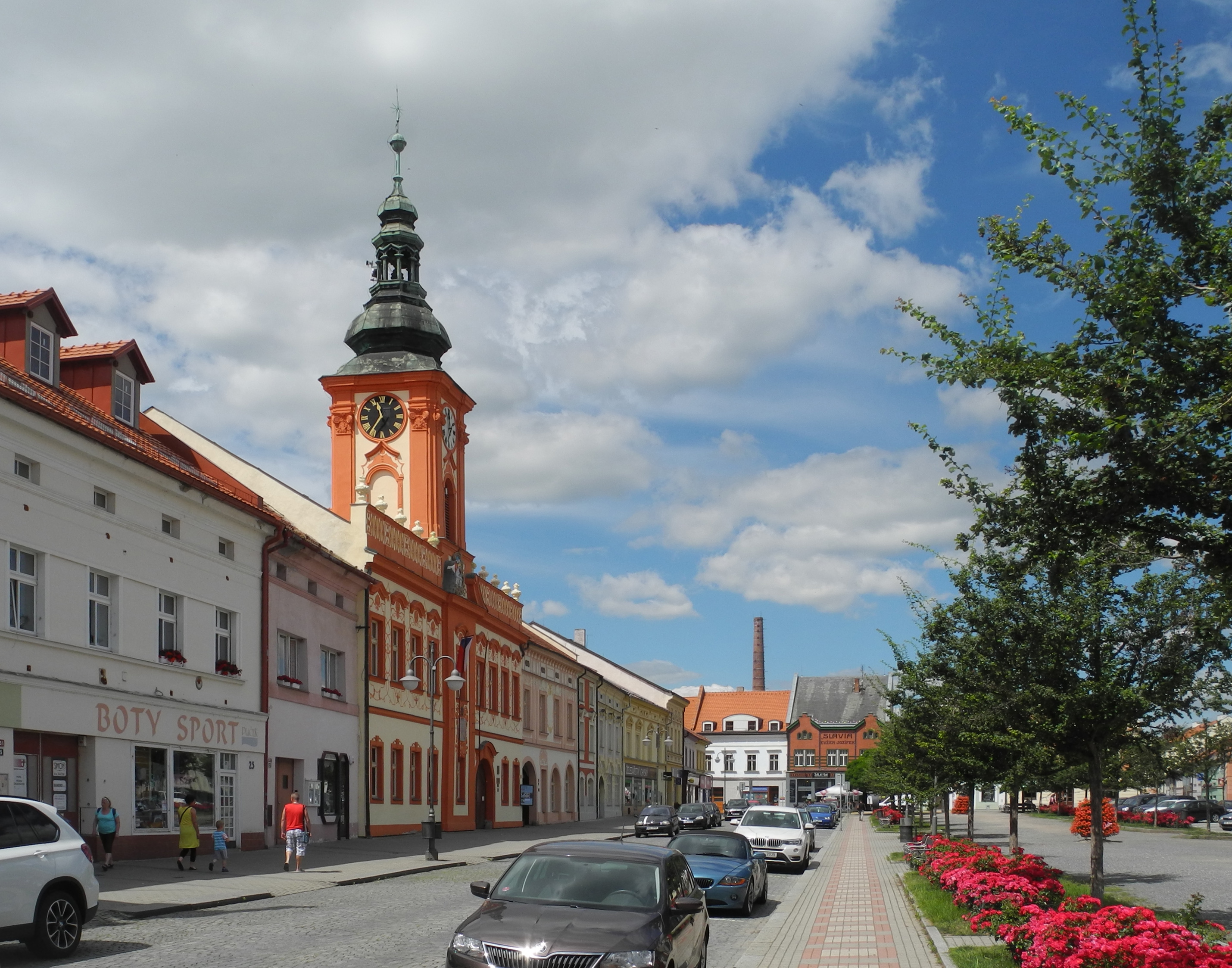
- The square Husovo náměstí

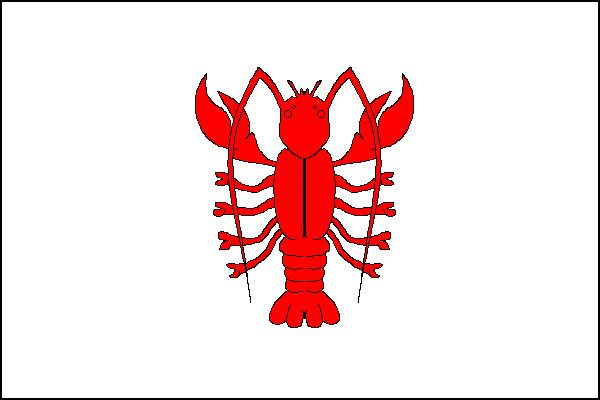
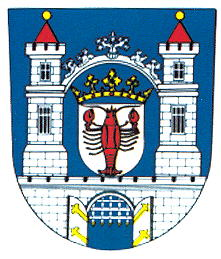
- Flag Coat of arms

- Location in the Czech Republic
- Coordinates: 50°6′14″N 13°44′0″E
- Country: Czech Republic
- Region: Central Bohemian
- District: Rakovník
- First mentioned: 1252

Government
  - Mayor: Tomáš Konopásek

Area
  - Total: 18.50 km^{2} (7.14 sq mi)
- Elevation: 322 m (1,056 ft)

Population (2026-01-01)
  - Total: 15,745
  - Density: 851.1/km^{2} (2,204/sq mi)
- Time zone: UTC+1 (CET)
  - Summer (DST): UTC+2 (CEST)
- Postal codes: 269 01, 270 36
- Website: www.mesto-rakovnik.cz

Rakovník (Czech pronunciation: [ˈrakovɲiːk]; German: Rakonitz) is a town in the Central Bohemian Region of the Czech Republic. It has about 16,000 inhabitants. The town is located on the stream Rakovnický potok in the Rakovník Uplands. It is an industrial town that grew mainly in the 20th century.

The historic town centre is well preserved and is protected as an urban monument zone. In its centre is the second longest town square in the Czech Republic. The most important monuments in Rakovník include the Church of Saint Bartholomew from the 14th century and its separate bell tower from 1495.

== Administrative division ==
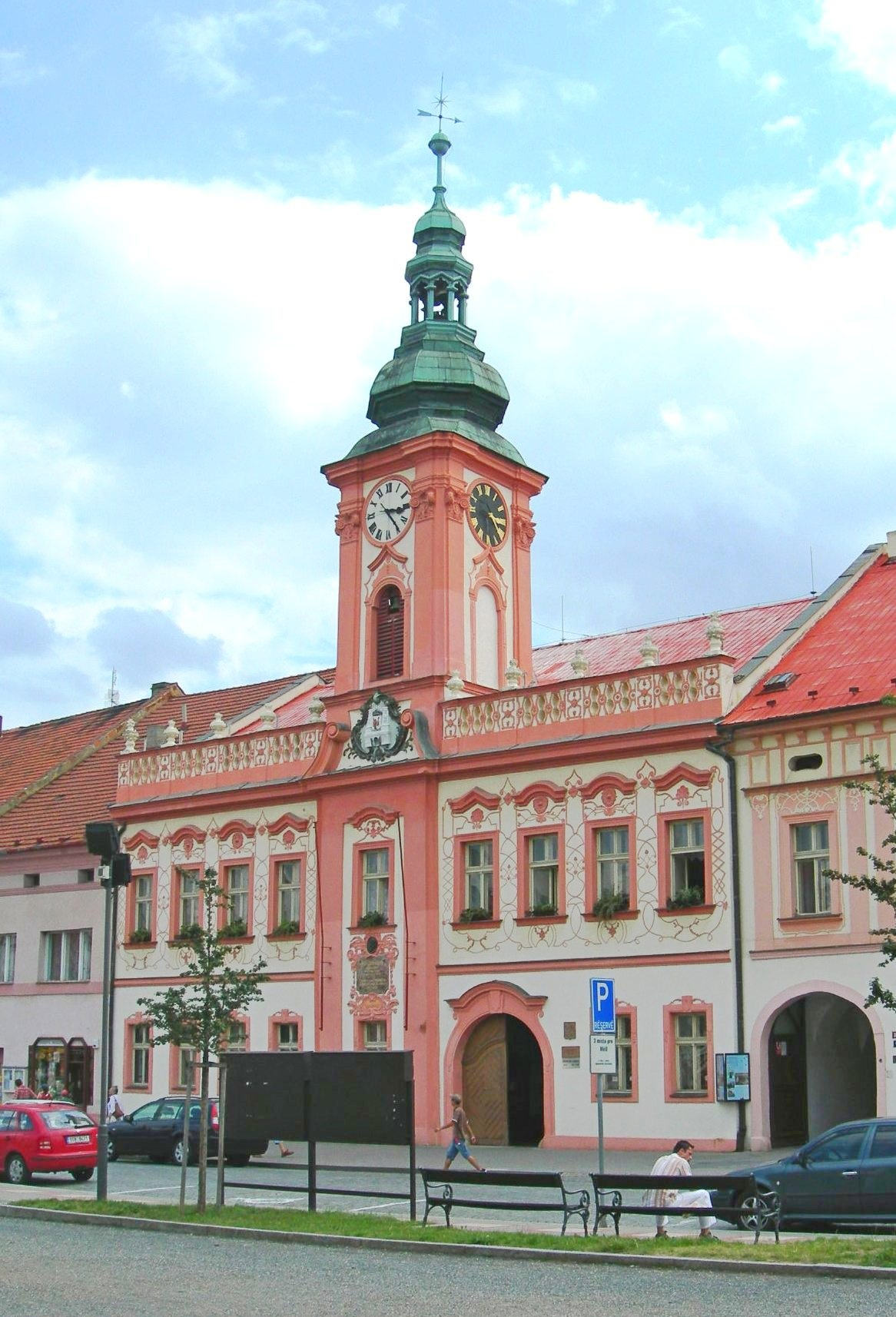
Town hall

Rakovník consists of two municipal parts (in brackets population according to the 2021 census):

- Rakovník I (871)
- Rakovník II (14,502)

== Etymology ==
According to legend, the name was derived from the Czech word rak (meaning 'crayfish'), which was eaten here during a famine. Therefore this animal was adopted on the town's coat of arms and flag. However, the name was more likely derived from type of vegetation in wetlands by a local stream, which gave the name to the stream and later to the town.

== Geography ==
Rakovník is located about 41 kilometres (25 mi) west of Prague and 45 km (28 mi) northeast of Plzeň. It lies in the Rakovník Uplands, on the border of the Křivoklátsko Protected Landscape Area. The highest point is at 397 m (1,302 ft) above sea level. The stream Rakovnický potok flows through the town.

== History ==
The first written mention of Rakovník is from 1252. Křivoklát was the administrative centre at this time. Rakovník was a market village which together with other villages lies in and adds to the surroundings of Křivoklát Castle.

In the second half of the 16th century, the town was rapidly developing. Town walls with town gates were built, the Church of Holy Trinity with a cemetery was established, and the beer brewing prospered and became known in whole kingdom. In the 17th century, the town suffered from Thirty Years' War, plague and floods, which depopulated the town.

A great development of the town was fulfilled in the 19th century. It was the beginning of independent offices, new houses and a time when new streets were built. Some new roads were built and old roads repaired and Rakovník was connected to the surrounding towns. A grammar school was opened in 1833, where the writer Zikmund Winter used to teach in 1874–1884.

Until 1918, the town was part of Austria-Hungary. With the 20th century the development of social and cultural life increased dramatically. Masaryk's Business Academy, gymnasium and hospital were also built. During the two world wars there were no actual fighting in Rakovník itself but a lot of people died in concentration camps. The most affected were Jewish families. In 1950, Rakovník became a district town. A lot of people moved to the town when Rakovník got over the crises of the wars.

== Demographics ==
Historical population

| Year | Pop. | ±% |
|---|---|---|
| 1869 | 4,274 | — |
| 1880 | 5,245 | +22.7% |
| 1890 | 5,629 | +7.3% |
| 1900 | 6,622 | +17.6% |
| 1910 | 8,394 | +26.8% |

| Year | Pop. | ±% |
|---|---|---|
| 1921 | 8,805 | +4.9% |
| 1930 | 11,078 | +25.8% |
| 1950 | 11,619 | +4.9% |
| 1961 | 11,956 | +2.9% |
| 1970 | 13,103 | +9.6% |

| Year | Pop. | ±% |
|---|---|---|
| 1980 | 16,233 | +23.9% |
| 1991 | 17,425 | +7.3% |
| 2001 | 16,695 | −4.2% |
| 2011 | 16,585 | −0.7% |
| 2021 | 15,373 | −7.3% |

Source: Censuses

== Economy ==
The Rakovník Brewery was founded in 1454. It is one of the oldest breweries in the country. The beers are marketed under the brand Bakalář.

In 1875, Otta's soap factory was opened. It was later called Rakona and is today owned by Procter & Gamble.

In 1883, a ceramic factory was established, known as Rakovnické keramické závody ('Rakovník ceramic plants'). Today the brand is owned by Lasselsberger and it is the biggest producer of sanitary ware in the country.

The area near Rakovník was known for shale mining. Mining started in 1919 and ceased in 2018. The reason for the cessation of mining was primarily the obsolescence of technologies that did not meet legislative requirements, which made further mining unprofitable. However, an estimated 12 million tonnes of shale remained underground.

== Transport ==
Rakovník is the terminus and start of railway lines heading from Prague, Kladno, Beroun, Osek, Žlutice, Bečov nad Teplou and Blatno.

== Sights ==
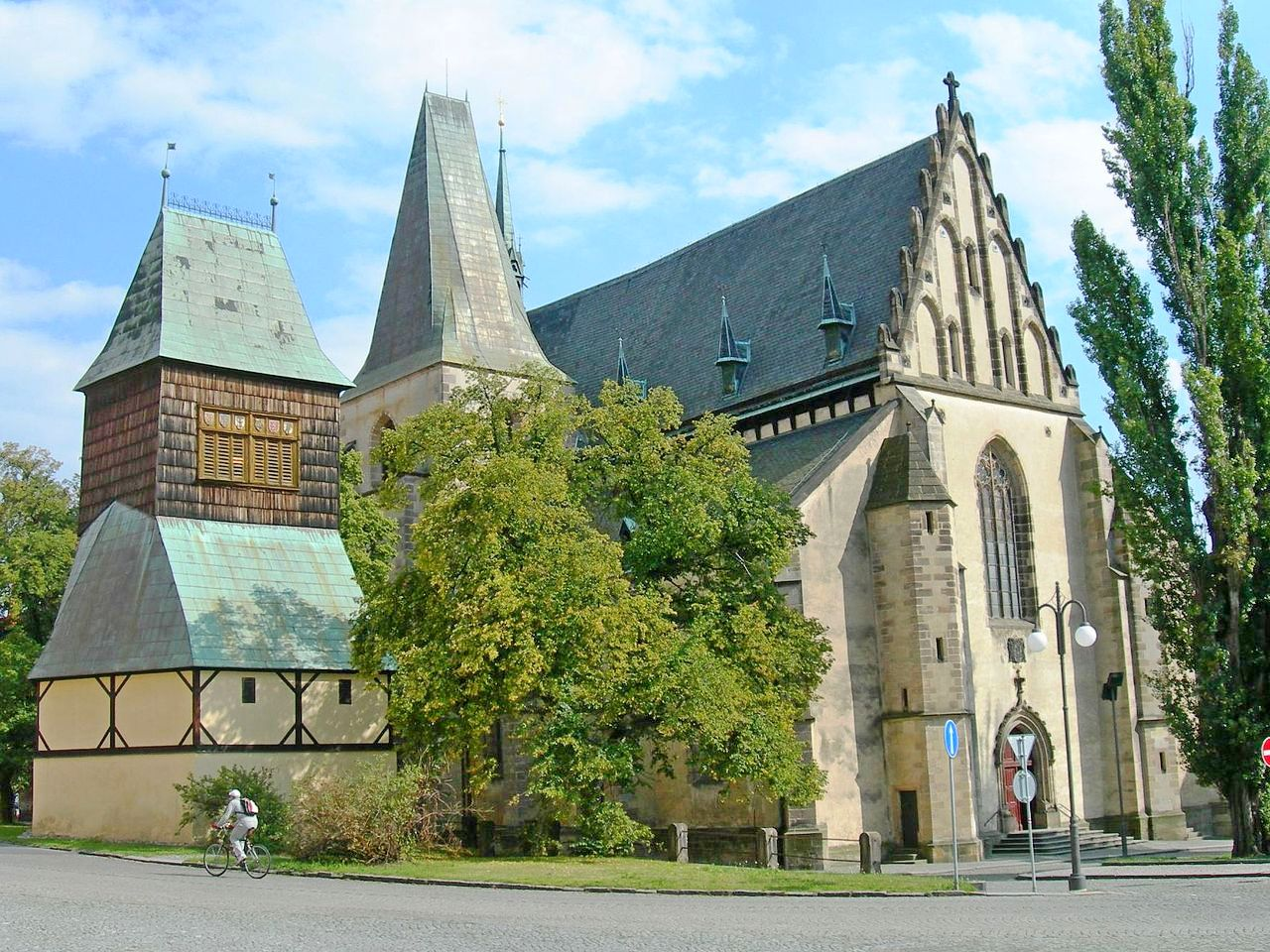
Church of Saint Bartholomew

The historical core of the town is the 400 metre-long square Husovo náměstí, which is the second longest square in the Czech Republic. On the square is located the 16th-century town hall with a late Baroque façade. The interior of the town hall is decorated with a ceiling fresco depicting the town of Rakovník as it was 250 years ago.

The eastern part of the square is dominated by the Church of Saint Bartholomew, a 14th-century high Gothic structure. The church was built on the site of an older church dedicated to Saint Nicholas. Adjacent to the church stands a bell tower dating from 1495. It is considered the most precious Gothic bell tower in the Czech Republic and one of the most precious in Europe. The bell has a diameter of 1.6 metres.

Other notable buildings in Rakovník include the Church of Holy Trinity from the end of the 16th century and the Gothic Church of Saint Giles.

The former synagogue serves for cultural and social purposes. It contains the Václav Rabas Art Gallery, named after the painter Václav Rabas that was born in the Rakovník region.

== Notable people ==
- Karel Burian (1870–1924), operatic tenor
- Emil Burian (1876–1926), operatic baritone
- Miloslav Ransdorf (1953–2016), politician
- Josef Kott (born 1957), spree killer
- Pavel Steidl (born 1961), guitarist
- Jan Bidrman (born 1966), swimmer and swimming coach
- Kateřina Jalovcová (born 1978), operatic mezzo-soprano
- Tomáš Kaberle (born 1978), ice hockey player
- Jana Pechanová (born 1981), swimmer
- Petr Tatíček (born 1983), ice hockey player
- Veronika Khek Kubařová (born 1987), actress

== Twin towns – sister cities ==
Rakovník is twinned with:

- Dietzenbach, Germany
- Kościan, Poland
- Kráľovský Chlmec, Slovakia
