= Burian =

Burian (feminine: Burianová) is a Czech surname. It originated from the nickname of Saint John, búrný (an adjective derived from the Czech word bouřka, i.e. 'storm'), because in the Czech lands he was considered a protector during storms. Notable people with the surname include:

- Batilda Salha Burian (born 1965), Tanzanian diplomat
- Emil Burian (1876–1926), Czech singer
- Emil František Burian (1904–1959), Czech writer
- Ewald Burian (1896–1981), German soldier
- Gottlieb Burian (1837–1902), Silesian-American settler
- Jan Burian (born 1952), Czech musician and television presenter
- Jitka Burianová (born 1977), Czech athlete
- Jozef Burian (1961–2021), Slovak politician
- Karel Burian (1870–1924), Czech singer
- Karl Burian (died 1944), Austrian captain, activist and Nazi resistance leader
- Kateřina Burianová (born 1946), Czech actress
- Michal Burian (born 1992), Australian Paralympic javelin thrower
- Natasha Burian, Seychellois judge
- Peter Burian (born 1959), Slovak diplomat
- Rosemarie Burian (1936–2019), American Franciscan sister
- Vilém Burian (born 1988), Czech ice hockey player
- Vlasta Burian (1891–1962), Czech actor and singer
- Zdeněk Burian (1905–1981), Czech artist

== See also ==
- 7867 Burian, main-belt asteroid
- Katalin Burián (born 1995), Hungarian swimmer
- Leonardo Burián (born 1984), Uruguayan footballer
- Stephan Burián von Rajecz (1851–1922), Austro-Hungarian politician
- Burján, Hungarian surname
- Buriana, Irish saint
