= Burjan =

Burjan may refer to:

- Burjan (Mirpur), a village in Pakistan
- Burjan, Požarevac, a settlement in Serbia
- Hildegard Burjan (1883–1933), Austrian politician
- Burján, Hungarian surname

== See also ==
- Burian, Czech surname
