= Karel Burian =

Czech operatic tenor

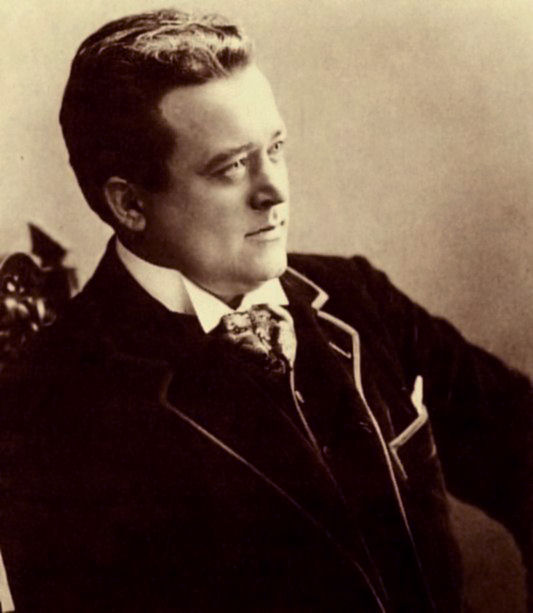
Karel Burian

Karel Burian (also Carl Burrian) (12 January 1870 – 25 September 1924) was a Czech operatic tenor who had an active international career spanning the 1890s to the 1920s. A Heldentenor, Burian earned acclaim in Europe and America for his powerful performances of the heaviest Wagnerian roles. His voice is preserved on numerous recordings made for Pathé Records, the Gramophone Company, the Gramophone & Typewriter Company (and its successor HMV) and the Victor Recording Company.

== Biography ==
Born in Rousínov (now part of Slabce) near Rakovník, Burian was the older brother of operatic baritone Emil Burian and the uncle of composer Emil František Burian. Both brothers studied singing under František Pivoda in Prague. Inititially Burian had intended to become a lawyer and had attended Prague University for a year in pursuit of this goal. However, a professor at the university heard his voice and encouraged him to pursue an operatic career, putting him in touch with Pivoda for lessons. He later pursued further vocal studies with Felix von Kraus in Munich.

Burian made his professional opera debut as Jeník in Bedřich Smetana’s The Bartered Bride at the opera house in Brno on 28 March 1891. The very next day, he portrayed the title role in Smetana's Dalibor to such outstanding success that he was offered a long-term contract with the Brno Opera. However, he sang only one other major role with the company, Manrico in Giuseppe Verdi's Il trovatore, before joining the opera house in Reval for the 1892/1893 season. He sang at the opera house in Aachen during the 1893/1894 season, notably appearing in the world premiere of Leo Blech's first opera, Aglaja.

By the mid-1890s, Burian was beginning to build a substantial reputation in Germany for the quality of his performances of the heldentenor repertoire. From 1894 to 1896, he was the leading Wagnerian tenor at the Cologne Opera. While there, he sang (among other things) in the world premieres of Karl von Kaskel's Sjula (1895) and Arnold Mendelssohn's Elsi, die seltsame Magd (1896). He left Cologne to take up a commitment to sing at the Staatsoper Hannover in 1896 to 1898, followed by a three-year term at the Hamburg State Opera from 1898 to 1901. He was also active at the Berlin State Opera during the 1898/99 season.

By 1899, Burian had been engaged to appear at the best opera house of his home nation, the National Theatre in Prague. However, he did not remain for long with that theatre, as he was now a much-in-demand singer in Germany, where he could earn higher fees and greater prestige. For more than a decade prior to World War I, Burian was a leading and much-admired tenor at the Semperoper in Dresden, where he made a powerful impression as Herod in the world première of Richard Strauss’s Salome in 1905. He later repeated the role for the first productions of Salome in New York City and Paris (in 1907).

The operas of Richard Wagner were Burian's major focus on the international stage. He notably sang Tristan in the Hungarian première of Tristan und Isolde, and also appeared as several of the principal Wagner heroes at the Royal Opera House, Covent Garden, London, during four seasons between 1904 and 1914. He also sang almost all of the major Wagner roles at the Metropolitan Opera, where he performed for seven seasons. In 1908, he made his only appearance at the Bayreuth Festival in the title role of Parsifal. Burian published his memoirs, Z mých pamětí, in 1913. Among other things, they contain his recollections of the composer/conductor Gustav Mahler and the conductor Arturo Toscanini.

In 1907, Burian moved to Senomaty where he bought a homestead. Today the town square in Senomaty is named after him. In 1920, Burian mistakenly drank bleach, believing it to be mineral water, and suffered severe burns to his mouth and larynx. The wounds eventually healed, but his voice never fully recovered. His last two performances at the National Theatre in Prague were in 1922, when he sang in Dalibor and Tannhäuser. Two years later, he died in Senomaty after a brief illness. He was 54. His death was marked by a black flag draped on the National Theatre. The Czech Philharmonic played Siegfried's funeral march from Götterdämmerung.

He was known for his powerful stage presence, and according to the music critic Desmond Shawe-Taylor, his voice was praised for its "golden quality" and the "penetrating clarity" of its tone. The latter quality is apparent in his early recordings despite their primitive technology.
