= Klouček =

Klouček is a surname of Czech origin. Notable people with this surname include:

- Celda Klouček (Celestýn Klouček) (1855–1935), Czech schulptor and palaeontologist
- Josef Klouček (1905–1987), Czech skier, competitor in the 1928 Winter Olympics (military patrol)
- Tomáš Klouček (1980–2025), Czech ice hockey player

== See also ==
- Frank Kloucek (born 1956), Democrat politician from South Dakota, US
