= Slabce =

- Market town
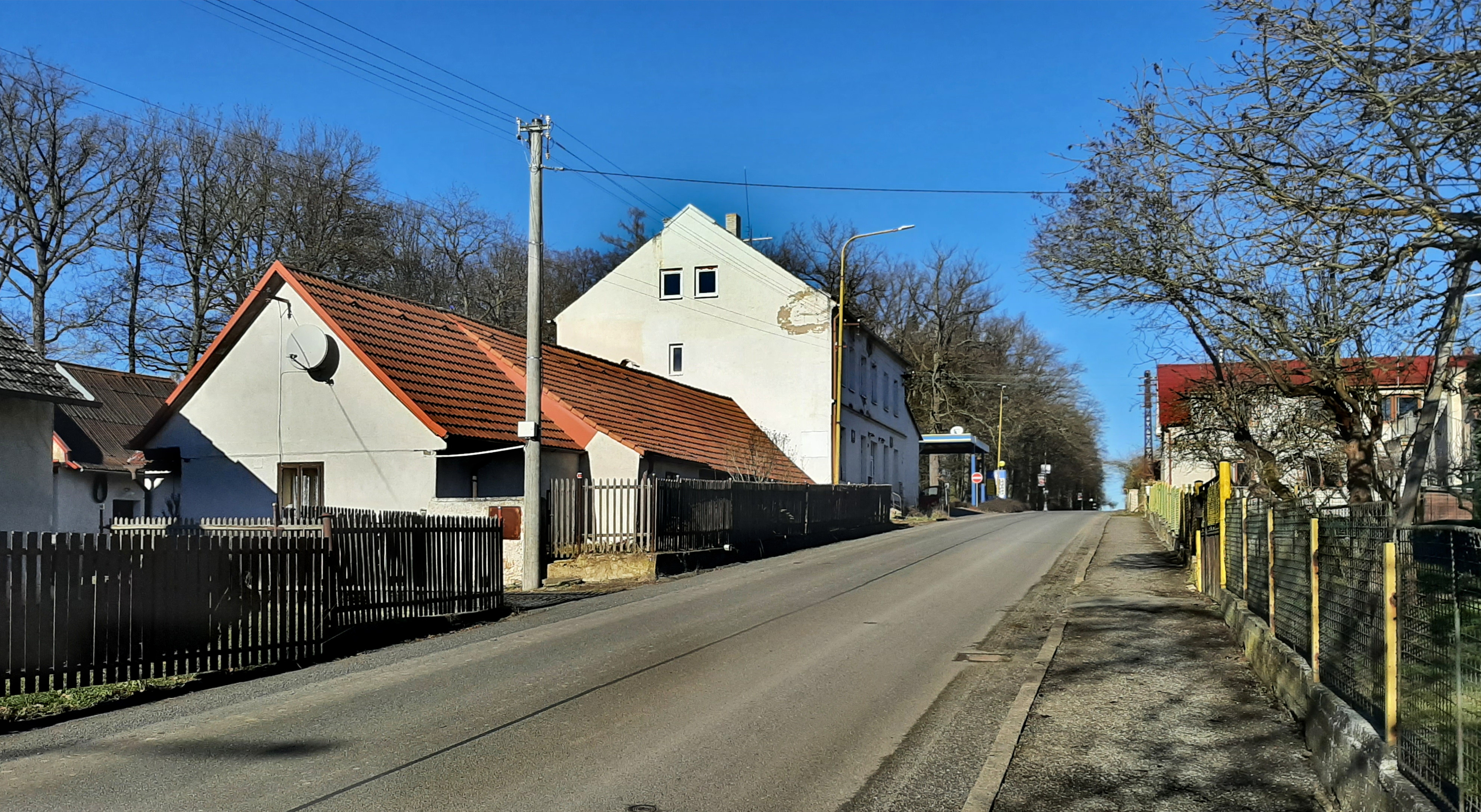
- Main street

- Flag Coat of arms

- Location in the Czech Republic
- Coordinates: 50°0′0″N 13°42′53″E
- Country: Czech Republic
- Region: Central Bohemian
- District: Rakovník
- First mentioned: 1352

Area
  - Total: 27.64 km^{2} (10.67 sq mi)
- Elevation: 419 m (1,375 ft)

Population (2026-01-01)
  - Total: 734
  - Density: 26.6/km^{2} (68.8/sq mi)
- Time zone: UTC+1 (CET)
  - Summer (DST): UTC+2 (CEST)
- Postal code: 270 41
- Website: www.slabce.cz

Slabce (Czech pronunciation: [ˈslaptsɛ]) is a market town in Rakovník District in the Central Bohemian Region of the Czech Republic. It has about 700 inhabitants.

== Administrative division ==
Slabce consists of eight municipal parts (in brackets population according to the 2021 census):

- Slabce (338)
- Kostelík (33)
- Malé Slabce (11)
- Modřejovice (96)
- Nová Ves (14)
- Rousínov (106)
- Skupá (38)
- Svinařov (39)

== Etymology ==
The name is derived from the old Czech word slabec (i.e. 'weakling'), meaning "the village of weaklings".

== Geography ==
Slabce is located about 5 kilometres (3 mi) south of Rakovník and 43 km (27 mi) west of Prague. It lies in the Plasy Uplands. The highest point is the hill Hůrka at 492 m (1,614 ft) above sea level. The Berounka River flows along the southern municipal border. Almost the entire municipal territory lies in the Křivoklátsko Protected Landscape Area.

== History ==
The first written mention of Slabce is from 1352.

== Demographics ==
Historical population

Year	Pop.	±%
1869	2,406	—
1880	2,120	−11.9%
1890	2,079	−1.9%
1900	1,879	−9.6%
1910	1,913	+1.8%

Year	Pop.	±%
1921	1,840	−3.8%
1930	1,731	−5.9%
1950	1,325	−23.5%
1961	1,186	−10.5%
1970	953	−19.6%

Year	Pop.	±%
1980	796	−16.5%
1991	699	−12.2%
2001	701	+0.3%
2011	709	+1.1%
2021	675	−4.8%

Source: Censuses

== Transport ==
There are no railways or major roads passing through the municipality.

== Sights ==
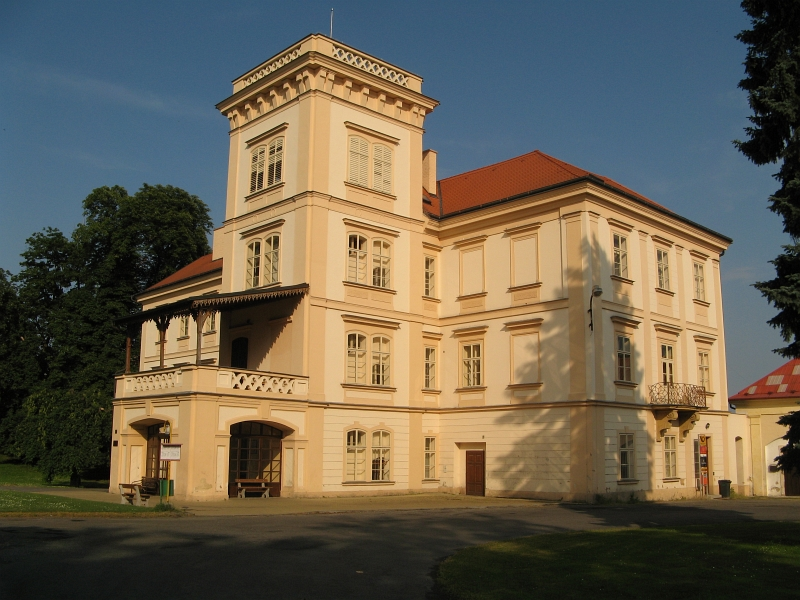
Slabce Castle

The main landmarks of Slabce are the church and the castle. The Church of Saint Nicholas was originally a Romanesque building, probably from the beginning of the 12h century. At the end of the 18th century, it was rebuilt in the Baroque style.

The Slabce Castle is a valuable complex of a Baroque manor house. It was founded at the beginning of the 18th century and gradually rebuilt in the 18th and 19th centuries. A part of the castle complex is a landscape park with an area of 13 ha (32 acres).

The Church of the Nativity of the Virgin Mary is located in Rousínov. It was built in the Gothic style in the 14th century. In the mid-18th century, it was rebuilt into its present form.

== Notable people ==
- Karel Burian (1870–1924), operatic tenor
