= Jiří Dědeček =

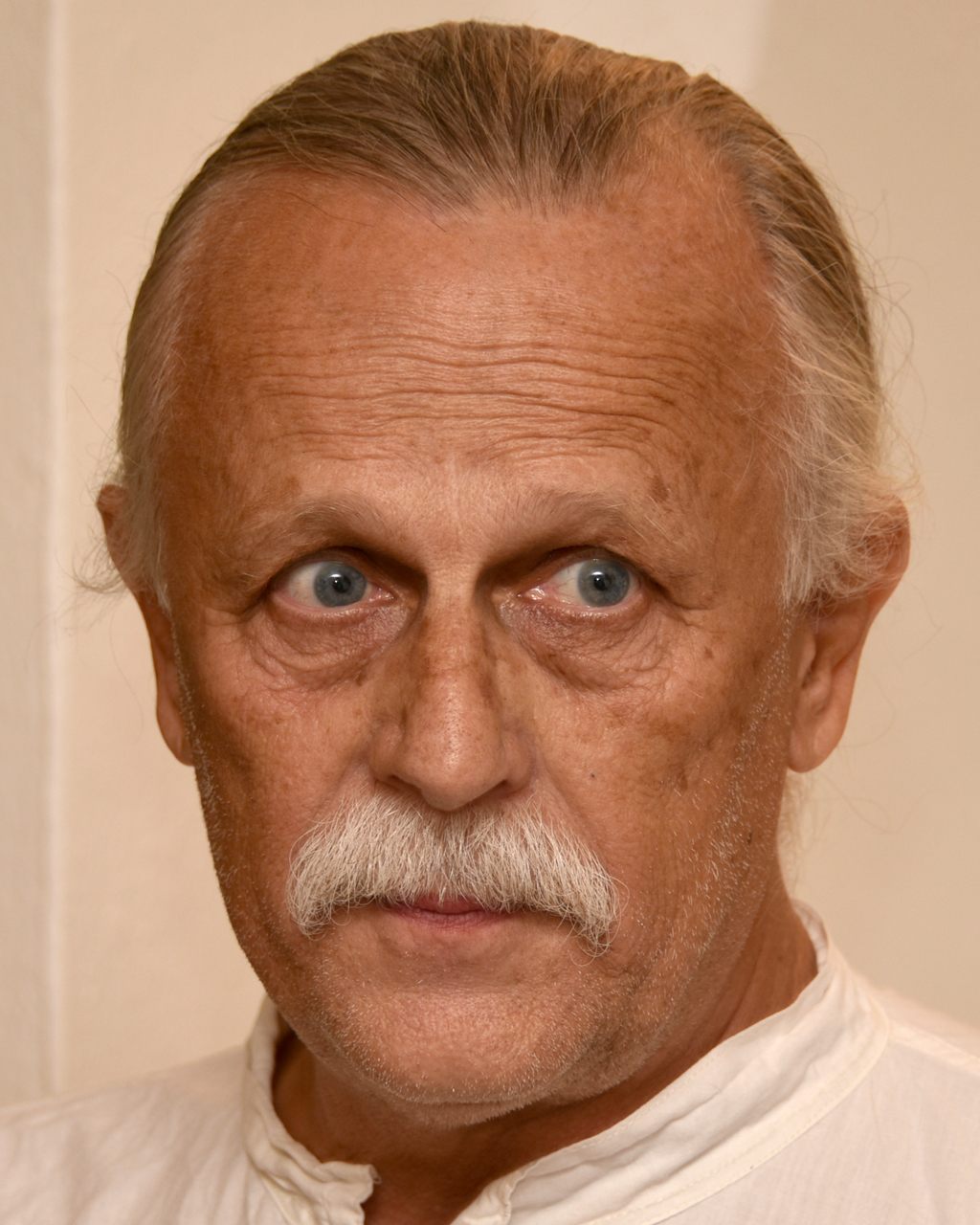
Jiří Dědeček (2019)

Jiří Dědeček (born 13 February 1953 Karlovy Vary) is a Czech musician, songwriter, poet, translator, writer and author of numerous radio and television programs.

He performed in tandem with Jan Burian In the years 1973–1985.

Dědeček is a president of the Czech PEN Centre.

== Education ==
He graduated in librarianship from Charles University in Prague in 1976. In 1983 to 1987 He studied script writing in Film and TV School of the Academy of Performing Arts in Prague.

== Discography (selection) ==
- 1990 – Zabili trafikantku
- 1996 – Kouzlo noční samoty
- 1998 – Žalozpěv pro lehký holky
- 2003 – Kdyby smrtka měla mladý
- 2006 – Řekněte to mýmu psovi
