= Burján =

Burján is a Hungarian surname. Notable people with the surname include:

- Csaba Burján (born 1994), Hungarian speed skater
- László Burján (born 1985), Hungarian judoka

== See also ==
- Burjan (disambiguation)
- Burian, Czech surname
