= Karl Burian =

Austrian captain (1896–1944)

- Died: 13 March 1944; Vienna, Nazi Germany
- Cause of death: Execution
- Known for: Military strategizing, monarchist activism, and Nazi resistance

Hauptmann Karl Burian (died 13 March 1944) was an Austrian captain for Austria-Hungary during World War I, activist for the restoration of the Austrian monarchy, and an important figure of the Austrian resistance against Nazi Germany. After Germany's Anschluss, or annexation of Austria, in March 1938, Burian created a resistance group, the Legitimist Central Committee, which planned to blow up the Gestapo headquarters in Vienna, the Hotel Metropole. Later that year, he attempted to give German mobilization plans to a contact who was secretly a Gestapo spy. He was sentenced to five years in prison, and executed in Vienna in 1944.

== World War I and monarchist activism ==
Hauptmann Karl Burian was an Austrian captain for Austria-Hungary during World War I, and a legitimist. "Legitimists" in this context were those who wanted the reinstatement of pre-World War I European monarchies, such as Austria-Hungary, which dissolved in 1918 at the war's end. After the war, Burian created the monarchist combat organization Ostara, and was later in the Legitimist academic fraternity Corps de Ottonen. In the late 1930s, legitimists rallied around Otto von Hapsburg—the son of the late Austro-Hungarian emperor Charles I—who had been in exile in Steenokkerzeel, Belgium. Legitimists' attachment to Austria-Hungary, historian Radomír Luža writes, "became more insistent as [German Nazist ideology] displayed more disregard for the separate Austria [cultural] identity."

== Austrian resistance ==
On 12 March 1938, Nazi Germany annexed Austria in the Anschluss, and Otto von Hapsburg pleaded for armed resistance in a Paris speech on 15 March. The Corps de Ottonen was dissolved that month, and three days later, fifty of its members went underground. The group's senior president, Willi Klein, emigrated to Paris, and Burian took his place. Burian created the Legitimist Central Committee. Leading Committee members were Josef Wotypka, Burian's deputy; Rochus Kozak, in charge of "organizational affairs"; Julius Kretschmer, in charge of propaganda; Ludwig Krausz-Wienner, in charge of "ideological problems"; and Josef Krinninger, their courier. The Committee communicated with the Hebra and Zemljak legitimist groups, and was supplied with funds from abroad. They communicated with Hapsburg through the former Greek Consul in Vienna, Michael Georg Koimzoglu, and other associates of Krinninger's in Switzerland and Czechoslovakia.

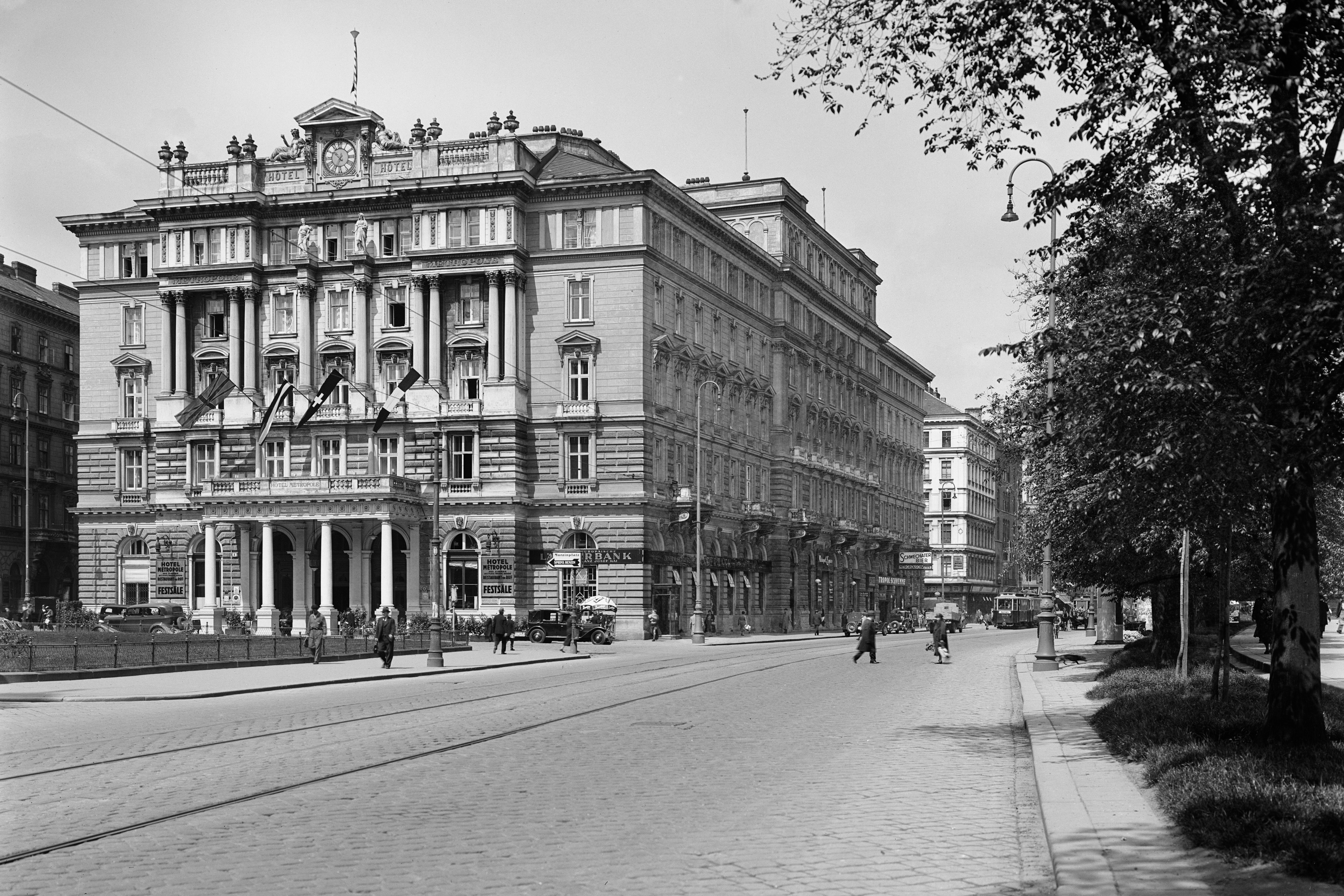
The Hotel Metropole in the 1930s

In May, the assets of Hotel Metropole in Vienna were seized by the Gestapo, who made it their headquarters. Burian's resistance group planned to blow the hotel up. One of the hotel's expropriated co-proprietors and a legitimist, Karl Freidiger, came to the group with the hotel's floor plans. The bombing plan, and Burian's direct contact with Hapsburg, made Burian a "particularly dangerous" threat to the Gestapo.

A former member of Corps de Ottonen, Dr. Othmar Slavik, who was then living in Solothurn, Switzerland, arranged a meeting for 27 August between Burian and a supposed Polish intelligence agent, to whom Burian would supply German mobilization plans. The man was actually Gestapo spy Josef Materna, who was also an Abwehr informant in their Vienna office. The Gestapo and Abwehr Vienna office had been exchanging information. Burian was arrested on 13 October 1938, while leaving the coffeehouse where Materna had given him military documents. Other members of the group were arrested later that month. He was interned for five years on charges of espionage, sentenced to death on 9 December 1943, and executed in Vienna on 13 March 1944.

== Sources ==
- Elisabeth Boeckl-Klamper, Thomas Mang, Wolfgang Neugebauer (2022). The Vienna Gestapo, 1938-1945: Crimes, Perpetrators, Victims, Berghahn Books. ISBN 9781800732605
- Luža, Radomír (1984). The Resistance in Austria 1938-1945, U of Minnesota Press. ISBN 9781452912660
- John Horne, Robert Gerwarth (2013). War in Peace: Paramilitary Violence in Europe After the Great War, OUP Oxford. ISBN 9780199686056
- Kamil Ruszała, Tomasz Pudłocki (2021). Postwar Continuity and New Challenges in Central Europe, 1918–1923, Taylor & Francis. ISBN 9781000455724
