= Senomaty =

- Market town
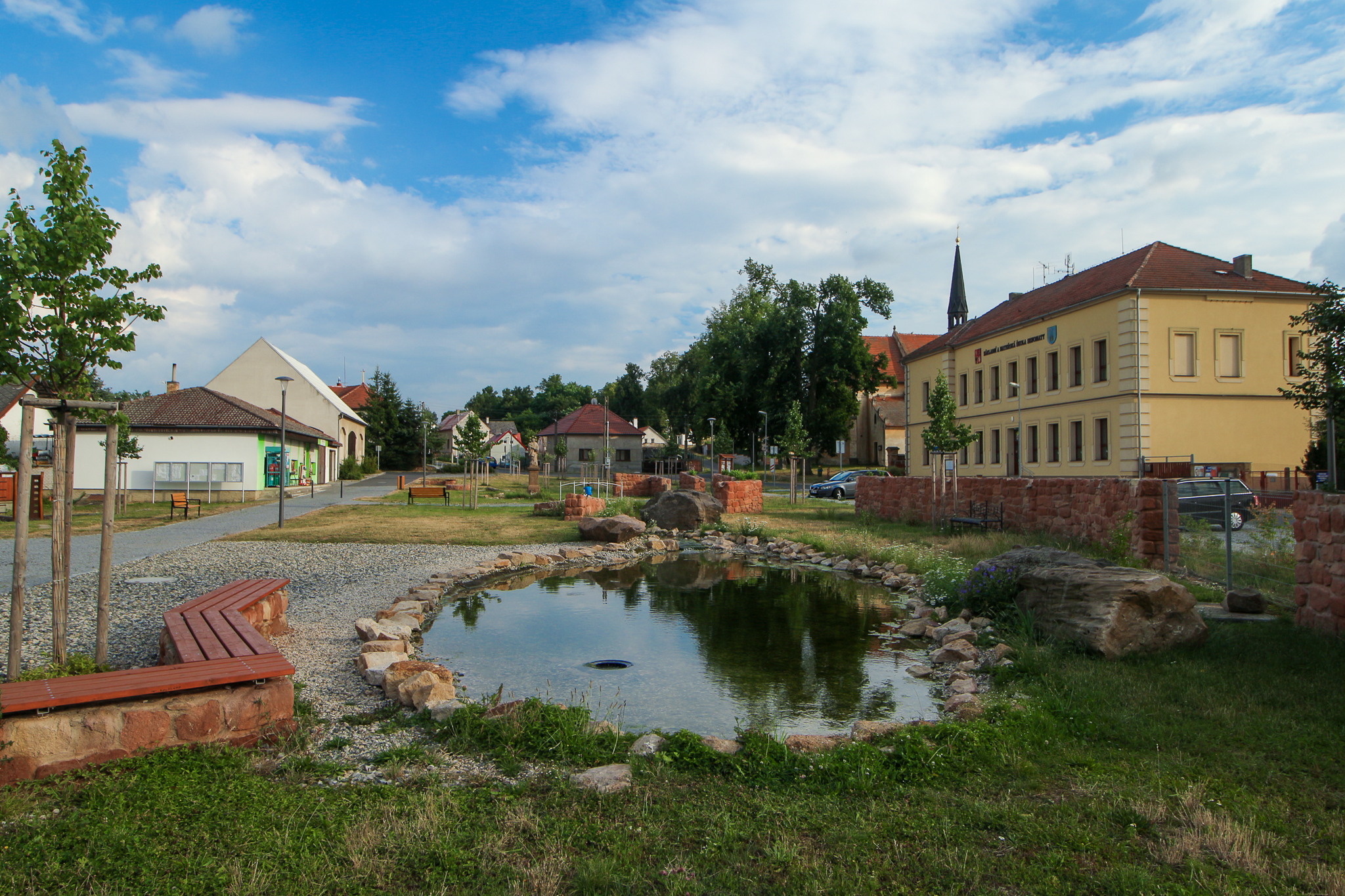
- Centre of Senomaty

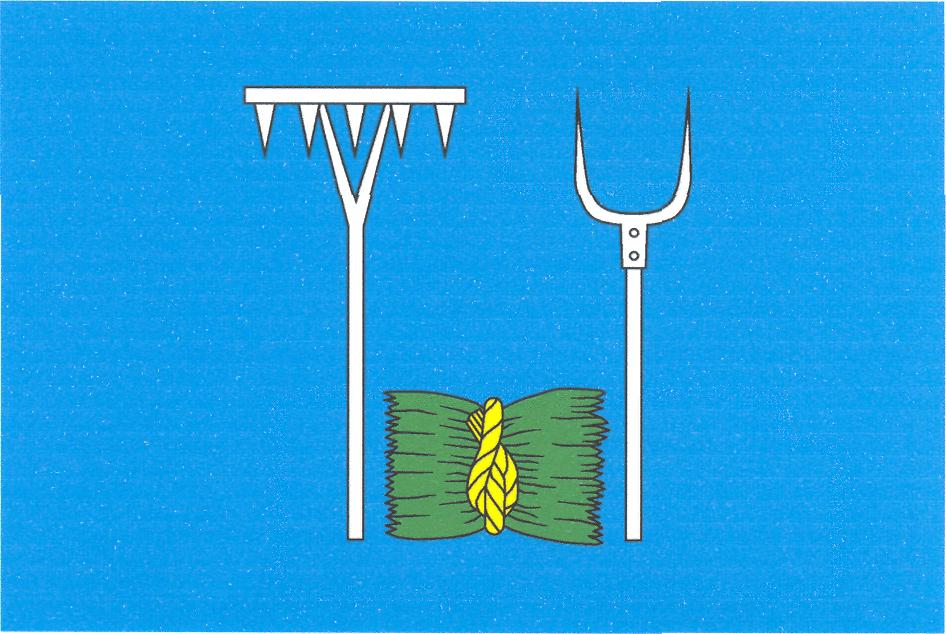
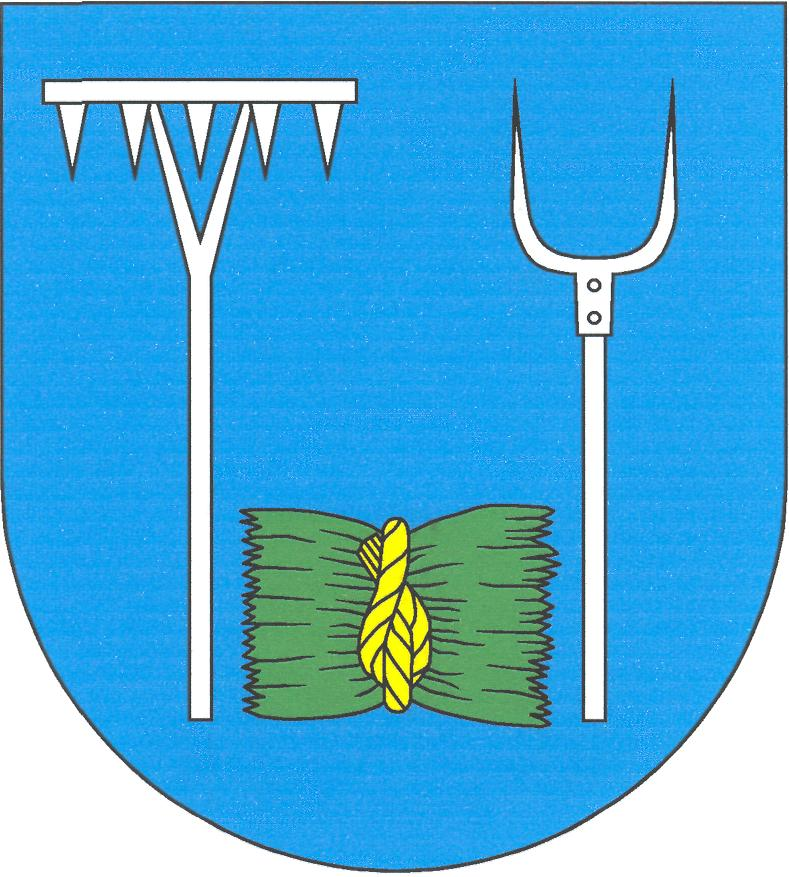
- Flag Coat of arms

- Location in the Czech Republic
- Coordinates: 50°5′54″N 13°39′14″E
- Country: Czech Republic
- Region: Central Bohemian
- District: Rakovník
- First mentioned: 1233

Area
  - Total: 14.10 km^{2} (5.44 sq mi)
- Elevation: 336 m (1,102 ft)

Population (2026-01-01)
  - Total: 1,307
  - Density: 92.70/km^{2} (240.1/sq mi)
- Time zone: UTC+1 (CET)
  - Summer (DST): UTC+2 (CEST)
- Postal code: 270 31
- Website: www.senomaty.cz

Senomaty (Czech pronunciation: [ˈsɛnomatɪ]) is a market town in Rakovník District in the Central Bohemian Region of the Czech Republic. It has about 1,300 inhabitants.

== Administrative division ==
Senomaty consists of three municipal parts (in brackets population according to the 2021 census):

- Senomaty (957)
- Hostokryje (123)
- Nouzov (142)

== Etymology ==
The name is derived from the Czech words seno ('hay') and mísiti ('mix'), so the name means "the village of people who mix hay". It was a derisive nickname the village received from residents of neighbouring villages.

== Geography ==
Senomaty is located about 5 kilometres (3 mi) west of Rakovník and 47 km (29 mi) west of Prague. It lies in the Rakovník Uplands. The highest point is at 419 m (1,375 ft) above sea level. The stream Rakovnický potok flows through the market town.

== History ==
The first written mention of Senomaty is in a donation deed of King Wenceslaus I of Bohemia from 1233. During the rule of King John of Bohemia, in 1315, Senomaty was promoted to a market town.

In 1589, Emperor Rudolf II sold Senomaty to Václav Hochhauzer of Pšovce. During his rule the inhabitants were oppressed. In 1592, the market town was destroyed by fire and many residents preferred to move away. The Hochhauzer family owned Senomaty until 1613, when they sold it to the town of Rakovník. With a short break in 1624, Senomaty was property of Rakovník until the establishment of an independent municipality in 1850, and shared its owners and history.

== Demographics ==
Historical population

Year	Pop.	±%
1869	1,613	—
1880	1,690	+4.8%
1890	1,519	−10.1%
1900	1,580	+4.0%
1910	1,617	+2.3%

Year	Pop.	±%
1921	1,554	−3.9%
1930	1,661	+6.9%
1950	1,270	−23.5%
1961	1,240	−2.4%
1970	1,105	−10.9%

Year	Pop.	±%
1980	940	−14.9%
1991	851	−9.5%
2001	897	+5.4%
2011	1,083	+20.7%
2021	1,222	+12.8%

Source: Censuses

== Transport ==
Senomaty is located on the railway line Rakovník–Bečov nad Teplou.

== Sights ==
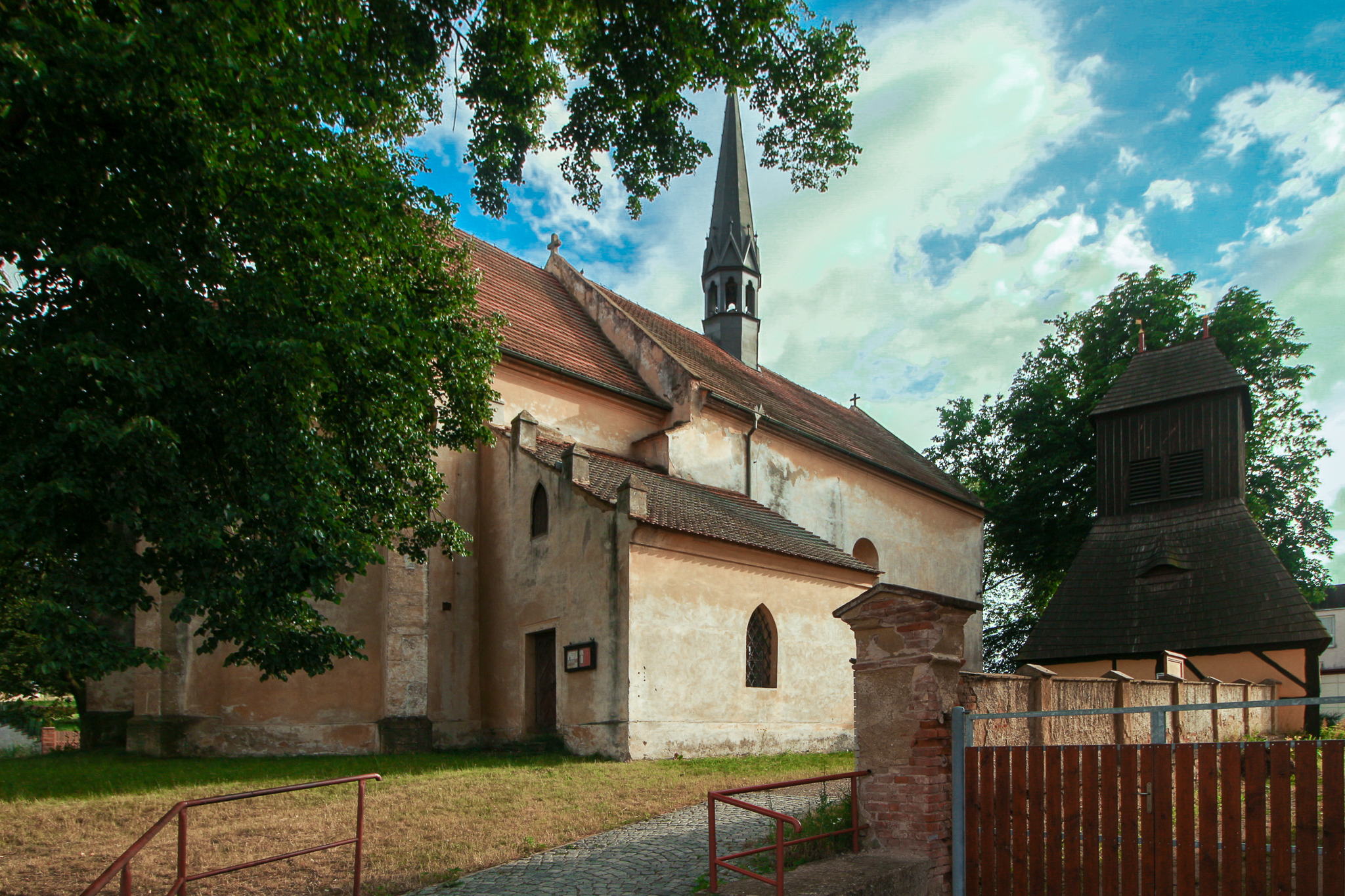
Church of Saint Lawrence

The main landmark of Senomaty is the Church of Saint Lawrence. The church has a late Romanesque nave, which was expanded in the Gothic style in the 14th century. Later it was modified in the Baroque style. Next to the church is a separate half-timbered Renaissance belfry.

The Church of Saint Stephan is a small cemetery church on the edge of the market town. It was built in the Baroque style in the 18th century.

== Notable people ==
- Celda Klouček (1855–1935), sculptor and designer
- Karel Burian (1870–1924), operatic tenor; lived and died here
