= Emil Burian =

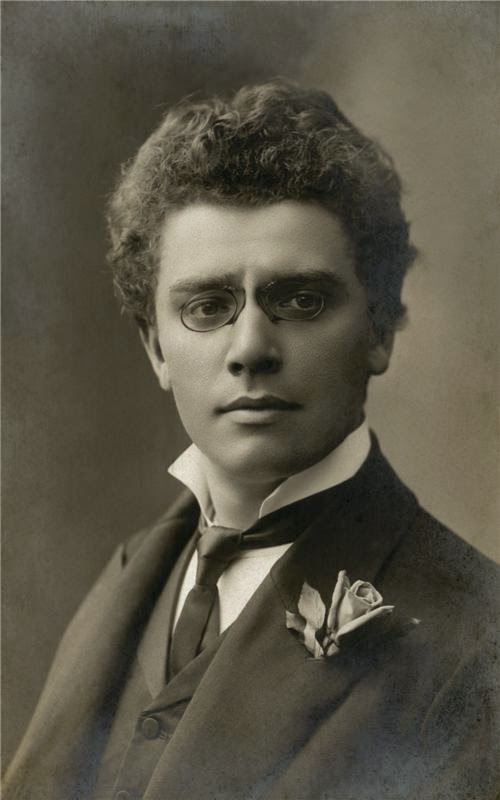
Emil Burian, ca 1910

Emil Burian (12 December 1876 – 9 October 1926) was a Czech operatic baritone. He was the father of poet and composer Emil František Burian and the grandfather of Czech songwriter and poet Jan Burian.

Born in Rakovník, he was the younger brother of the famous Czech tenor Karel Burian, and, like his brother, was a pupil of singing teacher František Pivoda in Prague. Burian made his professional opera debut in 1895 at the Cologne Opera. He sang then at the National Moravian-Silesian Theatre in Ostrava and the National Theatre Brno. From 1899 until 1901 he performed at the Croatian National Theatre in Zagreb and from 1902 until 1904 he worked at the Divadlo Josefa Kajetána Tyla in Plzeň. From 1904 to 1906 he was on the roster of singers at the theatres of Nuremberg and Freiburg im Breisgau. He sang alongside his brother at the Semperoper in Dresden from 1906 until 1907, and then performed at the Hamburg State Opera from 1908 to 1910.

In 1910 Burian joined the roster of singers at the National Theatre in Prague. He was one of the most important singers at that house up until his death at the age of 49 in 1926 in Prague. He particularly excelled in the Czech repertoire, including Přemysl in Bedřich Smetana's Libuše, Tomeš in Smetana's The Kiss, Vladislav in Smetana's Dalibor, and the title role in Antonín Dvořák's The Jacobin. Other high points in his repertoire included Telramund in Richard Wagner's Lohengrin, Amfortas in Wagner's Parsifal, and Figaro in The Barber of Seville. He appeared as Krušina in a 1913 silent film version of The Bartered Bride.
