= Felix von Kraus =

Austrian opera singer

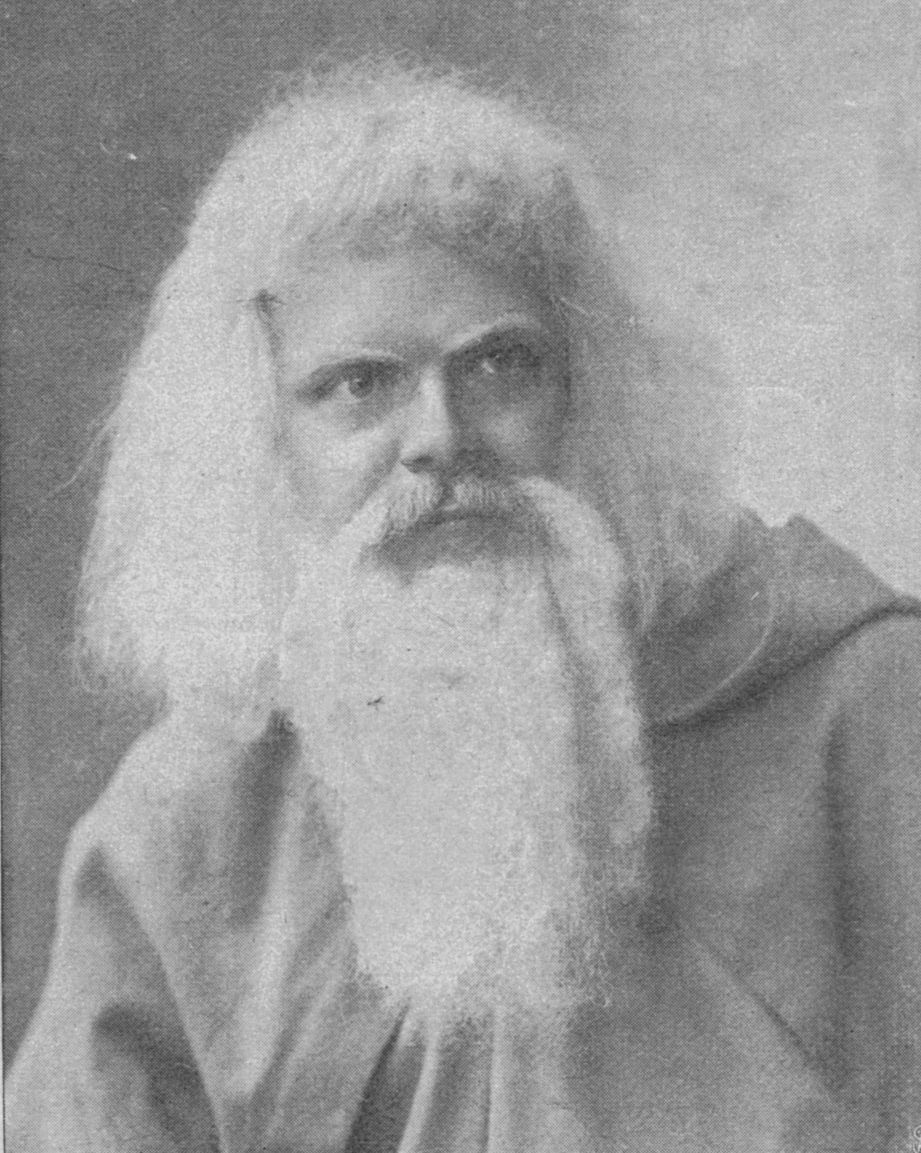

Felix von Kraus (October 3, 1870 - October 30, 1937) was an Austrian dramatic bass. Born in Vienna, he received a doctorate in musicology from the University of Vienna in 1894; as a singer, however, he was mainly self-taught. He made his debut at Bayreuth as Hagen in Götterdämmerung in 1899 and was heard thereafter at numerous Bayreuth Festivals and at other opera houses throughout Europe; he specialized in the works of Richard Wagner. In 1908 he became the artistic director of the Munich Opera; that same year he became a professor at the Munich Conservatory. Among his students was the Swiss tenor and early music specialist Max Meili and heldentenor Karel Burian. In 1899 Kraus married the American contralto Adrienne Osborne, also a Wagnerian. He had a child called Max Kraus. He retired from the stage in 1927 and died in Munich in 1937.

The name of his child was: Felizitas and not Max. He had a second daughter who died as a small child - her name was Maria or "Moidl". His grave is in the cemetery of Zell am Ziller in the Tyrol.
