= Hotel Metropole, Vienna =

Hotel in Vienna, Austria

Coordinates: 48°12′47″N 16°22′27″E

Hotel Metropole
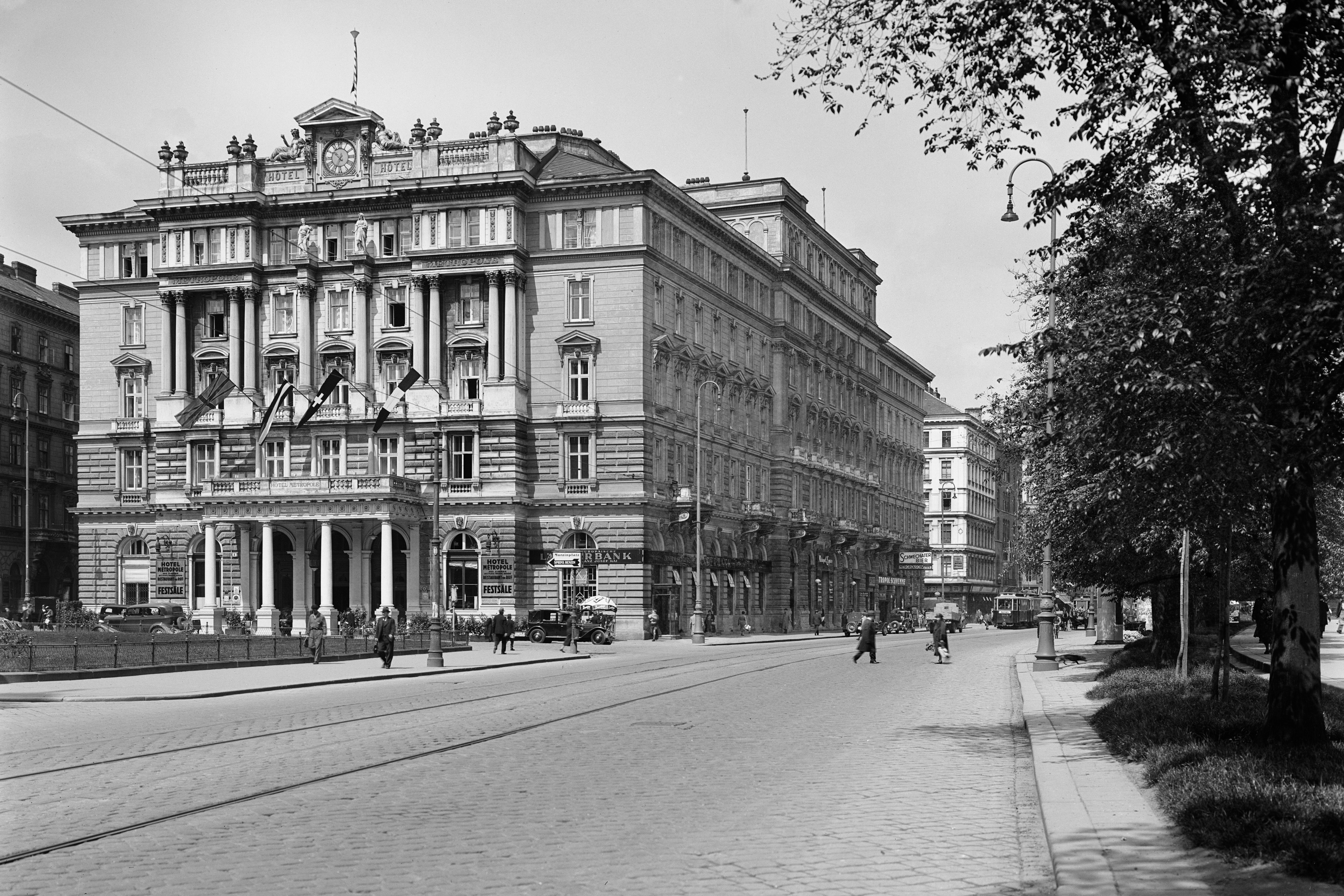
- Photograph of the hotel from the 1930s
- Interactive map of the Hotel Metropole area

General information
- Location: Morzinplatz 4, Vienna, Austria
- Opening: 1873
- Closed: 1938 (ceased to be hotel); 1945 (destroyed by bombing)

Technical details
- Floor count: 4

Design and construction
- Architects: Carl Schumann; Ludwig Tischler

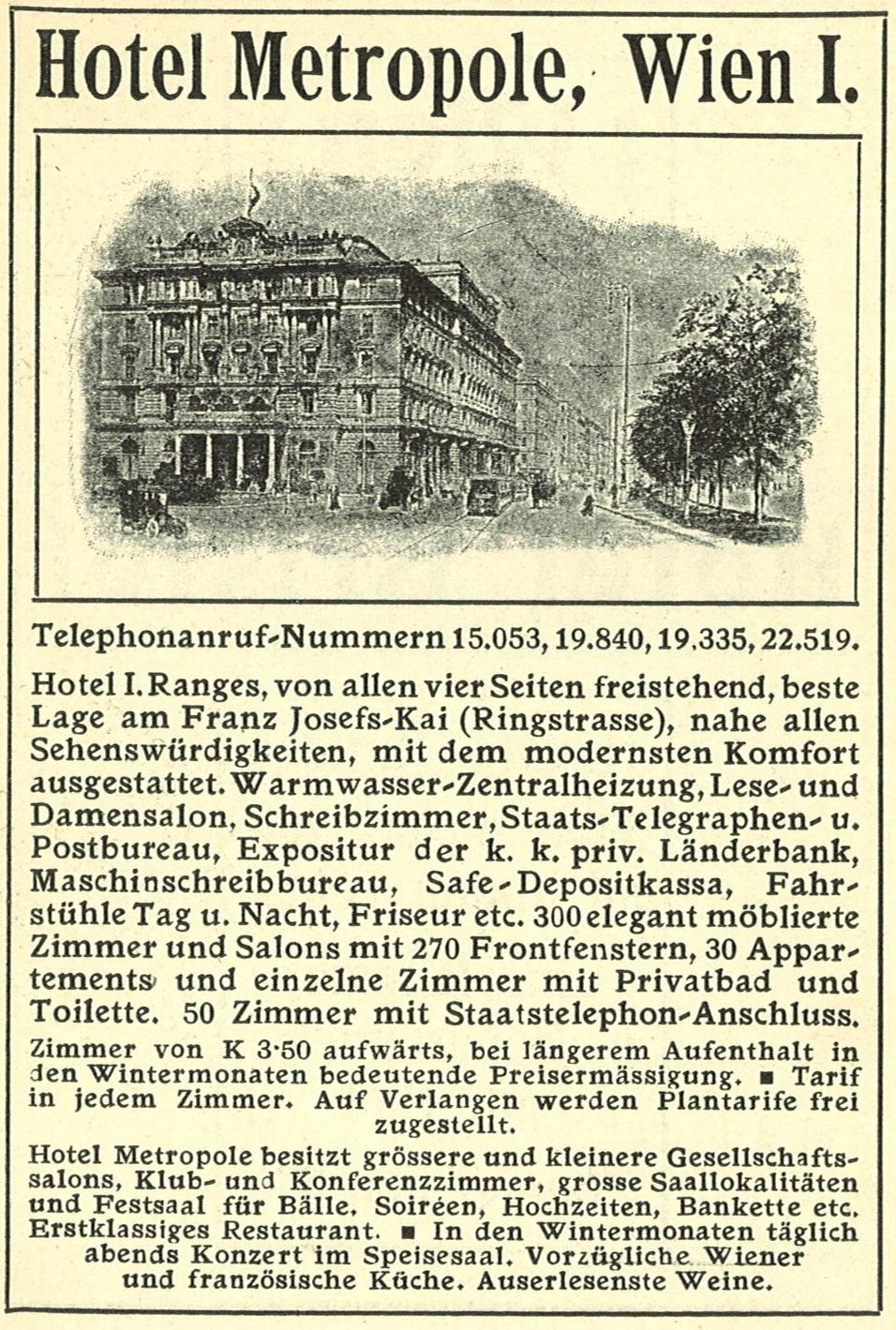
Advertisement of the hotel

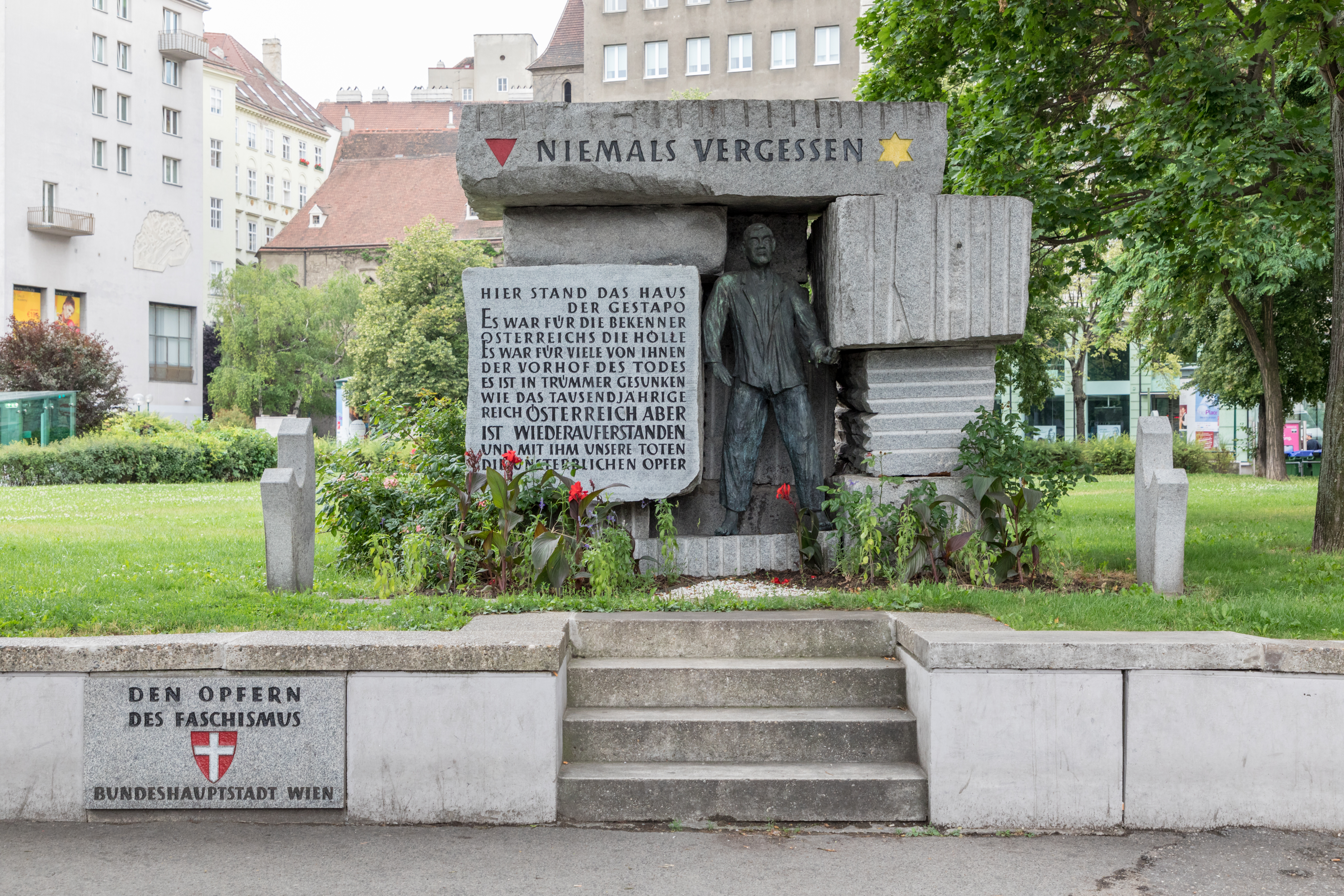
Monument on Morzinplatz to the victims of Nazi terror

Hotel Metropole was a hotel in Vienna, Austria that was constructed in 1871–73. It was destroyed during World War II after serving as the Vienna headquarters of the Gestapo from 1938. The address was Morzinplatz, in the 1st District Innere Stadt.

== History ==
The hotel was built for the Vienna World Exhibition and was designed by Carl Schumann and Ludwig Tischler. The four-story building was richly decorated with Corinthian columns, caryatids and atlases. The inner court was glassed over and had a richly decorated dining hall.

After the Anschluss of Austria to Nazi Germany in March 1938, the hotel was confiscated from its Jewish owners by the Gestapo who made it their headquarters. With a staff of 900 (80 per cent of whom were recruited from the Austrian police), it was the largest Gestapo office outside of Berlin. Many people, especially Jews, were interrogated or tortured there. At the end of the war, on March 12, 1945, the building was hit and burned during an Allied aerial bombardment of Vienna; ultimately, the ruins were demolished to eliminate any memory of the building.

In 1951 a memorial stone was erected by concentration camp survivors, which was then replaced in 1985 with a bigger monument financed by the city of Vienna. The monument consists of granite blocks from the quarry of the former concentration camp at Mauthausen and a bronze statue symbolising a survivor. The inscription comes from the president of the association of the survivors of the concentration camps Wilhelm Steiner and reads:

(German) "Hier stand das Haus der Gestapo. Es war für die Bekenner Österreichs die Hölle. Es war für viele von ihnen der Vorhof des Todes. Es ist in Trümmer gesunken wie das Tausendjährige Reich. Österreich aber ist wiederauferstanden und mit ihm unsere Toten, die unsterblichen Opfer."

(English) "Here stood the House of the Gestapo. To those who believed in Austria it was hell. To many it was the gates to death. It sank into ruins just like the 'Thousand Year Reich'. But Austria was resurrected and with her our dead, the immortal victims."

On 19 June 1995, the National Historical Commission of the Philippines, led by Amb. Reynaldo O. Arcilla, along with Rudolf Hundstorser, First Chairman of the Gemeinderat and Landtag of Vienna, unveiled at the former location of Hotel Metropole a historical marker of Philippine National Hero, José Rizal's visit to Vienna from 20 to 24 May 1887. Rizal has befriended Austro-Hungarian linguistic scholar Ferdinand Blumentritt of Leitmeritz.

On 13 June 2015, as part of the theatre festival Wiener Festwochen, a group of artists (Zsuzsi Flohr, Benjy Fox-Rosen, Eduard Freudmann, Eva Reinold, Luisa Ziaja) illegally erected a meta-memorial dedicated to the survivors who had illegally erected a monument on that spot in 1951. The inscription reads:

(German) "Was sie unterließ, haben wir getan. Den Errichter_innen eines nie errichteten Obelisken am 11. April 1951 um 19 Uhr 20."

(English) "What they neglected we did. To the erectors of a never erected obelisk on 11 April 1951, at 19:20"
