= Karl von Kaskel =

German composer (1866–1943)

- Born: October 10, 1866; Dresden, Germany
- Died: November 22, 1943 (aged 77); Berlin, Germany
- Cause of death: World War II bombing of Berlin
- Occupation: Composer

Karl, Freiherr von Kaskel (October 10, 1866 - November 22, 1943) was a German composer. A native of Dresden, he studied at the Leipzig Conservatory and at the Cologne Conservatory before settling in Munich. Among his works is the opera Hochzeitsmorgen, to a libretto by Franz Koppel-Ellfeld, which was premiered in Dresden in 1893. Kaskel was killed during the bombing of Berlin during World War II.
