= Burjan (Mirpur) =

Burjan is a village in the Mirpur Tehsil of Mirpur District, Azad Kashmir, Pakistan.

== Demography ==
According to the 1998 census, its population was 970.

== History ==
Like many villages in the Mirpur region, many of its residents have emigrated to the United Kingdom.
