= Celda Klouček =

Czech designer, teacher, and paleontologist

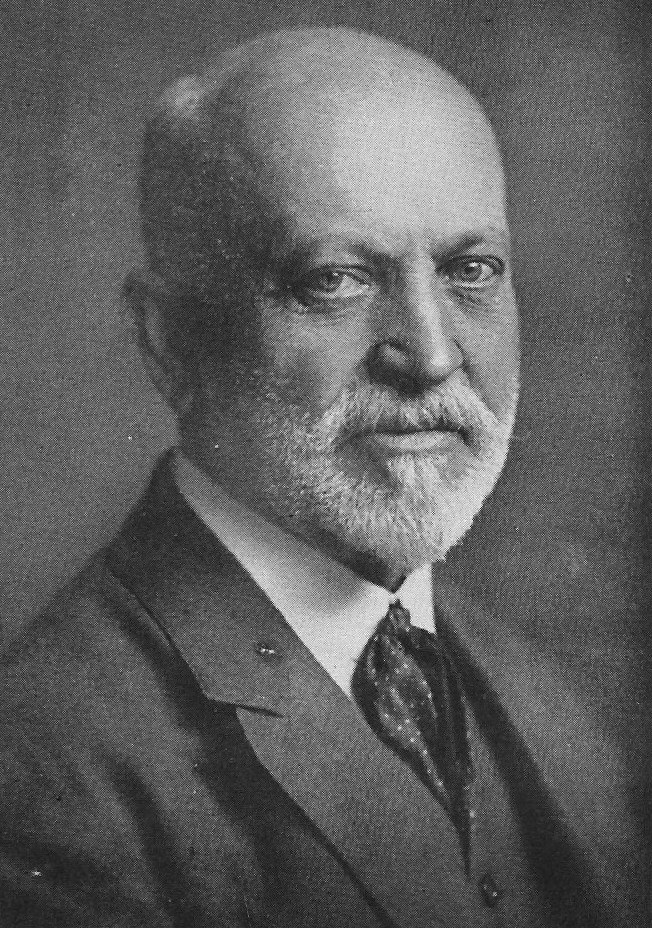
Celda Klouček (early 1920s)

Celda Klouček (born Celestýn Klouček; 6 December 1855, Senomaty – 14 October 1935, Prague) was a sculptor, designer, teacher, and paleontologist from Bohemia and later Czechoslovakia.

== Life and work ==
He began his studies at the Academy of Arts, Architecture and Design in Prague, then transferred to the School of Applied Arts in Vienna. There, he worked in the studios of Otto König from 1878 to 1881. In addition to his studio work, he taught decorative sculpting at the Kunstgewerbeschule in Frankfurt. From 1888 to 1916, he was a professor at his alma mater in Prague; overseeing a studio for decorative drawing and modeling. He was also involved in the ceramics studio, and worked together with Professor Emanuel Novák (1866–1918) in the Academy's artistic metal program.

Since he was a young boy, he had collected minerals and fossils. Through his own studies, and collaborations with the paleontologists at the National Museum, he developed into a knowledgeable researcher; publishing his own discoveries in the professional journals.

His works were mostly decorative and ornamental pieces, done in bas-relief. They are largely within the style of Historicism, primarily Renaissance and Baroque. He also designed stucco pieces for interiors and exteriors, fireplace masks and lamps, as well as other arts and crafts items. Around 1900, he began designing in the Art Nouveau style and exhibited at the Exposition Universelle in Paris. After World War I, he went into semi-retirement, taking only small, private, commissions.

== Selected projects ==
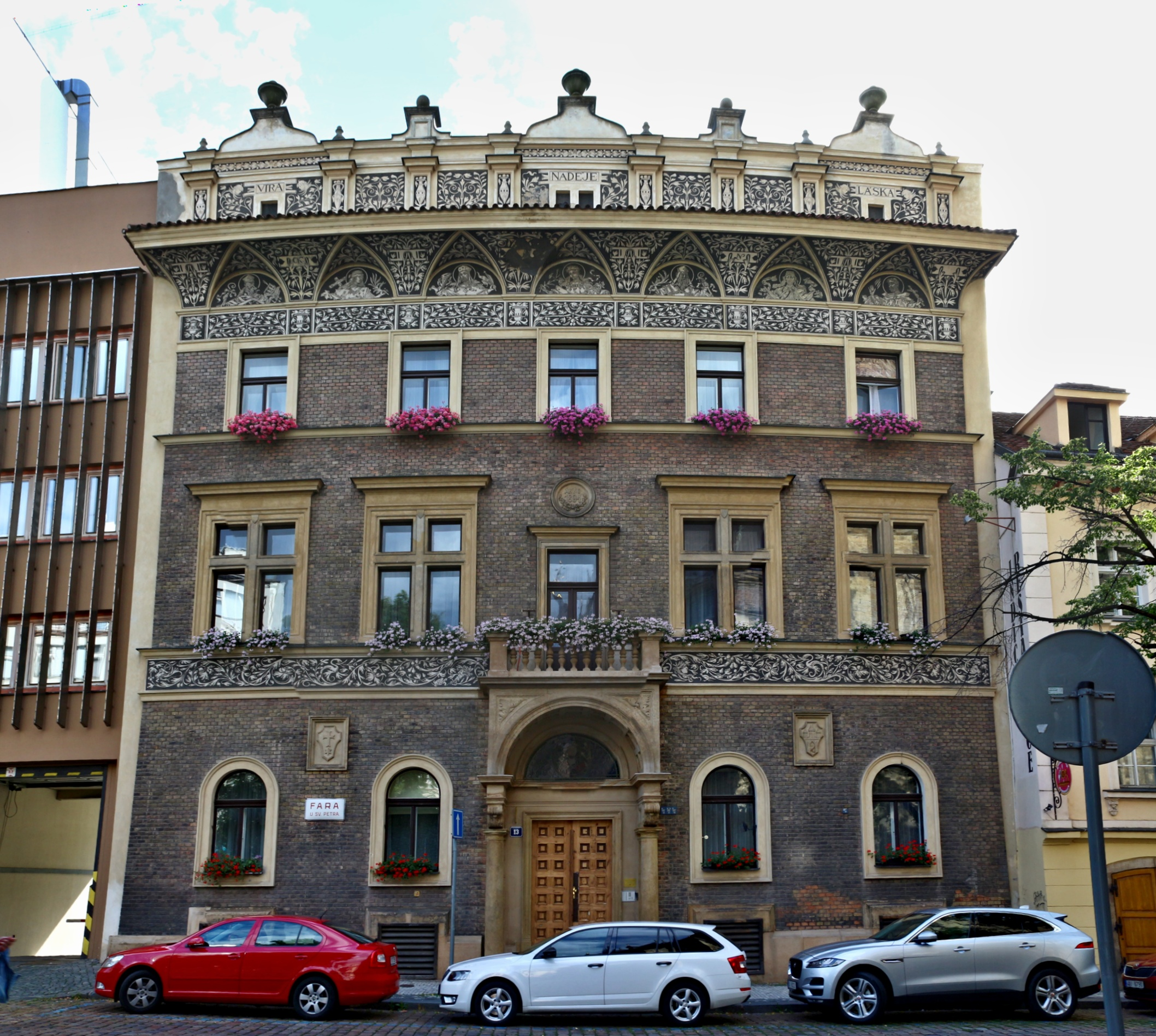
Façade at the Rectory of St. Peter, Prague

His works, and works by his students, based on his designs, have been preserved throughout Prague, Plzeň, and Vienna.

- Building of the former Zemská Banka, by Osvald Polívka
- Building of the former Prague Municipal Credit Union, by Antonín Wiehl
- Head office of the Prague Credit Bank
- Dietrichstein Palace, today the seat of the Apostolic Nunciature.
- Decorations at the West Bohemian Museum in Plzeň
- Decorations in the Imperial Suites at the Hofburg.

== Sources ==
- Celda Klouček, sochař, návrhář, paleontolog: Exhibition catalog for his 155th anniversary, West Bohemian Museum, Plzeň, 2010
- Jaroslav Perner, Celda Klouček paleontolog, Czech Academy of Sciences and Arts, Prague, 1937 (Online)
