= Vilém Burian =

Czech ice hockey player

- Born: August 16, 1988 (age 36); Zlín, Czechoslovakia
- Height: 6 ft 4 in (193 cm)
- Weight: 198 lb (90 kg; 14 st 2 lb)
- Position: Forward
- Shoots: Left
- Czech Extraliga team: HC České Budějovice
- Playing career: 2010–present

Vilém Burian (born August 16, 1988) is a Czech professional ice hockey player. He played with HC České Budějovice in the Czech Extraliga during the 2010–11 Czech Extraliga season.
