= Jan Burian =

Czech musician and television presenter (born 1952)

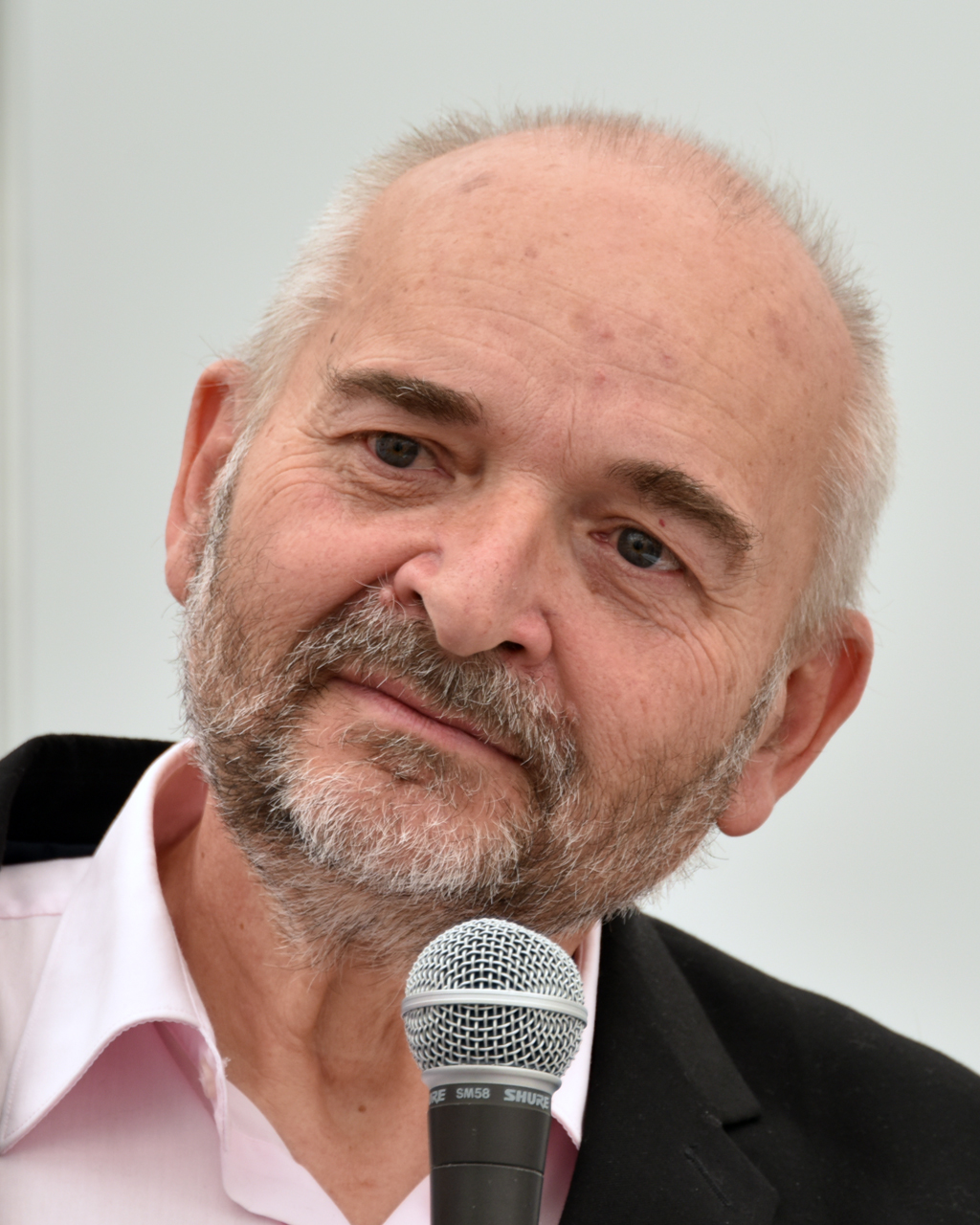
Jan Burian (2019)

Jan Burian (born March 26, 1952) is a Czech pianist, lyricist, songwriter, TV presenter.

== Biography ==
Burian was born in Prague, Czechoslovakia, the son of Emil František Burian.

He performed in tandem with Jiří Dědeček in the years 1973-1985.

Czech Television aired his talk show "Sitting with Jan Burian" and the series "Burian Women's Day". He featured the awarding of literary prizes Magnesia Litera for several seasons.
