= Emil František Burian =

Czech poet, musician and playwright (1904–1959)

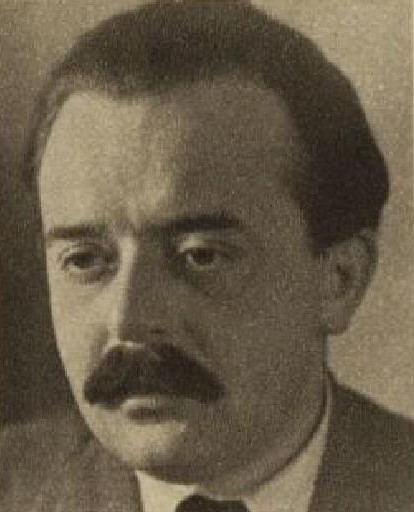
- Born: 11 June 1904; Plzeň, Bohemia, Austria-Hungary
- Died: 9 August 1959 (aged 55); Prague, Czechoslovakia
- Resting place: Vyšehrad Cemetery
- Children: Jan Burian, Kateřina Burianová
- Parent: Emil Burian

Emil František Burian (11 June 1904 – 9 August 1959) was a Czech poet, journalist, singer, actor, musician, composer, dramatic adviser, playwright and director. He was also a longtime activist in the Communist Party of Czechoslovakia.

== Early life and career ==
Burian was born in Plzeň, Czechoslovakia, where he came from a musical family. His father, Emil Burian, was an opera singer. E. F. Burian himself is the father of singer and writer Jan Burian. He studied under the tutelage of J. B. Foerster at Prague Conservatory, whence he graduated in 1927, but had begun participating in cultural life much sooner. Along with Karel Teige and Vítězslav Nezval, E. F. Burian was a key member of Devětsil, an association of Czech avant-garde artists in the 1920s.

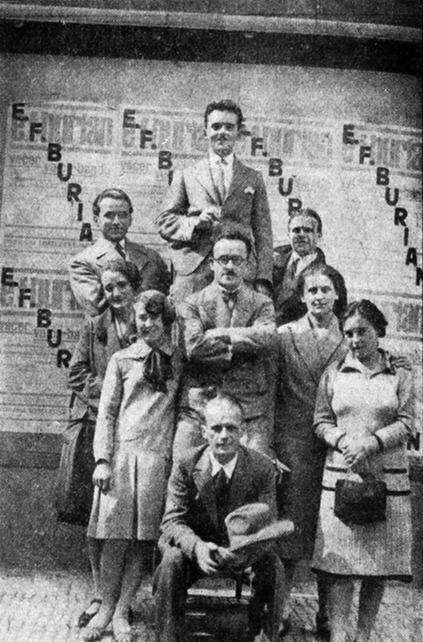
The Voiceband of E. F. Burian at a festival in Siena in 1928

In 1926–1927 he worked with Osvobozené divadlo, but after disputes with Jindřich Honzl, he and Jiří Frejka left the theatre. Later they founded their own theatre, Da-Da. He also worked with the Moderní studio theatre scene. In 1927 he founded the musical and elocutionary ensemble Voiceband.

In 1923 Burian joined the Communist Party of Czechoslovakia. His work, strongly influenced by communist ideas, bordered on political agitation. In May 1933 he founded the D 34 theatre, with a strongly leftist-oriented program.

== Life in concentration camps ==
In 1941 Burian was arrested and spent the rest of World War II in Nazi concentration camps at Theresienstadt, Dachau and finally in Neuengamme. He helped to organize illegal cultural programs for the inmates. In 1945, he survived the RAF attack against the prison ship Cap Arcona, and returned to Czechoslovakia, where he was already presumed dead.

== Post-war period ==
After the war, he founded D 46 and D 47 theatre, and led theatres in Brno and the operetta house in Karlín. After the communist putsch in 1948, he worked as a member of the Czechoslovak communist parliament. In the post-war period, he became one of the leading promoters of the communist cultural nomenclature. He attempted to reorganize theatres, with a goal of placing communists into leadership posts of theatres.

Burian died in 1959 in Prague.

== Work ==
His work, deeply influenced by dadaism, futurism and poetism, was leftist-oriented. After the war it proved to agitate Communist ideas. He had a strong influence on Czech modern theatre, and his innovative staging methods (work with metaphor, poetry, and symbols) and inventions (theatergraph, voiceband) are inspirational for the theatre even now.

== Selected discography ==
=== Works recorded during his lifetime ===
- The Orchestr Osvobozeného Divadla (Orchestra of the Liberated Theater), led by Jaroslav Ježek, Kdybych Se Byl Nenarodil and Má Panna Je V Panama Sama (Ultraphon, 1930)
- The Orchestr Gramoklubu, led by Jan Šíma, Půlnoční Blues (Ultraphon, ca. 1932)
