= Švihov =

Švihov may refer to places in the Czech Republic:

- Švihov (Klatovy District), a town in the Plzeň Region
  - Švihov Castle in the town
- Švihov (Rakovník District), a municipality and village in the Central Bohemian Region
- Švihov, a village and part of Drslavice (Prachatice District) in the South Bohemian Region
- Švihov, a village and part of Miřetice (Chrudim District) in the Pardubice Region
- Švihov Reservoir, a reservoir in the Vysočina and Central Bohemian regions
