= Drslavice =

Drslavice may refer to places in the Czech Republic:

- Drslavice (Prachatice District), a municipality and village in the South Bohemian Region
- Drslavice (Uherské Hradiště District), a municipality and village in the Zlín Region
- Drslavice, a village and part of Klatovy in the Plzeň Region
