= Lhovice =

- Village
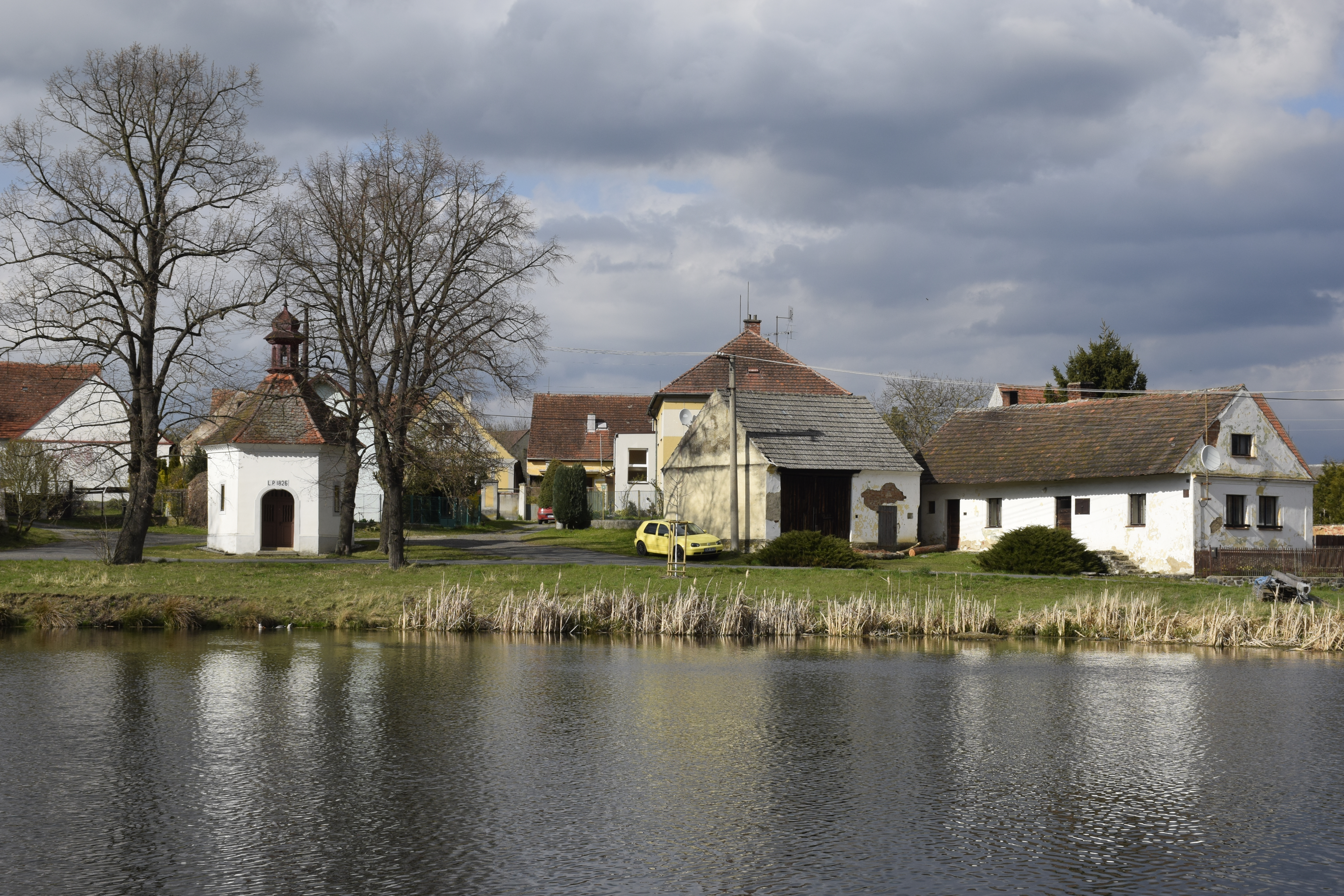
- Centre of Lhovice

- Location in the Czech Republic
- Coordinates: 49°30′15″N 13°16′9″E
- Country: Czech Republic
- Region: Plzeň
- District: Klatovy
- Municipality: Švihov
- First mentioned: 1194

Area
  - Total: 4.46 km^{2} (1.72 sq mi)

Population (2021)
  - Total: 172
  - Density: 38.6/km^{2} (99.9/sq mi)
- Time zone: UTC+1 (CET)
  - Summer (DST): UTC+2 (CEST)
- Postal code: 340 12

Lhovice is a village and administrative part of Švihov in Klatovy District in the Plzeň Region of the Czech Republic. It has about 200 inhabitants.

== History ==
The first written mention of Lhovice is from 1194. The village was also formerly called Mlhovice and Elhovice.

== Gallery ==
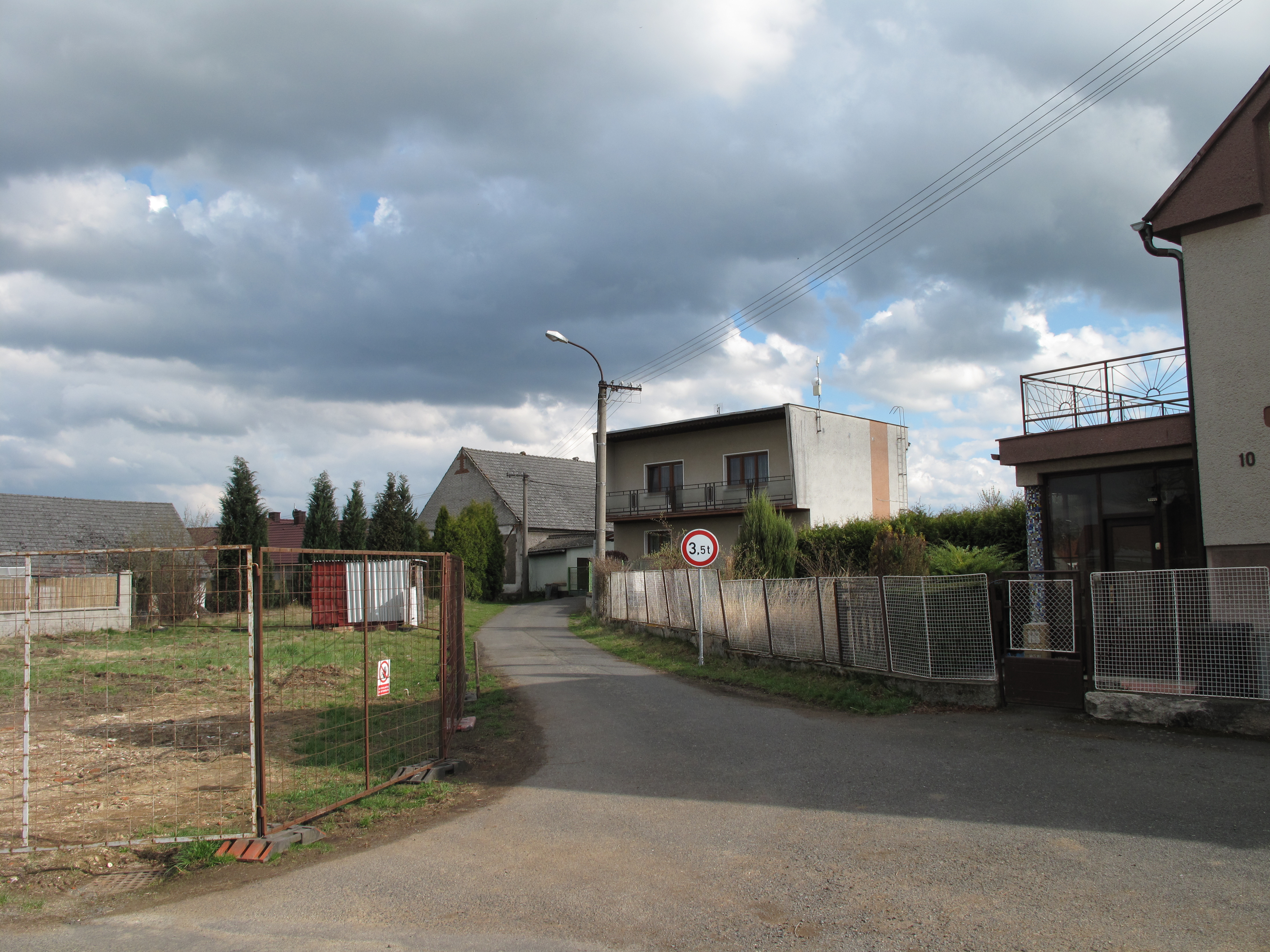
A street

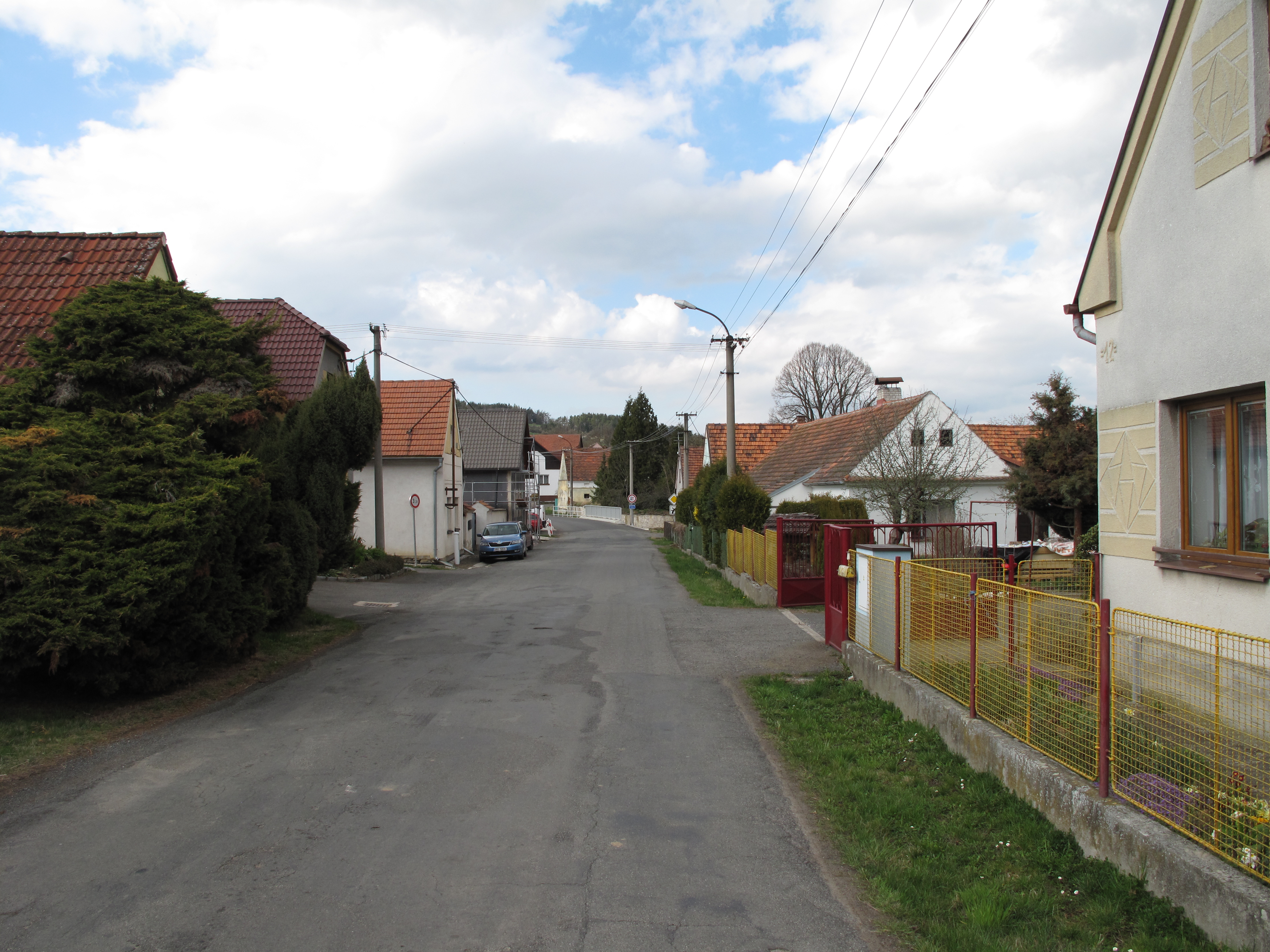
Main road
