= Švihov Castle =

Castle in the Czech Republic

- Hrad Švihov
- Švihov, Plzeň Region in Czech Republic

Site information
- Type: Water castle
- Condition: Preserved
- Website: www.hrad-svihov.cz/en

Location
- Coordinates: 49°28′44″N 13°17′06″E

Site history
- Built: 1480–1489
- Built by: Půta Švihovský of Rýzmberk
- Architect: Benedikt Ried
- Materials: Stone

Švihov Castle (Czech: hrad Švihov; German: Schwihau) is a Gothic water castle in Švihov in the Plzeň Region of the Czech Republic.

== History ==
Švihov Castle was built by the Rýzmberk of Skála noble family. It was besieged by the Hussites during the Hussite Wars, the garrison surrendered after the water moats were siphoned. It was rebuilt between 1480 and 1489 by the order of the castle's owner, Půta Švihovský of Rýzmberk, in the late Gothic style. His sons continued rebuilding the castle after he died and invited the famous architect Benedikt Rejt. In 1598, the Kavka of Říčany family took control of the castle, but were forced to sell it to the Czernin family 50 years later in 1598, due to their poor management. Then the Thirty Years' War came and the castle was unsuccessfully besieged by the Swedish army.

Benedikt Rejt invented the castle's moat system with bastions (horseshoe-shaped ground plans opening into the keep). He finished his works by 1520. He used the same system when he designed the fortification of Rabí Castle, one of the largest castles in Bohemia.

After the war, Emperor Ferdinand III ordered the demolition of the castle, possibly out of fear of it being an "unconquerable fort of anti-Habsburg resistance". Luckily, thanks to the constant postponement of the demolition, only part of the rampart was damaged. Castle palaces, chapel and other parts of the bastion were used as a granary, devaluating the whole complex, yet protecting it from being rebuilt. The castle stayed in Czernin's hands until the nationalization in 1945.

== Architecture ==
The castle consists of two residential palaces, five-level entrance tower and a chapel built on top of the bastion. Only small parts of the rampart remained undamaged with four bastions -The Red Bastion, The White Bastion, The Green Bastion and The Gold Bastion (whose remains were discovered in 1951). There were two water moats around the castle. The inner moat was placed where today's inner courtyard is and the outer moat was between the inner and outer rampart (of which a part is still standing). If needed, the moats could be filled with water from three nearby ponds.

The castle's interior consists of typical late Gothic and Renaissance furnishings: furniture, rich tapestries, pewter and copper kitchenware, weapons and arms. Valuable wall paintings from the 16th century can be found in The Red Bastion, the chapel and in other rooms. Open to the public are the castle's armory, the kitchen (with original furnishings that originate mainly from the 18th century), the feast hall, the chapel, the bed chambers and The Great Hall with wooden cassette ceiling that originates from Dobrovice Castle.

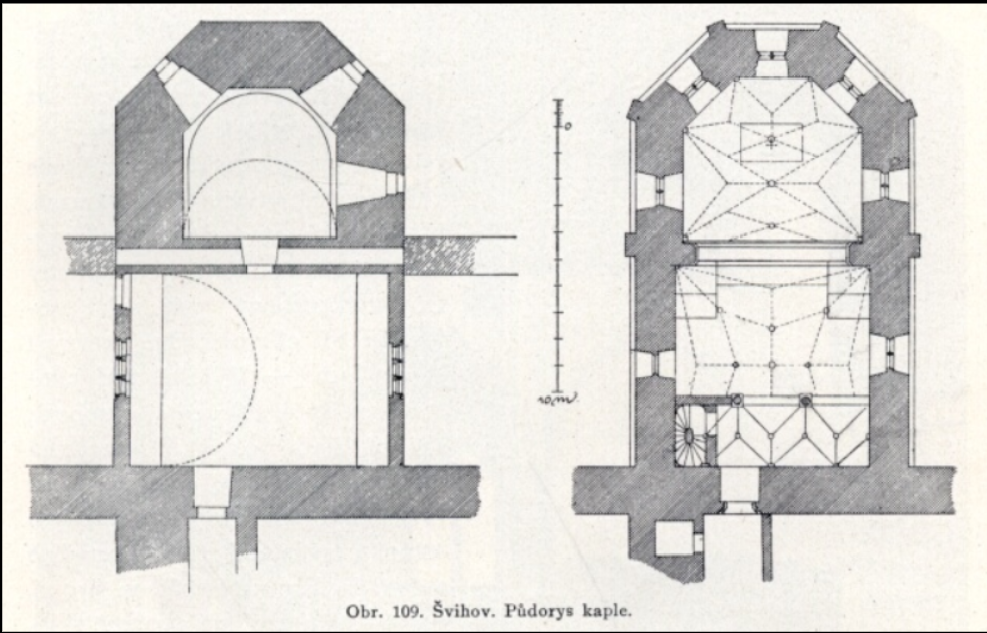
Ground plan (chapel)

The castle's chapel was built between 1480 and 1489 by Půta von Schwihau The exterior of the chapel remained mostly undamaged, the interior in the other hand was until its reconstruction in 1890. The stairs leading to the chapel were destroyed as well. The entrance hall has a net vault, its ribs lean onto decorated consoles and converge into one painted keystone. The nave of the chapel is also vaulted, but all four ribs were rough-hewed for unknown reasons.

== Gallery ==
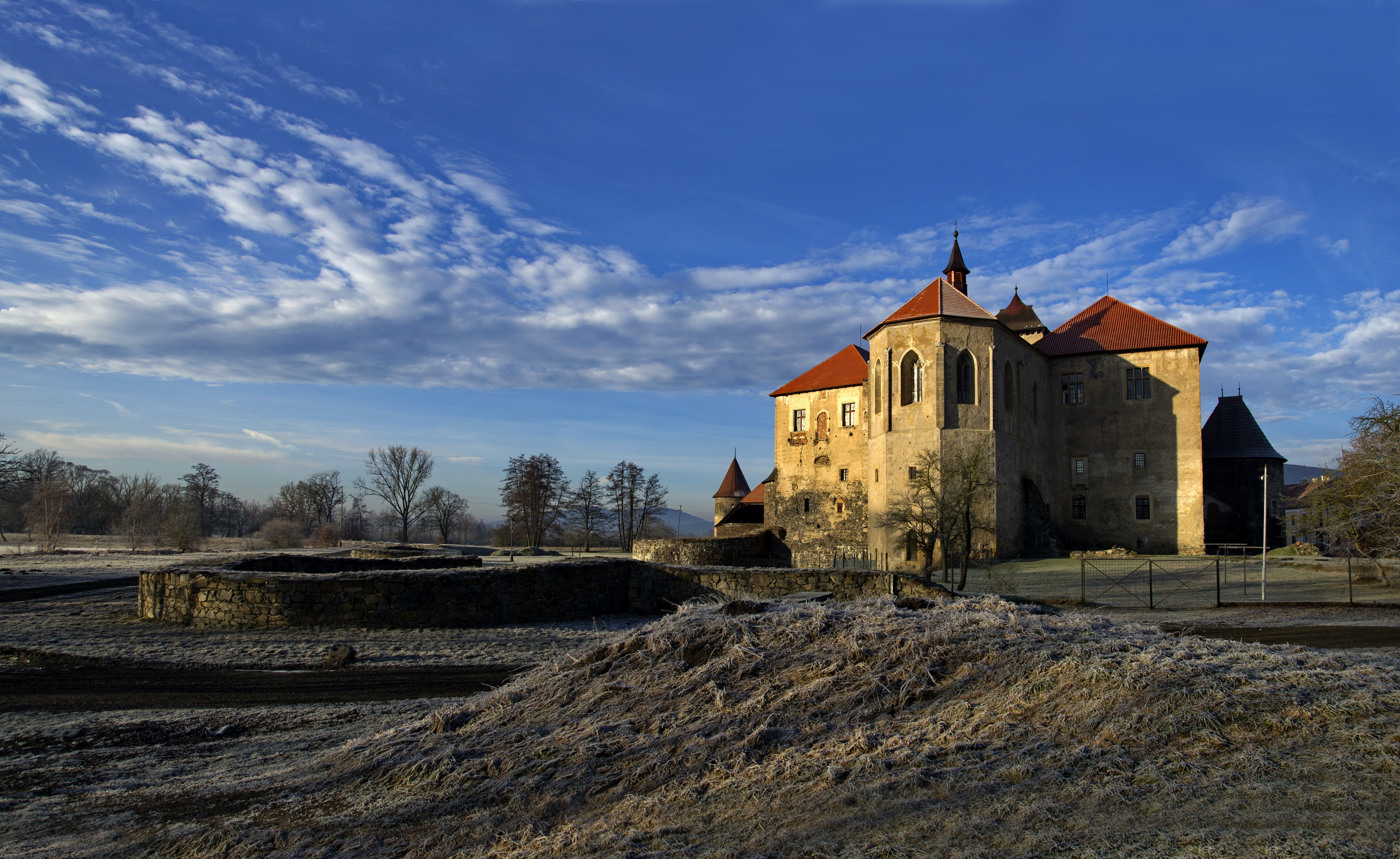
East view

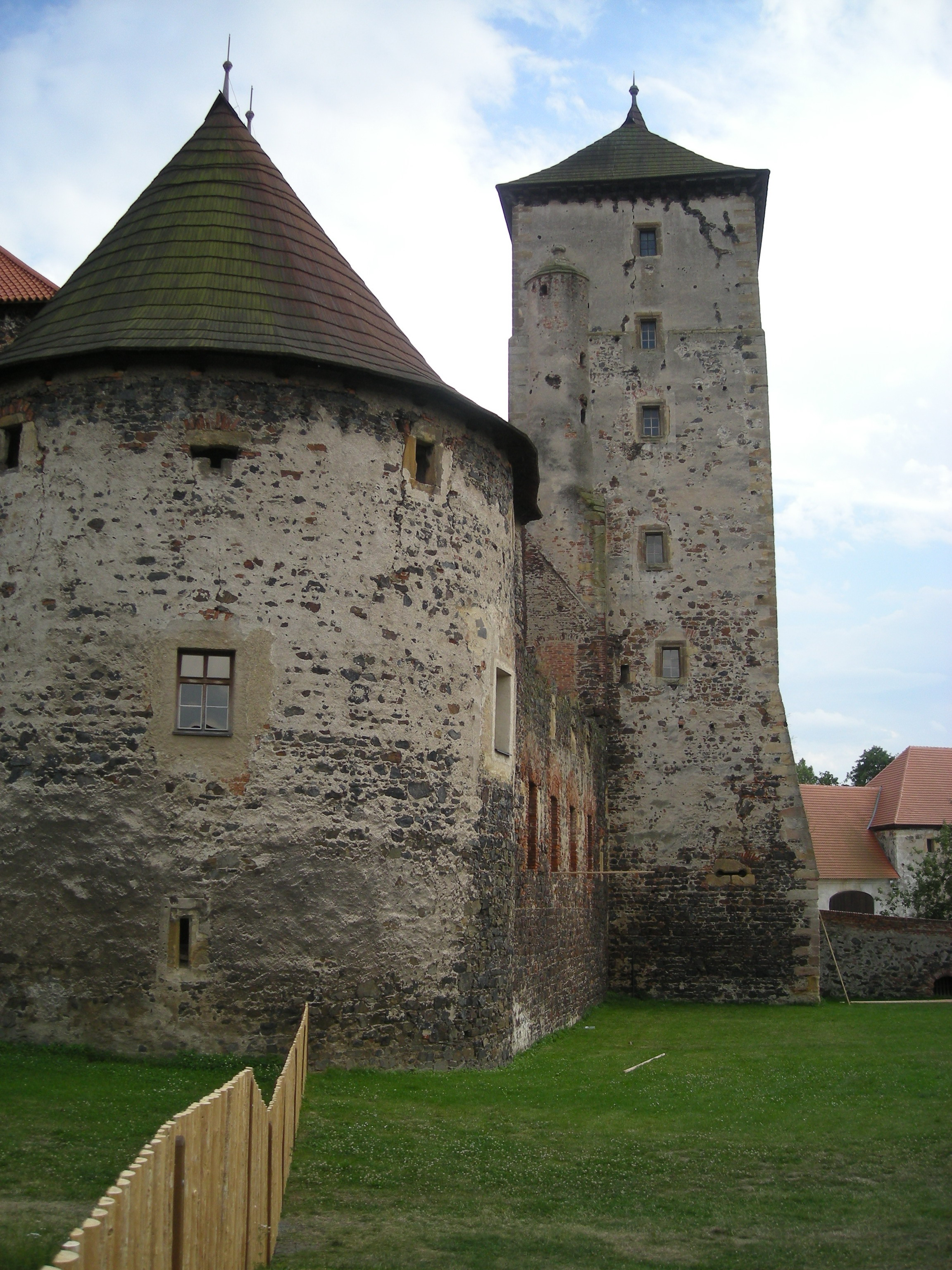
Entrance tower

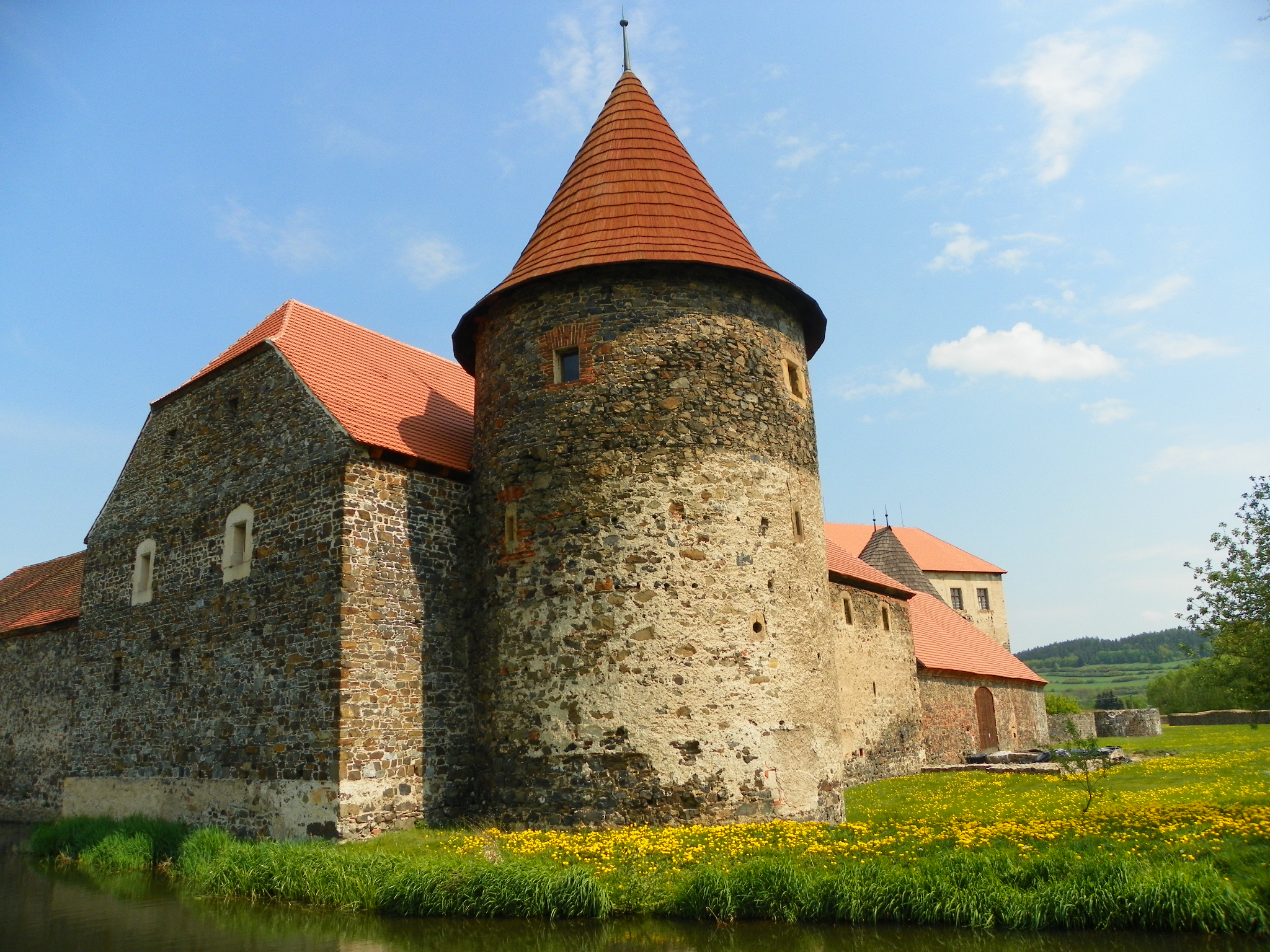

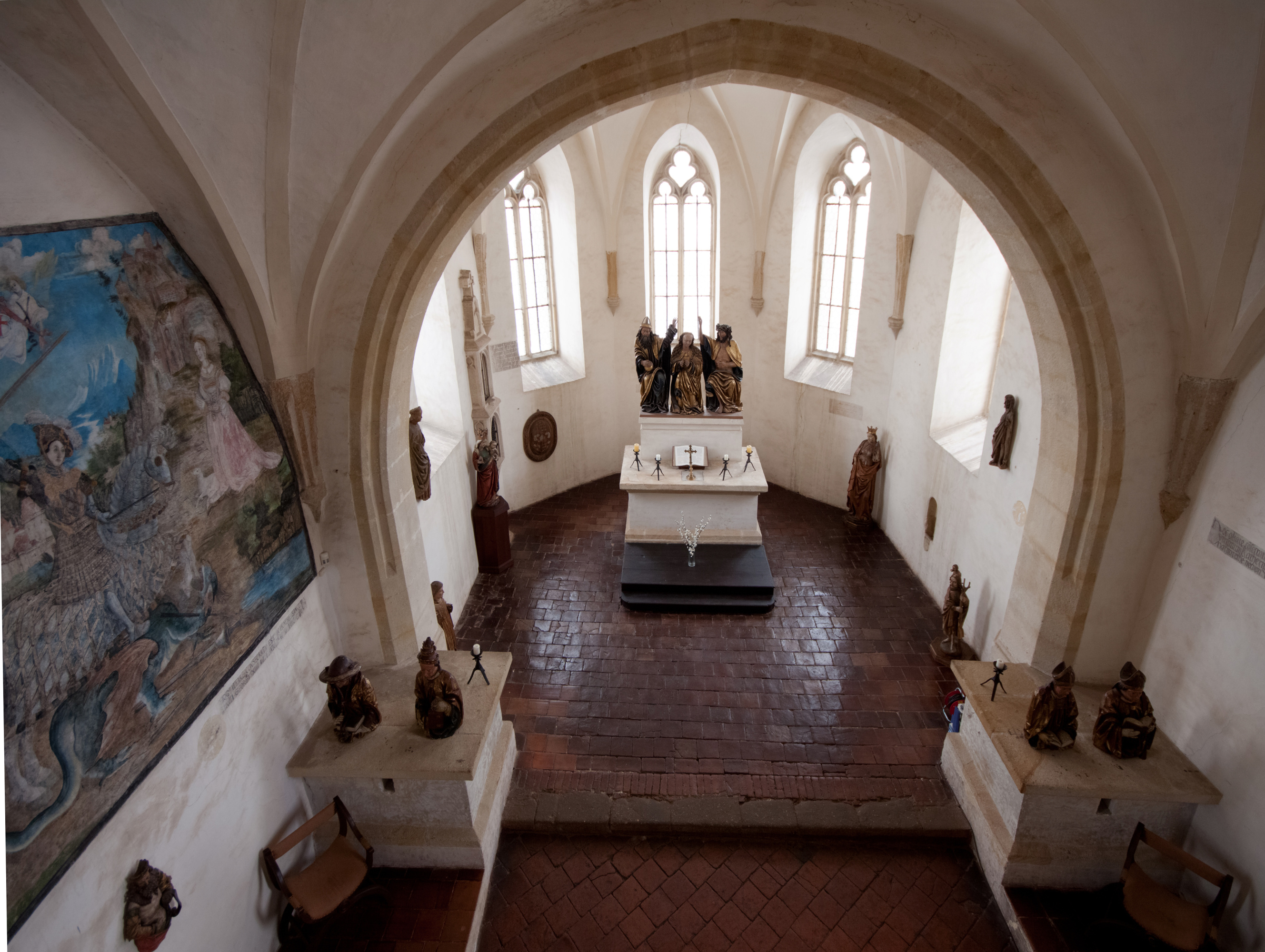
Interior of the chapel

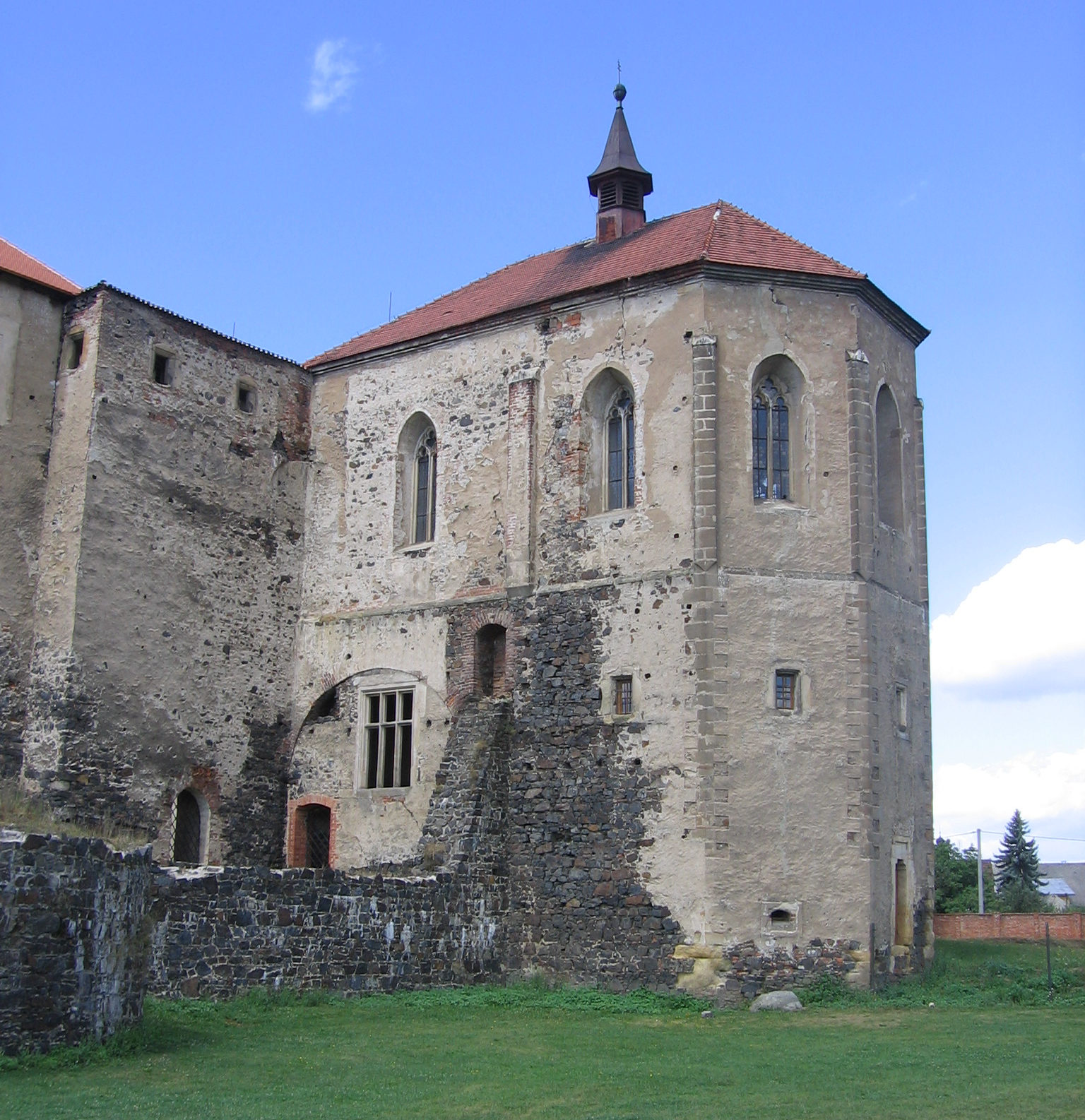
Exterior

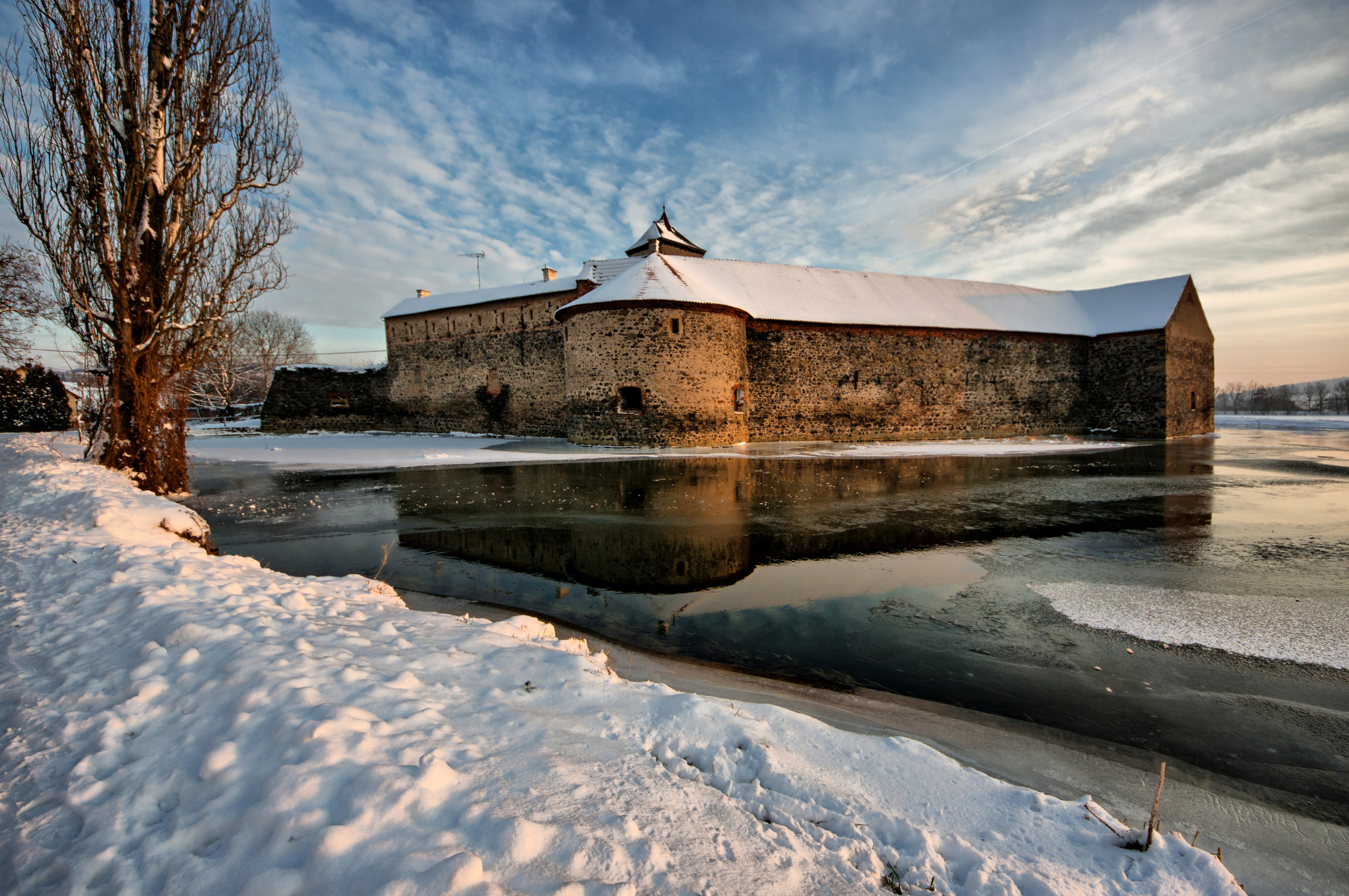
Švihov Castle

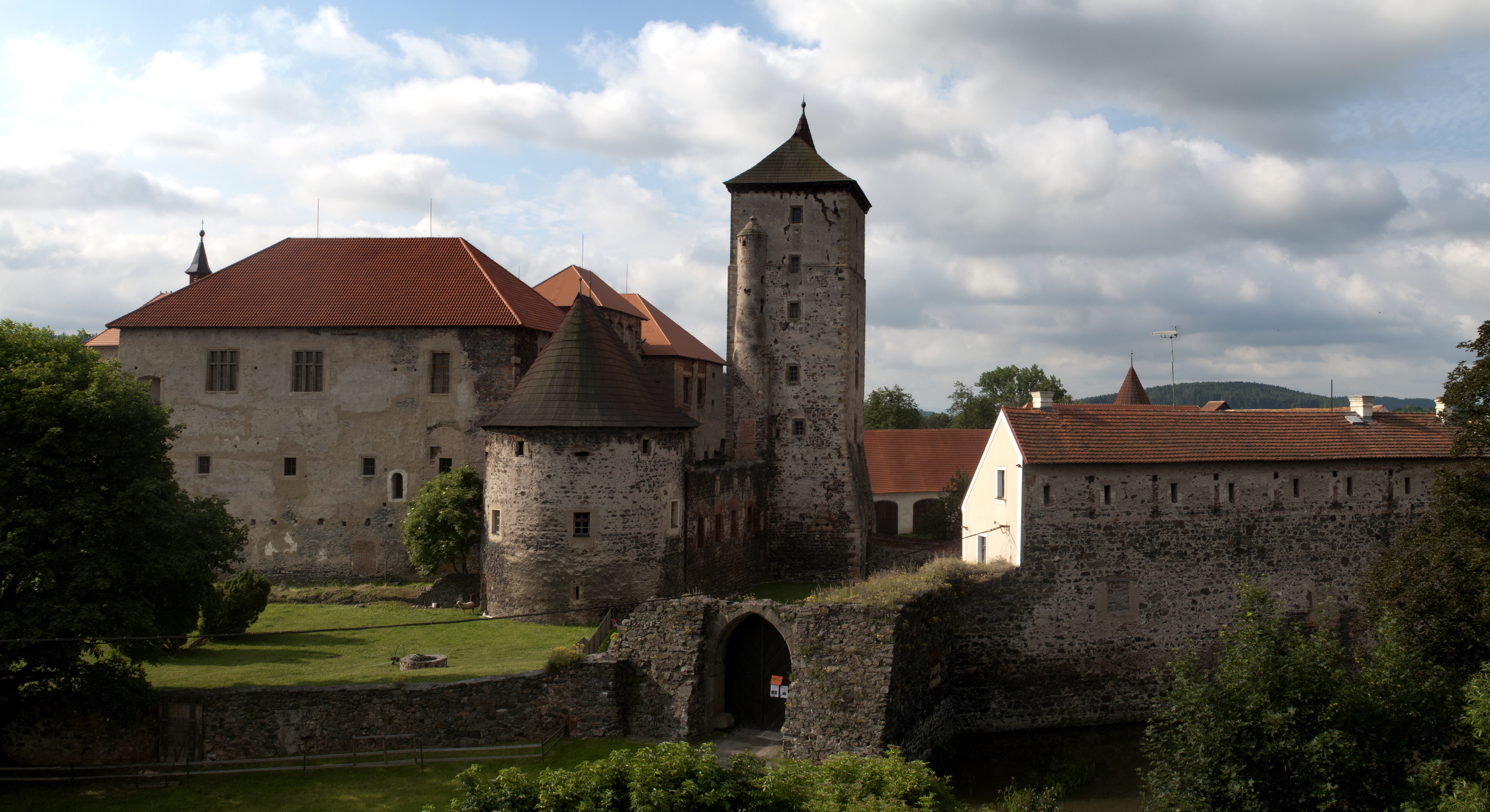
Švihov Castle

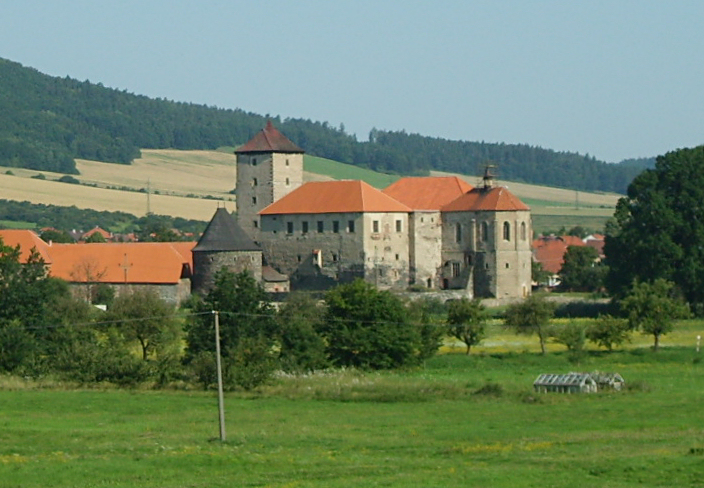

Dance Hall with Renaissance coffered ceiling

Late Gothic mural fragment in the Red Bastion

Inner courtyard

Castle interior

== See also ==
- Blatná Castle
- Červená Lhota Castle
