= Švihov (Klatovy District) =

- Town
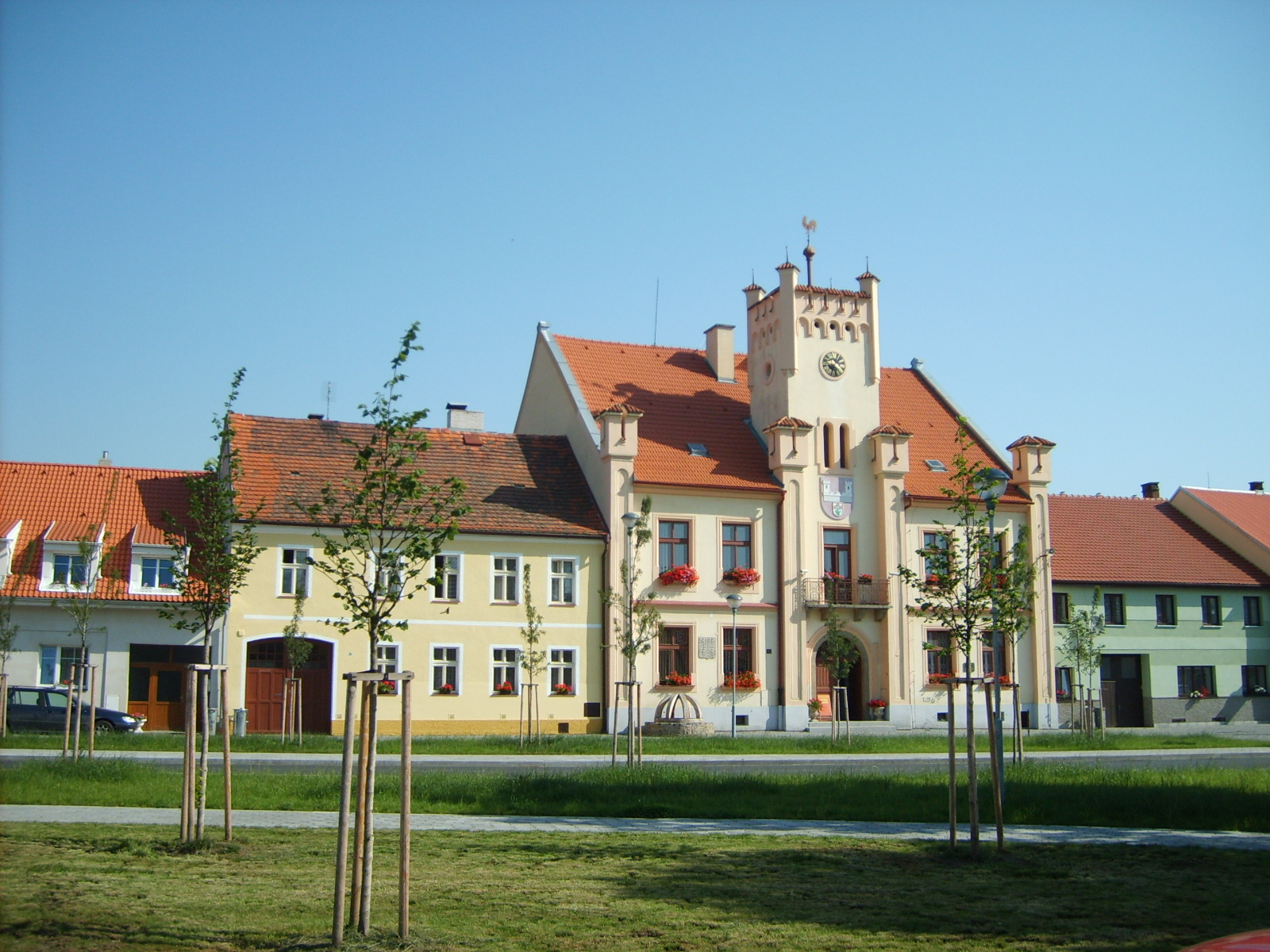
- Town hall

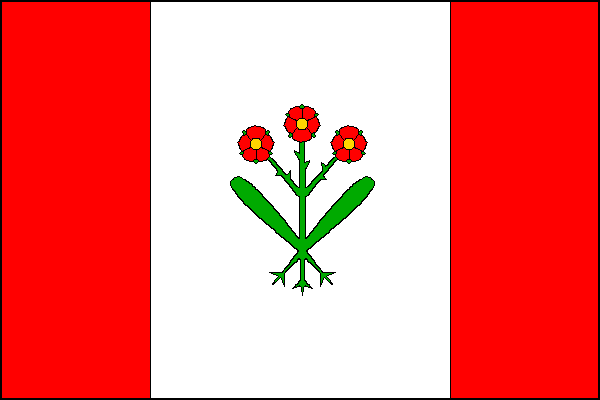
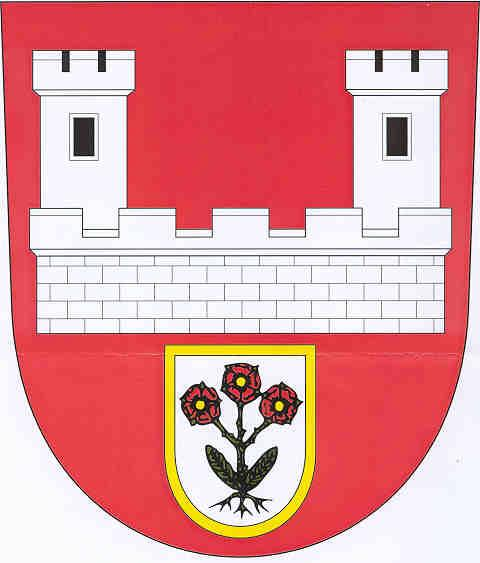
- Flag Coat of arms

- Location in the Czech Republic
- Coordinates: 49°28′53″N 13°17′2″E
- Country: Czech Republic
- Region: Plzeň
- District: Klatovy
- First mentioned: 1245

Government
  - Mayor: Václav Petrus

Area
  - Total: 34.53 km^{2} (13.33 sq mi)
- Elevation: 374 m (1,227 ft)

Population (2026-01-01)
  - Total: 1,673
  - Density: 48.45/km^{2} (125.5/sq mi)
- Time zone: UTC+1 (CET)
  - Summer (DST): UTC+2 (CEST)
- Postal code: 340 12
- Website: www.svihov.cz

Švihov (Czech pronunciation: [ˈʃvɪɦof]; German: Schwihau) is a town in Klatovy District in the Plzeň Region of the Czech Republic. It has about 1,700 inhabitants. The town is located on the Úhlava River in the Švihov Highlands. Švihov is known for the medieval Švihov Castle.

== Administrative division ==
Švihov consists of 11 municipal parts (in brackets population according to the 2021 census):

- Švihov (1,152)
- Bezděkov (12)
- Jíno (27)
- Kaliště (39)
- Kamýk (38)
- Kokšín (74)
- Lhovice (172)
- Stropčice (82)
- Těšnice (7)
- Třebýcinka (53)
- Vosí (9)

== Etymology ==
Švihov got its name from its location in the valley where "the winds swished" (in Czech švihaly větry).

== Geography ==
Švihov is located about 9 kilometres (6 mi) north of Klatovy and 28 km (17 mi) south of Plzeň. It lies in the heart of the Švihov Highlands. The highest point is the hill Tuhošť at 601 m (1,972 ft) above sea level. The town is situated on the left bank of the Úhlava River.

== History ==
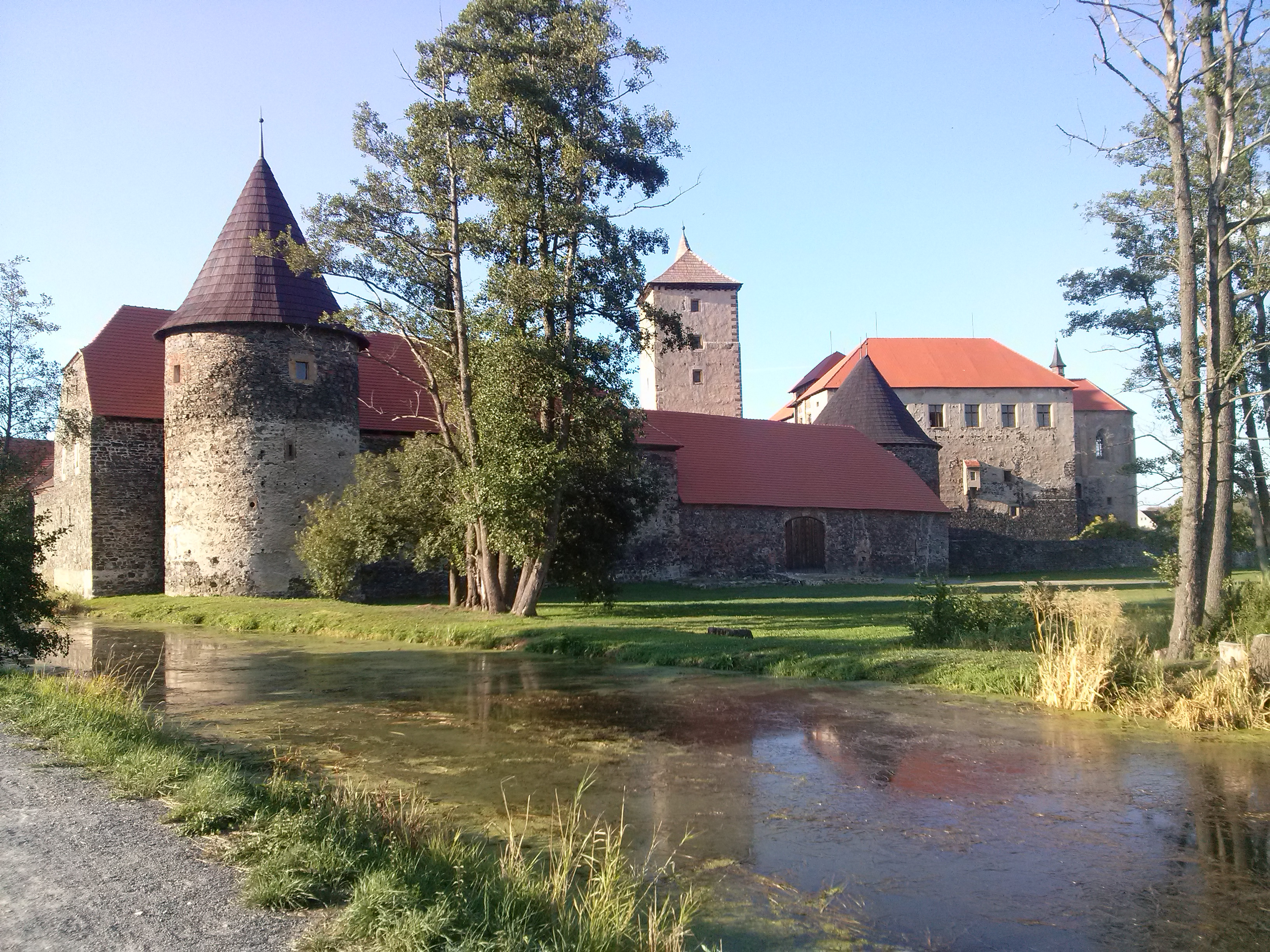
Švihov Castle

The first written mention of Švihov is from 1245, however, a manor house probably existed here already in 1194. In the first half of the 14th century, Vilém of Švihov had a fortress built here and intended that Švihov would become the centre of a large estate. In 1367, Švihov was referred to as a town for the first time, but due to the proximity of Klatovy, it remained a small and poor town.

Švihov was owned by the Švihovský of Rýzmberk family until 1425, when it was conquered by the Hussites. In 1436, after the Hussite Wars, the family got Švihov back. Půta Švihovský of Rýzmberk had a massive castle built on the site of the fortress in the 1480s. This construction caused great debt, and the family had to sell Švihov in 1548. It was purchased by Heralt Kavka of Říčany and Štekeň, then it was purchased by the Czernin family in 1598. The castle ceased to be a feudal seat and the importance of the town declined.

During the Thirty Years' War, the Swedish army plundered the town, but failed to capture the castle. Emperor Ferdinand III ordered the demolition of the castle in 1655, but due to delays it never happened. However, the castle remained uninhabited, and in 1662 it was described as ruined. Its premises were used as granaries from the 18th century, which saved it from complete destruction. The Czernin family owned Švihov until 1918.

== Demographics ==
Historical population

Year	Pop.	±%
1869	2,802	—
1880	2,969	+6.0%
1890	2,887	−2.8%
1900	2,734	−5.3%
1910	2,716	−0.7%

Year	Pop.	±%
1921	2,868	+5.6%
1930	2,870	+0.1%
1950	2,340	−18.5%
1961	2,334	−0.3%
1970	2,012	−13.8%

Year	Pop.	±%
1980	1,808	−10.1%
1991	1,615	−10.7%
2001	1,633	+1.1%
2011	1,645	+0.7%
2021	1,665	+1.2%

Source: Censuses

== Transport ==
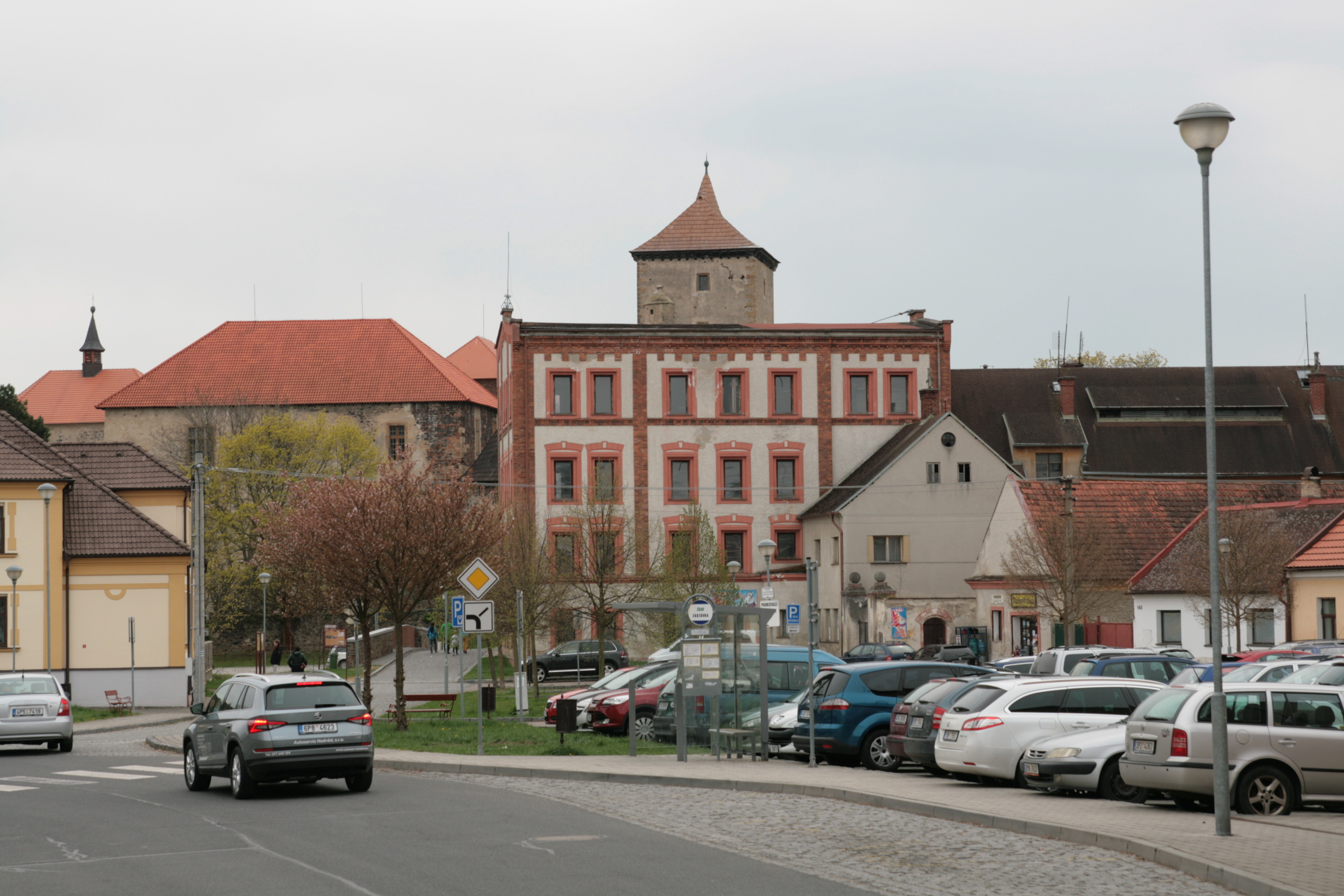
Town square

The I/27 road (the section from Plzeň to Klatovy, part of the European route E53) runs through the town.

Švihov is located on the railway line Prague–Plzeň–Železná Ruda and thus has a direct connection to the capital.

== Sights ==
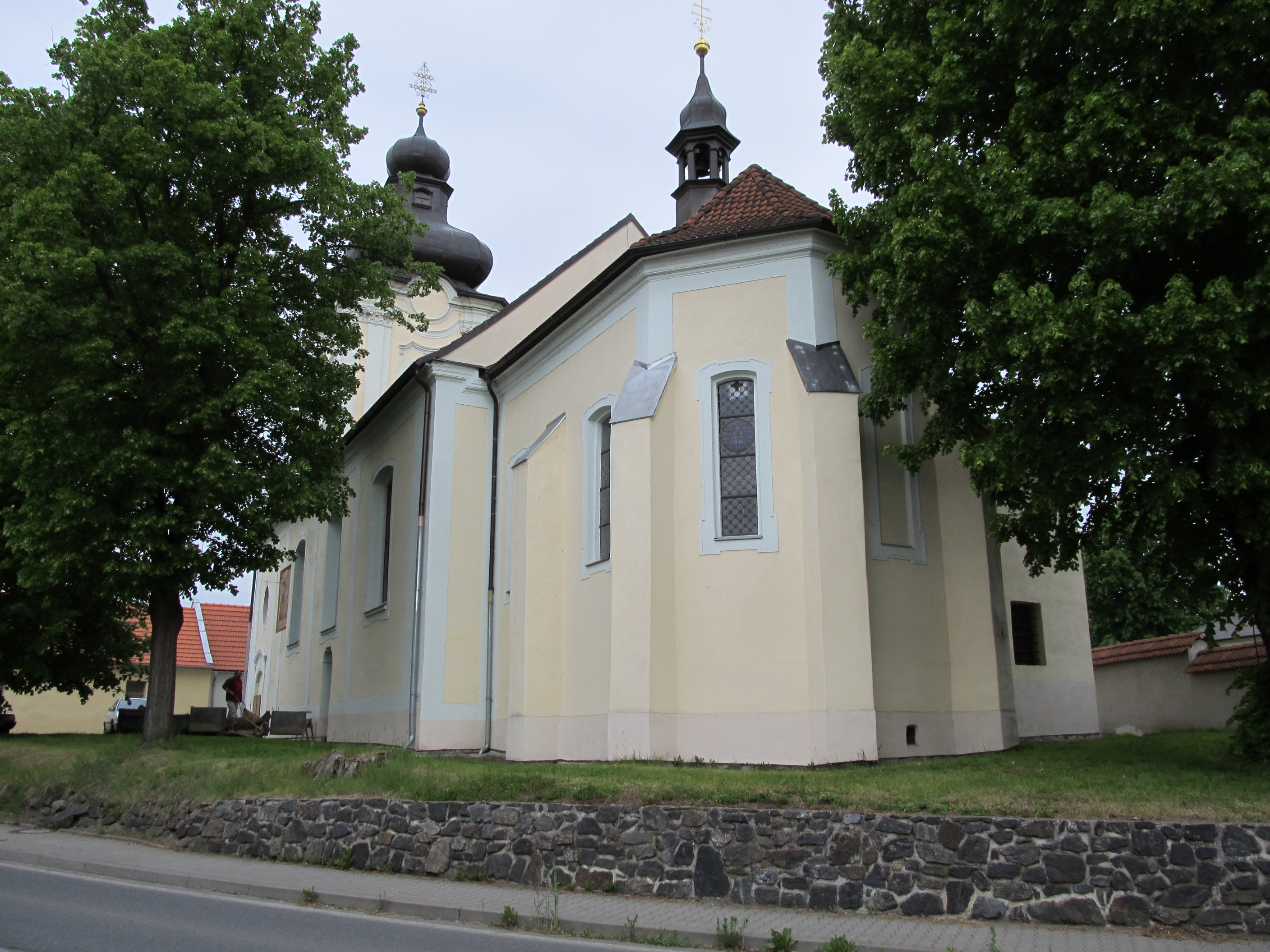
Church of Saint Wenceslaus

The main landmark of Švihov is the Švihov Castle. The Gothic water castle was built in 1480–1489 and the defense system of the castle was completed with the help of Benedikt Rejt in 1504. Since 1949, it has been owned and administered by the state. The castle is open to the public and offers guided tours.

The Church of Saint Wenceslaus was originally a Gothic building. After it was damaged by a fire, it was completely rebuilt in the late Baroque style in 1744–1747, probably by František Maxmilián Kaňka.
