= Švihov (Rakovník District) =

- Municipality
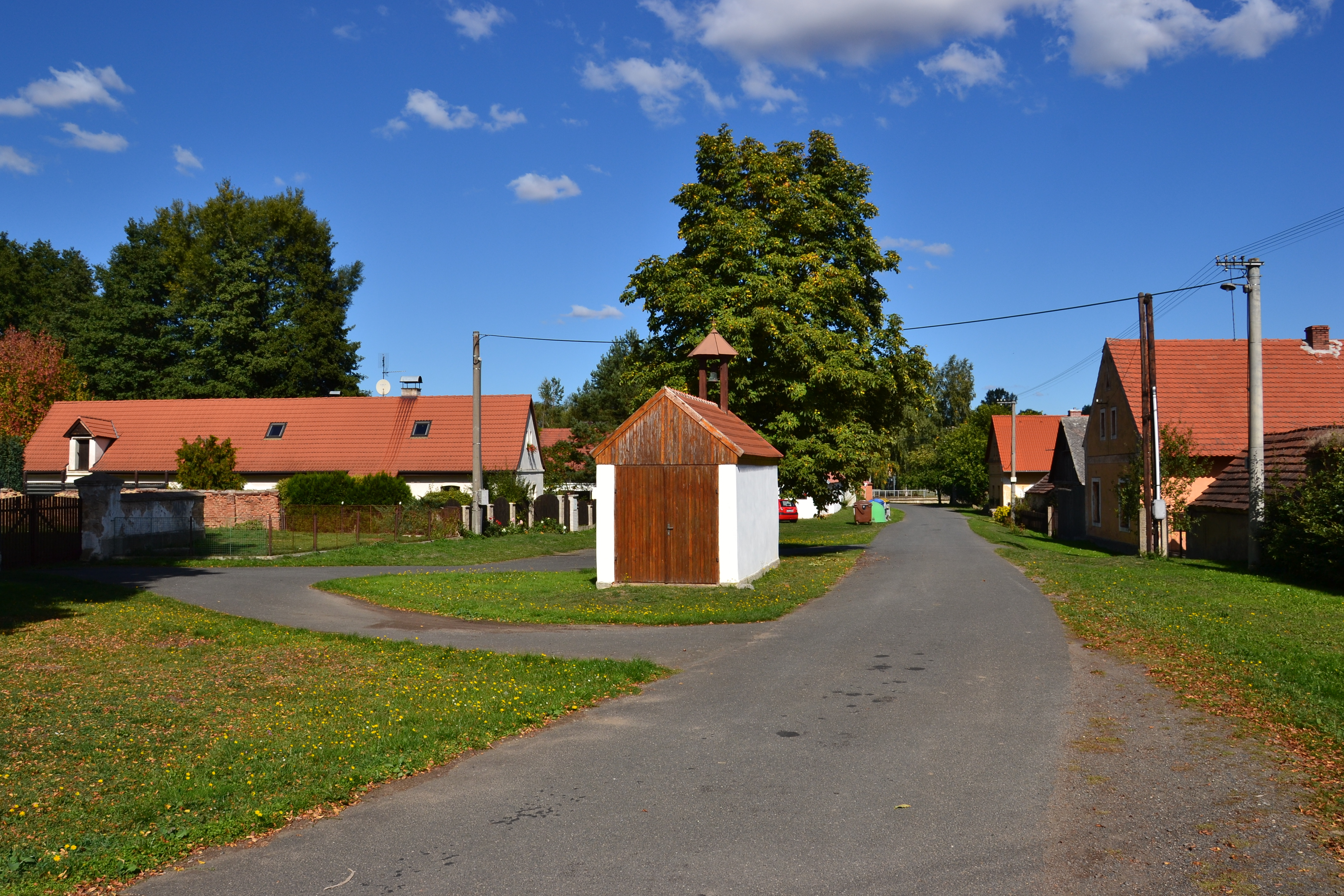
- Centre of Švihov

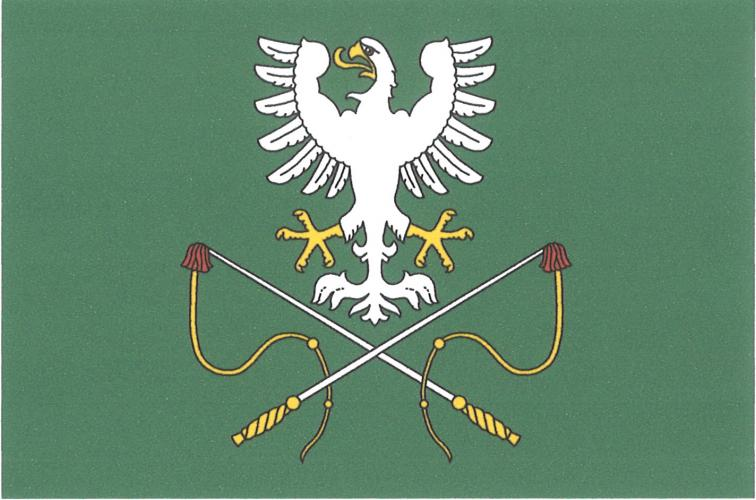
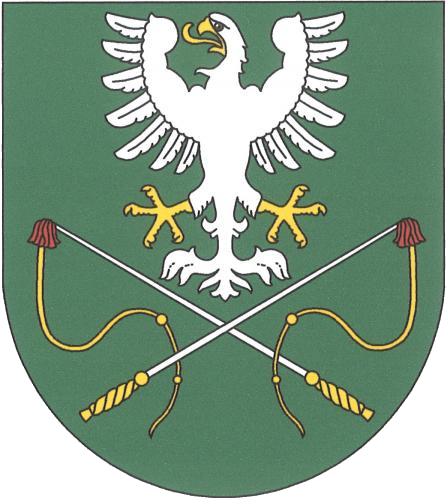
- Flag Coat of arms

- Location in the Czech Republic
- Coordinates: 50°6′36″N 13°33′52″E
- Country: Czech Republic
- Region: Central Bohemian
- District: Rakovník
- First mentioned: 1405

Area
  - Total: 2.96 km^{2} (1.14 sq mi)
- Elevation: 375 m (1,230 ft)

Population (2026-01-01)
  - Total: 74
  - Density: 25/km^{2} (65/sq mi)
- Time zone: UTC+1 (CET)
  - Summer (DST): UTC+2 (CEST)
- Postal code: 270 33
- Website: www.obec-svihov.cz

Švihov is a municipality and village in Rakovník District in the Central Bohemian Region of the Czech Republic. It has about 70 inhabitants.

== Demographics ==
Historical population
| Year | Pop. | ±% |
|---|---|---|
| 1869 | 168 | — |
| 1880 | 178 | +6.0% |
| 1890 | 178 | +0.0% |
| 1900 | 170 | −4.5% |
| 1910 | 199 | +17.1% |
| 1921 | 212 | +6.5% |
| 1930 | 190 | −10.4% |
| 1950 | 143 | −24.7% |
| 1961 | 116 | −18.9% |
| 1970 | 97 | −16.4% |
| 1980 | 81 | −16.5% |
| 1991 | 77 | −4.9% |
| 2001 | 50 | −35.1% |
| 2011 | 57 | +14.0% |
| 2021 | 43 | −24.6% |
Source: Censuses
