= Drslavice (Prachatice District) =

- Municipality
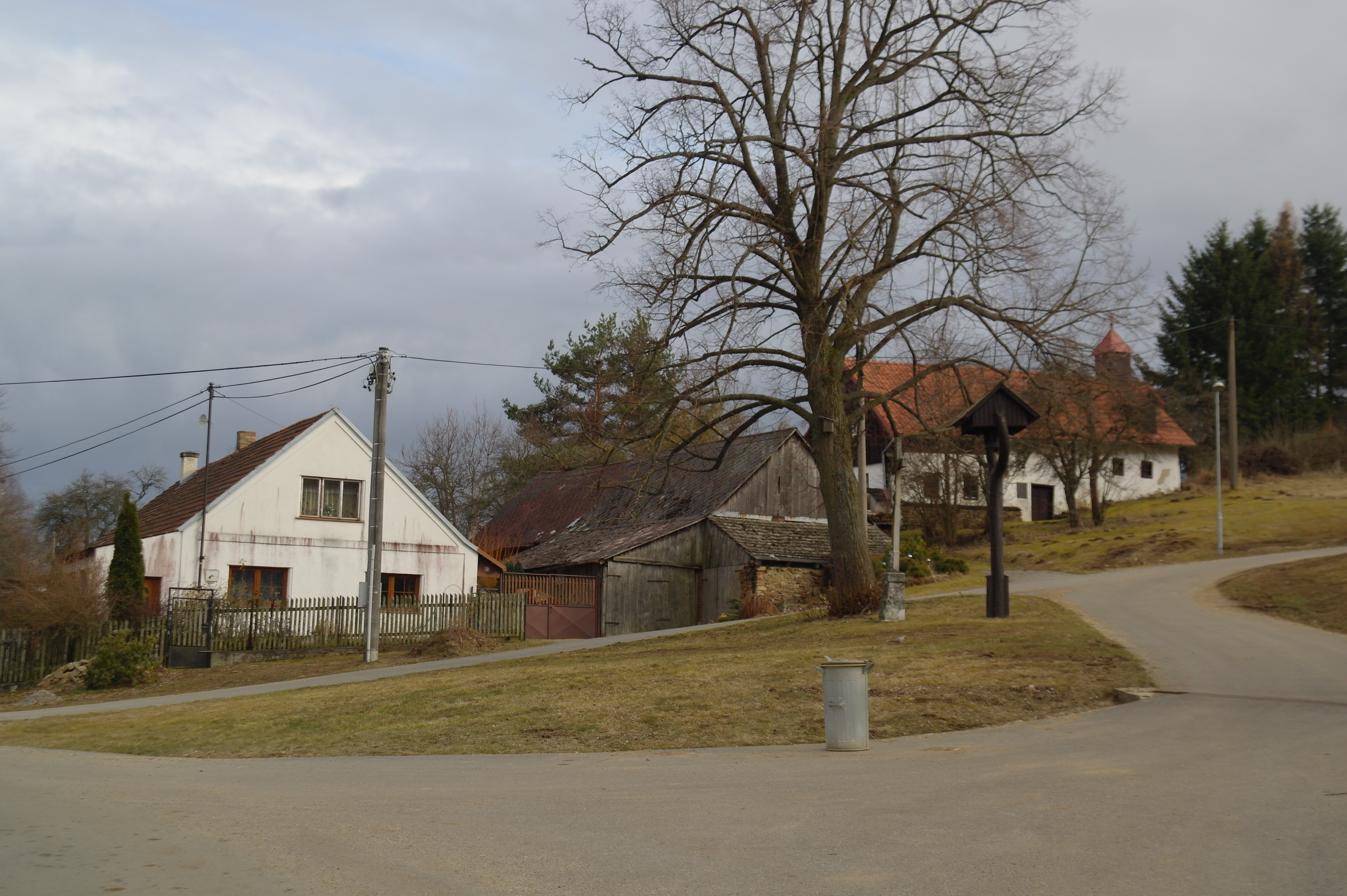
- Eastern part of Drslavice

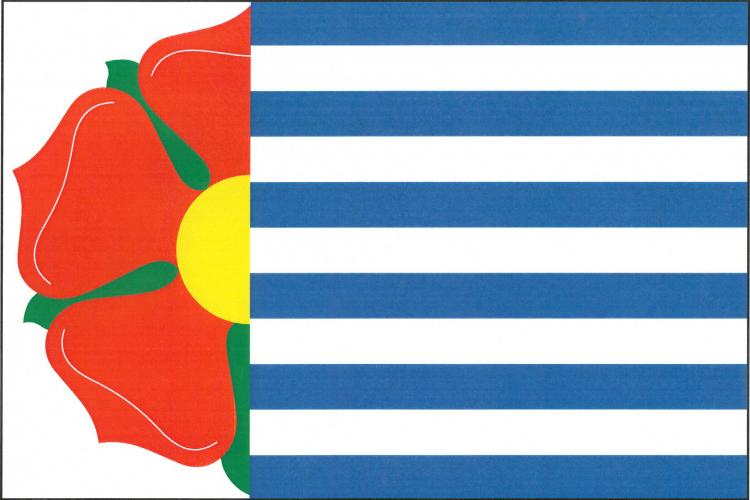
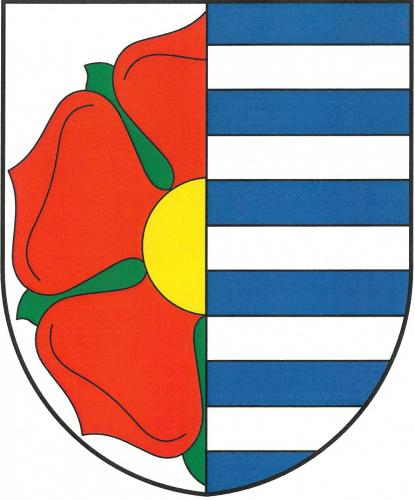
- Flag Coat of arms

- Location in the Czech Republic
- Coordinates: 49°1′31″N 13°55′15″E
- Country: Czech Republic
- Region: South Bohemian
- District: Prachatice
- First mentioned: 1384

Area
  - Total: 4.75 km^{2} (1.83 sq mi)
- Elevation: 665 m (2,182 ft)

Population (2026-01-01)
  - Total: 90
  - Density: 19/km^{2} (49/sq mi)
- Time zone: UTC+1 (CET)
  - Summer (DST): UTC+2 (CEST)
- Postal code: 384 21
- Website: obecdrslavice.cz

Drslavice is a municipality and village in Prachatice District in the South Bohemian Region of the Czech Republic. It has about 90 inhabitants.

Drslavice lies approximately 7 kilometres (4 mi) west of Prachatice, 42 km (26 mi) west of České Budějovice, and 124 km (77 mi) south of Prague.

== Administrative division ==
Drslavice consists of five municipal parts (in brackets population according to the 2021 census):

- Drslavice (53)
- Chválov (12)
- Škarez 1.díl (4)
- Švihov (24)
- Trpín (4)

== Demographics ==
Historical population
Year	Pop.	±%
1869	415	—
1880	422	+1.7%
1890	369	−12.6%
1900	338	−8.4%
1910	350	+3.6%
1921	356	+1.7%
1930	307	−13.8%
1950	201	−34.5%
1961	185	−8.0%
1970	136	−26.5%
1980	110	−19.1%
1991	80	−27.3%
2001	64	−20.0%
2011	91	+42.2%
2021	97	+6.6%
Source: Censuses
