= Třemošná (river) =

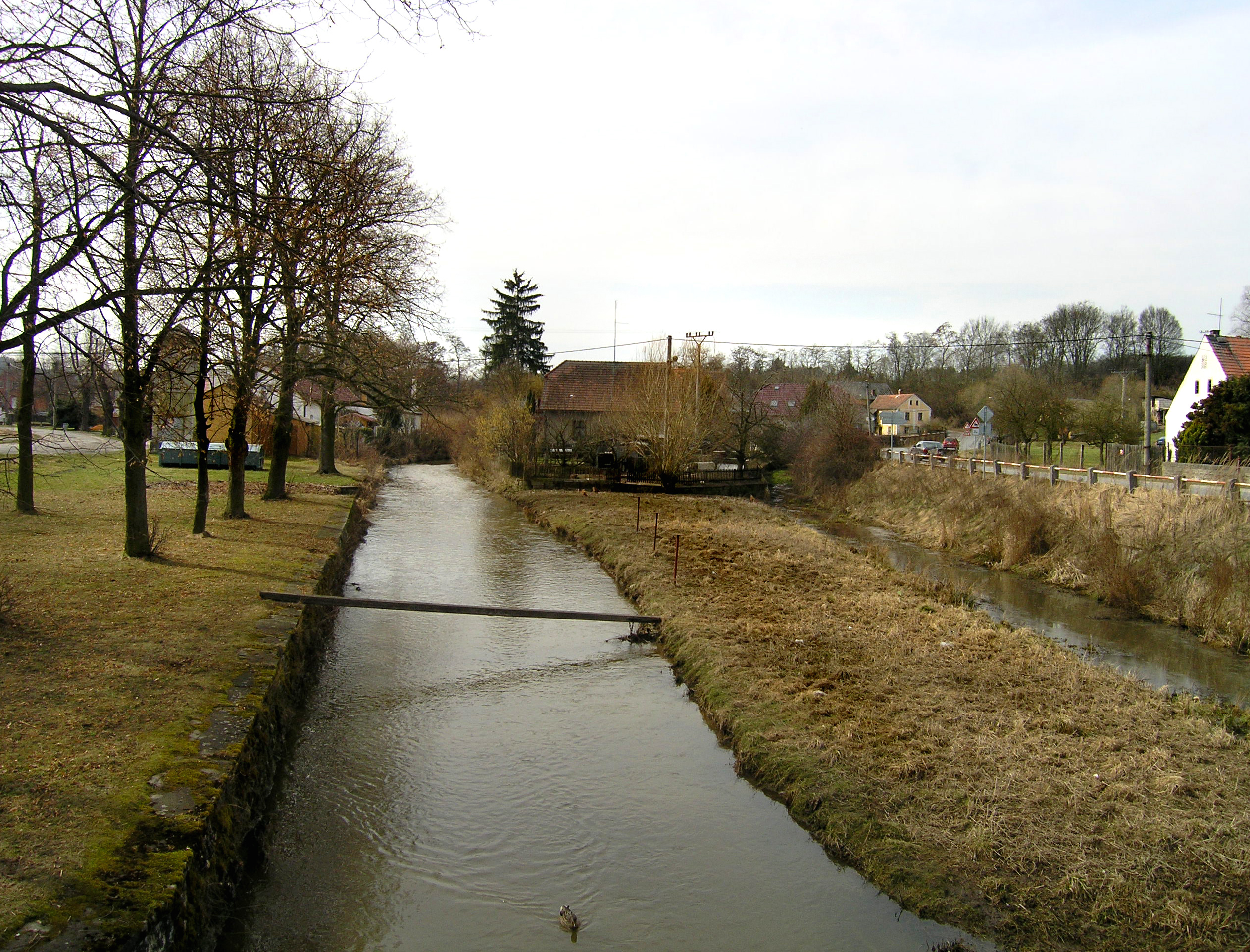
- The Třemošná in Ledce

Location
- Country: Czech Republic
- Region: Plzeň

Physical characteristics
- Source
  - location: Krsy, Rakovník Uplands
  - coordinates: 49°55′44″N 13°7′6″E
  - elevation: 600 m (2,000 ft)
- Mouth
  - location: Berounka
  - coordinates: 49°48′41″N 13°29′54″E
  - elevation: 278 m (912 ft)
- Length: 43.7 km (27.2 mi)
- Basin size: 249.2 km^{2} (96.2 sq mi)
- Discharge
  - average: 0.62 m^{3}/s (22 cu ft/s) near estuary

Basin features
- Progression: Berounka→ Vltava→ Elbe→ North Sea

The Třemošná is a river in the Czech Republic, a left tributary of the Berounka River. It flows through the Plzeň Region. It is 43.7 km (27.2 mi) long.

== Etymology ==
The name Třemošná evolved from the word střemcha, i.e. 'bird cherry'.

== Characteristic ==
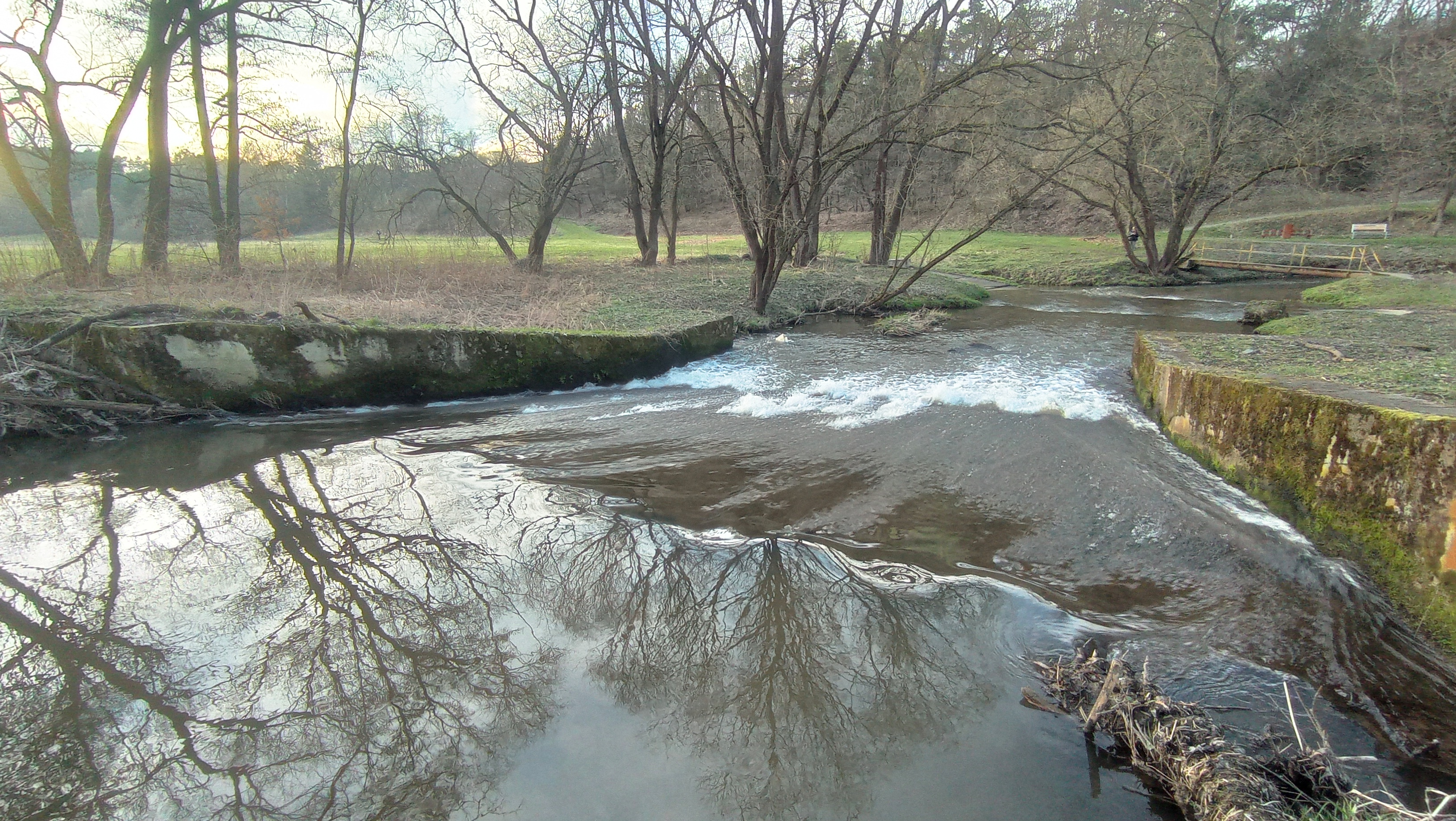
The Třemošná in Hromnice

The Třemošná originates in the territory of Krsy in the Rakovník Uplands at an elevation of 600 m (2,000 ft) and flows to Kaceřov, where it enters the Berounka River at an elevation of 278 m (912 ft). It is 43.7 km (27.2 mi) long. Its drainage basin has an area of 249.2 km^{2} (96.2 sq mi). The average discharge at its mouth is 0.62 m^{3}/s (22 cu ft/s).

The longest tributaries of the Třemošná are:

Tributary	Length (km)	Side
Bělá	21.1	left
Zlatý potok	8.3	left
Nekmířský potok	8.0	left

== Course ==
The river flows through the municipal territories of Krsy, Úněšov, Všeruby, Nevřeň, Příšov, Ledce, Třemošná, Česká Bříza, Hromnice, Jarov and Kaceřov.

== Bodies of water ==
There are 180 bodies of water in the basin area. The largest of them is the fishpond Hamr with an area of 13.4 ha (33 acres), supplied by the Bělá. A system of several small fishponds is built on the upper course of the Třemošná.

== See also ==
- List of rivers of the Czech Republic
