= Krsy =

- Municipality
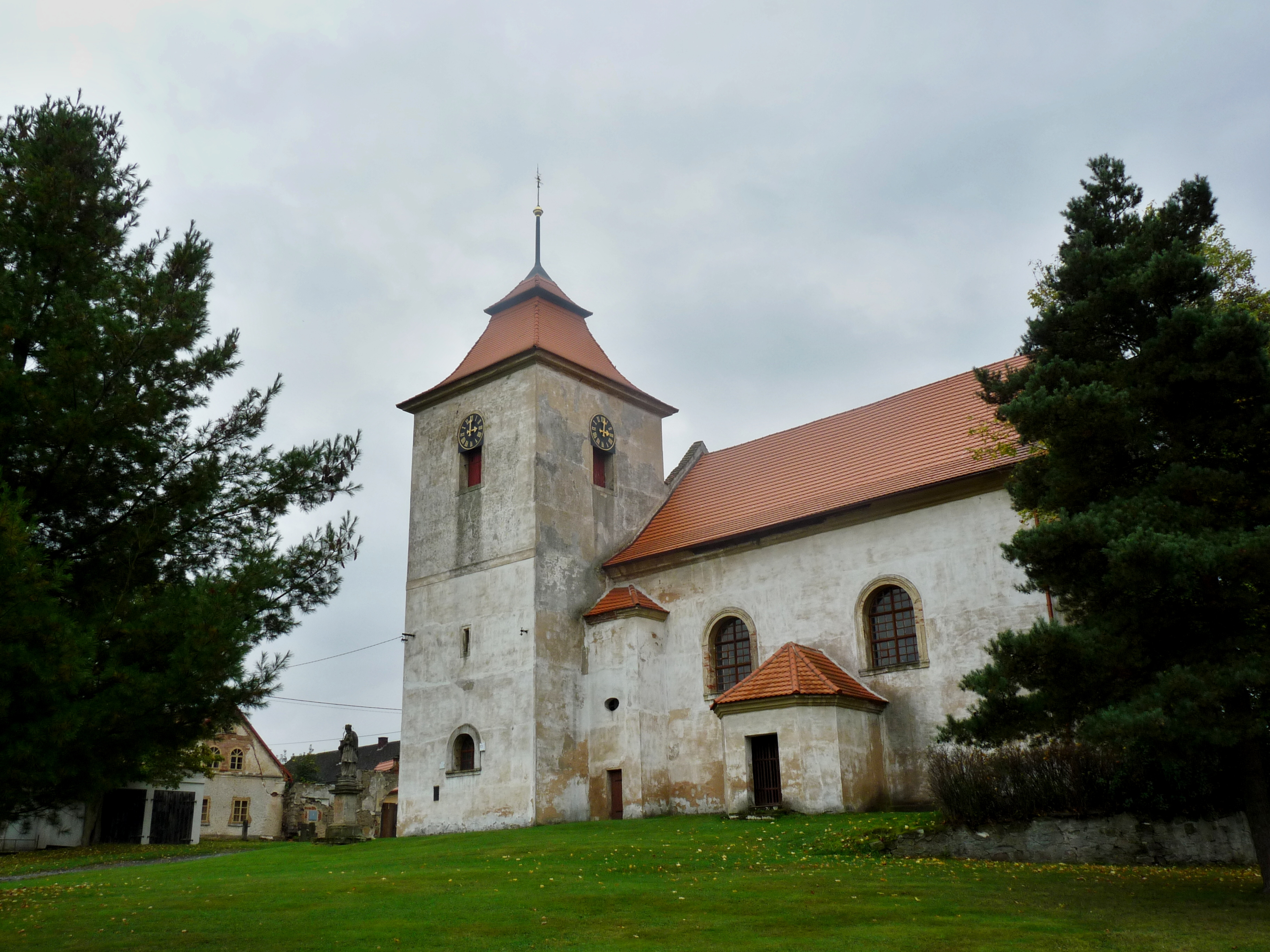
- Church of Saint Lawrence

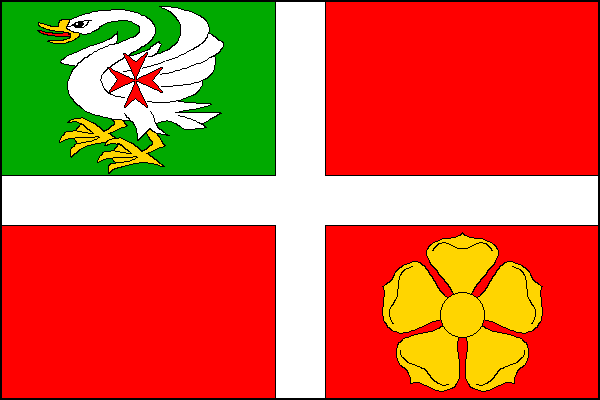
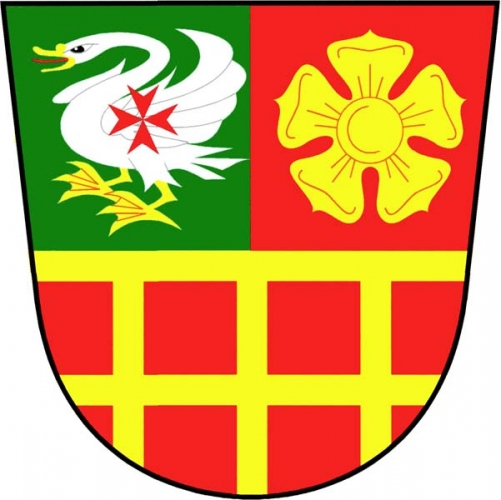
- Flag Coat of arms

- Location in the Czech Republic
- Coordinates: 49°55′35″N 13°3′18″E
- Country: Czech Republic
- Region: Plzeň
- District: Plzeň-North
- First mentioned: 1183

Area
  - Total: 25.72 km^{2} (9.93 sq mi)
- Elevation: 583 m (1,913 ft)

Population (2026-01-01)
  - Total: 264
  - Density: 10.3/km^{2} (26.6/sq mi)
- Time zone: UTC+1 (CET)
  - Summer (DST): UTC+2 (CEST)
- Postal codes: 330 38, 331 62
- Website: www.krsy.cz

Krsy (German: Girsch) is a municipality and village in Plzeň-North District in the Plzeň Region of the Czech Republic. It has about 300 inhabitants.

Krsy lies approximately 31 kilometres (19 mi) north-west of Plzeň and 100 km (62 mi) west of Prague. The Třemošná River originates in the municipality.

== Administrative division ==
Krsy consists of five municipal parts (in brackets population according to the 2021 census):

- Krsy (146)
- Kejšovice (12)
- Polínka (61)
- Skelná Huť (31)
- Trhomné (17)

== Demographics ==
Historical population
Year	Pop.	±%
1869	1,506	—
1880	1,360	−9.7%
1890	1,366	+0.4%
1900	1,322	−3.2%
1910	1,243	−6.0%
1921	1,171	−5.8%
1930	1,156	−1.3%
1950	482	−58.3%
1961	436	−9.5%
1970	352	−19.3%
1980	254	−27.8%
1991	197	−22.4%
2001	217	+10.2%
2011	202	−6.9%
2021	267	+32.2%
Source: Censuses
