= Úněšov =

- Municipality
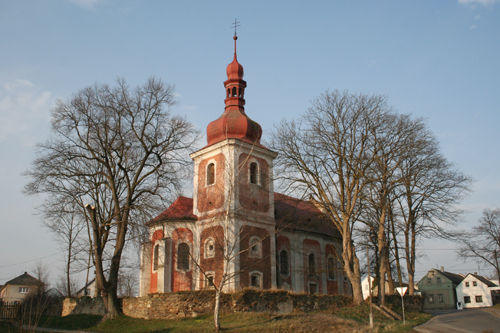
- Church of Saint Procopius

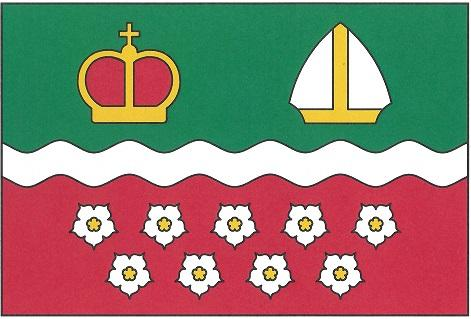
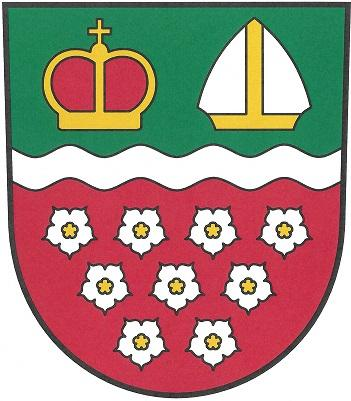
- Flag Coat of arms

- Location in the Czech Republic
- Coordinates: 49°52′58″N 13°8′57″E
- Country: Czech Republic
- Region: Plzeň
- District: Plzeň-North
- First mentioned: 1352

Area
  - Total: 38.68 km^{2} (14.93 sq mi)
- Elevation: 527 m (1,729 ft)

Population (2026-01-01)
  - Total: 624
  - Density: 16.1/km^{2} (41.8/sq mi)
- Time zone: UTC+1 (CET)
  - Summer (DST): UTC+2 (CEST)
- Postal codes: 330 35, 330 36, 330 38
- Website: www.unesov.cz

Úněšov (German: Anischau) is a municipality and village in Plzeň-North District in the Plzeň Region of the Czech Republic. It has about 600 inhabitants.

== Administrative division ==
Úněšov consists of nine municipal parts (in brackets population according to the 2021 census):

- Úněšov (317)
- Budeč (21)
- Čbán (38)
- Číhaná (119)
- Hvožďany (37)
- Lípa (12)
- Podmokly (24)
- Štipoklasy (17)
- Vojtěšín (20)

== Etymology ==
The name is derived from the personal name Uněš (a shortened form of Uněslav), meaning "Uněš's (court)".

== Geography ==
Úněšov is located about 22 kilometres (14 mi) northwest of Plzeň. It lies mostly in the Plasy Uplands, only the northern part of the municipal territory extends into the Rakovník Uplands. The highest point is the hill Lišák at 677 m (2,221 ft) above sea level. The upper course of the Třemošná River flows through the municipality and supplies there a system of several small fishponds.

== History ==
The first written mention of Úněšov is from 1352. The village was owned by various lesser noblemen. From 1556, Úněšov belonged to the Bělá estate.

== Demographics ==
Historical population

Year	Pop.	±%
1869	1,372	—
1880	1,308	−4.7%
1890	1,282	−2.0%
1900	1,238	−3.4%
1910	1,277	+3.2%

Year	Pop.	±%
1921	1,267	−0.8%
1930	1,244	−1.8%
1950	646	−48.1%
1961	620	−4.0%
1970	561	−9.5%

Year	Pop.	±%
1980	579	+3.2%
1991	563	−2.8%
2001	541	−3.9%
2011	547	+1.1%
2021	605	+10.6%

Source: Censuses

== Transport ==
The I/20 road (part of the European route E49) from Plzeň to Karlovy Vary runs through the municipality.

== Sights ==
The main landmark of Úněšov is the Church of Saint Procopius. It was originally a Gothic church from the 14th century, rebuilt in the Baroque style in 1738–1739.

The Church of Saint Wenceslaus is located in Číhaná. It was built in the first half of the 18th century, on the site of an older church.
