= Václav Brožík =

Czech painter and graphic artist

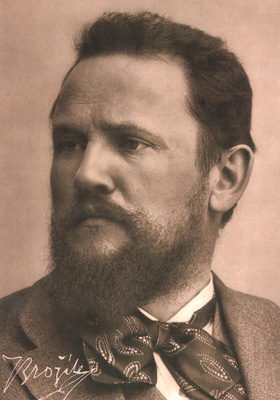
- Václav Brožík
- Born: 6 March 1851; Třemošná, Bohemia, Austrian Empire
- Died: 15 April 1901 (aged 50); Paris, France
- Education: Academy of Fine Arts in Prague
- Known for: Painting
- Notable work: Jan Hus before the Council of Constance (1883); Tu Felix Austria Nube (1886)
- Movement: Academicism
- Spouse: Hermine Sedelmayer
- Awards: Gold medal winner at the Salon (1878); Legion of Honour (1884); Ennobled by Emperor Franz Joseph I (1887)
- Elected: Institut de France (1896)

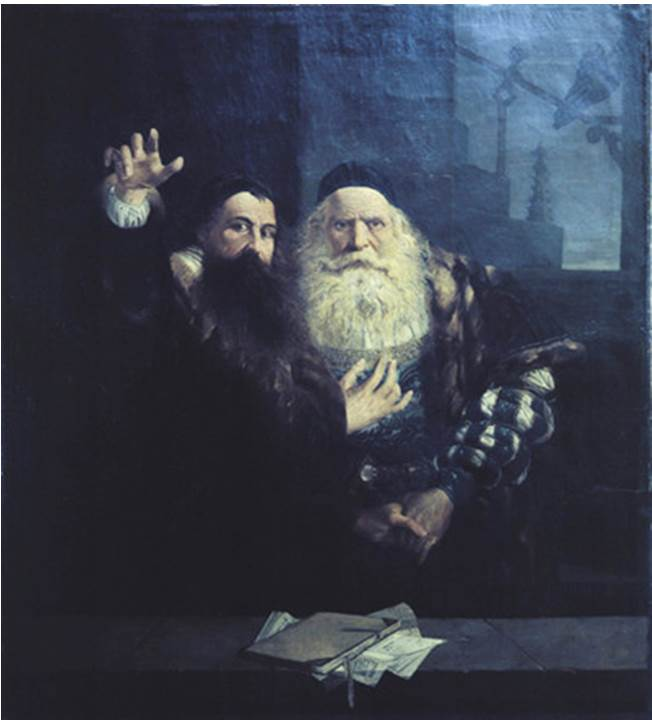
Comenius says goodbye to Karel the Elder of Zierotin (1873)

Václav Brožík (pronounced [vɑ:tslaf br̩oʒiːk]; 6 March 1851 – 15 April 1901) was a Czech painter who worked in the academic style.

== Life ==
Brožík was born on 6 March 1851 in Třemošná, Bohemia, Austrian Empire (now the Czech Republic). He came from a poor family, studying lithography and porcelain painting through apprenticeships. Beginning in 1868, with financial assistance from a local landowner, he was able to attend the Academy of Fine Arts in Prague. He made a trip to the Netherlands, where he studied the Old Masters, then settled in Paris (despite not being able to speak French), where a letter of recommendation assured him the support of Jaroslav Čermák. In 1879 he married Hermina Sedelmeyer, daughter of the wealthy Parisian art dealer Charles Sedelmeyer. For most of his life, he divided his time between Paris and Prague, where he became a Professor at the Art Academy in 1893.

He was named a member of the Institut de France, partly through the influence of his father-in-law, who also suggested that he do a painting on the theme "Tu Felix Austria Nube" (from an old saying: "Let others wage war: thou, happy Austria, marry"). The result pleased Emperor Franz Joseph I, who was involved in an unhappy marriage. As a result, Brožík was elevated to the nobility.

He also became a member of the Académie des Beaux-Arts, received the Grand Cross of the Légion d'Honneur and was appointed to the Czech Academy of Arts and Sciences. One of his 1884 paintings, showing Columbus soliciting the aid of Queen Isabella, appeared on a United States postage stamp in 1893.

His health began to decline in 1894, but he threw himself into painting even more diligently. He died suddenly of heart failure on 15 April 1901 in Paris and was buried in Montmartre. Appreciation of his work suffered a serious decline after his death, as it was considered old-fashioned, but a major retrospective in 2003 has created some renewed interest.
