= Vejprnice =

- Municipality
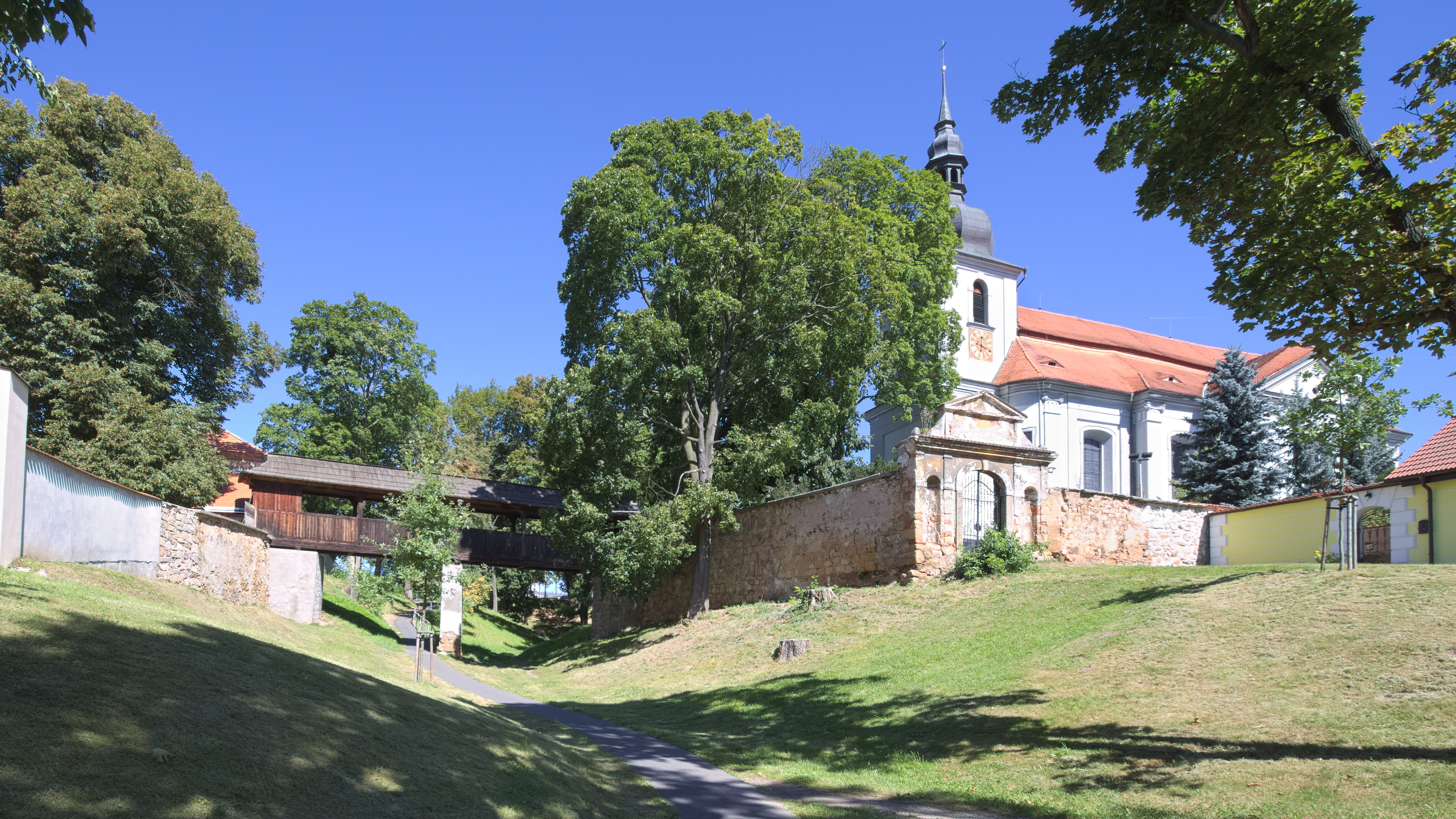
- Church of Saint Adalbert

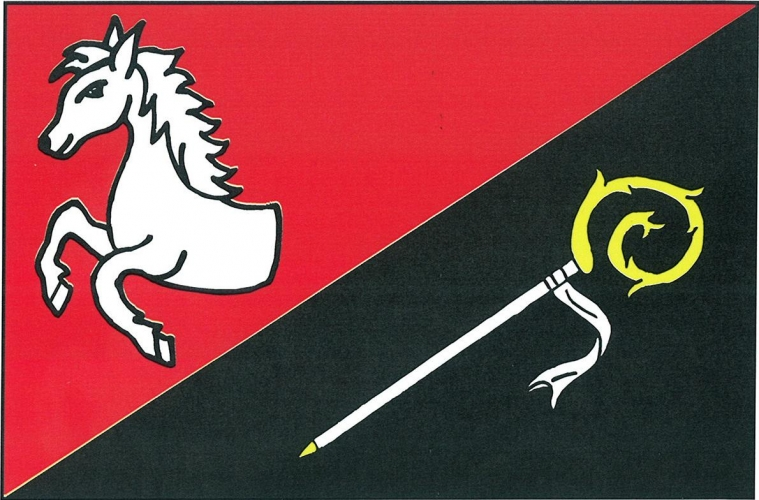
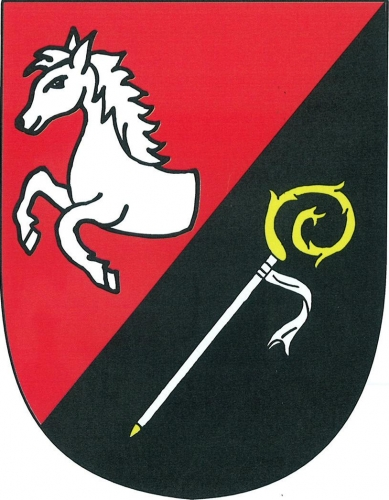
- Flag Coat of arms

- Location in the Czech Republic
- Coordinates: 49°43′47″N 13°16′35″E
- Country: Czech Republic
- Region: Plzeň
- District: Plzeň-North
- First mentioned: 993

Government
  - Mayor: Pavel Karpíšek (ODS)

Area
  - Total: 10.28 km^{2} (3.97 sq mi)
- Elevation: 325 m (1,066 ft)

Population (2026-01-01)
  - Total: 4,665
  - Density: 453.8/km^{2} (1,175/sq mi)
- Time zone: UTC+1 (CET)
  - Summer (DST): UTC+2 (CEST)
- Postal code: 330 27
- Website: www.vejprnice.cz

Vejprnice (Czech pronunciation: [ˈvɛjpr̩ɲɪtsɛ]) is a municipality and village in Plzeň-North District in the Plzeň Region of the Czech Republic. It has about 4,700 inhabitants.

== Etymology ==
The initial name of the settlement was Ojprnice. There is a theory that the name was derived from the personal name Ojprn/Ojprna, but the existence of such a name has not been proven and probably has a basis in a foreign language. Until the 16th century, the settlement's name was also spelled as Oprnice, Ejprnice and Eprnice. The form Vejprnice was first used in 1523.

== Geography ==
Vejprnice is located about 7 kilometres (4 mi) west of Plzeň. It lies in the Plasy Uplands, in a relatively flat landscape. The stream Vejprnický potok flows through the municipality.

== History ==
The first written mention of Vejprnice is in the foundation deed of the Břevnov Monastery from 993. A fortress in Vejprnice was first documented in 1318. Thanks to its proximity to Plzeň, the municipality experienced rapid development in recent decades.

== Demographics ==
Historical population

Year	Pop.	±%
1869	647	—
1880	787	+21.6%
1890	1,165	+48.0%
1900	1,606	+37.9%
1910	1,888	+17.6%

Year	Pop.	±%
1921	2,006	+6.2%
1930	2,127	+6.0%
1950	1,924	−9.5%
1961	2,964	+54.1%
1970	2,757	−7.0%

Year	Pop.	±%
1980	2,611	−5.3%
1991	2,400	−8.1%
2001	2,520	+5.0%
2011	3,910	+55.2%
2021	4,479	+14.6%

Source: Censuses

== Transport ==
Vejprnice is located on the railway line Plzeň–Domažlice.

== Sights ==
The main landmark of Vejprnice is the Church of Saint Adalbert. The current church was built in 1722–1723 and was designed by architect František Maxmilián Kaňka or his disciple František Ignác Preé.

== Notable people ==
- Jakub Husník (1837–1916), painter, art teacher and inventor
