= Všeruby (Plzeň-North District) =

- Town
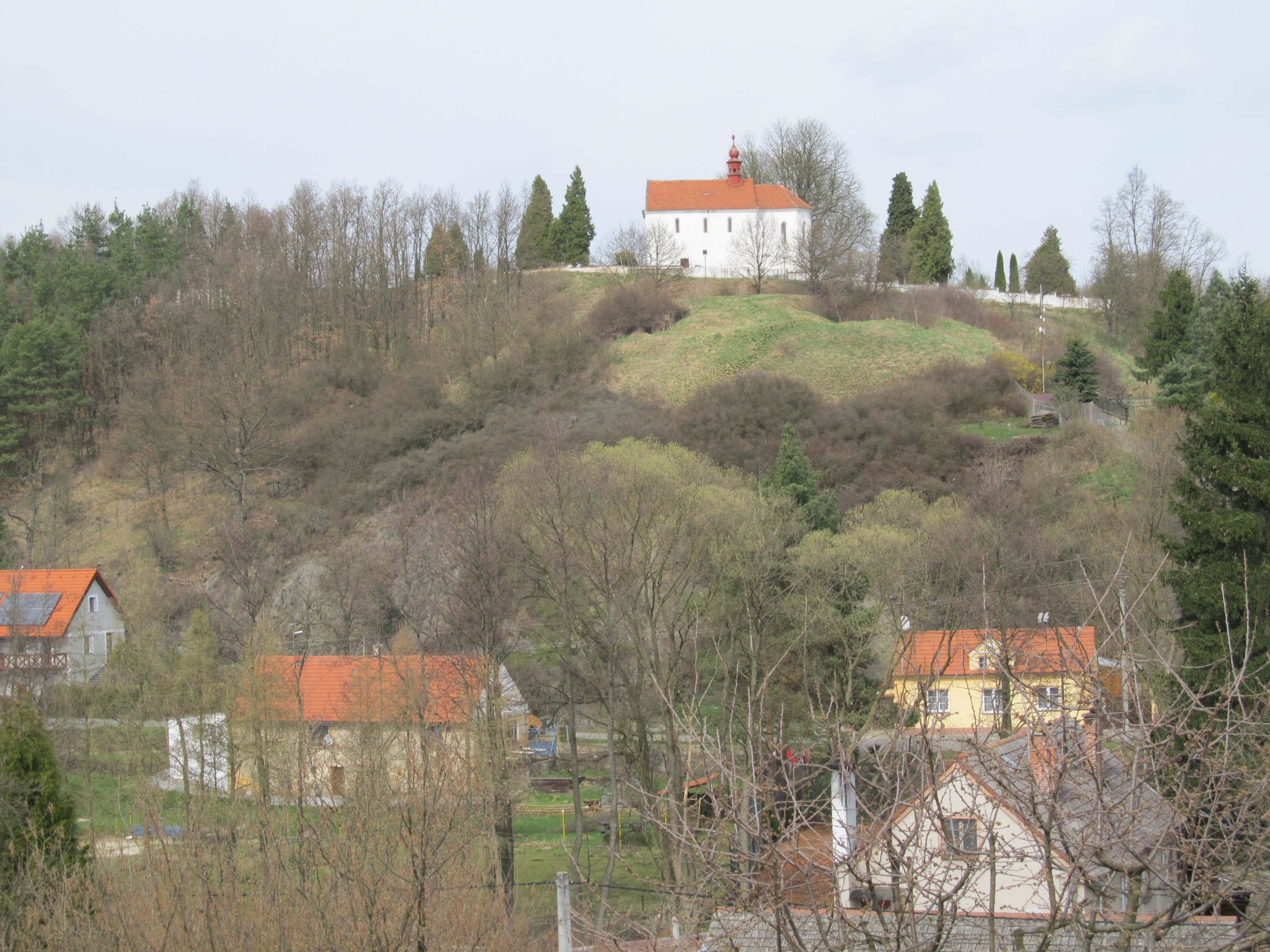
- Church of Saint Martin on the hill

- Flag Coat of arms

- Location in the Czech Republic
- Coordinates: 49°50′30″N 13°13′46″E
- Country: Czech Republic
- Region: Plzeň
- District: Plzeň-North
- First mentioned: 1212

Government
  - Mayor: Václav Červenka

Area
  - Total: 23.57 km^{2} (9.10 sq mi)
- Elevation: 424 m (1,391 ft)

Population (2026-01-01)
  - Total: 1,746
  - Density: 74.08/km^{2} (191.9/sq mi)
- Time zone: UTC+1 (CET)
  - Summer (DST): UTC+2 (CEST)
- Postal codes: 330 11, 330 16, 330 35
- Website: www.vseruby-mesto.cz

Všeruby (Czech pronunciation: [ˈfʃɛrubɪ]; German: Wscherau) is a town in Plzeň-North District in the Plzeň Region of the Czech Republic. It has about 1,700 inhabitants. The town is located on the Třemošná River in the Plasy Uplands.

== Administrative division ==
Všeruby consists of seven municipal parts (in brackets population according to the 2021 census):

- Všeruby (1,286)
- Chrančovice (119)
- Chrástov (9)
- Klenovice (73)
- Kokořov (54)
- Popovice (24)
- Radimovice (50)

== Etymology ==
The name Všeruby is probably derived from the Czech words vše ('all') and rubati ('to chop'). That would mean it was a village of lumberjacks. However, in the oldest documents the name is written as Všeroby. Either this is a typo, or the root of the name is actually the word roba, which in Old Czech meant 'servant' or 'prostitute'.

== Geography ==
Všeruby is located about 15 kilometres (9 mi) northwest of Plzeň. It lies in the Plasy Uplands. The highest point is at 540 m (1,772 ft) above sea level. The Třemošná River flows through the town.

== History ==
The first written mention of Všeruby is from 1212. Until 1945, most of the inhabitants were ethnic Germans. In 1945, the German-speaking population was expelled.

== Demographics ==
Historical population

Year	Pop.	±%
1869	2,179	—
1880	2,144	−1.6%
1890	2,140	−0.2%
1900	2,124	−0.7%
1910	2,053	−3.3%

Year	Pop.	±%
1921	1,892	−7.8%
1930	1,971	+4.2%
1950	952	−51.7%
1961	1,041	+9.3%
1970	858	−17.6%

Year	Pop.	±%
1980	957	+11.5%
1991	956	−0.1%
2001	986	+3.1%
2011	1,227	+24.4%
2021	1,615	+31.6%

Source: Censuses

== Transport ==
The I/20 road (part of the European route E49) from Plzeň to Karlovy Vary runs through the municipal territory.

== Sights ==
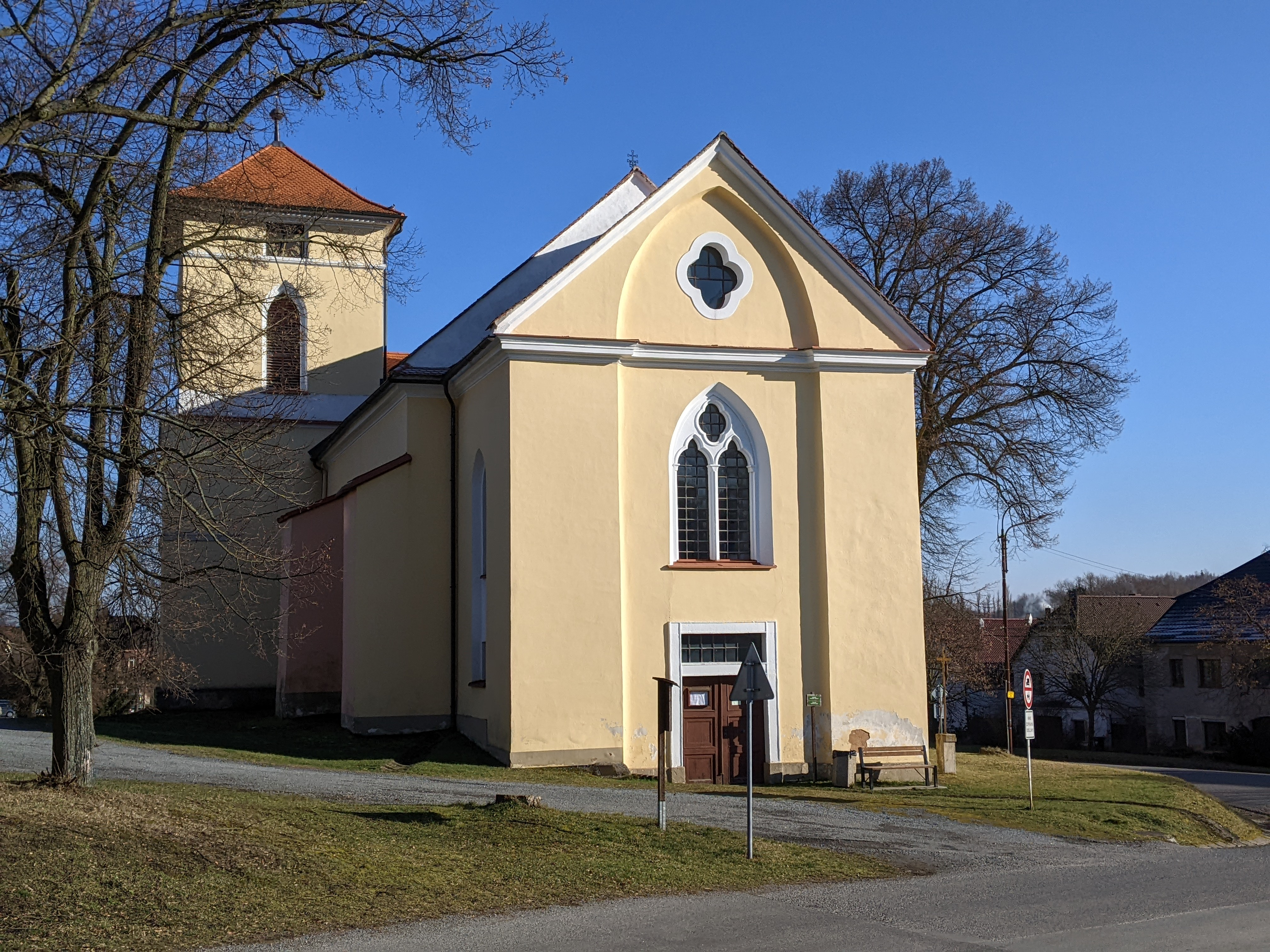
Church of the Holy Spirit

The main landmark of the town centre is the Church of the Holy Spirit. Originally a Gothic church from the second half of the 14th century, it was rebuilt in the Renaissance style in the second half of the 16th century.

The Church of Saint Martin is located in the area of the former gord. It is a Romanesque church from the second half of the 12th century. The chancel was added in the Gothic-Renaissance period and rebuilt in 1684.

The Chapel of Saint John of Nepomuk is a valuable small Baroque building. It dates from around 1760.

== Notable people ==
- Carola Braunbock (1924–1978), German actress
- Franz Metzner (1870–1919), German sculptor
