= Třemošná =

- Town
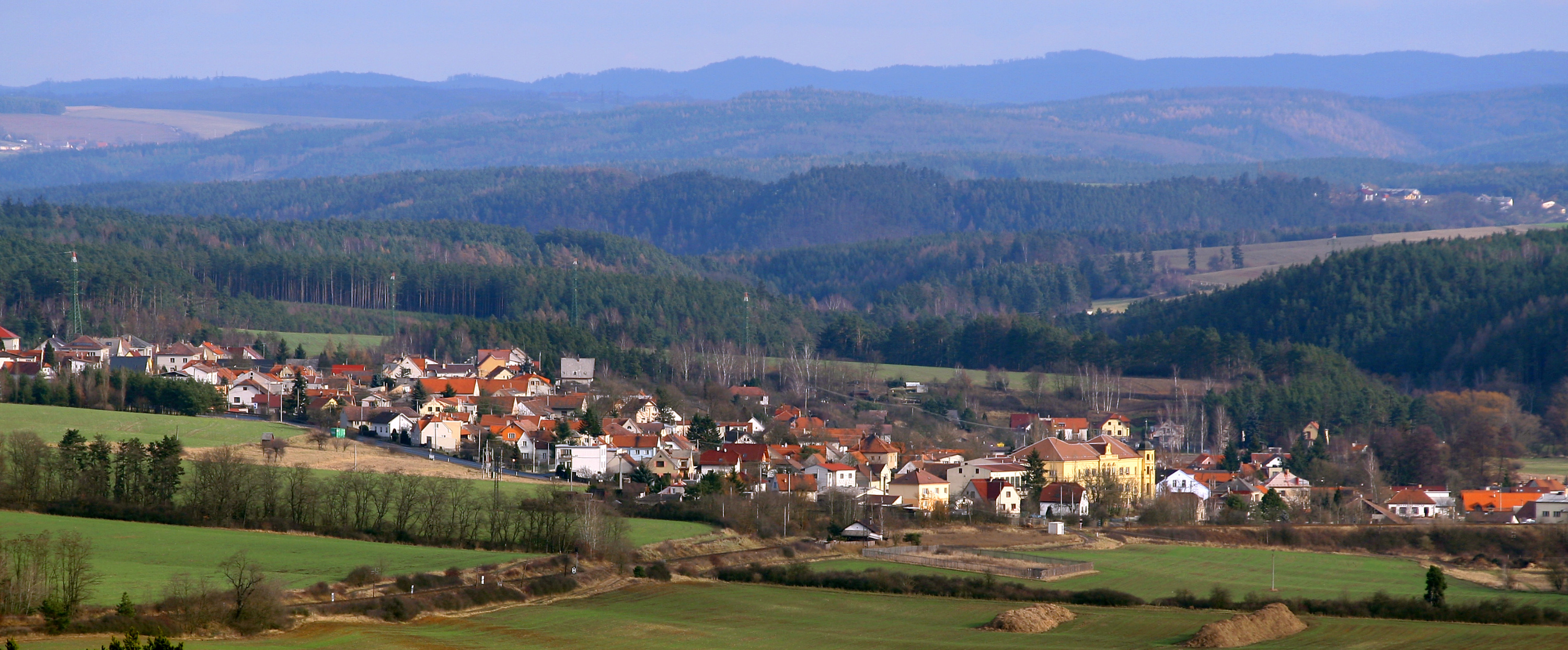
- Northern part of Třemošná

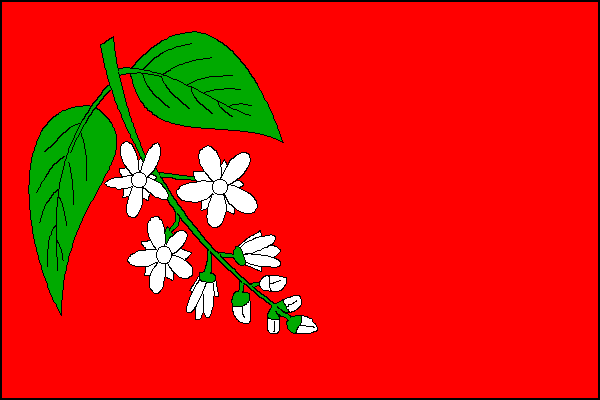
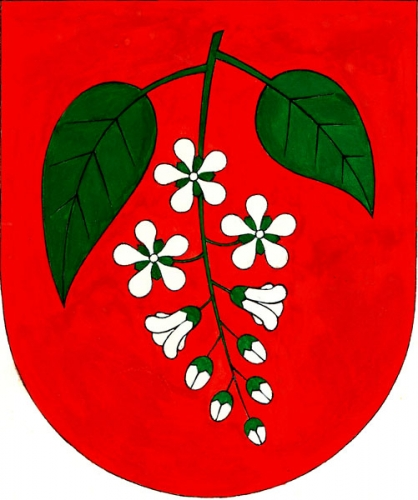
- Flag Coat of arms

- Location in the Czech Republic
- Coordinates: 49°48′57″N 13°23′42″E
- Country: Czech Republic
- Region: Plzeň
- District: Plzeň-North
- First mentioned: 1181

Government
  - Mayor: Jaromír Zeithaml

Area
  - Total: 18.12 km^{2} (7.00 sq mi)
- Elevation: 348 m (1,142 ft)

Population (2026-01-01)
  - Total: 5,112
  - Density: 282.1/km^{2} (730.7/sq mi)
- Time zone: UTC+1 (CET)
  - Summer (DST): UTC+2 (CEST)
- Postal code: 330 11
- Website: www.tremosna.cz

Třemošná (Czech pronunciation: [ˈtr̝̊ɛmoʃnaː]; German: Tschemoschna) is a town in Plzeň-North District in the Plzeň Region of the Czech Republic. It has about 5,100 inhabitants. The town is located on the Třemošná River in the Plasy Uplands.

Třemošná was founded in the 12th century at the latest, but it became a town only in 1972.

== Administrative division ==
Třemošná consists of two municipal parts (in brackets population according to the 2021 census):

- Třemošná (4,268)
- Záluží (830)

== Etymology ==
The name Třemošná evolved from the Czech word střemcha, i.e. 'bird cherry'.

== Geography ==
Třemošná is located about 5 kilometres (3 mi) west of Plzeň. It lies in the Plasy Uplands. The highest point is at 465 m (1,526 ft) above sea level. The Třemošná River flows through the town. The Bělá Stream joins the Třemošná in the western part of the municipal territory.

== History ==
The first written mention of Třemošná is from 1181. The village changed owners very often. Among the owners in the 13th–15th centuries were the chapter in Mělník, the monastery in Plasy, and various lesser noblemen. In 1509, Třemošná was acquired by Albrecht of Kolowrat, and later it was bought by Jan and Bernard Waldstein. In the late 17th century, Třemošná became part of the Nekmíř estate and shared its owners and destinies.

From the beginning of the 19th century, the village began to gradually change its face thanks to the development of coal mining and industry. In 1862–1864, a glass factory was established here. Coal mining ended at the end of the 19th century. In 1961, the village of Záluží was joined to Třemošná. In 1972, Třemošná became a town.

== Demographics ==
Historical population

Year	Pop.	±%
1869	1,246	—
1880	1,751	+40.5%
1890	2,154	+23.0%
1900	2,726	+26.6%
1910	3,151	+15.6%

Year	Pop.	±%
1921	3,618	+14.8%
1930	4,315	+19.3%
1950	3,581	−17.0%
1961	3,917	+9.4%
1970	3,920	+0.1%

Year	Pop.	±%
1980	4,856	+23.9%
1991	4,646	−4.3%
2001	4,624	−0.5%
2011	4,878	+5.5%
2021	5,098	+4.5%

Source: Censuses

== Transport ==
Třemošná is located on the railway line heading from Plzeň to Plasy and Žihle.

== Sights ==
The most notable monuments in Třemošná are a pharmacy with an Art Nouveau façade from the beginning of the 20th century and a Neoclassical chapel from the mid-19th century.

== Notable people ==
- Václav Brožík (1851–1901), painter
