= Jakub Husník =

Czech photographer, painter and inventor

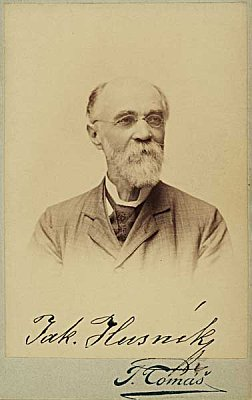
Jakub Husník. cca 1895 Photography: Jan Tomáš, Collection Scheufler

Jakub Husník (29 March 1837 in Vejprnice, near Plzeň – 26 March 1916 in Prague) was a Czech painter, art teacher and inventor of the improved photolithography method.

== Life ==
Husník was born on 29 March 1837, one of the ten children of the local forester. After the attending schools in Hlavatce and Benešov, he completed the Prager six-form high school. In 1853, he entered the local academy of fine arts, where he studied until 1859. There, he met Karel Klíč. He studied in Antwerp with professor Joseph Henri François van Lerius. After his return, he was active in the church of Uhrínevs. In 1863, he became a teacher at the High School in Tábor. In 1877, he was appointed as the art professor at the material High School. After one year, he also opened an independent workshop for lithography.

== Research ==
In the 1860s, Husník developed the collotype process. Together with professor Schwarz, he examined the "wet process" when developing photographs. He first discovered the "zweitonige photograph". In 1893, he perfected the three-colored reproduction for the printing and announced first patents.

== Works ==
Husník wrote specialized books concerning his inventions.

== Honours and memberships ==
In 1907, Husník became an honorary member of the photographic society in Vienna and Berlin.
