= Ledce (Plzeň-North District) =

- Municipality
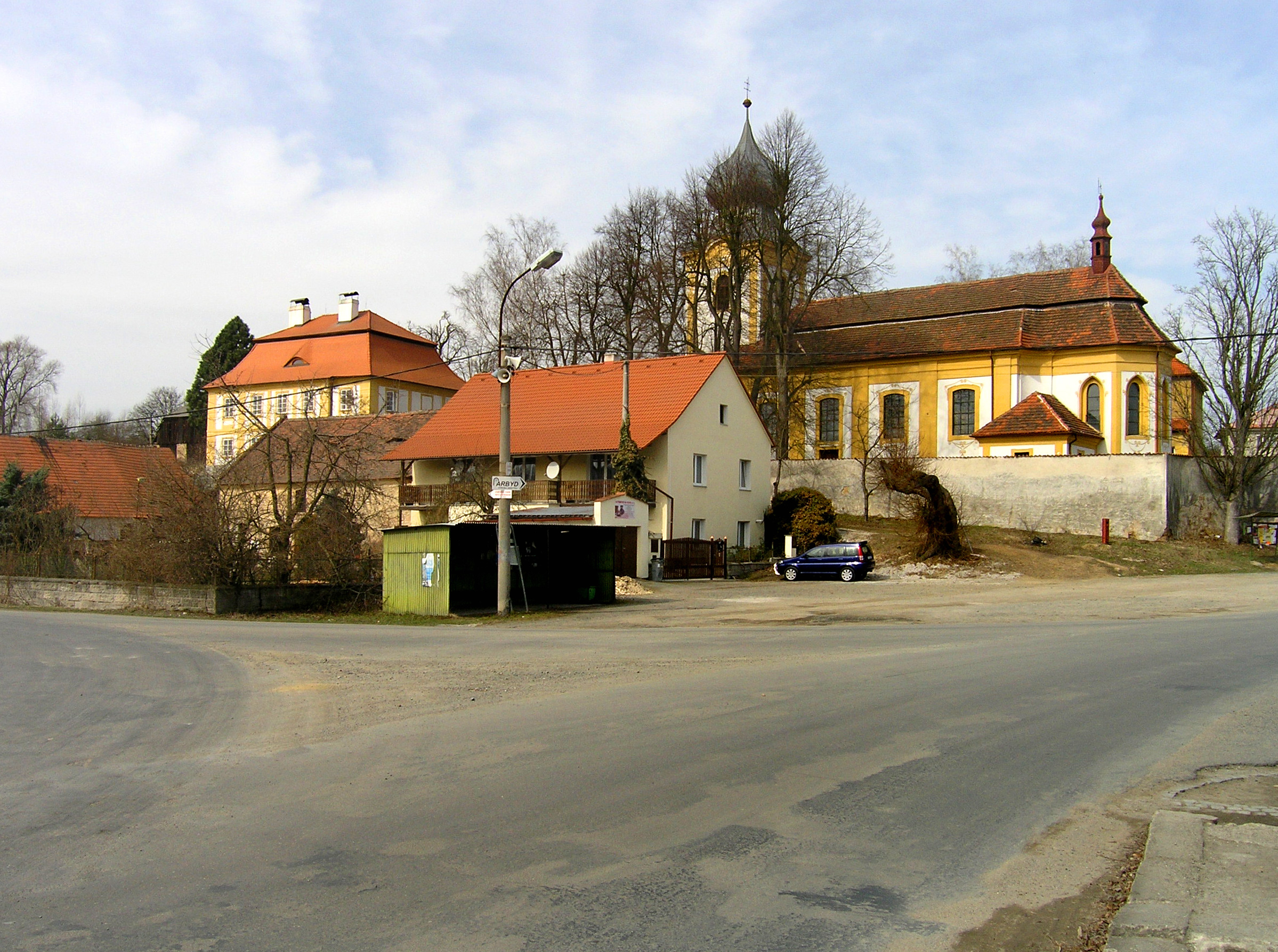
- Common in Ledce

- Location in the Czech Republic
- Coordinates: 49°49′18″N 13°19′43″E
- Country: Czech Republic
- Region: Plzeň
- District: Plzeň-North
- First mentioned: 1180

Area
  - Total: 9.36 km^{2} (3.61 sq mi)
- Elevation: 363 m (1,191 ft)

Population (2026-01-01)
  - Total: 935
  - Density: 99.9/km^{2} (259/sq mi)
- Time zone: UTC+1 (CET)
  - Summer (DST): UTC+2 (CEST)
- Postal code: 330 14
- Website: www.ledceps.cz

Ledce is a municipality and village in Plzeň-North District in the Plzeň Region of the Czech Republic. It has about 900 inhabitants.

Ledce lies approximately 9 kilometres (6 mi) north of Plzeň and 84 km (52 mi) west of Prague.

== Demographics ==
Historical population
Year	Pop.	±%
1869	483	—
1880	517	+7.0%
1890	565	+9.3%
1900	627	+11.0%
1910	730	+16.4%
1921	764	+4.7%
1930	878	+14.9%
1950	709	−19.2%
1961	744	+4.9%
1970	747	+0.4%
1980	661	−11.5%
1991	671	+1.5%
2001	671	+0.0%
2011	742	+10.6%
2021	851	+14.7%
Source: Censuses
