= Kaceřov (Plzeň-North District) =

- Municipality
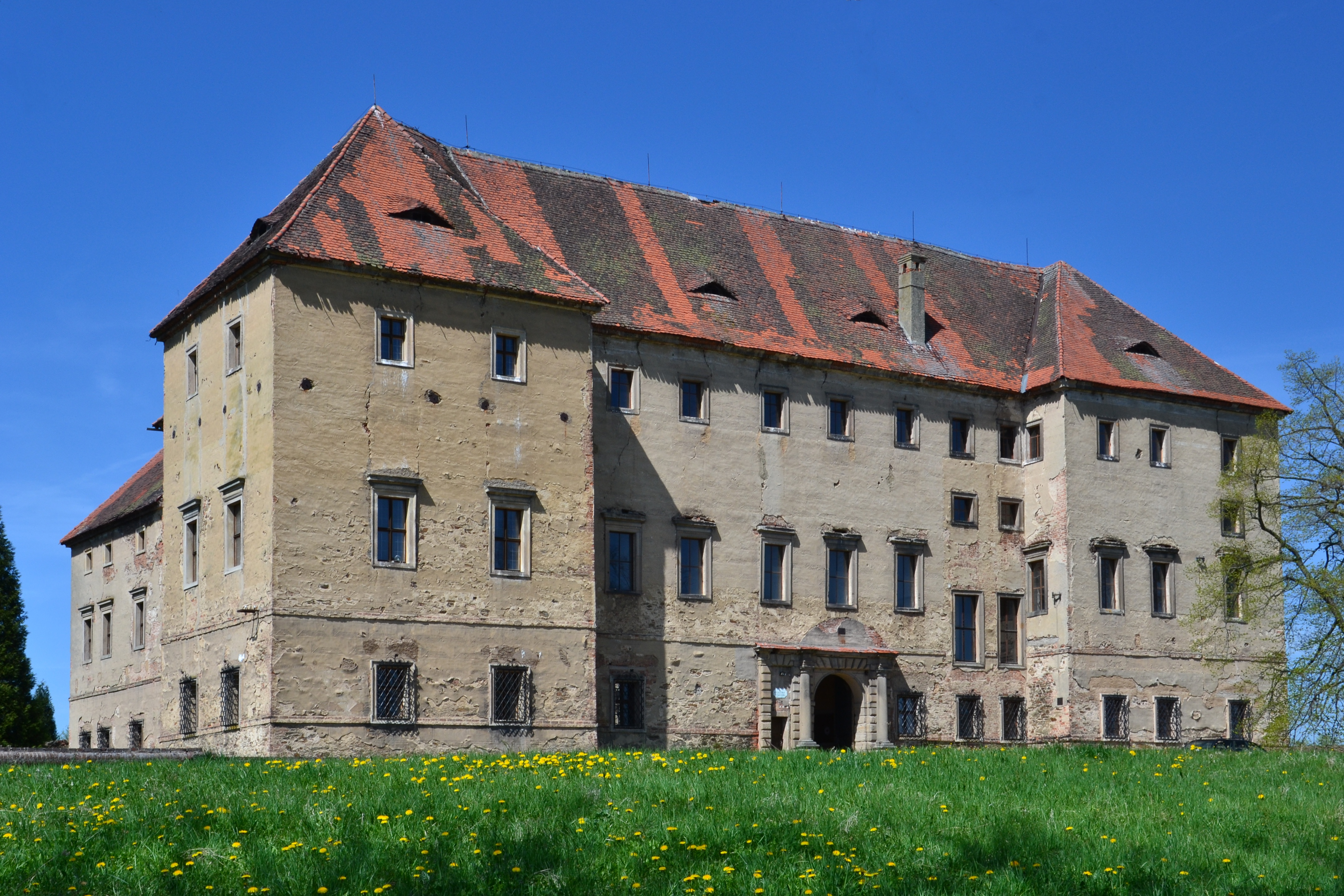
- Kaceřov Castle

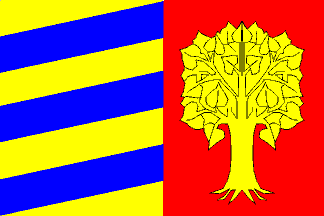
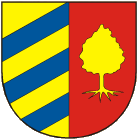
- Flag Coat of arms

- Location in the Czech Republic
- Coordinates: 49°52′15″N 13°30′46″E
- Country: Czech Republic
- Region: Plzeň
- District: Plzeň-North
- First mentioned: 1376

Area
  - Total: 4.27 km^{2} (1.65 sq mi)
- Elevation: 338 m (1,109 ft)

Population (2026-01-01)
  - Total: 163
  - Density: 38.2/km^{2} (98.9/sq mi)
- Time zone: UTC+1 (CET)
  - Summer (DST): UTC+2 (CEST)
- Postal code: 331 51
- Website: www.kacerov.eu

Kaceřov is a municipality and village in Plzeň-North District in the Plzeň Region of the Czech Republic. It has about 200 inhabitants.

Kaceřov lies approximately 17 kilometres (11 mi) north-east of Plzeň and 70 km (43 mi) west of Prague.

== Demographics ==
Historical population
Year	Pop.	±%
1869	213	—
1880	219	+2.8%
1890	178	−18.7%
1900	184	+3.4%
1910	187	+1.6%
1921	211	+12.8%
1930	209	−0.9%
1950	172	−17.7%
1961	153	−11.0%
1970	130	−15.0%
1980	134	+3.1%
1991	112	−16.4%
2001	115	+2.7%
2011	119	+3.5%
2021	151	+26.9%
Source: Censuses
