= Plzeň Region =

Region of the Czech Republic

Plzeň Region Plzeňský kraj
- Region
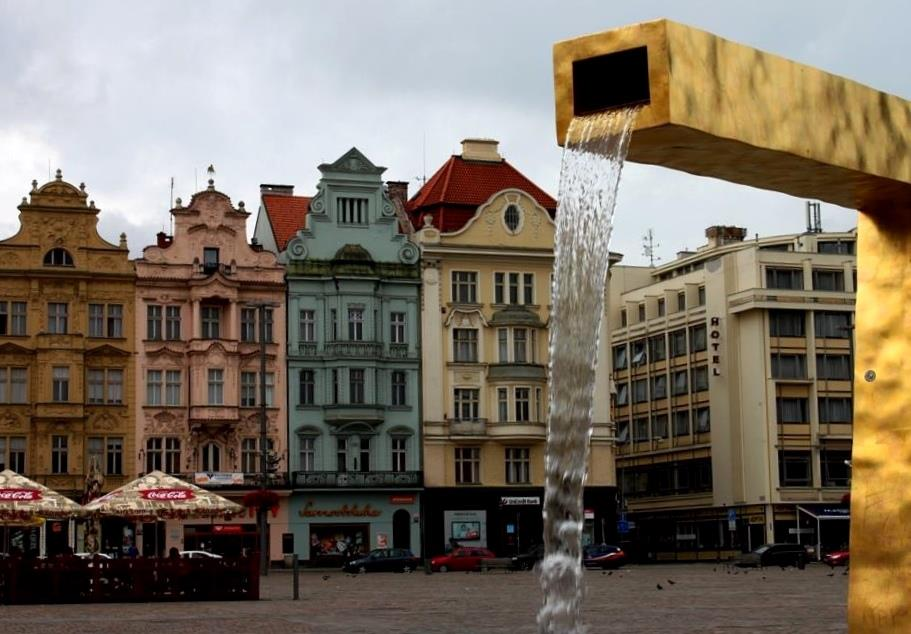
- Fountain on the Square of the Republic in Plzeň

- Flag Coat of arms

- Country: Czech Republic
- Capital: Plzeň
- Districts: Domažlice District, Klatovy District, Plzeň-City District, Plzeň-South District, Plzeň-North District, Rokycany District, Tachov District

Government
  - Governor: Kamal Farhan (ANO)

Area
  - Total: 7,561 km^{2} (2,919 sq mi)
- Highest elevation: 1,370 m (4,490 ft)

Population (2024-01-01)
  - Total: 613,374
  - Density: 81.12/km^{2} (210.1/sq mi)

GDP
  - Total: CZK 297.919 billion (€11.619 billion)
- ISO 3166 code: CZ-32
- Vehicle registration: P
- Website: www.kr-plzensky.cz

Plzeň Region or Plzeňský Region (also known as Pilsen Region; Czech: Plzeňský kraj) is an administrative unit (kraj) of the Czech Republic, located in the western part of the historical land of Bohemia and named after the capital, Plzeň. In terms of area, Plzeň Region is 7,561 km^{2} (2,919 sq mi), the third largest region in the Czech Republic. However, with a population of about 585,000 inhabitants it is the ninth most populous region. After the South Bohemian Region it is the second least densely populated region. The region can be roughly divided into two parts: a highly industrialized north-eastern part with a strong engineering tradition around Pilsen (Czech: Plzeň) and a more hilly and rural south-western part with smaller-sized manufacturing companies processing natural resources.

The region borders the Karlovy Vary Region (to the north-west), Ústí nad Labem Region (to the north), Central Bohemian Region (north-east), South Bohemian Region (to the east) and with Bavaria (part of Germany) in the south-west and west. The region was established based on the constitutional Act No. 347/97 of Collections concerning the formation of higher territorial administrative units. The region and its authorities are specified by Act No. 129/2000 of Collections concerning regions, which came into effect on the day of the regional authorities elections, or on 1 January 2001.

== Administrative divisions ==
The Plzeň Region is divided into 7 districts (Czech: okresy):

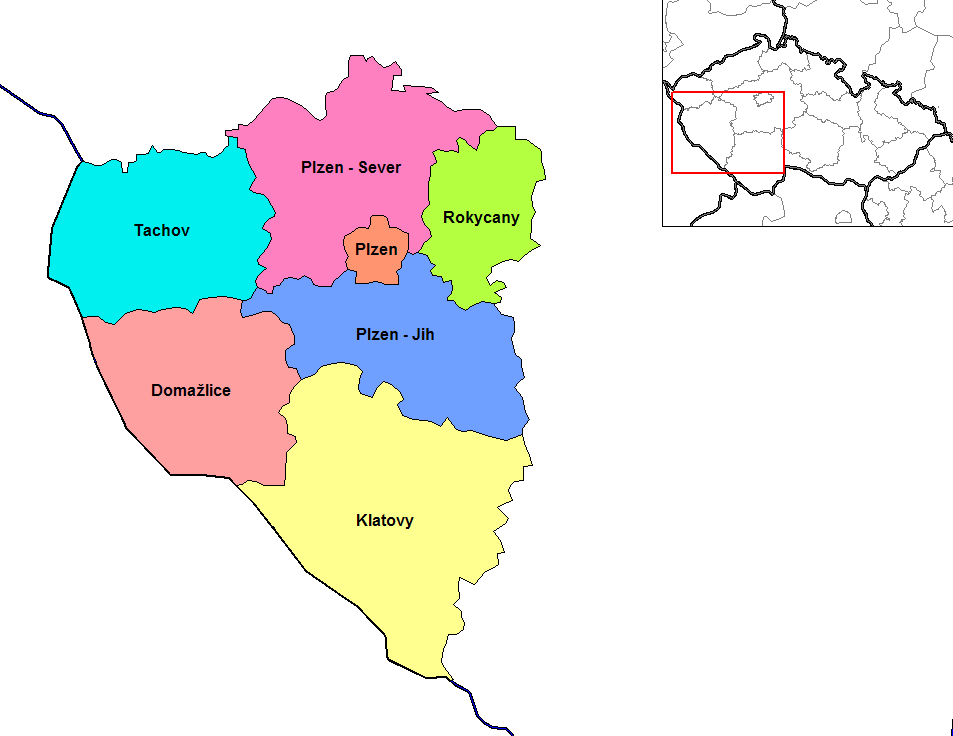
Districts of Plzeň Region

Domažlice
Klatovy
Plzeň City

Plzeň-Jih (Plzeň-South)
Plzeň-Sever (Plzeň-North)
Rokycany

Tachov

The districts still exist as regional units though most administration has been shifted to the Municipalities with Extended Competence and the Municipalities with Commissioned Local Authority.

=== Municipalities with Extended Competence ===
Since 1 January 2003, the region has been divided into 15 "Municipalities with Extended Competence" which took over most of the administration of the former District Authorities. Some of these are further divided into Municipalities with Commissioned Local Authority (in brackets):

- Blovice (Spálené Poříčí)
- Domažlice (Kdyně)
- Horažďovice
- Horšovský Týn (Staňkov)
- Kralovice (Manětín, Plasy)
- Klatovy (Nýrsko, Plánice)
- Nepomuk
- Nýřany (Město Touškov, Všeruby, Třemošná)
- Plzeň (Starý Plzenec)
- Přeštice
- Rokycany (Radnice, Zbiroh)
- Stod (Dobřany, Holýšov)
- Stříbro (Bezdružice)
- Sušice (Kašperské Hory)
- Tachov (Bor, Planá u Mariánských Lázní)

== Population ==
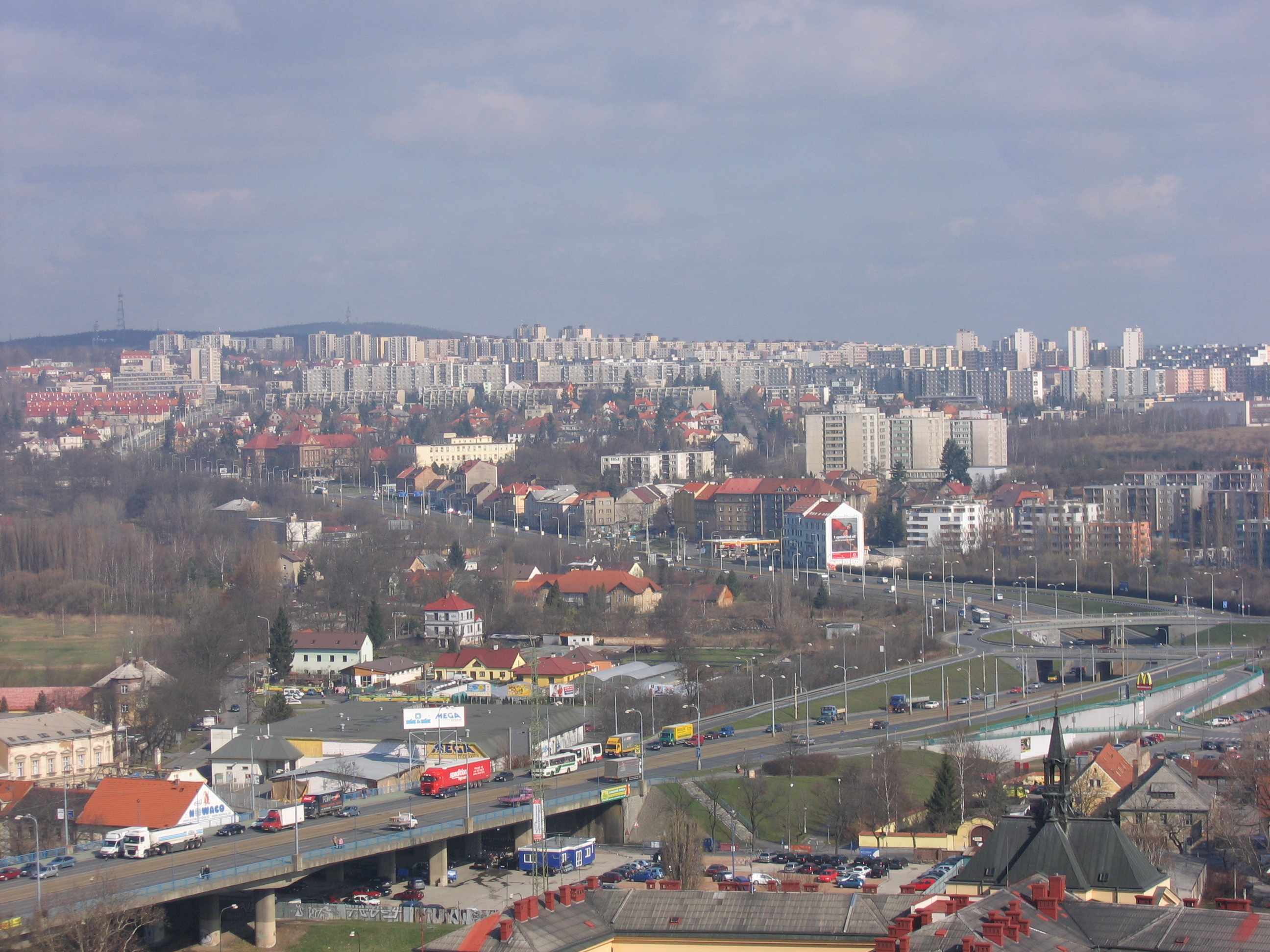
View at residential areas of Plzeň

As of 1 January 2019, the total population of the region was 584,672 inhabitants. Almost 30% of the inhabitants reside in Plzeň which is the fourth largest city in the Czech Republic with 172 thousand inhabitants. There are 56 towns in the region, which account for 67% of the total population. More than 33% of the population lives in municipalities with less than 2,000 inhabitants.

The Plzeň Region is the third least densely populated region in the Czech Republic. The population density is 75.6 inhabitants per km^{2} while the national average is 135 inhabitants per km^{2}. The least populated part of the region is Tachov District (39 inhabitants per km^{2}). The average age of the population in the region was 42.7 in 2019.

Historical population

Year	Pop.	±%
1869	559,509	—
1880	606,265	+8.4%
1890	618,959	+2.1%
1900	651,779	+5.3%
1910	691,598	+6.1%

Year	Pop.	±%
1921	700,331	+1.3%
1930	710,722	+1.5%
1950	528,878	−25.6%
1961	549,905	+4.0%
1970	550,514	+0.1%

Year	Pop.	±%
1980	567,930	+3.2%
1991	558,307	−1.7%
2001	550,720	−1.4%
2011	570,420	+3.6%
2021	581,436	+1.9%

Source: Censuses

=== Cities and towns ===
The table shows the most populated cities and towns in the region (as of 1 January 2024):

Name	Population	Area (km^{2})	District
Plzeň	185,599	138	Plzeň-City District
Klatovy	22,938	81	Klatovy District
Tachov	14,468	41	Tachov District
Rokycany	14,386	31	Rokycany District
Domažlice	11,155	25	Domažlice District
Sušice	10,783	46	Klatovy District
Stříbro	8,145	48	Tachov District
Nýřany	6,960	23	Plzeň-North District
Přeštice	6,804	25	Plzeň-South District

== Geography ==
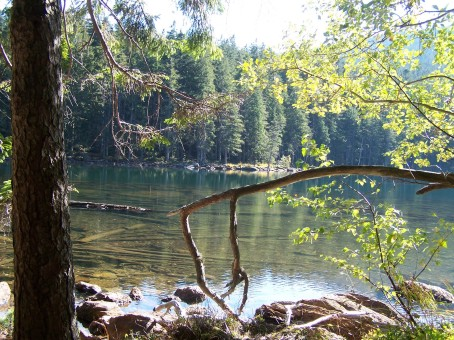
Černé Lake in Šumava, eastern bank

In the south-eastern part of the region there is a range of Bohemian Forest mountains. The capital Plzeň is surrounded by Plzeň Basin. The rest of the region is occupied by highlands, namely Plzeň Highlands and Brdy Highlands. The largest part of the region belongs to the drainage basin of Berounka river. The southern part of the region belongs to the drainage basin of Otava River.

The agricultural land covers 50.2% of the total area of the region, where 67.9% is arable land. Forests cover 39.7% of the total region's area, with higher proportions of forests can be found especially in Šumava, Brdy Highlands and the Bohemian Forest.

There are raw material resources on the region's territory, such as coal, heat-resistant and ceramic clays, and building stone limestone. The conditions for farming are quite favourable as well.

The climate of the region is influenced by the western and south-western winds from the Atlantic Ocean, which bring the largest part of the regional precipitation. The climate varies considerably within the region.

== Economy ==
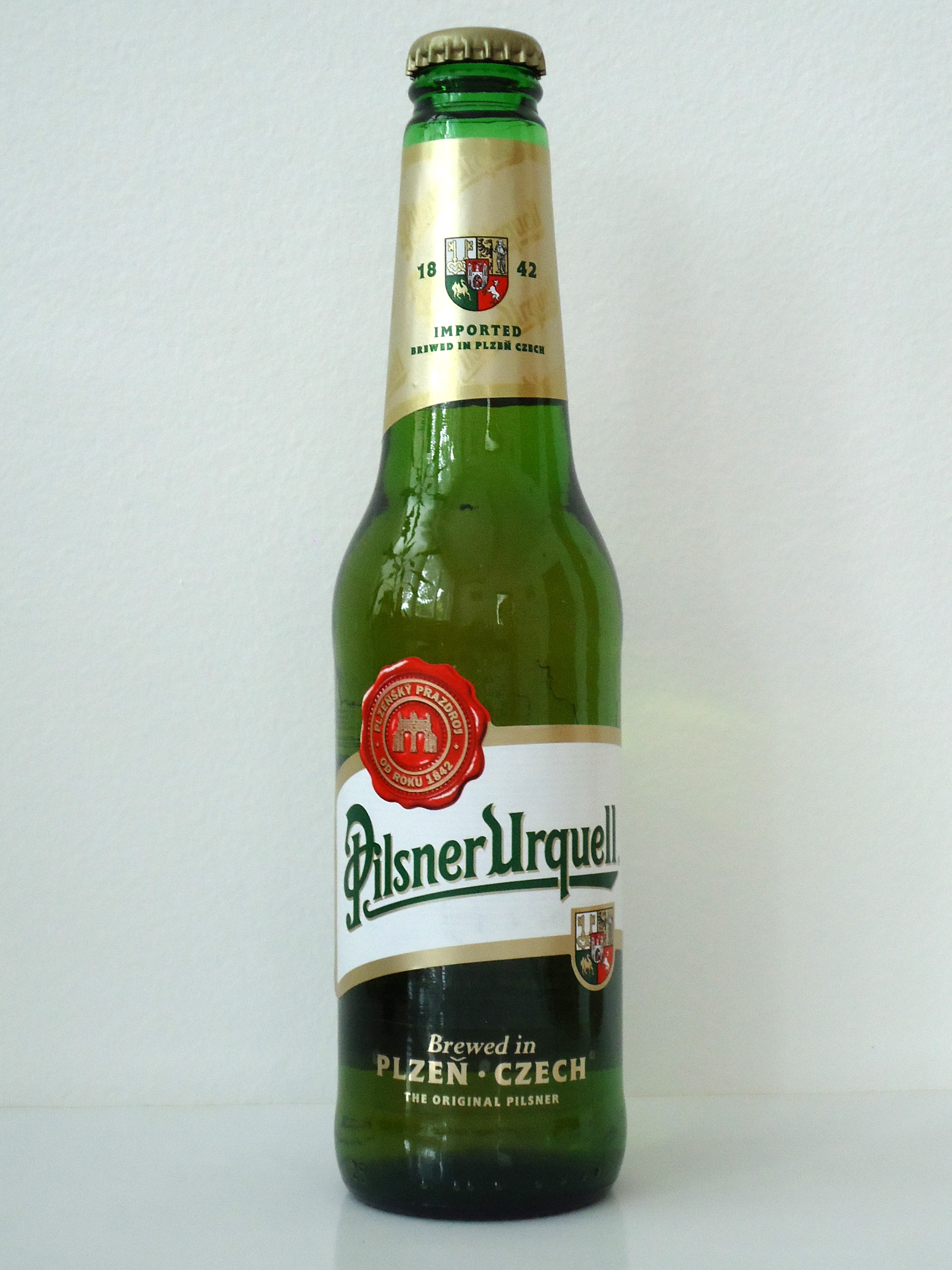
Pilsner Urquell beer

Plzeň Region is average in economic development when compared to the rest of the Czech Republic. In 2021, the region produced 4.87% of the national GDP. The region's total GDP was CZK 297.919 billion (EUR 12.4 billion) and per capita GDP was CZK 504,354 which was the fourth highest regional result out of fourteen. The most significant sectors in the region are engineering, food processing, building materials industry, ceramics industry, energy production and metallurgy. In 2010 there were 207,000 people employed in the region, accounting for 36% of the total population. In 2011, the business sector in the Plzeň Region comprised 147,000 entities, the majority of which were sole traders. 40% of all economic subjects were based in Plzeň area. The average wage in the region in September 2013 was CZK 23,105 (approximately EUR 905). Compared to other Czech regions, the Plzeň Region has a relatively low level of unemployment (6.07% as of September 2013).

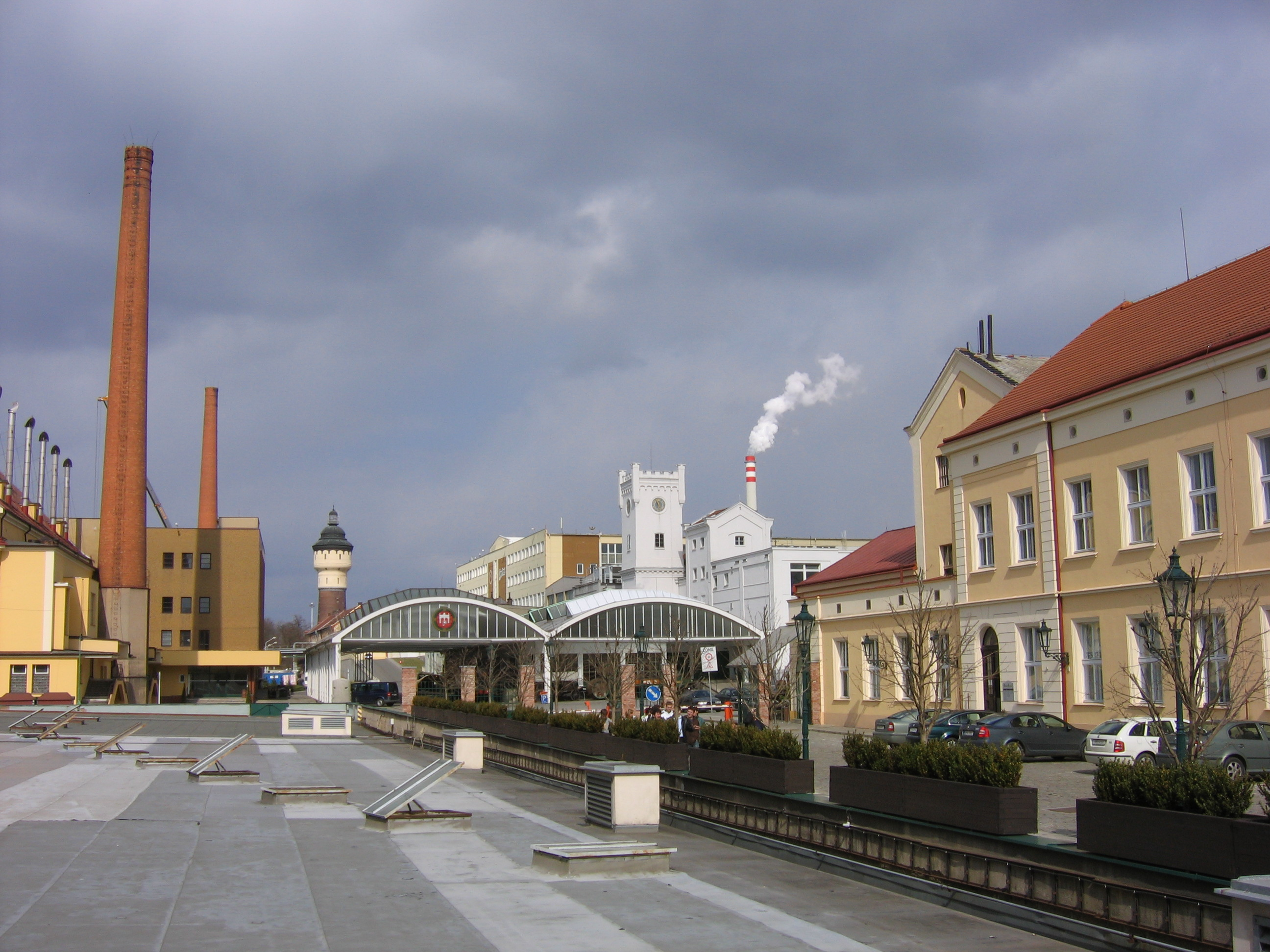
Pilsner Urquell beer

The most significant engineering company in the region is supposedly Škoda Machine Tool a.s. producing for example milling and boring machines, centre lathes, turntables, etc. Other important industrial companies are DIOSS Nýřany a.s. (accumulators and batteries), Okula Nýrsko a.s. (processing of plastics) and Lasselsberger s.r.o (ceramics industry). A number of foreign investors based their establishments in the region in the recent decades, namely Panasonic AVC Networks Czech s.r.o. (flat screen displays production), Yazaki Wiring Technologies Czech s.r.o (components for automobile industry), Vishay Electronic s.r.o. (production of electric components), Borgers Cs spol. s.r.o. (plastic products), etc.

Among important food processing companies of the region belong:

- Pilsner Urquell Brewery (Czech: Plzeňský Prazdroj a.s.), which was established in 1843 and is the largest Czech beer exporter;
- Stock Plzeň a.s., the largest Czech producer of liquors;
- Bohemia Sekt Českomoravská vinařská a.s., an important Czech producer of wines, based in Starý Plzenec

The road network of the region consists of 5,129 km of road, whereof 109 km are motorways. The main motorway in the region is the D5 motorway connecting Plzeň with Prague and Germany. As of 1 January 2011 there was 711 km of railways.

== Environment ==
Compared to the rest of the Czech Republic, the quality of the environment may be regarded as good. Specific emissions in the region are lower than the national average. The least damaged areas comprise the mountainous parts of Šumava, the Bohemian Forest, western parts of Brdy Highlands, and the areas surrounding the municipalities of Manětín and Nečtiny. The protection of the environment in Šumava has been ensured by the establishment of Šumava National Park and the Šumava Landscape Protected Area. In 2005, the Protected Landscape Area Bohemian Forest was newly designated. There are 182 small protected areas in the Region and several wildlife parks have been designated to conserve the landscape variability.

On the other hand, the environment is severely damaged in Plzeň. Specific emissions reported for the Plzeň-City District are several times above the national average. Plzeň and its surroundings suffer from heavy road traffic and high concentration of industrial activities. The traffic worsens quality of the environment by emissions (nitrogen oxides, hydrocarbons) and noise. Moreover, the areas surrounding the municipalities Nýřany, Tlučná, Vejprnice, Břasy, Radnice, Stříbro and Ejpovice were affected by mining or quarrying activities.

== Cross-border cooperation ==
Since 1993, Domažlice District, Klatovy District and Tachov District have been using the European support programme of the cross-border cooperation. The municipalities in the border areas of the Czech Republic and Germany form two Euroregions: the Bohemian Forest- the Bavarian Forest–Mühlveiertel and Egrensis. Cross-border co-operation with Bavaria on the Euroregional basis helps moderate social-economic differences.

== Tourism and culture ==
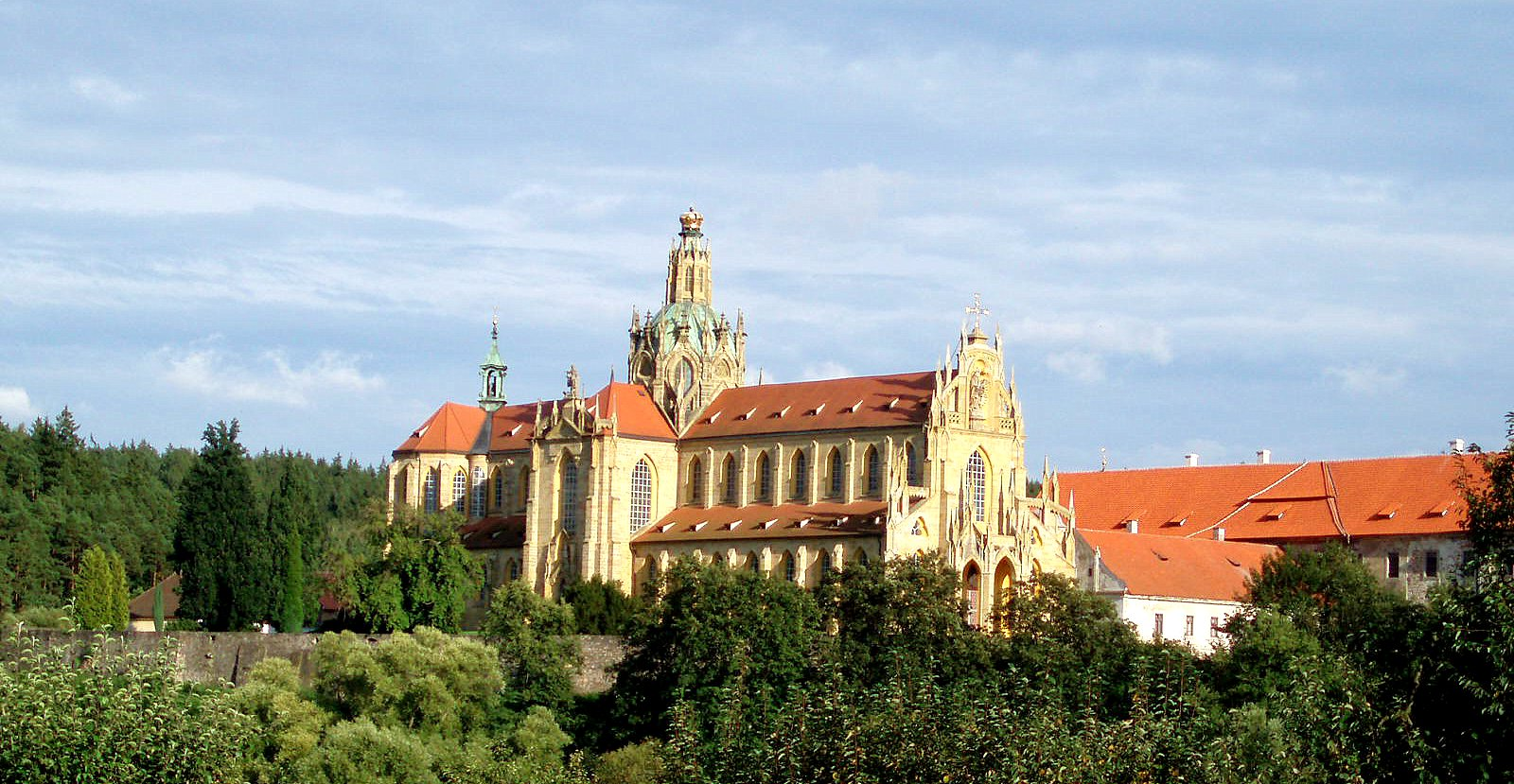
Kladruby monastery

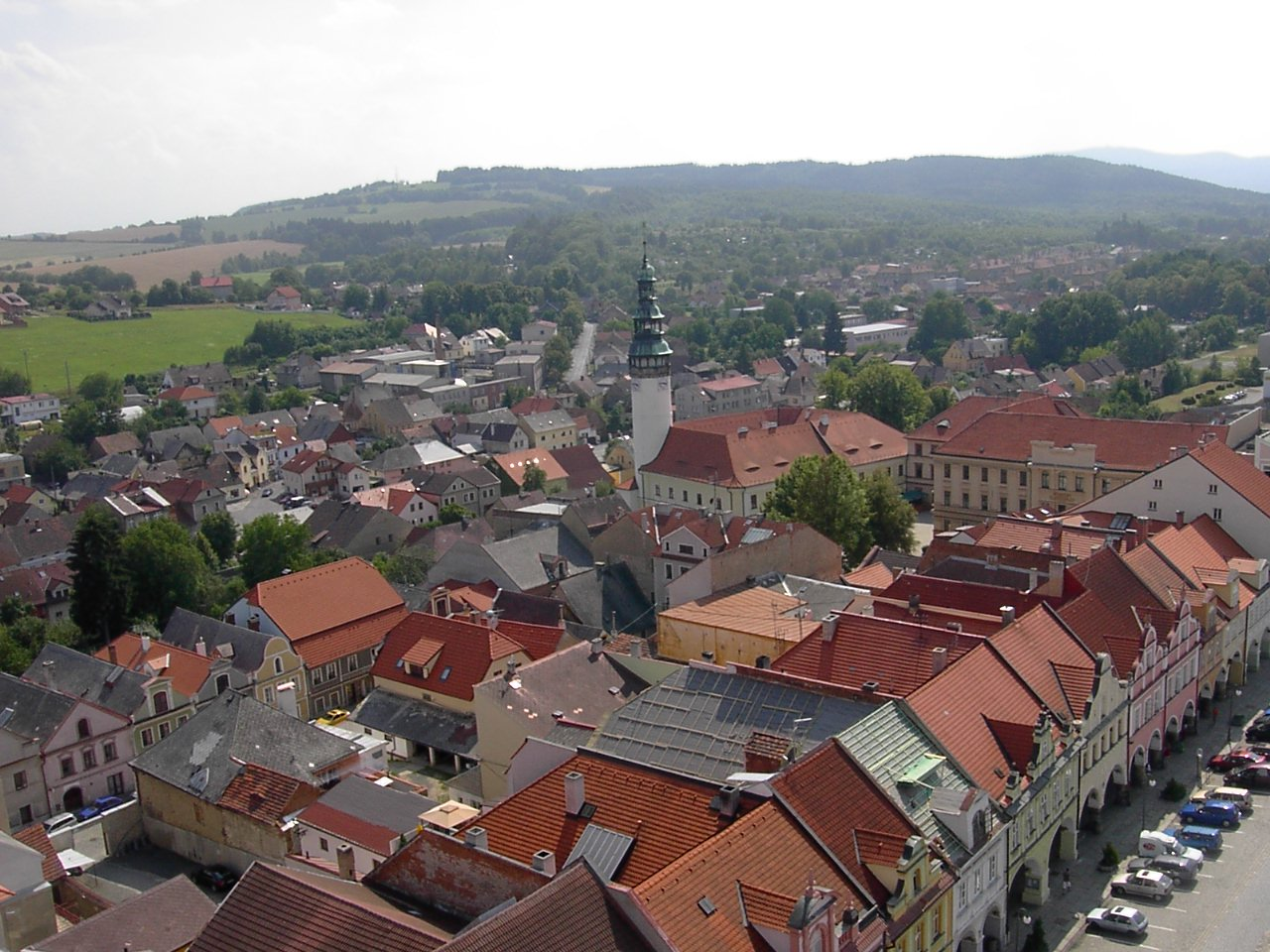
Domažlice

The region is attractive for tourists. Plzeň offers many historical landmarks and natural points of interest. Tourists are also attracted by a dense network of recreation and hiking trails, zoological and botanical gardens in Plzeň and hills in its surroundings – Krkavec, Chlum and Sylván with observation towers. Other places of interest in the region are (in alphabetical order):

- the remains of Buben, Libštejn and Radyně Gothic castles and Rabštejn nad Střelou castle;
- Horšovský Týn with its Renaissance chateau;
- Kaceřov Renaissance chateau;
- Kašperk Castle;
- Kladruby monastery;
- Kozel chateau;
- Lužany chateau;
- Manětín baroque chateau;
- Nebílovy baroque chateau;
- Plasy Monastery;
- The water castle at Švihov.
- The Black tower and the old town in Klatovy.

Also the town of Domažlice and its traditional summer Chod Festival attract attention of many visitors.

== Gallery ==
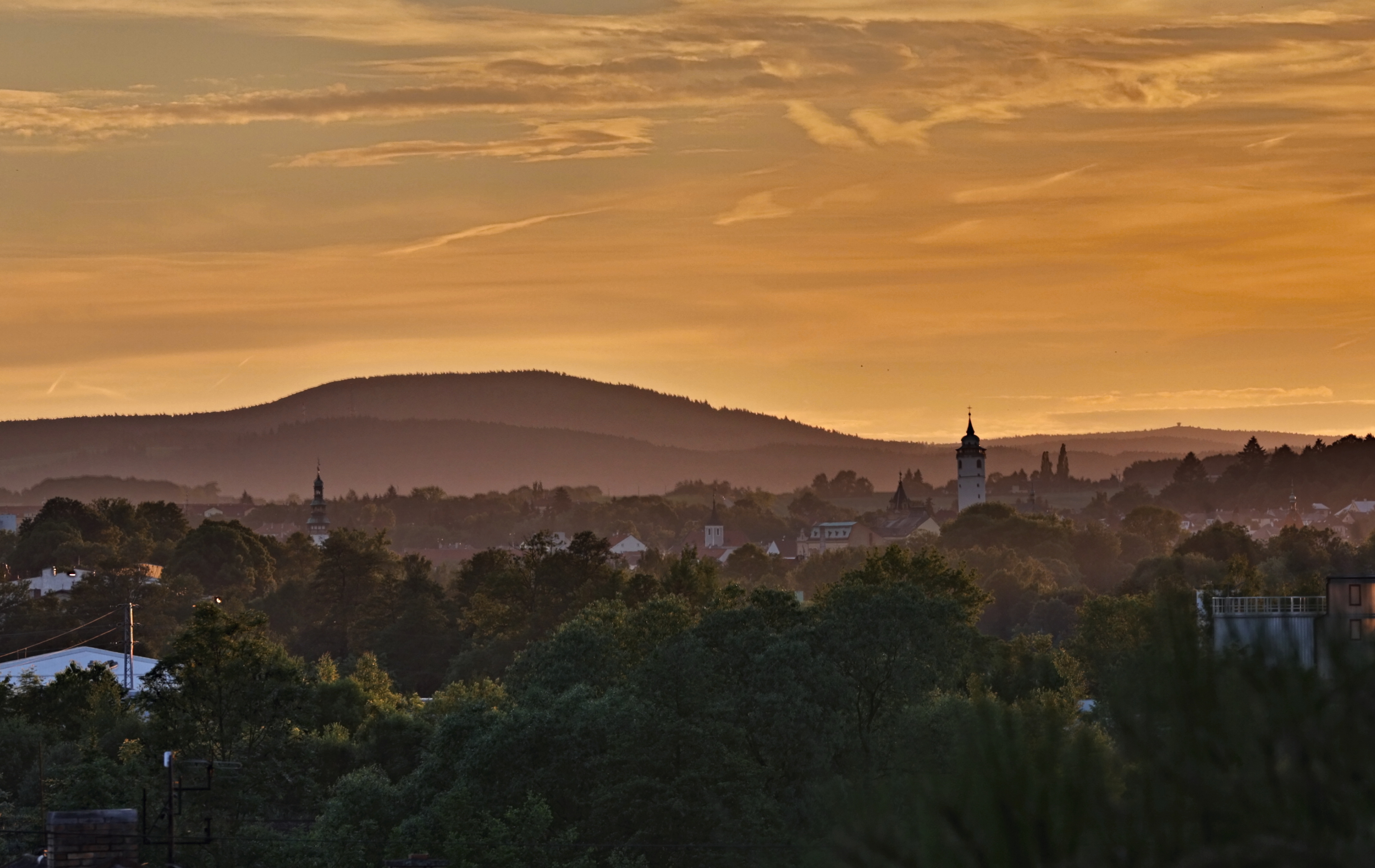
Domažlice at dawn

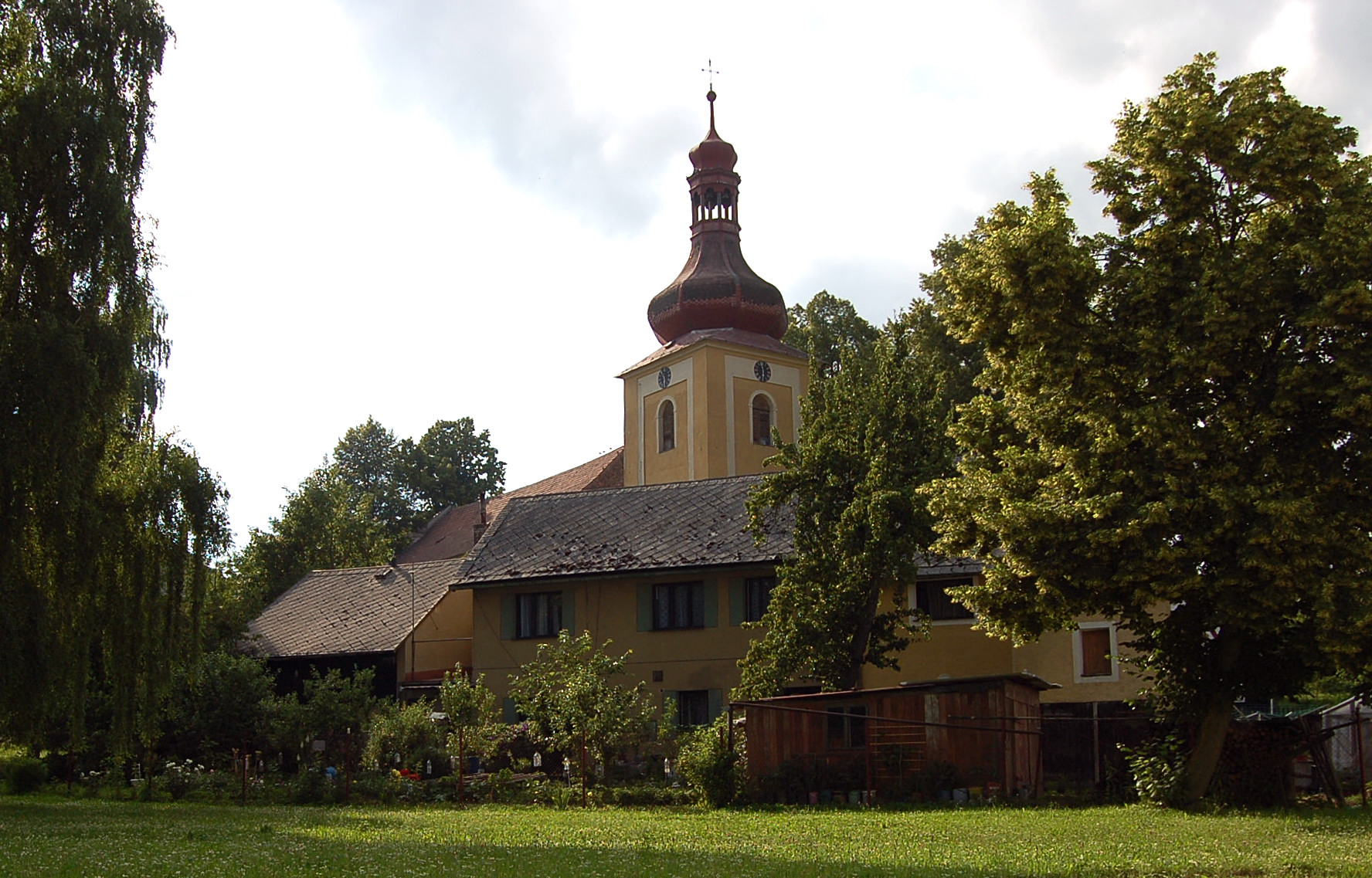
A church in Chodský Újezd

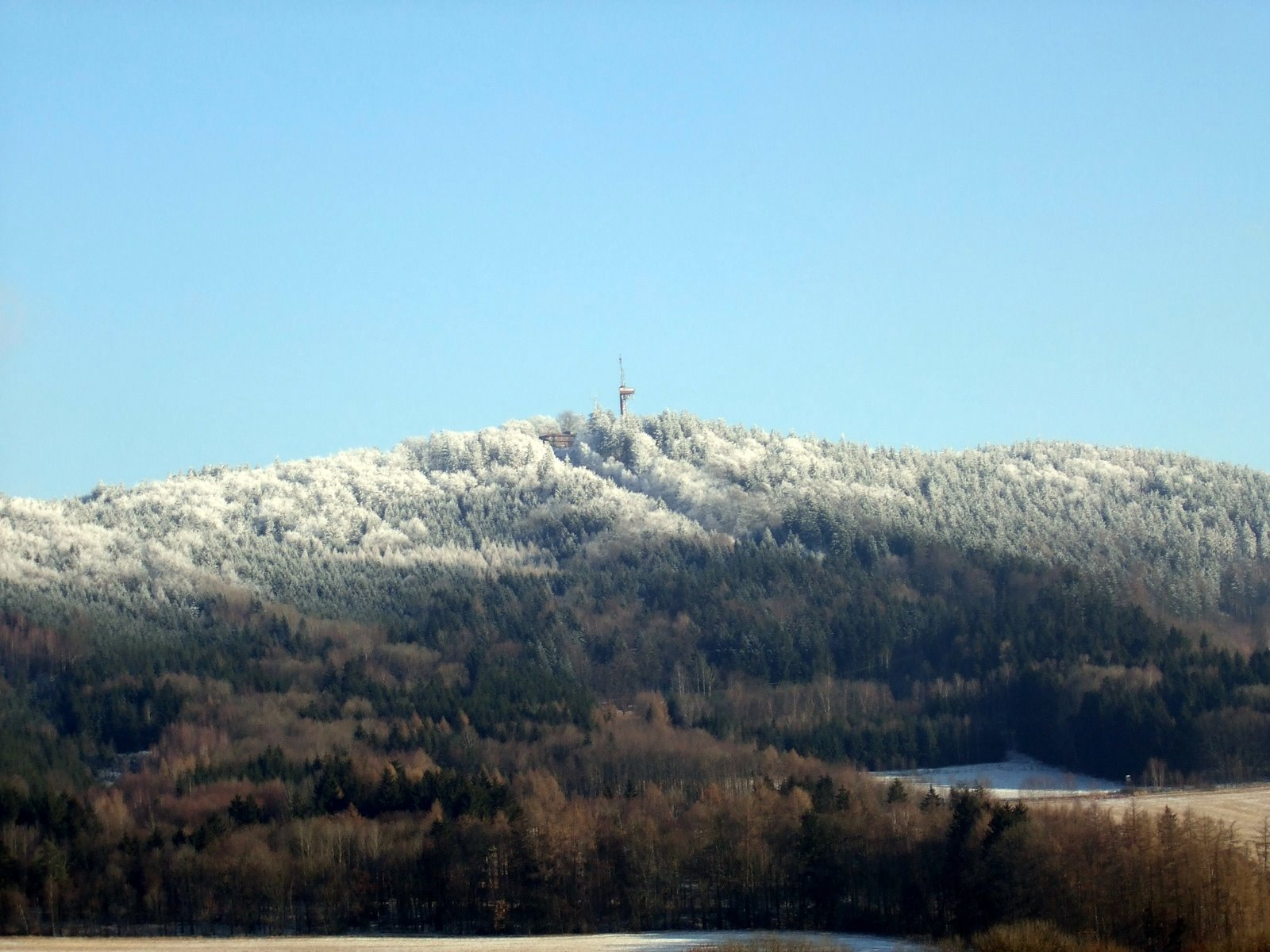
Lookout tower at Koráb hill near to Kdyně

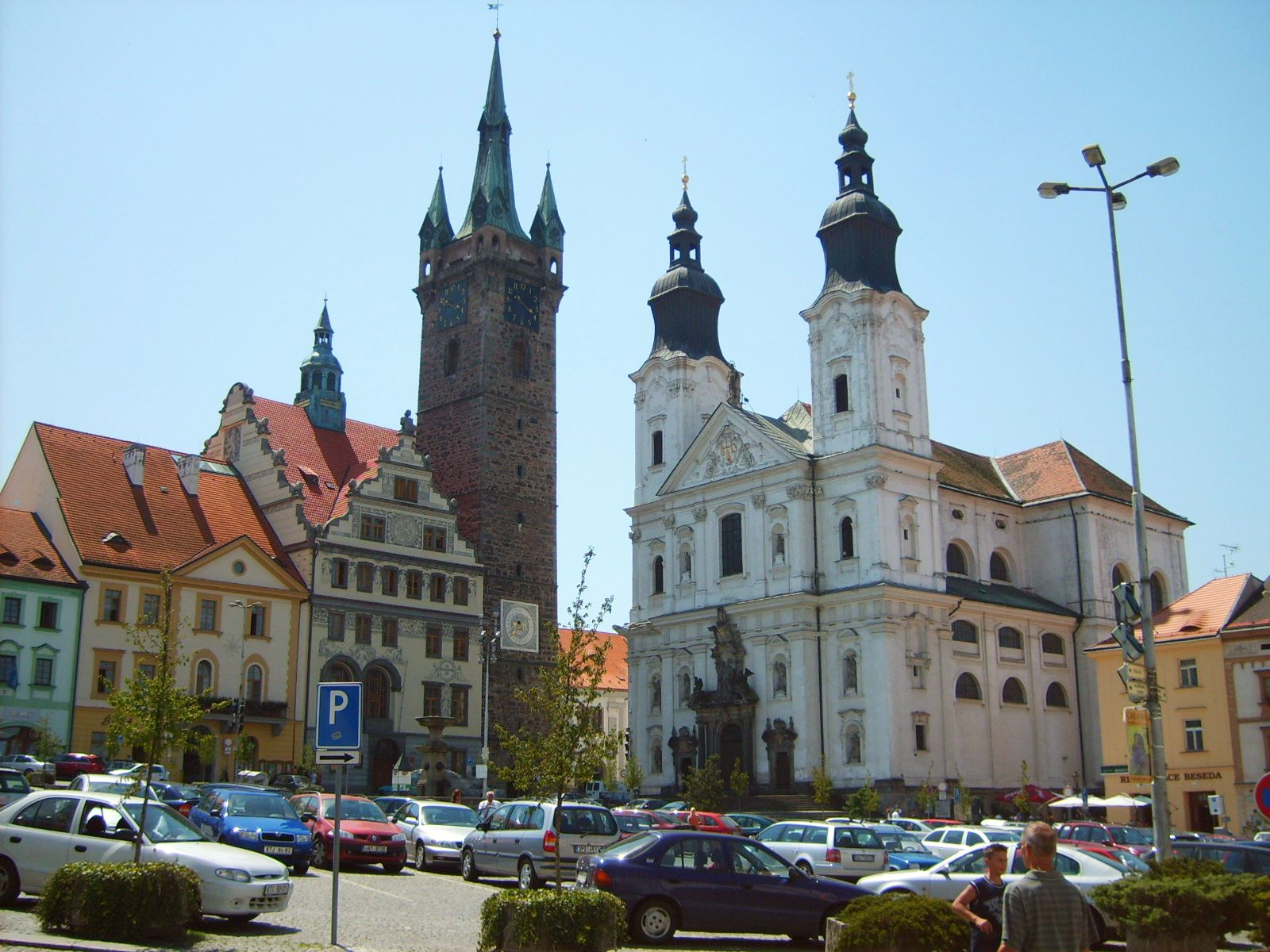
Klatovy

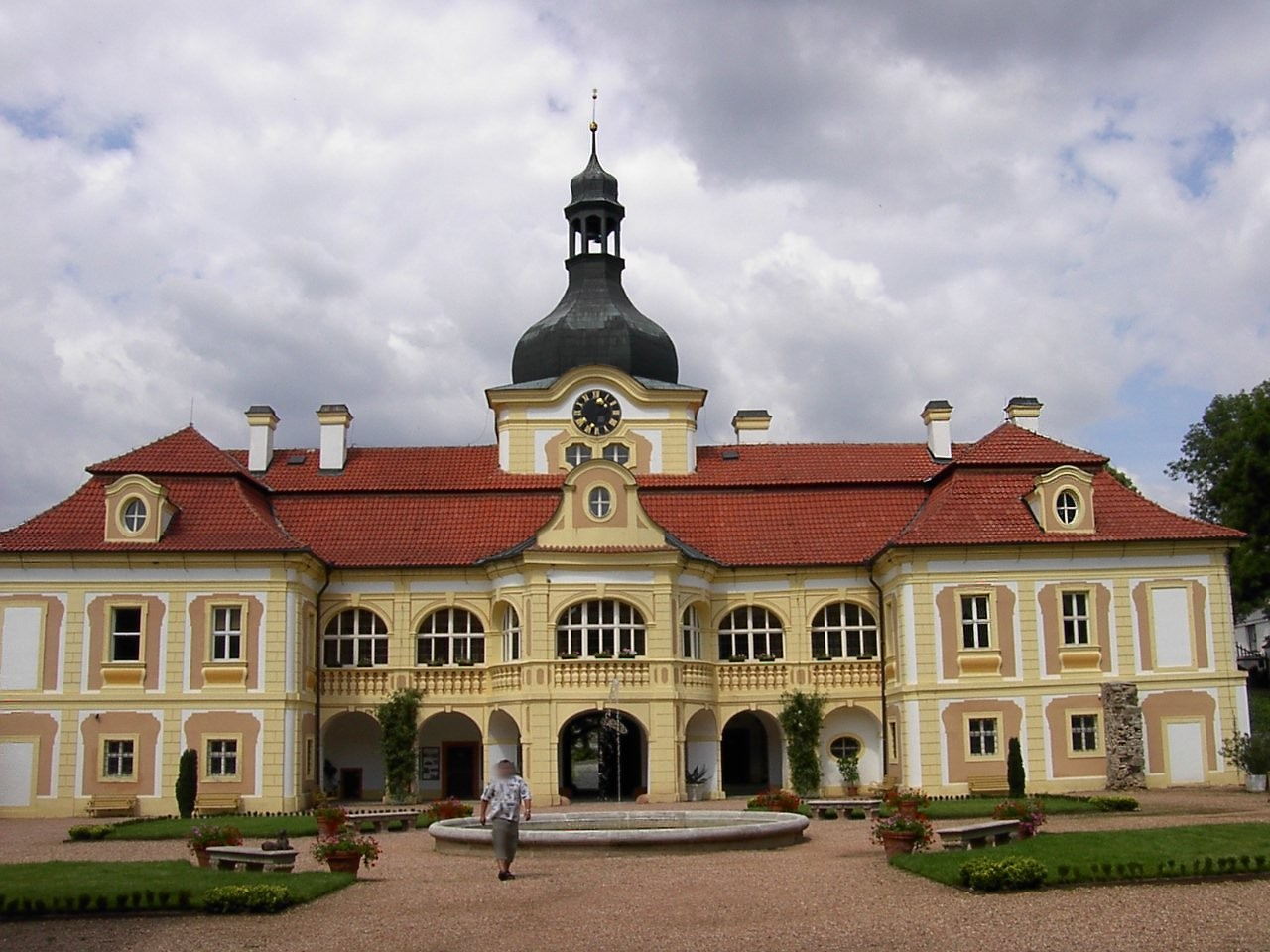
Chauteau in Nebílovy

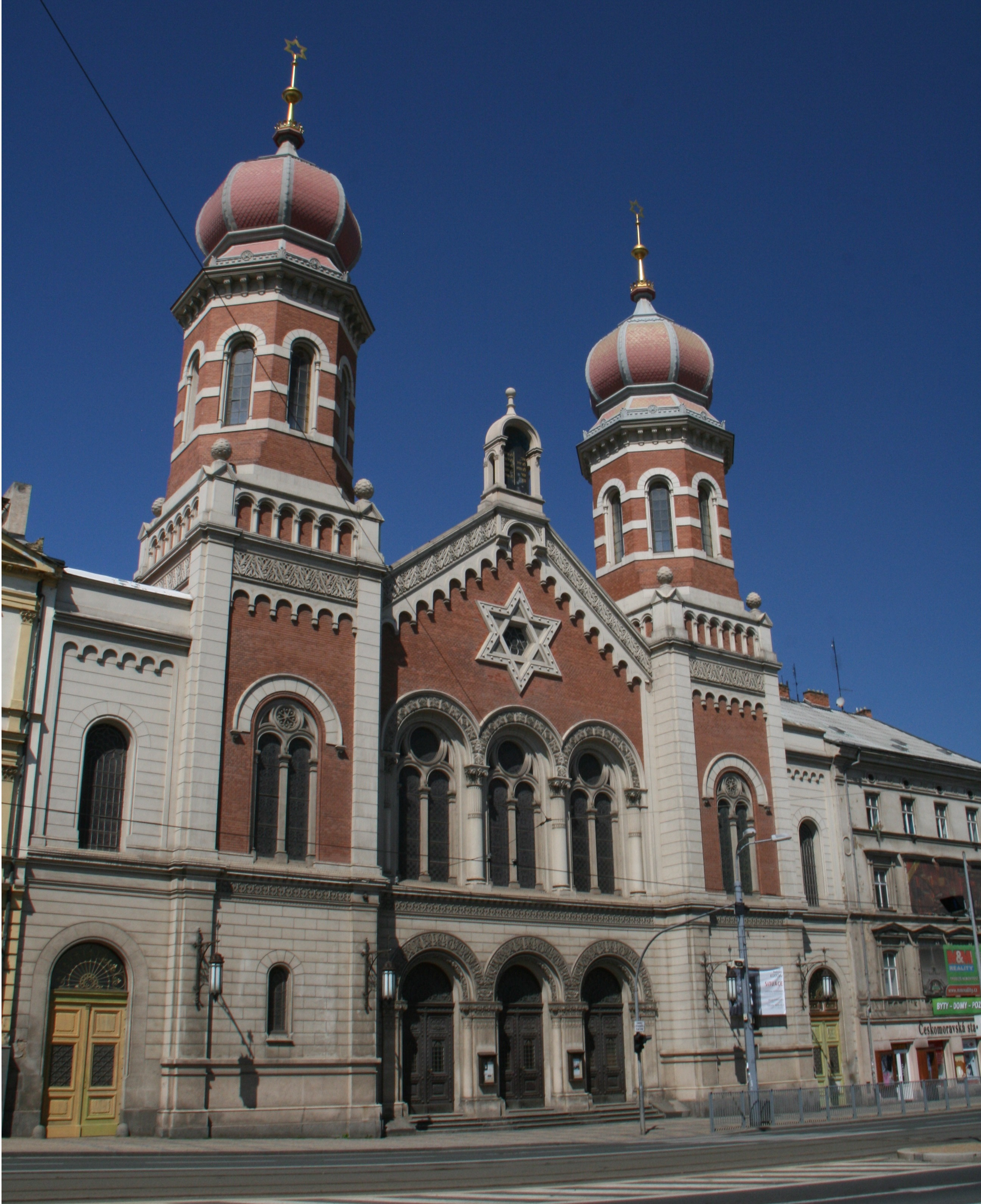
Great Synagogue in Plzeň

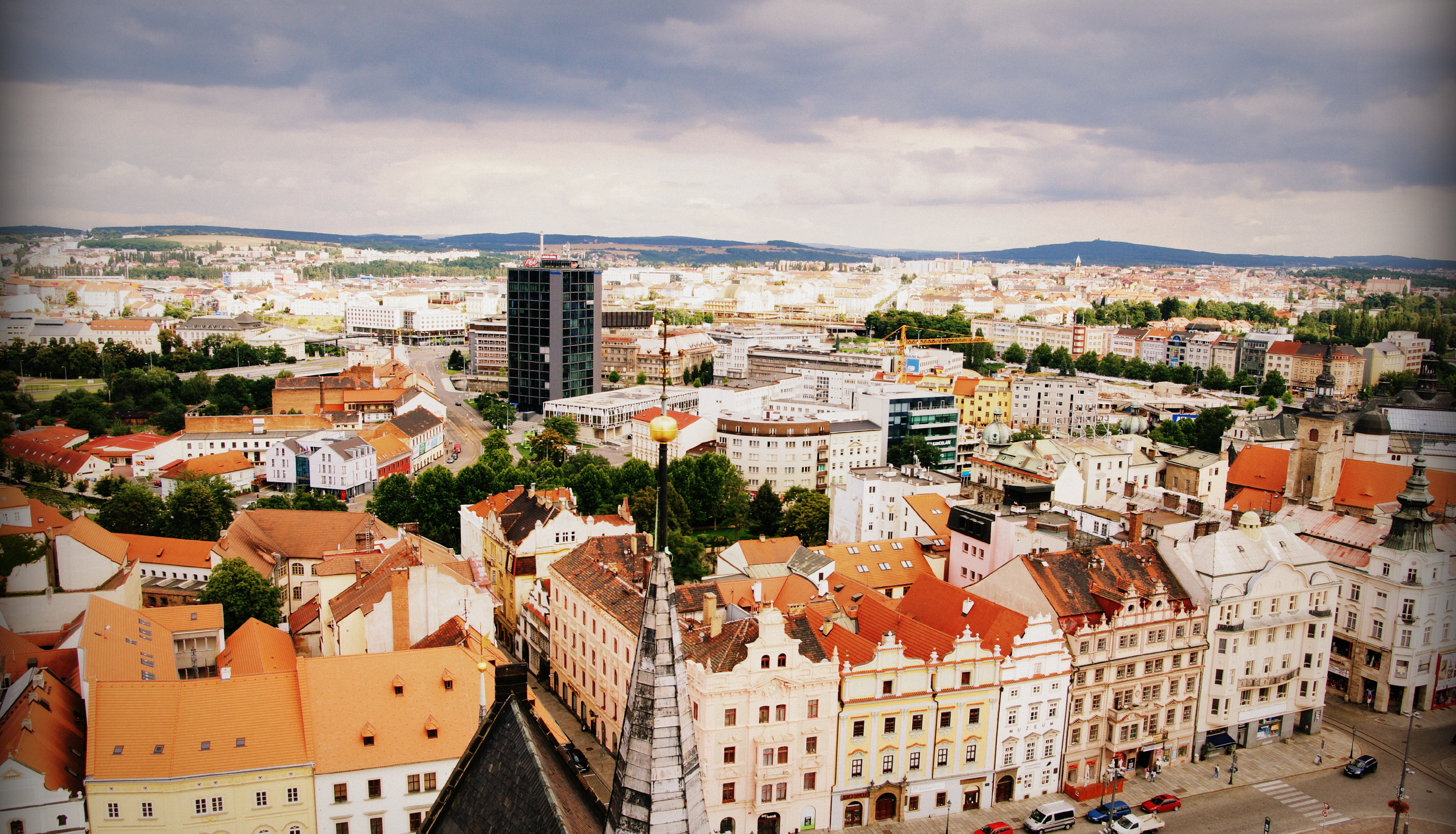
Plzeň

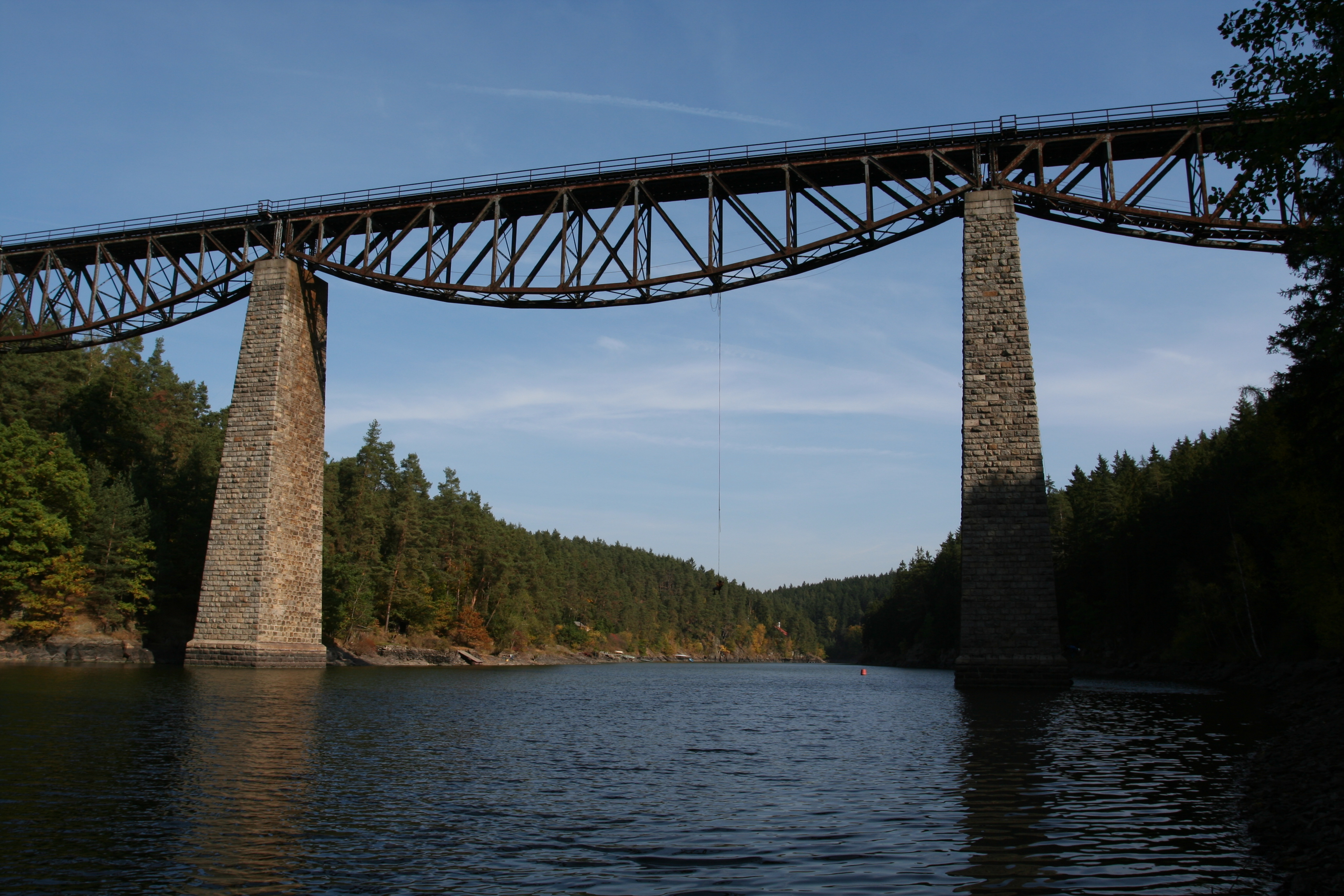
Pnovany bridge near Plzeň

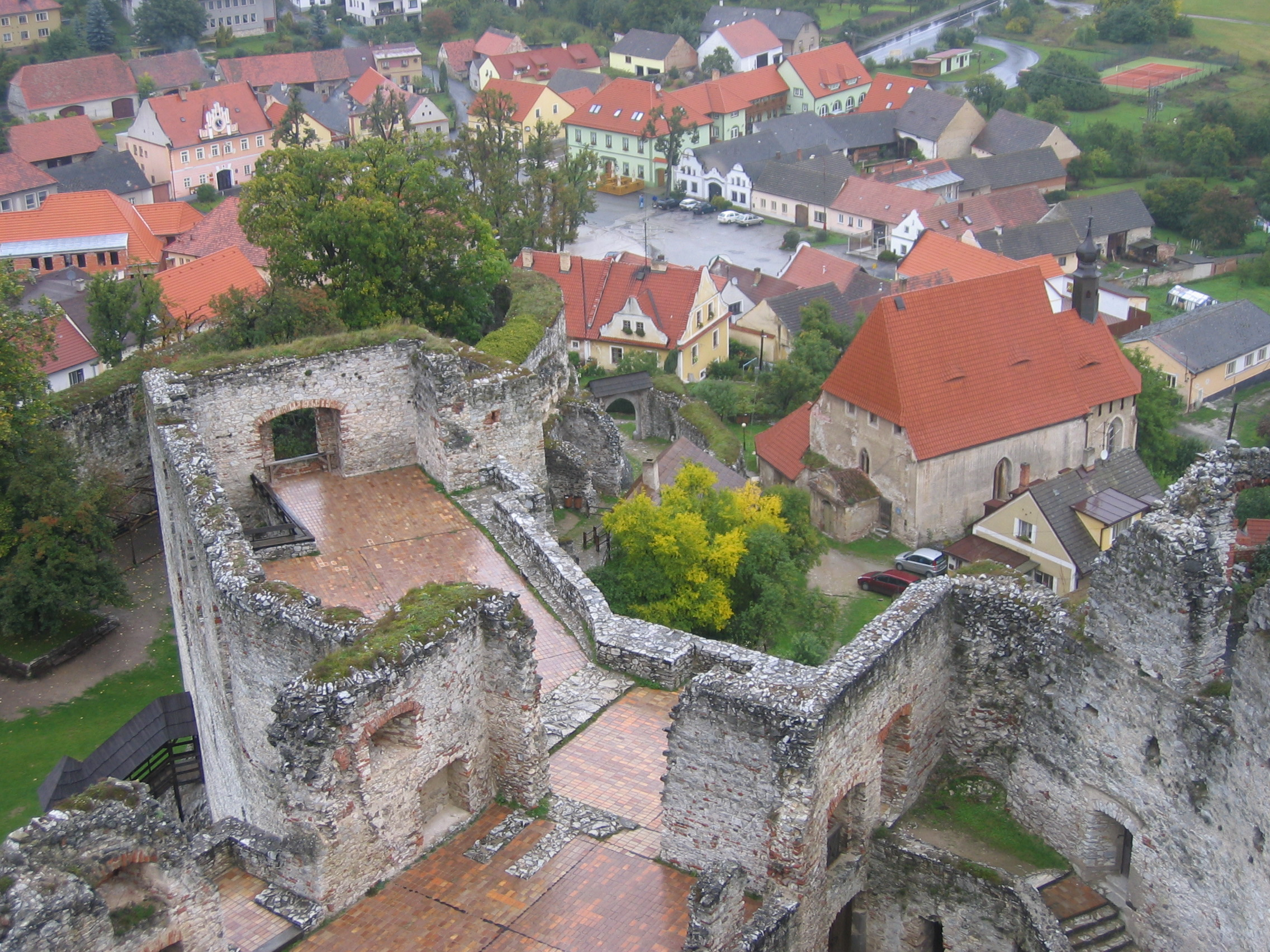
Ruins of the Rabí Castle

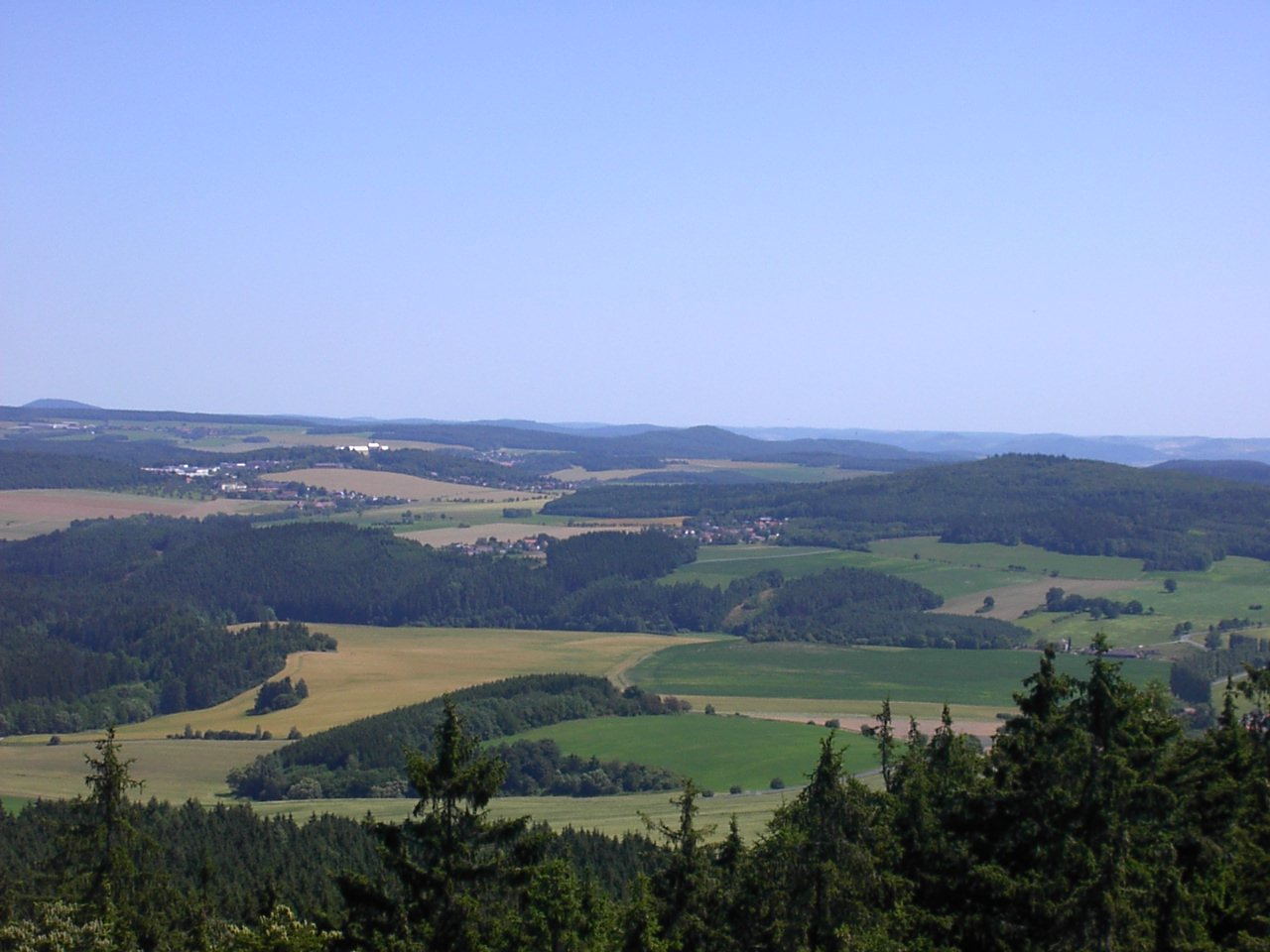
North-east view from Radeč

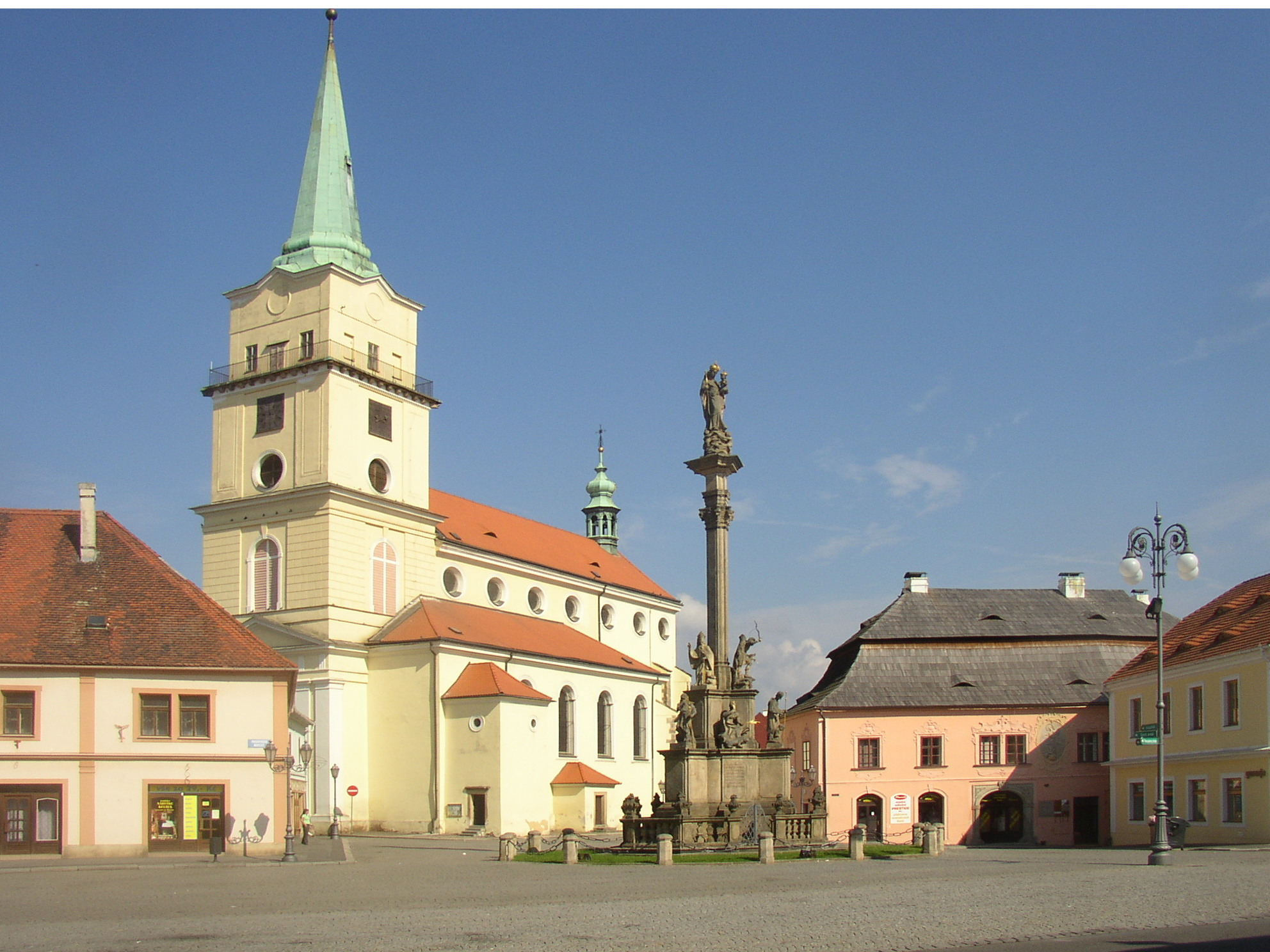
Josef Urban Square in Rokycany

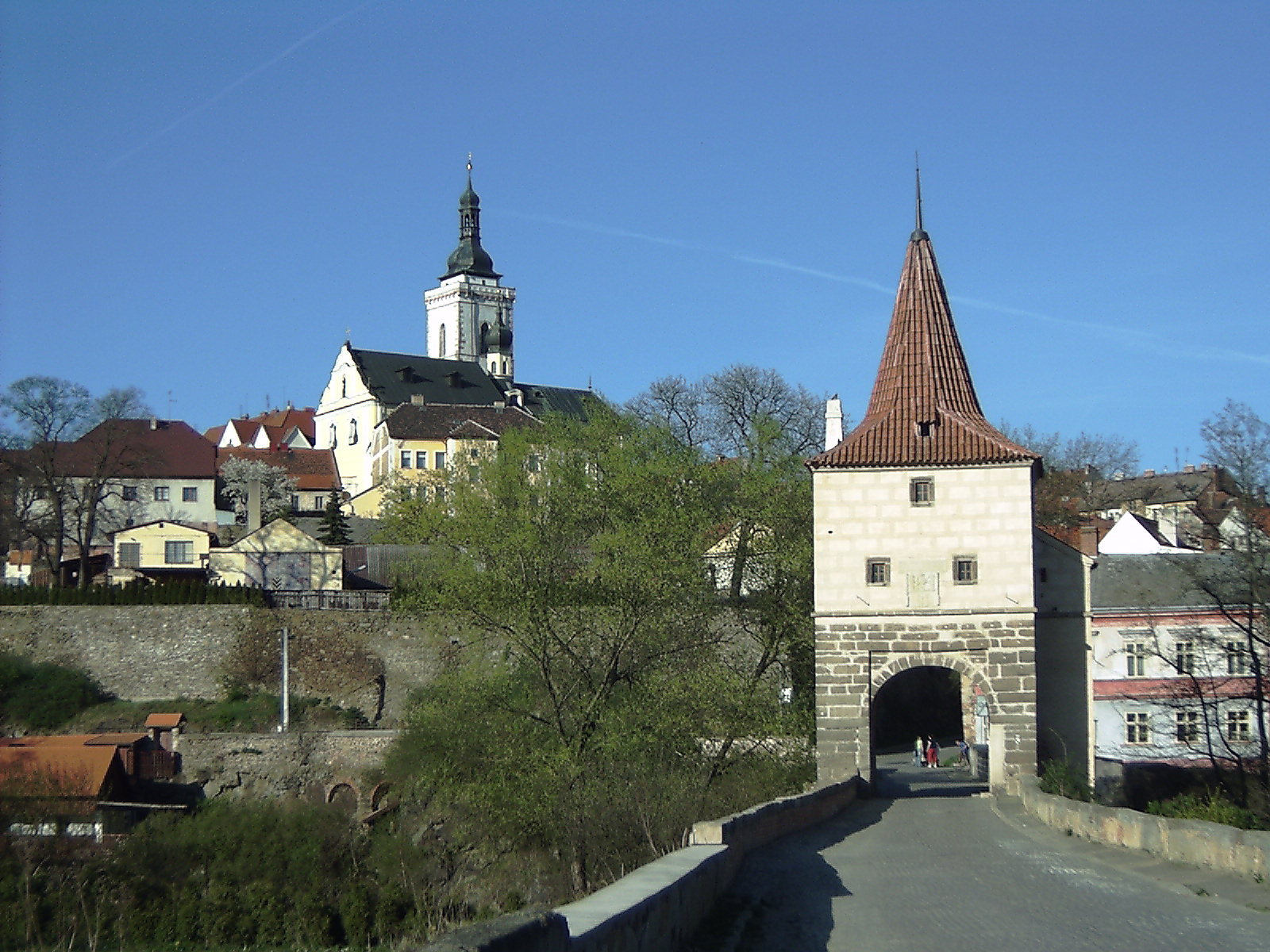
Stříbro

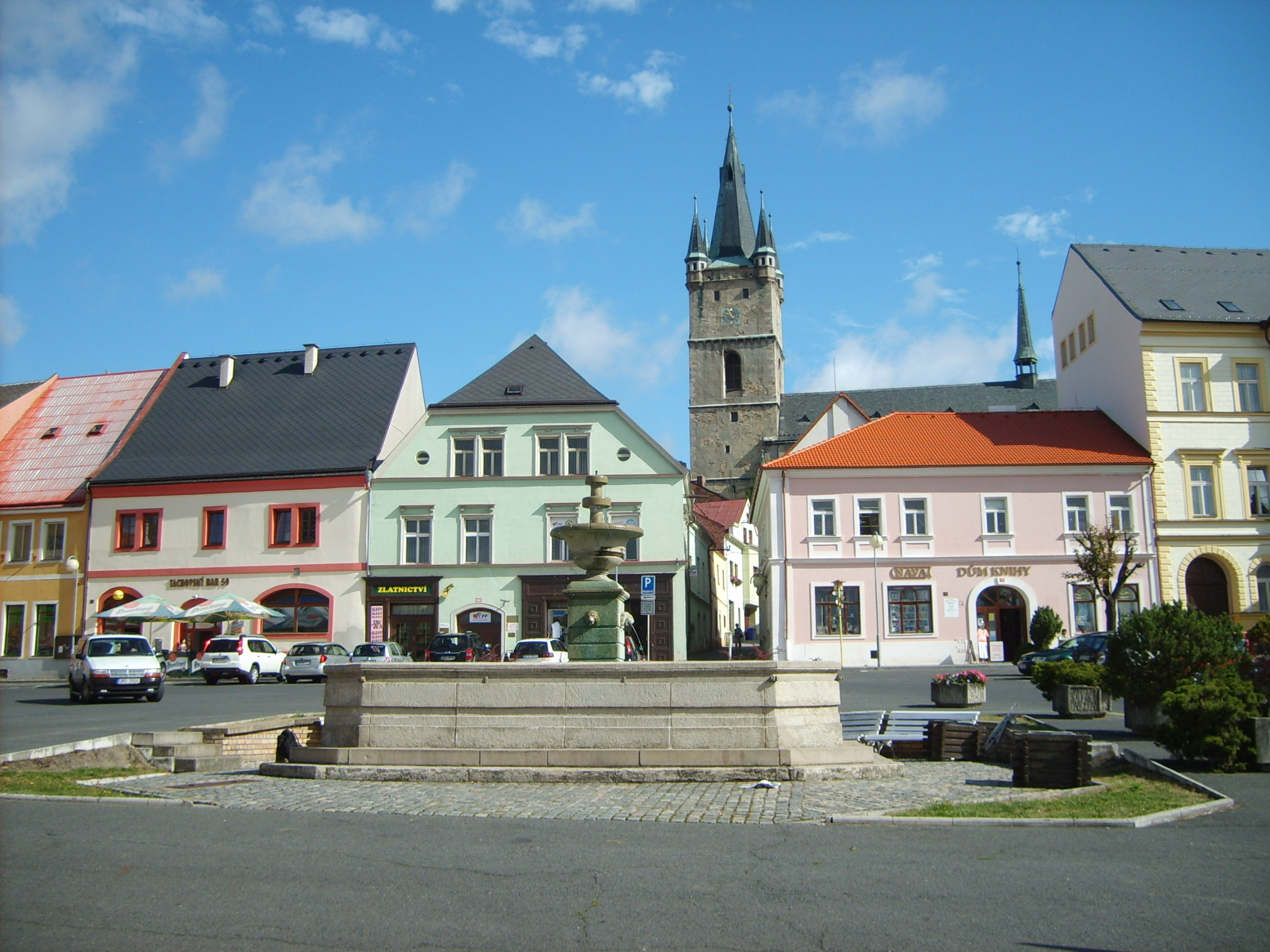
Tachov

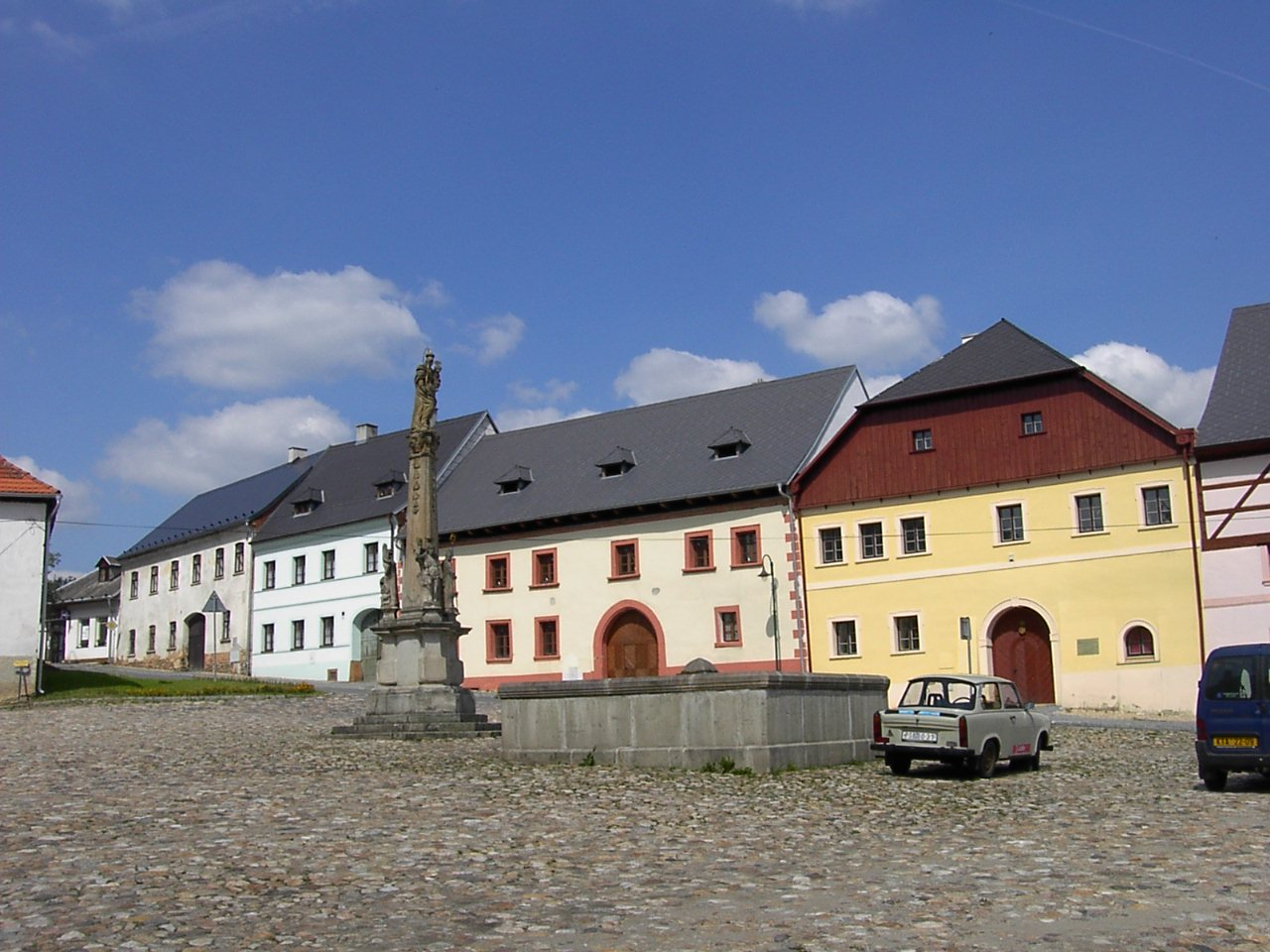
Square in village Úterý

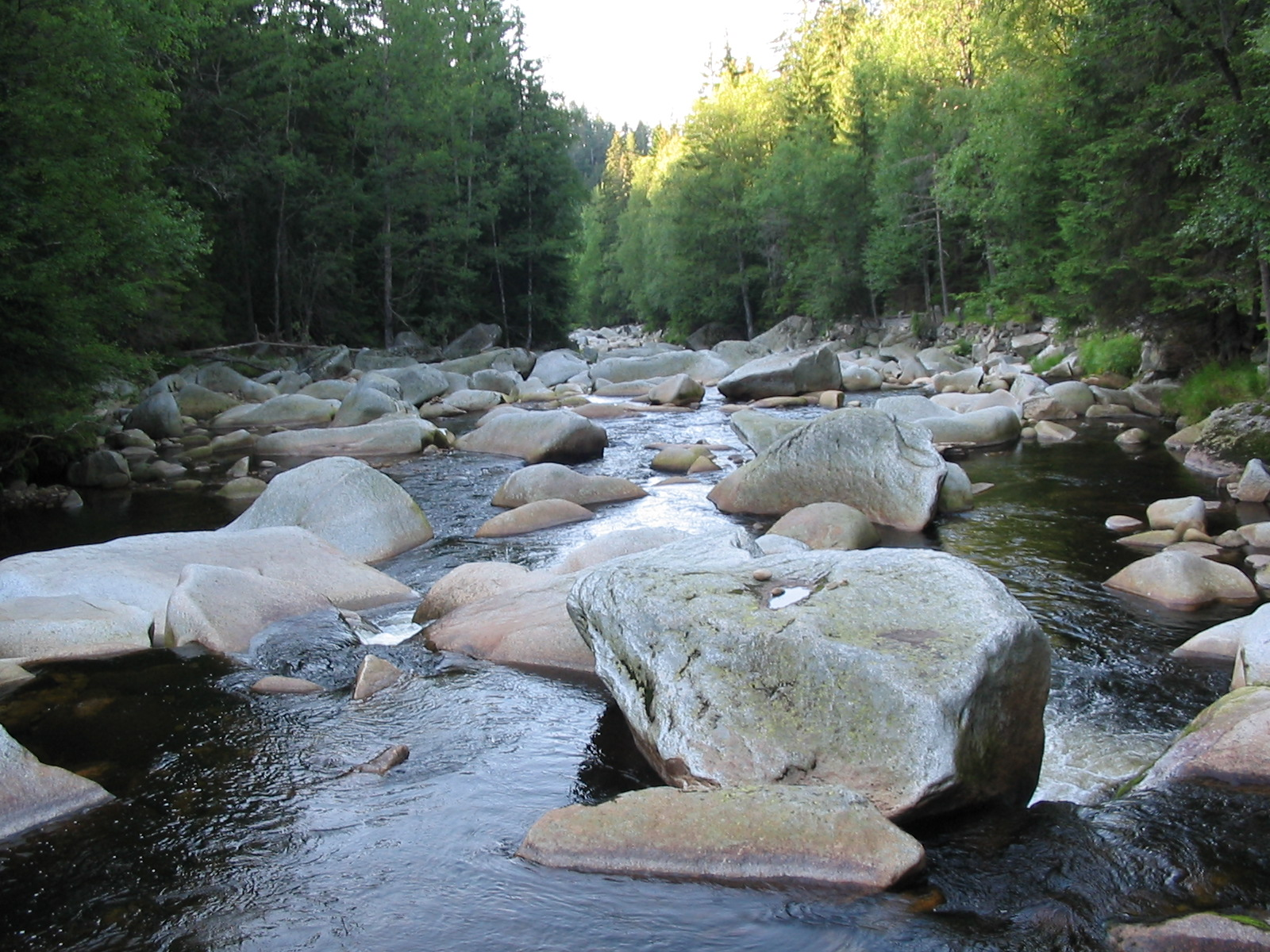
River Vydra, a tributary of Otava
