= Lisov =

- Municipality
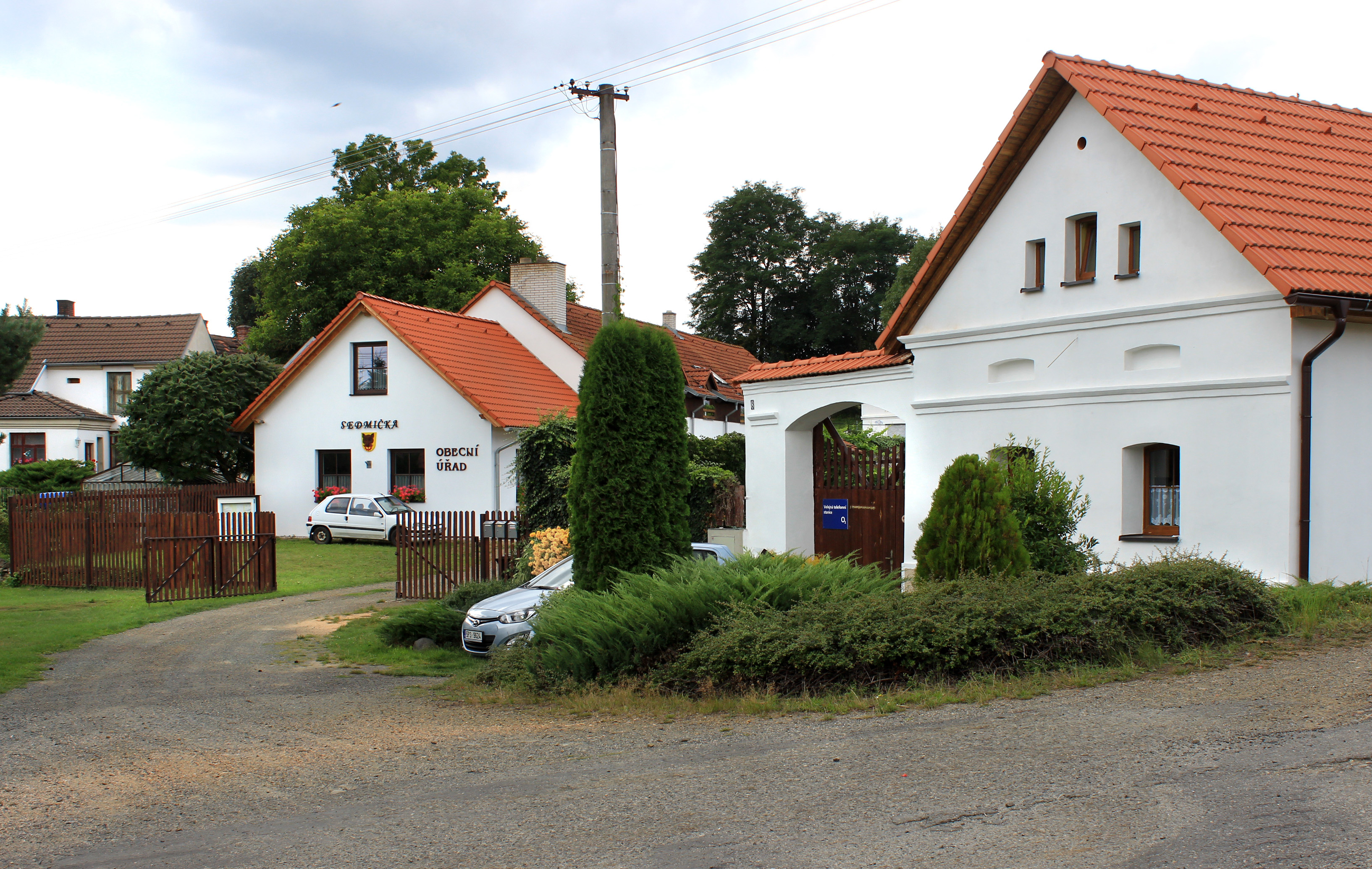
- Centre of Lisov

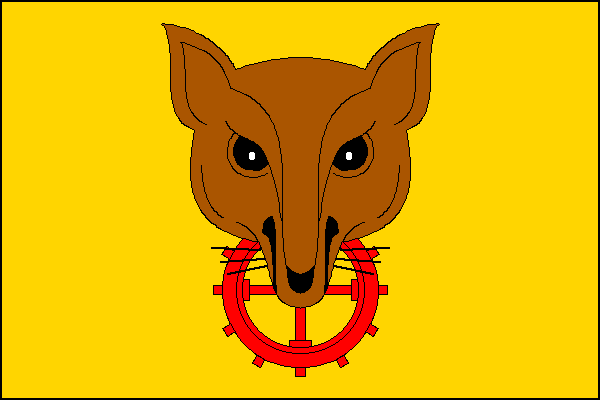
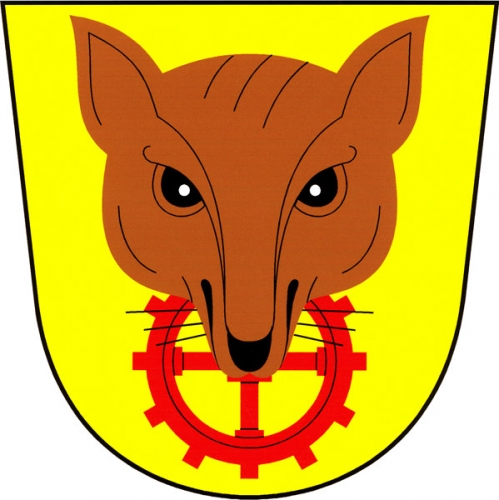
- Flag Coat of arms

- Location in the Czech Republic
- Coordinates: 49°38′19″N 13°6′3″E
- Country: Czech Republic
- Region: Plzeň
- District: Plzeň-South
- First mentioned: 1243

Area
  - Total: 3.91 km^{2} (1.51 sq mi)
- Elevation: 386 m (1,266 ft)

Population (2026-01-01)
  - Total: 142
  - Density: 36.3/km^{2} (94.1/sq mi)
- Time zone: UTC+1 (CET)
  - Summer (DST): UTC+2 (CEST)
- Postal code: 333 01
- Website: www.lisovou.cz

Lisov is a municipality and village in Plzeň-South District in the Plzeň Region of the Czech Republic. It has about 100 inhabitants.

== Etymology ==
The name was derived from the personal name Lis, Lisa or Lysý. In the oldest documents, the name was written as Lyzov.

== Geography ==
Lisov is located about 22 kilometres (14 mi) southwest of Plzeň. It lies in the Plasy Uplands. The highest point is at 414 m (1,358 ft) above sea level. The streams Hořina and Touškovský potok flow along the southern and eastern municipal border, respectively. They join the Radbuza River just outside the territory of Lisov.

== History ==
The first written mention of Lisov is from 1243. Until 1271, the village was a royal property. In 1271, King Ottokar II donated Lisov to the Chotěšov Abbey. From 1587 to the 1620s, Lisov belonged to the Horšovský Týn estate. During the Thirty Years' War, the population of Lisov declined and the village was repopulated by the German settlers.

== Demographics ==
Historical population

Year	Pop.	±%
1869	177	—
1880	175	−1.1%
1890	202	+15.4%
1900	175	−13.4%
1910	205	+17.1%

Year	Pop.	±%
1921	217	+5.9%
1930	219	+0.9%
1950	163	−25.6%
1961	164	+0.6%
1970	120	−26.8%

Year	Pop.	±%
1980	106	−11.7%
1991	88	−17.0%
2001	99	+12.5%
2011	107	+8.1%
2021	130	+21.5%

Source: Censuses

== Transport ==
There are no railways or major roads passing through the municipality. Lisov is served by the train station in neighbouring Hradec.

== Sights ==
There are no protected cultural monuments in the municipality.
