= Radbuza =

River in the Czech Republic

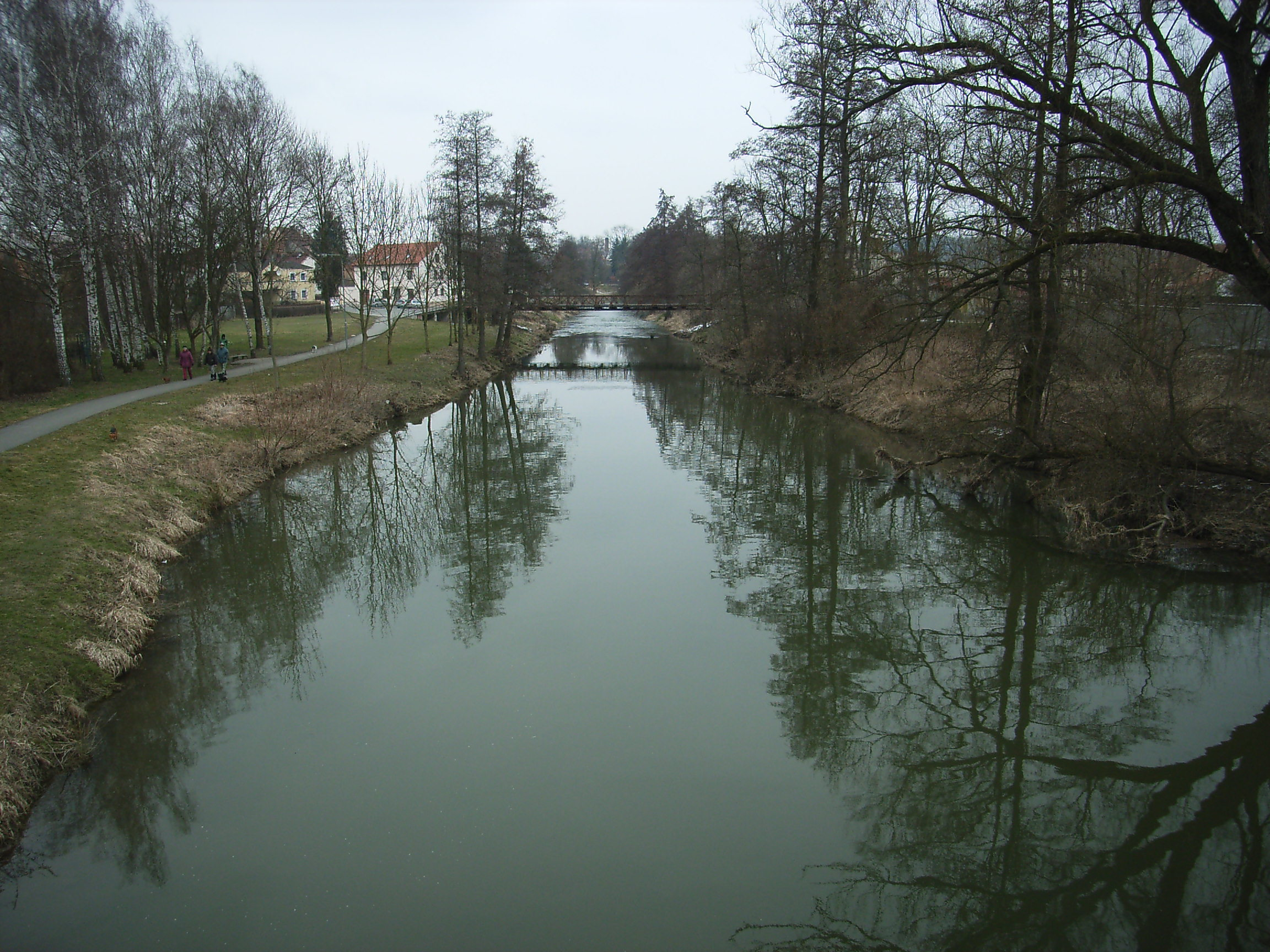
- The Radbuza in Staňkov

Location
- Country: Czech Republic
- Region: Plzeň

Physical characteristics
- Source
  - location: Rybník, Upper Palatine Forest
  - coordinates: 49°29′41″N 12°42′6″E
  - elevation: 689 m (2,260 ft)
- Mouth
  - location: Berounka
  - coordinates: 49°29′39″N 12°42′6″E
  - elevation: 301 m (988 ft)
- Length: 109.7 km (68.2 mi)
- Basin size: 2,189.6 km^{2} (845.4 sq mi)
- Discharge
  - average: 11.34 m^{3}/s (400 cu ft/s) near estuary

Basin features
- Progression: Berounka→ Vltava→ Elbe→ North Sea

The Radbuza (Czech pronunciation: [ˈradbuza]; German: Radbusa) is a river in the Czech Republic, the secondary source river of the Berounka River. It flows through the Plzeň Region. It is 109.7 km (68.2 mi) long, making it the 17th longest river in the Czech Republic.

== Etymology ==
The name is derived from the personal Slavic name Radbud. The land through which the river flows once belonged to someone of that name.

== Characteristic ==
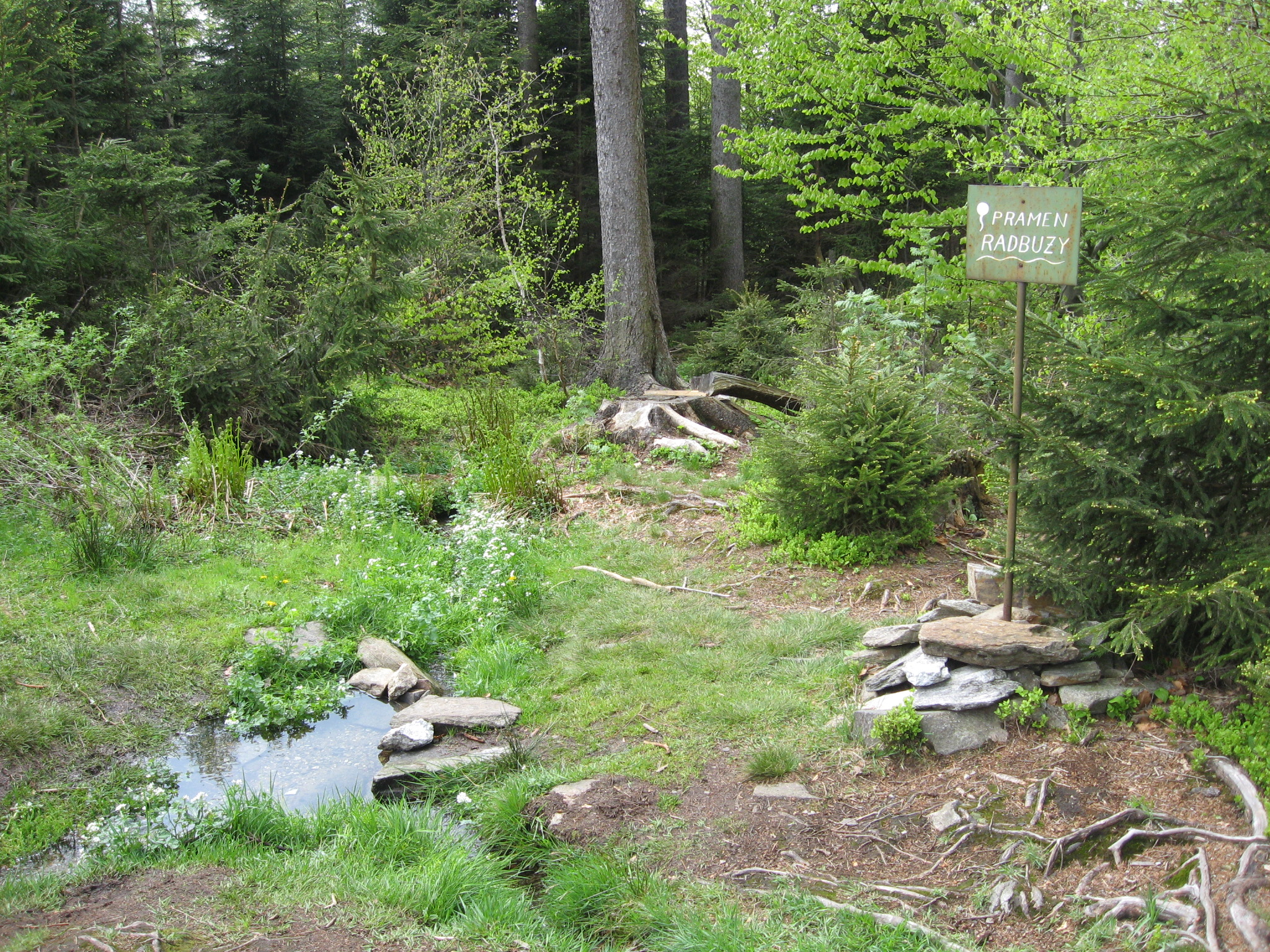
Spring of Radbuza

The Radbuza originates in the territory of Rybník in the Upper Palatine Forest at an elevation of 689 m (2,260 ft) and flows to Plzeň, where it joins the Mže at an elevation of 301 m (988 ft) and together they form the Berounka. It is 109.7 km (68.2 mi) long, making it the 17th longest river in the Czech Republic. Its drainage basin has an area of 2,189.6 km^{2} (845.4 sq mi), of which 7.3 km^{2} (2.8 sq mi) is in Germany.

The longest tributaries of the Radbuza are:

Tributary	Length (km)	River km	Side
Úhlava	104.0	4.6	right
Merklínka	39.4	34.8	right
Zubřina	33.2	53.0	right
Černý potok	28.3	66.9	right
Luční potok	16.9	9.1	left
Dnešický potok	13.9	28.3	right
Touškovský potok	13.8	39.6	left
Hořina	13.3	41.1	left
Chuchla	12.9	48.0	left
Srbický potok	12.6	48.5	right

== Course ==
The river flows through the municipal territories of Rybník, Bělá nad Radbuzou, Hostouň, Srby, Horšovský Týn, Křenovy, Staňkov, Holýšov, Hradec, Stod, Chotěšov, Vstiš and Dobřany before joining the Mže in Plzeň.

== Bodies of water ==
There are 154 bodies of water larger than 1 ha in the basin area. The largest of them and the only body of water built on the Radbuza is the České údolí Reservoir with an area of 151.5 ha (374 acres).

== Fauna ==
The river is home to a population of Eurasian beaver as well as nutria, which is a non-native species.

== Tourism ==
The Radbuza is suitable for river tourism. It belongs to the undemanding rivers suitable for beginner paddlers and is navigable for most of the year.
