= Staňkov (Domažlice District) =

- Town
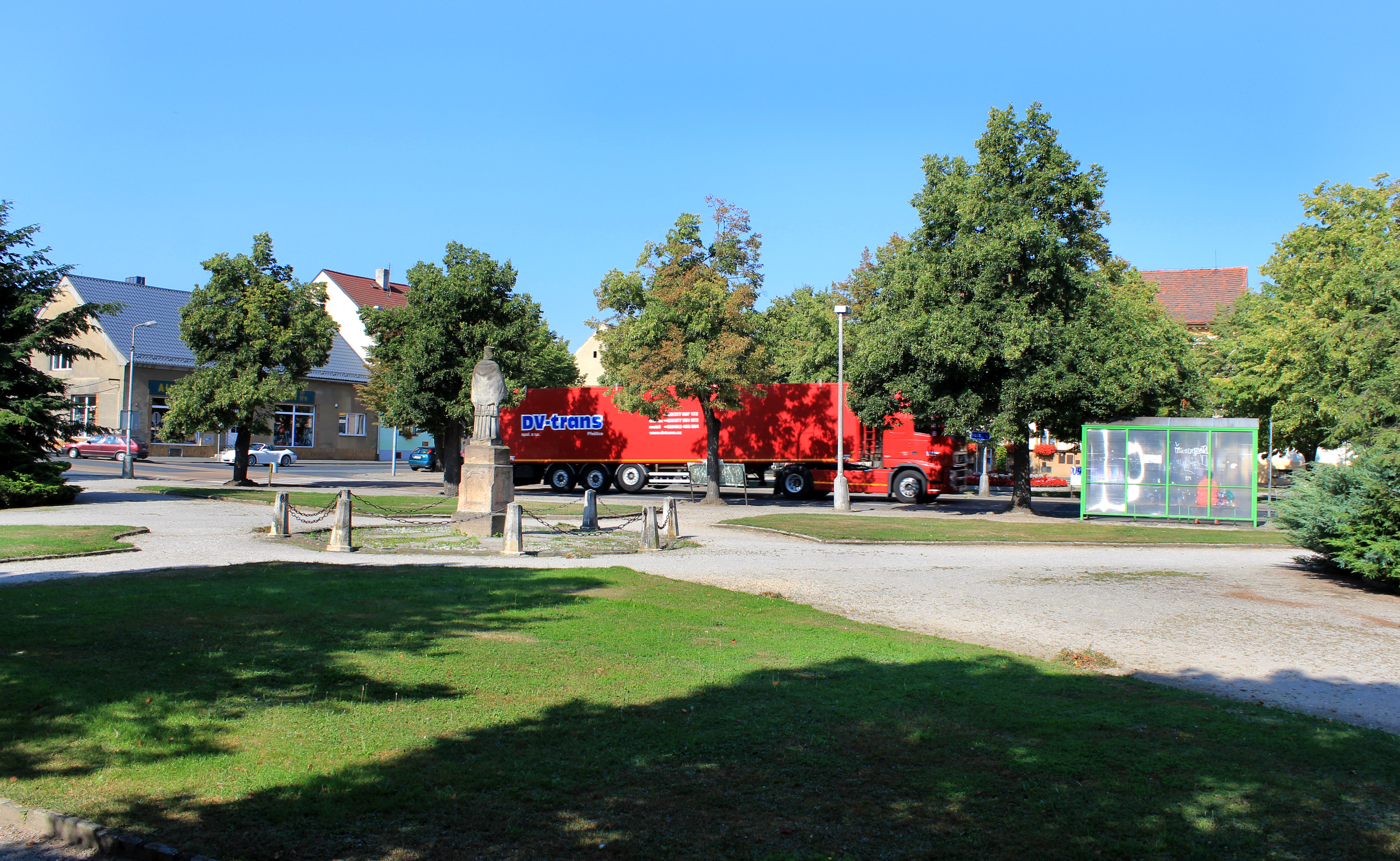
- Town square

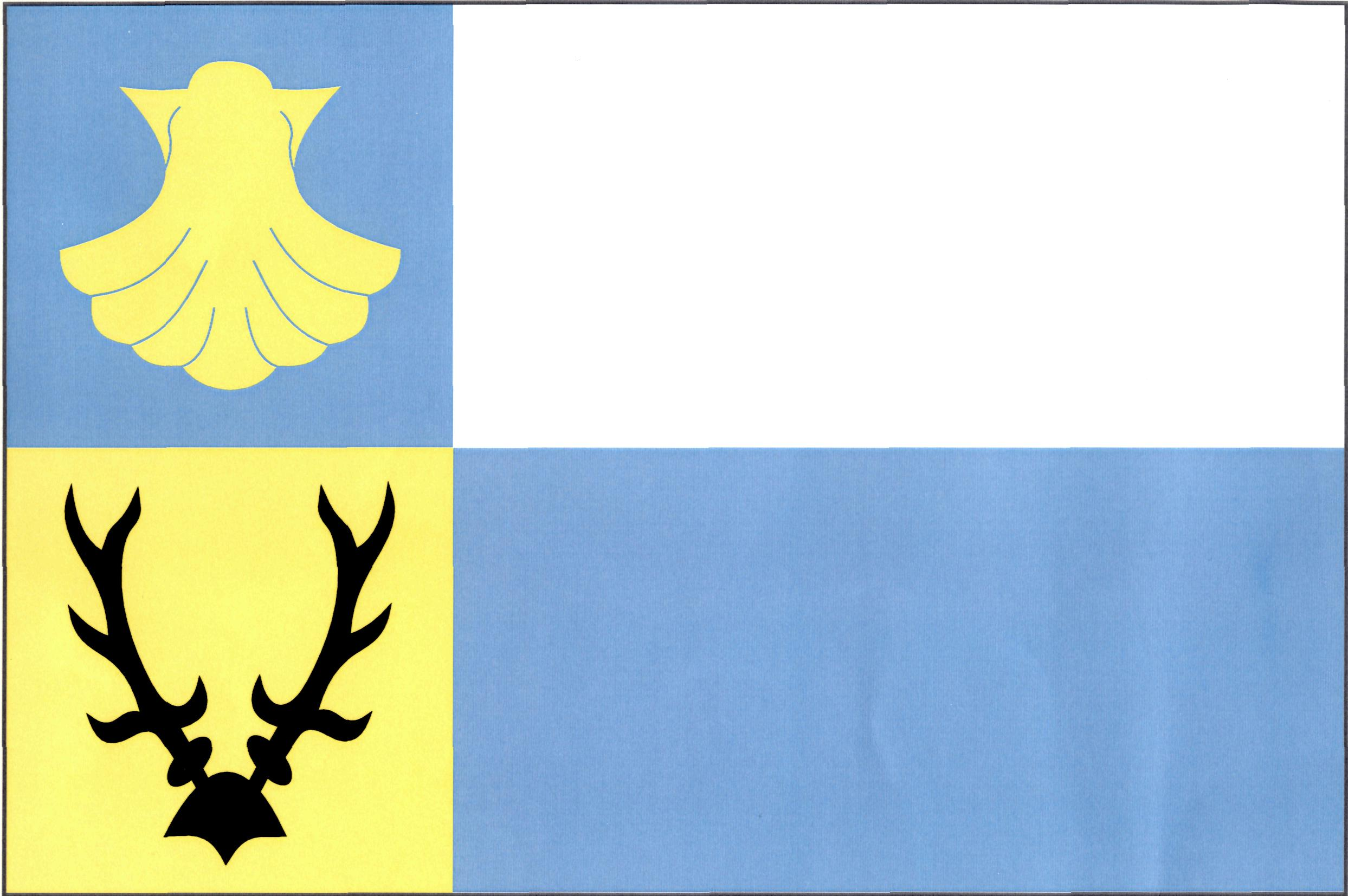
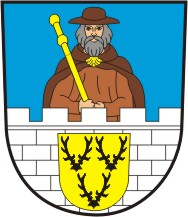
- Flag Coat of arms

- Location in the Czech Republic
- Coordinates: 49°33′14″N 13°4′15″E
- Country: Czech Republic
- Region: Plzeň
- District: Domažlice
- First mentioned: 1233

Government
  - Mayor: Alexandr Horák

Area
  - Total: 20.50 km^{2} (7.92 sq mi)
- Elevation: 387 m (1,270 ft)

Population (2026-01-01)
  - Total: 3,363
  - Density: 164.0/km^{2} (424.9/sq mi)
- Time zone: UTC+1 (CET)
  - Summer (DST): UTC+2 (CEST)
- Postal code: 345 61
- Website: www.mestostankov.cz

Staňkov (Czech pronunciation: [ˈstaɲkof]; German: Stankau) is a town in Domažlice District in the Plzeň Region of the Czech Republic. It has about 3,400 inhabitants. The town is located on the Radbuza River in the Plasy Uplands. The most important monument of Staňkov is the Church of Saint James the Great.

== Administrative division ==
Staňkov consists of five municipal parts (in brackets population according to the 2021 census):

- Staňkov I (1,504)
- Staňkov II (1,302)
- Krchleby (285)
- Ohučov (93)
- Vránov (147)

== Etymology ==
The name is derived from the personal name Staněk.

== Geography ==
Staňkov is located about 16 kilometres (10 mi) northeast of Domažlice and 28 km (17 mi) southwest of Plzeň. It lies in the Plasy Uplands. The highest point is the hill Holubí hlava at 475 m (1,558 ft) above sea level. The Radbuza River flows through the town.

== History ==
The first written mention of the village of Staňkov is from 1233. The market town of Staňkov was a separate settlement, first mentioned in 1367. In 1271, the village was sold to the Chotěšov Abbey and both the village and the market town were its property until 1425.

Staňkov village and Staňkov market town existed separately until 1938, when they were merged into one municipality. In 1960, Staňkov became a town.

== Demographics ==
Historical population

Year	Pop.	±%
1869	2,300	—
1880	2,760	+20.0%
1890	3,447	+24.9%
1900	4,068	+18.0%
1910	4,167	+2.4%

Year	Pop.	±%
1921	4,361	+4.7%
1930	4,865	+11.6%
1950	3,551	−27.0%
1961	3,609	+1.6%
1970	3,402	−5.7%

Year	Pop.	±%
1980	3,473	+2.1%
1991	3,199	−7.9%
2001	3,066	−4.2%
2011	3,279	+6.9%
2021	3,331	+1.6%

Source: Censuses

== Transport ==
The I/26 road from Plzeň to the Czech–German border in Česká Kubice runs through Staňkov.

Staňkov is located on the railway line Plzeň–Domažlice and is the starting point of a local line to Poběžovice.

== Sights ==
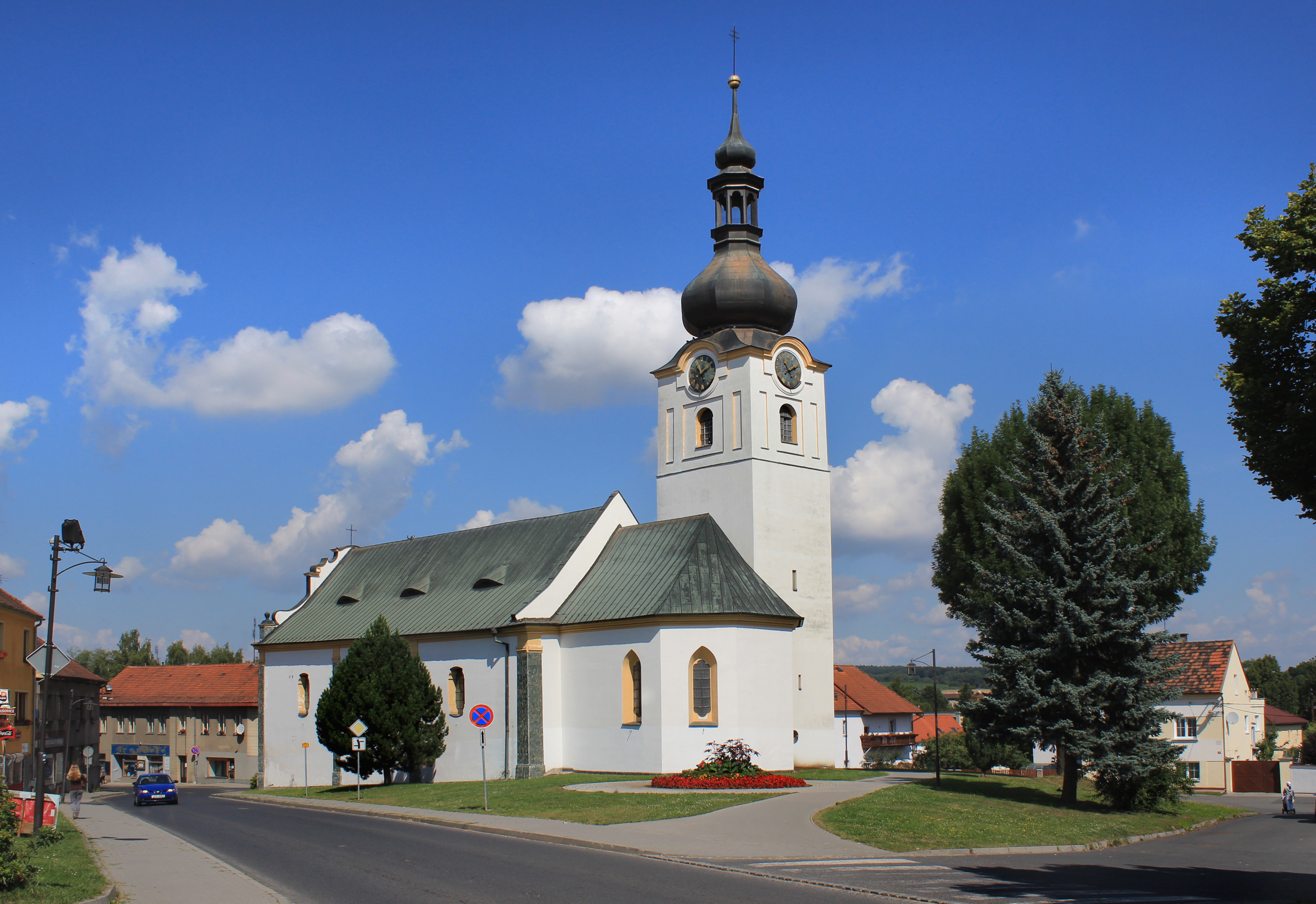
Church of Saint James the Great

The main landmark of Staňkov is the Church of Saint James the Great. It is originally a Gothic church from the 14th century. The tower was raised in 1673. Baroque modifications were made in 1738.

The town hall is a late Baroque building from the end of the 18th century, built after the old town hall from 1620 was destroyed by a fire in 1794. In the 19th and first half of the 20th century, the building was modified to its present form.

== Notable people ==
- Josef Mathauser (1846–1917), painter
