= Stod (Plzeň-South District) =

- Town
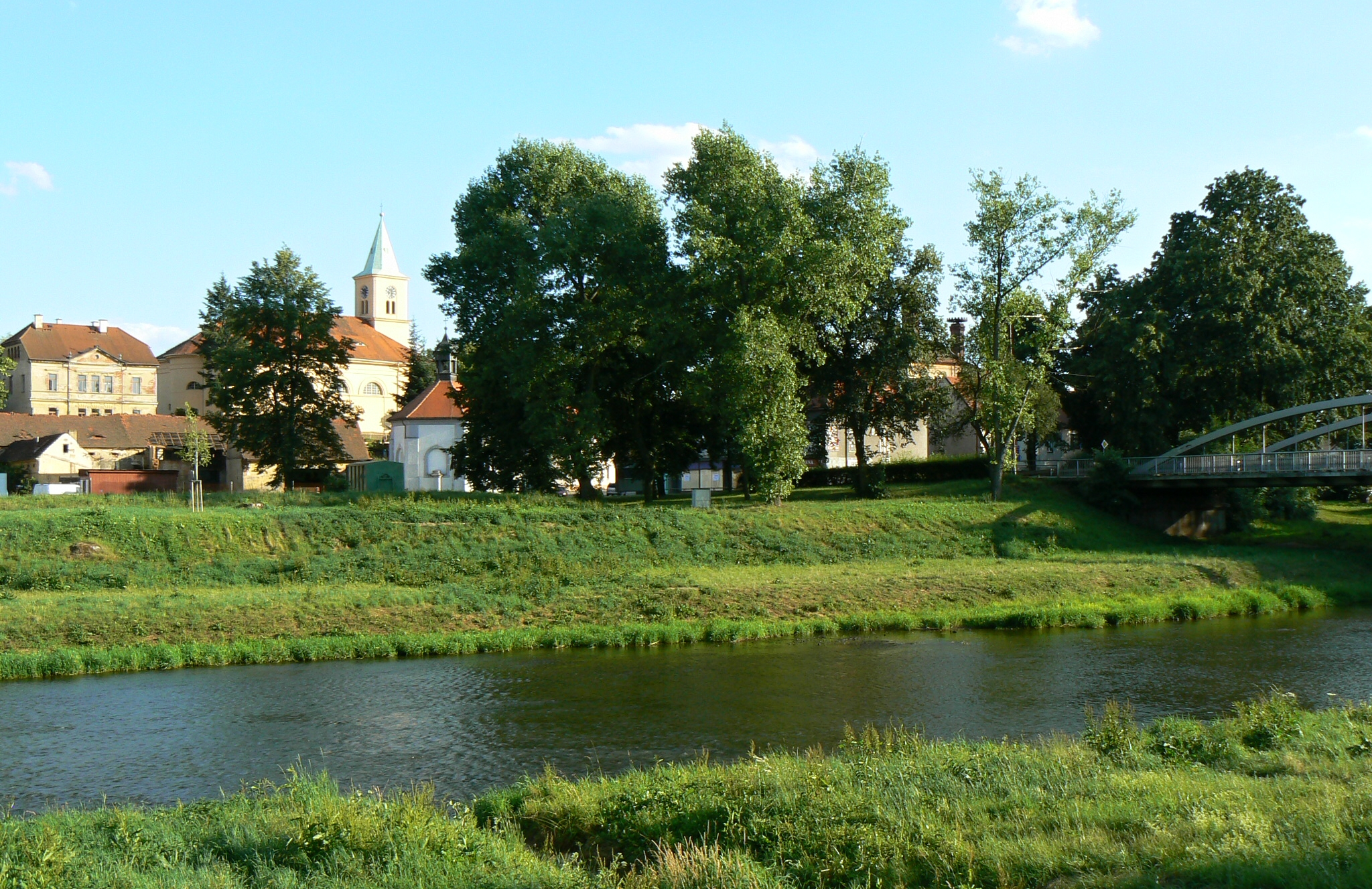
- Bank of the Radbuza River

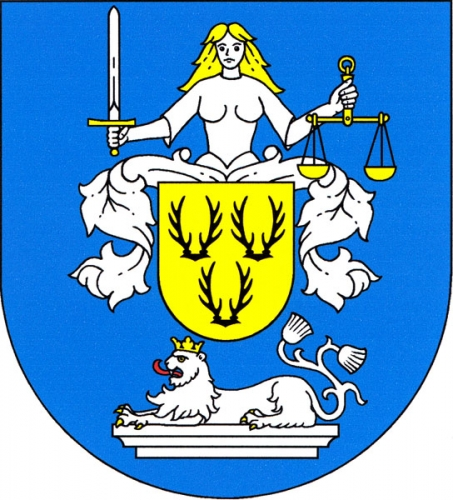
- Flag Coat of arms

- Location in the Czech Republic
- Coordinates: 49°38′21″N 13°9′53″E
- Country: Czech Republic
- Region: Plzeň
- District: Plzeň-South
- First mentioned: 1235

Government
  - Mayor: Jiří Vlk

Area
  - Total: 20.04 km^{2} (7.74 sq mi)
- Elevation: 337 m (1,106 ft)

Population (2026-01-01)
  - Total: 3,694
  - Density: 184.3/km^{2} (477.4/sq mi)
- Time zone: UTC+1 (CET)
  - Summer (DST): UTC+2 (CEST)
- Postal code: 333 01
- Website: www.mestostod.cz

Stod (Czech pronunciation: [ˈstot]; German: Staab) is a town in Plzeň-South District in the Plzeň Region of the Czech Republic. It has about 3,700 inhabitants. The town is located on the Radbuza River, on the border between the Plasy Uplands and Švihov Highlands.

Stod was founded in the 13th century at the latest and became a town in 1850. The most important monument in the town is the Church of Saint Mary Magdalene.

== Administrative division ==
Stod consists of two municipal parts (in brackets population according to the 2021 census):

- Stod (3,483)
- Lelov (97)

== Etymology ==
Although the village was ethnically Czech at the time of its foundation, the name probably originated from the Middle High German word stode (i.e. 'river bank') and referred to its location on the bank of the Radbuza River.

== Geography ==
Stod is located about 18 kilometres (11 mi) southwest of Plzeň. It lies on the border between the Plasy Uplands and Švihov Highlands. The highest point is a nameless hill at 460 m (1,509 ft) above sea level. The town is situated at the confluence of the Radbuza and Merklínka rivers.

== History ==
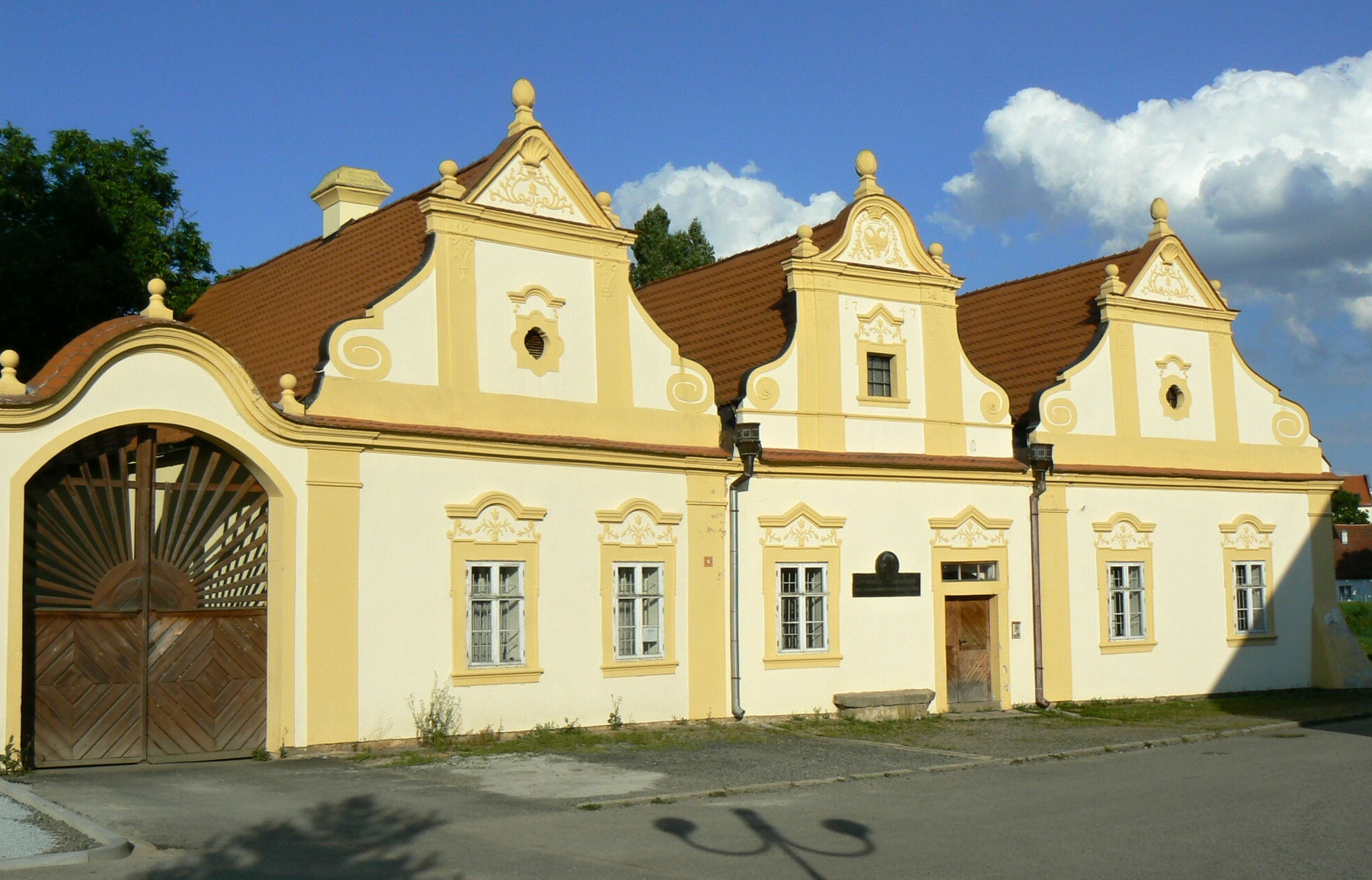
Old post office

The first written mention of Stod is from 1235, when King Wenceslaus I of Bohemia left the village to the Chotěšov Abbey. In 1315, John of Bohemia promoted the village to a market town. By the period of King Charles IV in 1363, the town acquired more privileges, such as a judiciary, the right to use a town seal, and to keep the town's books. In 1544 the town was granted the privilege of establishing a malt-house and a brewery. By 1547 there was a post office and in 1550 Ferdinand I allowed the town to stage an annual fair.

The market town was set back by the turmoil of the Thirty Years' War. By 1654, only about 230 residents remained in Stod. Consequently, tracts of land were distributed to German families from Bavaria to repopulate the region, which led to Germanisation of Stod. By 1850, Stod had grown to approximately 1,500 residents and was promoted to a town.

In 1863, a group of 83 people from Stod, led by the former military officer Martin Krippner, left to settle Puhoi in New Zealand.

In 1938, the town was annexed by Nazi Germany and administered as part of the Reichsgau Sudetenland. After World War II, most of the German population was expelled.

== Demographics ==
Historical population

| Year | Pop. | ±% |
|---|---|---|
| 1869 | 1,970 | — |
| 1880 | 2,196 | +11.5% |
| 1890 | 2,461 | +12.1% |
| 1900 | 2,682 | +9.0% |
| 1910 | 3,170 | +18.2% |

| Year | Pop. | ±% |
|---|---|---|
| 1921 | 3,164 | −0.2% |
| 1930 | 3,560 | +12.5% |
| 1950 | 2,854 | −19.8% |
| 1961 | 3,057 | +7.1% |
| 1970 | 3,442 | +12.6% |

| Year | Pop. | ±% |
|---|---|---|
| 1980 | 3,776 | +9.7% |
| 1991 | 3,674 | −2.7% |
| 2001 | 3,443 | −6.3% |
| 2011 | 3,801 | +10.4% |
| 2021 | 3,580 | −5.8% |

Source: Censuses

== Transport ==
Stod is located on the railway line Plzeň–Domažlice.

== Sport ==
The Prague–Plzeň–Regensburg cycle route passes through the town.

== Sights ==
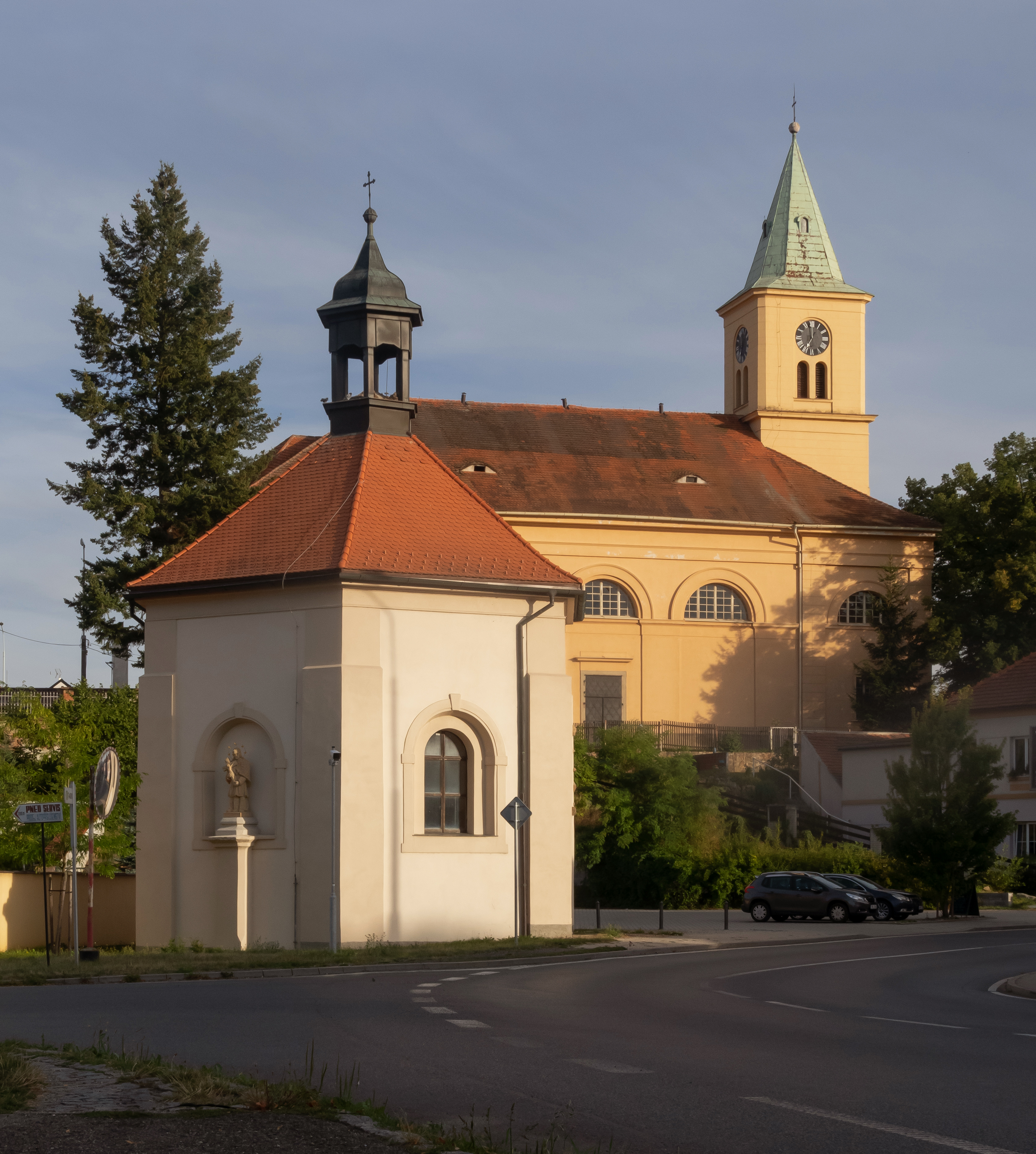
Chapel of Saint John of Nepomuk and Church of Saint Mary Magdalene

The main landmark of Stod is the Church of Saint Mary Magdalene. It was built in the Neoclassical style on the site of an older church in 1841–1843.

Near the church is the Chapel of Saint John of Nepomuk. It is a Baroque chapel from the early 18th century, which belonged to a now non-existent hospital.

== Notable people ==
- Arthur Salz (1881–1963), German sociologist and economist
- Ilona Uhlíková-Voštová (born 1954), table tennis player
- Pavel Soukup (born 1971), athlete
