= Martin Krippner =

Bohemian army officer

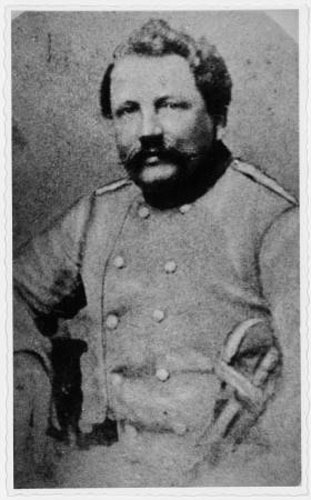
- Born: 23 September 1817; Mantov, Bohemia
- Died: 1 September 1894 (aged 76) Warkworth, New Zealand
- Branch: Army
- Service years: 1842–1859
- Rank: Captain
- Alma mater: Prague University
- Spouse: Emily Longdill (m. 1851–1890)
- Children: 4
- Other work: Postmaster; Headmaster

Martin Krippner (23 September 1817, Mantov – 31 January 1894) was a Bohemian-born Austrian Captain who led the settlement of Puhoi, New Zealand by German-speaking Bohemians from Stod in 1863.

== Career ==
Martin Krippner was the eldest son of Johannes Krippner, a blacksmith, and his wife, Anna Pallier. Martin received a better education than many of his social contemporaries and studied law at Prague University. In 1842 he obtained a commission in the Habsburg army and rose to the rank of captain. Whilst stationed at Frankfurt in Germany he met Emily Longdill, a well-educated Englishwoman. They married on 12 May 1851 and had four children. Martin resigned his military commission in 1859.

Emily Krippner's brother, Pynson Wilmot Longdill, had settled in New Zealand and it is believed that he encouraged the Krippners to emigrate there. The Krippner family arrived in Auckland on 22 March 1860 with Martin's brother Johannes (Hans) Krippner (and his future wife, Elizabeth Turnwald); and also the Pankratz and Scheidler families, also from Habsburg Bohemia.

Martin Krippner was naturalised a British citizen on 10 April 1860 and initially settled at Orewa, where he was postmaster from August 1861 until October 1863. Krippner was not a successful farmer himself but he was very keen about New Zealand's prospects and was on good terms with Governor-General of New Zealand Sir George Grey. Krippner soon thought up a project to help landless peasants back home in Bohemia and obtained permission from the Auckland provincial government to arrange a Bohemian colony at Puhoi. He then wrote to his brothers, still in Bohemia, promising 40 acres (160,000 m^{2}) of free land for each adult immigrant with a further 20 acres (81,000 m^{2}) for each child over five years of age.

The concept appealed immediately to entrepreneurial peasants from Krippner's native Mantau region. On 27 June 1863, 83 immigrants, including Martin's brother Michael Krippner, arrived at Auckland. They were transported to the mouth of the Puhoi River and taken upstream in Māori canoes to the site chosen by Krippner. The central European immigrants were initially appalled by the primitive state of the entirely undeveloped land, thick with native bush. Plots were allocated and the peasants started clearing the bush.

Krippner served as translator for the community for a long time and as such exercised quite a lot of influence. Soon after their arrival Krippner persuaded some of the men to join the Third Regiment of the Waikato Militia. Krippner was himself offered a commission as captain if he could get 50 men to enlist and the commission was granted on 17 October 1863. In 1864 Krippner and his Bohemian men guarded Māori prisoners being held in Auckland and at the conclusion of the war, some of the Bohemians accepted grants of land at Ohaupo in the Waikato Region. Krippner also received a land grant there but did not settle on it.

Krippner encouraged further Bohemian immigration in the hope that the colonial regime would reward him. Consequently, in 1866 a second group of Bohemians arrived and in 1873 a third and final bunch. Although Krippner lived at Orewa he kept a strong proprietorial interest in Puhoi and utilised his government contacts to secure money for roadworks in the area: this helped provide employment and immediate cash for the newcomers. Krippner often thought up additional economic sources of income: at his suggestion the Puhoi colonists gathered tanekaha (celery pine) bark for tanning and fungus for the Chinese export market.

In 1869 Emily Krippner started a school at Puhoi and by 1873 the Puhoi Educational District was legally constituted. Due to his fluency in both English and the German Egerlander dialect of the Bohemian settlers, Martin Krippner was appointed headmaster and Emily Krippner was made assistant teacher. Martin Krippner was postmaster at Silverdale from 1 July 1873 until 31 December 1874 and whilst in Puhoi held various offices. He was chairman of the Puhoi Highway District Board in 1874, and in 1877 and 1878 served on the Rodney County Council. A post office had been established at Puhoi in 1870 and Krippner was postmaster from 1 August 1875 until 30 June 1884.

By the early 1880s the Puhoi settlement was securely established and the confident settlers were more able to communicate their criticisms of Krippner's leadership. It became obvious that the Krippners, both in their 60s, were no longer capable of adequately performing their teaching duties and in 1884 the school committee petitioned to have them removed.

== Retirement and death ==
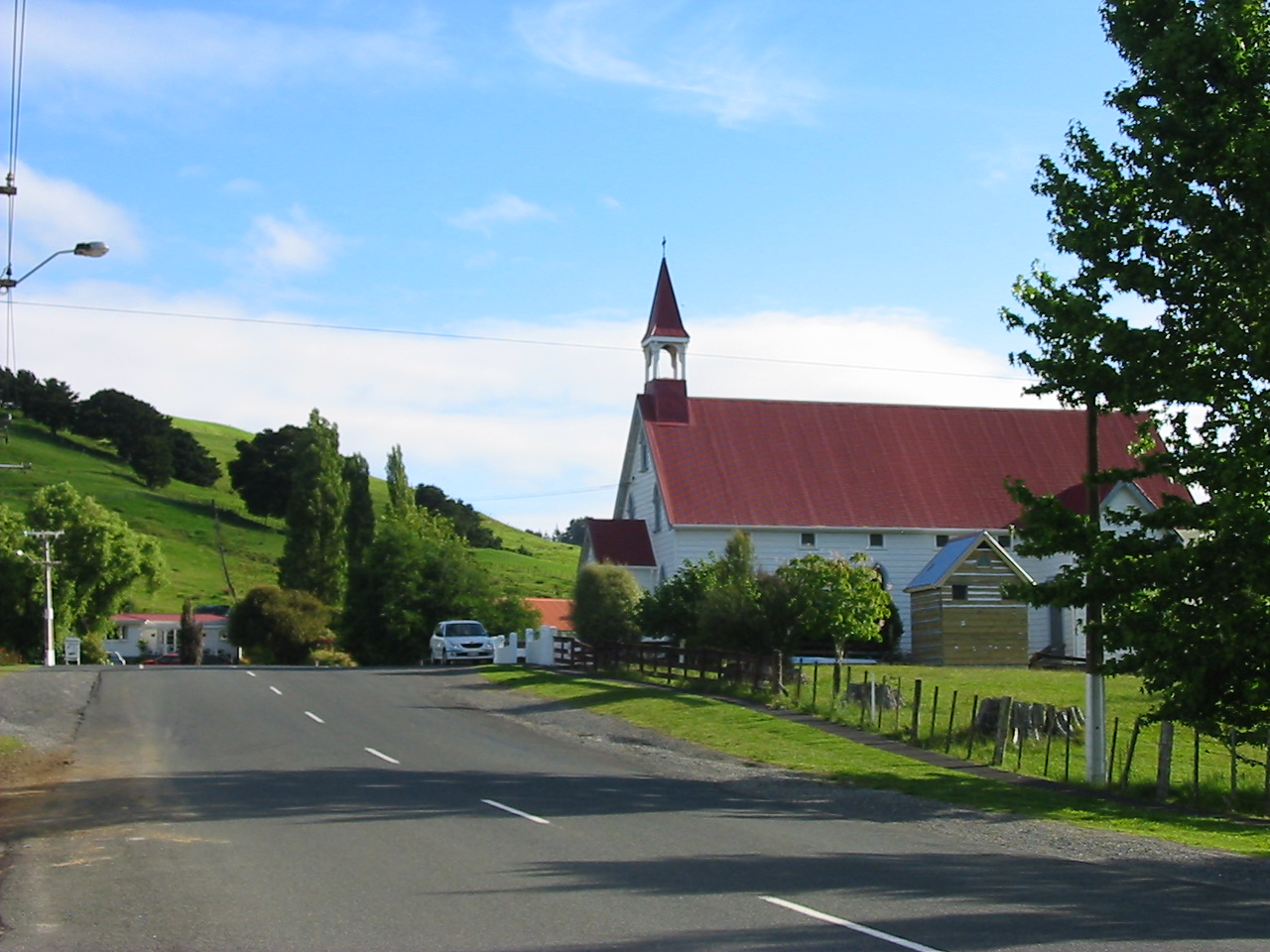
Puhoi Village

The Puhoi Bohemians showed their gratitude to Krippner by building a new house for him at Warkworth. Emily Krippner died there on 15 December 1890; Martin Krippner on 31 January 1894.
