= Rybník (Domažlice District) =

- Municipality
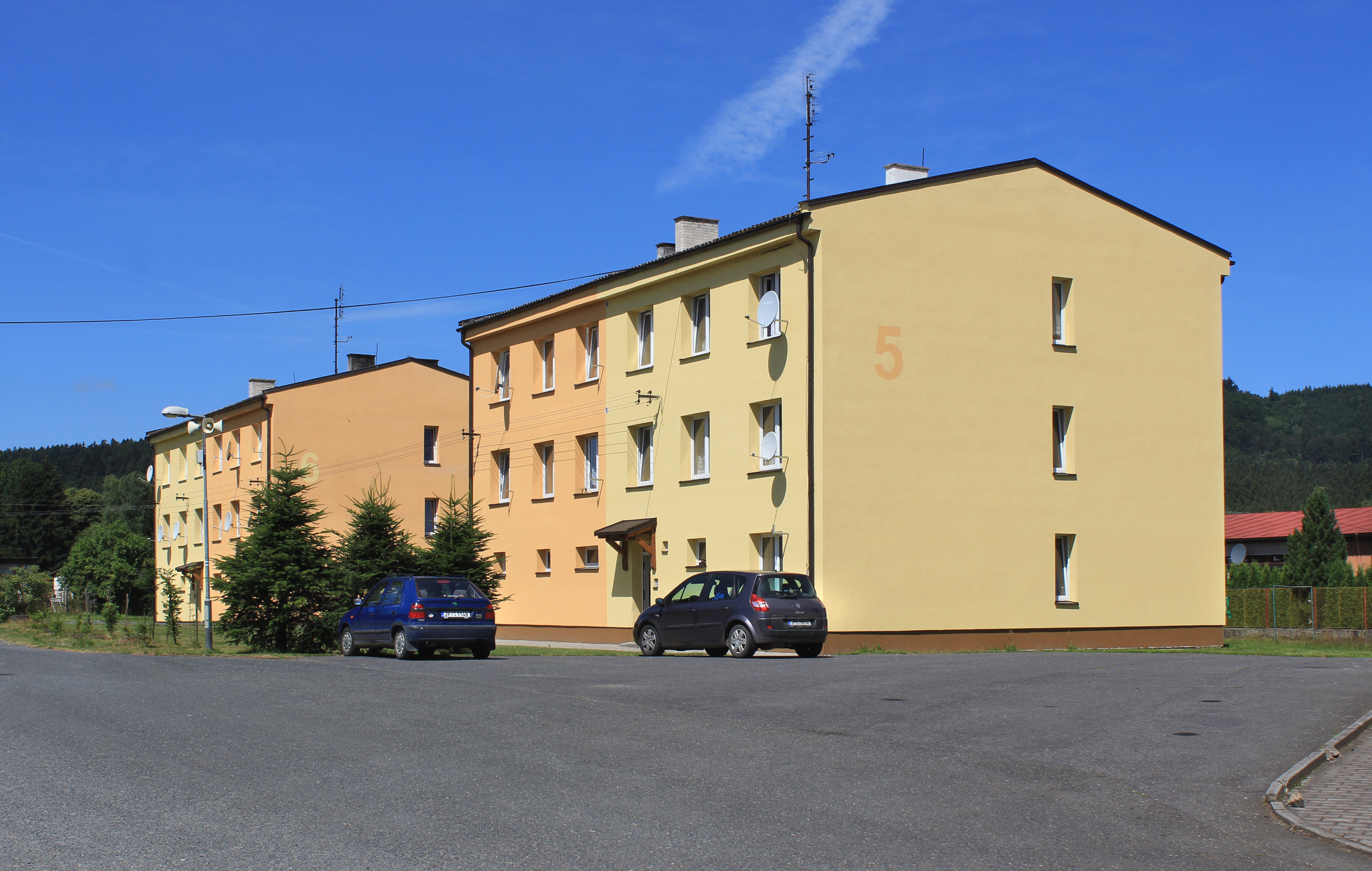
- Houses in the village

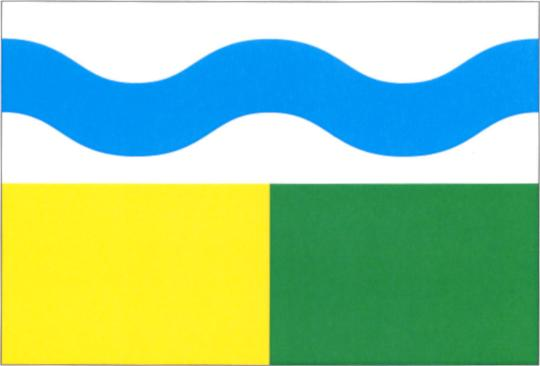
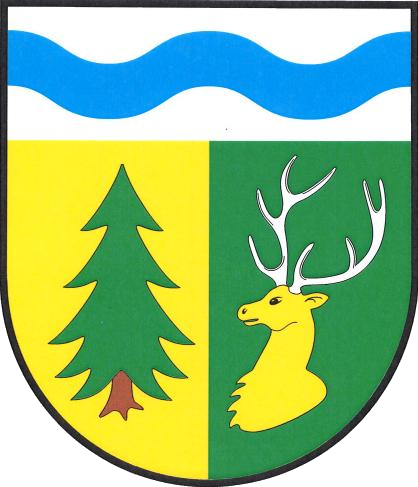
- Flag Coat of arms

- Location in the Czech Republic
- Coordinates: 49°30′46″N 12°40′36″E
- Country: Czech Republic
- Region: Plzeň
- District: Domažlice
- First mentioned: 1748

Area
  - Total: 36.49 km^{2} (14.09 sq mi)
- Elevation: 532 m (1,745 ft)

Population (2026-01-01)
  - Total: 158
  - Density: 4.33/km^{2} (11.2/sq mi)
- Time zone: UTC+1 (CET)
  - Summer (DST): UTC+2 (CEST)
- Postal code: 345 25
- Website: www.obec-rybnik.cz

Rybník (German: Waier) is a municipality and village in Domažlice District in the Plzeň Region of the Czech Republic. It has about 200 inhabitants.

== Administrative division ==
Rybník consists of four municipal parts (in brackets population according to the 2021 census):

- Rybník (151)
- Liščí Hora (0)
- Mostek (0)
- Závist (15)

== Geography ==
Rybník is located about 19 kilometres (12 mi) northwest of Domažlice and 54 km (34 mi) southwest of Plzeň, on the border with Germany. It lies in the Upper Palatine Forest. The highest point is the hill Velká skála at 792 m (2,598 ft) above sea level. The village is situated in the valley of the Radbuza River, which originates in the municipal territory.

== Demographics ==
Historical population
Year	Pop.	±%
1869	3,021	—
1880	3,030	+0.3%
1890	3,068	+1.3%
1900	3,158	+2.9%
1910	3,322	+5.2%
1921	3,365	+1.3%
1930	3,329	−1.1%
1950	143	−95.7%
1961	138	−3.5%
1970	168	+21.7%
1980	198	+17.9%
1991	169	−14.6%
2001	180	+6.5%
2011	181	+0.6%
2021	166	−8.3%
Source: Censuses
