= Lujo Brentano =

German economist and social reformer (1844–1931)

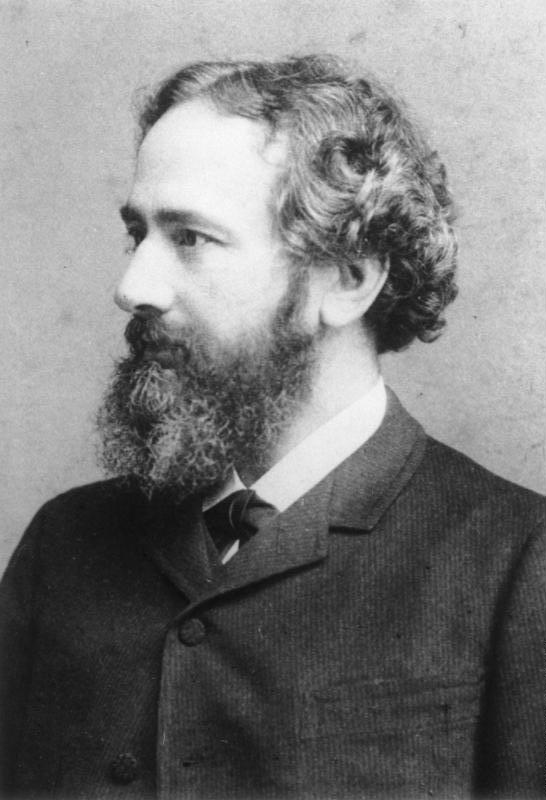
- Born: 18 December 1844; Aschaffenburg, Kingdom of Bavaria
- Died: 9 September 1931 (aged 86); Munich, Weimar Germany
- Education: Trinity College Dublin; Heidelberg University (Dr. iur.); University of Göttingen (Dr. rer. pol.)
- Scientific career
- Fields: Economist
- Workplaces: Royal University of Wrocław; Friedrich Wilhelm University of Berlin; University of Vienna; Leipzig University; Ludwig-Maximilians-Universität München
- Doctoral advisor: Johann von Helferich (Ph.D. advisor); Adolph Wagner (Dr. phil. hab. advisor)
- Doctoral students: Hans Ehrenberg; Tokuzō Fukuda; Werner Hegemann; Theodor Heuss; Robert René Kuczynski; Arthur Salz
- Other notable students: Oswald Spengler

Lujo Brentano (/brɛnˈtɑːnoʊ/; German: [bʁɛnˈtaːno]; 18 December 1844 – 9 September 1931) was a German economist and social reformer.

== Biography ==
Lujo Brentano, born in Aschaffenburg into a German Catholic intellectual family (originally of Italian descent), attended school in Augsburg and Aschaffenburg. He studied at Trinity College Dublin, the University of Münster, the Ludwig-Maximilians-Universität München, Heidelberg University (doctorate in law), the University of Würzburg, the University of Göttingen (doctorate in economics), and Friedrich Wilhelm University of Berlin (habilitation in economics, 1871).

He was a professor of economics and state sciences at the University of Breslau, the University of Strasbourg, the University of Vienna, Leipzig University, and most importantly, the Ludwig-Maximilians-Universität München (1891–1914). With Ernst Engel, the statistician, he made an investigation of the English trade unions.

In 1872, he became involved in an extended dispute with Karl Marx and Friedrich Engels. Brentano accused Marx of falsifying a quotation from an 1863 speech by William Ewart Gladstone.

In 1914, he signed the Manifesto of the Ninety-Three. After the revolution of November 1918, Brentano served in minister-president Kurt Eisner's government of the People's State of Bavaria as People's Commissar for Trade and Industry (Volkskommissar für Handel und Industrie) on 7 December 1918. He requested dismissal on 13 December and, after repeating his request, resigned on 16 December (a tenure of nine calendar days).

Brentano died in Munich in 1931, aged 86.

== Legacy ==
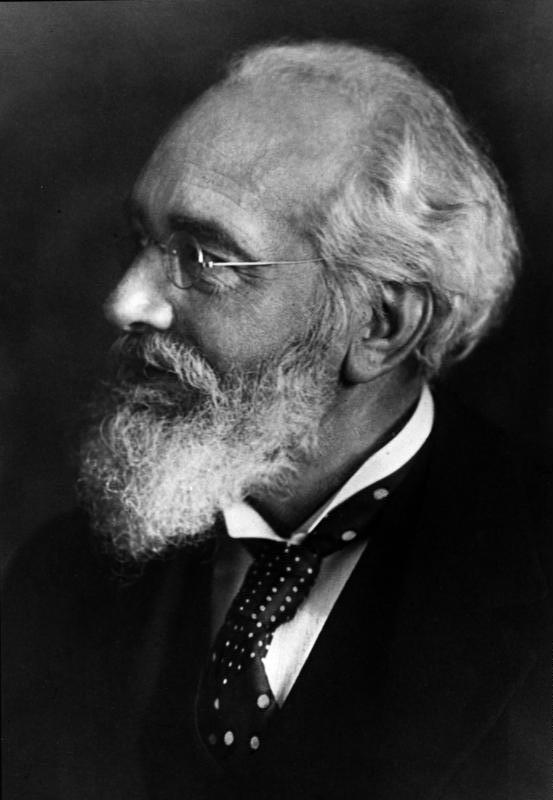
Lujo Brentano in 1927

Brentano was a Kathedersozialist, a professor advocating social reform, and a founding member of the Verein für Socialpolitik. He influenced the social market economy and many Germans who were leaders immediately after the end of World War II. He also influenced later economists, such as his doctoral student Arthur Salz.

== Bibliography ==
- Brentano, Lujo (1871–72). Die Arbeitergilden der Gegenwart. 2 vols., Leipzig: Duncker und Humblot. (English: On the History and Development of Gilds and the Origins of Trade Unions. 1870.)
- Brentano, Lujo (1901). Ethik und Volkswirtschaft in der Geschichte. November 1901. München: Wolf.
- Brentano, Lujo (1910). "The Doctrine of Malthus and the Increase of Population During the Last Decades." Economic Journal vol. 20(79), pp. 371–93.
- Brentano, Lujo (1923). Der wirtschaftende Mensch in der Geschichte. Leipzig: Meiner. Reprint Marburg: Metropolis, 200ß.
- Brentano, Lujo (1924). Wege zur Verständigung - Der Judenhass. Berlin, Philo Verlag und Buchhandlung
- Brentano, Lujo (1927–29). Eine Geschichte der wirtschaftlichen Entwicklung Englands. 4 vols., Jena: Gustav Fischer.
- Brentano, Lujo (1929). Das Wirtschaftsleben der antiken Welt. Jena: Fischer.
- Brentano, Lujo (1931). Mein Leben im Kampf um die soziale Entwicklung Deutschlands. Jena: Diederichs. Reprint Marburg: Metropolis, 2004.
- Brentano, Lujo (1924). Konkrete Bedingungen der Volkswirtschaft. Leipzig: Meiner. 1924. Reprint Marburg: Metropols, 2003.
- Brentano, Lujo (1877–1924). Der tätige Mensch und die Wissenschaft von der Wirtschaft. Reprint Marburg: Metropolis, 2006.
- Essays, including "The Industrialist".
