= Bad Company (2002 film) =

2002 film

- Theatrical release poster
- Directed by: Joel Schumacher
- Screenplay by: Jason Richman; Michael Browning
- Story by: Gary M. Goodman; David Himmelstein
- Produced by: Jerry Bruckheimer; Mike Stenson
- Starring: Anthony Hopkins; Chris Rock; Gabriel Macht
- Cinematography: Dariusz Wolski
- Edited by: Mark Goldblatt; Robert Lambert
- Music by: Trevor Rabin
- Production companies: Touchstone Pictures; Jerry Bruckheimer Films; Stillking Productions
- Distributed by: Buena Vista Pictures Distribution
- Release date: June 7, 2002
- Running time: 117 minutes
- Countries: United States; Czech Republic
- Language: English
- Budget: $70 million
- Box office: $66 million

Bad Company is a 2002 action comedy film directed by Joel Schumacher, produced by Jerry Bruckheimer and starring Chris Rock and Anthony Hopkins. The film tells the story of a street-wise hustler whose twin brother, a Harvard-educated CIA agent, is killed during an operation. The agency recruits him to finish the mission his brother was working on and sends in an experienced agent to train him.

The film became somewhat famous for its connections to the September 11th attacks. The film plot, written years before the attacks, involved a variety of Serbo-Balkan extremists (including a man from Afghanistan) planning a huge attack in New York City. The film's release date was moved out of its late 2001 spot and into a summer 2002 release, similar to several other films with terrorism or violent crime-related stories, including Collateral Damage.

It was released by Buena Vista Pictures Distribution on June 7, 2002, in the United States to negative reviews from critics. The film grossed $66 million against a $70 million budget.

== Plot ==
When a mission to retrieve a stolen suitcase bomb goes awry, CIA agent Kevin Pope is killed. Pope was working undercover as an antiquities dealer under the name Michael Turner. The CIA, which is desperate to complete the mission, discovers that Agent Pope had a twin brother, Jake Hayes, from whom he was separated at birth; their mother died giving birth and Hayes suffered from a severe lung infection that prompted the doctors to separate them because they felt that Hayes was unlikely to live for very long. Hayes hustles chess games, scalps tickets, and works at small clubs in Jersey City, New Jersey, to make ends meet. Meanwhile, Hayes's girlfriend, Julie grows tired of waiting for him to grow up and decides to move to Seattle, Washington.

After the CIA successfully persuades Hayes to participate and begins to train Hayes for a mission that is to take place in Prague, Czech Republic, they are initially dismayed by his lack of refinement. Agent Gaylord Oakes confronts Hayes, telling him he does not trust him. When Hayes begins paying attention, the CIA sets him up in his brother's old apartment in Manhattan to test him and try to bait the men who killed his brother. Hayes is attacked, but escapes unharmed. Looking for a way out, Hayes goes to his foster mother only to be found by Oakes, who persuades him to finish the mission.

After arriving in Prague, Hayes – posing as his dead brother – meets with the men selling the suitcase bomb. The seller, Adrik Vas is an ex-Russian Army Colonel with ties to the Russian Mafia. When they return to their hotel, Hayes is greeted by his brother's ex-girlfriend Nicole. Believing Hayes is his brother, she dines with him and returns to his hotel, where the couple is ambushed by rival buyers. Nicole figures out that Hayes is not his brother and returns to her assignment covering the Balkans for CNN.

Hayes and Oakes meet with Vas and are able to steal the arming codes. Just as they close the deal, Vas' men double cross them with the rival buyer. When the rival dealers, who are part of a multi-national terrorist organization, learn they cannot detonate the bomb because of the missing codes, they kidnap Julie. Hayes gives himself up trying to save his girlfriend, and the terrorists get the codes back and arm the bomb.

After interrogating one of the captured terrorists, they track the bomb to Grand Central Station. With the clock ticking, they locate the bomb and the terrorist leader Dragan Ađanić, who has started the countdown. Oakes rescues Hayes by killing two terrorists. As Hayes starts to enter the codes to disarm the bomb, Ađanić holds Julie hostage. To distract Ađanić, Hayes pretends to shoot Oakes, and they kill Ađanić by shooting him repeatedly. Hayes is able to disarm the bomb just prior to detonation.

Hayes visits his brother's grave. Later, Oakes approaches Hayes at his wedding to Julie and warns him that a dangerous criminal has escaped from prison and is seeking revenge on Kevin Pope, but since Kevin is dead and Hayes was impersonating him, the criminal thinks Hayes is Kevin. Hayes begins to panic and demands that Oakes protect him, but Oakes laughs as he reveals that it was only a joke and he really just came for the wedding.

== Cast ==
- Anthony Hopkins as CIA Agent Gaylord Oakes
- Chris Rock as Jake Hayes / CIA Agent Kevin Pope / Michael Turner
- Peter Stormare as Adrik Vas
- Gabriel Macht as CIA Agent Seale
- Kerry Washington as Julie Benson
- Adoni Maropis as Jarma / Dragan Henchman No. 1
- Garcelle Beauvais as Nicole
- Matthew Marsh as Dragan Ađanić
- Dragan Mićanović as Michelle "The Hammer" Petrov
- John Slattery as CIA Deputy Director Roland Yates
- Brooke Smith as CIA Agent Swanson
- Daniel Sunjata as CIA Agent Carew
- DeVone Lawson Jr. as CIA Agent Parish
- Wills Robbins as CIA Agent McCain
- Marek Vašut as Andre
- Irma P. Hall as Mrs. Banks
- Dan Ziskie as CIA Agent Dempsey
- John Aylward as CIA Agent Ferren
- John Fink as CIA Agent Fink
- Michael Ealy as "G-Mo"
- Shea Whigham as CIA Agent Wells (uncredited)
- Charlie Day as Stoner (uncredited)

== Production ==
In September 2000 it was announced action-comedy then titled Black Sheep had been greenlit with Jerry Bruckheimer to produce and the script written by professional musician turned screenwriter Jason Richman in his first studio job. Richman was hired to re-write Black Sheep after executives were impressed with his spec script Revolver with Richman's re-writes credited with getting the film greenlit. Jon Turteltaub was announced as being interested in directing. In January 2001, it was announced Joel Schumacher would direct the film. When questioned about the unusual pairing of leads Chris Rock and Anthony Hopkins, Bruckheimer stated:

We always try and have an interesting and unusual pairing of actors, and this is about as creative as you can get

In a statement to Entertainment Weekly, Rock said the title change from Black Sheep to Bad Company was to avoid confusion with the 1996 film of the same name starring Chris Farley and David Spade. Rock also jokingly referred to the film as Beverly Hills Spy.

The film was executive produced by Lary Simpson, the brother of Bruckheimer's longtime partner Don Simpson.

Bad Company was partially filmed in Prague, Czech Republic and in New York City. The scene where the suitcase bomb was handed over was filmed at Chotěšov Abbey.

== Release ==
The film was originally slated to be released on December 25, 2001, but because of the attacks of September 11, 2001, its release was postponed to June 7, 2002, given that the film was about a terrorist attack on New York City.

=== Home media ===
Bad Company was released on DVD and VHS on November 12, 2002. The film's DVD version is THX certified, featuring a DTS audio track and a documentary.

== Reception ==
=== Box office ===
Bad Company only collected a total of $11 million at the box office in its opening weekend, ranking fourth below The Sum of All Fears, Divine Secrets of the Ya-Ya Sisterhood and Star Wars: Episode II – Attack of the Clones. In the United Kingdom, the film made an opening weekend gross of just $593,059, ranking in sixth place behind Scooby-Doo, Minority Report, Spider-Man, Resident Evil and Devdas. It failed to recoup its budget at the box office, earning only $30,160,161 in the United States and $35,817,134 outside the US for a worldwide total of $65,977,295.

Reflecting on the film’s commercial failure, producer Jerry Bruckheimer said: “I think it was something I call a ‘tweener’. It didn’t have enough comedy to be a comedy and it didn’t have enough action to be an action movie, and it just kind of fell in the middle. It was a very entertaining movie and just didn’t capture the audience’s imagination. That’s just the way it is.”

=== Critical response ===
Bad Company was panned by critics. Review aggregation website Rotten Tomatoes gives the film a 10% approval rating based on 135 reviews, with an average score of 3.90/10. The site's critical consensus states: "Chris Rock and Anthony Hopkins fail to generate the sparks necessary to save the movie from a generic and utterly predictable script." Metacritic gave the film a score of 37 out of 100, based on 33 critics, indicating "generally unfavorable" reviews. Audiences surveyed by CinemaScore gave the film a grade of "B" on scale of A+ to F.

Seattle Post-Intelligencer reviewer William Arnold called the film "wildly overproduced, inadequately motivated every step of the way and demographically targeted to please every one (and no one)." Michael Sragow of The Baltimore Sun gave the film a one star rating, stating that "Bad Company is about an undercover brother, but it will never be confused with Undercover Brother." Roger Ebert remarks in the Chicago Sun-Times that the film "jams too many prefabricated story elements into the running time." On their review show, Ebert and Richard Roeper gave it two thumbs down, arguing it "might have been considered original, had it been made before 48 Hrs., Lethal Weapon and Rush Hour and every other action movie about a racially mixed pair of partners who initially despise each other, but learn to, well, you know the whole drill." Rene Rodriguez of The Miami Herald gave the film a one out of four scoring, explaining that "Schumacher bungles the action sequences as badly as he bungled Batman & Robin, and he pushes the violence to the limits of the PG-13 rating."

David Hunter of The Hollywood Reporter noted the film as having "all the familiar Bruckheimer elements, and Schumacher does probably as good a job as anyone at bringing off the Hopkins/Rock collision of acting styles and onscreen personas."

== Soundtrack ==
A soundtrack containing hip hop, alternative, and R&B music was released on June 4, 2002, by Hollywood Records. It peaked at number 98 on the Billboard 200 and number 11 on the Top R&B/Hip-Hop Albums.
