= Arthur Salz =

German professor of sociology and economics

Arthur Salz (German: [zalts]; 31 December 1881 – 10 August 1963) was a German professor of sociology and economics who wrote on mercantilism, imperialism, and power. He taught at Heidelberg University before being forced to flee Germany because of his Jewish faith. He was familiar with the Stefan George circle and married Sophie Kantorowicz, the sister of historian Ernst Kantorowicz.

== Life ==
Salz was born on 31 December 1881 in Staab, Bohemia, to Heinrich Salz and Rosa (née Popper). After completing gymnasium in Plzeň, Salz studied economics at the Friedrich Wilhelm University of Berlin, where he attended the lectures of Georg Simmel. He later studied at the Ludwig-Maximilians-Universität München and Heidelberg University, where he befriended Friedrich Gundolf and came in contact with the Stefan George circle. He remained in contact with Stefan George until 1925. He was also a regular guest in the home of Max Weber. Salz completed his dissertation in 1903 under Lujo Brentano, earning a doctorate in political science (Doctor Rerum Politicarum). Salz ran his family's business in Staab for a short time thereafter.

Salz was the co-editor of Heidelberger Studien aus dem Institut für Sozial- und Staatswissenschaft and lectured at the Handelshochschule in Mannheim and at the Akademie der Arbeit in Frankfurt. In 1907, Salz took on a position as a lecturer at Heidelberg University. After further studies at the University of Vienna and Charles University in Prague, Salz completed his post-doctoral work (habilitation) in 1909, entitled "Wallenstein als Merkantilist" ("Wallenstein as a Mercantilist"). He became an assistant professor at Heidelberg University in 1916.

In 1912, Salz married Sophie Kantorowicz, the sister of historian Ernst Kantorowicz. They had three children, Beate, Judith, and Henry.

Salz served in the Austro-Hungarian army during World War I. He held a post as an economic adviser to Djemal Pascha, an assignment which took him to Constantinople and Damascus and awakened Salz's interest in Islam although he himself was a religious Jew.

During the Nazi regime in Germany, Salz, as a Jew, was forced in 1933 to leave his position at Heidelberg University. He lived in England for one year, as a guest professor at the University of Cambridge. In 1934, he immigrated to the USA and became a professor at Ohio State University. He never returned to Germany.

Salz died on 10 August 1963 in Worthington, Ohio, at the age of 81.

== Publications (selected) ==
=== Books ===
- Beiträge zur Geschichte und Kritik der Lohnfondstheorie, Stuttgart: Cotta, 1905.
- Geschichte der böhmischen Industrie in der Neuzeit, Munich: Duncker & Humblot, 1913.
- Für die Wissenschaft gegen die Gebildeten unter ihren Verächtern, Munich: Drei Masken Verlag, 1921.
- Macht und Wirtschaftsgesetz: Ein Beitrag zur Erkenntnis des Wesens der kapitalistischen Wirtschaftsverfassung, Leipzig: B.G. Teubner, 1930.
- Das Wesen des Imperialismus: Umrisse einer Theorie, Leipzig: B.G. Teubner, 1931.

=== Articles ===
- "Wallenstein als Merkantilist", Mitteilungen des Vereins für Geschichte der Deutschen in Böhmen 47(4) (1909): 433-461.
- "Anmerkungen zu Werner Somberts »HOCHKAPITALISMUS«. Zeitschrift für die gesamte Staatswissenschaft / Journal of Institutional and Theoretical Economics 85(1) (1928): 21-53.
- "Die Zukunft des Imperialismus", Weltwirtschaftliches Archiv 32 (1930): 317-348.
- "Economic Liberalism Reinterpreted." Social Research 8(3) (Sept. 1941): 373-389.
- "The Present Position of Economics." American Economic Review 34(1) (1944): 15-24.
- "The Metamorphosis of Power." Synopsis: Festgabe für Alfred Weber (1948): 459-476.
- "A Note from a Student of Simmel’s." In Kurt Wolff (ed.) Georg Simmel 1858-1918 (1959): 233-236.

== Sources ==
- Wittebur, Klemens. Die Deutsche Soziologie im Exil. 1933–1945, Münster; Hamburg: Lit., 1991 (Dissertationsschrift von 1989). Starting at page 71.
- Schönhärl, Korinna. (2009). Wissen und Visionen. Theorie und Politik der Ökonomen im Stefan George-Kreis. Berlin.
- Fried, Johannes. Zwischem "Geheimem Deutschland" und "geheimer Akademie der Arbeit". Der Wirtschaftswissenschaftler Arthur Salz. In: Barbara Schlieben (Ed.), Geschichtsbilder im George-Kreis: Wege zur Wissenschaft. Göttingen: 2004. 249-302.
- Strauss, H. A., Röder, W., Rosenblatt, B., and Caplan, H. (1983). "Salz, Arthur." International Biographical Dictionary of Central European émigrés 1933-1945. Vol. 2. p. 1015.
