= Puhoi =

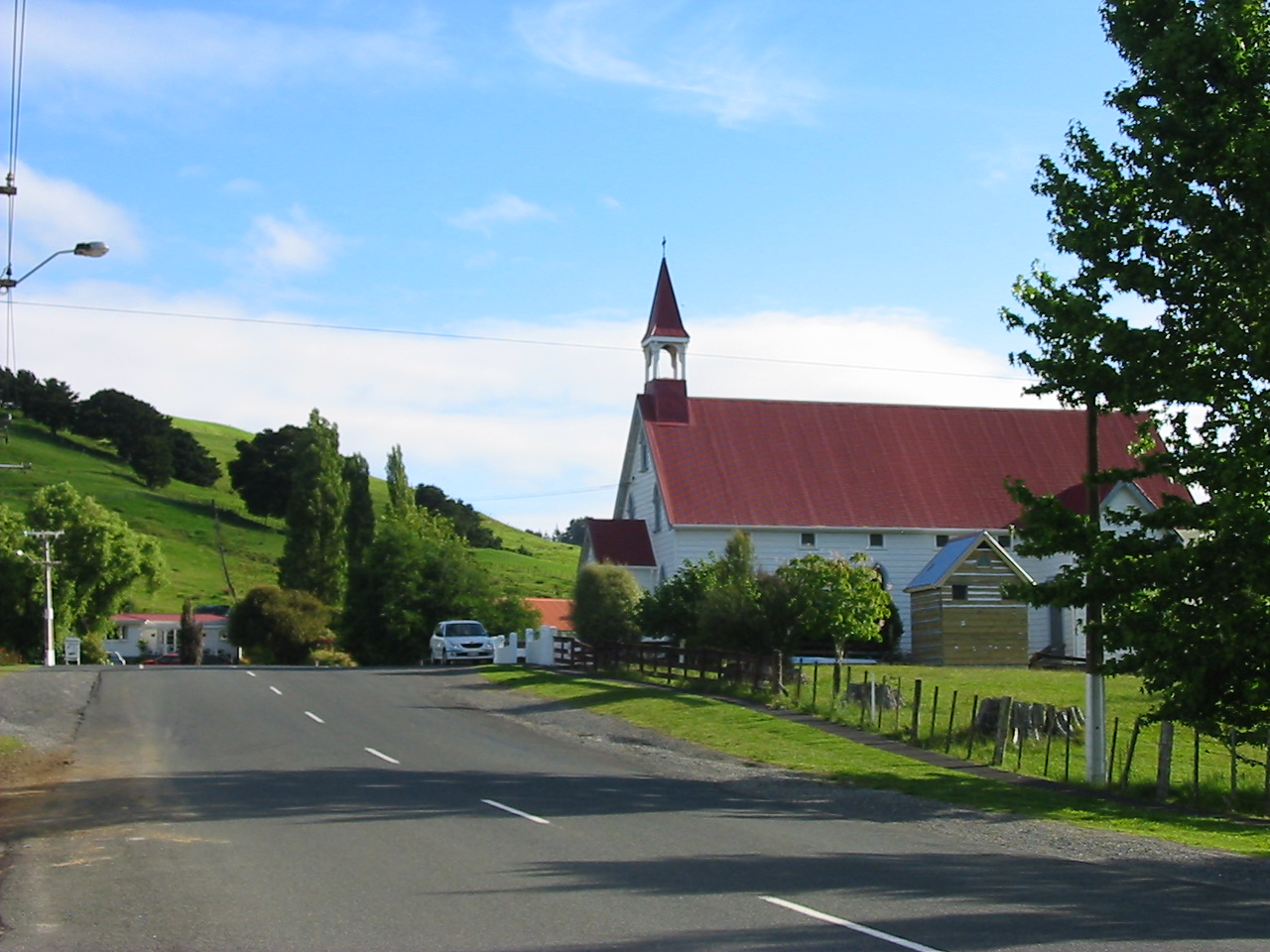
- Puhoi Village
- Interactive map of Puhoi
- Coordinates: 36°30′53″S 174°39′44″E
- Country: New Zealand
- Region: Auckland Region
- Ward: Rodney ward
- Local board: Rodney Local Board
- Subdivision: Warkworth subdivision
- Electorates: Kaipara ki Mahurangi; Te Tai Tokerau

Government
  - Territorial Authority: Auckland Council
  - Mayor of Auckland: Wayne Brown
  - Kaipara ki Mahurangi MP: Chris Penk
  - Te Tai Tokerau MP: Mariameno Kapa-Kingi

Area
  - Total: 3.59 km^{2} (1.39 sq mi)

Population (June 2025)
  - Total: 400
  - Density: 110/km^{2} (290/sq mi)

Puhoi is a village in New Zealand, located on the banks of the Puhoi River. The settlement was founded by German Bohemian immigrants in the 1860s. Puhoi has several historic buildings and part of the village is designated as a protected heritage area.

== Etymology ==
The name Puhoi means 'slow water' in the Māori language. The name presumably comes from the fact that the Puhoi River was quite slow when travelling upstream. Māori did not refer to the area around the village of Puhoi as Puhoi; the area had many names with the main one being Okahu.

== History ==
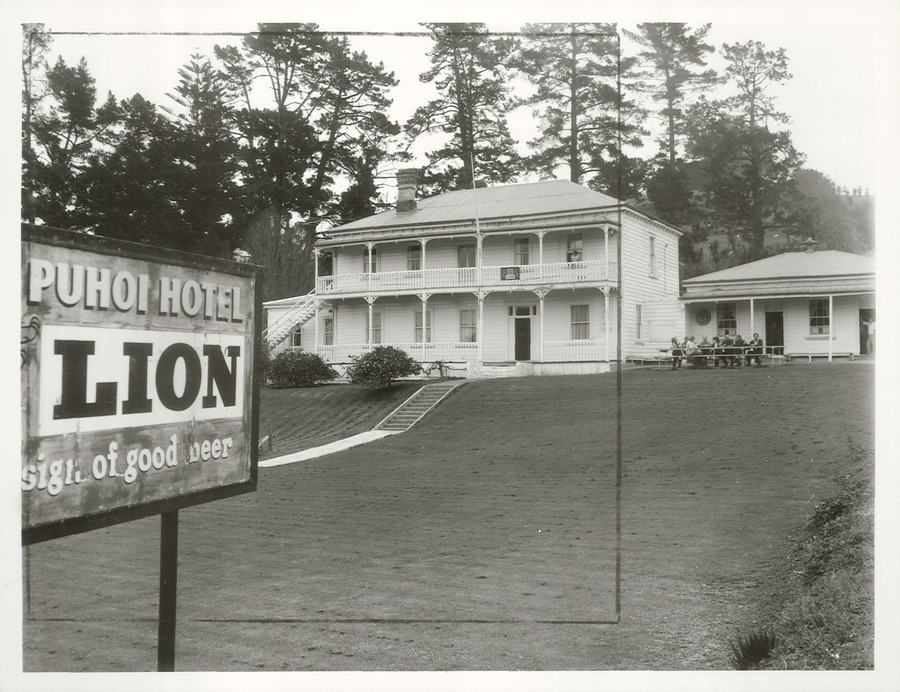
Puhoi Hotel in 1979

European settlement began on 29 June 1863 by a group of German-speaking migrants from Staab (modern Stod) in Bohemia, now in the Czech Republic, under the leadership of Captain Martin Krippner. This has given it the appellation of "Bohemian Settlement". Altogether three batches of migrants arrived between 1863 and 1866.

The first settlers to Puhoi were transported up the river by Māori in 1863. A commemoration stone to these settlers is located in the village.

The migrants were allocated parcels of land by the colonial government, but when they arrived the land was still covered with forest, which they had to clear before they could begin using it.

The original settlers were all of the Roman Catholic faith and one of the first things they turned their attention to was constructing a church. This was completed in 1881 and dedicated to Saints Peter and Paul whose feast day in the Catholic calendar falls on 29 June, the date of the arrival of the first settlers. The church still stands today and serves the community. The hotel and general store also have their origins from the times of the first settlers. There is a museum which occupies premises that were originally built as the Catholic primary school (1923–1964).

The Puhoi Hotel is a historical building in the area, first receiving a liquor license in 1879, when it was known as the German Hotel.

The Puhoi Historic Village Zone was created in 1976 to preserve the character and history of Puhoi. Several buildings were listed as having historic significance, including: the Church of Saints Peter and Paul, the roadside shrine, the Puhoi Town Library, and the Puhoi Pub Hotel.

== Governance ==
The Puhoi Road District was formed 26 September 1867 and began operation in 1873. It dissolved in 1923.

== Demographics ==
Statistics New Zealand describes Puhoi as a rural settlement, which covers 3.59 km^{2} (1.39 sq mi) and had an estimated population of 400 as of June 2025, with a population density of 111 people per km^{2}. Puhoi settlement is part of the larger Puhoi Valley statistical area.

Historical population for Puhoi settlement
Year	Pop.	±% p.a.
2006	261	—
2013	297	+1.86%
2018	360	+3.92%
2023	399	+2.08%

Puhoi had a population of 399 in the 2023 New Zealand census, an increase of 39 people (10.8%) since the 2018 census, and an increase of 102 people (34.3%) since the 2013 census. There were 192 males and 207 females in 138 dwellings. 2.3% of people identified as LGBTIQ+. The median age was 42.3 years (compared with 38.1 years nationally). There were 87 people (21.8%) aged under 15 years, 54 (13.5%) aged 15 to 29, 198 (49.6%) aged 30 to 64, and 60 (15.0%) aged 65 or older.

People could identify as more than one ethnicity. The results were 94.0% European (Pākehā); 8.3% Māori; 3.8% Pasifika; 3.8% Asian; 3.8% Middle Eastern, Latin American and African New Zealanders (MELAA); and 2.3% other, which includes people giving their ethnicity as "New Zealander". English was spoken by 97.7%, Māori language by 0.8%, and other languages by 8.3%. No language could be spoken by 2.3% (e.g. too young to talk). The percentage of people born overseas was 29.3, compared with 28.8% nationally.

Religious affiliations were 33.8% Christian, 0.8% Buddhist, 0.8% New Age, and 0.8% other religions. People who answered that they had no religion were 56.4%, and 6.8% of people did not answer the census question.

Of those at least 15 years old, 78 (25.0%) people had a bachelor's or higher degree, 150 (48.1%) had a post-high school certificate or diploma, and 57 (18.3%) people exclusively held high school qualifications. The median income was $52,800, compared with $41,500 nationally. 72 people (23.1%) earned over $100,000 compared to 12.1% nationally. The employment status of those at least 15 was that 159 (51.0%) people were employed full-time, 51 (16.3%) were part-time, and 12 (3.8%) were unemployed.

=== Puhoi Valley statistical area ===
Puhoi Valley statistical area, which also includes Kaipara Flats and Mahurangi West, covers 236.49 km^{2} (91.31 sq mi) and had an estimated population of 4,130 as of June 2025, with a population density of 17 people per km^{2}.

Historical population for Puhoi Valley
Year	Pop.	±% p.a.
2006	2,727	—
2013	3,141	+2.04%
2018	3,702	+3.34%
2023	4,017	+1.65%

Puhoi Valley had a population of 4,017 in the 2023 New Zealand census, an increase of 315 people (8.5%) since the 2018 census, and an increase of 876 people (27.9%) since the 2013 census. There were 2,034 males, 1,971 females and 12 people of other genders in 1,380 dwellings. 2.5% of people identified as LGBTIQ+. The median age was 45.0 years (compared with 38.1 years nationally). There were 726 people (18.1%) aged under 15 years, 600 (14.9%) aged 15 to 29, 2,004 (49.9%) aged 30 to 64, and 687 (17.1%) aged 65 or older.

People could identify as more than one ethnicity. The results were 89.7% European (Pākehā); 9.7% Māori; 4.9% Pasifika; 4.1% Asian; 1.3% Middle Eastern, Latin American and African New Zealanders (MELAA); and 3.4% other, which includes people giving their ethnicity as "New Zealander". English was spoken by 97.7%, Māori language by 0.8%, Samoan by 0.2%, and other languages by 12.1%. No language could be spoken by 1.6% (e.g. too young to talk). New Zealand Sign Language was known by 0.2%. The percentage of people born overseas was 26.8, compared with 28.8% nationally.

Religious affiliations were 29.9% Christian, 0.4% Hindu, 0.1% Islam, 0.4% Māori religious beliefs, 0.7% Buddhist, 0.7% New Age, 0.3% Jewish, and 1.0% other religions. People who answered that they had no religion were 58.2%, and 8.3% of people did not answer the census question.

Of those at least 15 years old, 666 (20.2%) people had a bachelor's or higher degree, 1,707 (51.9%) had a post-high school certificate or diploma, and 675 (20.5%) people exclusively held high school qualifications. The median income was $44,900, compared with $41,500 nationally. 558 people (17.0%) earned over $100,000 compared to 12.1% nationally. The employment status of those at least 15 was that 1,683 (51.1%) people were employed full-time, 573 (17.4%) were part-time, and 75 (2.3%) were unemployed.

== Amenities ==
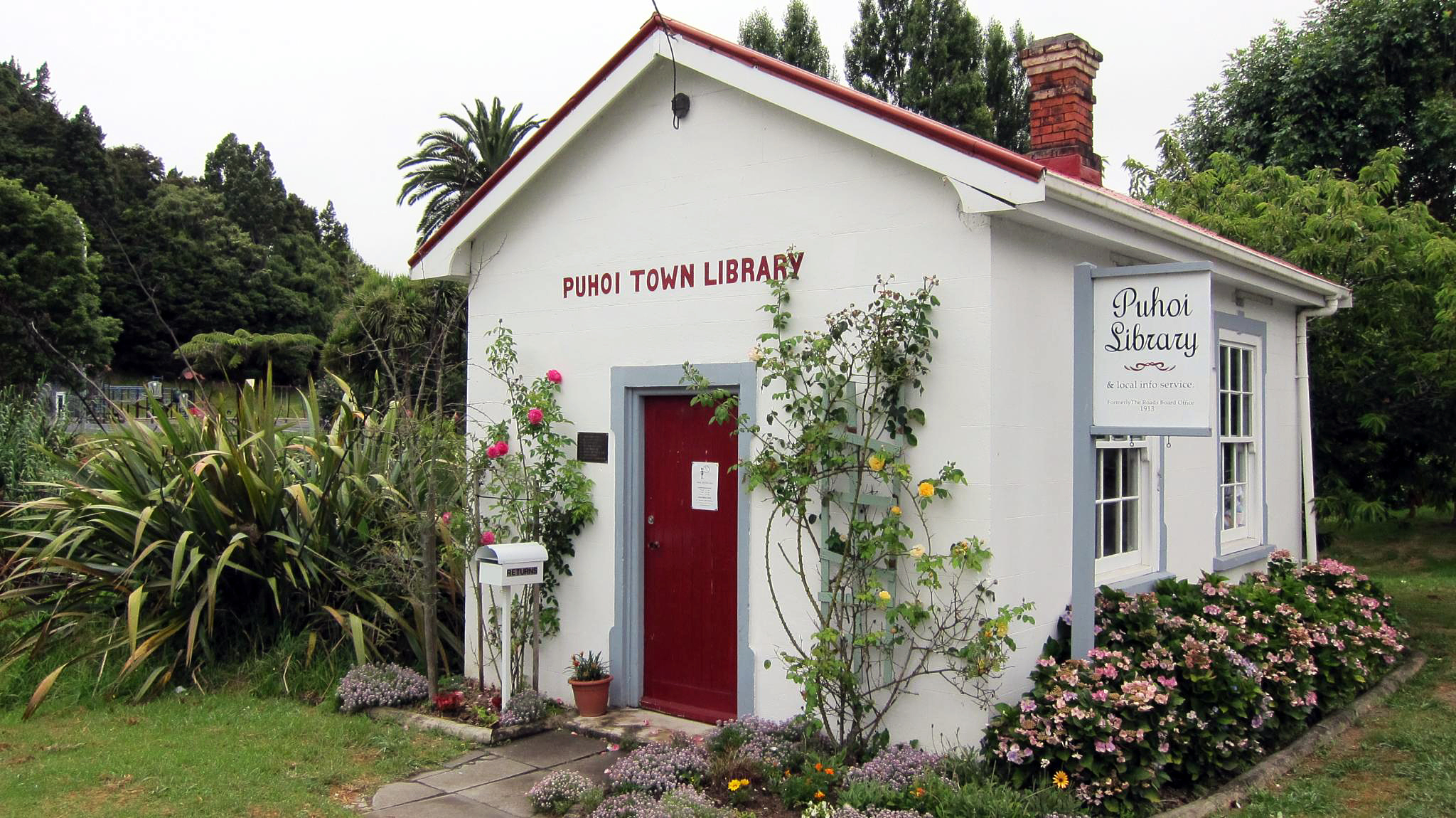
Puhoi Town Library

The Puhoi Town Library, one of the smallest in New Zealand, was established in 1923 in what was originally the Districts Road Board Office (built 1913). In the "Great Flood" of 1924 it was filled with 6 ft of silt, and its contents destroyed – the water level is marked on the building. The library was not re-established until 1977. It was flooded again in 2001. It contains over 4000 books and 500 DVDs and is staffed by a single volunteer librarian. The library was damaged again in the 2023 Auckland Anniversary Weekend floods, and reopened in April 2025.

The Puhoi Pioneers Memorial Park Domain is found to the north of the village, across the Puhoi River. The park features a walking track, which climbs a ridge to a lookout, offering views of the village below.

== Films and TV ==
- Trespasses (1984)
- Sylvia (1985)
- Bridge to Terabithia (2007)
