= Chotěšov (Plzeň-South District) =

- Municipality
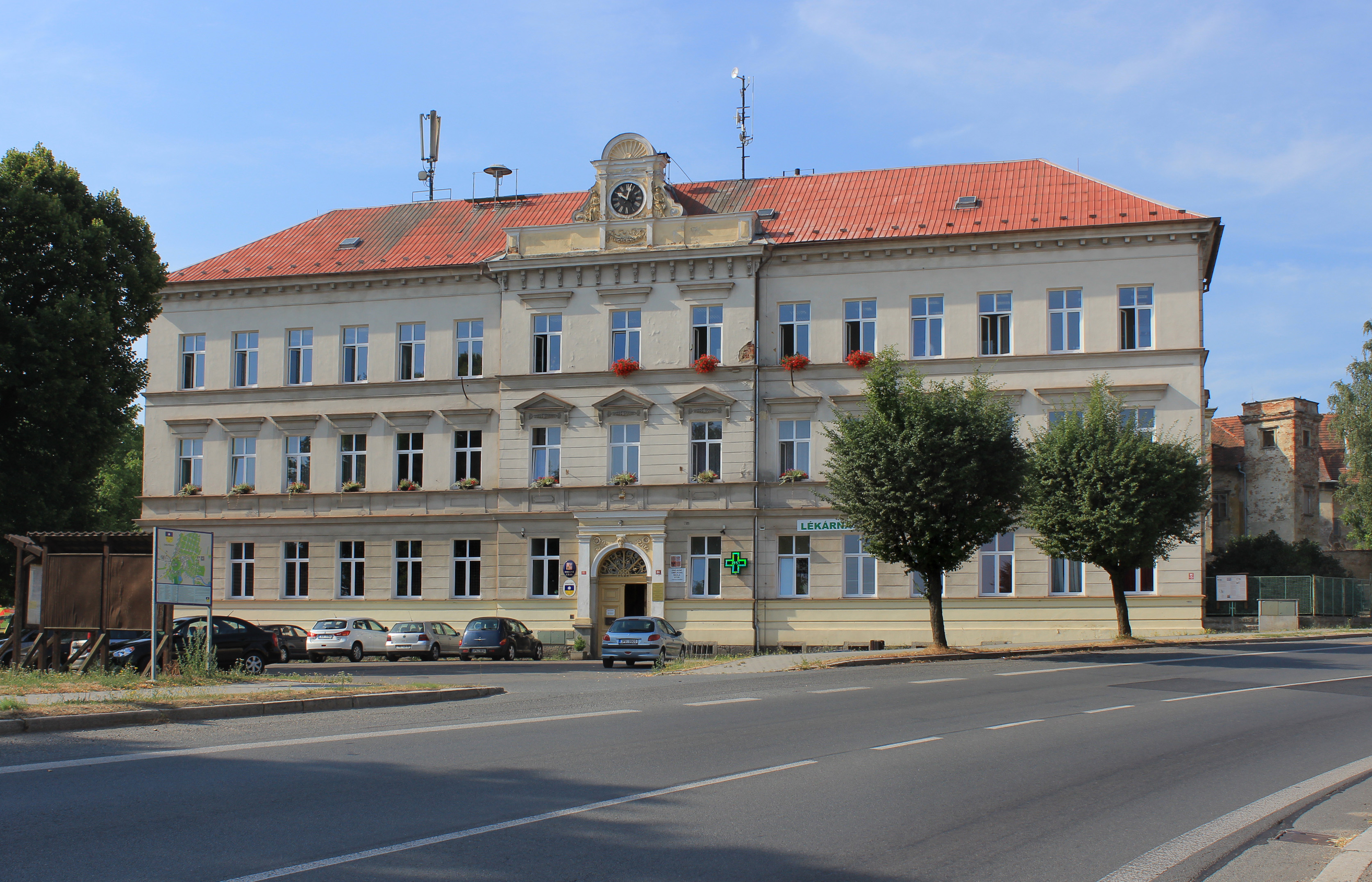
- Municipal office

- Flag Coat of arms

- Location in the Czech Republic
- Coordinates: 49°39′14″N 13°11′55″E
- Country: Czech Republic
- Region: Plzeň
- District: Plzeň-South
- First mentioned: 1115

Area
  - Total: 26.81 km^{2} (10.35 sq mi)
- Elevation: 358 m (1,175 ft)

Population (2026-01-01)
  - Total: 3,051
  - Density: 113.8/km^{2} (294.7/sq mi)
- Time zone: UTC+1 (CET)
  - Summer (DST): UTC+2 (CEST)
- Postal codes: 332 14, 333 01
- Website: www.obec-chotesov.cz

Chotěšov (Czech pronunciation: [ˈxocɛʃof]; German: Chotieschau) is a municipality and village in Plzeň-South District in the Plzeň Region of the Czech Republic. It has about 3,100 inhabitants. The municipality is located on the Radbuza River, on the border between the Plasy Uplands and Švihov Highlands.

Chotěšov is known for the Chotěšov Abbey, which is protected as a national cultural monument.

== Administrative division ==
Chotěšov consists of five municipal parts (in brackets population according to the 2021 census):

- Chotěšov (2,197)
- Hoříkovice (85)
- Losina (63)
- Mantov (539)
- Týnec (51)

== Etymology ==
The name is derived from the personal name Chotěš, meaning "Chotěš's (court)".

== Geography ==
Chotěšov is located about 15 kilometres (9 mi) southwest of Plzeň. It lies mostly in the Plasy Uplands. The southernmost part of the municipal territory lies in the Švihov Highlands and includes the highest point of Chotěšov, the hill Křížový vrch at 487 m (1,598 ft) above sea level. The Radbuza River flows through the municipality. There are several fishponds in the municipality, the largest of which is Velký rybník.

== History ==
The first written mention of Chotěšov is from 1115. History of the village was connected with the Chotěšov Abbey, which was founded in 1202–1210. In 1822, the estate was bought by Karl Alexander of Thurn and Taxis. His family owned Chotěšov until 1925, and the monastery complex until 1945.

== Demographics ==
Historical population

Year	Pop.	±%
1869	1,985	—
1880	2,296	+15.7%
1890	2,659	+15.8%
1900	3,660	+37.6%
1910	4,425	+20.9%

Year	Pop.	±%
1921	4,885	+10.4%
1930	4,787	−2.0%
1950	4,067	−15.0%
1961	3,726	−8.4%
1970	3,139	−15.8%

Year	Pop.	±%
1980	2,897	−7.7%
1991	2,592	−10.5%
2001	2,603	+0.4%
2011	2,806	+7.8%
2021	2,935	+4.6%

Source: Censuses

== Economy ==
Chotěšov is home to MD Elektronik, a manufacturer of electrical equipment for automotive industry. This branch of the German company Merx, Diem & Co. GmbH was founded in Chotěšov in 1993. With more than 2,000 employees, MD Elektronik is among the largest employers in the region.

== Transport ==
The I/26 road from Plzeň to the Czech–German border in Horní Folmava runs through the municipality.

Chotěšov is located on the railway line Plzeň–Domažlice.

== Sights ==
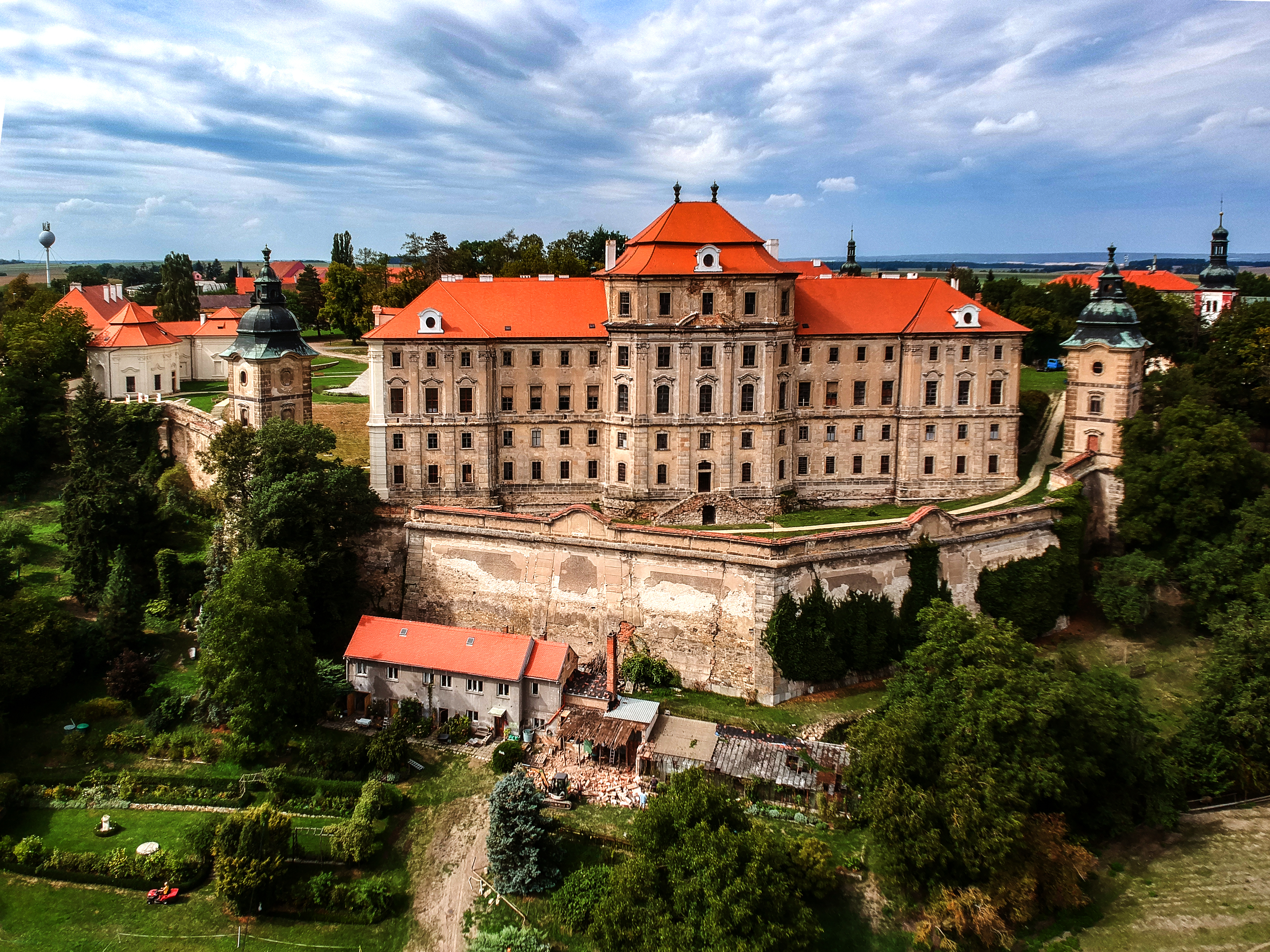
Chotěšov Abbey

Chotěšov is known for the Chotěšov Abbey. The current building of the convent dates from 1756 and was built according to the plans of Jakub Auguston. Today this former Premonstratensian monastery is open to the public and in addition to several exhibitions, it also offers guided tours. The monastery complex is protected as a national cultural monument.

On the hill Křížový vrch is a former church from the mid-19th century with a tower from 1931. The 22 m (72 ft) high tower now serves as a lookout tower.

== Notable people ==
- Martin Krippner (1817–1894), Austrian military officer
