= Srby (Domažlice District) =

- Municipality
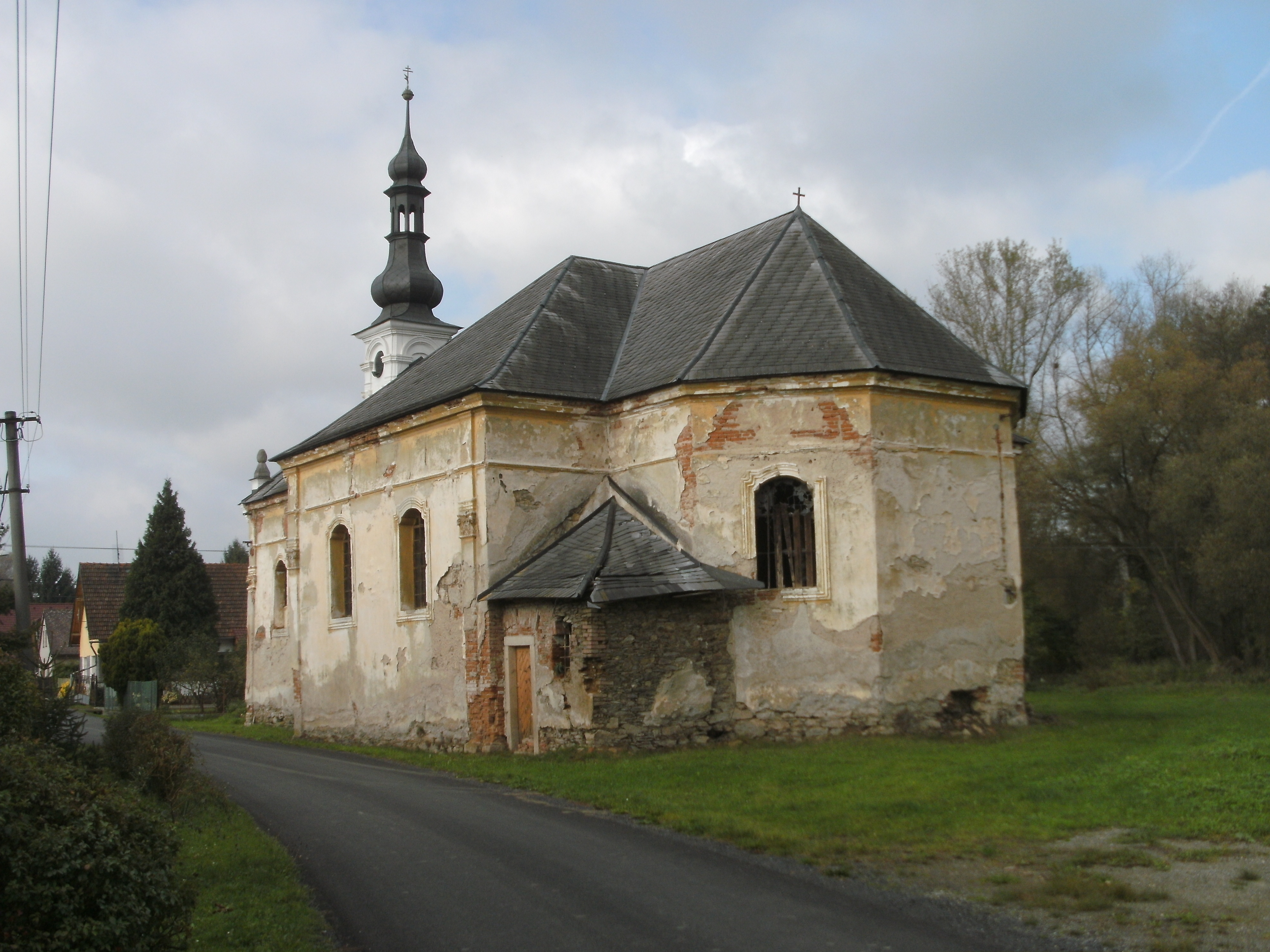
- Church of Saint John the Baptist

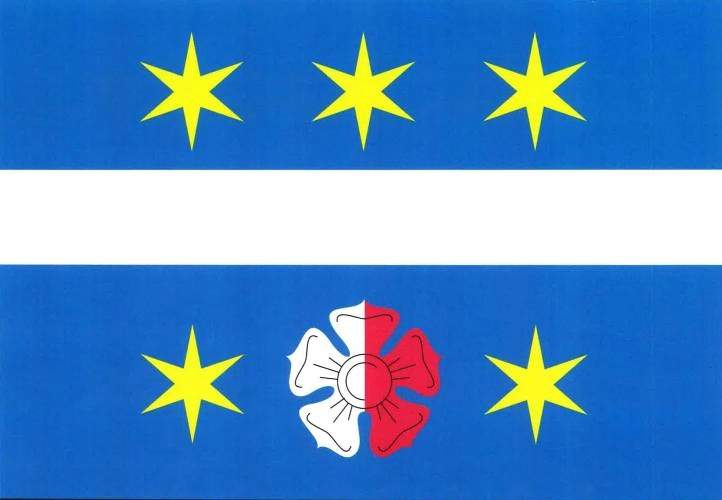
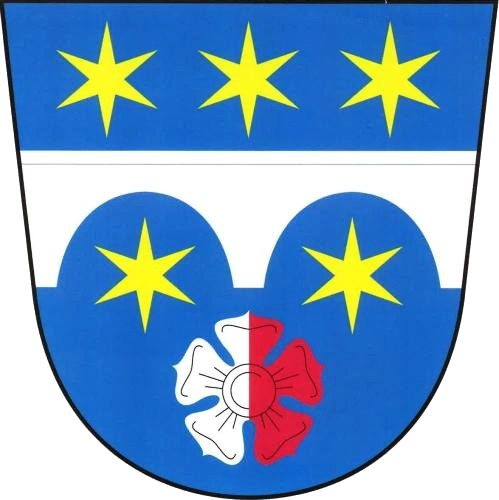
- Flag Coat of arms

- Location in the Czech Republic
- Coordinates: 49°32′13″N 12°52′6″E
- Country: Czech Republic
- Region: Plzeň
- District: Domažlice
- First mentioned: 1312

Area
  - Total: 20.45 km^{2} (7.90 sq mi)
- Elevation: 385 m (1,263 ft)

Population (2026-01-01)
  - Total: 477
  - Density: 23.3/km^{2} (60.4/sq mi)
- Time zone: UTC+1 (CET)
  - Summer (DST): UTC+2 (CEST)
- Postal code: 346 01
- Website: www.obecsrby.cz

Srby (German: Sirb) is a municipality and village in Domažlice District in the Plzeň Region of the Czech Republic. It has about 500 inhabitants.

Srby lies approximately 12 kilometres (7 mi) north-west of Domažlice, 44 km (27 mi) south-west of Plzeň, and 128 km (80 mi) south-west of Prague.

== Administrative division ==
Srby consists of five municipal parts (in brackets population according to the 2021 census):

- Srby (300)
- Medná (25)
- Polžice (101)
- Roudná (10)
- Vítání (34)

== Demographics ==
Historical population
Year	Pop.	±%
1869	1,067	—
1880	1,062	−0.5%
1890	1,022	−3.8%
1900	1,077	+5.4%
1910	1,131	+5.0%
1921	1,091	−3.5%
1930	1,046	−4.1%
1950	482	−53.9%
1961	504	+4.6%
1970	503	−0.2%
1980	422	−16.1%
1991	402	−4.7%
2001	390	−3.0%
2011	381	−2.3%
2021	470	+23.4%
Source: Censuses
