= Křenovy =

- Municipality
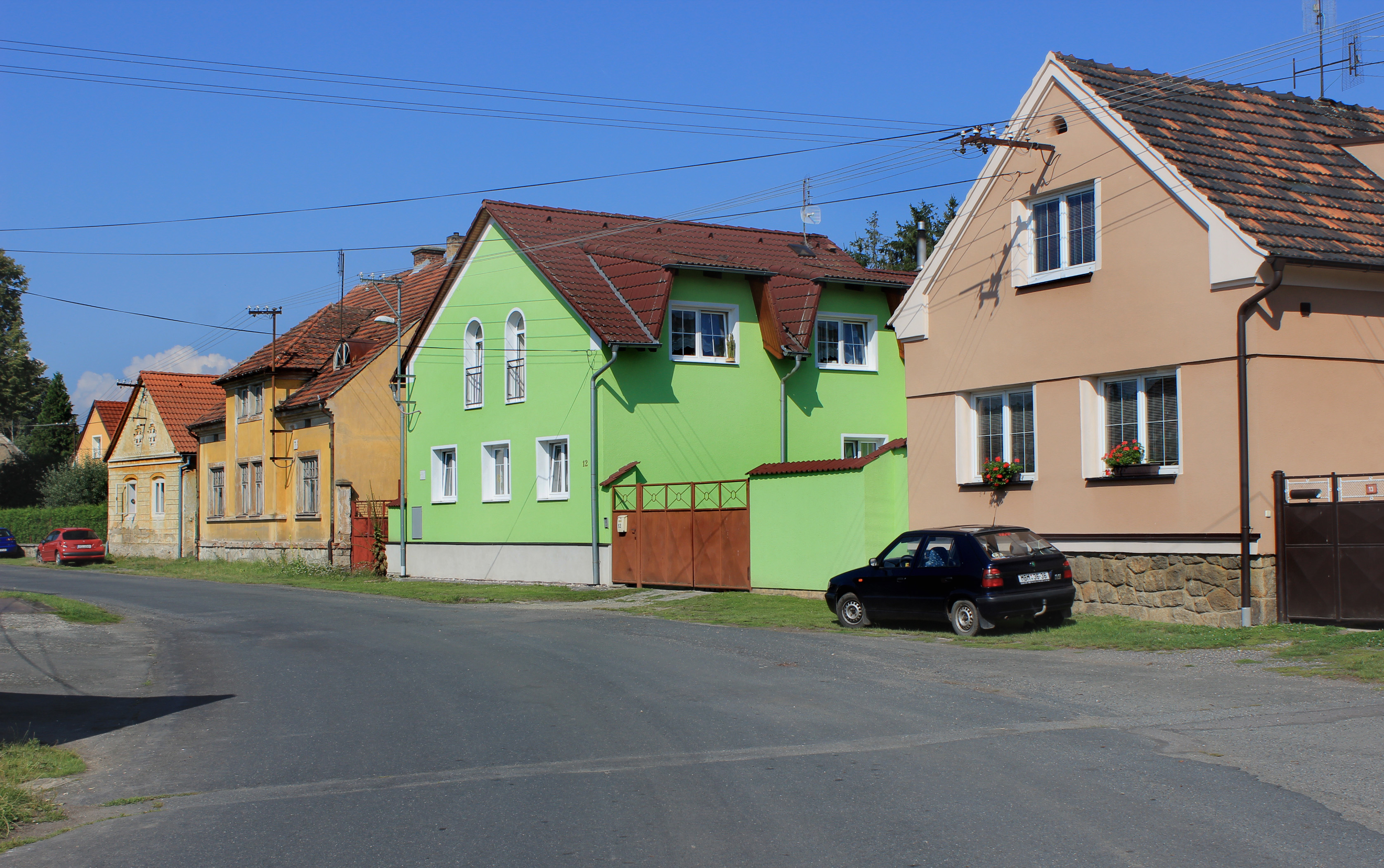
- Centre of Křenovy

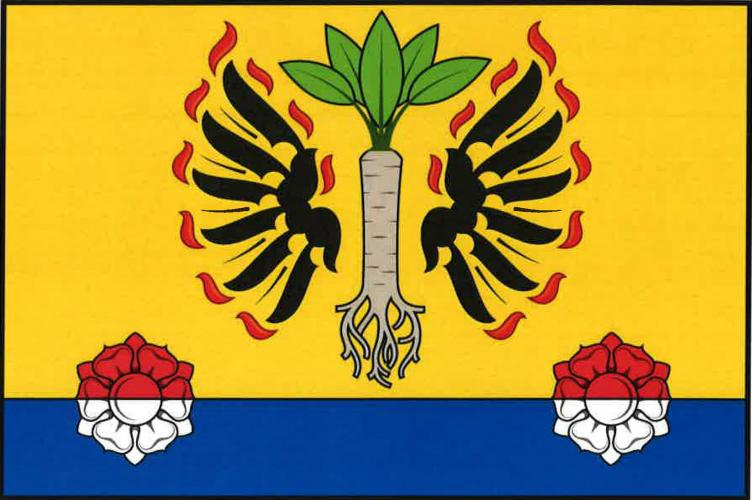
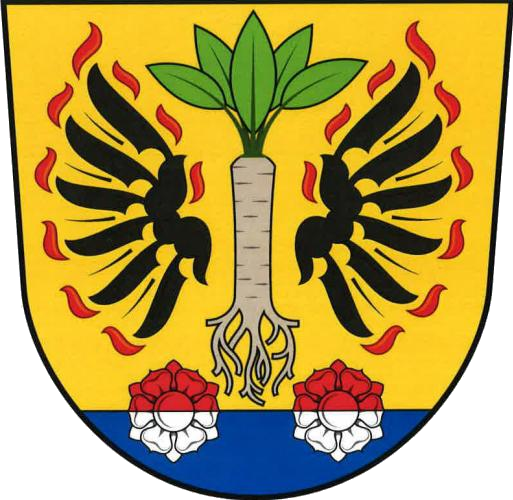
- Flag Coat of arms

- Location in the Czech Republic
- Coordinates: 49°32′21″N 13°1′18″E
- Country: Czech Republic
- Region: Plzeň
- District: Domažlice
- First mentioned: 1379

Area
  - Total: 3.13 km^{2} (1.21 sq mi)
- Elevation: 368 m (1,207 ft)

Population (2026-01-01)
  - Total: 147
  - Density: 47.0/km^{2} (122/sq mi)
- Time zone: UTC+1 (CET)
  - Summer (DST): UTC+2 (CEST)
- Postal code: 345 61
- Website: www.krenovy.cz

Křenovy is a municipality and village in Domažlice District in the Plzeň Region of the Czech Republic. It has about 100 inhabitants.

Křenovy lies approximately 13 kilometres (8 mi) north-east of Domažlice, 35 km (22 mi) south-west of Plzeň, and 118 km (73 mi) south-west of Prague.

== History ==
The first written mention of Křenovy is from 1379.

== Demographics ==
Historical population
Year	Pop.	±%
1869	203	—
1880	203	+0.0%
1890	228	+12.3%
1900	264	+15.8%
1910	244	−7.6%
1921	203	−16.8%
1930	225	+10.8%
1950	176	−21.8%
1961	188	+6.8%
1970	180	−4.3%
1980	186	+3.3%
1991	149	−19.9%
2001	150	+0.7%
2011	148	−1.3%
2021	137	−7.4%
Source: Censuses
