= Hradec (Plzeň-South District) =

- Municipality
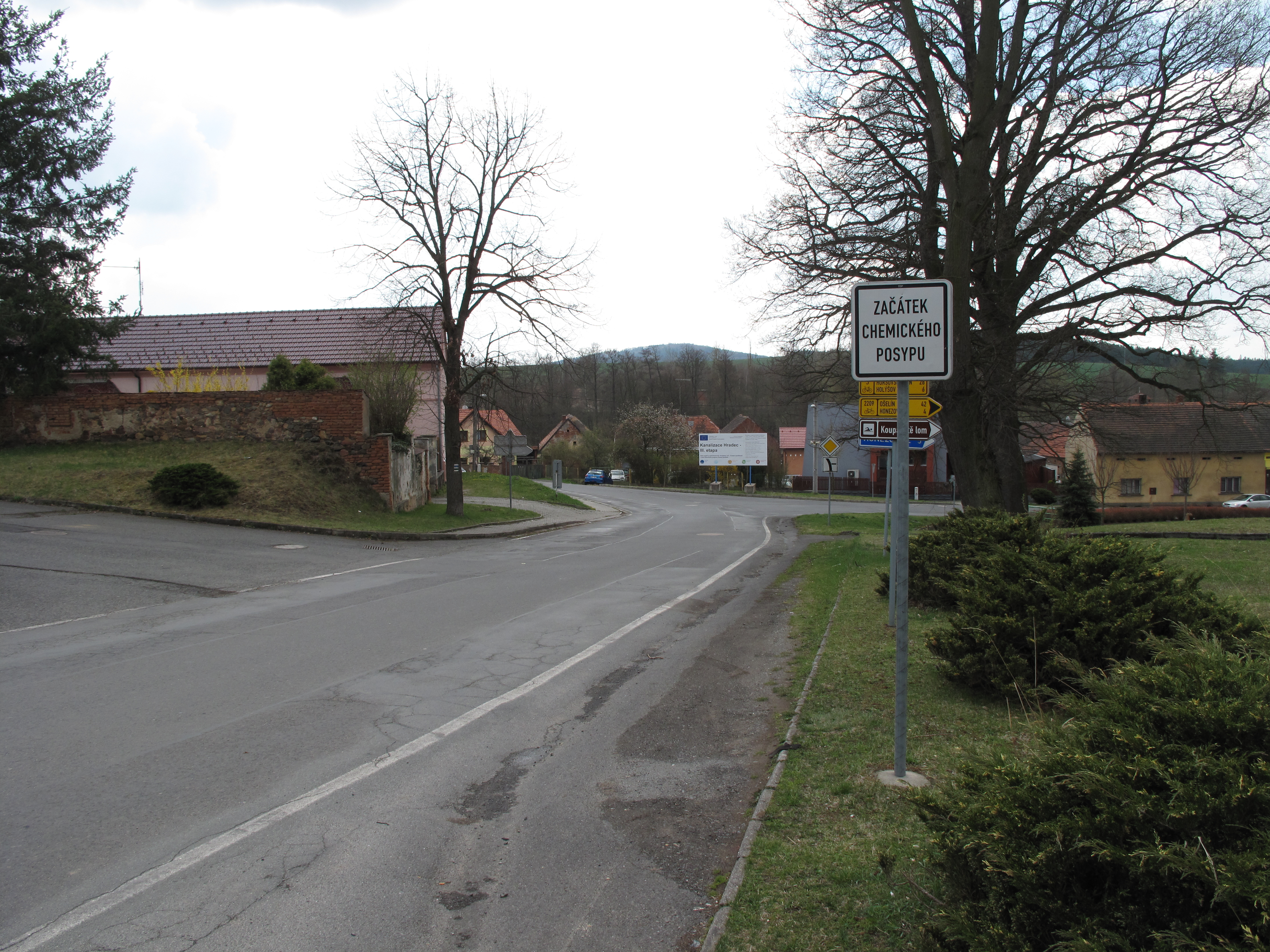
- Centre of Hradec

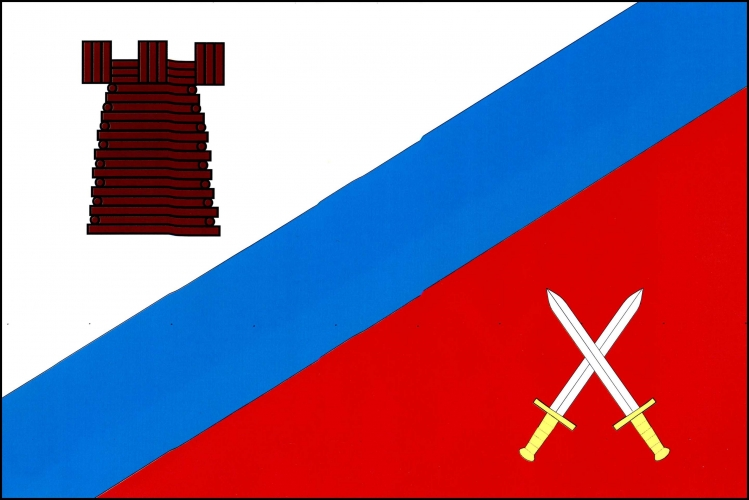
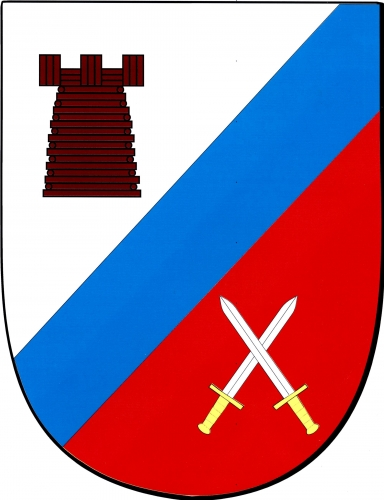
- Flag Coat of arms

- Location in the Czech Republic
- Coordinates: 49°38′7″N 13°7′17″E
- Country: Czech Republic
- Region: Plzeň
- District: Plzeň-South
- First mentioned: 1186

Area
  - Total: 6.73 km^{2} (2.60 sq mi)
- Elevation: 348 m (1,142 ft)

Population (2026-01-01)
  - Total: 618
  - Density: 91.8/km^{2} (238/sq mi)
- Time zone: UTC+1 (CET)
  - Summer (DST): UTC+2 (CEST)
- Postal code: 332 11
- Website: www.ou-hradec.cz

Hradec is a municipality and village in Plzeň-South District in the Plzeň Region of the Czech Republic. It has about 600 inhabitants.

Hradec lies approximately 23 kilometres (14 mi) south-west of Plzeň and 107 km (66 mi) south-west of Prague.

== Demographics ==
Historical population
Year	Pop.	±%
1869	402	—
1880	490	+21.9%
1890	503	+2.7%
1900	537	+6.8%
1910	555	+3.4%
1921	628	+13.2%
1930	714	+13.7%
1950	546	−23.5%
1961	577	+5.7%
1970	520	−9.9%
1980	475	−8.7%
1991	411	−13.5%
2001	422	+2.7%
2011	526	+24.6%
2021	548	+4.2%
Source: Censuses
