= Chotěšov Abbey =

Former nunnery in the Czech Republic

Coordinates: 49°39′8″N 13°11′54″E

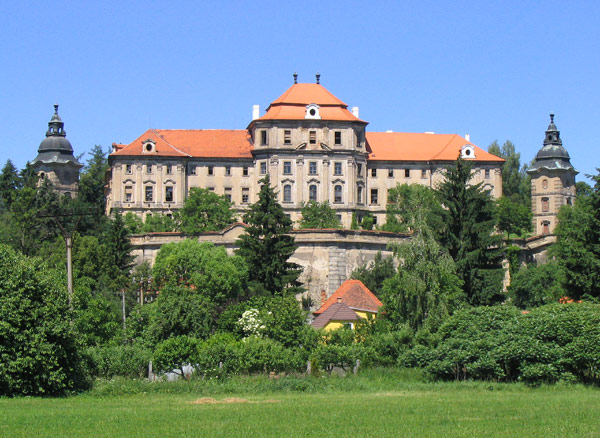
Chotěšov Abbey

Aerial view of the abbey

Chotěšov Abbey (Czech: Klášter Chotěšov) is a former Premonstratensian nunnery in Chotěšov, about 18 kilometres southwest of Plzeň in the Plzeň Region of the Czech Republic.

== History ==
=== Premonstratensian nunnery ===
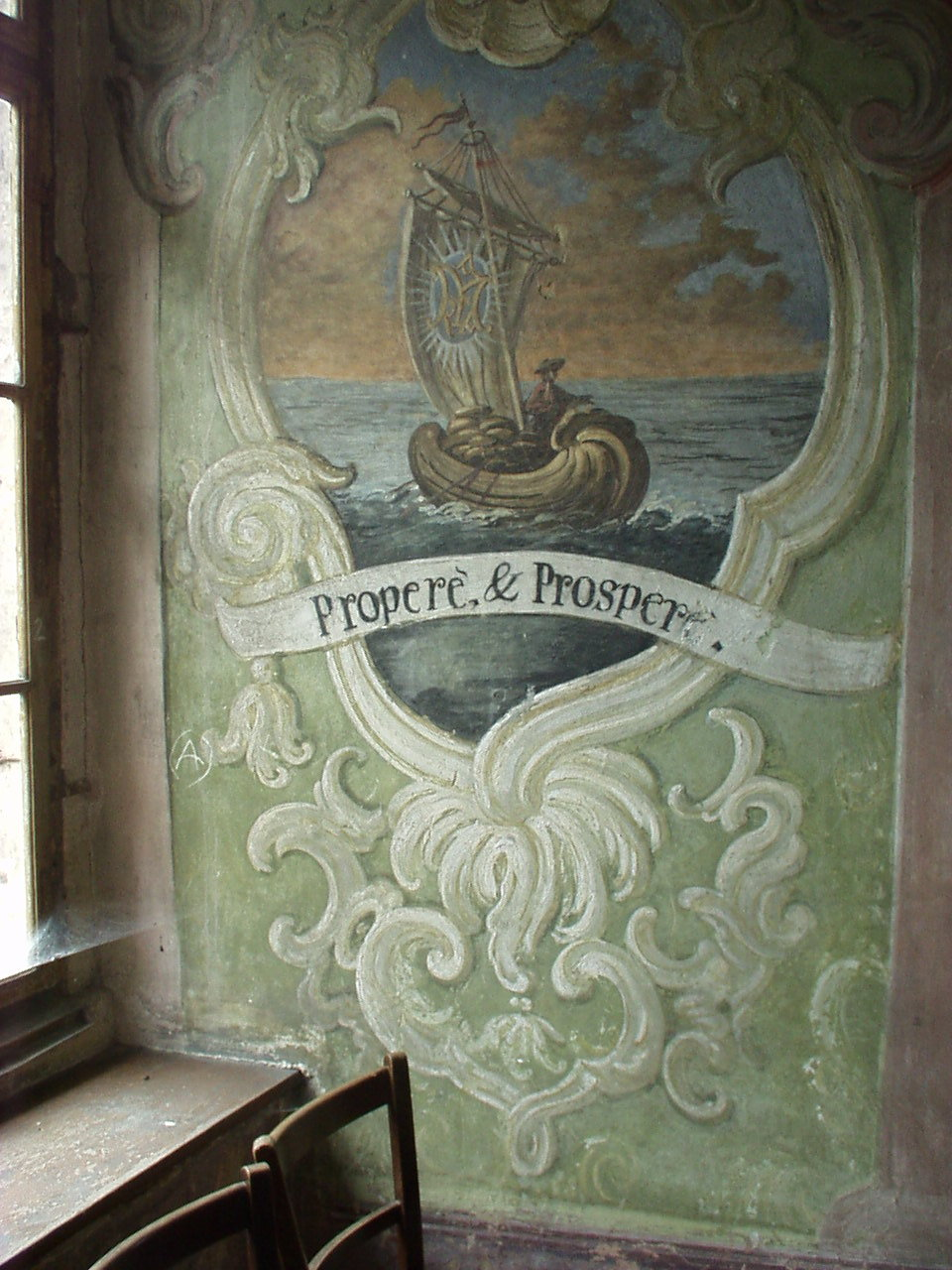
Decoration of interiors. Scene of the thuderstorm, when the blessed Hroznata came to the conclusion to found the Monastery.

The abbey was founded between 1202 and 1210 by the Blessed Hroznata, whose sister Vojslava was the first abbess, and settled by nuns from Doksany Abbey. The new foundation soon acquired wealth and influence, to the envy of the surrounding lordships and territories.

In 1421, during the Hussite Wars the nunnery was occupied and destroyed by a Hussite army under Jan Žižka. During the Thirty Years' War, in 1618, the nunnery was again occupied and plundered.

Between 1737 and 1756 the abbey was extensively rebuilt to Baroque designs by Jakub Auguston.

=== Dissolution ===
On 21 January 1782 it was dissolved under the rationalist reforms of the Emperor Joseph II. The lands and buildings were bought in 1822 by the Prince of Thurn und Taxis.

=== Salesian Sisters ===
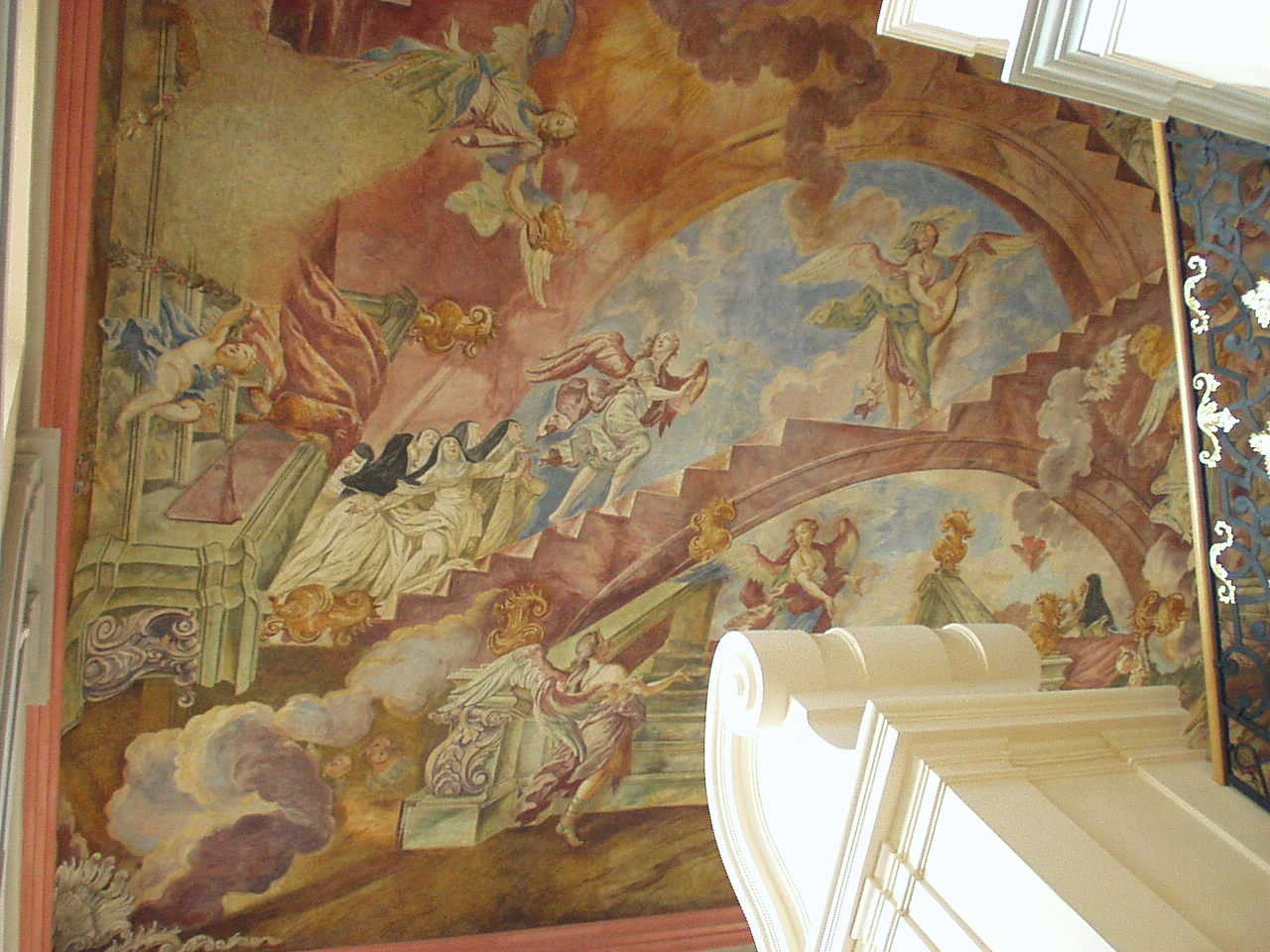
Fresco above the main stairs. Nuns on the way up to the God.

In 1878 part of the premises were leased to the Order of the Visitation of Holy Mary, also known as the Visitandines or Salesian Sisters, for refugees of their Order from Moselweiss near Koblenz in Germany. They established a community and a girls' school here, which rapidly became well-known, particularly for the study of languages.

After World War I a group of sisters returned to Germany and set up a community in Marchtal Abbey. At the beginning of World War II the school was closed and instead the sisters took over the running of a home for elderly women which was established in part of the premises. All German sisters were obliged to leave the abbey and the country in 1945 after the end of World War II, leaving about 30 Czech sisters to run the home.

=== Post-war ===
All occupants of the abbey were evicted in 1950, when the abbey was requisitioned as accommodation for the Czech army (the protest singer Karel Kryl did part of his military service here in the 1960s) until 1975 when the army left, leaving an estimated 10 million crowns' worth of damage for which compensation has never been received. The buildings have stood empty ever since.

After some years under the control of government agencies, in 1991 ownership of the buildings was divided between the town of Chotěšov and the Visitandine nuns at Chlumec, whose share has since also passed to the town.

The abandoned buildings are in part in a state approaching the derelict and are threatened with collapse, despite their architectural and historical value and the great efforts of the local community to save them.

== In popular culture ==
The abbey was featured in the 2002 movie Bad Company.
