= Sinzendorf =

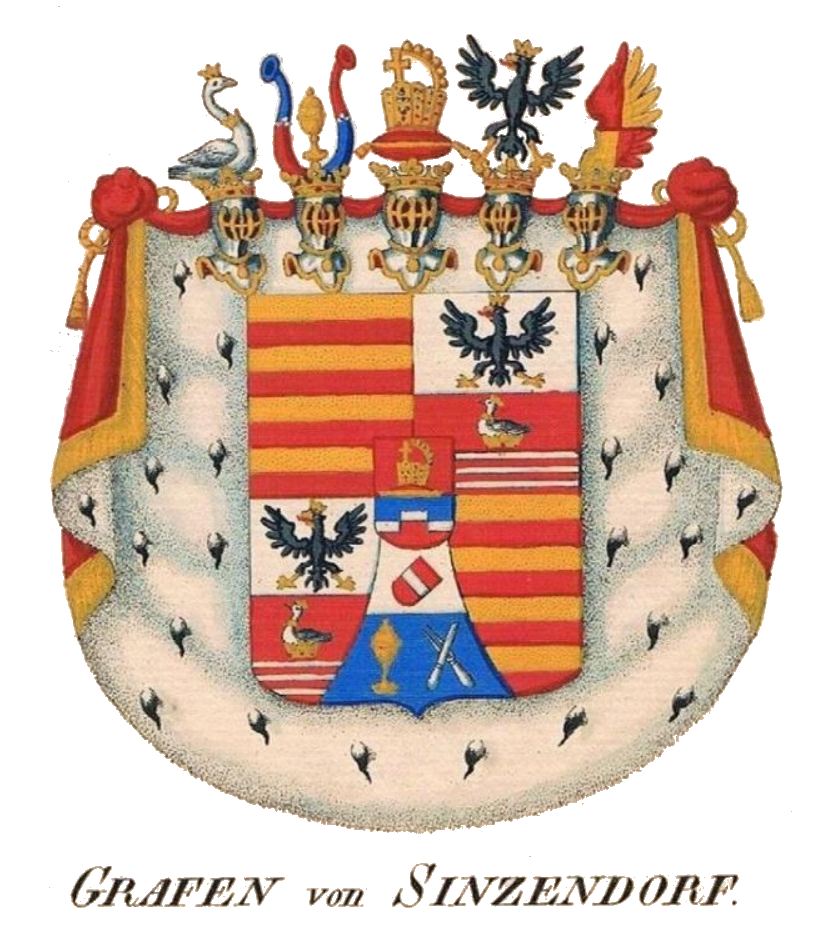
Coat of Arms of the Sinzendorf family

The House of Sinzendorf (also: Sinzendorff) was a German noble family with Upper Austrian origin (Sinzendorf in Nußbach), not to be confused with the Lower Austrian House of Zinzendorf. The family belonged to prestigious circle of high nobility families, but died out in 1822 in the male line.

== History ==
The Sinzendorf family appear in the 13th century as Ministerialis of the Kremsmünster Abbey. The ancestral castle was Sinzendorf in the municipality Nußbach in Traunviertel. They owned Castle Feyregg from 1404 to 1566, and Castle Fridau from 1497 to 1708. Around 1450, the family split into two lines (later referred to as Ernstbrunn-Feyregg and Fridau - Neuburg). In 1592 Joachim von Sinzendorf bought the castle and fief of Ernstbrunn (with Klement Castle and Michelstetten Castle) and considerably expanded the Ernstbrunn Palace.

In 1610 the nobles of Sinzendorf were raised to baron, and in 1653 to Imperial Count. 1653 bought Rudolf von Sinzendorf from Ernstbrunn the castle county Rheineck am Rhein, thus his line was part of the Kuriatstimme the Westphalian Grafenbank in the Imperial Imperial Council and rose to the imperial high nobility. In the second half of the 17th century, Georg Ludwig Graf von Sinzendorf bought the county of Neuburg am Inn, which was lost in 1680 again.

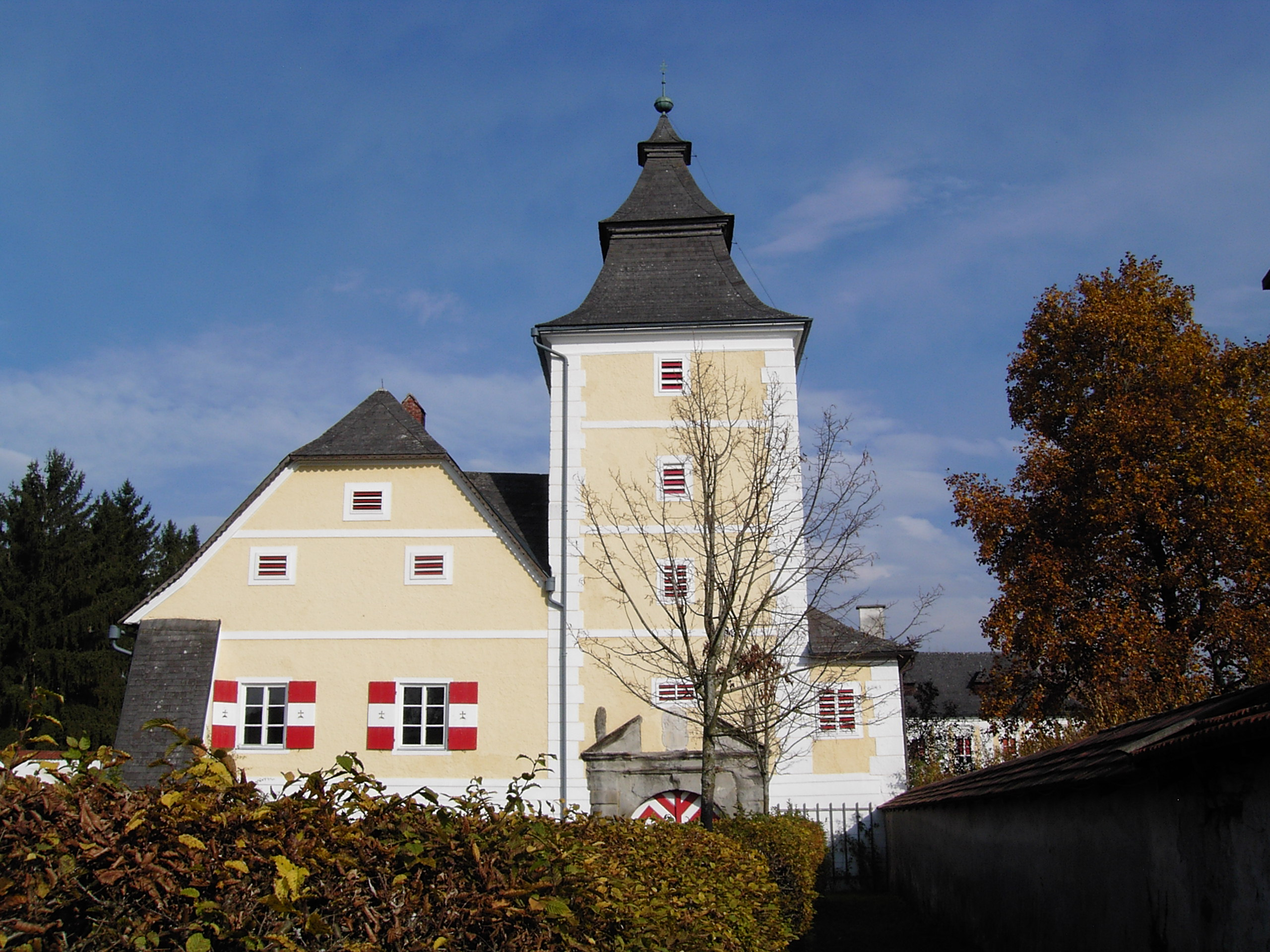
Castle Feyregg, Upper Austria

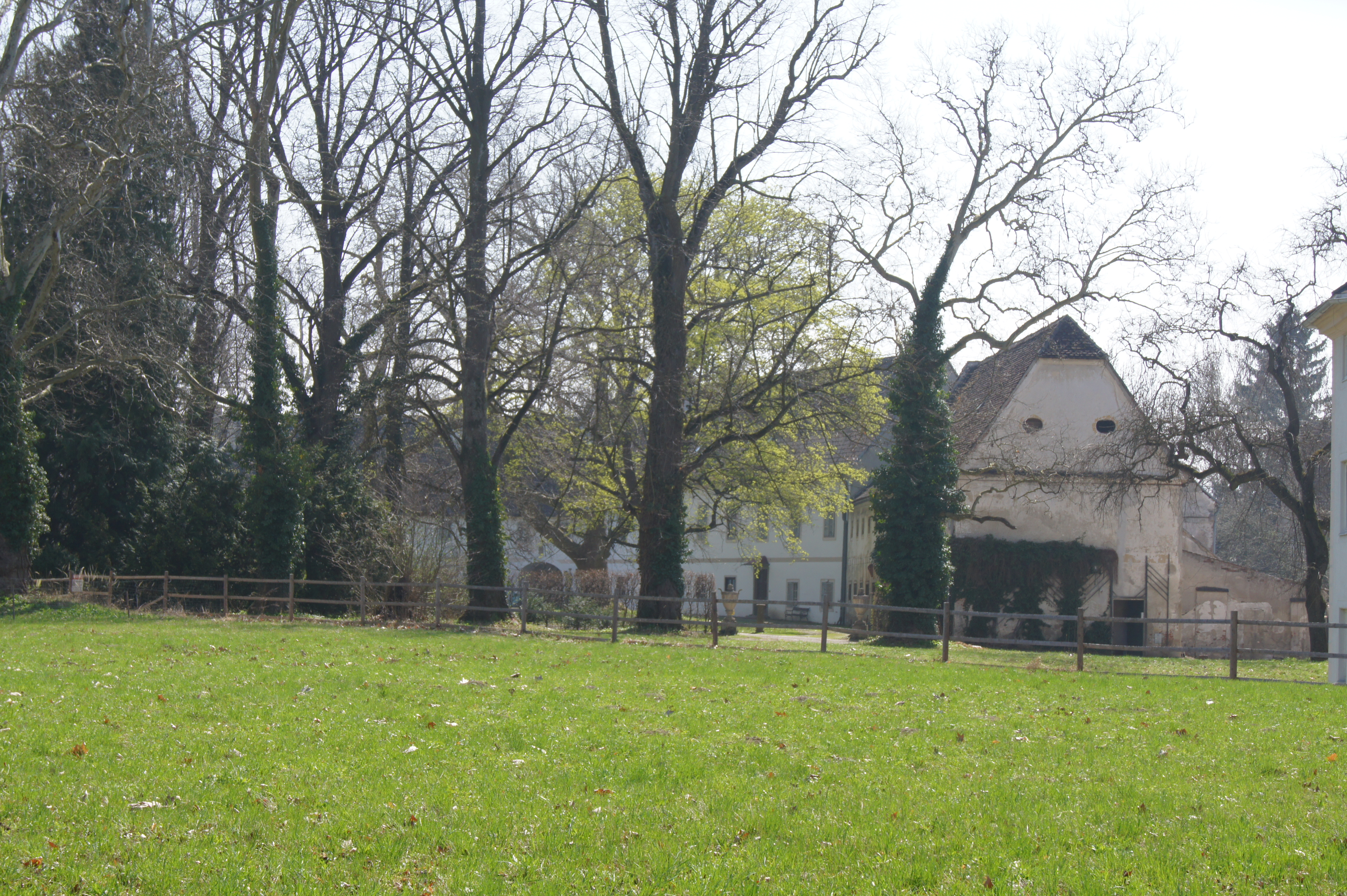
Old Castle Fridau, Lower Austria

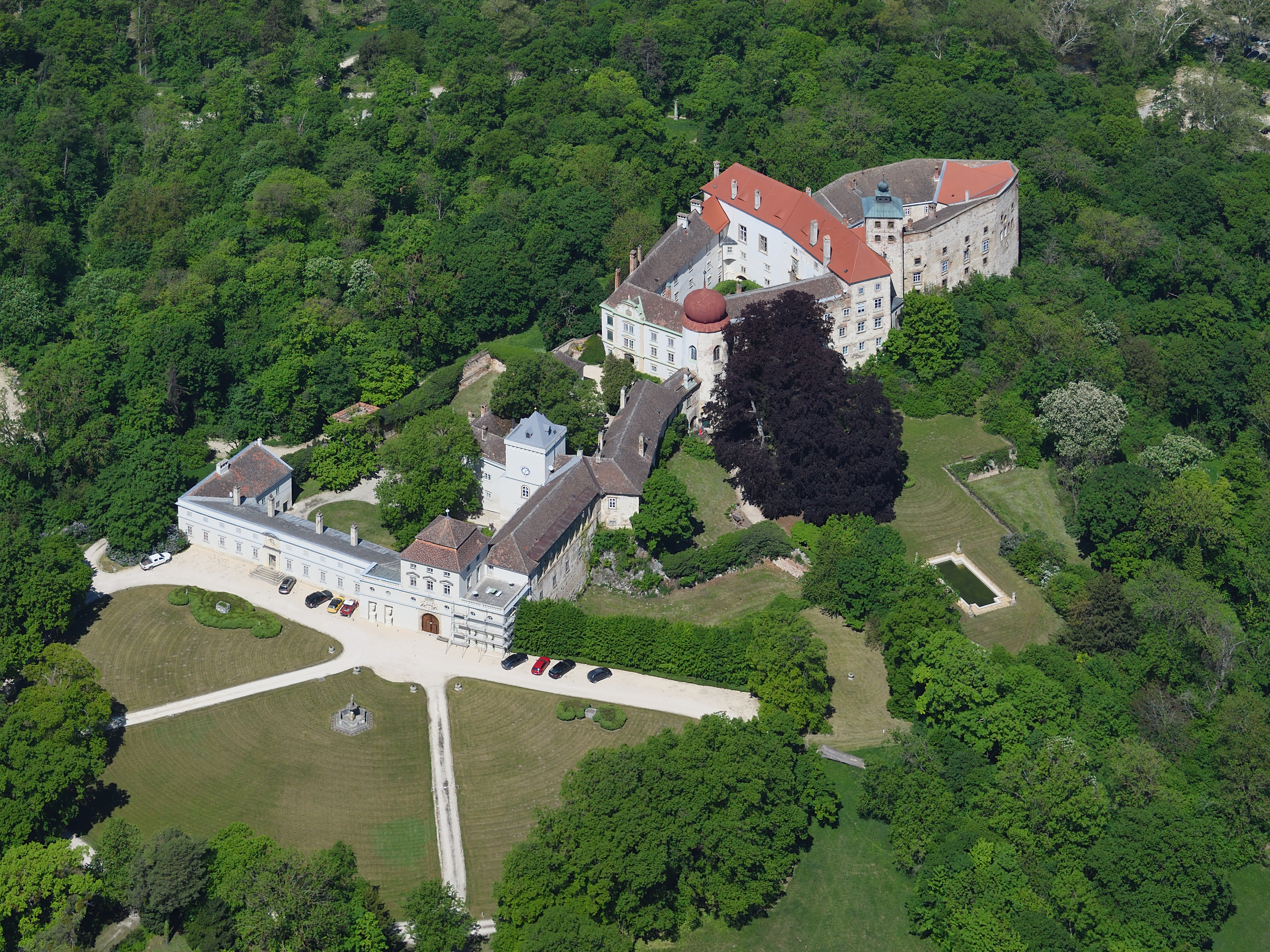
Castle Ernstbrunn, Lower Austria

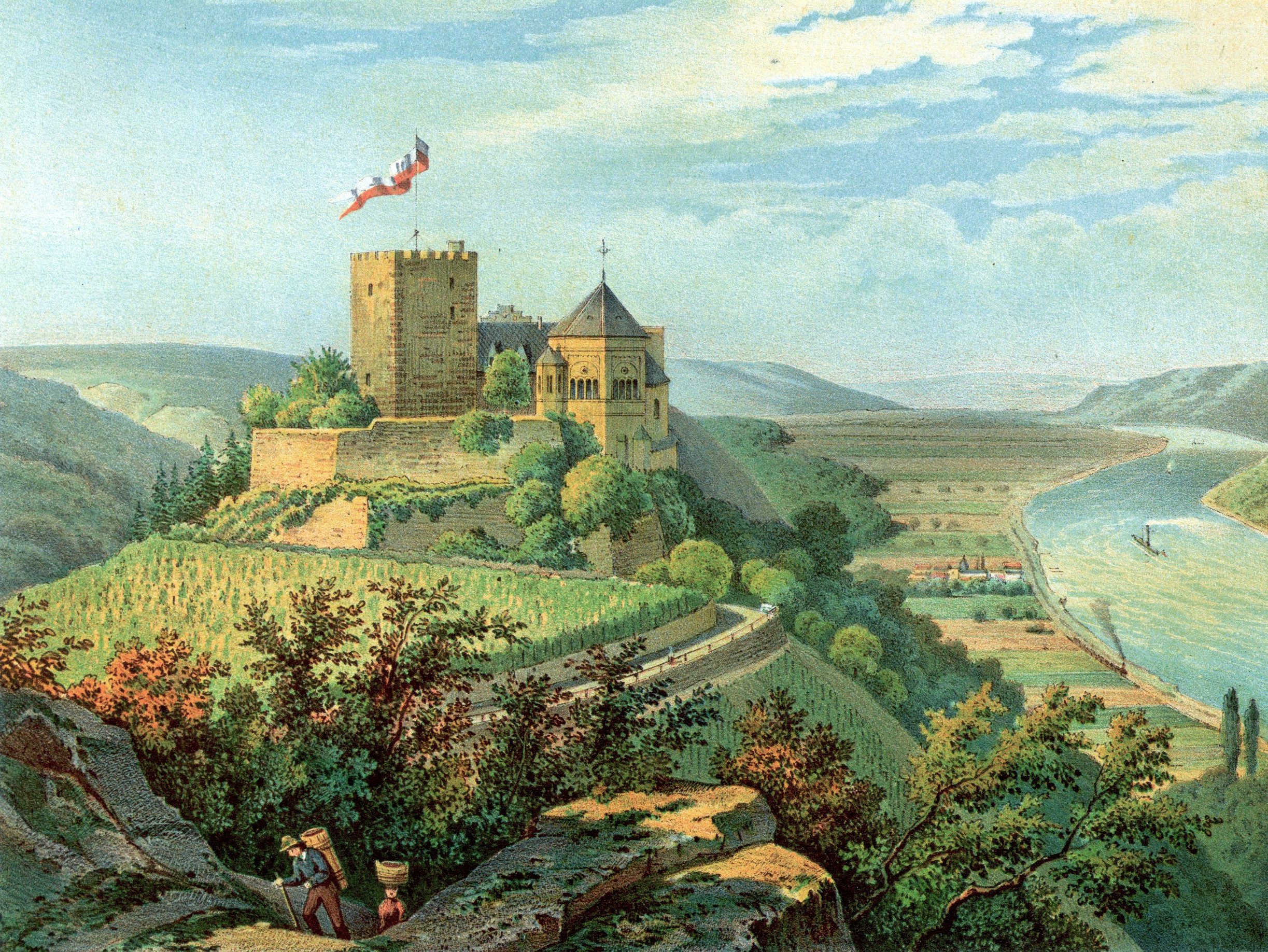
Burg Rheineck on the Middle Rhine

The root coat of arms, augmented with the imperial crown (as Erbschatzmeister)

1654 Count Georg Ludwig von Sinzendorf from the Fridau-Neuburger line was invested as hereditary treasurer of the Holy Roman Empire; in token of this office, he was allowed to add the imperial crown to his coat of arms. In 1677, as the owner of the fief of Thannhausen (Swabia), he became a member of the Swabian Imperial College, until 1708 when this fief was sold by his descendants to the Counts of Stadion.

The line Neuburg am Inn is extinct in 1767. The line Ernst Brunn divided into two; the senior line, raised in 1803 to princes of the Holy Roman Empire, included the dominions Ernst Brunn, Klement, Straussberg, Triebel, Castle Eichhorn (from 1707 to 1802), inter alia, in Austria, Bohemia and Moravia, and the castle county Winterrieden in Bavaria, which the family was given in compensation for the lost County Rheineck. With Prosper of Sinzendorf on Ernstbrunn (1751–1822), raised to the rank of sovereign imperial prince in 1803, but mediatized to Bavaria in 1806. With the death of Prince Prosper the family died in 1822 in the male line. It was followed by a protracted inheritance dispute that ended in 1828 when Prince Henry LXIV of Reuß-Köstritz took over the rule of Ernstbrunn, whose descendants still have it today.

The younger line also had properties in Austria and Bohemia, Planá, Kočov and so on.

== Heirdom ==
- Between 1630 and 1662 Johann Joachim Freiherr and Count of Sinzendorff was in pledge possession of the county seat located at the lower Inn Ortenburg, as he bought the ruling Count Friedrich Casimir debt instruments.
- In 1654, the counts of Sinzendorf bought the castle county Rheineck as kurkölnisches fief of the barons of Warsberg. This was compensated at the Reichsdeputationshauptschluss including the village Winterrieden in - later Bavarian - Lower Allgäu, with an elevation of this place to a "castle county".
- 1665 the counts of Sinzendorf came into possession of the rule plan in West Bohemia.
- 1654 bought the later Hofkammer president Count George Ludwig von Sinzendorf the county of Neuburg am Inn for 400,000 guilders, which also included the castle Wernstein. The Count had the fortress Neuburg converted into a baroque palace and wanted to expand the county to a significant mercantile center. In 1680, however, Count von Sinzendorf was charged with high treason, lese majeste and other offenses. Then he was relieved of all posts and the county of Neuburg drafted by the Imperial Court Chamber in Vienna.
- 1714 bought the Obersthofkanzler count Philipp Ludwig Wenzel of Sinzendorf the Moravian rule Seelowitz of its Mrs. Rosina Katharina Isabella, born Countess of Waldstein-Wartenberg and her sister Maria Anna Franziska of pair for 660,000 Rhenish guldens. He had between 1722 and 1728 by Joseph Emanuel Fischer von Erlach, the baroque palace Seelowitz built; his three sons already sold it in 1743.
- Between 1723 and 1729 Count Prosper Anton Joseph von Sinzendorf had the castle Trpísty built in Bohemia.
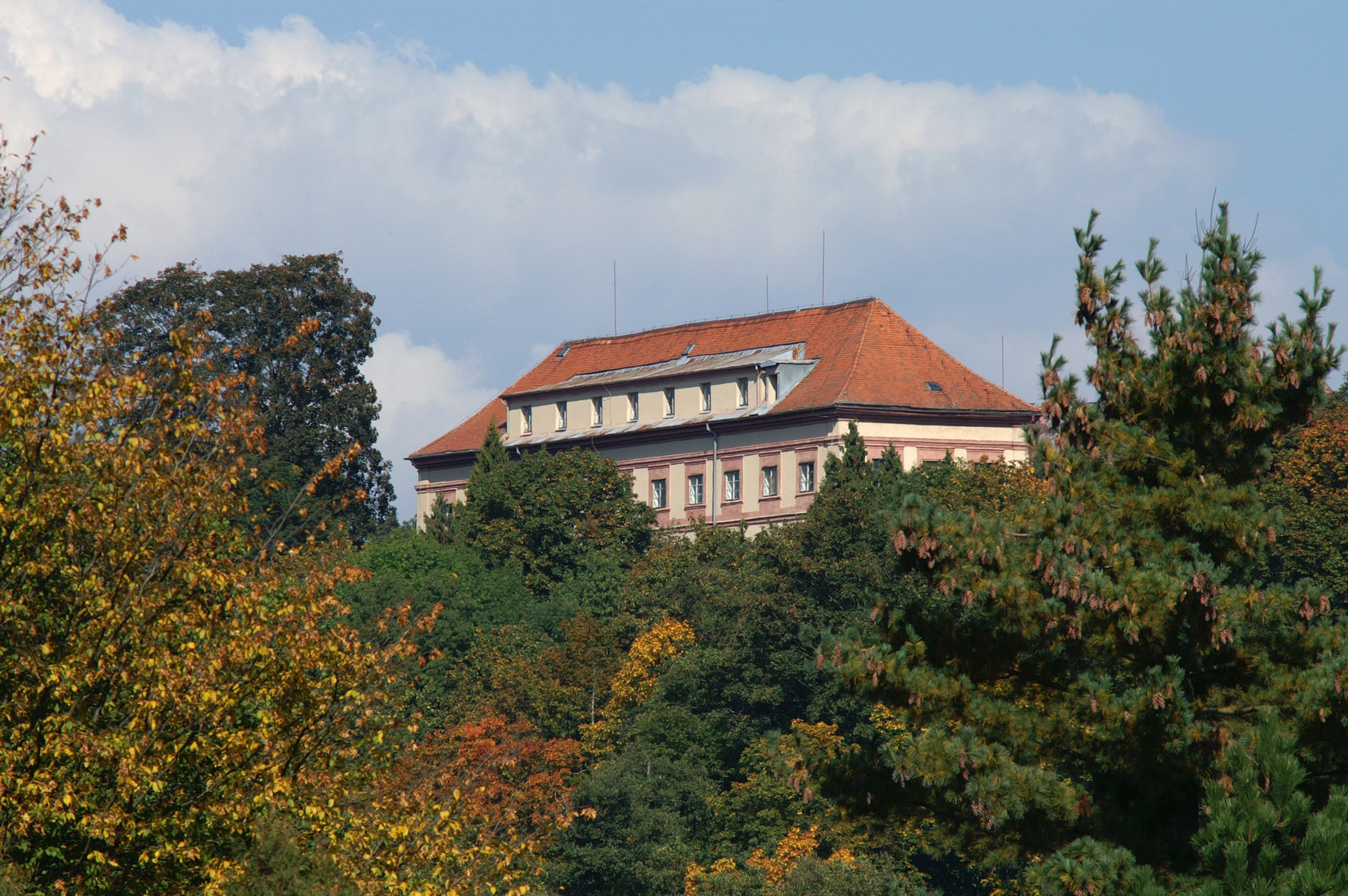
Castle in Planá, Plzeň Region

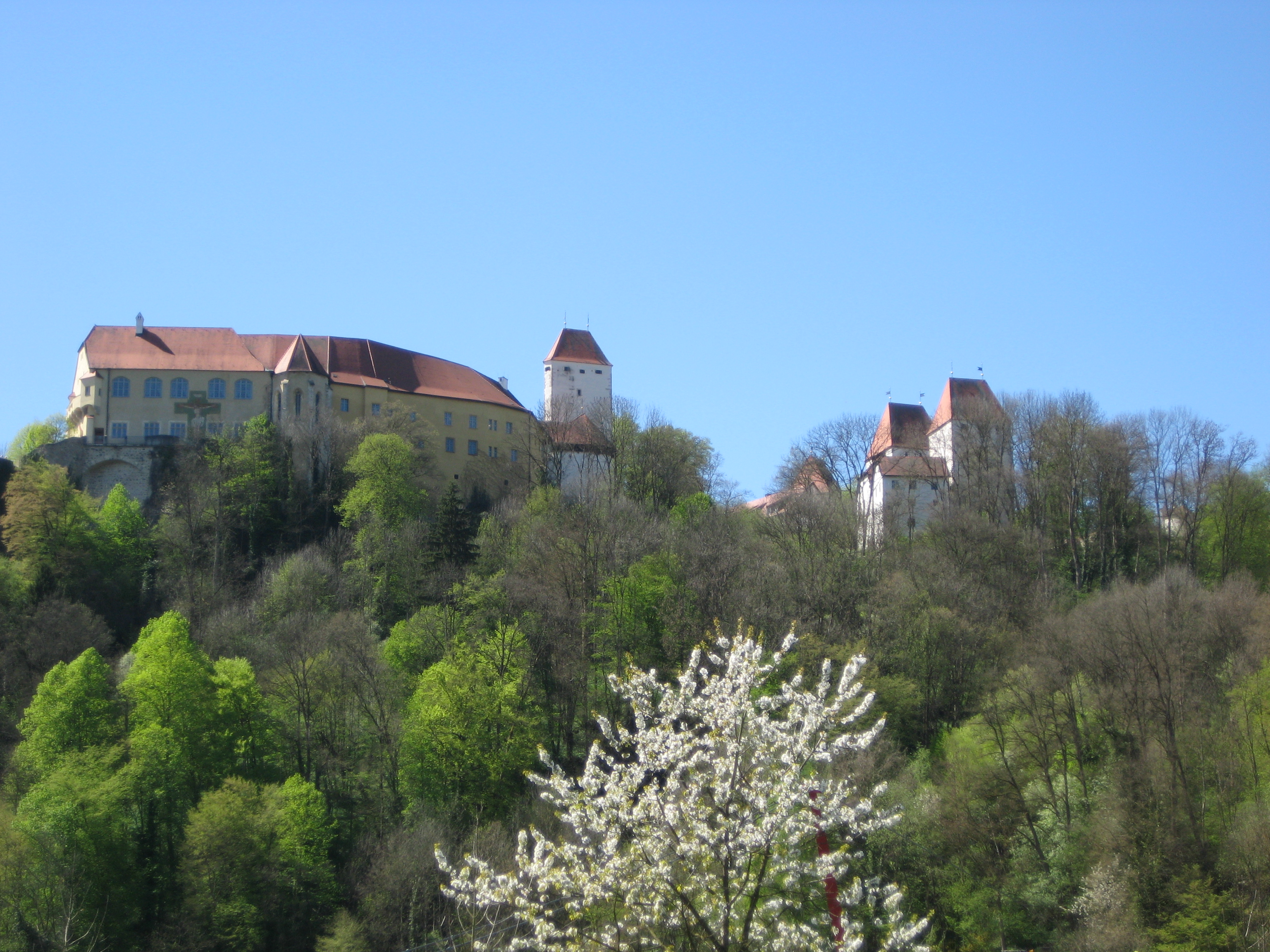
Castle at Neuburg am Inn, Bavaria

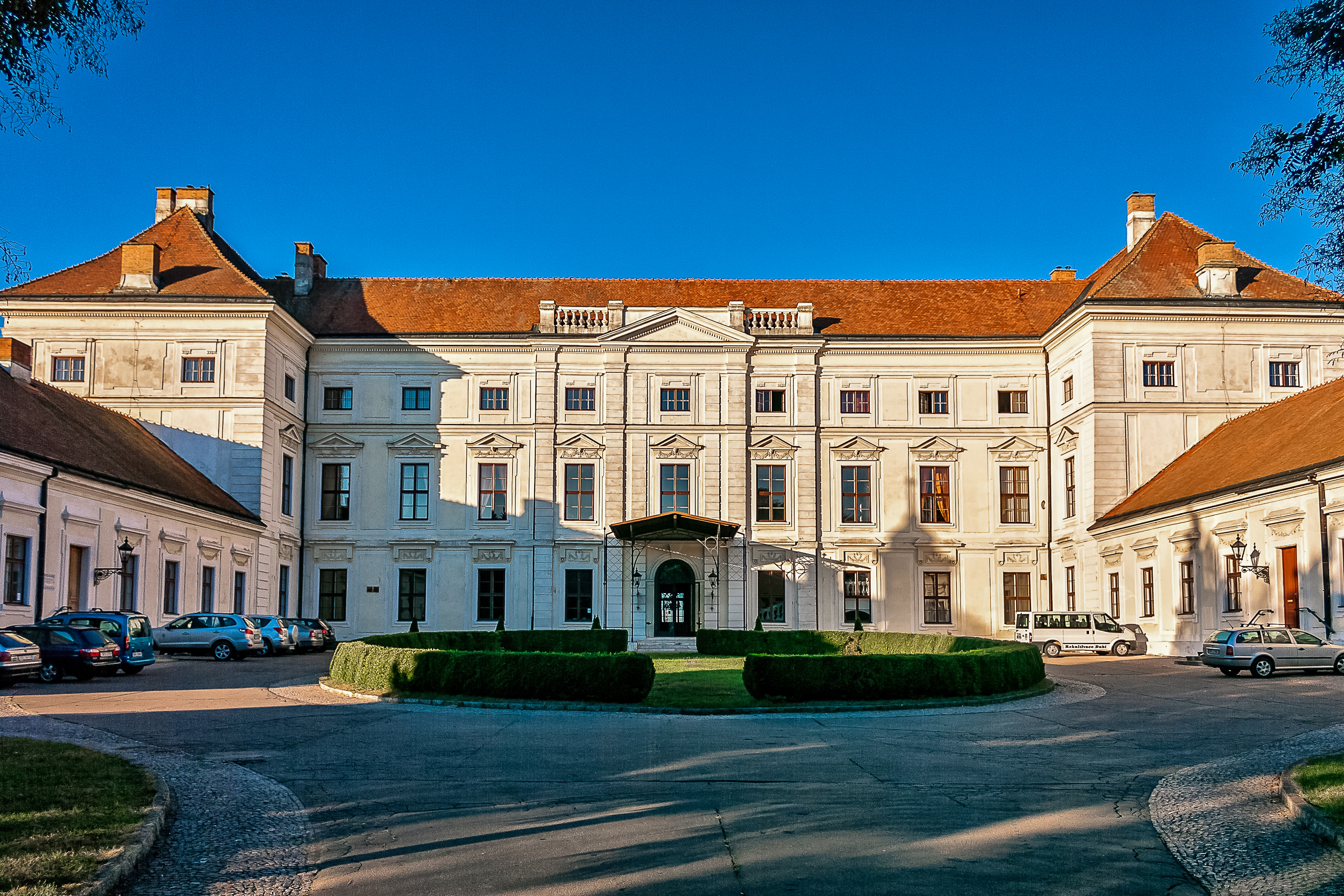
Castle Židlochovice, South Moravian Region

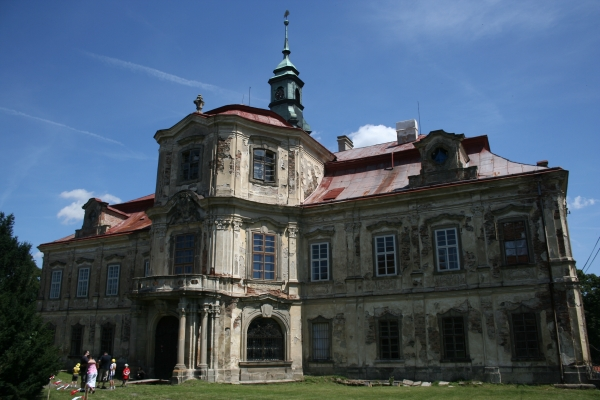
Trpísty Castle, Plzeň Region

== Notable members ==
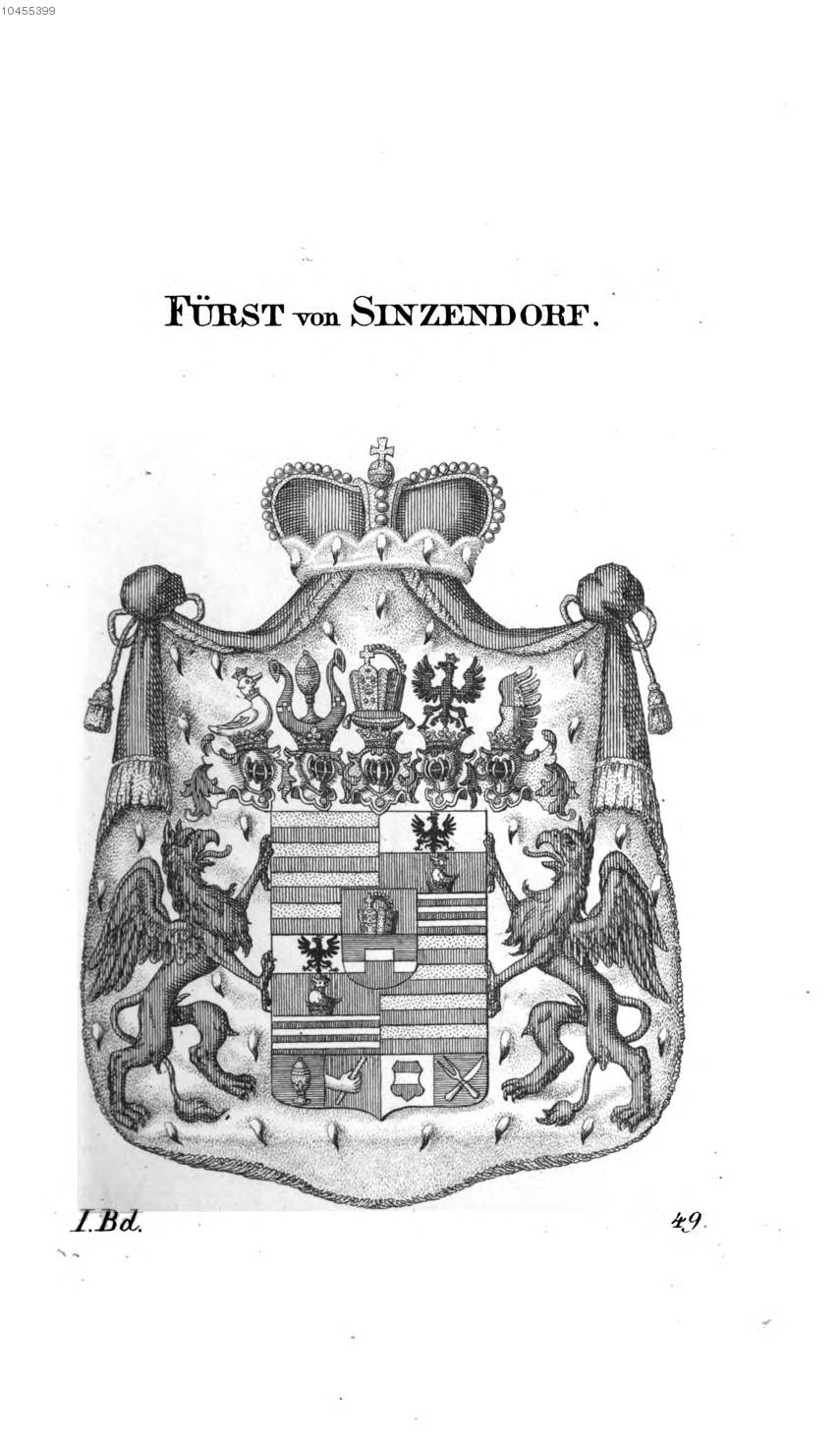
Princely Coat of Arms (1803)

Representatives of the noble family included:

- Johann Joachim von Sinzendorf, owner of the imperial county Ortenburg
- Georg Ludwig von Sinzendorf (1616–1681), Austrian politician, owner of the county Neuburg
- Philipp Ludwig Wenzel von Sinzendorf (1671–1742), Austrian diplomat and Court Chancellor (Obersthofkanzler)
- Philipp Ludwig von Sinzendorf (1699–1747), Bishop of Wroclaw and cardinal of the Catholic Church
- Prosper Anton Josef von Sinzendorf (1700–1756), Austrian noble man and courtier, lord of Trpísty, Counsellor and Chamberlain
- Prosper von Sinzendorf (1751–1822), raised to the rank of prince in 1803, Herr auf Ernstbrunn, dies childless
- Anna von Sinzendorf ( –1842), married Countess of Thurn, in second marriage Marchesa Pannochieschi Countess d'Elci, sister of the previous, last Countess of Sinzendorf
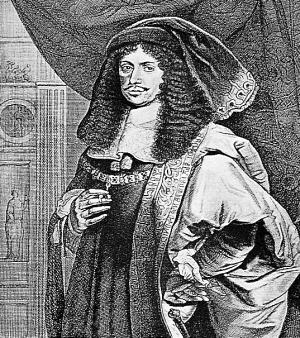
Georg Ludwig von Sinzendorf (1616–1681)

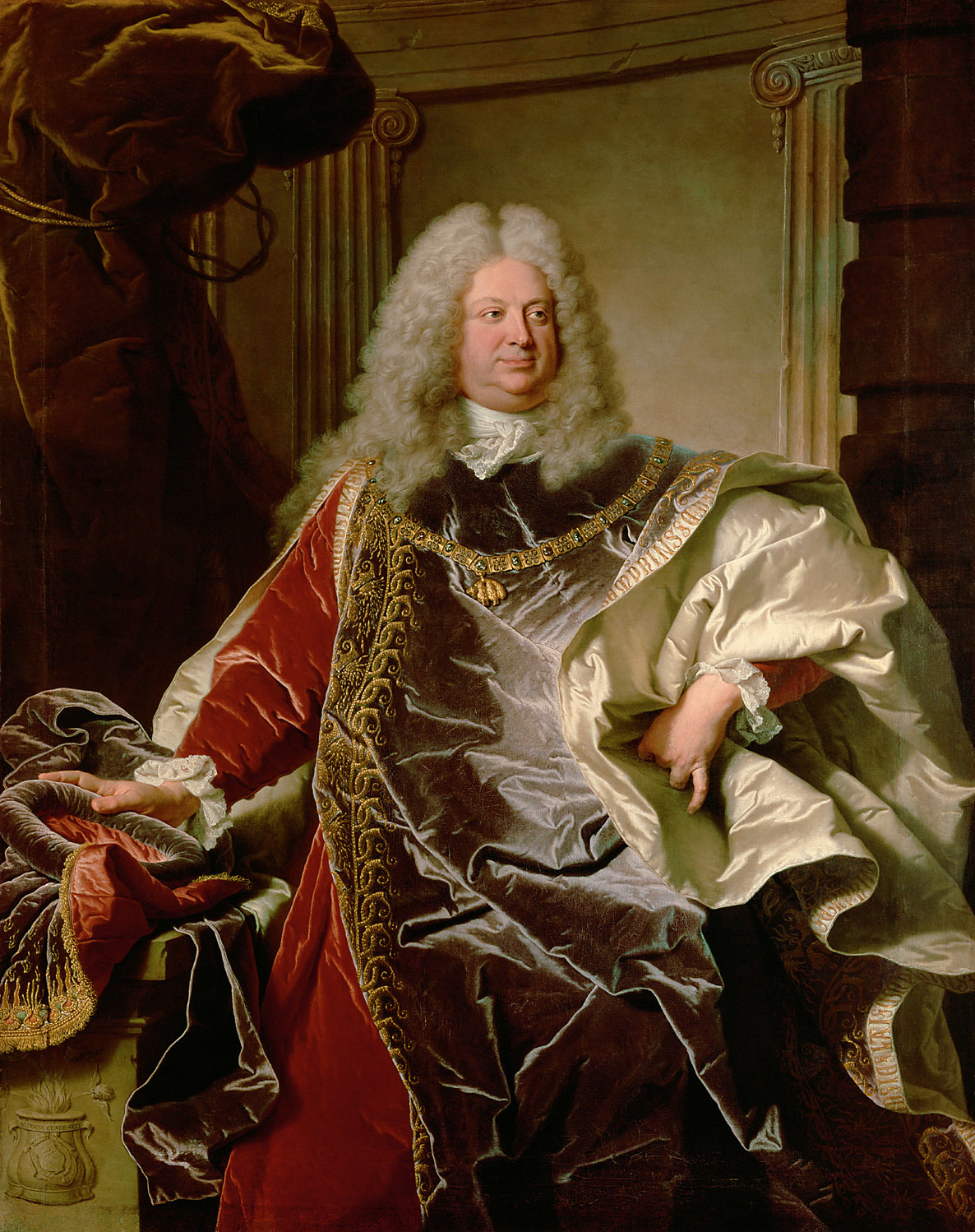
Philipp Ludwig Wenzel von Sinzendorf (1671–1742)

== See also ==
- Lapčan family
- Kurjaković family

== Literature ==
- Constantin von Wurzbach: Sinzendorf, die Grafen und Fürsten, Genealogie. In: Biographisches Lexikon des Kaiserthums Oesterreich. 35. Theil. Kaiserlich-königliche Hof- und Staatsdruckerei, Wien 1877, pg. 13–15.
- Constantin von Wurzbach: Sinzendorf, die Grafen und Fürsten, Wappen. In: Biographisches Lexikon des Kaiserthums Oesterreich. 35. Theil. Kaiserlich-königliche Hof- und Staatsdruckerei, Wien 1877, pg. 24.
