= Jakub Auguston =

Czech architect

- Jakub Auguston mladší
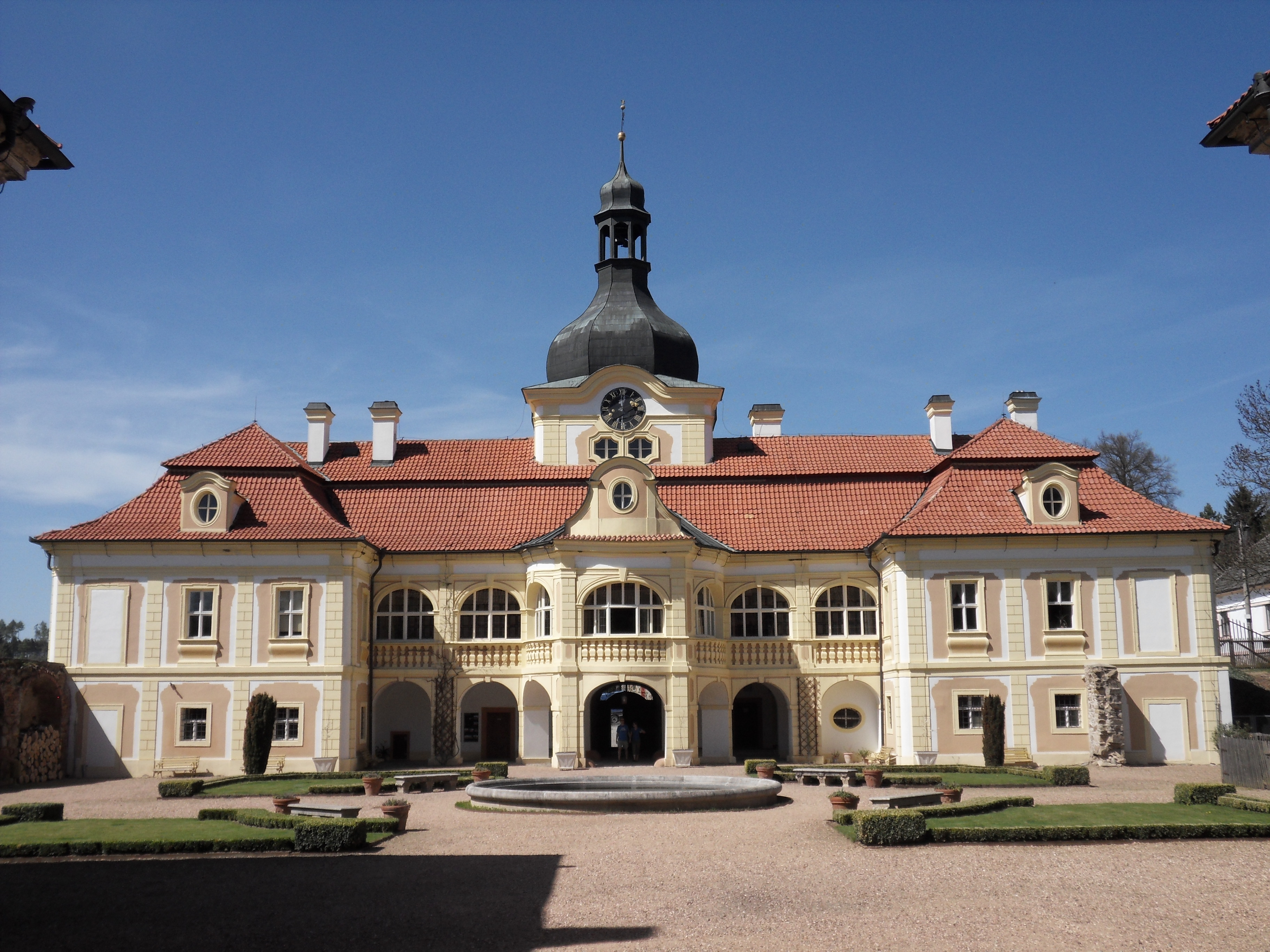
- Nebílovy Castle, an Auguston's work
- Born: Giacomo Agustoni c. 1665–1670; Rome, Papal States
- Died: 3 February 1735 (aged 64–70); Plzeň, Bohemia, Habsburg monarchy
- Occupation: architect

Jakub Auguston Jr. (born Giacomo Agustoni; c. 1665–1670 – 3 August 1735) was a Czech Baroque architect of Italian descent. He lived in Plzeň and worked in entire West Bohemia.

== Life ==
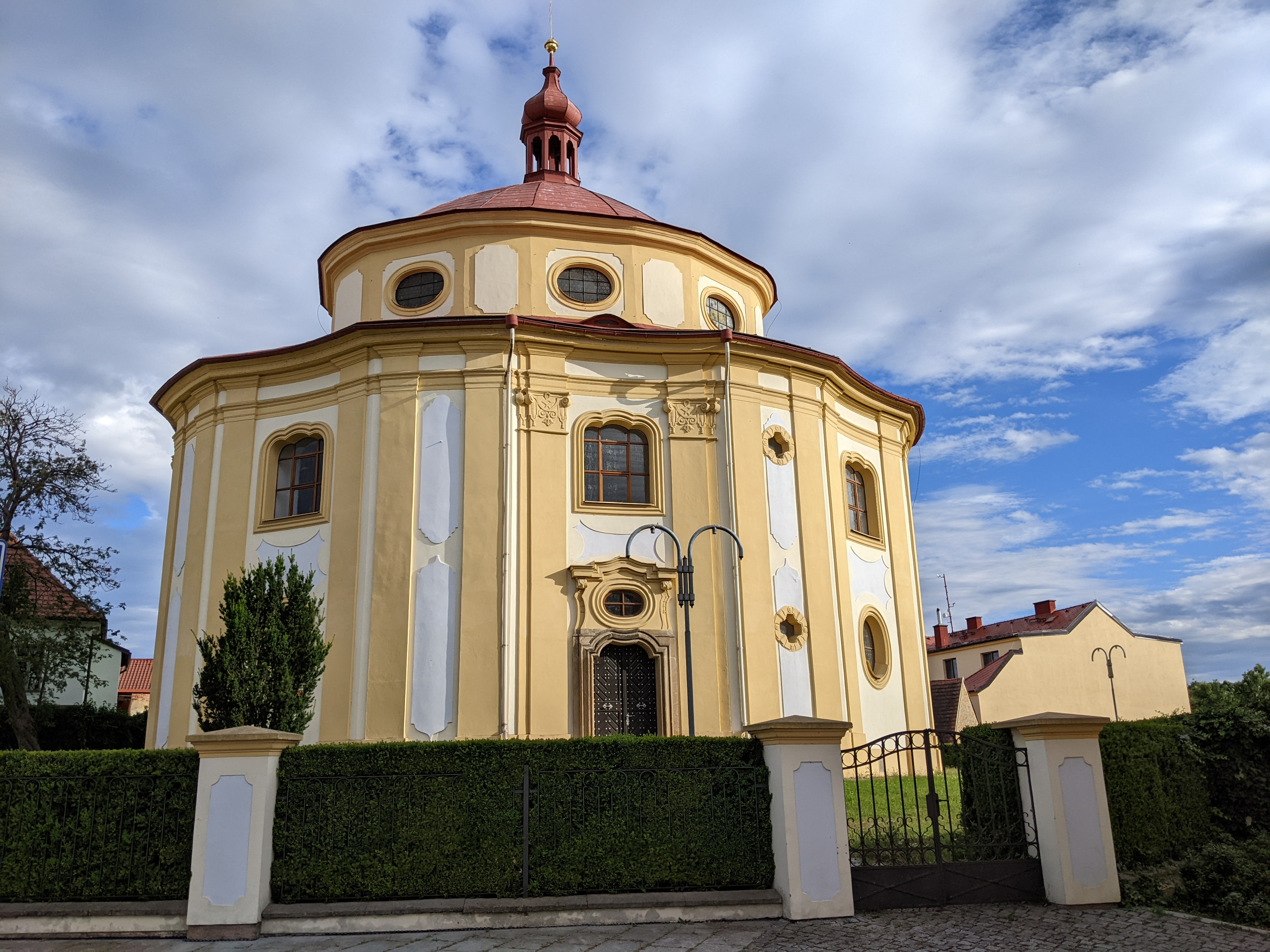
Church of Saint Vitus in Dobřany

Giacomo Agustoni was born in Rome between 1665 and 1670 (some sources specify that it was in 1665 or 1670, others state 1668) He was member of a branched family of Italian bricklayers and builders active in Bohemia from the first half of the 17th century. He was the nephew of the builder Jakub Auguston Sr., who lived in Plzeň from 1661. His uncle invited him to Plzeň and from then on Giacomo Agustoni was known as Jakub Auguston Jr. (Czech: Jakub Auguston mladší)

In 1692 or 1694, Auguston Jr. became a burgher of the city of Plzeň. Auguston Jr. worked with his uncle until his uncle's death in 1701 and then took over his workshop. A year before his death, Auguston Jr. built a magnificent house in Plzeň. He died in this house on 3 August 1735. He was buried in the Church of Saint Anne in Plzeň.

Auguston Jr. had two sons, Václav (1705–1758) and Josef (1717–1784). Václav worked for his father in the workshop and Josef also briefly worked as a builder before becoming a farmer.

== Work ==
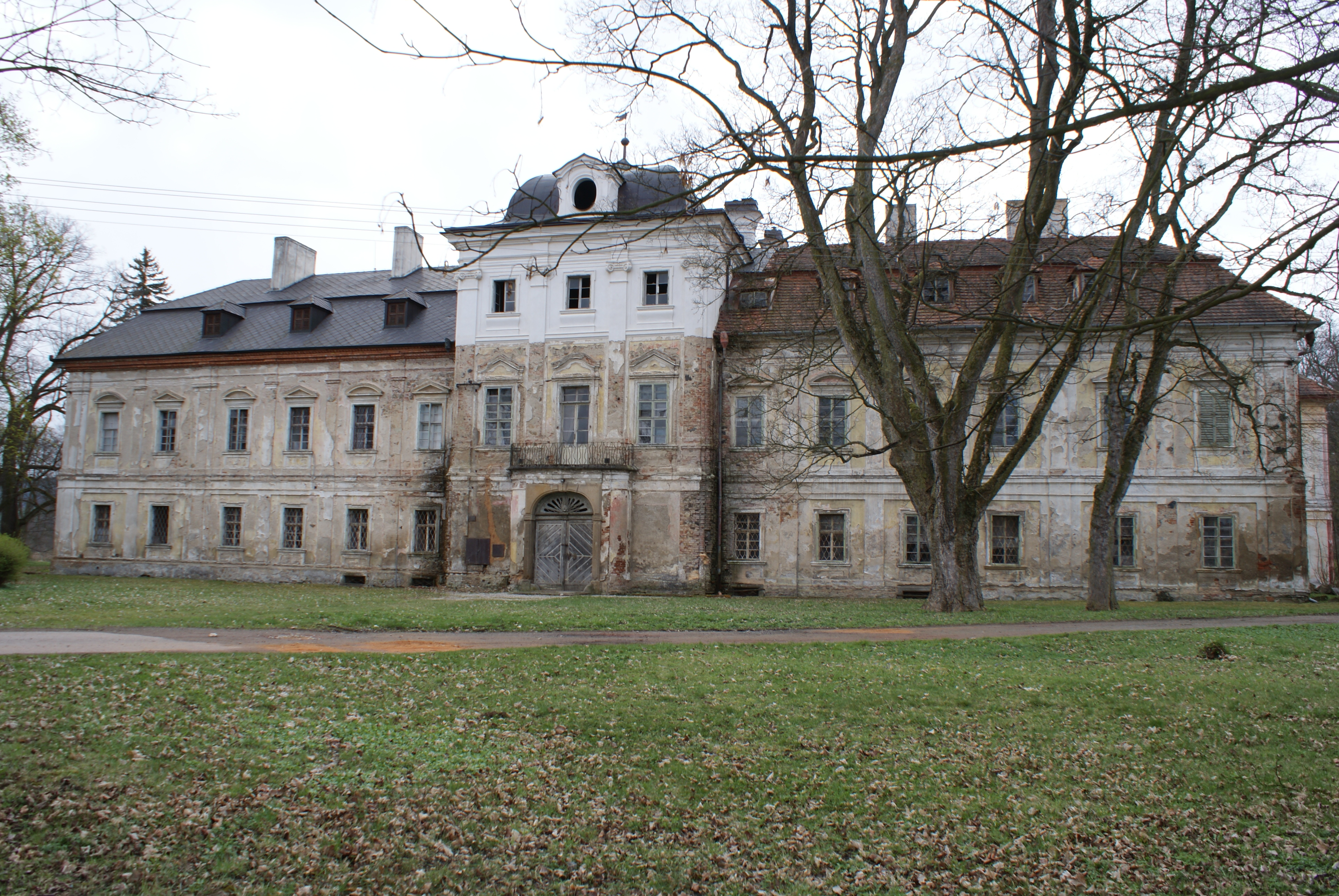
Dolní Lukavice Castle

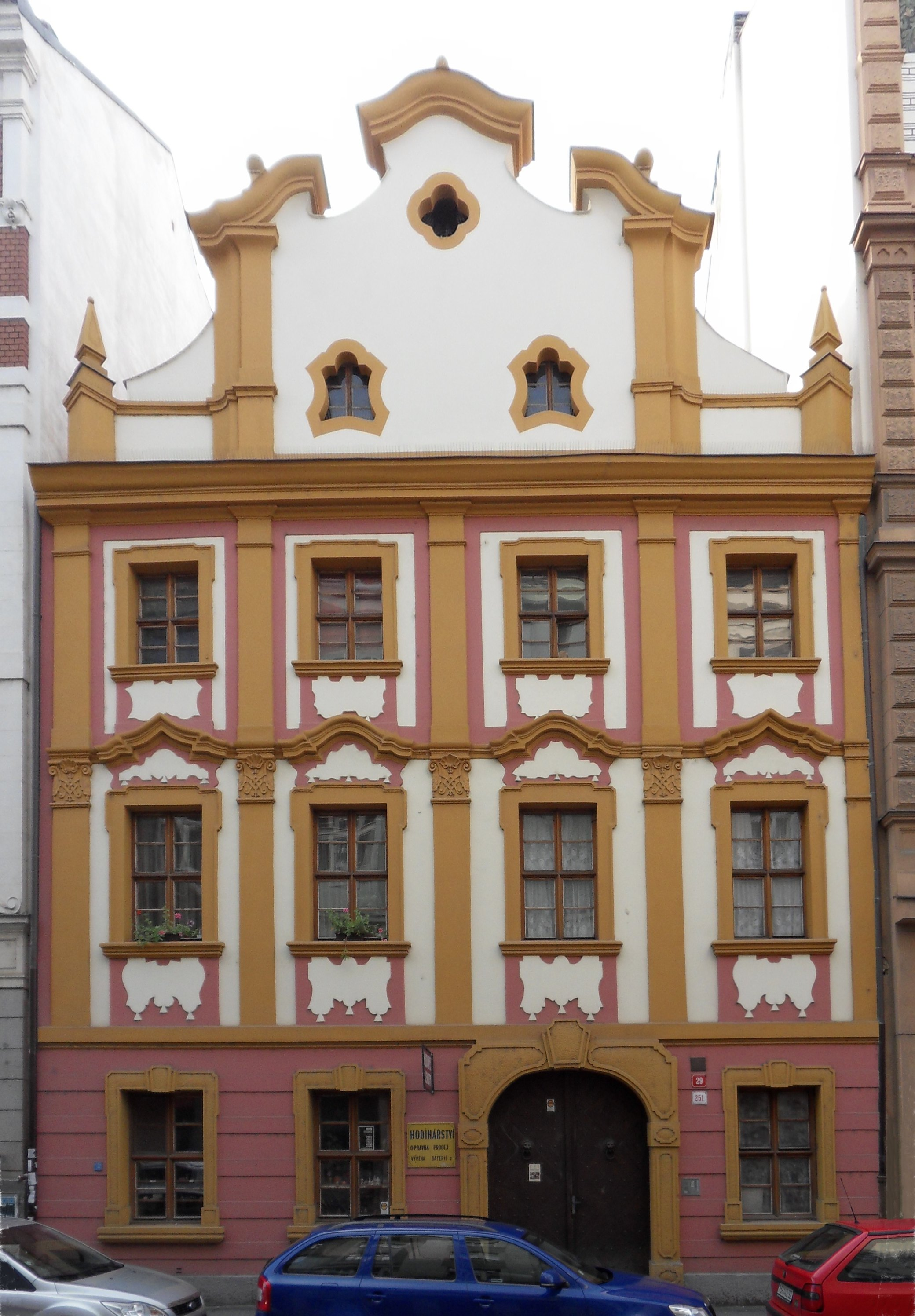
Auguston House in Sedláčkova street in Plzeň

Jakub Auguston Jr. is one of the typical representatives of Czech Baroque architecture. He is the author of many burgher houses, churches and castles in West Bohemia. The Church of Saint Vitus in Dobřany is considered one of his most beautiful works. There are several of his houses in the historic centre of Plzeň, which is protected as an urban monument reservation. Notable is the house in Sedláčkova Street, which he built for himself and his son Václav.

His notable works include:

=== Castles ===
- Nebílovy Castle in Nebílovy (1705–1719; designed by Johann Lukas von Hildebrandt)
- Dolní Lukavice Castle in Dolní Lukavice (1707–1728)
- Bušovice Castle in Bušovice (c. 1710; probable author)
- Příchovice Castle in Příchovice (1718–1719)
- Kolinec Castle in Kolinec (1721; probable author)
- Trpísty Castle in Trpísty (1729; probable author)
- Malesice Castle in Plzeň (c. 1730)

=== Church buildings ===
- Church of the Assumption of the Virgin Mary in Osek (1707)
- Archdeaconry (today bishopric) in Plzeň (c. 1710; reconstruction)
- Rectory in Dýšina (1712)
- Dominican Monastery (today Study and Scientific Library of the Plzeň Region) with Church of Saints Anne in Plzeň, where Auguston is buried (1712)
- Church of Saint Wenceslaus in Radnice (c. 1720; reconstruction)
- Church of Saint Peter and Paul in Dolní Lukavice (1722; reconstruction, probable author)
- Franciscan Monastery in Plzeň (1722–1724; western façade of the monastery church)
- Church of Saint John of Nepomuk in Nové Mitrovice (1722–1726; probable author)
- Church of Saint Vitus in Dobřany (1727–1734)
- Chotěšov Abbey in Chotěšov (1737–1756; project finished by other builders)
