= Franciscan Monastery, Plzeň =

Coordinates: 49°44′43.3″N 13°22′43.7″E

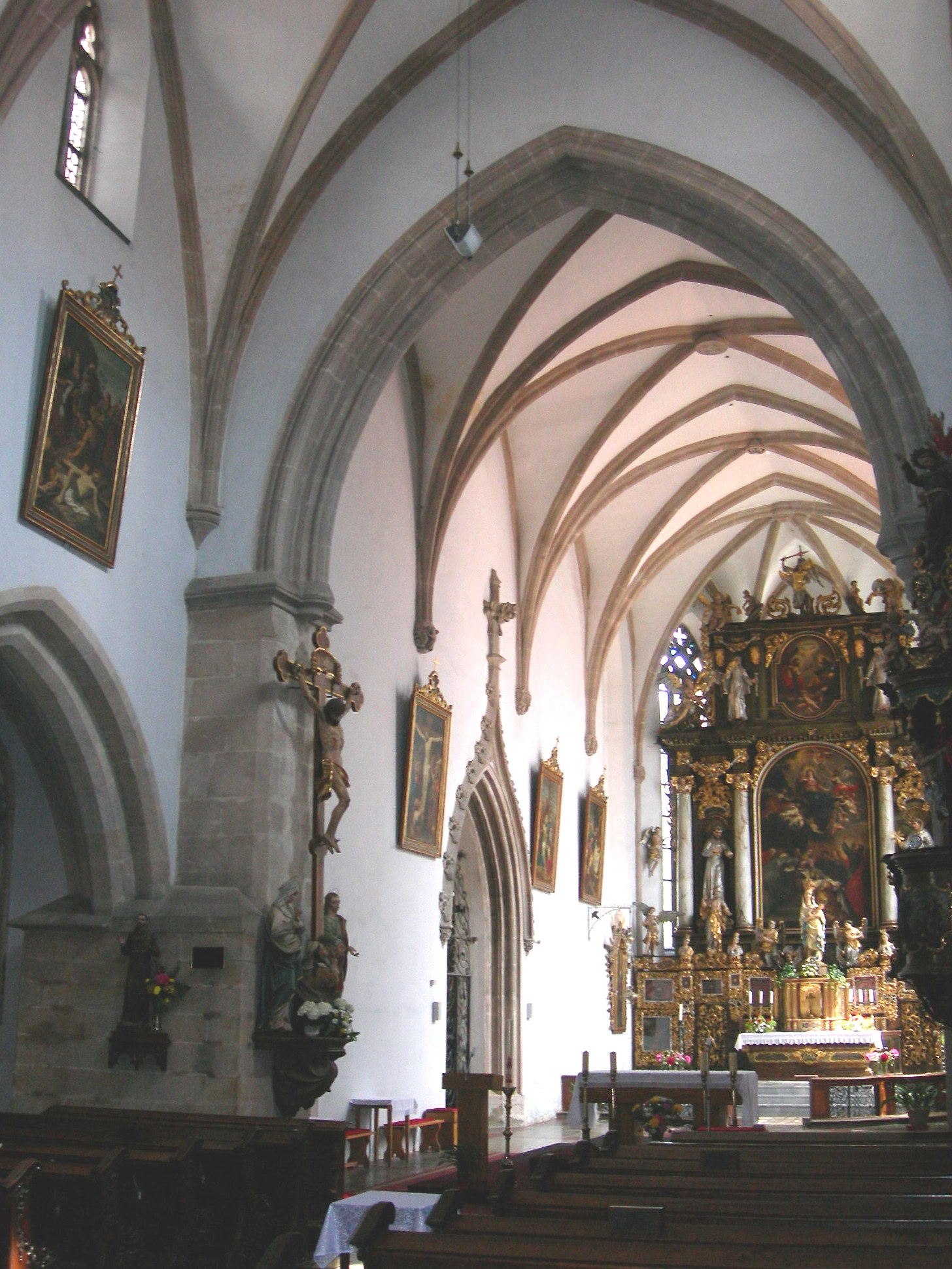
Interior of Church of Assumption of Virgin Mary

The Franciscan Monastery (Czech: Františkánský klášter) is located near the Main Square in Plzeň, Czech Republic. Originally belonging to the Minorites, the later Franciscan monastery was founded at the end of the 13th century. The Church of the Assumption of the Virgin Mary, Chapterhouse and Chapel of St. Barbara also belong to the monastery complex.

The Franciscan church and monastery are among the city's oldest buildings and, for all the calamities of the Hussite era and Thirty Years' War, have, in essence, preserved their original early Gothic form.

== History ==
The monastery, which originally belonged to the Minorites, dates back to around the 1295 foundation of Plzeň by King Wencleslaus II. The complex grew out in a southeastern direction from the new city ramparts.

The oldest parts of the monastery, from 1300, are the walls of the pentagonal presbytery and the eastern part of the triple nave. Later on, the rest of the triple nave and the intermediate arcade were built. The monastery was vaulted bit by bit: the presbytery and the triple nave after 1350, the eastern part of the cloister around 1360, and the remaining parts by 1380.

The Minorites were banished from the monastery for a few months on the initiative of the radical Hussite priest Václav Koranda.

The monastery was damaged by fire during the 1433–1444 Hussite siege of Plzeň, and repaired by donations over the next 50 years.

On the command of Pope Pius II, the Franciscans took over the monastery.

The tower of the church was built at the end of the 16th century, and in 1611 an additional chapel was built and consecrated to the Holy Trinity. In 1618, Plzeň came under siege by the army of the Czech aristocracy under the command of Lord Mansfield, and the monastery was damaged again.

At the end of the 17th century, when the monastic community was at its peak, Jakub Auguston Sr. designed and built the Chapel of St. Anthony next to the north nave of the church, as well as a new monastery wing for novices. His nephew Jakub Auguston Jr. was the architect of the western facade of the monastery church, from 1722 to 1724.

During the Josephine reforms, while the community was not disbanded, its population declined.

The monastery continued to be remodeled throughout the 19th century and into the 1930s. In May 1950, the monastic community was forcibly disbanded by the socialist government as part of Action K. The empty buildings were used as a children's home and, later, as the Museum of West Bohemia in Plzeň. In 1989, with the change of the political regime, the monastery was returned to the Roman Catholic Church, which began to renovate the buildings based on the architectural concepts by Jan Soukup.

The Franciscans returned to Plzeň in 1996 according to the wishes of bishop Františk Radkovský. The small community settled in an apartment in Vinice. Later, they bought the former kindergarten in Lochotín and it was adapted into the pastoral centre Domeček.

Today, the monastery holds the Museum of Christian Art of the Plzeň Diocese, as well as service apartments for people in charge of the diocese and regular nuns. Unoccupied parts are used for various purposes by the Parish of Cathedral of St. Bartholomew and the Plzeň Bishopric.

== Architecture ==
=== Church of the Assumption of the Virgin Mary ===
The triple nave of the church is illuminated by small double windows from the late Gothic period, featuring different types of traceries. It has a groin vault with ogee arches, ending on the eastern side in a triumphal arch supported by semi-pillars. Monumental Gothic arcades separate the aisles from the nave. The south aisle is directly connected to the monastic cloister, while the north aisle connects to the chapel of St. Anthony.

The long rectangular chancel is also cross-vaulted, ending in a sexpartite vault. The original columns remain inside the triumphal arch. Corbels are decorated with plant and animal motifs. The pillars on the outside of the chancel date to the early Gothic period.

A chapel on the north side of the chancel, dedicated to the Holy Trinity, was built in 1611, and stands on the foundation of the original Gothic chapel. A Baroque tower reinforced by supportive pillars, also on the north side of the chancel, is from 1676. The sacristy, on the south side of the chancel, is once again cross-vaulted, with bosses.

The main altar, from 1698, is in a Baroque style. There is a 1636 copy of a Peter Paul Rubens painting. On the tabernacle is a Gothic Franciscan Madonna dated around 1420. On the side altar is a relief of St. Anne from 1525.

=== Cloister ===
The cloister, like the church, has cross-vaulting, sometimes with bosses. It is built around a square central garden, which can be seen through Gothic windows, and accessed from the western wing through a doorway with a shouldered arch.

In the eastern part of the cloister, there is a late Gothic pulpit, from 1543, and a small scriptorium. In some parts of the cloister, late Gothic frescoes can still be seen.

=== Chapterhouse and Chapel of St. Barbara ===
The square chapterhouse can be entered from the eastern wing of the cloister by three Gothic portals. The Unusually, it is also connected to the chancel of the Chapel of St. Barbara.

The chapterhouse has a stellar vault with ogee ribs and simple geometric corbels, built in 1460 to replace the original 14th-century vault which was destroyed by fire during the Hussite Wars. In the presbytery, the original vaulting survives, with a cross-vault and a pentagonal finish. The chapel and the eastern side of the chapterhouse are illuminated by two-part Gothic windows with simple tracery.

The presbytery is separated from the nave by a triumphal Gothic arch. Late Gothic scenes from the life of St. Barbara from after 1460 can still be found on the walls and the vaults.

=== Other rooms in the monastery ===
Until the 18th-century modifications, the kitchen was built as one large open room with a smoke pipe intake over the whole plan. In 1697, the refectory was rebuilt in a Gothic style and connected to the kitchen; a novice wing was built at the same time.

== Gallery ==
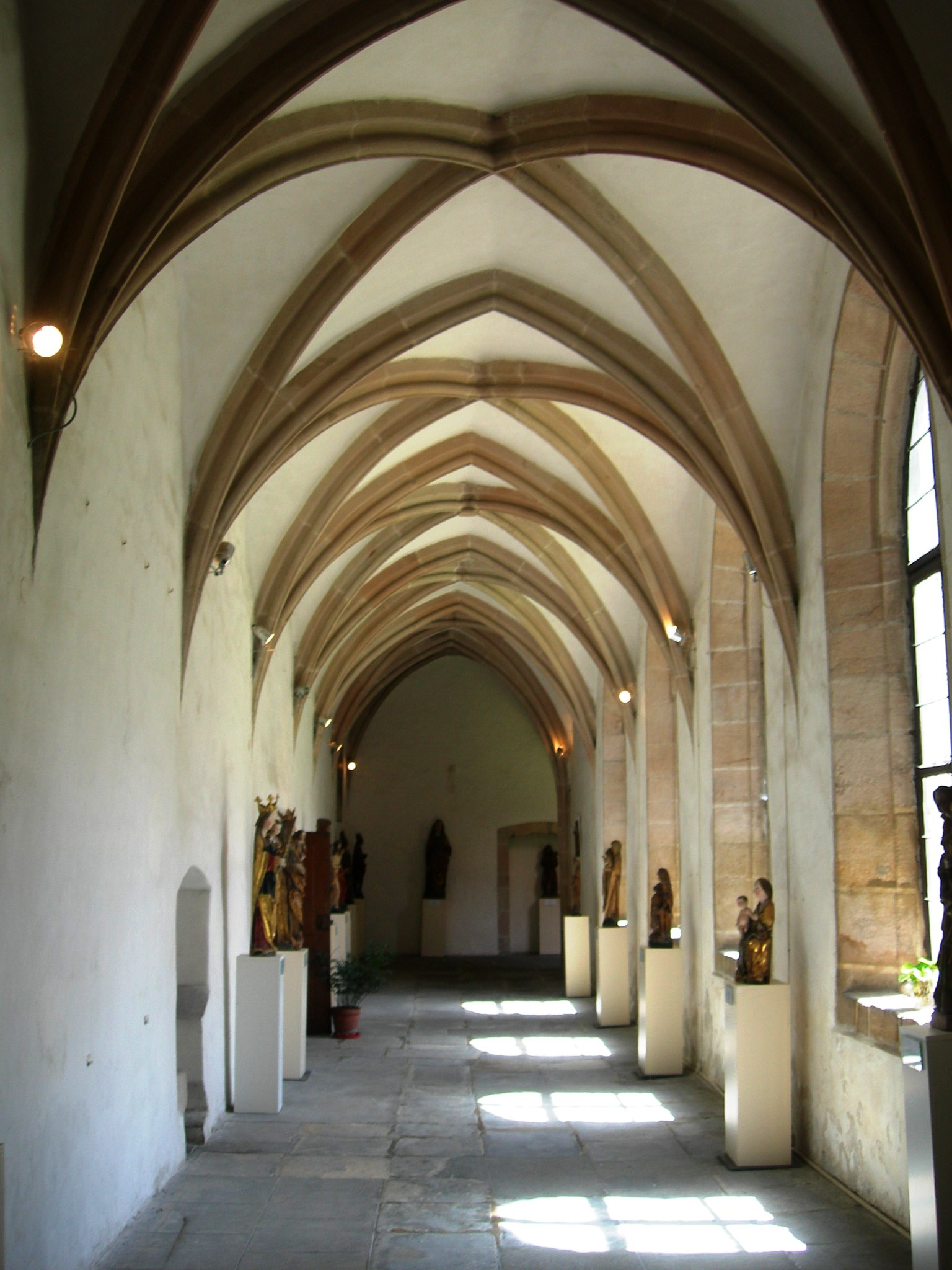
Cloister with exposition of Church Art Museum

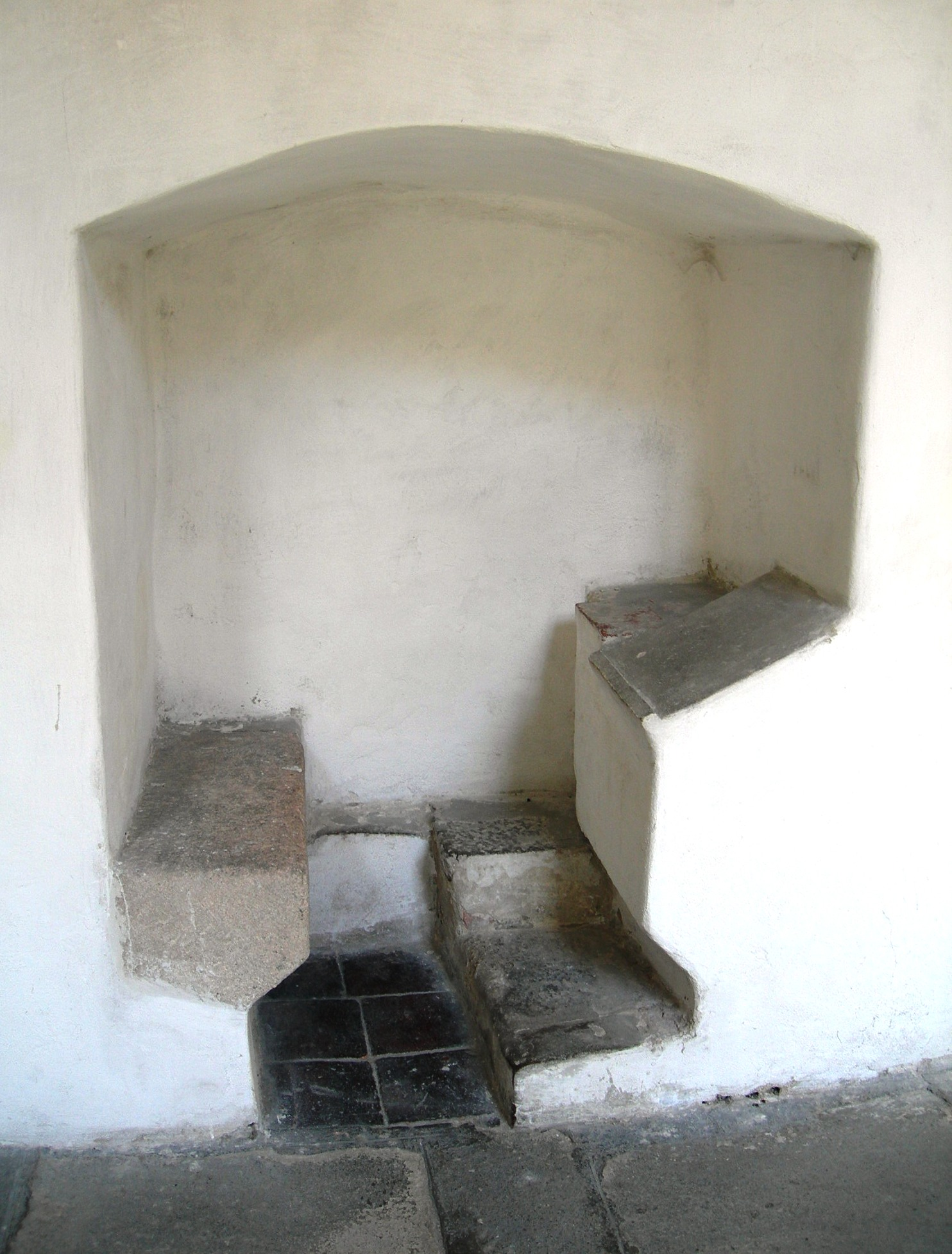
Scriptorium

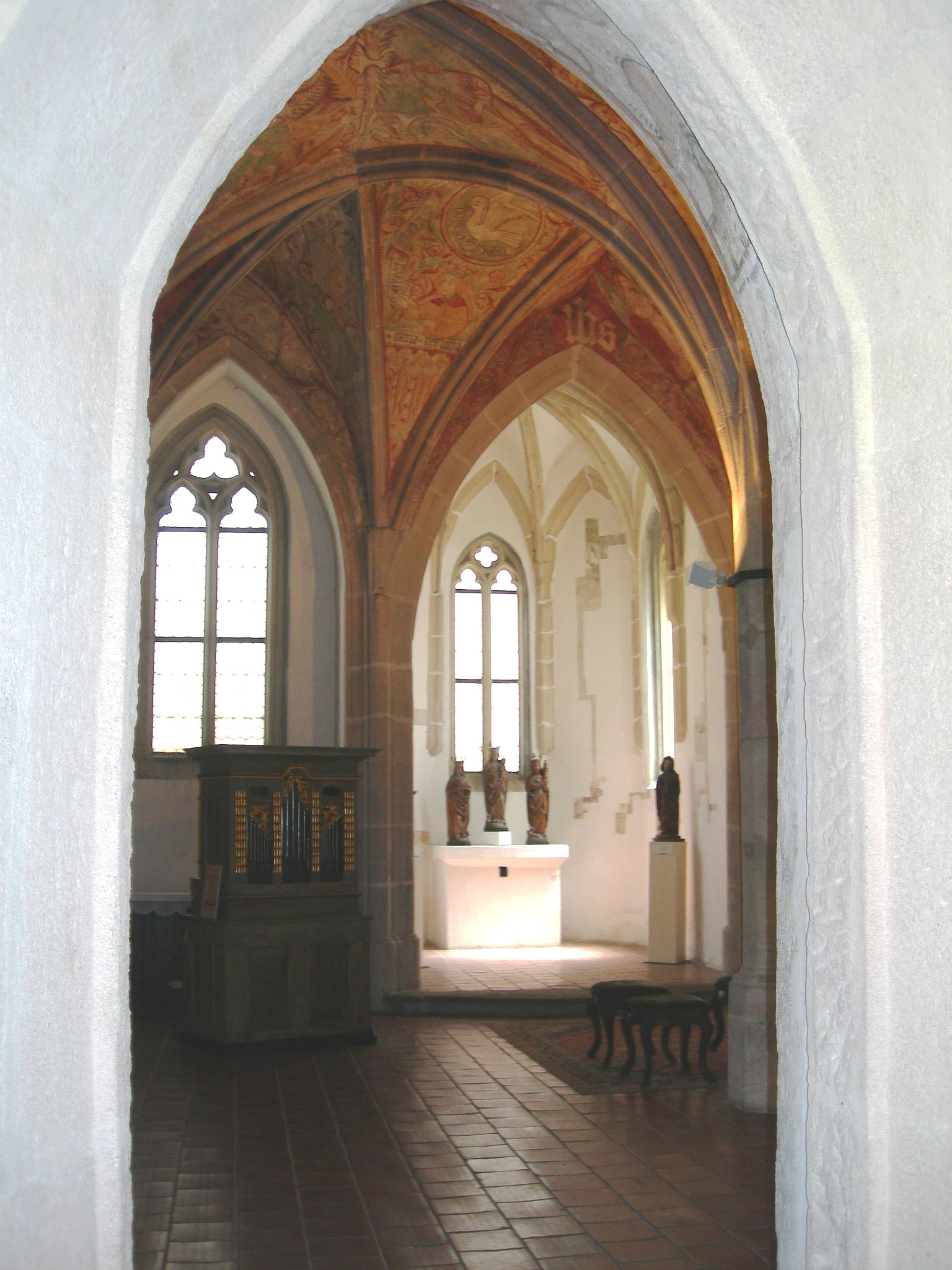
Chapterhouse

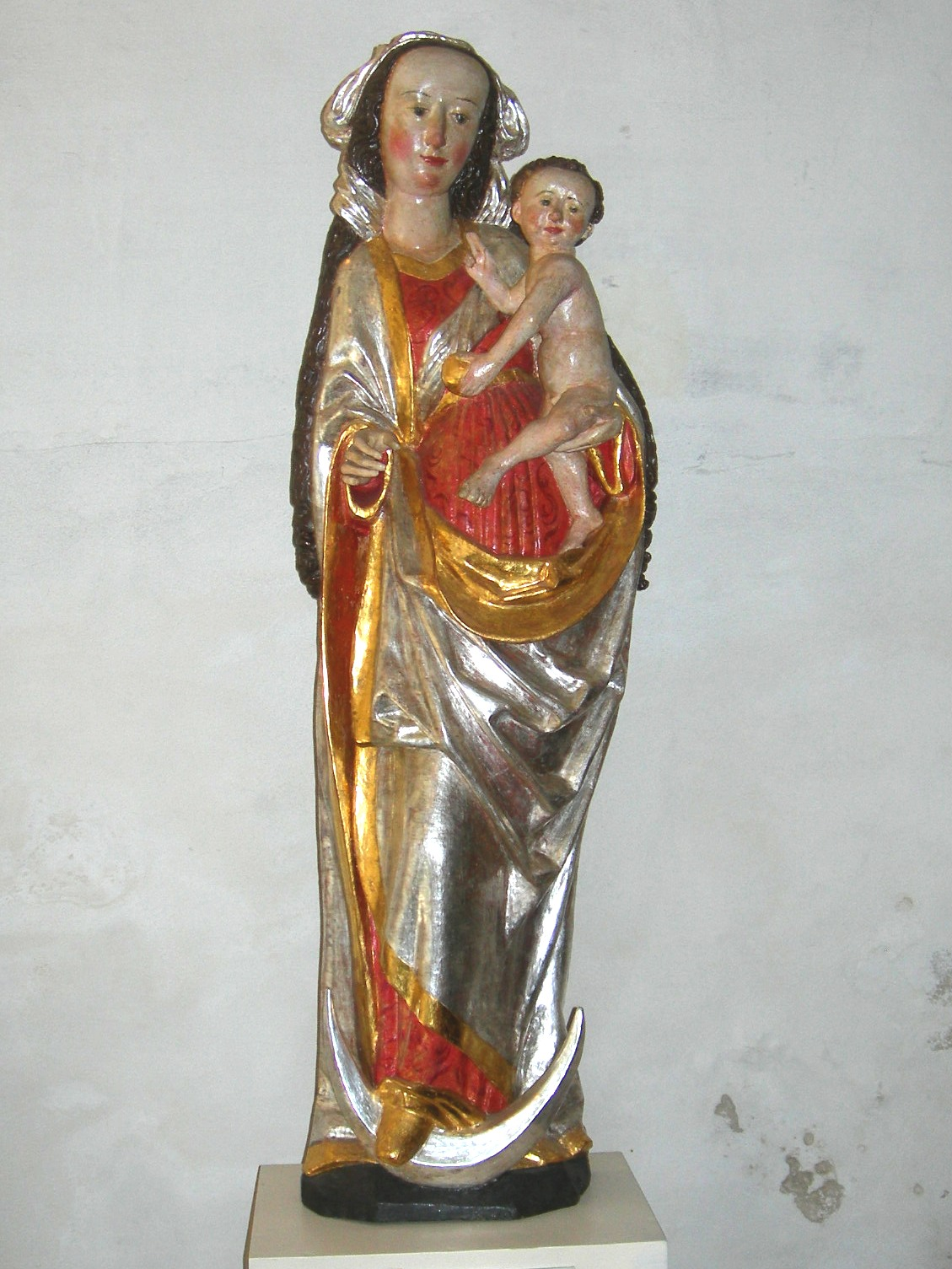
Gothic Franciscan Madonna

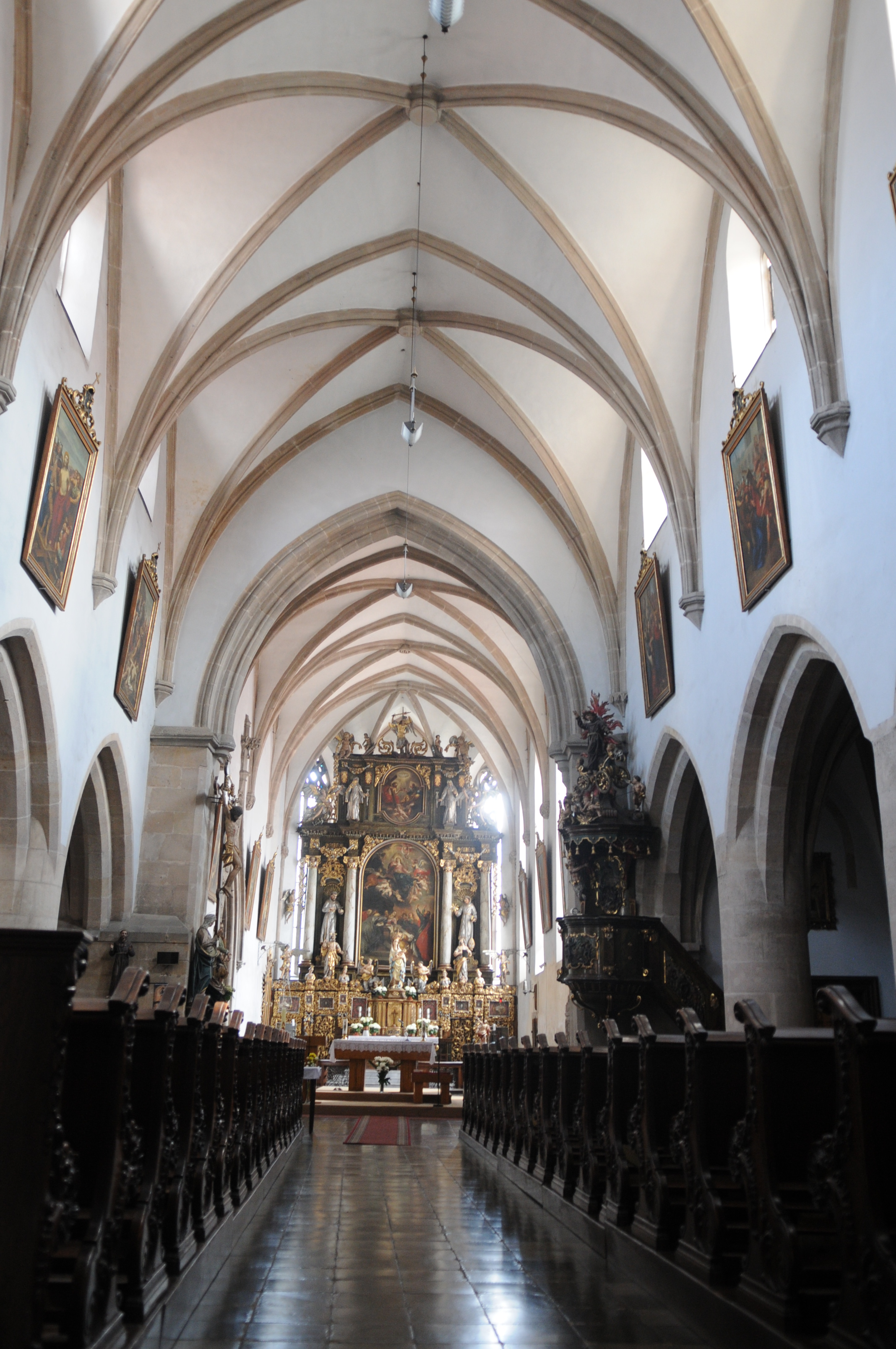
Church of Assumption of Virgin Mary

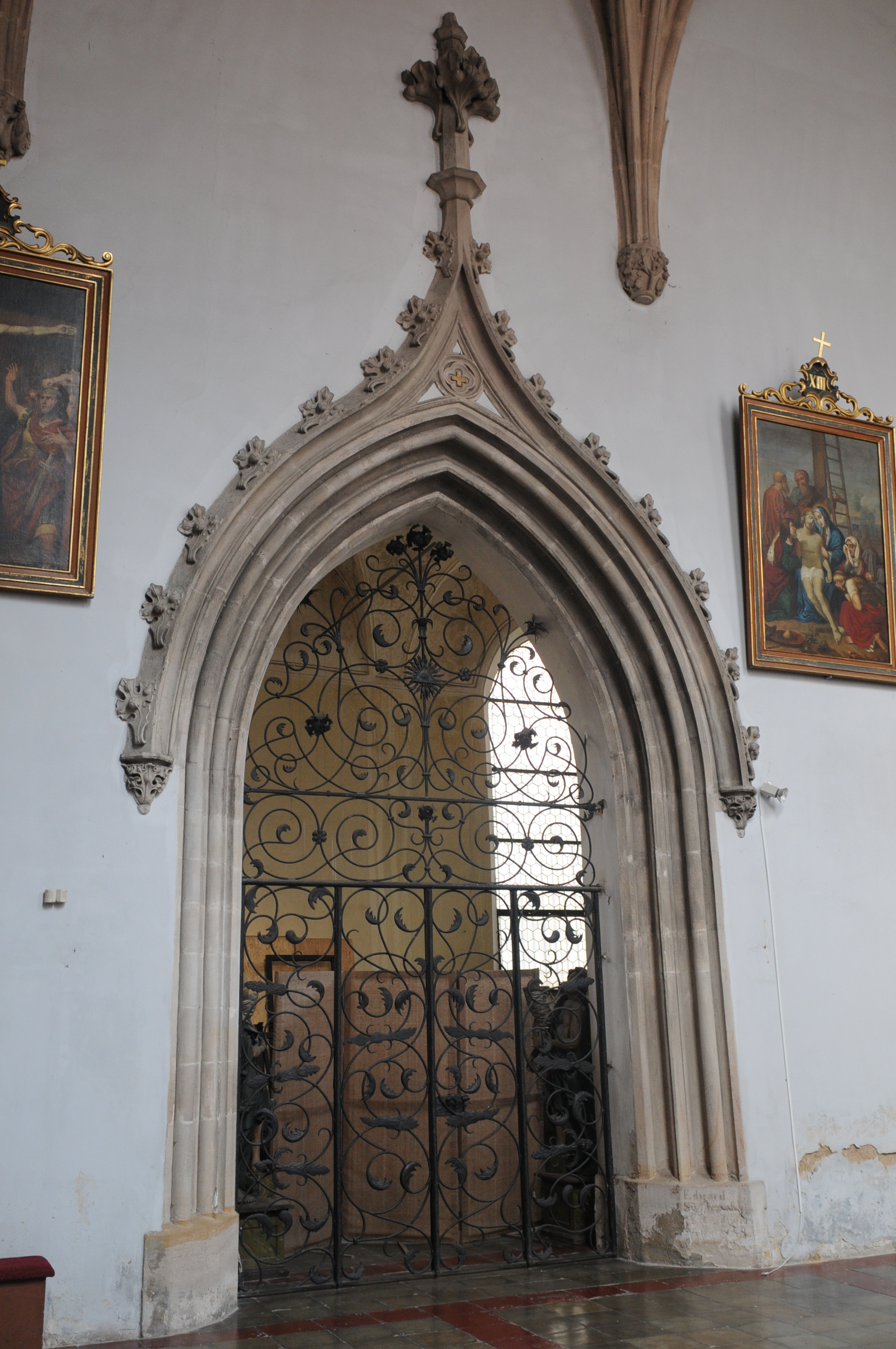
Portal in chancel leading to Chapel of Holy Trinity

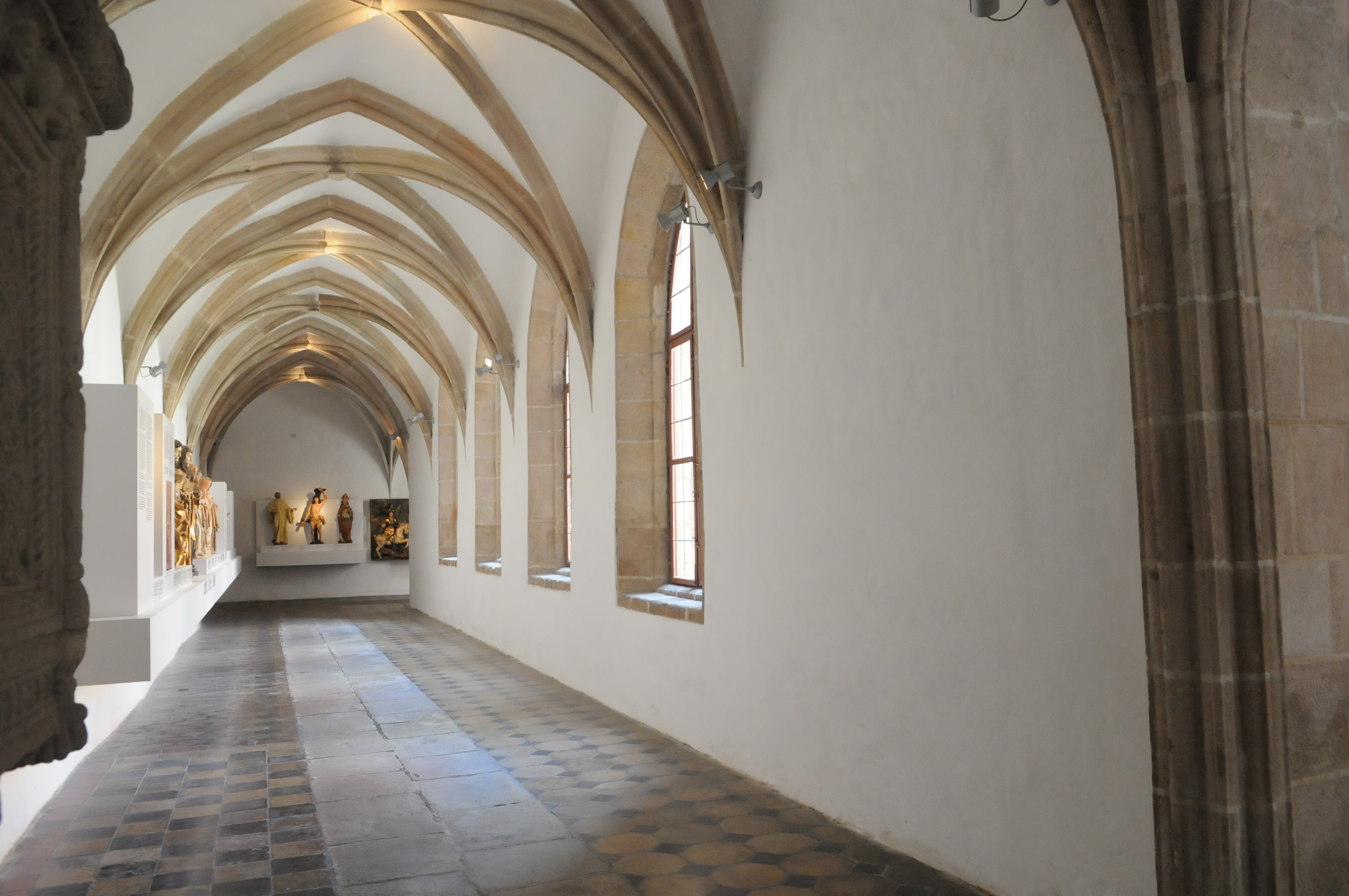
Eastern wing

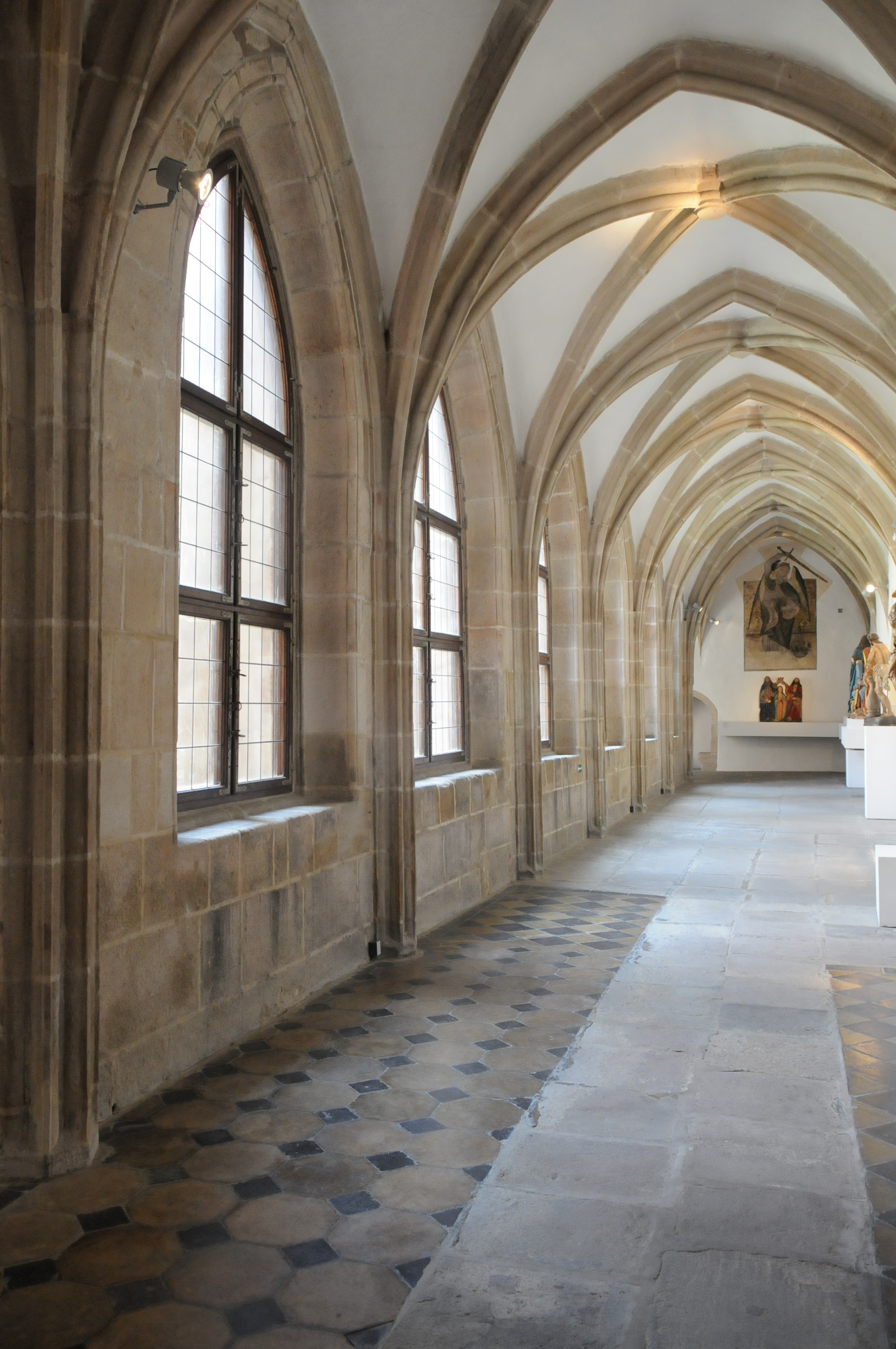
Cloister eastern wing

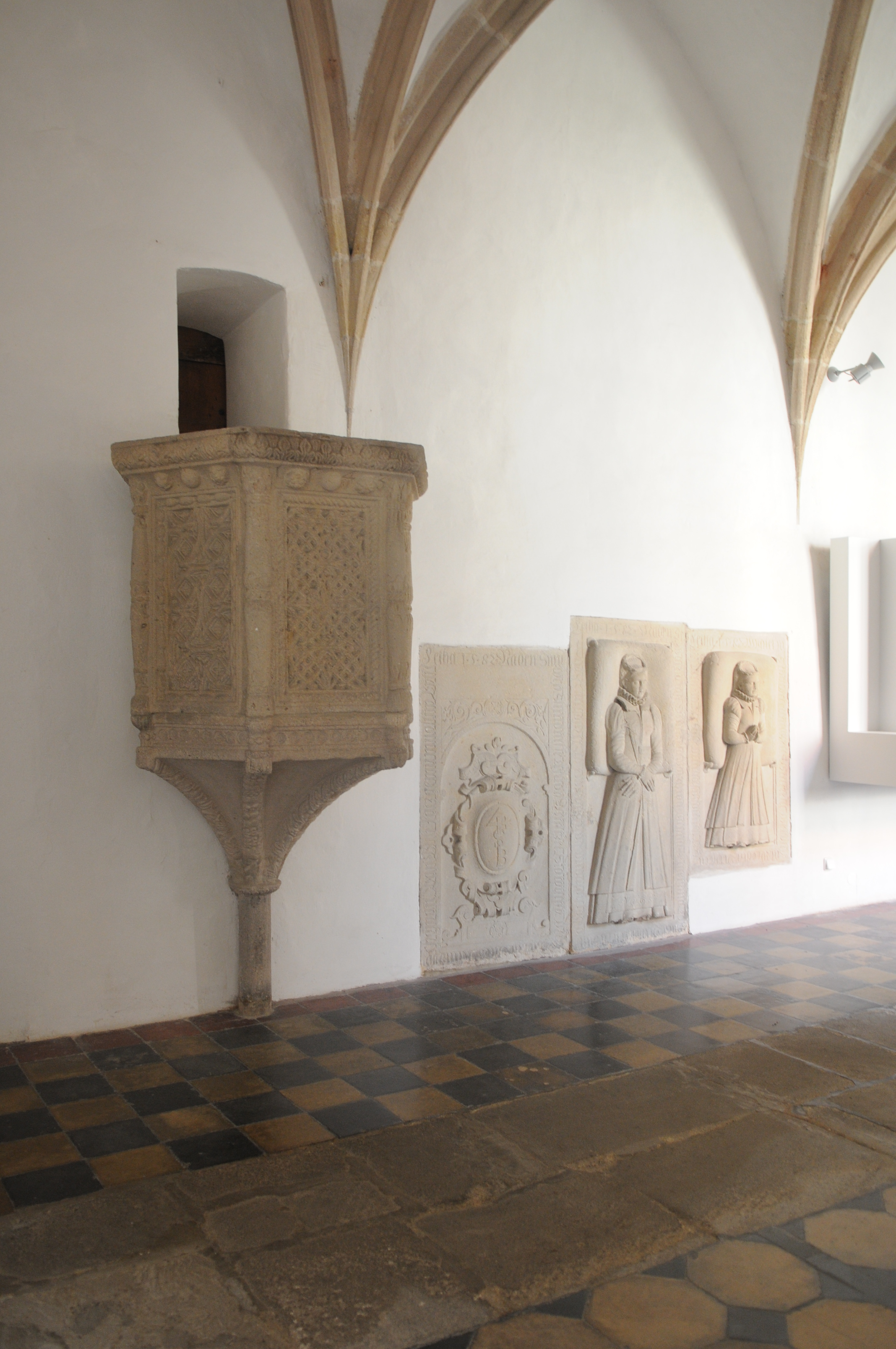
South wing

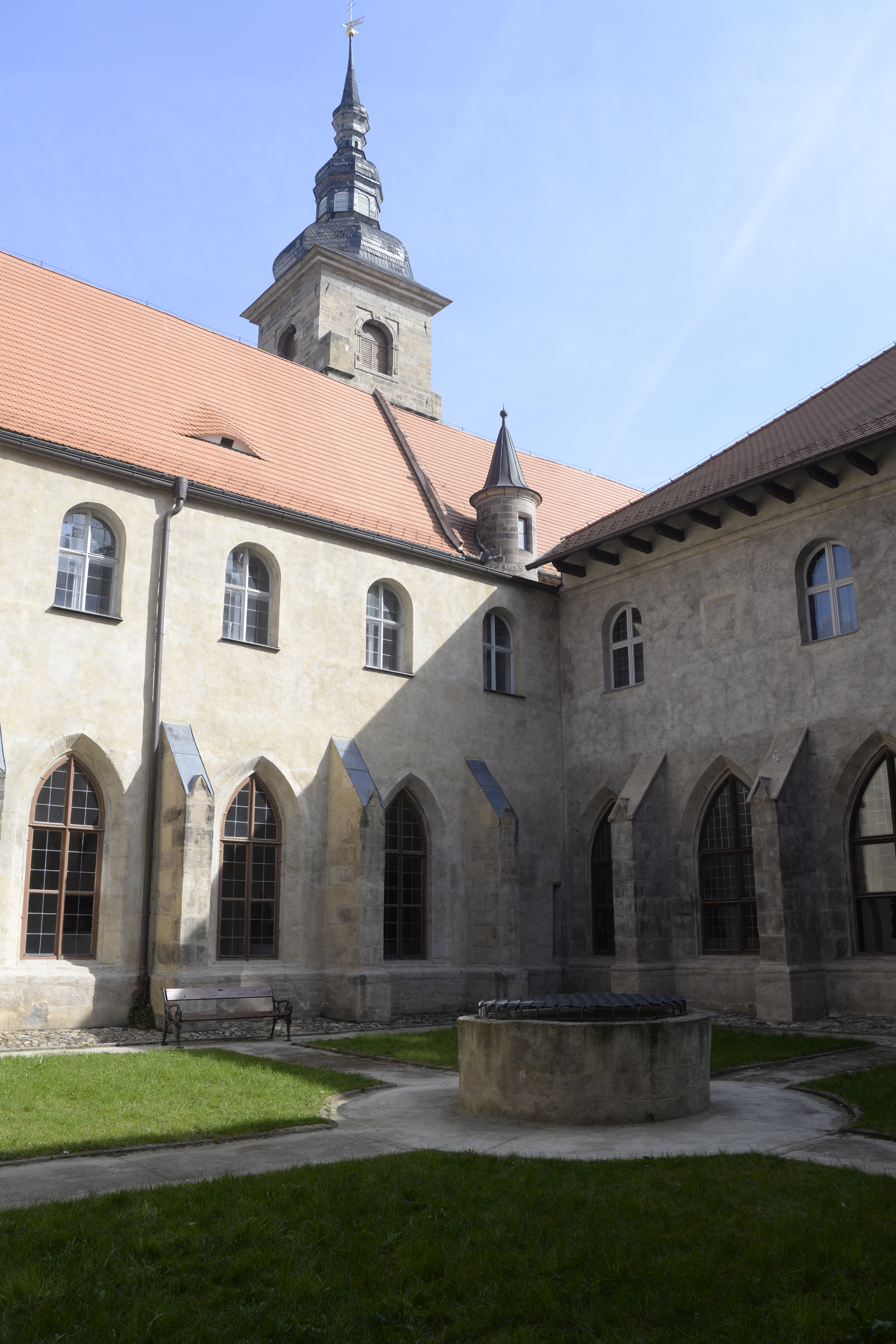
Garden

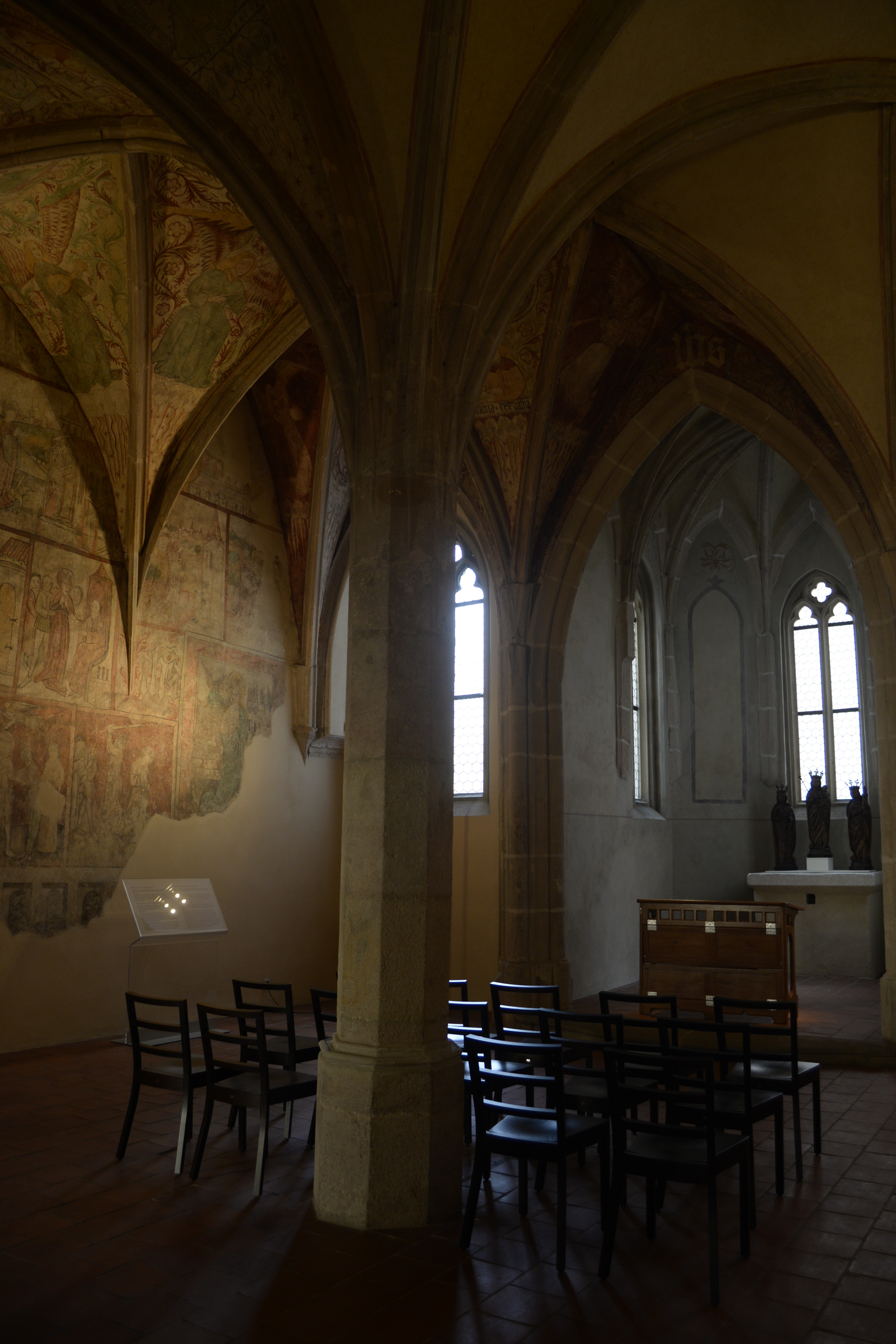
Chapterhouse

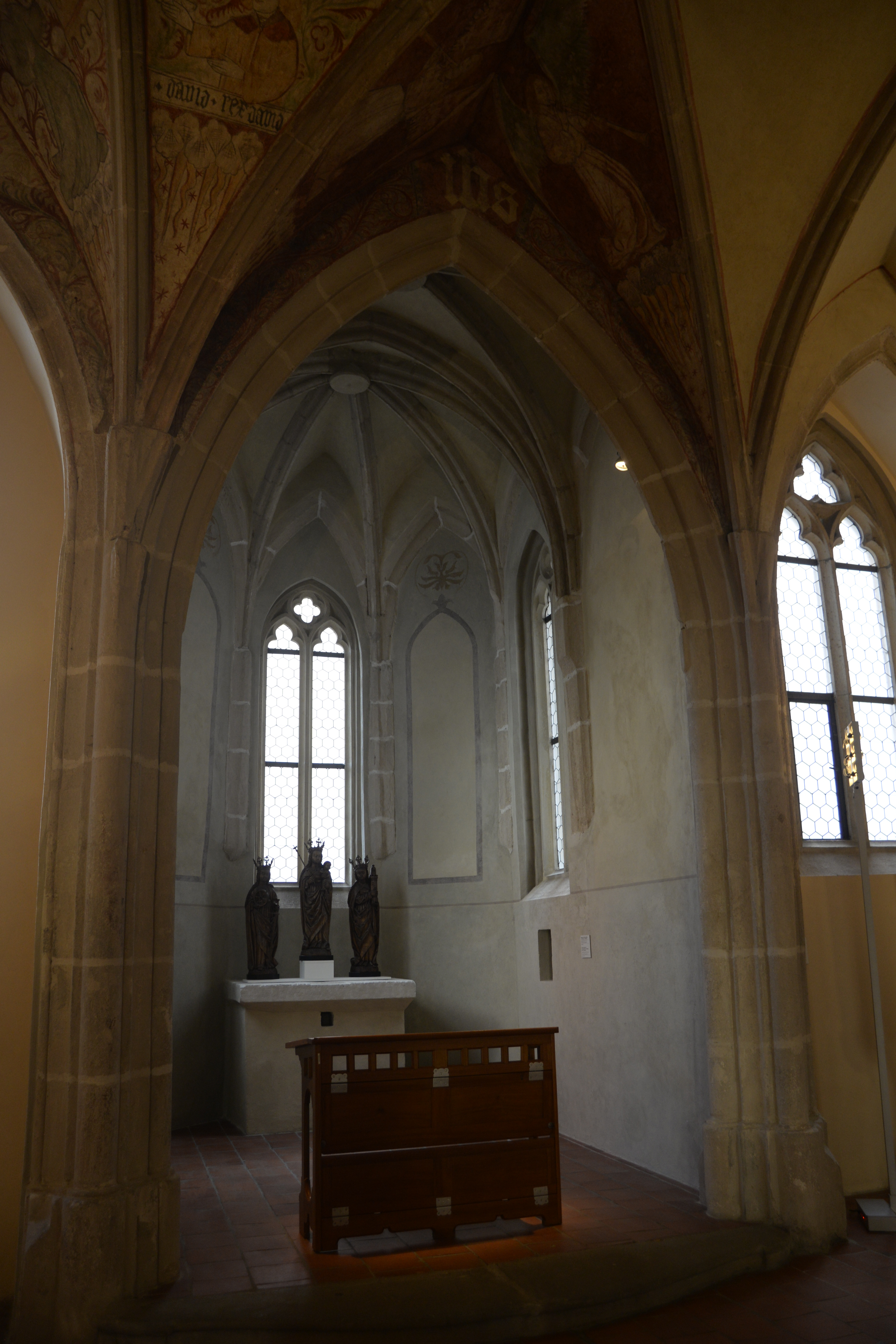
Chapel of St. Barbara

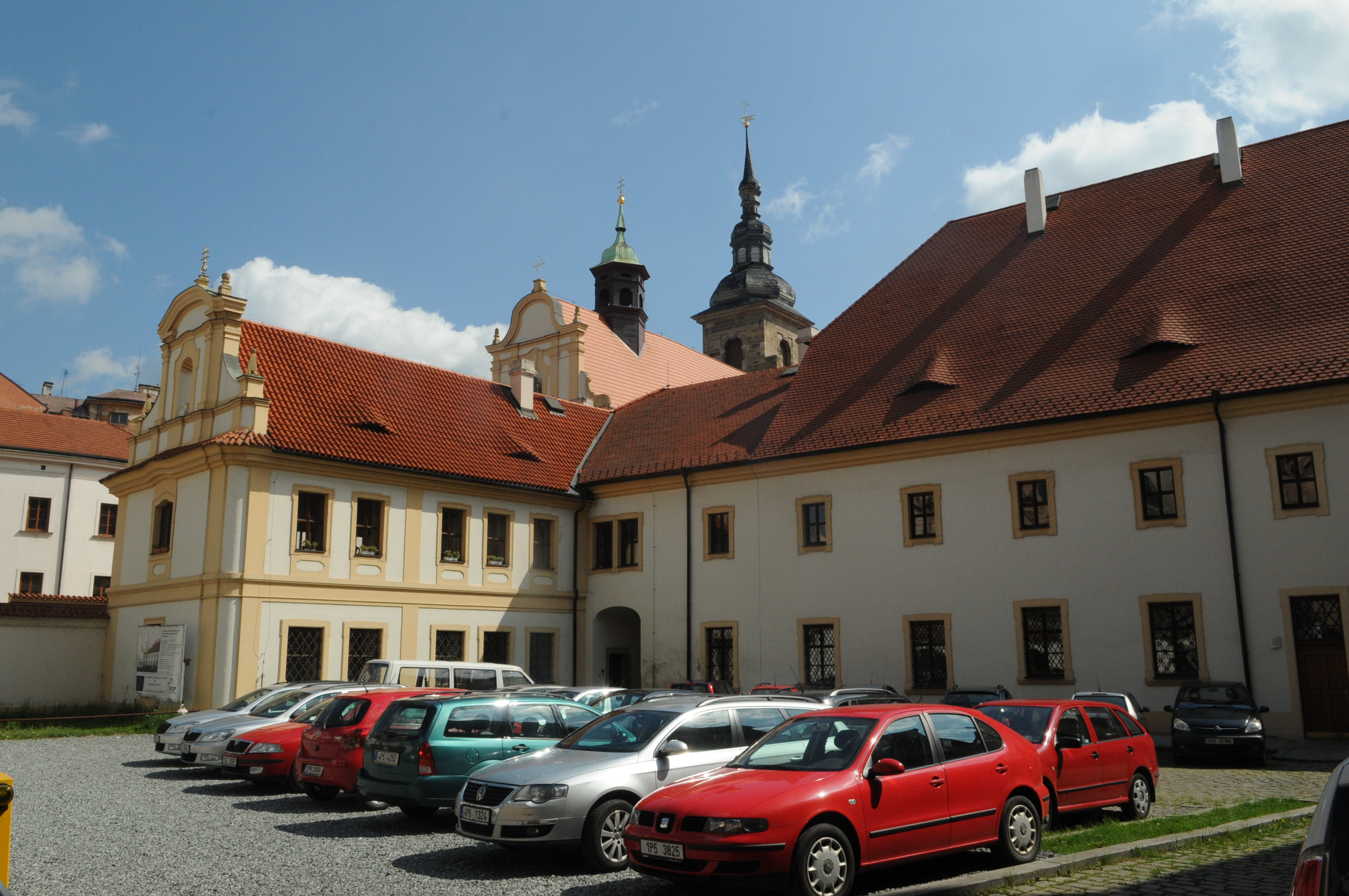
View from east side

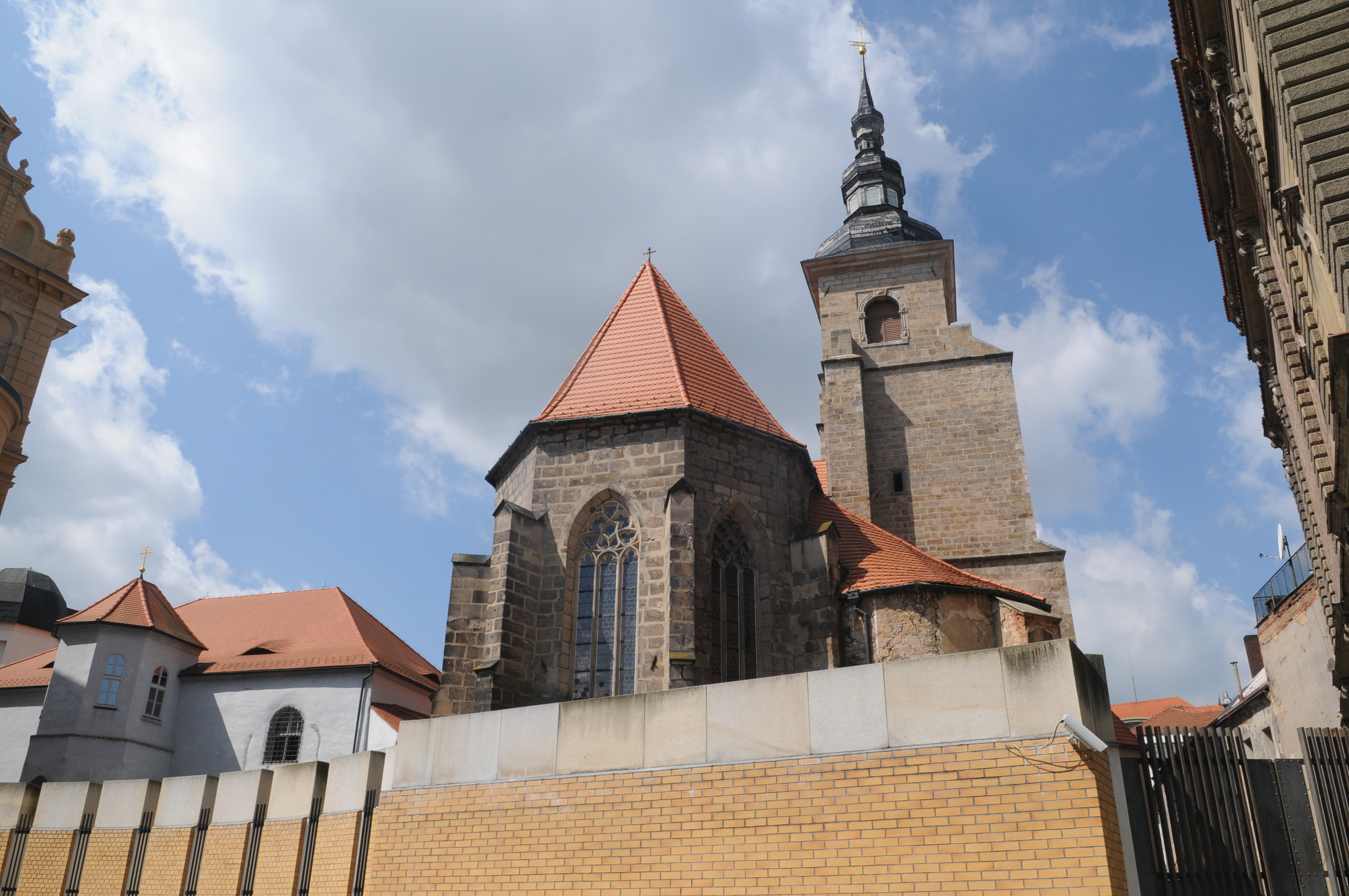
View on the monastery from west side

== Sources ==
- E. Poche a kol., Umělecké památky Čech III. Praha 1980, str. 92–94.
- Kuthan, Jiří. Česká architektura v době posledních Přemyslovců: města, hrady, kláštery, kostely. Vyd. 1. Vimperk: Tina, 1994, 582 s. ISBN 80-85618-14-1.
- Bartušek, Antonín. Umělecké památky Čech. 1. vyd. Editor Zdeněk Wirth. Praha: Nakladatelství Československé akademie věd, 1957, 938 s. Umělecké památky republiky Československé, sv. 3.
