= Nebílovy =

- Municipality
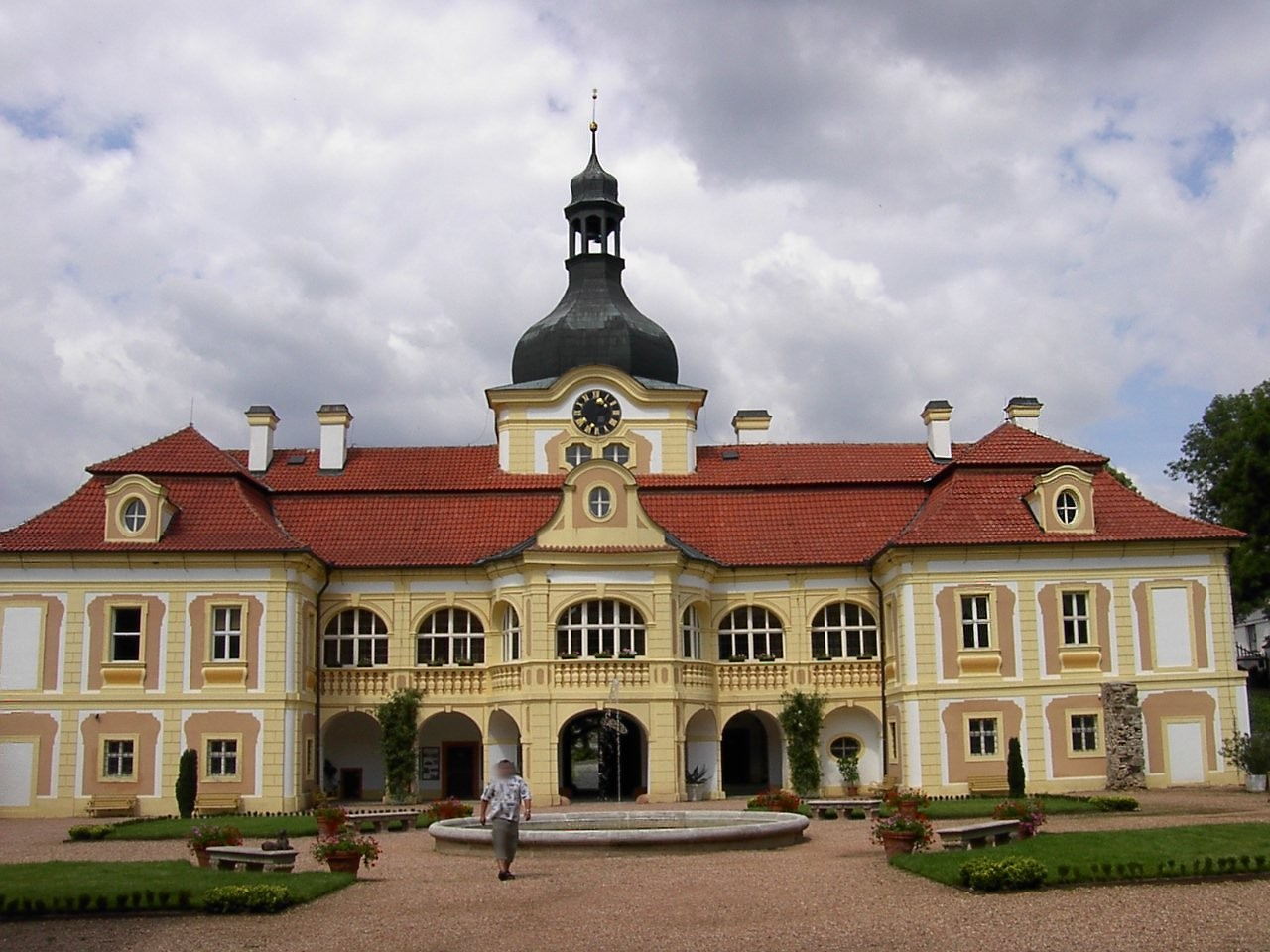
- Nebílovy Castle

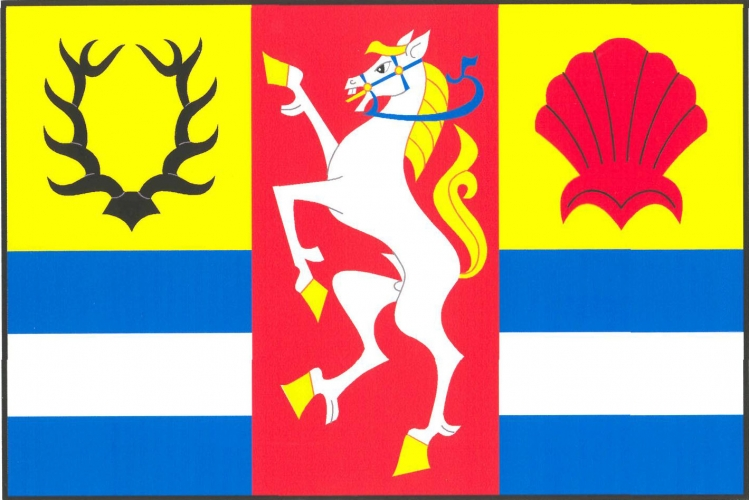
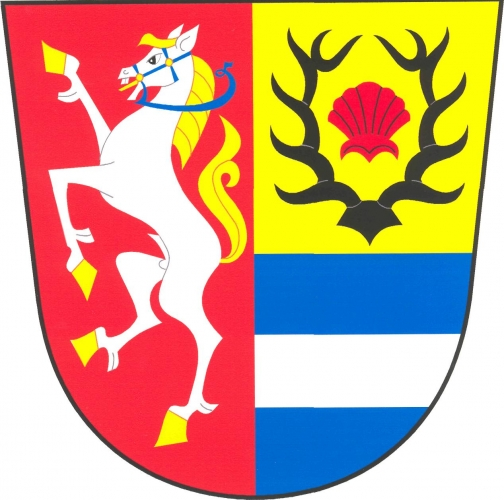
- Flag Coat of arms

- Location in the Czech Republic
- Coordinates: 49°37′49″N 13°25′45″E
- Country: Czech Republic
- Region: Plzeň
- District: Plzeň-South
- First mentioned: 1327

Area
  - Total: 5.26 km^{2} (2.03 sq mi)
- Elevation: 428 m (1,404 ft)

Population (2026-01-01)
  - Total: 390
  - Density: 74/km^{2} (190/sq mi)
- Time zone: UTC+1 (CET)
  - Summer (DST): UTC+2 (CEST)
- Postal code: 332 04
- Website: www.obecnebilovy.cz

Nebílovy (German: Nebillau) is a municipality and village in Plzeň-South District in the Plzeň Region of the Czech Republic. It has about 400 inhabitants.

Nebílovy lies approximately 14 kilometres (9 mi) south of Plzeň and 88 km (55 mi) south-west of Prague.

== Demographics ==
Historical population
Year	Pop.	±%
1869	367	—
1880	368	+0.3%
1890	353	−4.1%
1900	373	+5.7%
1910	405	+8.6%
1921	383	−5.4%
1930	395	+3.1%
1950	347	−12.2%
1961	363	+4.6%
1970	344	−5.2%
1980	323	−6.1%
1991	306	−5.3%
2001	330	+7.8%
2011	327	−0.9%
2021	363	+11.0%
Source: Censuses

== Sights ==
Nebílovy is known for the Baroque Nebílovy Castle designed by Jakub Auguston.
