= Nebílovy Castle =

Castle in the Czech Republic

Coordinates: 49°37′48″N 13°25′46″E

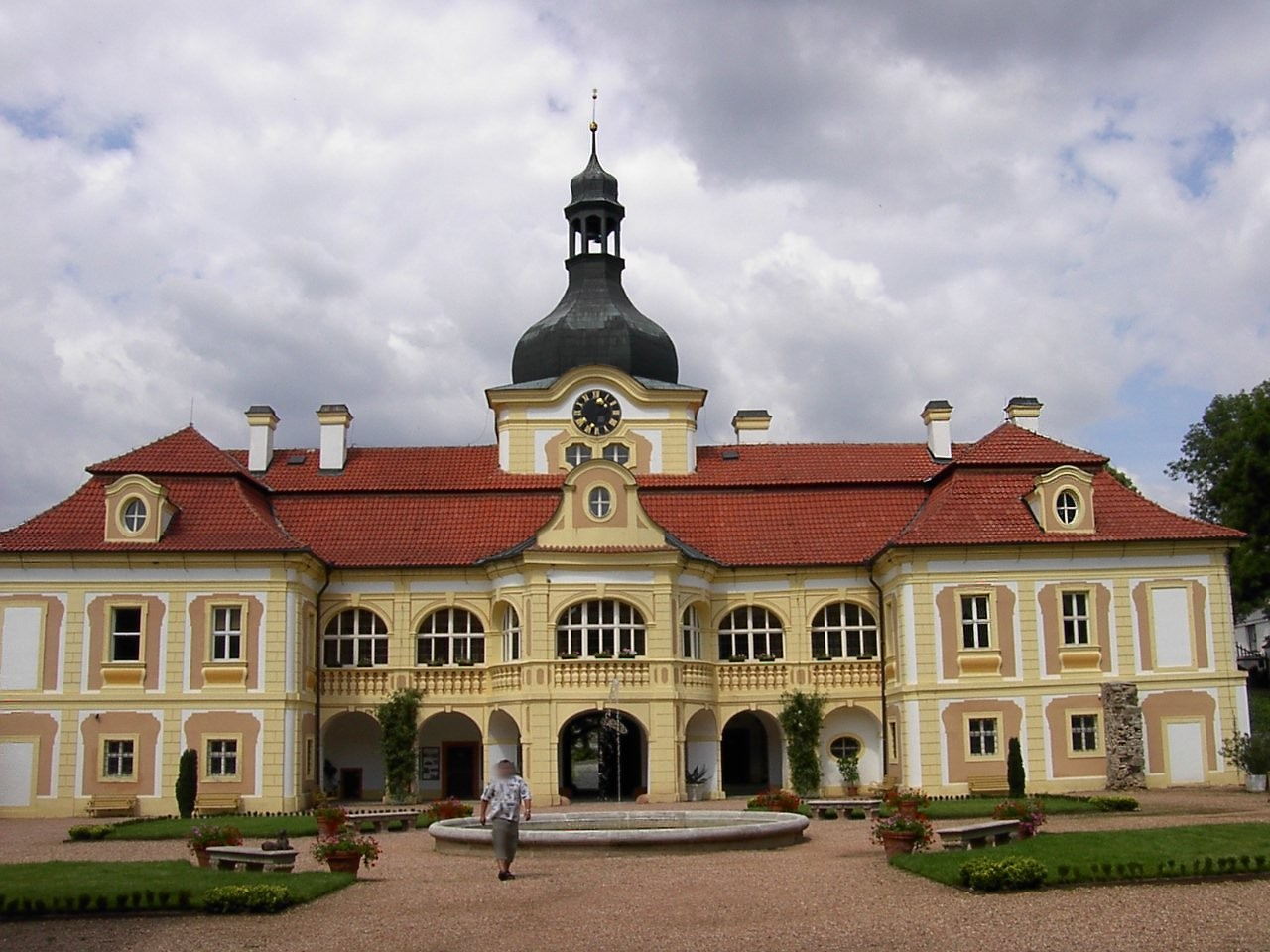
View of the castle

Nebílovy Castle (Czech: zámek Nebílovy) is a castle in Nebílovy in the Plzeň Region of the Czech Republic. It is situated about 16 km south of Plzeň.

== History ==
Older renaissance manor was rebuilt into a baroque by architect and builder Jakub Auguston, probably according to the project of imperial architect J. L. Hildebrandt. Nebílovy Castle consists of two buildings facing each other which used to be connected by arcade corridors and terraces along their sides. The castle was repaired by V. Haberditz and J. L. Palliardi in the 18th century.
