= Trpísty Castle =

Coordinates: 49°49′25.7″N 13°03′31.7″E

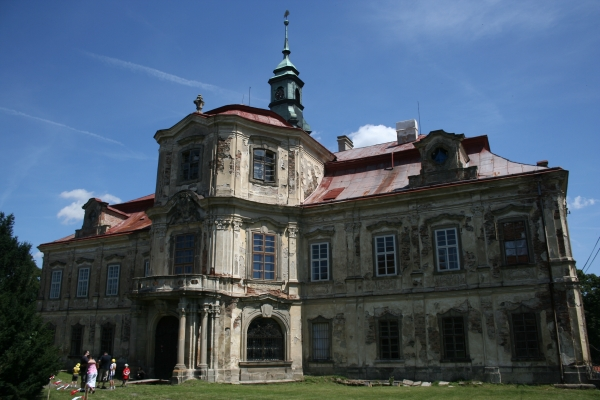
Front view

Trpísty Castle (Czech: zámek Trpísty, German: Schloss Trpist) is a late baroque manor house in Trpísty in the Plzeň Region of the Czech Republic.

== History and description ==
The castle was built in 1729 for Count Prosper Anton Josef of Sinzendorf on the site of a medieval fortress. The architect of the house was most likely Jakub Auguston. The extravagant layout and decoration of the house set it apart from Auguston's other works in provincial style, so Trpísty either is his best and most mature project or it has been designed by somebody else. The layout of the building is based on two pavilions (the North and South Wing) connected by two large oval rooms protruding in the middle of the East and West facades. The piano nobile on the first floor is lavishly decorated with allegorical baroque frescoes in stucco mirrors, while the main drawing room boasts a large fresco on its entire vaulted ceiling depicting an apotheosis of the Sinzendorf family and historic scenes from the Ottoman Court.

The large formal garden was landscaped in the English style in the 19th century and contains today a rich collection of rare trees, among them a 19th-century female Ginkgo tree.

The castle, its park and outbuildings are among the last remaining examples of 18th century Bohemian country houses embedded in its original landscape without visible changes in the wake of industrialisation or subsequent destruction during the communist rule and belong to the most valuable historic estates in Central Europe.

Today the castle is privately owned and gradually reconstructed.
