= Trpísty =

- Municipality
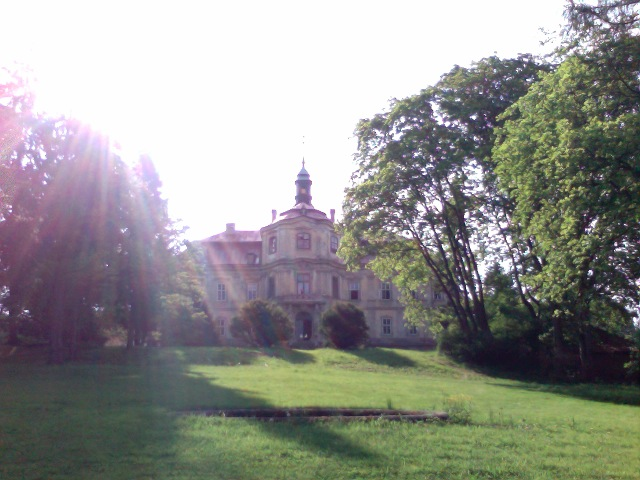
- Trpísty Castle

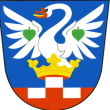
- Flag Coat of arms

- Location in the Czech Republic
- Coordinates: 49°49′22″N 13°3′31″E
- Country: Czech Republic
- Region: Plzeň
- District: Tachov
- First mentioned: 1251

Area
  - Total: 9.68 km^{2} (3.74 sq mi)
- Elevation: 448 m (1,470 ft)

Population (2026-01-01)
  - Total: 268
  - Density: 27.7/km^{2} (71.7/sq mi)
- Time zone: UTC+1 (CET)
  - Summer (DST): UTC+2 (CEST)
- Postal code: 349 01
- Website: www.trpisty.cz

Trpísty (German: Trpist) is a municipality and village in Tachov District in the Plzeň Region of the Czech Republic. It has about 300 inhabitants.

Trpísty lies approximately 33 kilometres (21 mi) east of Tachov, 24 km (15 mi) west of Plzeň, and 102 km (63 mi) west of Prague.

== Administrative division ==
Trpísty consists of two municipal parts (in brackets population according to the 2021 census):

- Trpísty (194)
- Sviňomazy (38)

== Demographics ==
Historical population
| Year | Pop. | ±% |
|---|---|---|
| 1869 | 518 | — |
| 1880 | 500 | −3.5% |
| 1890 | 516 | +3.2% |
| 1900 | 533 | +3.3% |
| 1910 | 597 | +12.0% |
| 1921 | 589 | −1.3% |
| 1930 | 541 | −8.1% |
| 1950 | 352 | −34.9% |
| 1961 | 430 | +22.2% |
| 1970 | 361 | −16.0% |
| 1980 | 349 | −3.3% |
| 1991 | 234 | −33.0% |
| 2001 | 218 | −6.8% |
| 2011 | 224 | +2.8% |
| 2021 | 232 | +3.6% |
Source: Censuses

== Sights ==
The main landmark of Trpísty is the Trpísty Castle, a late Baroque manor house built in 1729.
