= Sidi-Amara =

(Henchir) Sidi Amara may refer to the following (ruins of) towns in Roman North Africa, both in modern Tunisia, former bishoprics and presently Latin Catholic titular see :

- Aggar (city)
- Avioccala
