= Hodice =

- Municipality
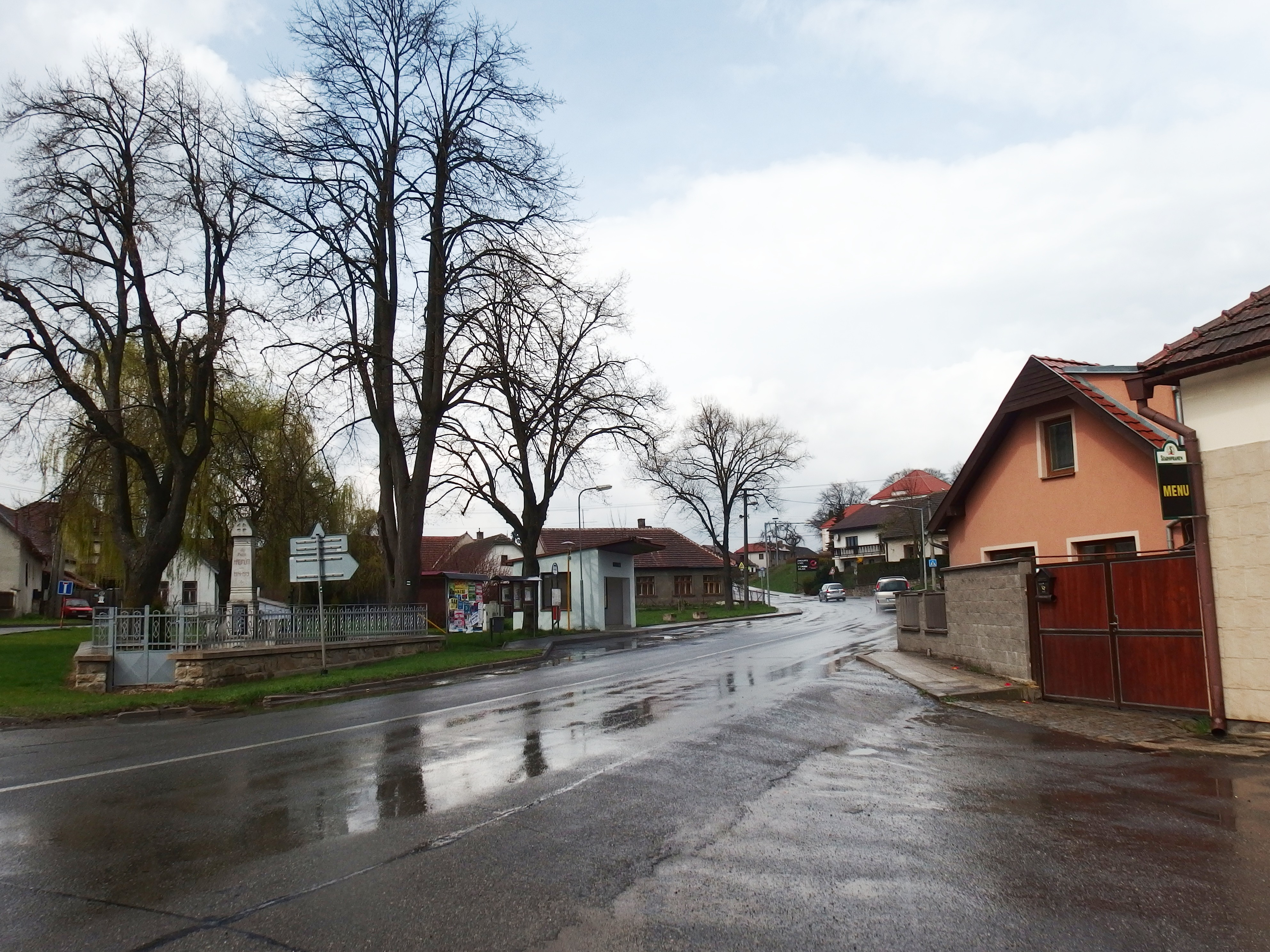
- Centre of Hodice

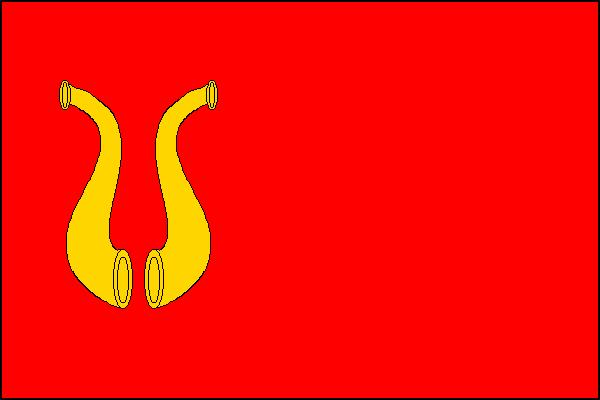
- Flag Coat of arms

- Location in the Czech Republic
- Coordinates: 49°16′12″N 15°28′48″E
- Country: Czech Republic
- Region: Vysočina
- District: Jihlava
- First mentioned: 1303

Area
  - Total: 12.54 km^{2} (4.84 sq mi)
- Elevation: 563 m (1,847 ft)

Population (2026-01-01)
  - Total: 701
  - Density: 55.9/km^{2} (145/sq mi)
- Time zone: UTC+1 (CET)
  - Summer (DST): UTC+2 (CEST)
- Postal code: 589 01
- Website: www.hodice.cz

Hodice (Czech pronunciation: [ˈɦoɟɪtsɛ]; German: Höditz) is a municipality and village in Jihlava District in the Vysočina Region of the Czech Republic. It has about 700 inhabitants.

== Geography ==
Hodice is located about 16 kilometres (10 mi) southwest of Jihlava. It lies in the Křižanov Highlands. The highest point is the hill Jelení hora at 653 m (2,142 ft) above sea level. The stream Třešťský potok flows through the municipality. The municipal territory is rich in fishponds.

== History ==
The first written mention of Hodice is from 1303. The village was owned by a local noble family, which called themselves as Barons of Hodice. They owned Hodice until 1538, when the village was annexed to the Třešť estate. As a result of the loss of independent administration, Hodice experienced economic decline.

== Demographics ==
Historical population

Year	Pop.	±%
1869	541	—
1880	606	+12.0%
1890	680	+12.2%
1900	733	+7.8%
1910	785	+7.1%

Year	Pop.	±%
1921	874	+11.3%
1930	912	+4.3%
1950	740	−18.9%
1961	721	−2.6%
1970	715	−0.8%

Year	Pop.	±%
1980	764	+6.9%
1991	762	−0.3%
2001	773	+1.4%
2011	728	−5.8%
2021	682	−6.3%

Source: Censuses

== Transport ==
Hodice is located on the railway line Havlíčkův Brod–Slavonice.

== Sights ==
The most valuable monument of Hodice is a Baroque watermill from the end of the 18th century.
