= Aggar (city) =

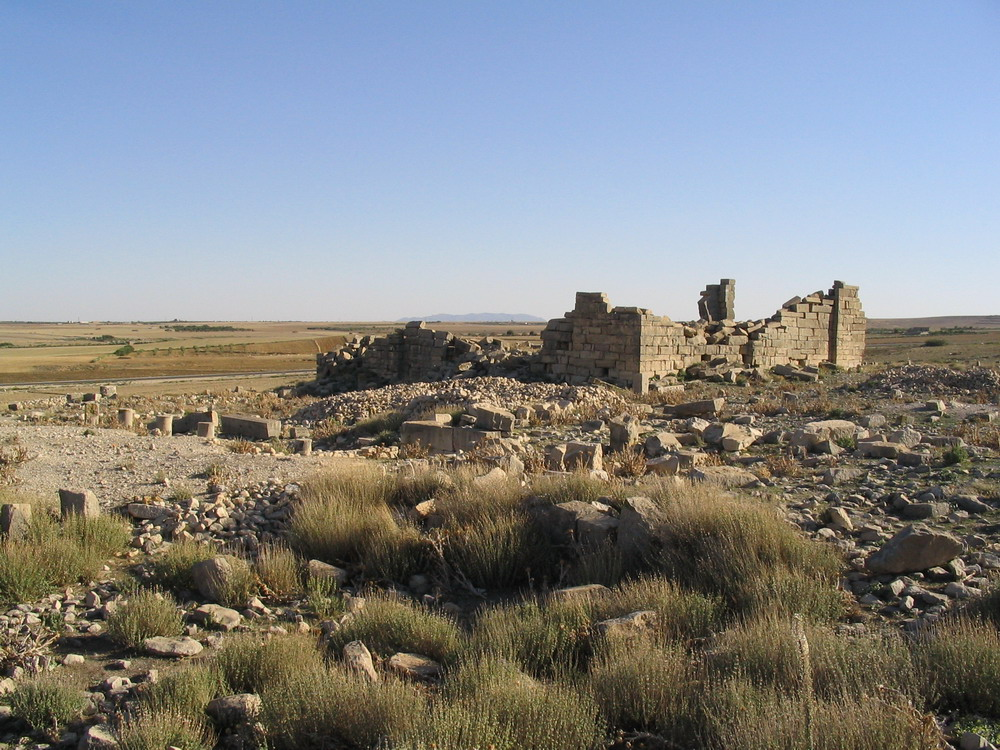
- Ruins of Aggar

- Location within Tunisia
- 35°41′18.0″N 9°10′0″E
- Location: Tunisia
- Region: Siliana Governorate

Aggar was a town and bishopric (now titular) in the Roman province of Byzacena. One of two cities in the area, it left vast ruins that are now called (Henchir) Sidi Amara. These edifices are situated in the plain of Siliana, around 60 kilometres east of Maktar.

A distinct Sidi Amara further north in Tunisia holds the ruins of the Ancient town of Avioccala, located in the Roman province of Africa Proconsularis.

== Ruins ==
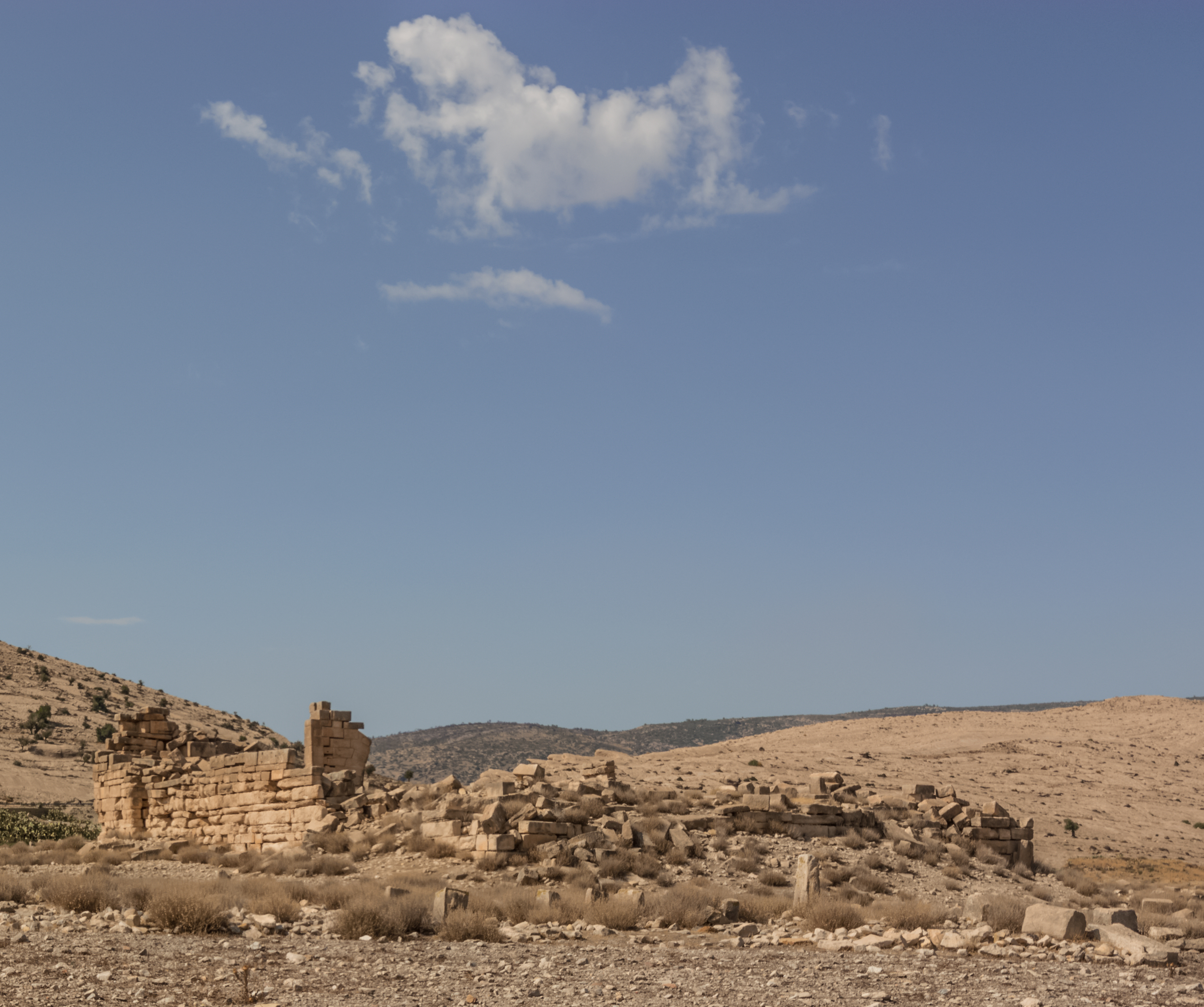
Byzantine Citadel.

The ruins of Aggar, whose identity is confirmed by inscriptions found there, include those of a triumphal arch opening onto a large porticoed area, with a temple behind it, which must have been the forum and the capitol. A Byzantine fortress, 30 m square with square, slightly projecting corner towers was built on an arcaded structure identified as a temple of Juno. Another temple of unidentified dedication adjoins this citadel. Outside the city proper stands a two-storey mausoleum of a certain C. Marius Romanus with roofing almost intact. A ruined theatre can also be seen. About 1500 metres west of the town, the wadi Jilf was crossed by a bridge originally of ten arches, of which six remain.

== History ==
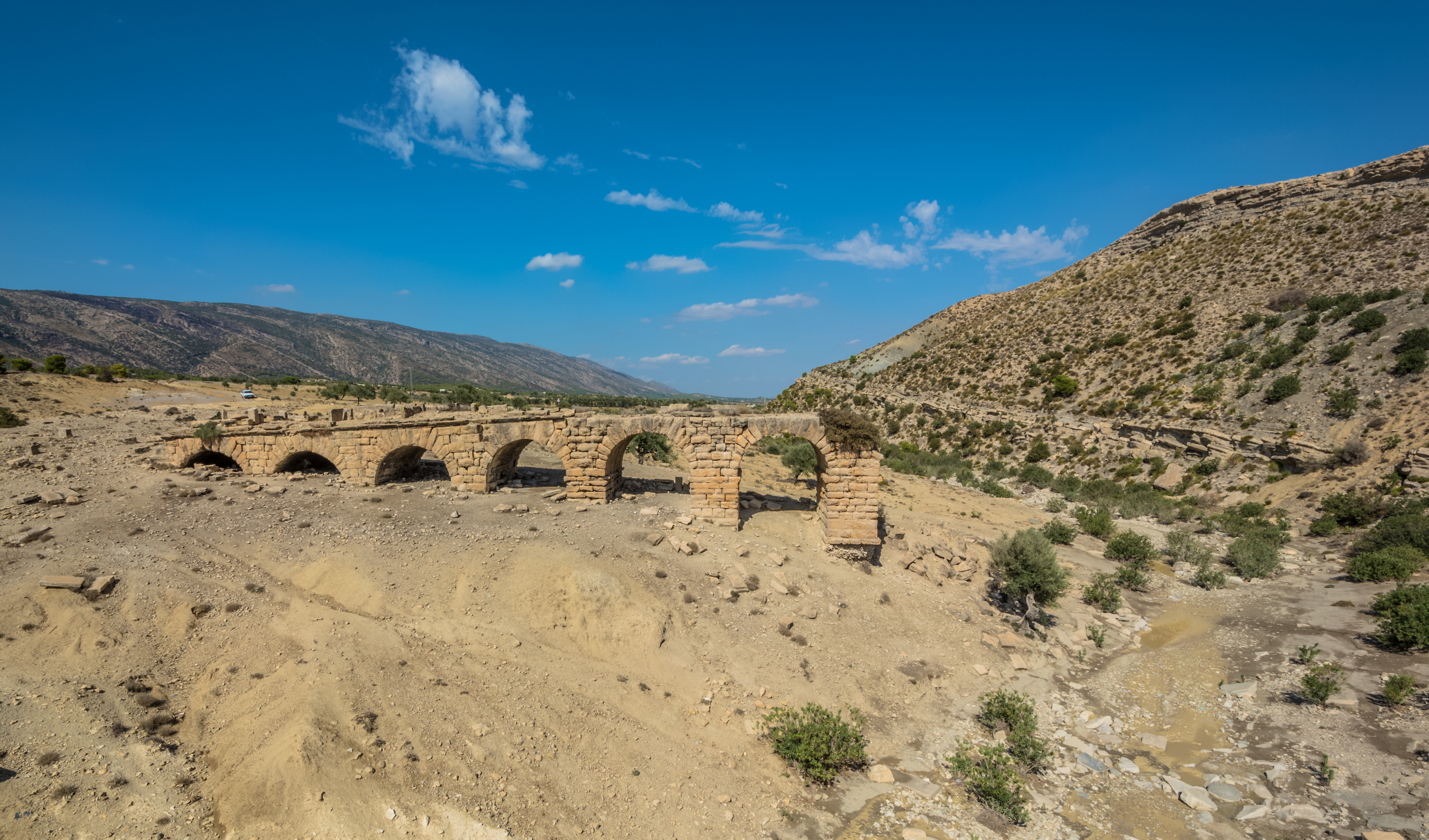
Roman Bridge from Aggar.

Aggar appears in the Tabula Peutingeriana

In AD 232, Aggar was granted the rank of municipium (CIL VIII 1, 714), and later became a colonia.

== Ecclesiastical history ==
Aggar was among the many cities of sufficient importance in Roman North Africa to become a suffragan diocese of the Metropolitan of Carthage, in the papal sway, but faded, plausibly at the seventh century advent of Islam.

The only historically documented bishop of Aggar is Donatus, one of the Catholic bishops whom the Arian Vandal king Huneric summoned to a Council of Carthage in 484 and then exiled, unlike their schismatical Donatist counterparts (none reported from Aggar).

=== Titular see ===
The diocese was nominally restored by the Catholic Church in 1933 as a Latin titular bishopric of Aggar (Latin = Curiate Italian) / Aggaritan(us) (Latin adjective).

It has had the following incumbents, so far of the fitting Episcopal (lowest) rank:

- Joseph Ludwig Buchkremer (28 October 1961 – 24 August 1986 (death)), first as Auxiliary Bishop of Diocese of Aachen (Germany) (28 October 1961 – 4 October 1979), then as emeritate
- Alfred Kostelecky (12 November 1986 – 10 February 1990) as Auxiliary Bishop of Wien (Austria) (12 November 1986 – 10 February 1990); later Military Ordinary of Austria (Austria) (12 November 1986 – 22 February 1994), emeritate as Titular Bishop of Wiener Neustadt (10 February 1990 – 22 February 1994 (death))
- František Radkovský (17 March 1990 – 31 May 1993) as Secretary General of Czech Bishops' Conference (1990 – 7 July 1993) and Auxiliary Bishop of Archdiocese of Prague (Czech Republic) (17 March 1990 – 31 May 1993); later Bishop of Plzeň (Czech Republic) (31 May 1993 – 12 February 2016 (retired))
- Antoni Józef Długosz (18 December 1993 – ...), first as Auxiliary Bishop of Archdiocese of Częstochowa (Poland) (18 December 1993 – 7 May 2016 (retired)), then as emeritate.

== See also ==
- List of Catholic dioceses in Tunisia

== Sources and external links ==
- GCatholic - (former &) titular bishopric

Bibliography – ecclesiastical

- Pius Bonifacius Gams, Series episcoporum Ecclesiae Catholicae, Leipzig 1931, p. 464
- Stefano Antonio Morcelli, Africa christiana, Volume I, Brescia 1816, pp. 71–72
