= Josef Jiří Švec =

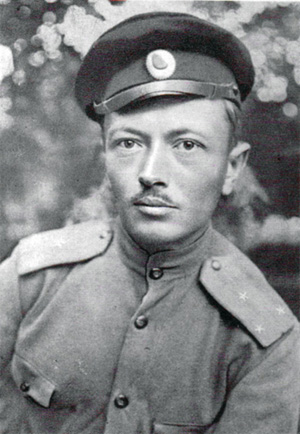
- Born: 19 July 1883; Čenkov, Austria-Hungary
- Died: 25 October 1918 (aged 35) Aksakovo, Soviet Union
- Allegiance: Russian Empire; Czechoslovakia
- Branch: Russian Army; White Army; Czechoslovak Legion
- Service years: 1914–1918
- Rank: Colonel (from 1918)
- Conflicts: World War I; Russian Civil War

Josef Jiří Švec (19 July 1883 – 25 October 1918) was a Czech military officer, member of Česká družina and later of the Czechoslovak Legion in Russia; he had formerly been a teacher. He committed suicide after the men under his command refused to obey his orders. He is one of the most commemorated members of the Czechoslovak legions.

== Early life and education ==
Švec was born in Čenkov (today part of Třešť), Moravia, Austria-Hungary. He attended the municipal school in Třešť and then grammar school in Pelhřimov, before studying at the teacher-training institute in Soběslav. He gained additional qualification as a physical education teacher.

== Career ==
=== Teacher ===
After eight years teaching at the municipal primary school in Třebíč he, as a member of the Sokol sport organization, accepted an offer to teach in the Russian Empire. Švec started as a physical education teacher at the economic lyceum in Yekaterinodar in the North Caucasus, but due to his poor health (recurring colds), he was forced to go to the Black Sea coast to the city of Gelendzhik.

=== First World War ===
Here Švec received the news of the Sarajevo Assassination and the beginning of the First World War. As a Pan-Slavist and Russophile he decided not to return home to avoid being recruited to the Austro-Hungarian Army to fight against Russia. Instead, he volunteered for the Česká družina military troop formed in Kyiv by Czech expatriates in Russia; the troop was later transformed into the Czechoslovak Legion in Russia. He started as the commander of the first platoon, where he conducted intelligence work. While on military campaign near the town of Berezhnica, he converted to the Eastern Orthodox Church and gave himself the middle name Georgij (not George or Yuri). Orthodoxy accepted more legionnaires, mainly for political reasons.

=== Military commander ===
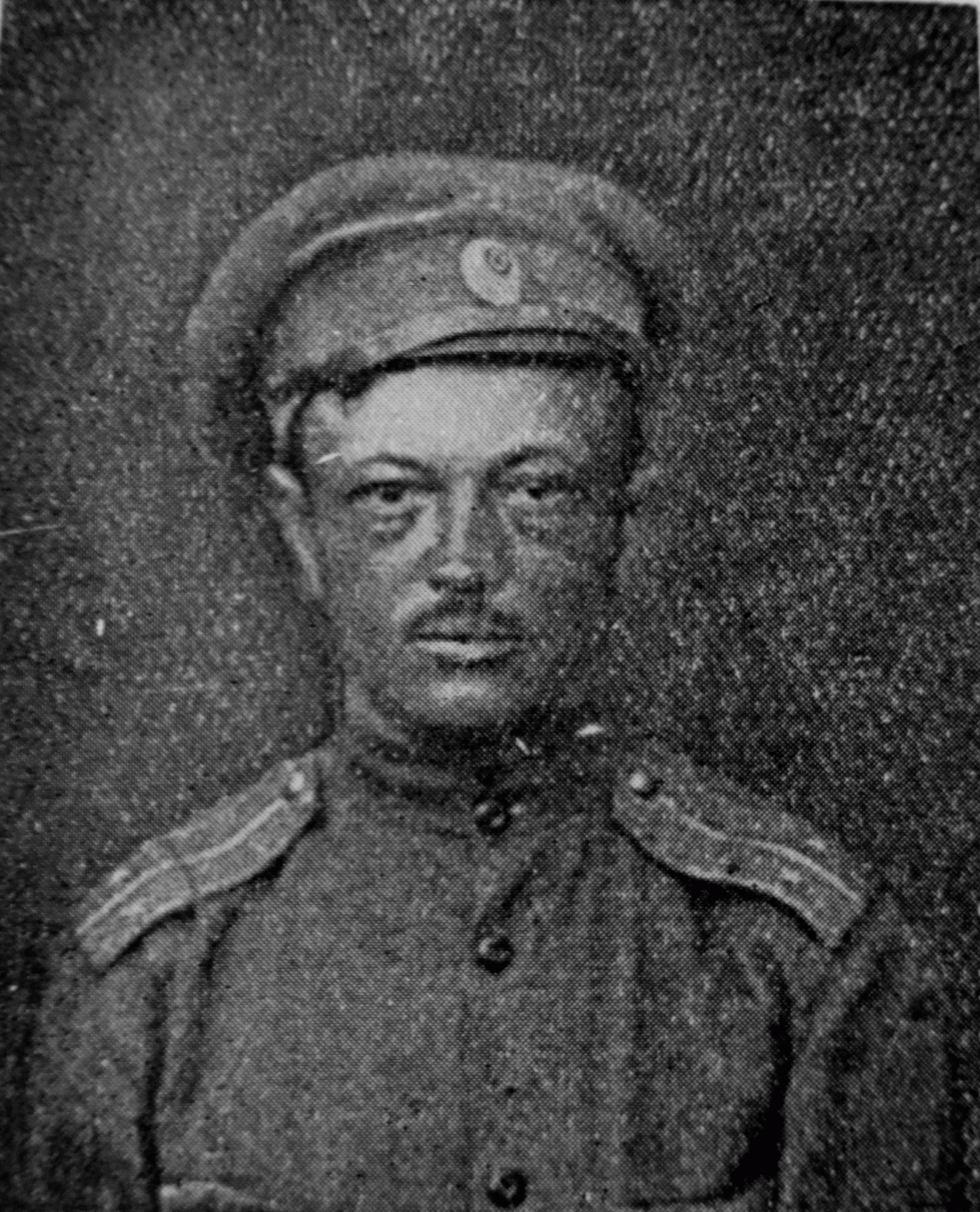
Portrait of J. J. Švec in the uniform of the Czechoslovak Legion

He gained the greatest fame as the commander of the eighth company of the 1st Rifle Regiment. He and his company successfully fought in the Battle of Zboriv. After this victory in battle, Švec was promoted to lieutenant for his heroism and appointed commander of the 3rd Battalion of the 1st Regiment Mistra Jana Husa. After the Russian Civil War started, legionaries were forced to escape from the country by taking the Trans-Siberian Railway, embarking on the ships in Vladivostok and sailing around Asia to Europe. Švec was commander of his battalion when they participated in the Battle of Kazan, the Battle of Penza, the Battle of Lipyagi, and the capture of Samara by the Legion. These battles were fought against the Bolshevik Red Army, who were preventing the departure of the Czechoslovak Legion from Russia. In August 1918, Švec was promoted to colonel, and in mid-October he became the commander of the entire 1st division.

== Death and legacy ==
His troops, based at the Aksakovo-Belebej station and onboarded in trains, were ordered by Švec on 24 October 1918 to attack and dislodge the superior force of the Bolsheviks from the Buzuluk-Bugulma line. His subordinates, mainly under the influence of the troop member and communist agitator Jan Vodička, disobeyed him and refused to comply with the order. Švec then returned to the staff wagon, wrote a farewell letter and at three o'clock in the morning on 25 October 1918, shot himself with his handgun. The death of their colonel shook the Czechoslovak soldiers, and they finally executed the order. Švec was buried in Chelyabinsk on 28 October 1918, the very same date when independent Czechoslovakia was established.

His story became well known, first among the legionary troops, and then in the newborn Czechoslovakia after their return there, and, especially, after Rudolf Medek's play Plukovník Švec (Colonel Švec), was staged, premiering at the National Theatre in Prague. In 1933, during the liquidation of the Chelyabinsk military cemetery for residential development, Czechoslovak diplomats were able to persuade the Soviet government to allow the exhumation and transfer of the remains of Colonel Švec to Czechoslovakia. The remains were, along with the remains of Lt. Col. K. Vašátko, placed in the Liberation Memorial at Vítkov Hill in Prague. Twenty thousand people attended the funeral. During the Nazi occupation of the country, by order of the Gestapo, the remains were definitively placed in the family tomb in Třešť cemetery.

Švec is also commemorated by multiple statues and memorial plaques; some of these were destroyed during the Nazi occupation. His diaries were first published in 1920.

== Gallery ==
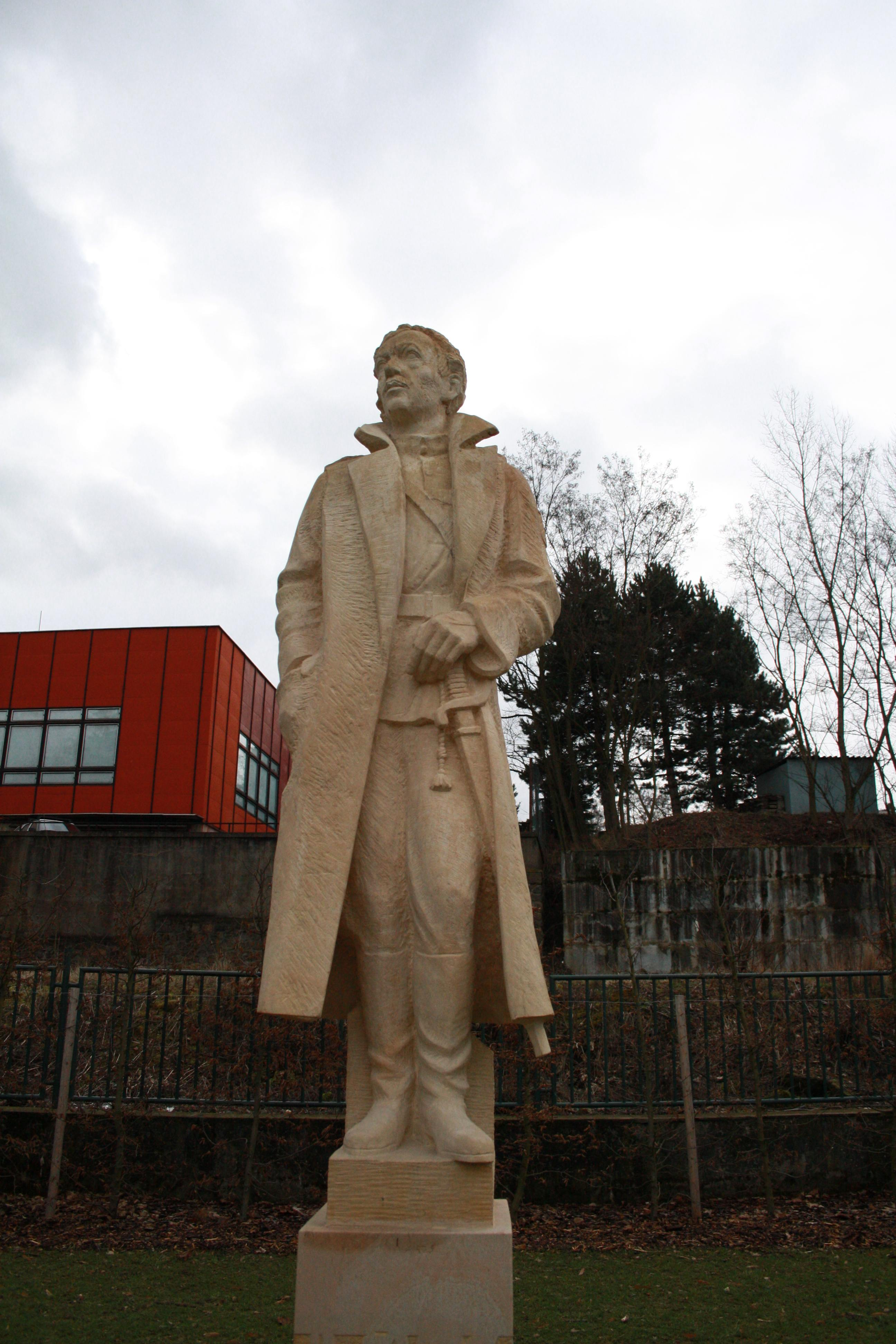
Jaroslav Šlezinger: Statue of Josef Jiří Švec in Třebíč

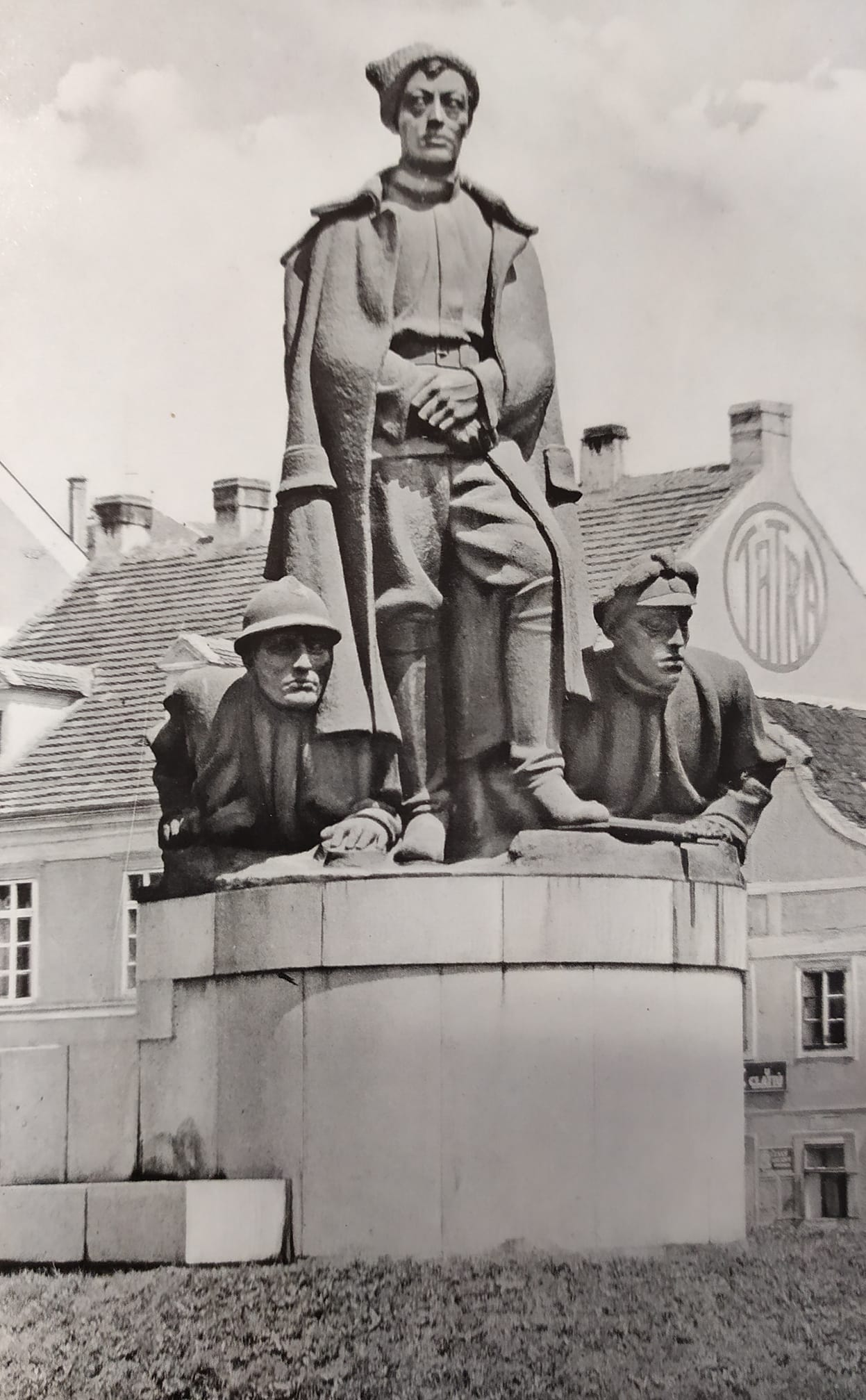
Otto Birma: Statue of Josef Jiří Švec in České Budějovice (erected in 1928, removed in 1939)

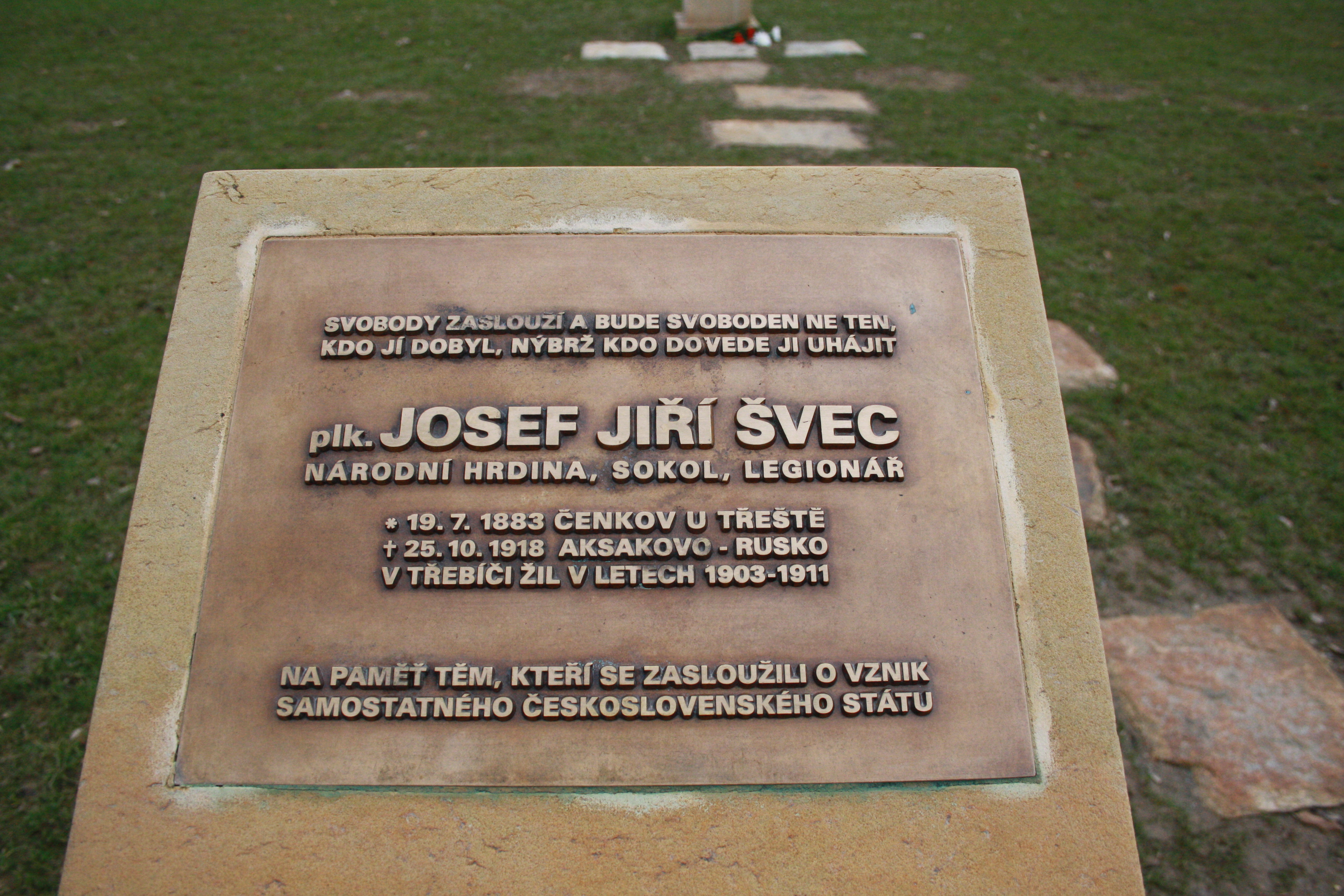
Memorial plaque in Třebíč

== Literature ==
- GÖBL, L. Osobnosti Vysočiny I.. 1st ed. Pelhřimov: Vydavatelství 999, 2005. 245 p. ISBN 80-86391-15-9 (in Czech)
- BUDÍNSKÝ, L. Vraždy, sebevraždy, popravy slavných Čechů / Vydavatelství MAYDAY publishing, 2008. 62-63 s. ISBN 978-80-86986-31-9 (in Czech)
- PRECLÍK, Vratislav. T.G. Masaryk a jeho legionáři, in ČAS, časopis Masarykova demokratického hnutí, No. 97, p. 4-8, ročník XX., January–March 2012, ISSN 1210-1648. (in Czech)
