= František Radkovský =

Czech Roman Catholic bishop (born 1939)

The Most Reverend František Radkovský
- Bishop Emeritus of Plzeň
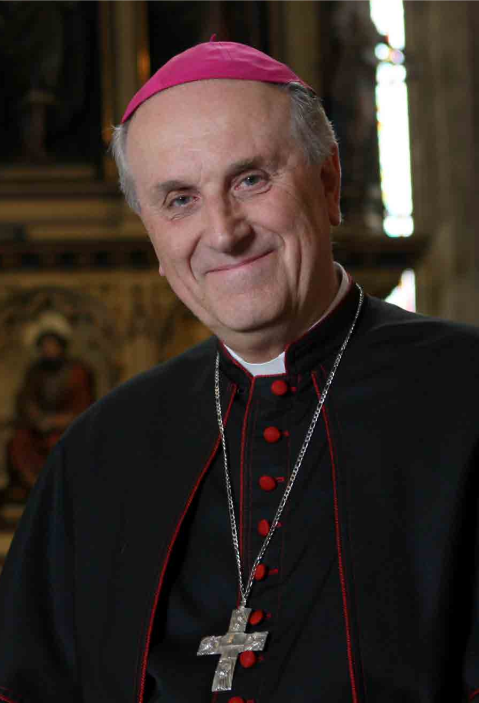
- Radkovský in 2017
- Church: Roman Catholic
- Province: Prague
- Diocese: Plzeň
- Appointed: 31 May 1993
- Term ended: 12 February 2016
- Predecessor: (Position established)
- Successor: Tomáš Holub
- Previous posts: auxiliary bishop of Prague and titular bishop of Aggar (1990–1993)

Orders
- Ordination: 27 June 1970 by František Tomášek
- Consecration: 7 April 1990 by František Tomášek

Personal details
- Born: 3 October 1939 (age 87) Třešť, Protectorate of Bohemia and Moravia
- Education: Charles University
- Motto: Credidimus Caritati
- Coat of arms

František Radkovský (born 3 October 1939) is a Czech Roman Catholic prelate, who served as the first Bishop of Plzeň from 1993 to 2016. He previously served as an auxiliary bishop of the Archdiocese of Prague and titular bishop of Aggar from 1990 to 1993.

== Early life and education ==
Radkovský was born in Třešť. After completing his secondary education, he studied at the Faculty of Mathematics and Physics of Charles University in Prague, specializing in mathematical statistics, graduating in 1962. Following his military service, he entered the Cyril and Methodius Faculty of Theology in Litoměřice in 1966.

== Priesthood ==
He was ordained a priest on 27 June 1970 for the Archdiocese of Prague. His early ministry was spent as a chaplain and administrator in various parishes, including Mariánské Lázně. In 1987, he was appointed the director of the episcopal curia in Prague.

== Episcopal ministry ==
On 17 March 1990, Pope John Paul II appointed him Auxiliary Bishop of Prague and Titular Bishop of Aggar. He received his episcopal consecration on 7 April 1990 from Cardinal František Tomášek.

=== Bishop of Plzeň ===
When the Diocese of Plzeň was established on 31 May 1993, Radkovský was appointed its first diocesan bishop. During his tenure, he focused on building the structures of the new diocese and fostering ecumenical relations. He has frequently spoken on the intersection of faith and social stability, famously noting that a lack of faith can lead to broader societal decline.

On 12 February 2016, Pope Francis accepted his resignation, submitted upon reaching the age limit of 75, and appointed Tomáš Holub as his successor.

== Honours ==
In recognition of his contributions to the city, Radkovský was awarded honorary citizenship of Plzeň.
