= Náměstí Republiky, Plzeň =

Coordinates: 49°44′50″N 13°22′39″E

Northern part of the square around 1918

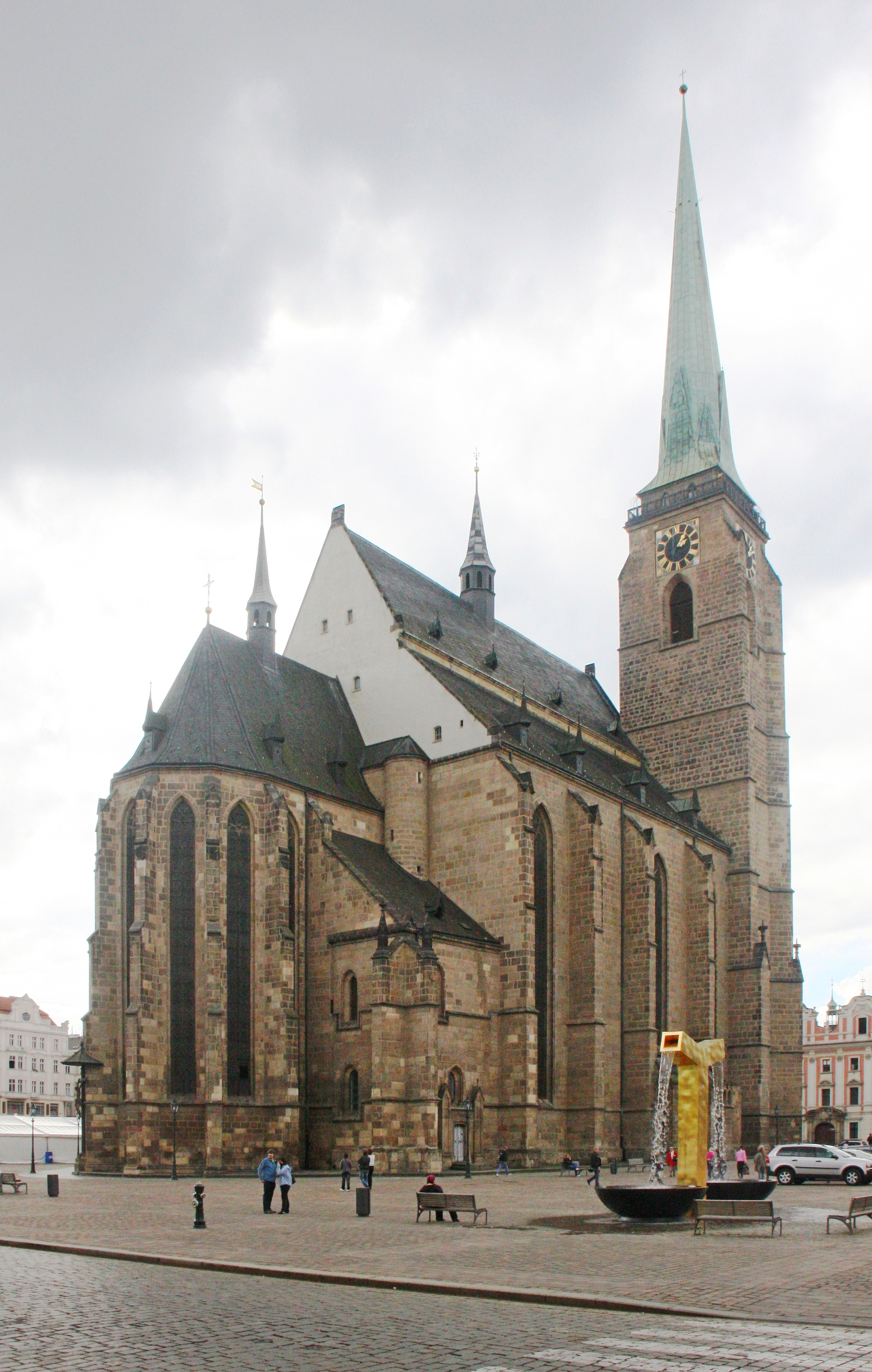
Cathedral of St. Bartholomew

The Square of the Republic (in Czech Naměstí republiky) forms the historical centre of Plzeň, Czech Republic. With a size of 552 by 627 feet (168 m × 191 m) it is one of the largest medieval squares in the Czech lands.

Plzeň as a town appears at the end of the 13th century, the square existing since then. Around the oblong square regular blocks of houses delimitated by a rectangular network of streets were built.

Archaeologists have identified wooden pavement from the 13th century and another three layers of pavement from the 14th century. The square was cobblestoned in 1859. The stones were replaced by asphalt cover in the 20th century; this replaced again with cobblestones during 2005-2007 reconstruction.

In the beginning of the 16th century the water supply became critical. A water tower with a mechanical pump was erected, the water being stored in a leaden reservoir and fed through wooden pipes to public fountains at the main square.

A graveyard had existed on the square since the town was established until 1789, when Emperor Joseph II ordered to close such graveyards.

The buildings in the square are predominantly built in Gothic and Renaissance styles. In the courtyards east side remains of the medieval walls are still preserved. The best preserved part of the square is its southern part.

Many buildings contain two or three levels of cellars used to preserve food, for wells or as cesspools.

The most important historical landmarks are Church of St. Bartholomew (1295, since 1993 a cathedral), the city hall (the building serves as city hall since 1496) and St. Mary's plague column from 1681 by the Plzeň sculptor Kristian Widman, all in the northern part of the square.

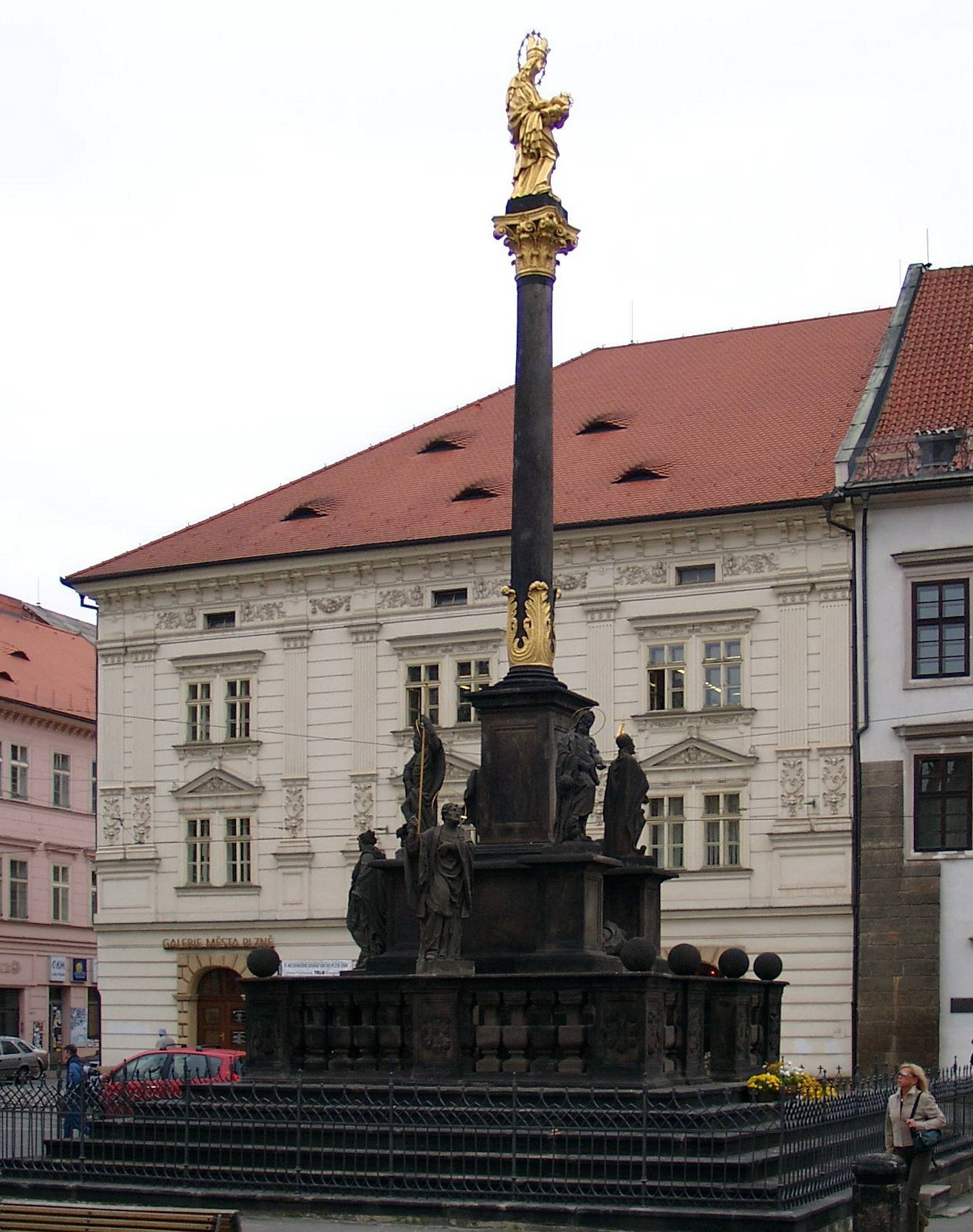
Plague column

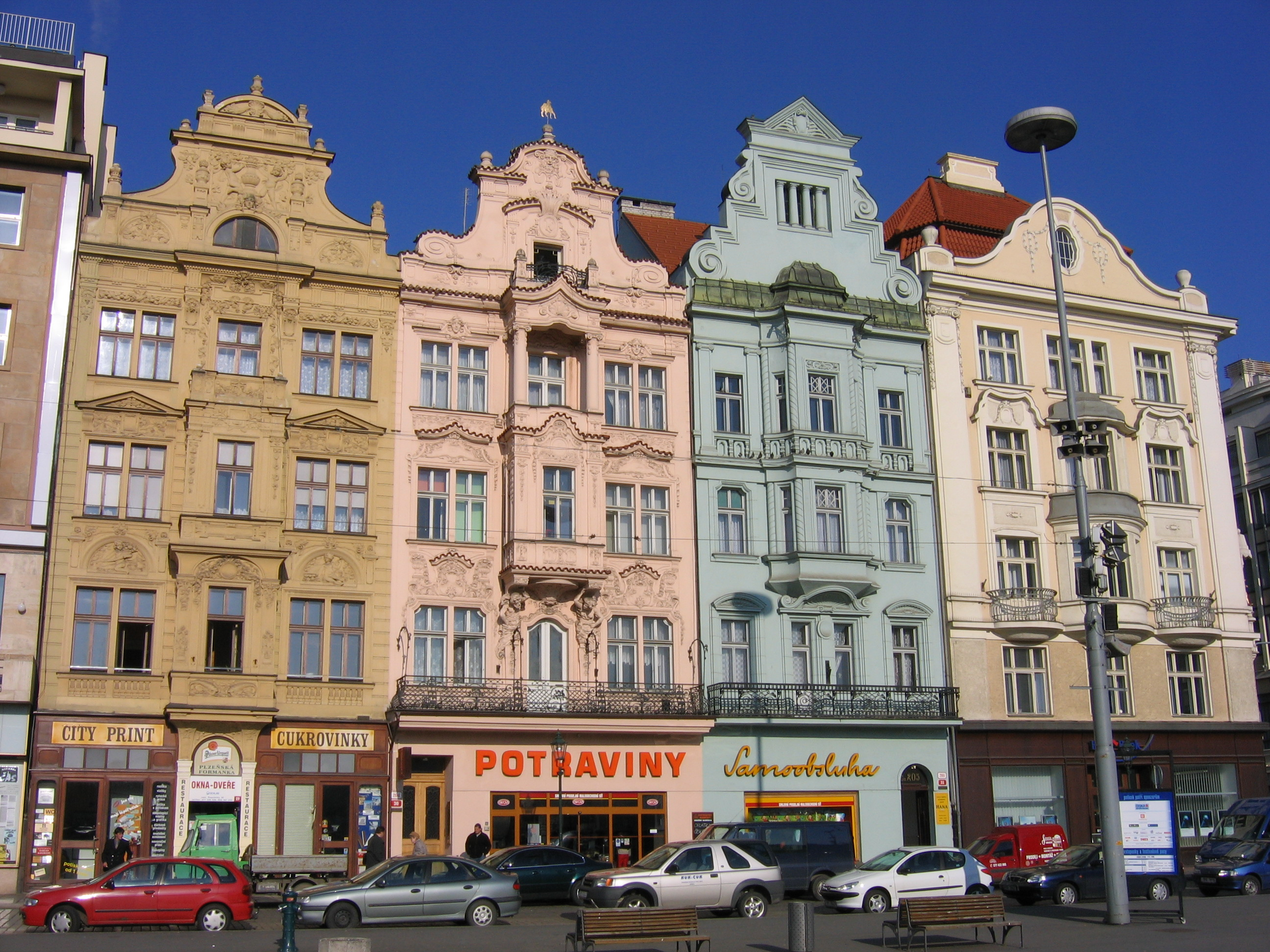
Historical houses

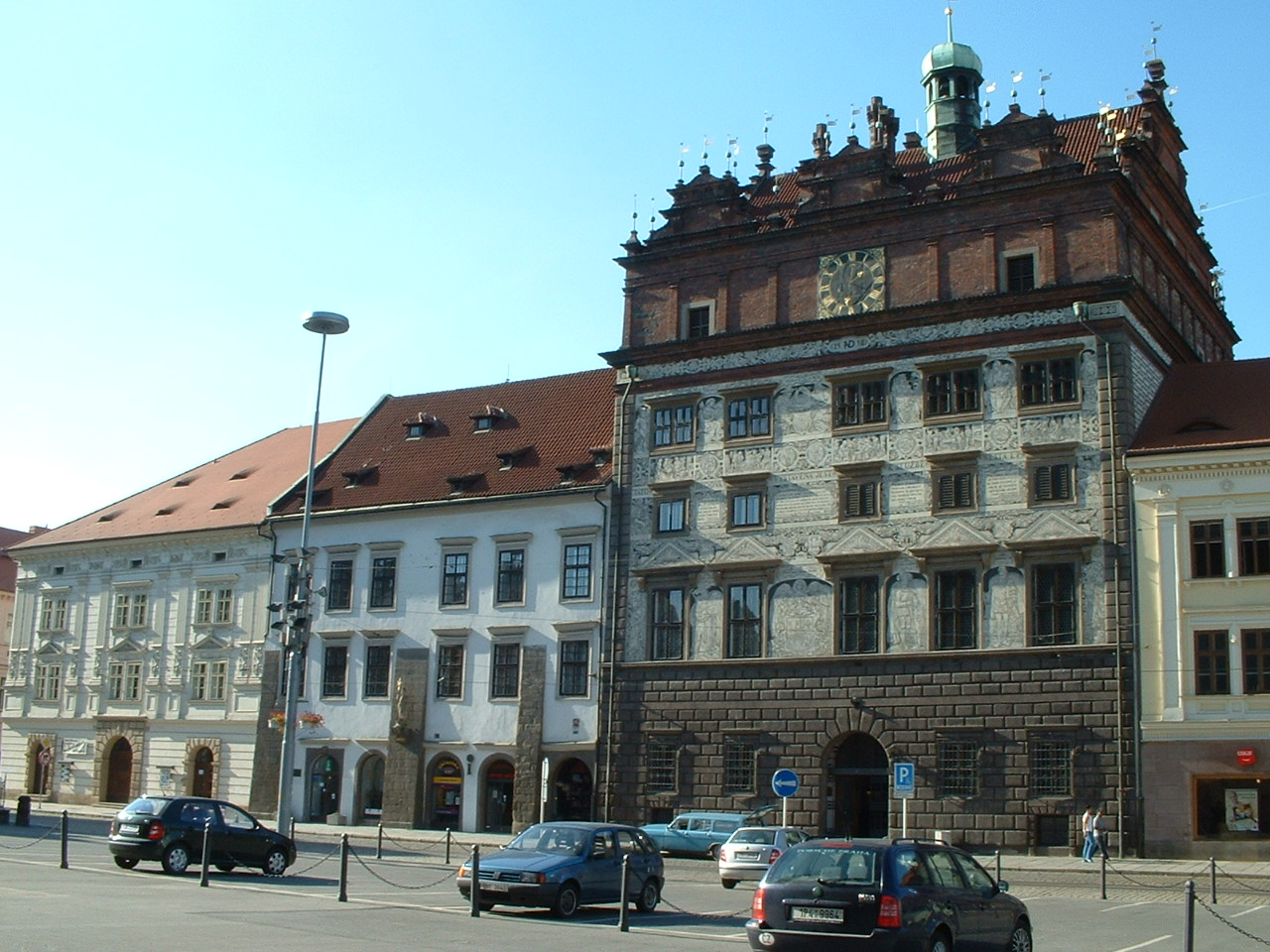
City hall

Cathedral of St. Bartholomew, before 1892
