= Cathedral of St. Bartholomew, Plzeň =

Cathedral of St. Bartholomew
- Katedrála svatého Bartoloměje
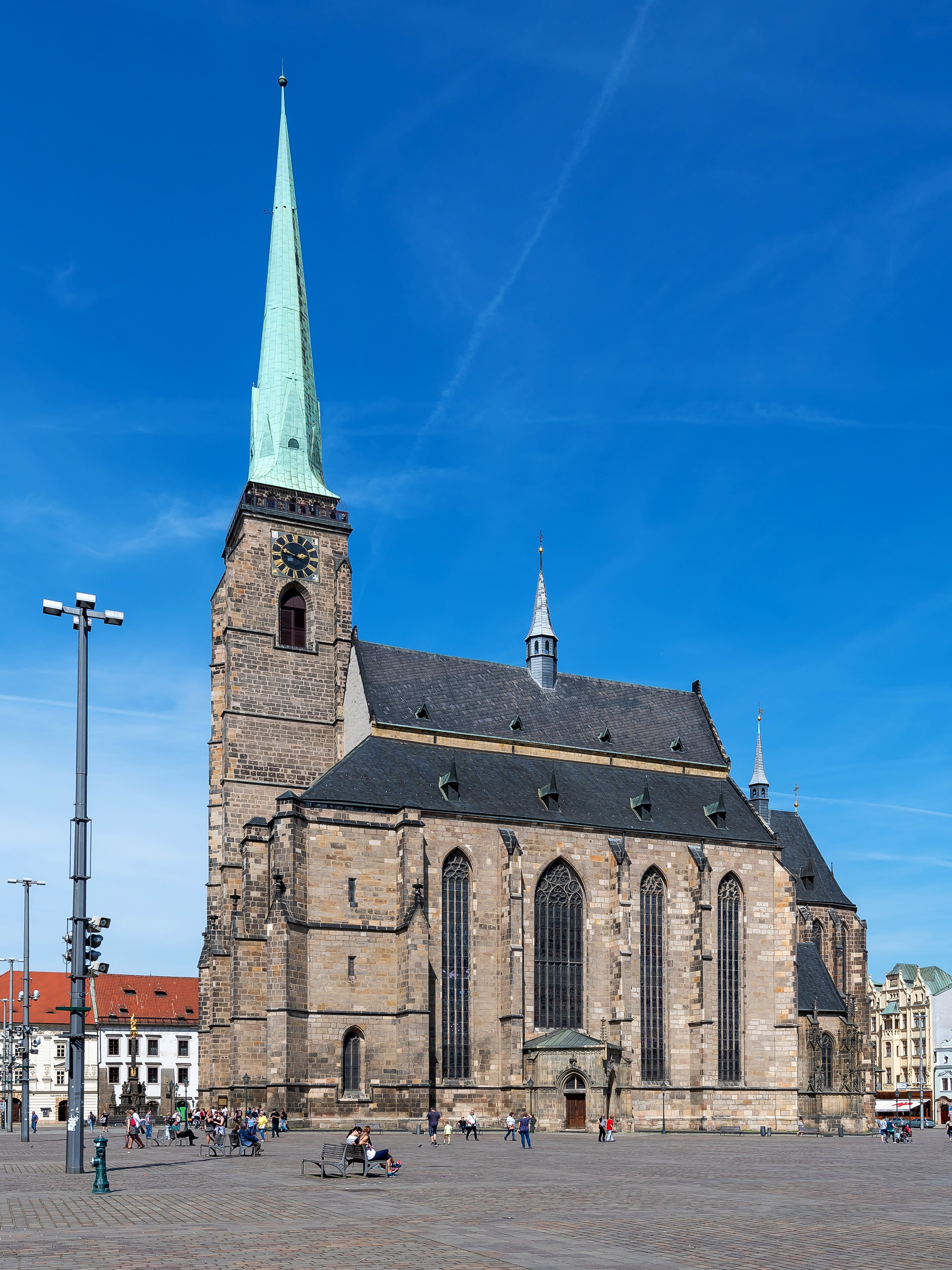

- Location in Czech Republic
- 49°44′51″N 13°22′39″E
- Location: Plzeň
- Country: Czech Republic
- Denomination: Roman Catholic
- Website: eng.katedralaplzen.org

History
- Former name: The Church of St Bartholomew
- Status: Active
- Founded: 1295
- Dedication: Bartholomew the Apostle

Architecture
- Functional status: Cathedral and Parish church
- Heritage designation: National cultural monument of the Czech Republic
- Architectural type: Church
- Style: Gothic
- Years built: 14th century

Specifications
- Length: 57.6 m (189 ft 0 in)
- Width: 26.0 m (85 ft 4 in)
- Height: 46 m (150 ft 11 in)

Administration
- Diocese: Plzeň

Clergy
- Bishop: František Radkovsky

The Cathedral of St. Bartholomew (Czech: Katedrála svatého Bartoloměje), originally the Church of St. Bartholomew, is a Gothic church located on the Main Square in Plzeň, Czech Republic. It was probably established together with the city around the year 1295. The church became a cathedral in 1993, when the Plzeň diocese was created. It was designated a national cultural monument of the Czech Republic in 1995.

== The History of the church/cathedral ==
The Cathedral of St. Bartholomew was established probably simultaneously with the city of Plzen around the year 1295. Originally, it was only an affiliated branch of the Church of All Saints in Malice, which is a part of the Roudná neighbourhood. The patron of both churches was the Czech king; in 1310 the King Henry of Bohemia (1265–1335) bestowed the patronal right upon the Teutonic Order. However, the same year, the king was banished from the Czech country and the Order didn't dare to take hold of their right. The Teutonic Order finally enforced this right from John of Bohemia (1296–1346) in 1322. However, next problem arose with the conflict over a presbytery with the Church of All Saints, resulting in favour of the Teutonic Order in 1342. The takeover of the clergy houses therefore probably became the motive for the initiation of the church construction. The Teutonic Order remained its patron until 1546, when the city of Plzeň got the abovementioned patronal right. The Diocese of Plzeň was established by Pope John Paul II on 31 May 1993, and then the parish church became a cathedral, the urban church of the bishop.

=== The Origin of the church ===
The exact date of the start of its construction is not known, but the oldest extant allusion comes from the year 1307, when the townsman Wolfram Zwinillinger bequeathed the malt and drying factory to St. Bartholomew with the condition of serving a church mass on behalf of his soul. Therefore, it could be estimated that the church could have been established approximately around the same year as the city of Plzeň - shortly after 1295. However, it is not known where it stood. The placement of the church on a public market place was a very unusual solution. The construction of the church started with the presbytery after 1342. The presbytery seems shorter in comparison to usual proportions of a typical presbytery. This is caused by its partial destruction during the construction of the nave and side aisles. The presbytery reached up to the first pair of pillars in the nave and therefore the size of the presbytery had to be adjusted. The pillars were supposed to be shorter, which was changed after the 1360s, mainly because the presbytery was enlarged.

The main nave and side aisles were being constructed since approximately 1375. First, the double-tower frontage was established and then it continued towards the already standing presbytery. The plan was to build two towers, the northern and the southern, out of which the southern was never finished.

The sacristy was constructed on the northern side of the presbytery together with the tower. The walls of the nave and side aisles were fully built until the beginning of the Hussite Wars (around the 1420s). The height of the northern tower did not exceed the height of the cornice. The church was roofed only with a frame shaped into a tall tent roof, with a tower for smaller bells. This enabled the usage of the church even before it was finished.

=== The era after the Hussite Wars ===
The construction of the church continued after the Hussite Wars. The side portals were built up at the beginning of the 15th century. After 1476, the nave and side aisles were roofed with net vaults on circular supports. The architect, who was probably Mister Erhard Bauer from Eichstätt (15. century in Eichstätt – 1493) changed the original plan because the pillars were designed to be cornered. At this time, the construction of the southern tower was already being dropped out, because it was against the aesthetic opinions of the era. Subsequently, the nave and side aisles were roofed with a tented roof, culminating into a small tower, which was just a little smaller than the future northern tower (it was still under construction at the time). The Sternberg Chapel, an important part of the church, was added to the southern part of the presbytery in the 1470s and 1480s. It was supposed to serve as a funerary chapel of the Sternberg family. The author was Hans Spiess (died 1503), working for the king Vladislaus II on a close castle Křivoklá at the time. In 1472 Jaroslav of Sternberg (1220–1287) was buried in the church, probably in the just finished chapel. In the same year, the ante-room was added to the southern portal with the details of the decoration consistent with the decoration of the chapel. A vast fire destroyed Plzeň in 1525 and the roof frame of the church burned down. Subsequently, in 1528, the tent roof was replaced with a saddle roof, which remained until today. The northern ante-room was added in first third of the 16th century, in a little less decorative manner than the Sternberg Chapel and southern ante-room. The Renaissance dormers were built in 1580.

=== 18th century until today ===
==== 19th century ====
The cathedral before 1892

In the second half of the 18th century, the organ-loft was extended. On 6 February 1835, a thunderbolt caused a fire on the northern tower. Two years later, the tower was newly roofed under the supervision of the builder František Filous (*1799-1869) – it was only a simplified copy of the original post-gothic roof.

In 1870, as a result of a windstorm, the eastern gable fell down onto the presbytery and the Sternberg Chapel - it threw off the dome together with the keystone. The reconstruction lead the architect Josef Mocker (1835-1899) in 1879-1883 – he was a specialist for the purist reconstructions and influenced Czech gothic purism with his work in the 2nd half of the 19th century. Beside the repair of the presbytery vault, he replaced the main old baroque altar with a new one, designed by himself, which was typical for the era. He removed old renaissance dormers from the roofs and more than 24 mostly baroque altars from the interior.

==== 20th century ====
In 1914–1920 a vast restoration of the church and the Sternberg Chapel took place under supervision of the architect Kamil Hilbert (1869–1933), who was also responsible for finishing the St. Vitus Cathedral in Prague. The last reconstruction of the church up till now happened in 1987. The project for static securing of the church and the tower and also the repair of the roof cloak was made by the architect Šantavý.

== Location and architectural description ==
=== Location ===
The church is located on the northern side of the square, which is quite an unusual placing with regard to the era. In most of the planned established cities (not only in the western Czech Republic) the church was placed outside the square, next to the city rampart. The main reason for this was a much calmer and quieter atmosphere than the city market.

=== Architectural description ===
==== General description ====
The temple is designed as a hall church with main nave and two side aisles, with four bays and a two-tower bays on the western side. On the west is located the presbytery with two dome bays, closed on a polygonal with five sides of a dodecagon. The church is accessible with the main entrance in the western frontage, and with two side entrances with ante-rooms on the northern and southern side of the church. The sacristy is connected to the presbytery on the north, together with a palatal depository. On the southern side from the presbytery is situated the Sternberg Chapel. The cathedral is 58 m long, 30 m wide and 25 m tall. The church tower is 103 m tall and it is the tallest church tower in the Czech Republic.

==== Exterior ====
The lining materials of the cathedral are hewn sandstone blocks, originating from the stone quarries to the north from the historical core. The masonry is encircled by a plinth around the whole perimeter and ends with a moulding in the upper part.

The western frontage was originally established as a two-tower one. The towers were supposed to be supported by vigorous pillars, reaching up to the cornices of both towers. Ultimately, this happened only on the realized northern tower. In case of the unfinished southern tower, the pillars are ending right under the cornice carrying the roof, in contrast to the supporting pillars of the walls, which are terminating a little lower. In the floor plan, the pillars are graduated once, in the height of 16 m. On the southern tower are represented the same palatal cornices found on the northern tower. The ground windows are pointed and windows in the upper floors are rectangular. The windows next to the bell stool are again pointed. Above them, the clock is located.

In the middle part of the western frontage is located a Gothic spiky portal with a glass tympanum, the outer archivolt of the portal is encircled by crockets, culminating in a finial. The linings of the portal were used for placing the statues of Virgin Mary and John the Evangelist, who together with Christ on the cross created the group "Crucifixion". Between the portal and the floor cornice is located the niche with the baroque statue of the Saint Bartholomew. Above the portal there is a pointed window with a neo-gothic tracery. The simple gable on the middle nave can also be included into the western frontage.

On the side frontages, northern and southern, we can find only slight differences – they are very similar to the other frontages. On the western corner, there are supporting pillars of the tower and the frontages are then divided into five fields by other pillars. The first field next to the western corner is solved in the same manner as the western two-tower frontage. The other fields contain pointed windows, which are divided into four parts in the second and fifth field, similar for both frontages. In the third field on the southern side there is a seven-part window. On the northern side, there is a six-part window. In the fourth field, the number of parts is again different – on the south the window is a four-part one, on the north a two-part one. In the linings of all the windows we can find deep cavettos. The traceries are mostly Rayonnant, Spherical and Cloverleafed.

Although the side portals are nowadays located in the interior of the ante-rooms, they were originally designed as the parts of the frontage, and that is why it is important to describe them together with the frontages. The southern portal is richer than the northern one, because it used to be opened into a greater area of the square. Therefore, the decorativeness of this part was much more important. The individual rods of the pointed lining jut out of small plinths. The lining continuously continues into a square bordering. Crocket is used as a decoration for both archivolts and the bordering. The northern portal is designed in a very similar manner.

Both portals were provided with ante-rooms between 15th and 16th century. The ante-room in the southern part of the church has a pentagonal floor-plan with a pinnacle on the corner, decorated with an effigy on the bottom (probably the self-portrait of the builder Hans Spiess). The visitor enters the ante room through two pointed portals with linings shaped into torus and cavettos. Above the square door openings there are lintels. On the walls of the ante-room there is a segmentation similar to the one used on the Sternberg Chapel. The ante-room on the northern side has a rectangular floor plan reaching slightly over the border of the pillars. The entrances have profiled linings, whose rods jut out of plinths. Above the cornice there is an attic, whose battlement shape enables water runoff. The ante-room is roofed with a shed roof with a gable dormer.

The presbytery of the church is quite small in comparison to the size of the church. Its masonry is encircled by a plinth culminating into a window-sill cornice. The windows of the presbytery are divided into two parts, except for the axial window, which is a three-part one. Their traceries are quite similar, the main motif is a spherical triangle, for example in case of the middle window decorated with double or triple leaves. Two windows on the north and one window on the south are walled. In case of the southern window, this happened due to the adjustment of the connection of the presbytery with the nave, which was extended beyond the original plan. The pillars of the presbytery are smaller than pillars in the other parts of the cathedral. They are triple and the shed roofs on the tops have little gables. We can see decorations in shape of shields with German knight's signs on them.

The northern part of the presbytery is connected to a sacristy with the multi-storey depository. It is covered with a shed roof, the parts are divided by a window-sill cornice. In the corner between the nave and the presbytery there is a tube coming out of the sacristy, with a spiral staircase inside leading to an attic above the presbytery. The windows on the northern side are not placed above each other, and the reason for this is a different solution for the vaults in the interior. The outer entrance is decorated with a small portico in neo-gothic style. On the eastern side there is a two-part pointed window for each of the two floors.

There is the Sternberg Chapel on the southern side of the presbytery, closed with three sides. In the corners there are supporting pillars, and between them, in each of the three fields are placed windows. Above the window-sill cornice, the pillars are decorated with triangular gables culminating in pinnacles. The traceries of the windows have similar Rayonnant motives. The chapel is covered with a hipped roof.

==== Interior ====
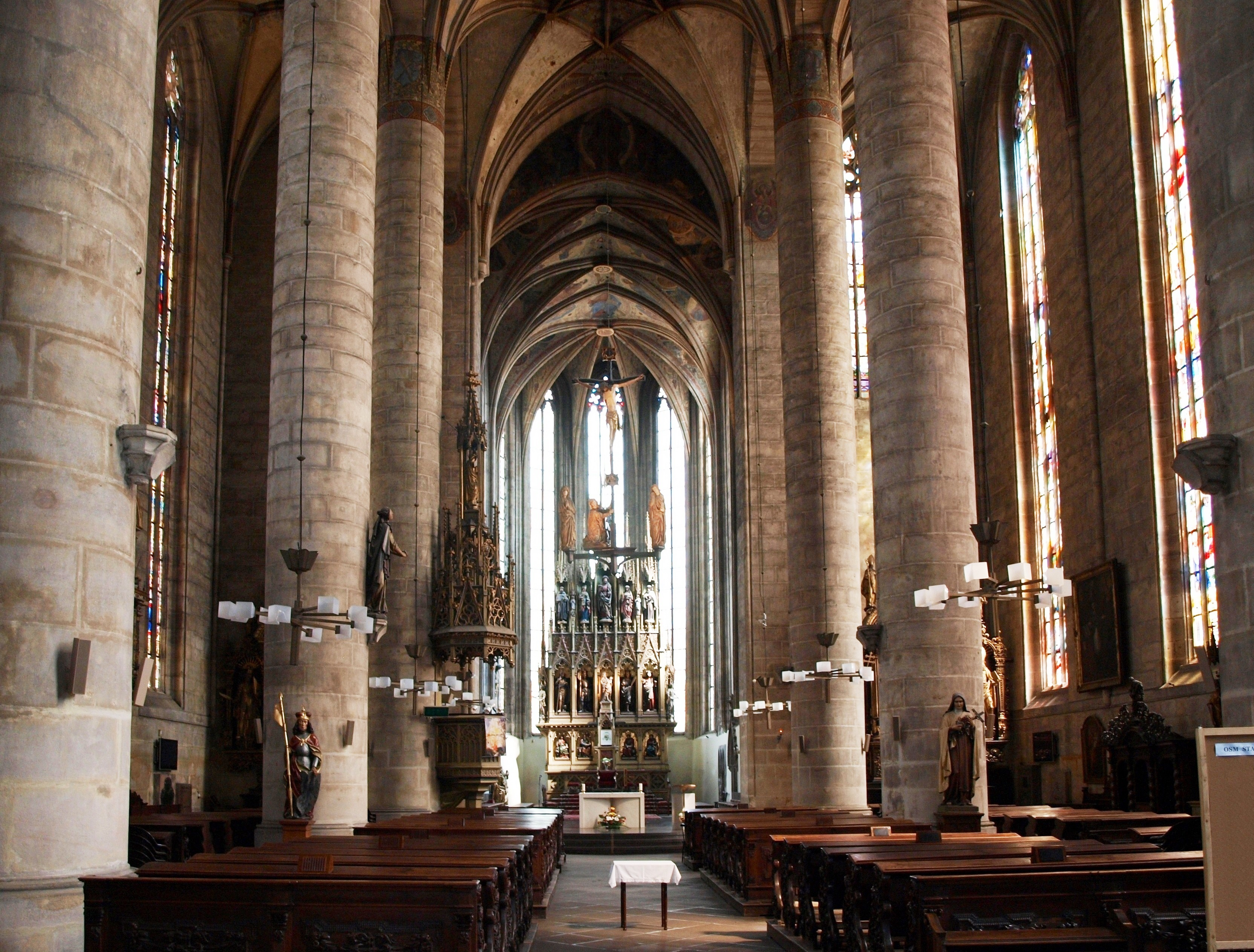
Interior

The presbytery is sectionalized by linear pear-shaped beam supports continuously merging into a baldachin vault. The entrance into the presbytery is provided with an arch of triumph, taller than the presbytery itself. The difference of heights is solved with a plane with representation of Jesus Christ as the judge at the Last Judgement. Into the sacristy and chapel lead two neo-gothic portals with linings shaped into pointed arch with crockets on the outer part and finial on the top. The vaults are decorated with paintings by Karl Jobst from 1883.

The planned double-tower frontage is represented in the interior by massive pillars with cross profiles, turned into the main nave with pointed half-pillars. The vault under the southern tower is solved with a simple four-pointed star with middle cross ribs. The entrance space is vaulted with a four-pointed star vault complemented with a diagonal cross with pear-shaped supports.

The inner space of the naves is encircled with a window-sill cornice around the perimeter, which continue into cylindrical supports with cantilevers on top. From there on, vault supports are passing up. In the southern aisle on the eastern wall, there is the pointed entrance portal into the Sternberg Chapel. The windows along the aisles, four on every side of the church, have a distinctive cylindrical profile in the linings.

The vault of the nave is supported with cylindrical pillars standing on a circular plinth. There are probably located the foundations of the original pillars with square profiles under these pillars, similar to the shape of the arch of triumph's supports' feet, suggesting the same architectural concept. The pillars under the tower also show a later change of the vaulting plan, since the jugs of the vault ribs show the original plan of using the cross vault. They use a tracery vault, therefore these ribs had to be additionally turned and duplicated.

On the western side of the aisles in the space between the towers id located a church-gallery, in the height of approximately 8 m. By the end of the 16th century it was enlarged with the help of the vault bars supported with cross pillars. Other adjustments were then made in the 1760s, when the church-gallery was extended into the space of the nave.

The sacristy is located on the ground floor, in the area of the extension to the northern part of the presbytery. It has a rectangular floor plan and includes two fields of vaulting. In the bigger field there is a star net vault, in the smaller there is a simple cross vault. The vault ribs have a similar pear-shaped profile. In the south-western corner of the sacristy there is a spiral staircase, leading to the depository above the sacristy.

The depository originally functioned as an almarium, later as a tracery for the storage of valuable liturgical objects. The space is vaulted with two fields of cross vaulting. According to certain inaccuracies, we can tell that they were probably constructed for different spaces. Into the space of the depository they were inserted additionally. The ribs have a pear-shaped profile again.

The staircase continues to the attic space above the presbytery. According to the contemporary artwork, we can deduce that this part of the staircase was added around the time of reconstructions in 1879–1883, which is also visible on a slight different shape of this staircase than the one leading from the sacristy to the depository.

== The Description of the Decorations ==
The most valuable decoration of the church is the argillite sculpture of the Plzeň Madonna (from around 1390) in the middle of the main pseudo-gothic altar designed by the architect Josef Mocker. An extraordinary work of gothic woodcraft is also a monumental group of statues "The Calvary" from the 1460s. There is an entrance from the main nave to the late gothic Sternberg Chapel in the right part of the church, where also the Czech Altar is located – an Art Nouveau work of the carver Jan Kastner. In the church, we can also find colourful stained glass windows, such as the window with Calvary motive by local painter Josef Mandl, or works by other influential artists.

== Curiosities ==
The 27th chapel of the holy Saint Vitus Journey from Prague to Boleslav was dedicated to the Plzeň Madonna. This chapel was founded in the years 1674–1690. The donator of this chapel was Adolf Vratislav, the imperial count of Sternberg, the highest provincial judge. On 17 November 2014 the great tower of the cathedral obtained its bells again, except for one originally molten in the Netherlands for a contribution of a bell maker from Zbraslav, Rudolf Manoušek junior.

== Sternberg Chapel ==
At the beginning of the 16th century the Sternberg Chapel was added to the already existing Cathedral of St. Bartholomew in Plzeň. Its construction took place mainly due to certain power-influenced events. The noble Sternberg family chose this place as the family's eternal rest place.

=== Builders and the owners ===
The time of beginning of its construction and the name of its builder are unknown. However, one possible author is considered to be Hans Spiess, who at that time worked for the King Vladislaus II in the near castle Křivoklát. A source from the year 1472 is implying this information, since it says that at the time Jaroslav of Sternberg (son of Ladislav of Sternberg) was buried in the castle – quite possibly in the just finished chapel. Due to its architectural details, it is possible to deduce the work of the builder of the Saint Vitus Cathedral, the architect Kamil Hilbert, who supervised the restoration of the church in the years 1914–1920. He also set the era after the year 1510 as the most probable time of the origin of this monument, which also agrees with former messages about the lives of the Sternberg family in Zelená Hora and broader Plzeň country.

Art-historical analysis of the chapel also shows that the builder was not the well/known Czech builder Benedikt Rejt; the dimensional curiosities of the chapel rather indicate the neighboring Luzice area. There, in the city of Zwickau, is located a cathedral built in the same era as the Sternberg Chapel, which shows eye-catching similarities between those two cathedrals. Therefore, there comes an assumption, that its builder was a man from Luzice. And because not only Ladislav of Sternberg, but also his predecessors had close relations to Lužice, it is possible, that the chapel builder took hold of a proficient in the area, where he had the best contacts and possibilities.

=== Exterior ===
The tall construction of the cathedral dictated the additional building to be slender and reginal. Massive stone walls were hidden by the builder by the beginning of the 16th century, so that they receded completely to the background.

An unusual decoration of the bottom part is worth noting – it is “paneled” around its entire width, which means that it is covered with carved Gothic tracery. Above this part under the windows and around the whole perimeter is located a massive ledge. From this ledge there are growing triangular pinnacles lying on supporting pillars. There are four pinnacles for each of the pillars – on the sides is one bigger pinnacle, two smaller in front, which converge at an acute angle. Large pinnacles are decorated with tracery – one with a circular eight-pointed star – the Sternberg sign. On the edges and in corners are added to the pillars slender pinnacles.

In the uppermost part the pillars slightly recede, the decoration is the same, just a bit simpler. They do not terminate with pinnacles, but with a skew deck called counter, over which grow to a considerable height massive pinnacles. They also protrude above the main cornice of the chapel and their weight is helping to increase the resistance of the pillars, into which converge arch ribs of the stone vault.

On the southeast wall above the window is located in the left corner stone sign of the Sternberg family in a decorative canopy, also terminating in a pinnacle.

The windows are wide, decorated with rich traceries with Rayonnant motives and each of them divided by two rods. The roof has not been preserved in the original form. Before the reconstruction, it was only an “emergency” roof – shed roof. Today, it is a new tent slate roof, which fully applies the slender contour of the chapel. The rafter construction is mostly cock-lofted, and as for the material, pine wood was used.

=== Interior ===
The vault of the Sternberg chapel is designed into an eight-pointed star, which was to be found on the shield of the Sternberg family. 7 suspended ribs are coming out of the star. They are connected deep beneath the vault with a decorative stud with figural motives, where again we can see the Sternberg sign. The belonging of the chapel was therefore properly emphasized.

On the southern wall near the floor tiles are located various niches. One of them, a wide and doubled one is a so-called sedilia – the seat for the priest. A wide segmented arched niche to the right was originally closed with a grating and served as a depository of worship utensils. Similarly narrow, tall and tapered side niche was used for special items – e.g. candles.

The original entrance to the chapel was in the north and it was possible to enter directly to the right nave of the church. In the 18th century there were two altars in the church, one on each side – the altar of St. Barbara and St. Catherine.

On the eastern side of the chapel stood the main altar on a stone Gothic-profiled table, still preserved today. Wooden architecture that was once depicted on it unfortunately disappeared. Since the beginning of the 17th century, i.e. since the reconstruction of the chapel by Ladislav of Sternberg, there were two other altars next to the main one, which however did not lie on stone tables; they were made fully of wood. These altars were not built next to the walls, they were touching them on the sides, so that one stood slightly in front of the main altar and next to the northern wall. Second, inversely, on the opposite side, the right side to the south wall.

After the restoration in the early 17th century the chapel only had painting decoration. The counting of paintings first occurred in 1765. At that time, on the epistle side hung Holy Family in black framework and underneath another painting of Our Lady of Sorrows. On the gospel side (left) was located a large painting of Saint Joseph on his deathbed, next to which stood Jesus and Mary with angels. At the entrance was hung a painting of Saint Rosalia.

Since the beginning of the 18th century were in the chapel also stored sculptures used in religious processions. Next to the main altar were located large sculptures of the Virgin Mary with Jesus and Saint Sebastian the martyr. Elsewhere are stored statues of the Immaculate Conception, St. Adalbert, bishop and martyr and St. Isidore. There was also a large sculpture of 12 Apostles, composed of three parts. Substantial parts of the church murals were preserved until today. They are the Lobkowicz and Sternberg signs with the relevant inscriptions, which decorate the northern wall. Then there remained several figures of the Saints on the western and southern wall, which show the original dedication of the chapel. There is the Virgin Mary, St. Wenceslaus and St. Barbara. The paintings are life-size, however they are faded and neglected and are waiting for a thorough restoration.

== Gallery ==
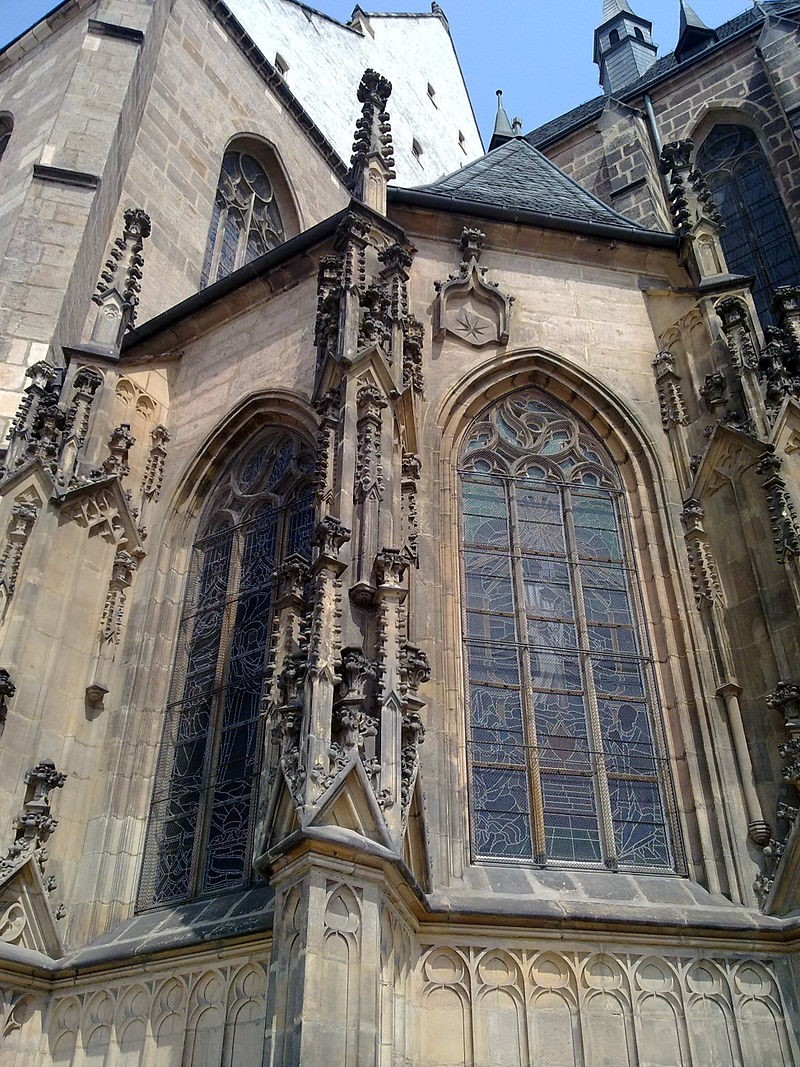
The pinnacle of the Sternberg Chapel

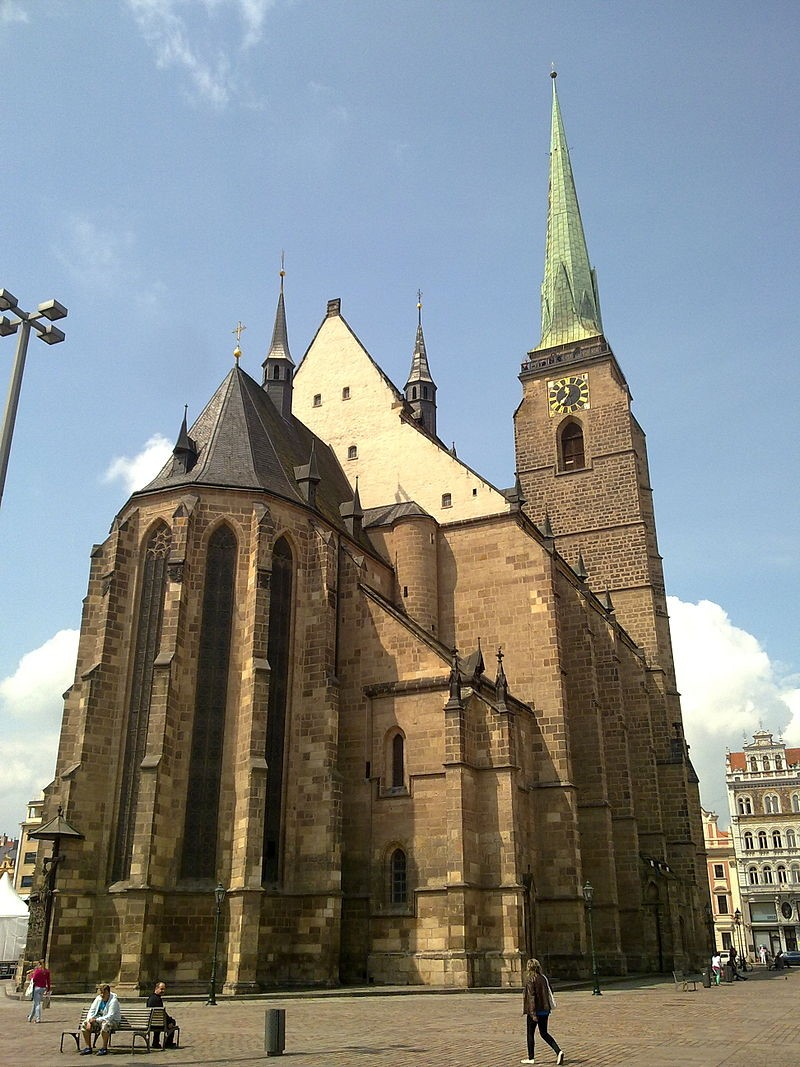
Eastern elevation of the church

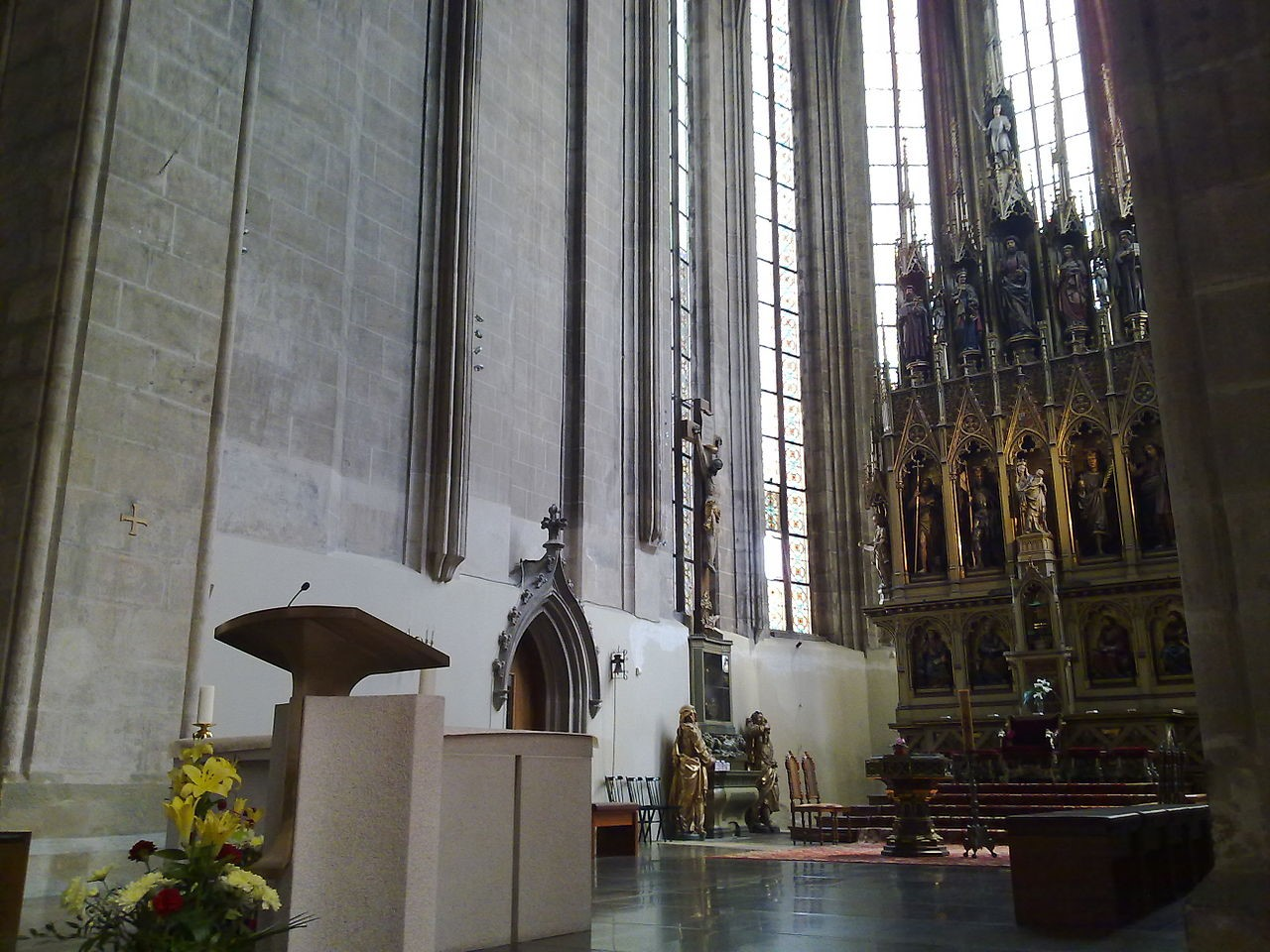
The presbytery

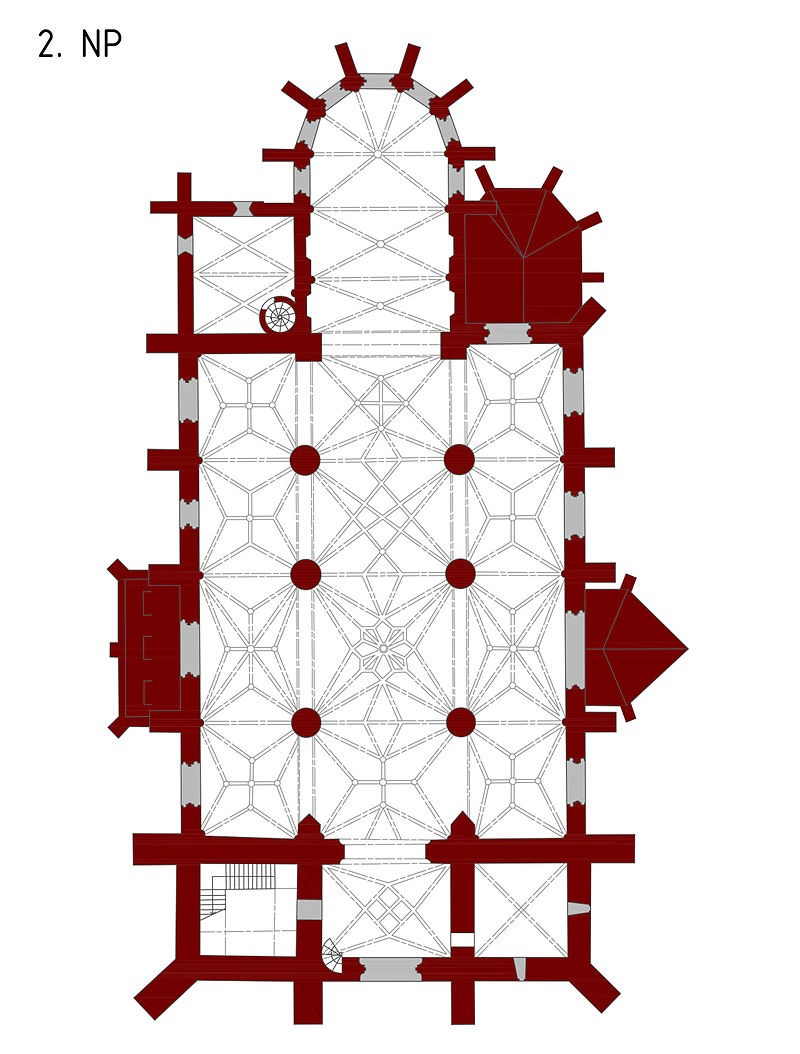
The floorplan

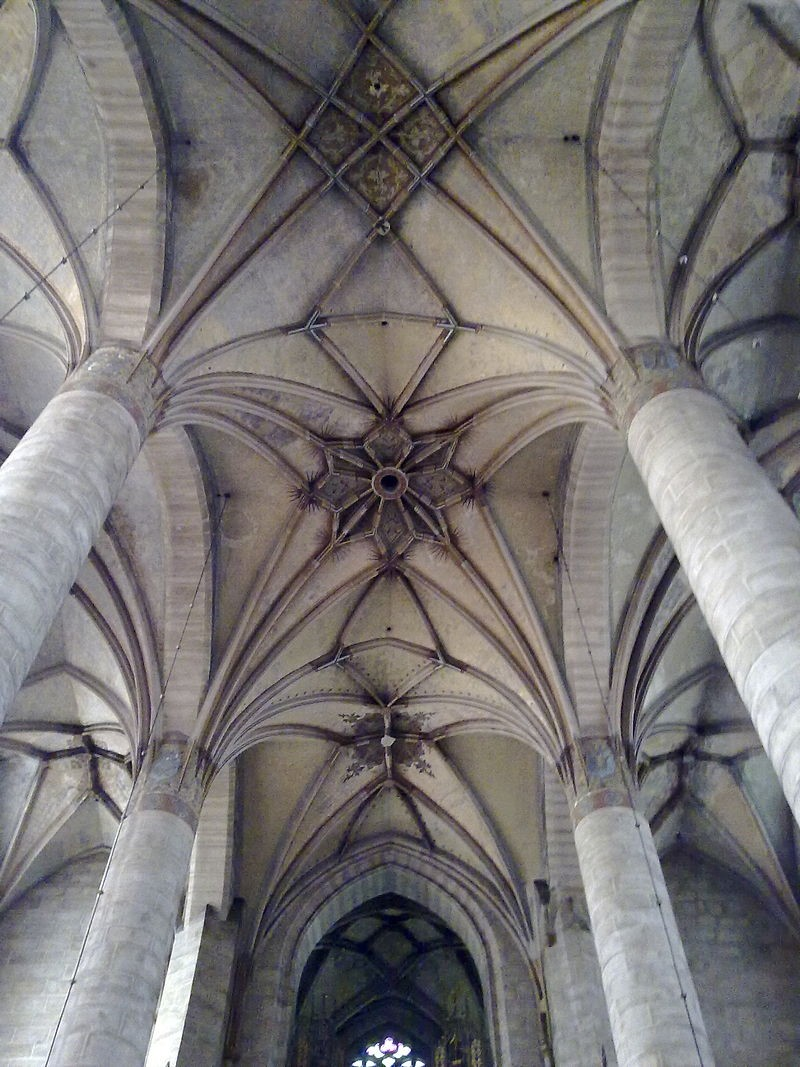
The main nave vault

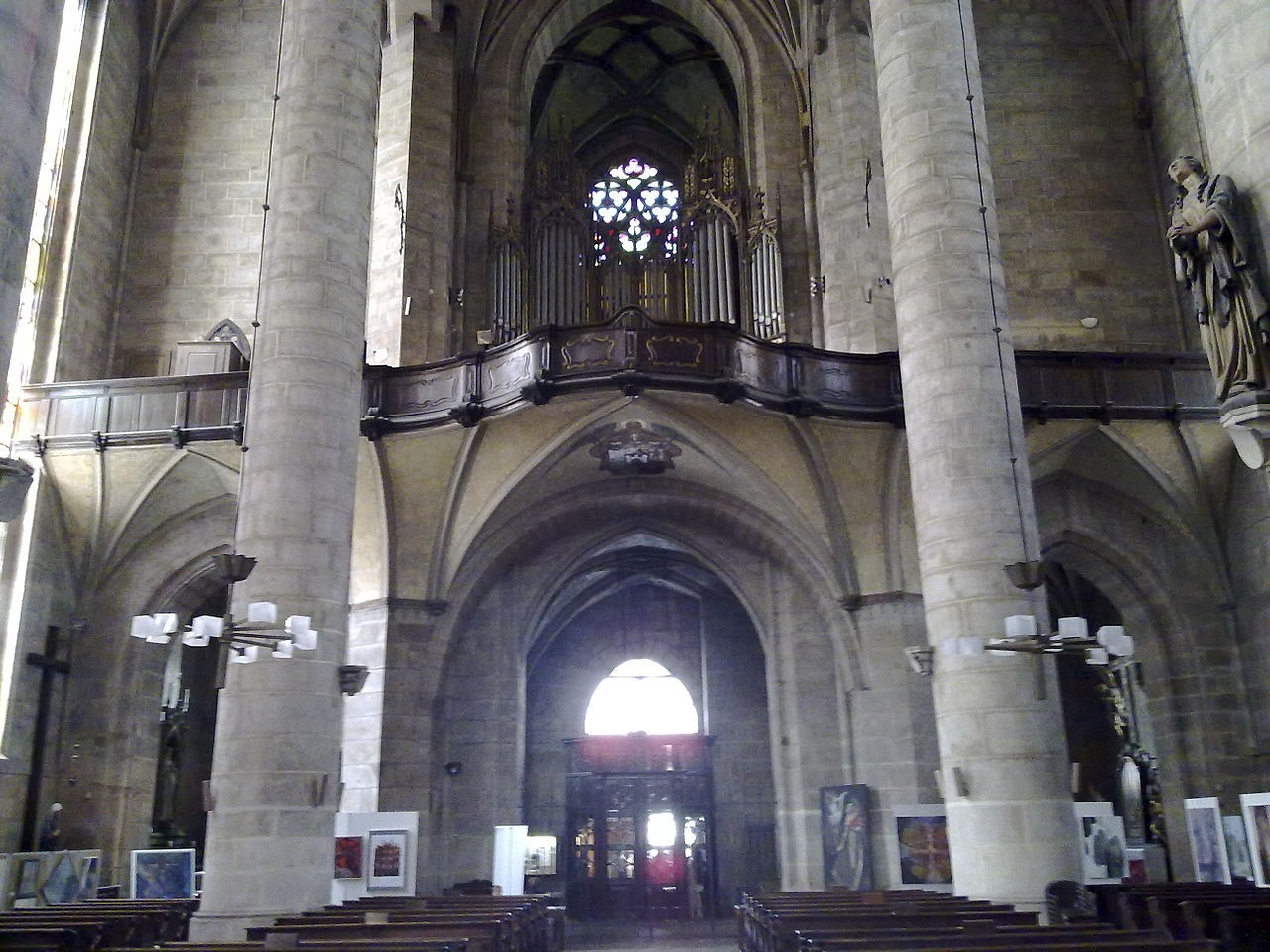
The choir

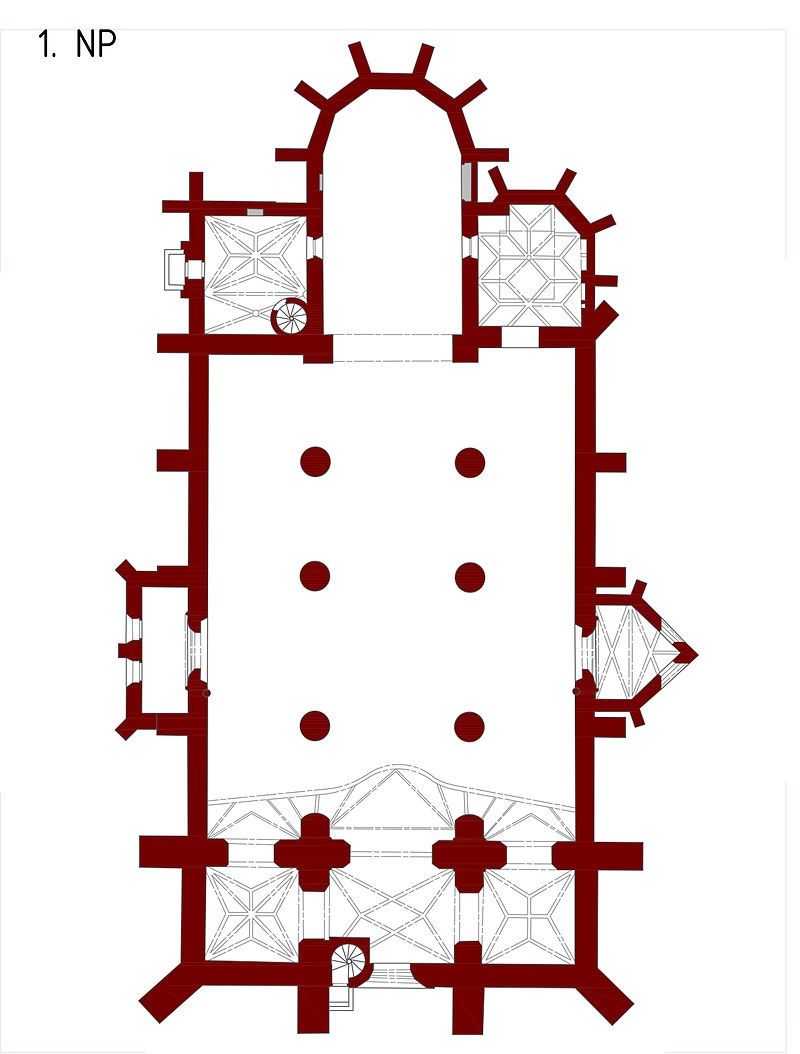
The second floorplan

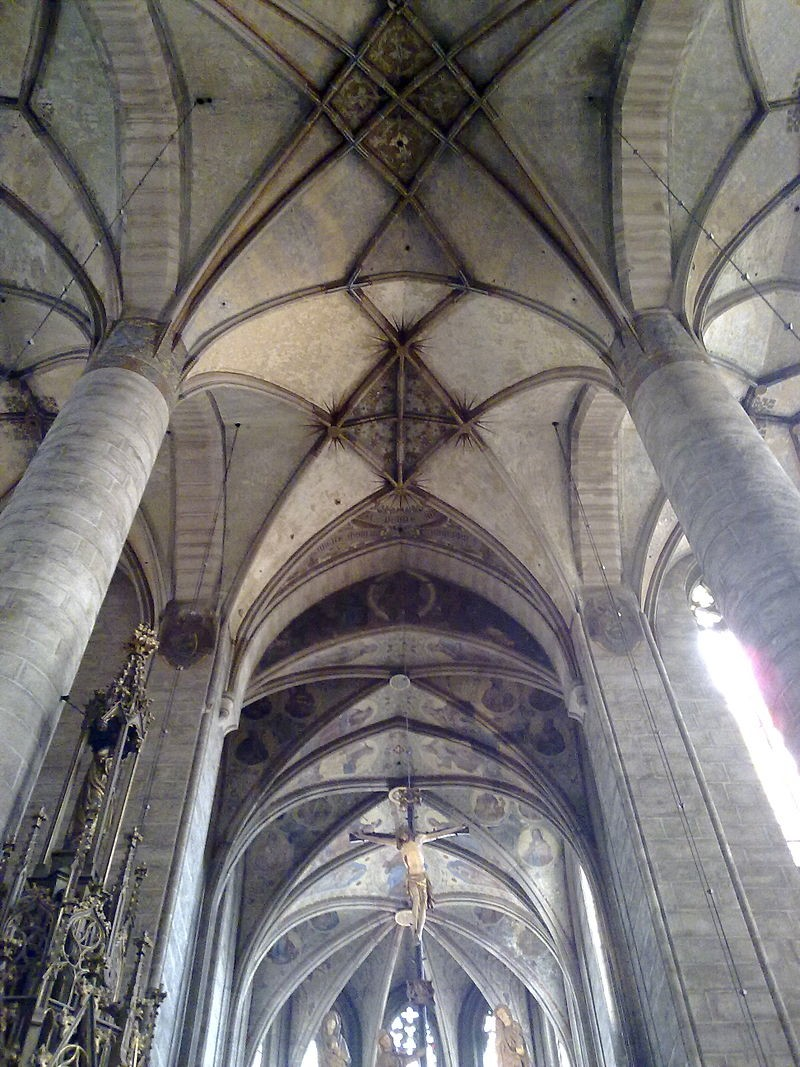
The vault of the presbytery

== See also ==
- List of tallest structures built before the 20th century

== Bibliography ==
- SOUKUP, Jan. Katedrála svatého Bartoloměje v Plzni. Plzeň: Agentura David a Jakub s.r.o., 2012. 176 p.
- MENCL, Václav. Česká architektura doby lucemburské. Prague 1948
- KOTRBA, Viktor: Architektura. Katalog architektury. In: PEŠINA Jaroslav (red.): České umění gotické 1350–1420. Praha 1970, pp. 56–111.
- POCHE, Emanuel. Umělecké památky Čech 3. Pragueha: Academia, 1980. 540 p.
- LÍBAL, Dobroslav. Gotická architektura. In: Dějiny českého výtvarného umění I/1. Prague 1984, pp. 144–215.
- LÍBAL, Dobroslav. Katalog gotické architektury v České republice do husitských válek. Prague: Unicornis, 2001.
- LÁBEK, Ladislav. Šternberská kaple v Plzni. Plzeň: Kroužek přátel starožistností, 1924. 56 p.
