= Diocese of Plzeň =

Latin Catholic diocese in Czechia

Coordinates: 50°N 13°E

Diocese of Plzeň Dioecesis Pilznensis Diecéze plzeňská

Catholic

Location
- Country: Czech Republic
- Ecclesiastical province: Prague
- Metropolitan: Prague

Statistics
- Area: 9,236 km^{2} (3,566 sq mi)
- Population: Total; Catholics: (as of 2019); 839,950; 117,800 (14%)

Information
- Denomination: Catholic Church
- Rite: Latin Rite
- Cathedral: Katedrála sv. Bartoloměje (Cathedral of St. Batholomew)

Current leadership
- Pope: Leo XIV
- Bishop: Tomáš Holub
- Bishops emeritus: František Radkovský

Map
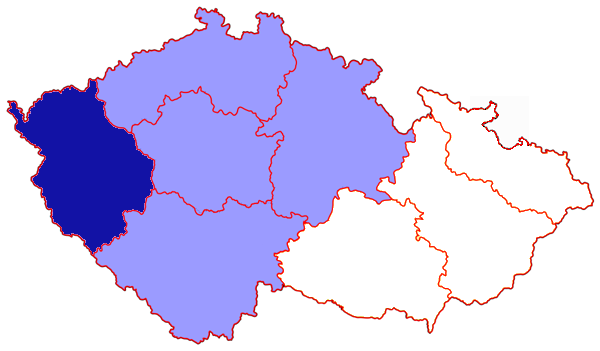

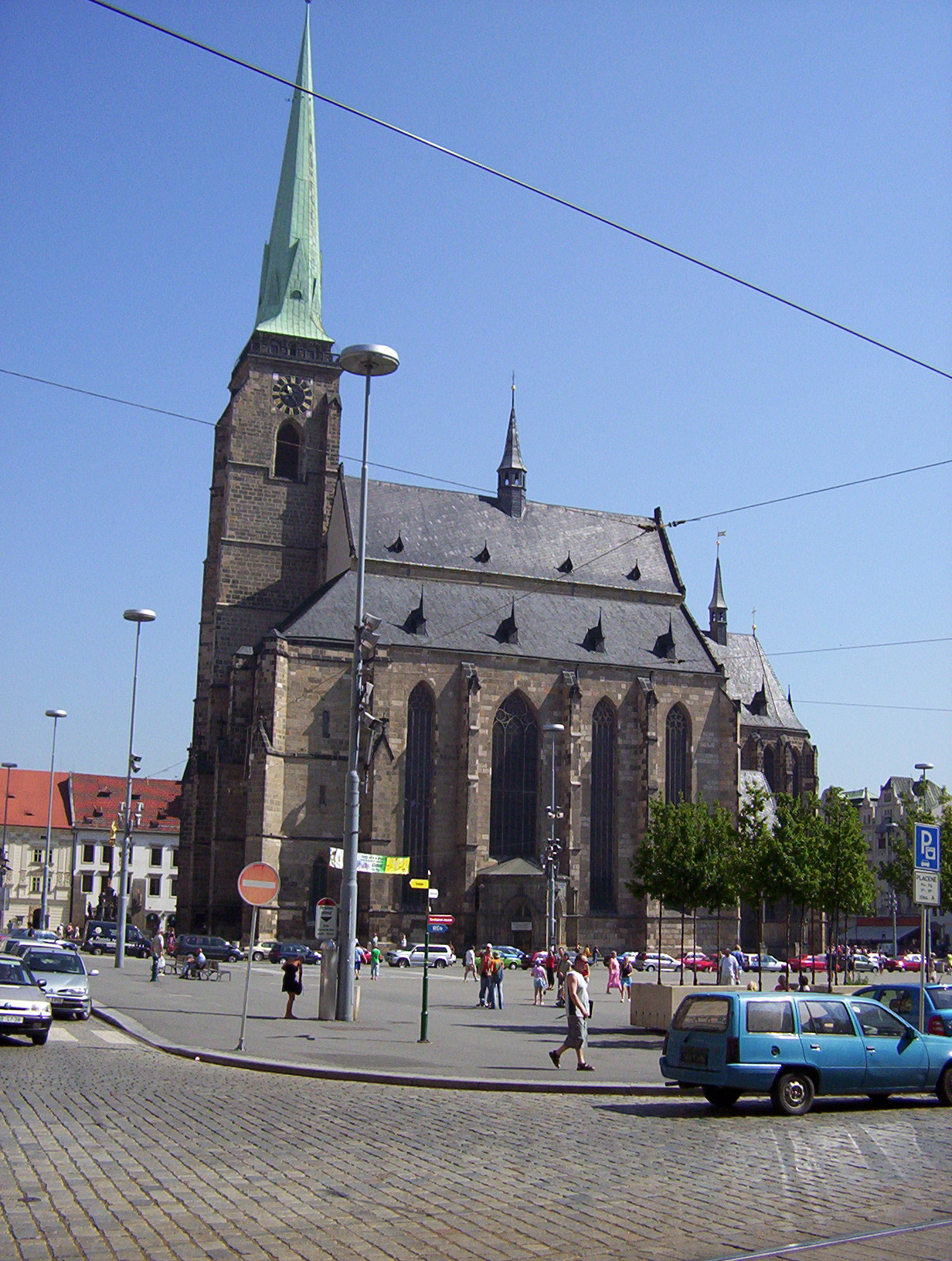
Cathedral of St. Bartholomew

The Diocese of Plzeň (Latin: Pilznen(sis)) is a diocese located in the city of Plzeň in the ecclesiastical province of Prague in the Czech Republic.

== History ==
- May 31, 1993: Established as Diocese of Plzeň from the Diocese of České Budějovice, Diocese of Litoměřice and Metropolitan Archdiocese of Prague

== Leadership ==
- Bishops of Plzeň (Roman rite)
  - Bishop František Radkovský (May 31, 1993)
  - Bishop Tomáš Holub (April 30, 2016)

== See also ==
- Catholic Church in the Czech Republic

== Sources ==
- GCatholic.org
- Catholic Hierarchy
- Diocese website
