= Avioccala =

Avioccala was a Roman and Byzantine era town in the Roman province of Africa Proconsularis in northern Tunisia. The town lasted from 30BC to about 640AD, and has been tentatively identified with the stone ruins at Sidi-Amara, Tunisia.

The city was endowed by a woman of senatorial rank, Osica Modesta Cornelia Patruina Publiana, and a statue of her has been found in the ruins.

The town was also the seat of a Catholic bishopric in the ecclesiastical province of Carthage. Although the diocese ceased to function in the end of the 7th century, the diocese remains a titular see in the Roman Catholic Church. Known bishops include:

- Donatus (Donatist bishop fl 316)
- Cresconius (Donatist bishop fl 411)
- Robert James Carlson

== See also ==
- Henchir Sidi Amara in Byzacena.
