= Třešť =

- Town
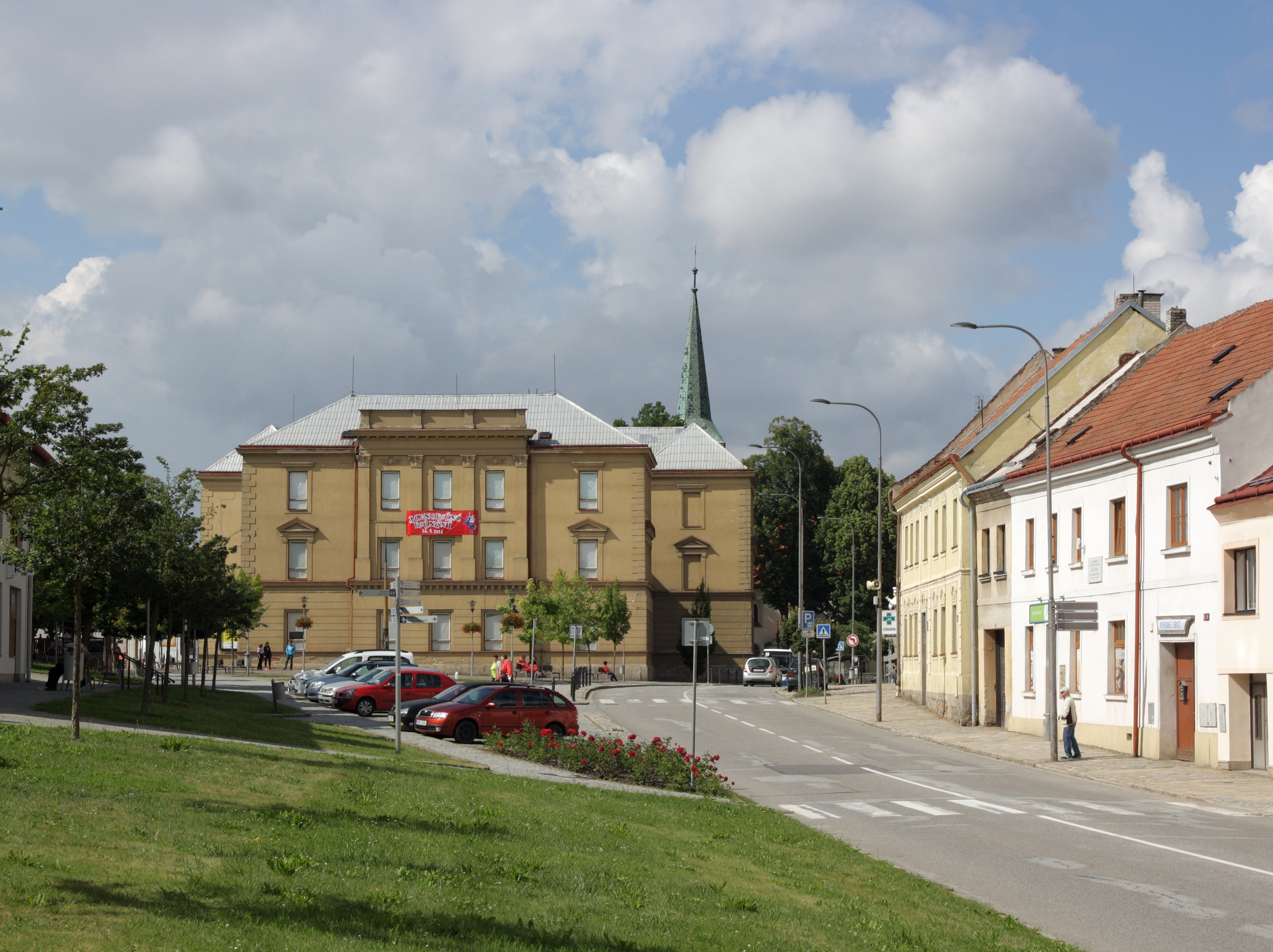
- T. G. Masaryka Square

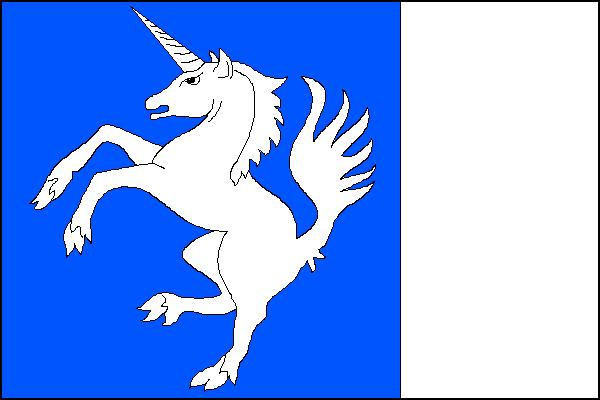
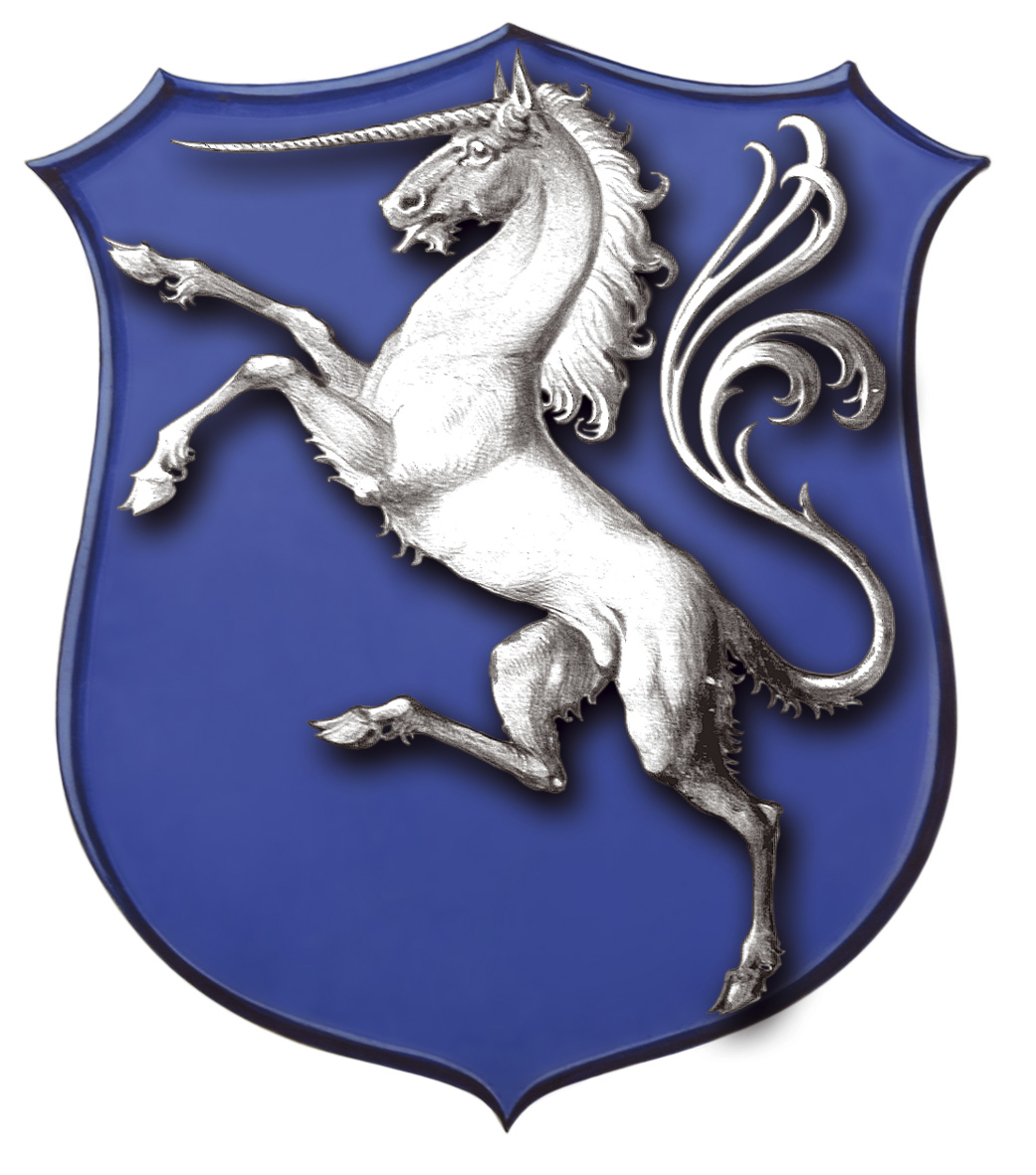
- Flag Coat of arms

- Location in the Czech Republic
- Coordinates: 49°17′27″N 15°28′56″E
- Country: Czech Republic
- Region: Vysočina
- District: Jihlava
- First mentioned: 1349

Government
  - Mayor: Vladislav Hynk

Area
  - Total: 46.99 km^{2} (18.14 sq mi)
- Elevation: 545 m (1,788 ft)

Population (2026-01-01)
  - Total: 5,801
  - Density: 123.5/km^{2} (319.7/sq mi)
- Time zone: UTC+1 (CET)
  - Summer (DST): UTC+2 (CEST)
- Postal code: 589 01
- Website: www.trest.cz

Třešť (Czech pronunciation: [ˈtr̝̊ɛʃc]; German: Triesch) is a town in Jihlava District in the Vysočina Region of the Czech Republic. It has about 5,800 inhabitants. The town is located on the stream Třešťský potok in the Křižanov Highlands.

Třešť was founded in the 14th century at the latest and became a town in 1901. The town used to have a large Jewish community. The historic town centre is well preserved and is protected as an urban monument zone.

== Administrative division ==
Třešť consists of four municipal parts (in brackets population according to the 2021 census):

- Třešť (5,058)
- Buková (91)
- Čenkov (129)
- Salavice (173)

== Geography ==
Třešť is located about 14 kilometres (9 mi) southwest of Jihlava. It lies in the Křižanov Highlands. The highest point is the Špičák hill at 734 m (2,408 ft) above sea level. The summit of Špičák with its surroundings is protected as the Velký Špičák National Nature Reserve with an area of 75.7 ha (187 acres). The stream Třešťský potok flows through the town. The municipal territory is rich in fishponds.

== History ==
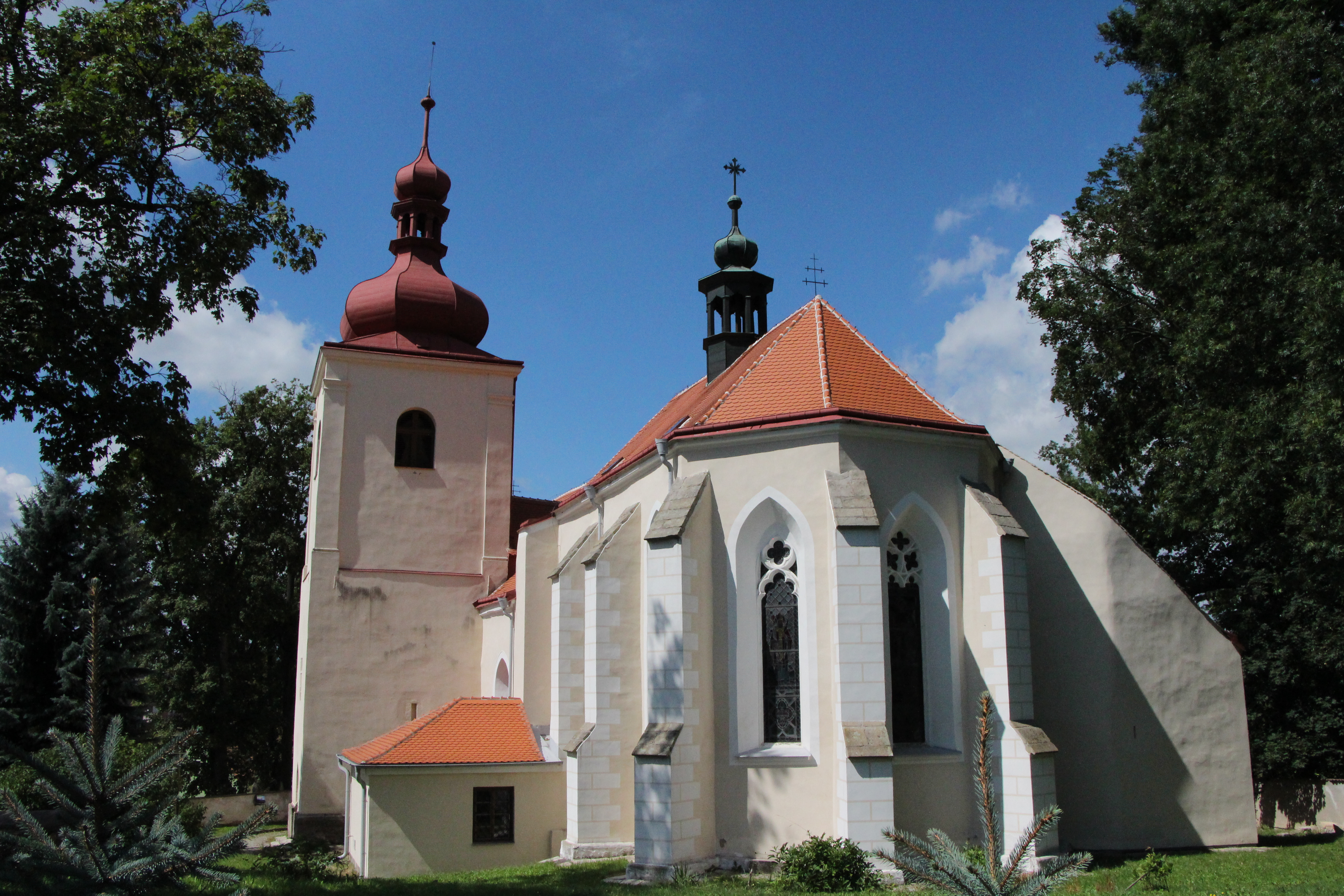
Church of Saint Martin

The first written mention is from 1349, when the Church of Saint Martin was documented. Třešť was originally a small parish village on the crossroads of two trade routes. Since its establishment, the Jewish community has been in Třešť.

Třešť was known for crafts and in the 19th century for its industry. The production of furniture and matches was established and textile and engineering industry flourished. The industrial boom was the work of Jewish entrepreneurs. The Jewish community declined in the first half of the 20th century, and disappeared as a result of the Holocaust.

Until 1901, Třešť was the largest market town in Moravia. In 1901, it was promoted to a town.

== Demographics ==
Historical population

Year	Pop.	±%
1869	4,634	—
1880	5,108	+10.2%
1890	5,520	+8.1%
1900	5,555	+0.6%
1910	5,858	+5.5%

Year	Pop.	±%
1921	5,628	−3.9%
1930	5,741	+2.0%
1950	5,219	−9.1%
1961	5,606	+7.4%
1970	5,578	−0.5%

Year	Pop.	±%
1980	5,805	+4.1%
1991	5,948	+2.5%
2001	5,933	−0.3%
2011	5,771	−2.7%
2021	5,451	−5.5%

Source: Censuses

== Economy ==
Since 1931, the textile company Vývoj has been operating in the town. Uniforms for the papal Swiss Guard are made by this company.

== Transport ==
Třešť lies on the railway line Havlíčkův Brod–Slavonice. The town is served by two train stations, Třešť and Třešť-město.

== Sights ==
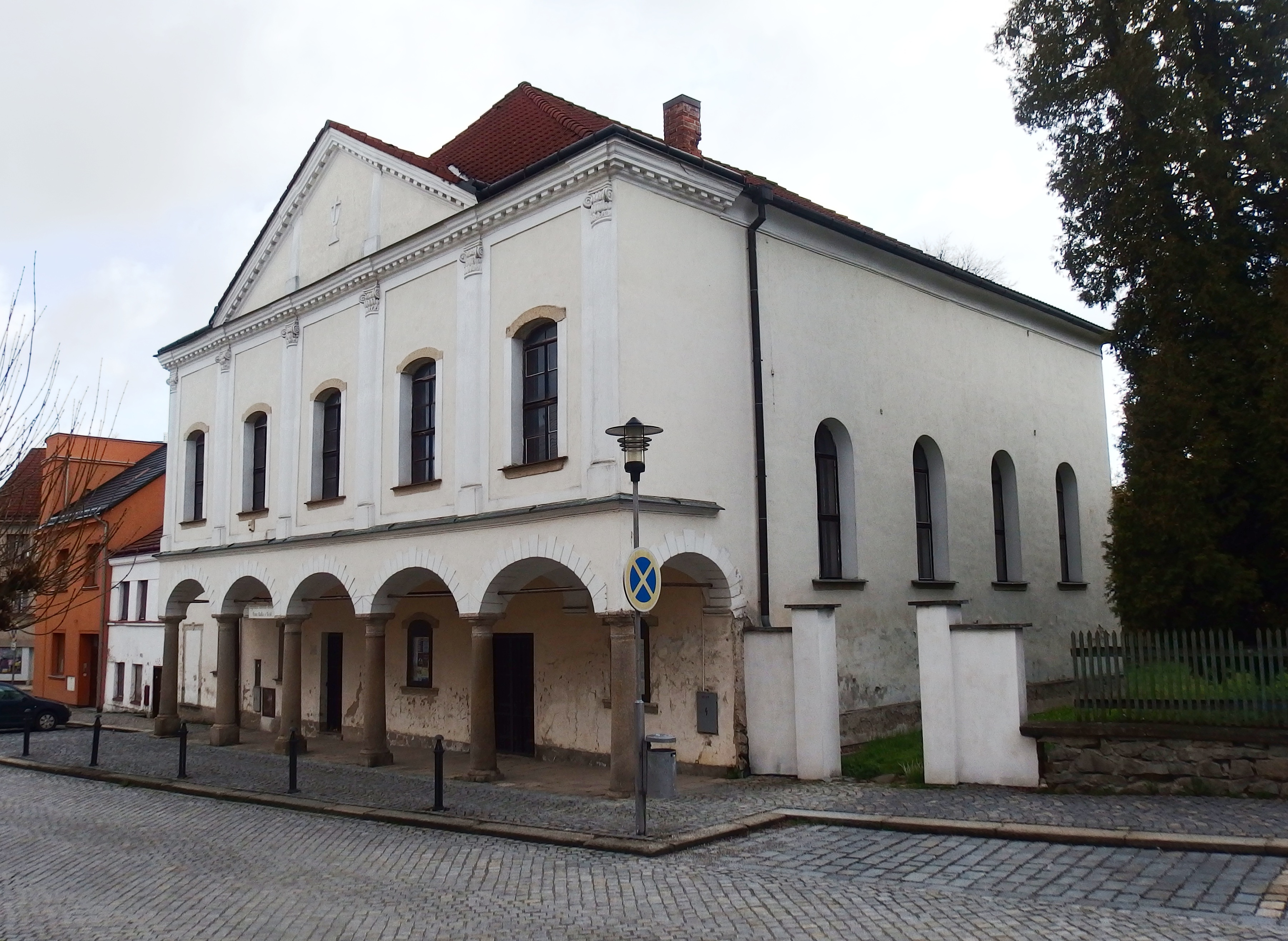
Former synagogue

The Church of Saint Martin was founded in the 13th century and is the oldest monument in the town. It has a Romanesque core, but its current appearance is a result of Baroque reconstructions in the second half of the 17th century.

The Church of Saint Catherine of Siena was founded in the 16th century, originally as a Lutheran church. It was built in the Renaissance style with Gothic elements and then rebuilt in the Baroque style in 1777. After it was damaged by fire, it was reconstructed in 1824–1842. The tower was finished in 1870.

Třešť Castle was created by reconstruction of a fortress from 1513. Originally a Renaissance residence, it was rebuilt in the Baroque style and then to its current Neo-Renaissance appearance in 1860. It has a large English style park. Nowadays it serves as a hotel.

The Jewish community is commemorated by the former synagogue, Jewish cemetery, and Monument to the Jewish Victims. The synagogue was built in the Empire style in 1824 and today most of the building houses an art gallery. The Jewish cemetery was founded in the second half of the 17th century, but most of the tombstones date from the 18th and 19th centuries. The oldest preserved readable tombstone dates from 1705, an there are more than 1,300 preserved tombstones.

== Notable people ==
- Josef Jiří Švec (1883–1918), military officer
- Joseph Schumpeter (1883–1950), Austrian political economist
- Jaroslav Rošický (1884–1942), military officer
- Otto Šimánek (1925–1992), actor
- František Radkovský (born 1939), Roman Catholic prelate

== Twin towns – sister cities ==
Třešť is twinned with:

- Obergünzburg, Germany

Třešť also has friendly relations with Raabs an der Thaya in Austria.
