= Vranov =

Vranov may refer to places:

== Czech Republic ==
- Vranov (Benešov District), a municipality and village in the Central Bohemian Region
- Vranov (Brno-Country District), a municipality and village in the South Moravian Region
- Vranov (Tachov District), a municipality and village in the Plzeň Region
- Vranov, a village and part of Ctětín in the Pardubice Region
- Vranov, a village and part of Dražíč in the South Bohemian Region
- Vranov, a village and part of Mimoň in the Liberec Region
- Vranov, a village and part of Mnichov (Domažlice District) in the Plzeň Region
- Vránov, a village and part of Staňkov (Domažlice District) in the Plzeň Region
- Vranov, a village and part of Votice in the Central Bohemian Region
- Vranov nad Dyjí, a market town in the South Moravian Region

== Slovakia ==
- Vranov nad Topľou, a town
