= Lom u Tachova =

- Municipality
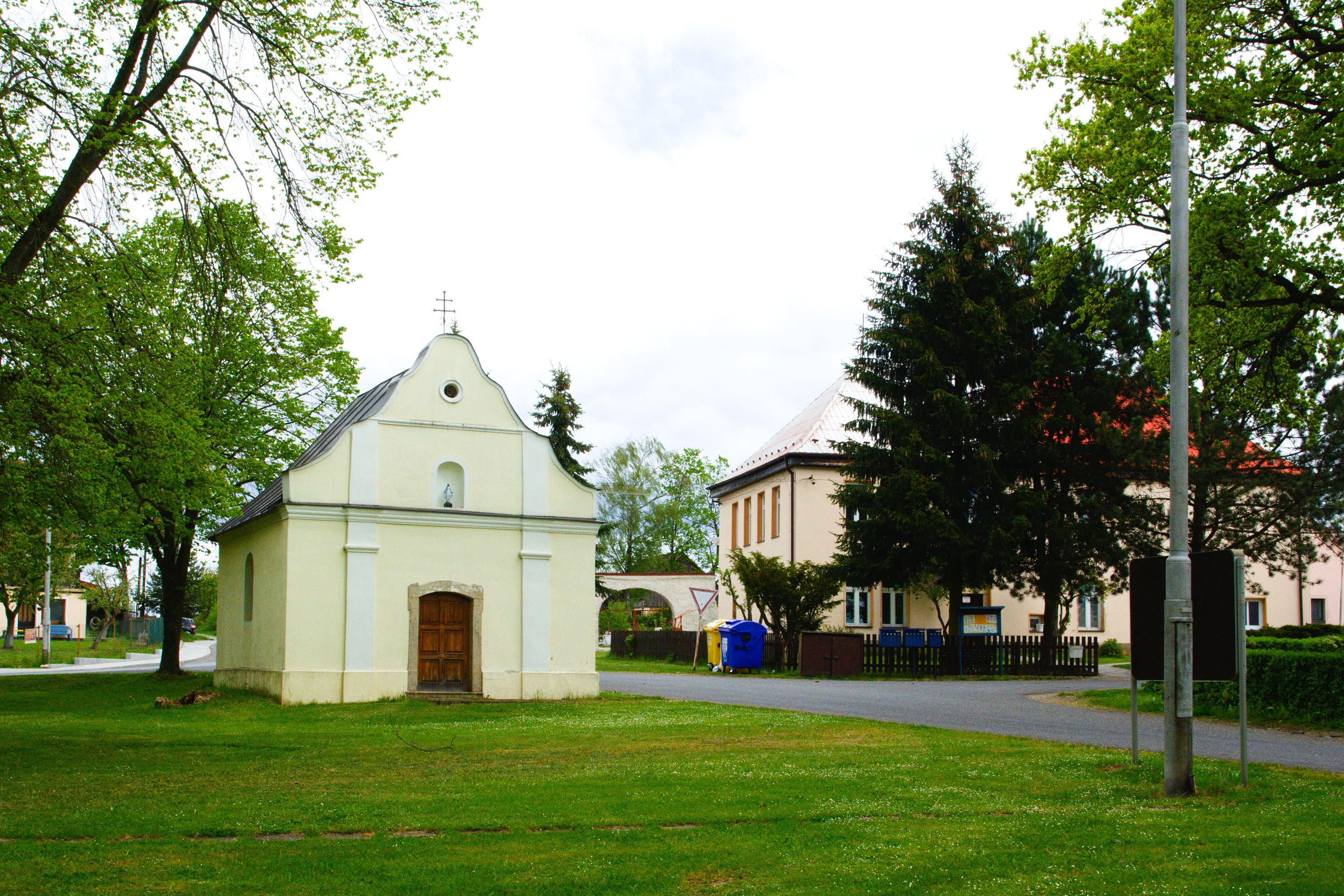
- Chapel of Our Lady Queen of Peace

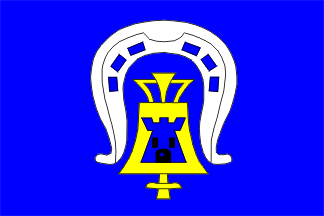
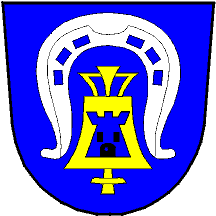
- Flag Coat of arms

- Location in the Czech Republic
- Coordinates: 49°49′8″N 12°41′34″E
- Country: Czech Republic
- Region: Plzeň
- District: Tachov
- First mentioned: 1379

Area
  - Total: 8.44 km^{2} (3.26 sq mi)
- Elevation: 500 m (1,600 ft)

Population (2026-01-01)
  - Total: 501
  - Density: 59.4/km^{2} (154/sq mi)
- Time zone: UTC+1 (CET)
  - Summer (DST): UTC+2 (CEST)
- Postal code: 347 01
- Website: www.lomutachova.cz

Lom u Tachova is a municipality and village in Tachov District in the Plzeň Region of the Czech Republic. It has about 500 inhabitants.

Lom u Tachova lies approximately 6 kilometres (4 mi) east of Tachov, 50 km (31 mi) west of Plzeň, and 128 km (80 mi) west of Prague.

== Demographics ==
Historical population
Year	Pop.	±%
1869	273	—
1880	263	−3.7%
1890	244	−7.2%
1900	303	+24.2%
1910	290	−4.3%
1921	300	+3.4%
1930	266	−11.3%
1950	128	−51.9%
1961	124	−3.1%
1970	346	+179.0%
1980	332	−4.0%
1991	313	−5.7%
2001	399	+27.5%
2011	400	+0.3%
2021	477	+19.2%
Source: Censuses
