= Zhoř (Tachov District) =

- Municipality
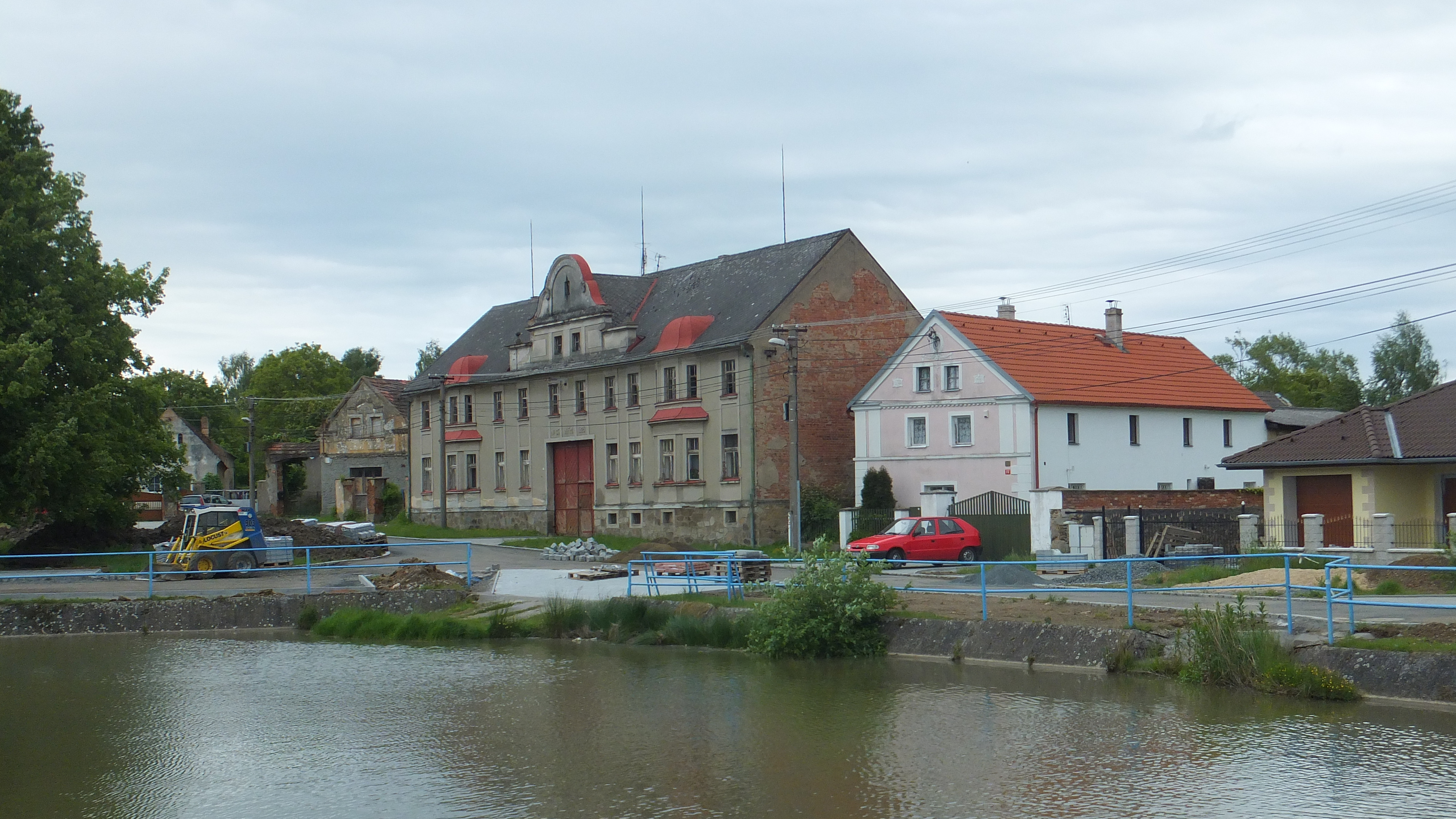
- Centre of Zhoř

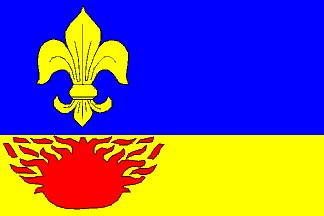
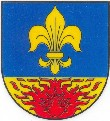
- Flag Coat of arms

- Location in the Czech Republic
- Coordinates: 49°39′36″N 12°58′11″E
- Country: Czech Republic
- Region: Plzeň
- District: Tachov
- First mentioned: 1239

Area
  - Total: 10.56 km^{2} (4.08 sq mi)
- Elevation: 502 m (1,647 ft)

Population (2026-01-01)
  - Total: 176
  - Density: 16.7/km^{2} (43.2/sq mi)
- Time zone: UTC+1 (CET)
  - Summer (DST): UTC+2 (CEST)
- Postal code: 349 01
- Website: www.zhorutachova.cz

Zhoř is a municipality and village in Tachov District in the Plzeň Region of the Czech Republic. It has about 200 inhabitants.

Zhoř lies approximately 30 kilometres (19 mi) south-east of Tachov, 31 km (19 mi) west of Plzeň, and 115 km (71 mi) south-west of Prague.

== Demographics ==
Historical population
Year	Pop.	±%
1869	289	—
1880	302	+4.5%
1890	293	−3.0%
1900	295	+0.7%
1910	334	+13.2%
1921	362	+8.4%
1930	299	−17.4%
1950	177	−40.8%
1961	126	−28.8%
1970	131	+4.0%
1980	124	−5.3%
1991	145	+16.9%
2001	154	+6.2%
2011	121	−21.4%
2021	141	+16.5%
Source: Censuses
