= Sulislav =

- Municipality
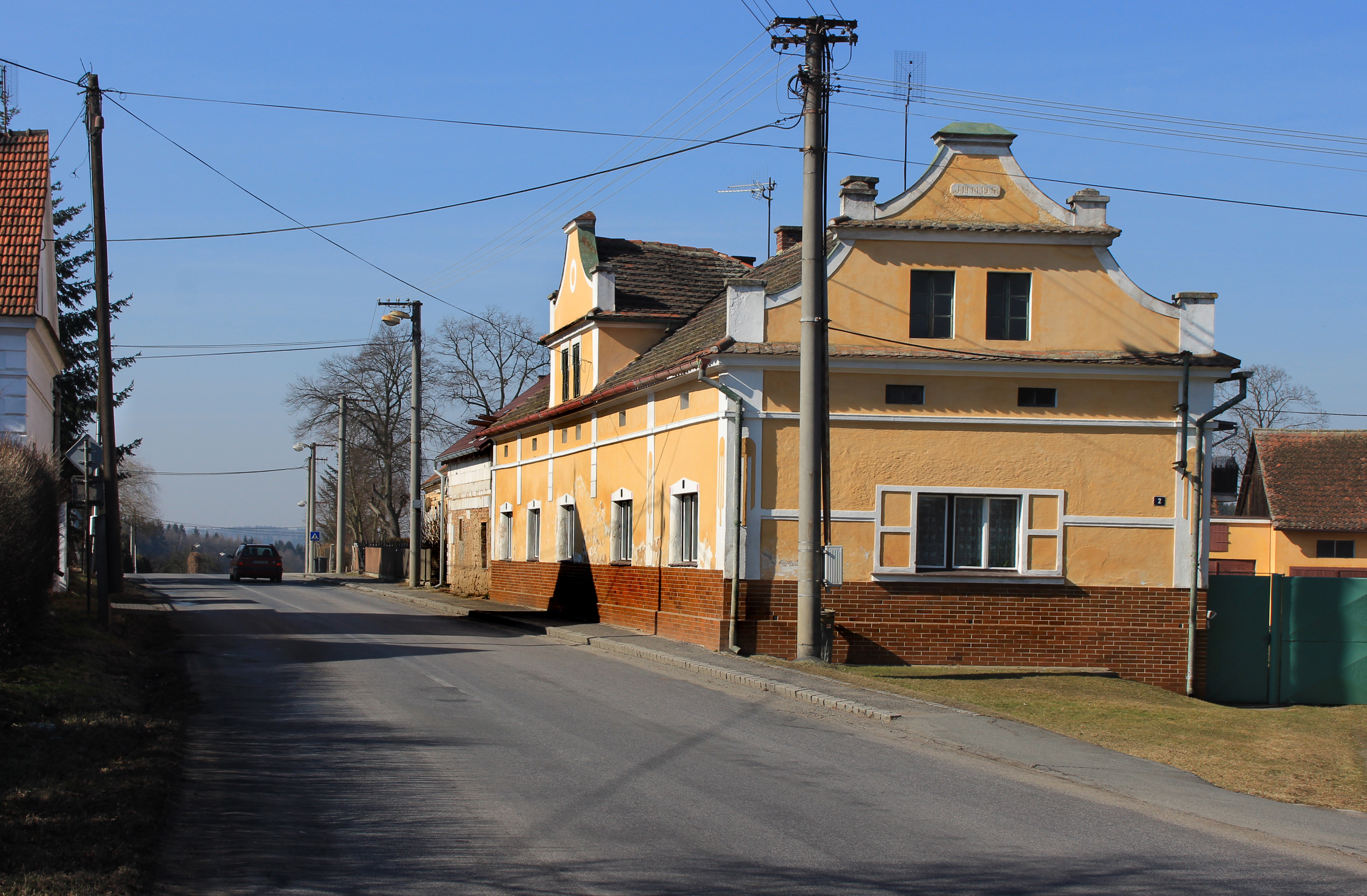
- Main road

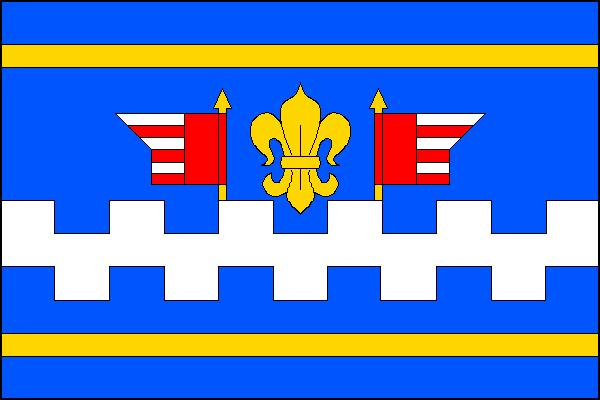
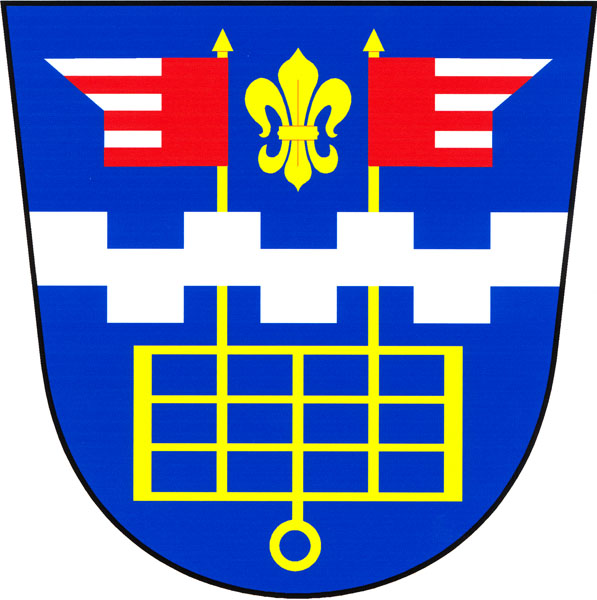
- Flag Coat of arms

- Location in the Czech Republic
- Coordinates: 49°44′55″N 13°4′22″E
- Country: Czech Republic
- Region: Plzeň
- District: Tachov
- First mentioned: 1193

Area
  - Total: 9.58 km^{2} (3.70 sq mi)
- Elevation: 458 m (1,503 ft)

Population (2026-01-01)
  - Total: 231
  - Density: 24.1/km^{2} (62.5/sq mi)
- Time zone: UTC+1 (CET)
  - Summer (DST): UTC+2 (CEST)
- Postal code: 349 74
- Website: www.sulislav.cz

Sulislav is a municipality and village in Tachov District in the Plzeň Region of the Czech Republic. It has about 200 inhabitants.

Sulislav lies approximately 34 kilometres (21 mi) east of Tachov, 22 km (14 mi) west of Plzeň, and 104 km (65 mi) west of Prague.

== Demographics ==
Historical population
Year	Pop.	±%
1869	324	—
1880	303	−6.5%
1890	297	−2.0%
1900	301	+1.3%
1910	285	−5.3%
1921	282	−1.1%
1930	335	+18.8%
1950	200	−40.3%
1961	225	+12.5%
1970	194	−13.8%
1980	206	+6.2%
1991	188	−8.7%
2001	185	−1.6%
2011	215	+16.2%
2021	214	−0.5%
Source: Censuses
