= Cebiv =

- Municipality
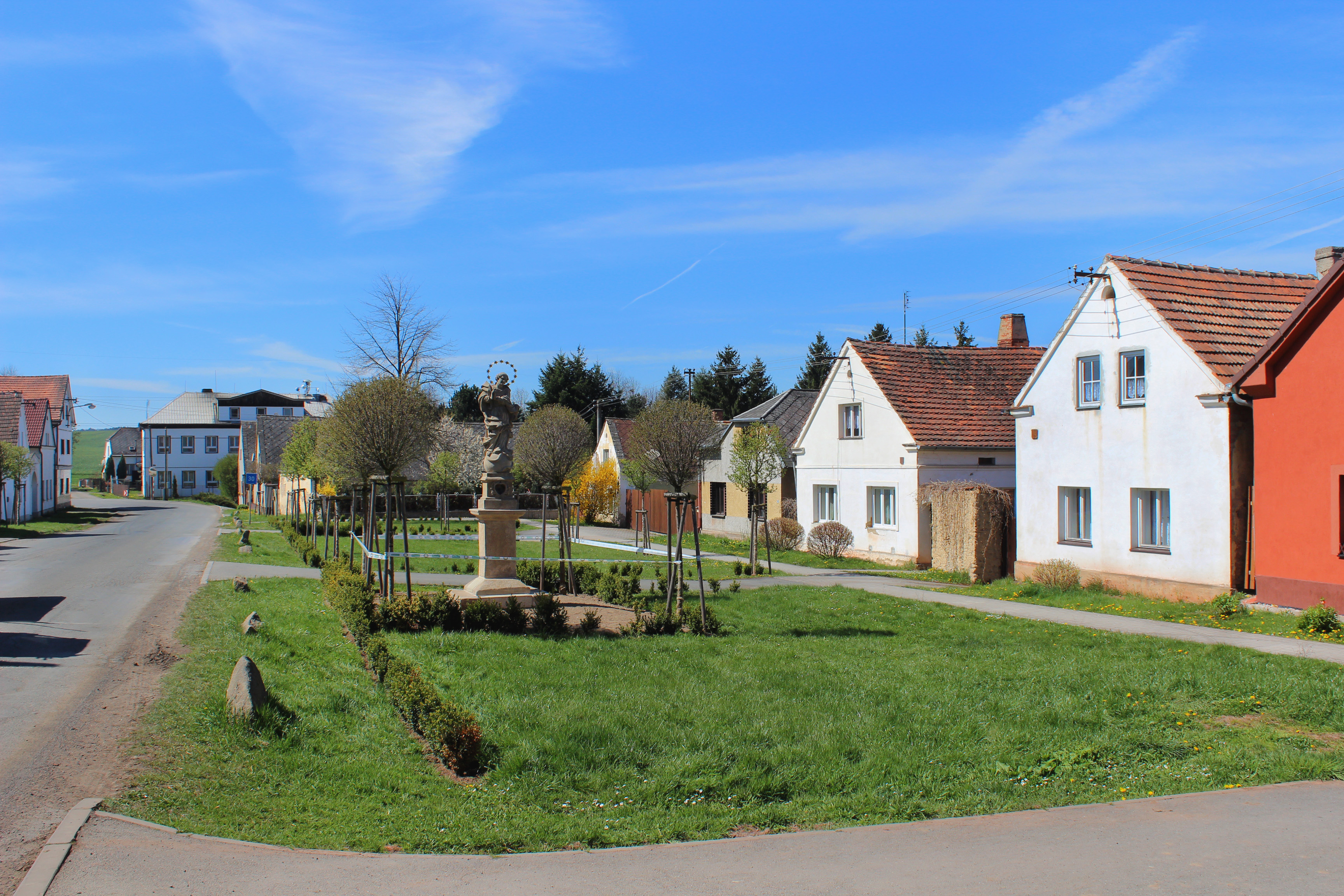
- Upper common

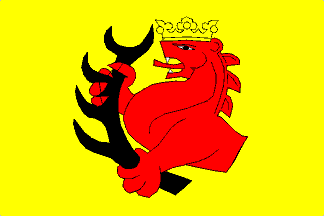
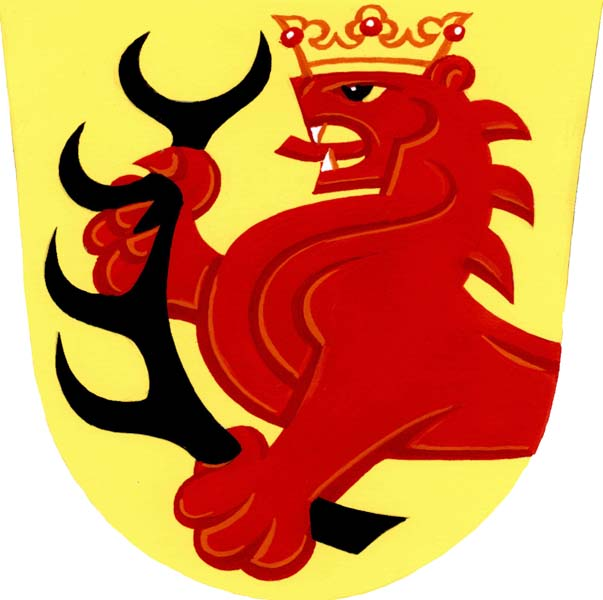
- Flag Coat of arms

- Location in the Czech Republic
- Coordinates: 49°49′46″N 12°58′45″E
- Country: Czech Republic
- Region: Plzeň
- District: Tachov
- First mentioned: 1115

Area
  - Total: 10.61 km^{2} (4.10 sq mi)
- Elevation: 471 m (1,545 ft)

Population (2026-01-01)
  - Total: 262
  - Density: 24.7/km^{2} (64.0/sq mi)
- Time zone: UTC+1 (CET)
  - Summer (DST): UTC+2 (CEST)
- Postal code: 349 52
- Website: www.cebiv.cz

Cebiv is a municipality and village in Tachov District in the Plzeň Region of the Czech Republic. It has about 300 inhabitants.

Cebiv lies approximately 27 kilometres (17 mi) east of Tachov, 30 km (19 mi) west of Plzeň, and 108 km (67 mi) west of Prague.

== Administrative division ==
Cebiv consists of two municipal parts (in brackets population according to the 2021 census):

- Cebiv (212)
- Bezemín (15)

== Demographics ==
Historical population
Year	Pop.	±%
1869	497	—
1880	545	+9.7%
1890	553	+1.5%
1900	554	+0.2%
1910	570	+2.9%
1921	596	+4.6%
1930	585	−1.8%
1950	276	−52.8%
1961	332	+20.3%
1970	299	−9.9%
1980	236	−21.1%
1991	272	+15.3%
2001	288	+5.9%
2011	239	−17.0%
2021	227	−5.0%
Source: Censuses
