= Studánka =

- Municipality
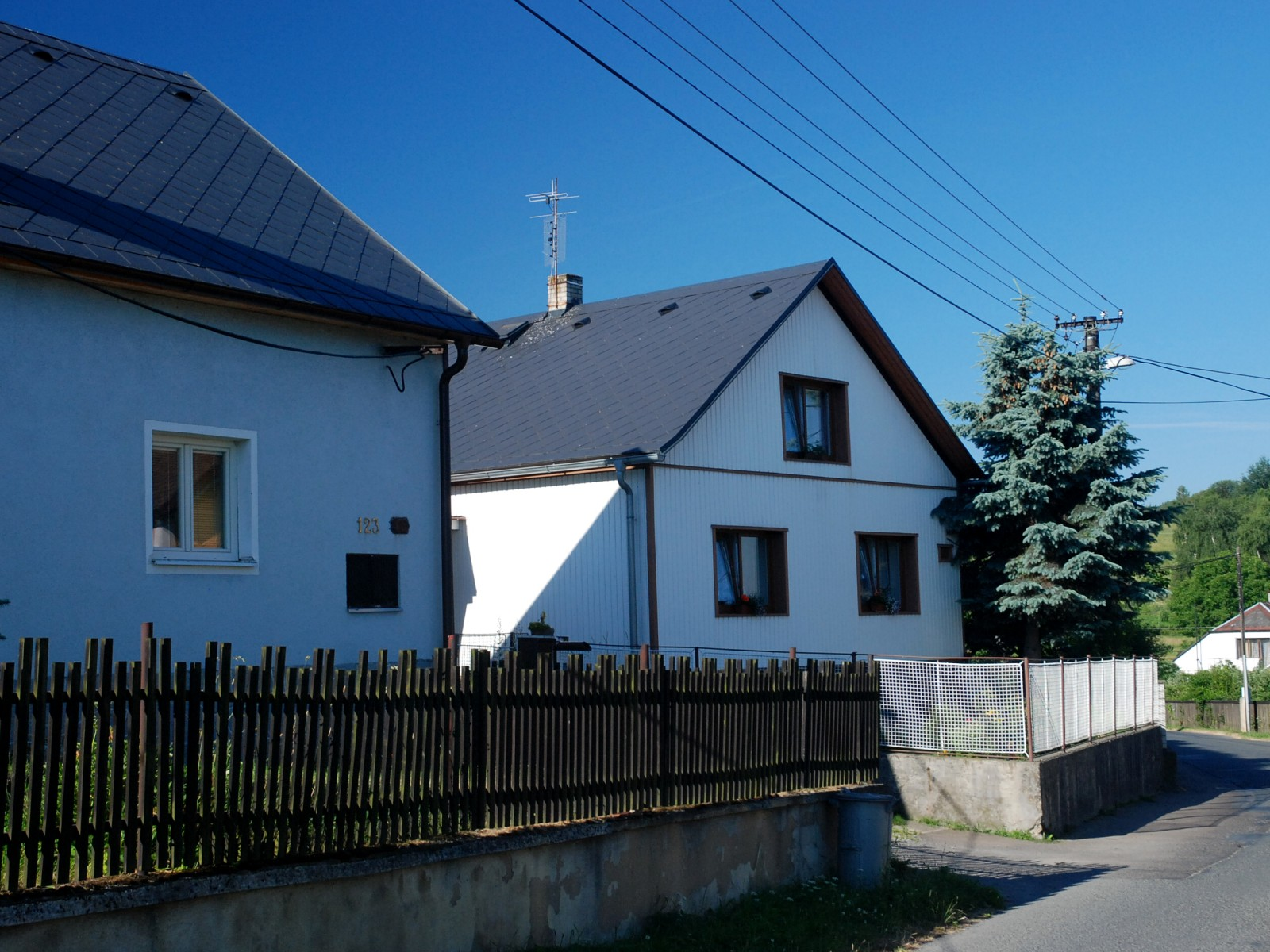
- Houses in Studánka

- Flag Coat of arms

- Location in the Czech Republic
- Coordinates: 49°46′50″N 12°36′13″E
- Country: Czech Republic
- Region: Plzeň
- District: Tachov
- First mentioned: 1407

Area
  - Total: 7.11 km^{2} (2.75 sq mi)
- Elevation: 611 m (2,005 ft)

Population (2026-01-01)
  - Total: 583
  - Density: 82.0/km^{2} (212/sq mi)
- Time zone: UTC+1 (CET)
  - Summer (DST): UTC+2 (CEST)
- Postal code: 347 01
- Website: www.studanka.eu

Studánka (German: Schönbrunn) is a municipality and village in Tachov District in the Plzeň Region of the Czech Republic. It has about 600 inhabitants.

Studánka lies approximately 4 kilometres (2 mi) south-west of Tachov, 57 km (35 mi) west of Plzeň, and 136 km (85 mi) west of Prague.

== Demographics ==
Historical population
Year	Pop.	±%
1869	862	—
1880	705	−18.2%
1890	683	−3.1%
1900	742	+8.6%
1910	819	+10.4%
1921	812	−0.9%
1930	828	+2.0%
1950	286	−65.5%
1961	265	−7.3%
1970	328	+23.8%
1980	342	+4.3%
1991	357	+4.4%
2001	387	+8.4%
2011	462	+19.4%
2021	504	+9.1%
Source: Censuses
