= Brod nad Tichou =

- Municipality
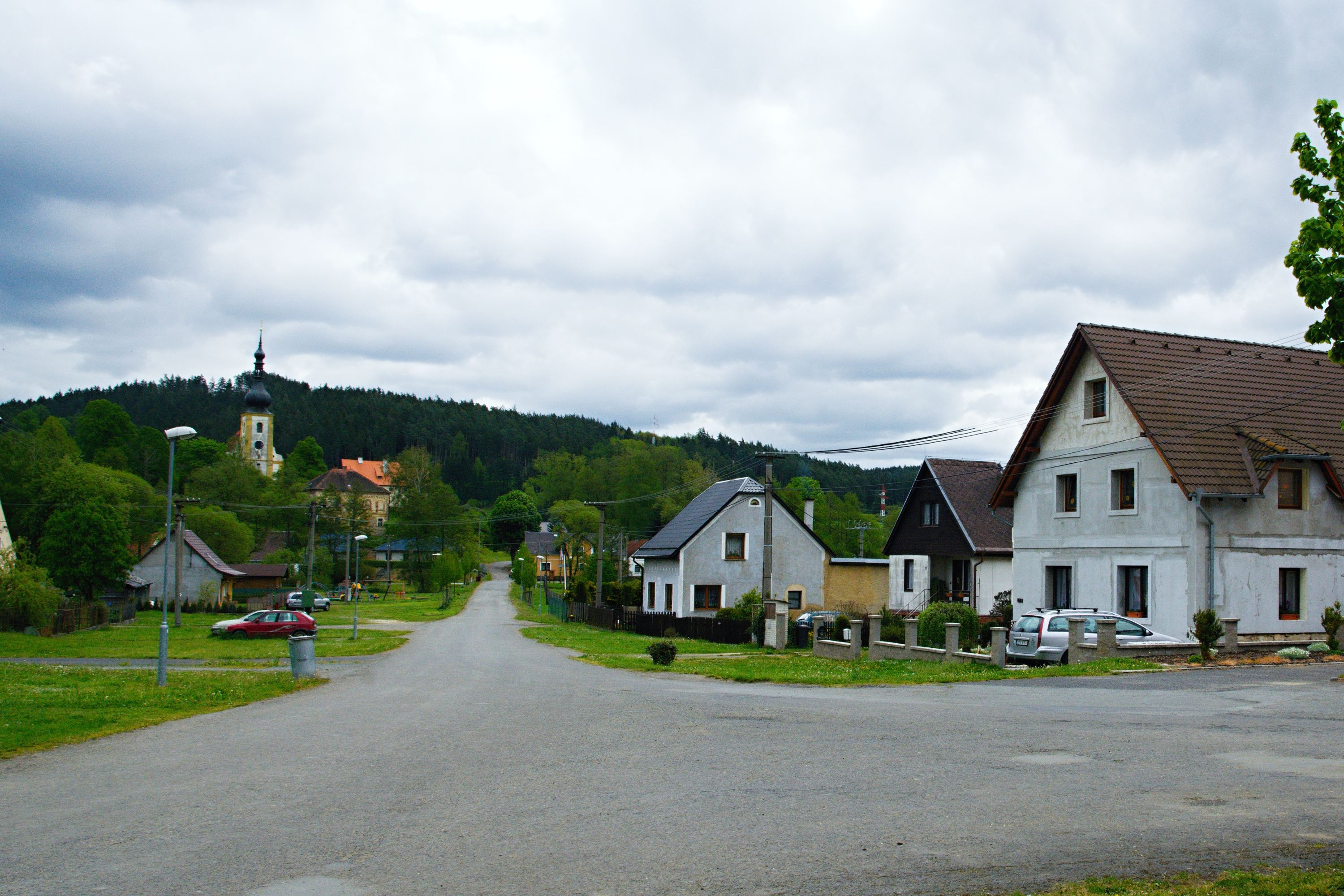
- Centre of Brod nad Tichou

- Flag Coat of arms

- Location in the Czech Republic
- Coordinates: 49°50′7″N 12°44′28″E
- Country: Czech Republic
- Region: Plzeň
- District: Tachov
- First mentioned: 1243

Area
  - Total: 9.82 km^{2} (3.79 sq mi)
- Elevation: 468 m (1,535 ft)

Population (2026-01-01)
  - Total: 254
  - Density: 25.9/km^{2} (67.0/sq mi)
- Time zone: UTC+1 (CET)
  - Summer (DST): UTC+2 (CEST)
- Postal code: 348 15
- Website: www.brodnadtichou.cz

Brod nad Tichou (German: Bruck am Hammer) is a municipality and village in Tachov District in the Plzeň Region of the Czech Republic. It has about 300 inhabitants.

Brod nad Tichou lies approximately 10 kilometres (6 mi) north-east of Tachov, 48 km (30 mi) west of Plzeň, and 125 km (78 mi) west of Prague.

== Demographics ==
Historical population
Year	Pop.	±%
1869	419	—
1880	440	+5.0%
1890	430	−2.3%
1900	455	+5.8%
1910	435	−4.4%
1921	445	+2.3%
1930	480	+7.9%
1950	265	−44.8%
1961	263	−0.8%
1970	246	−6.5%
1980	250	+1.6%
1991	223	−10.8%
2001	239	+7.2%
2011	234	−2.1%
2021	225	−3.8%
Source: Censuses
