= Sytno =

- Municipality
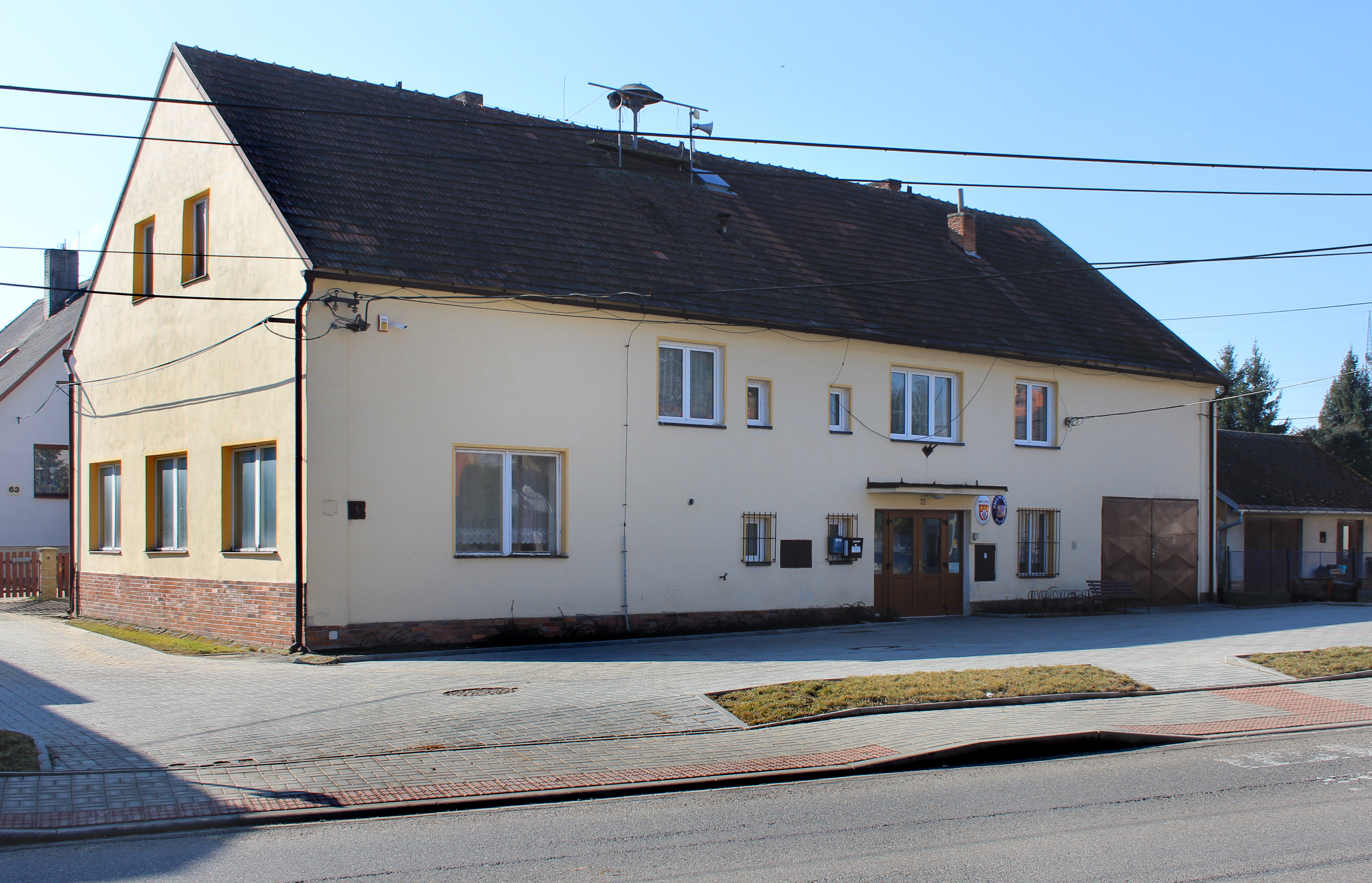
- Municipal office

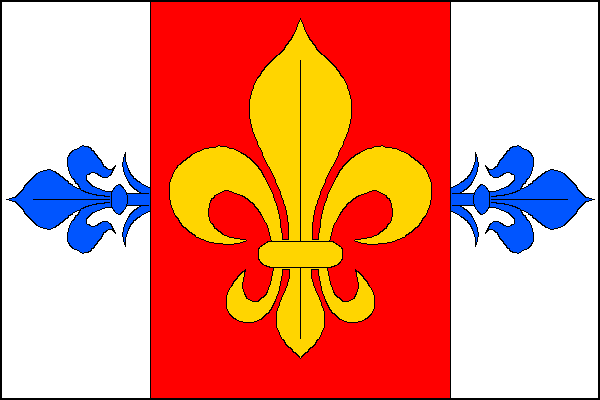
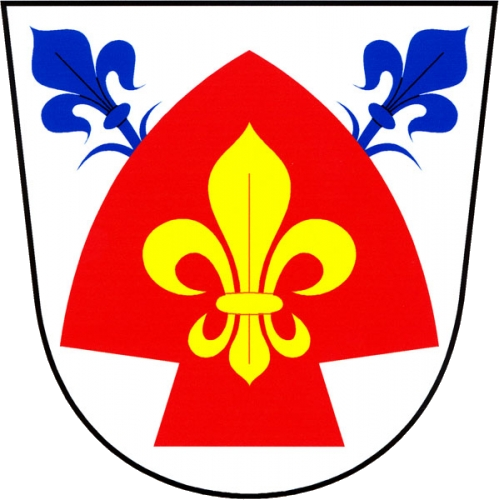
- Flag Coat of arms

- Location in the Czech Republic
- Coordinates: 49°44′23″N 13°2′30″E
- Country: Czech Republic
- Region: Plzeň
- District: Tachov
- First mentioned: 1115

Area
  - Total: 5.14 km^{2} (1.98 sq mi)
- Elevation: 418 m (1,371 ft)

Population (2026-01-01)
  - Total: 296
  - Density: 57.6/km^{2} (149/sq mi)
- Time zone: UTC+1 (CET)
  - Summer (DST): UTC+2 (CEST)
- Postal code: 349 01
- Website: www.obec-sytno.cz

Sytno is a municipality and village in Tachov District in the Plzeň Region of the Czech Republic. It has about 300 inhabitants.

Sytno lies approximately 32 kilometres (20 mi) east of Tachov, 24 km (15 mi) west of Plzeň, and 107 km (66 mi) west of Prague.

== Demographics ==
Historical population
Year	Pop.	±%
1869	207	—
1880	228	+10.1%
1890	220	−3.5%
1900	231	+5.0%
1910	229	−0.9%
1921	200	−12.7%
1930	234	+17.0%
1950	142	−39.3%
1961	134	−5.6%
1970	268	+100.0%
1980	254	−5.2%
1991	266	+4.7%
2001	305	+14.7%
2011	326	+6.9%
2021	254	−22.1%
Source: Censuses
