= Obora (Tachov District) =

- Municipality
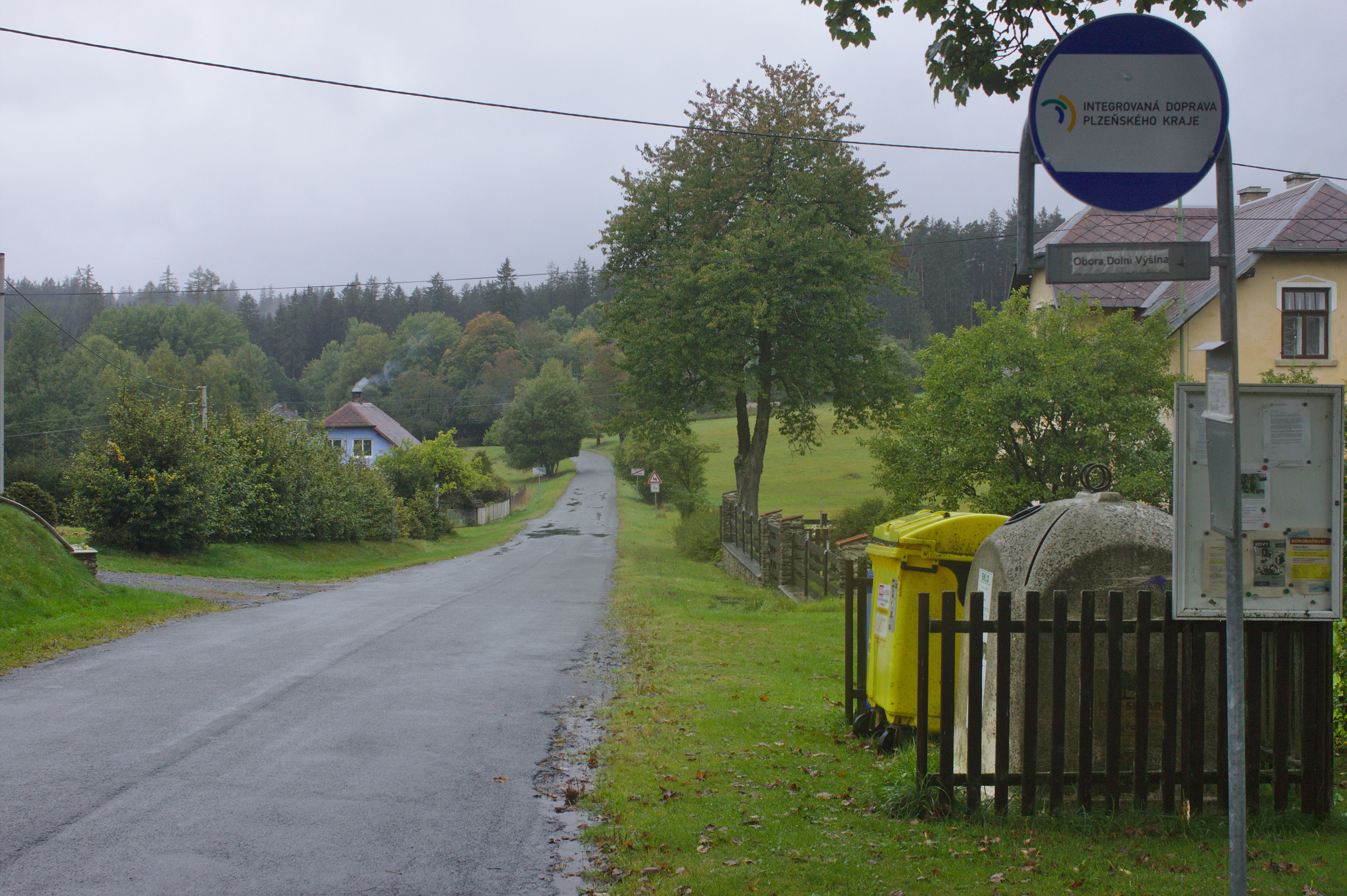
- Dolní Výšina, a part of Obora

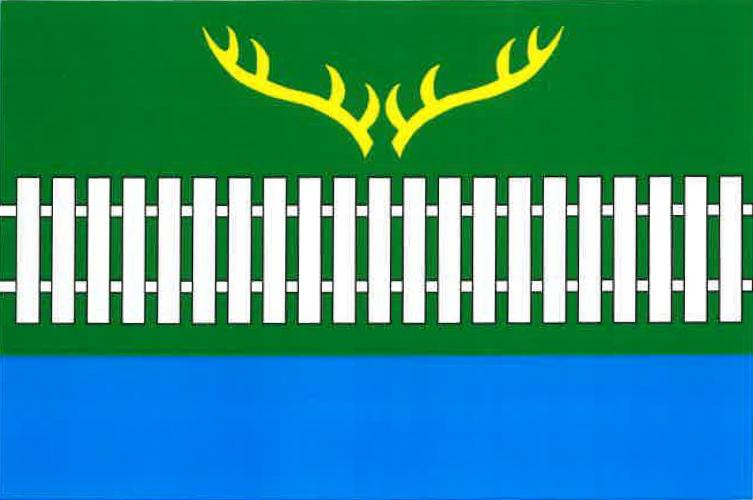
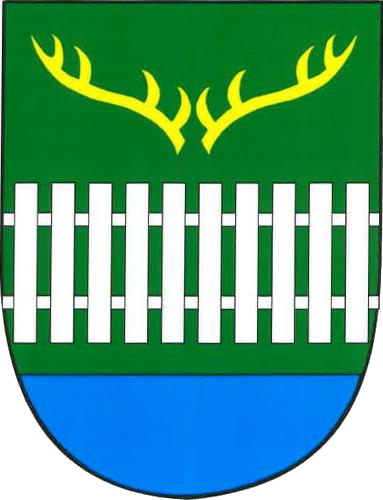
- Flag Coat of arms

- Location in the Czech Republic
- Coordinates: 49°48′53″N 12°32′16″E
- Country: Czech Republic
- Region: Plzeň
- District: Tachov
- First mentioned: 1660

Area
  - Total: 16.14 km^{2} (6.23 sq mi)
- Elevation: 620 m (2,030 ft)

Population (2026-01-01)
  - Total: 180
  - Density: 11/km^{2} (29/sq mi)
- Time zone: UTC+1 (CET)
  - Summer (DST): UTC+2 (CEST)
- Postal code: 347 01
- Website: www.obec-obora.cz

Obora (German: Thiergarten) is a municipality and village in Tachov District in the Plzeň Region of the Czech Republic. It has about 200 inhabitants.

Obora lies approximately 9 kilometres (6 mi) west of Tachov, 64 km (40 mi) west of Plzeň, and 142 km (88 mi) west of Prague.

== Administrative division ==
Obora consists of two municipal parts (in brackets population according to the 2021 census):

- Obora (139)
- Dolní Výšina (19)

== Demographics ==
Historical population
Year	Pop.	±%
1869	1,962	—
1880	1,528	−22.1%
1890	1,503	−1.6%
1900	1,609	+7.1%
1910	1,570	−2.4%
1921	1,526	−2.8%
1930	1,601	+4.9%
1950	375	−76.6%
1961	205	−45.3%
1970	187	−8.8%
1980	124	−33.7%
1991	98	−21.0%
2001	104	+6.1%
2011	106	+1.9%
2021	158	+49.1%
Source: Censuses
