= Milíře =

- Municipality
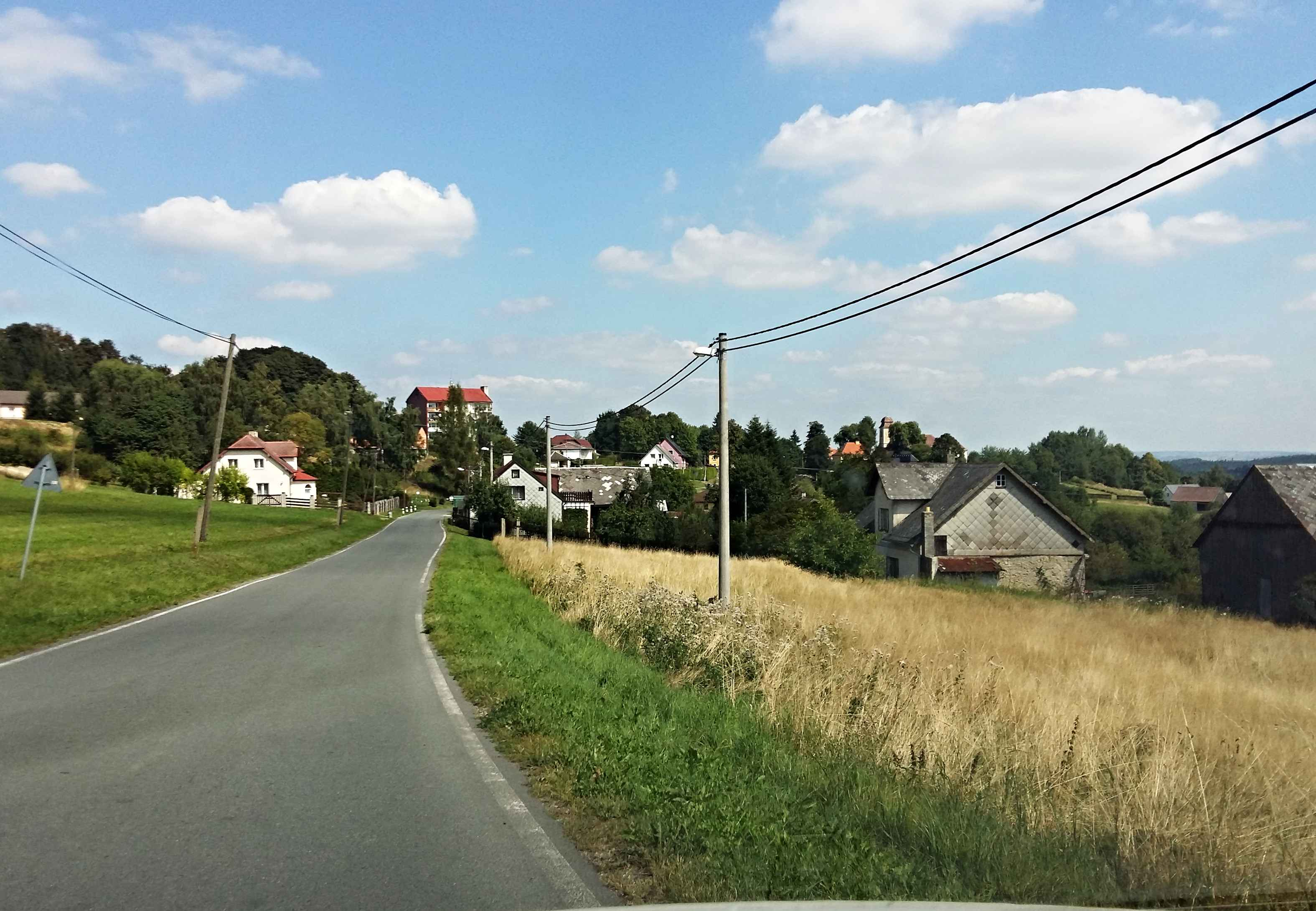
- General view

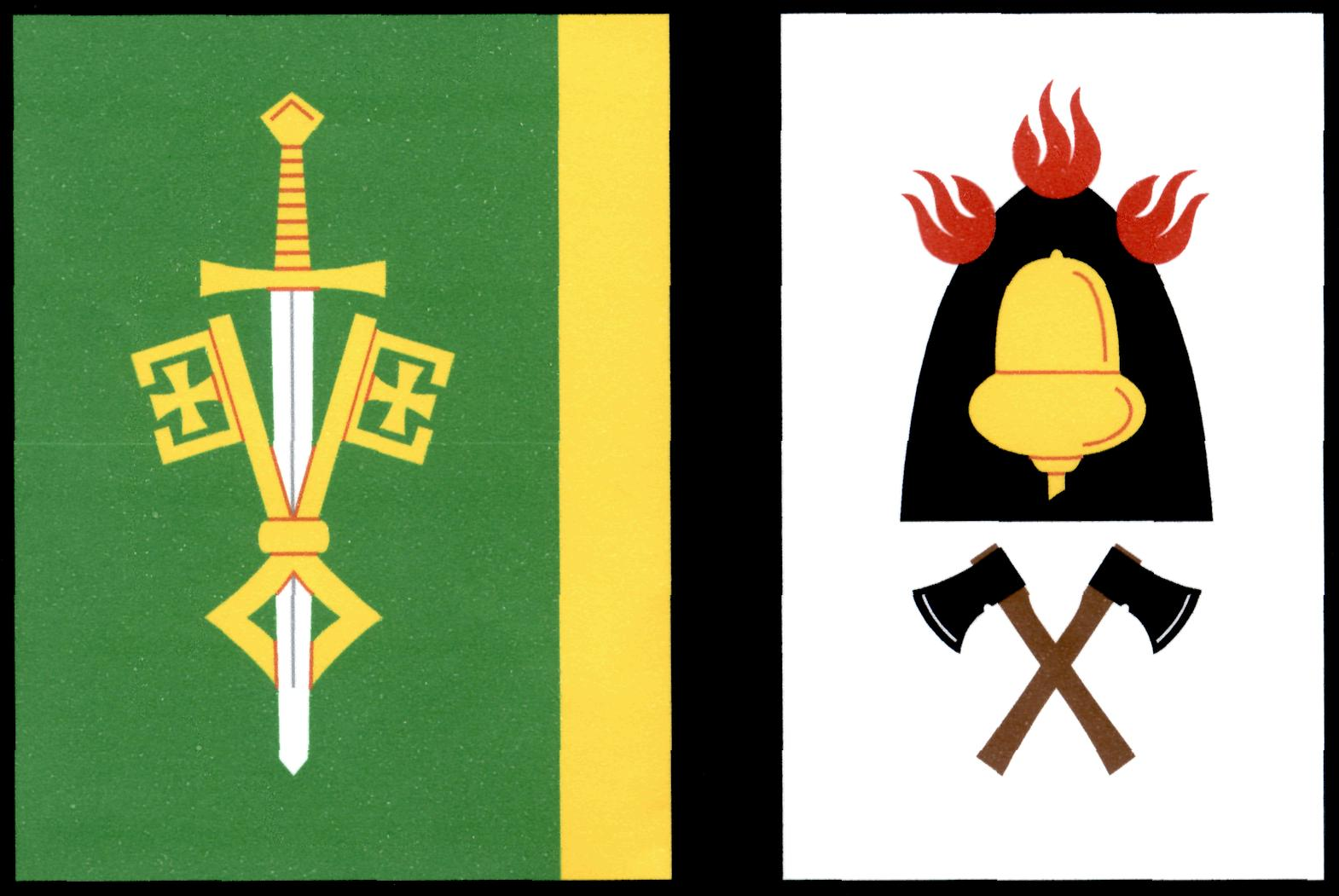
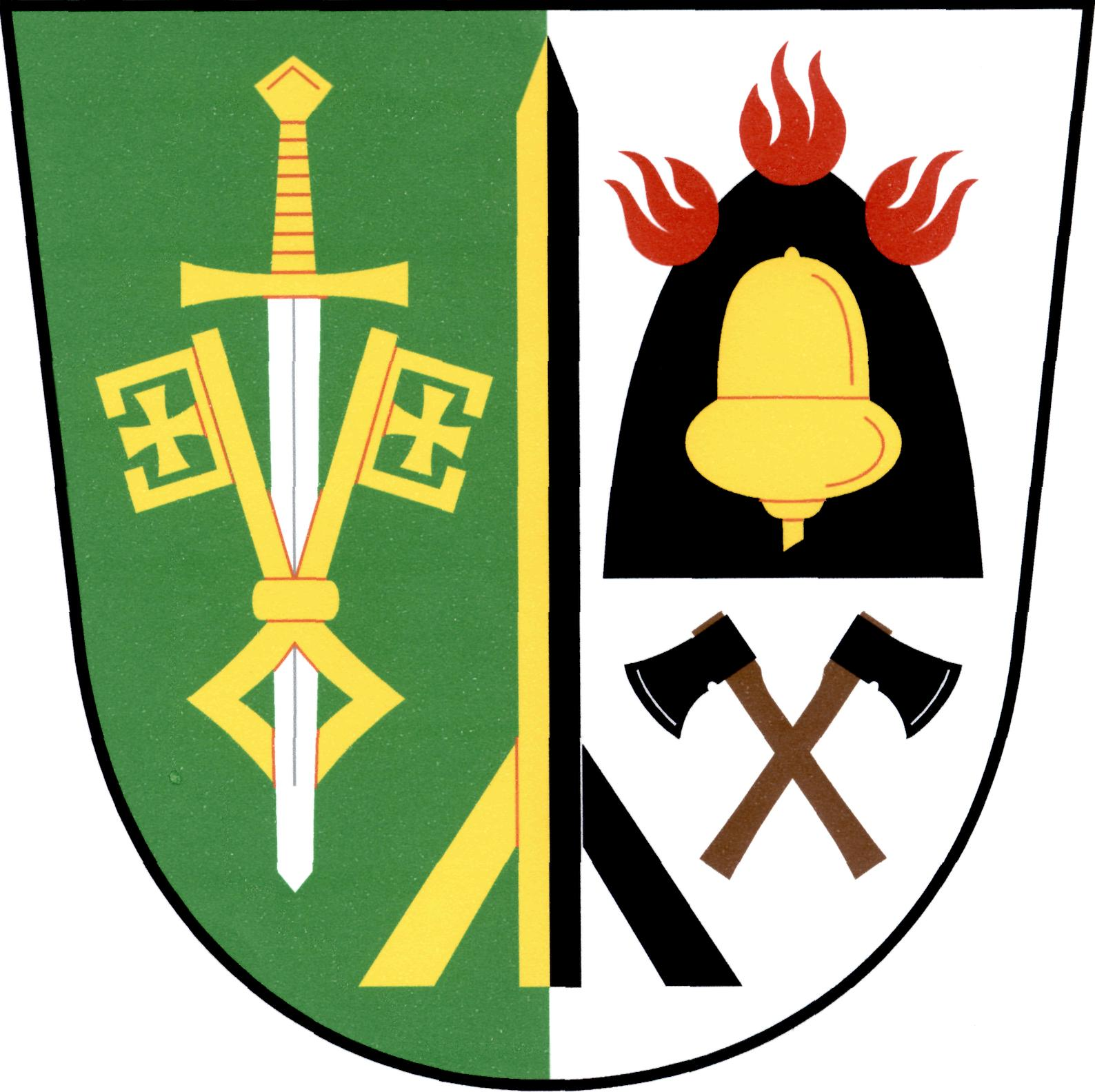
- Flag Coat of arms

- Location in the Czech Republic
- Coordinates: 49°47′47″N 12°33′2″E
- Country: Czech Republic
- Region: Plzeň
- District: Tachov
- First mentioned: 1669

Area
  - Total: 14.89 km^{2} (5.75 sq mi)
- Elevation: 635 m (2,083 ft)

Population (2026-01-01)
  - Total: 227
  - Density: 15.2/km^{2} (39.5/sq mi)
- Time zone: UTC+1 (CET)
  - Summer (DST): UTC+2 (CEST)
- Postal code: 347 01
- Website: www.obec-milire.cz

Milíře (German: Brand, Tachauer Brand) is a municipality and village in Tachov District in the Plzeň Region of the Czech Republic. It has about 200 inhabitants.

== Administrative division ==
Milíře consists of two municipal parts (in brackets population according to the 2021 census):

- Milíře (206)
- Zadní Milíře (44)

== Etymology ==
The name literally means 'charcoal piles' in Czech.

== Geography ==
Milíře is located about 6 kilometres (4 mi) west of Tachov and 58 km (36 mi) west of Plzeň, near the border with Germany. It lies in the Upper Palatinate Forest. The highest point is at 750 m (2,461 ft) above sea level.

== History ==
The first written mention of Milíře is from 1669. Zadní Milíře was first mentioned in 1778.

In 1946, most of the German-speaking inhabitants were expelled. After the war, the area was only partly repopulated.

== Demographics ==
Historical population

| Year | Pop. | ±% |
|---|---|---|
| 1869 | 1,859 | — |
| 1880 | 1,814 | −2.4% |
| 1890 | 1,843 | +1.6% |
| 1900 | 1,852 | +0.5% |
| 1910 | 1,910 | +3.1% |

| Year | Pop. | ±% |
|---|---|---|
| 1921 | 1,825 | −4.5% |
| 1930 | 1,720 | −5.8% |
| 1950 | 328 | −80.9% |
| 1961 | 448 | +36.6% |
| 1970 | 359 | −19.9% |

| Year | Pop. | ±% |
|---|---|---|
| 1980 | 93 | −74.1% |
| 1991 | 81 | −12.9% |
| 2001 | 198 | +144.4% |
| 2011 | 235 | +18.7% |
| 2021 | 250 | +6.4% |

Source: Censuses

== Transport ==
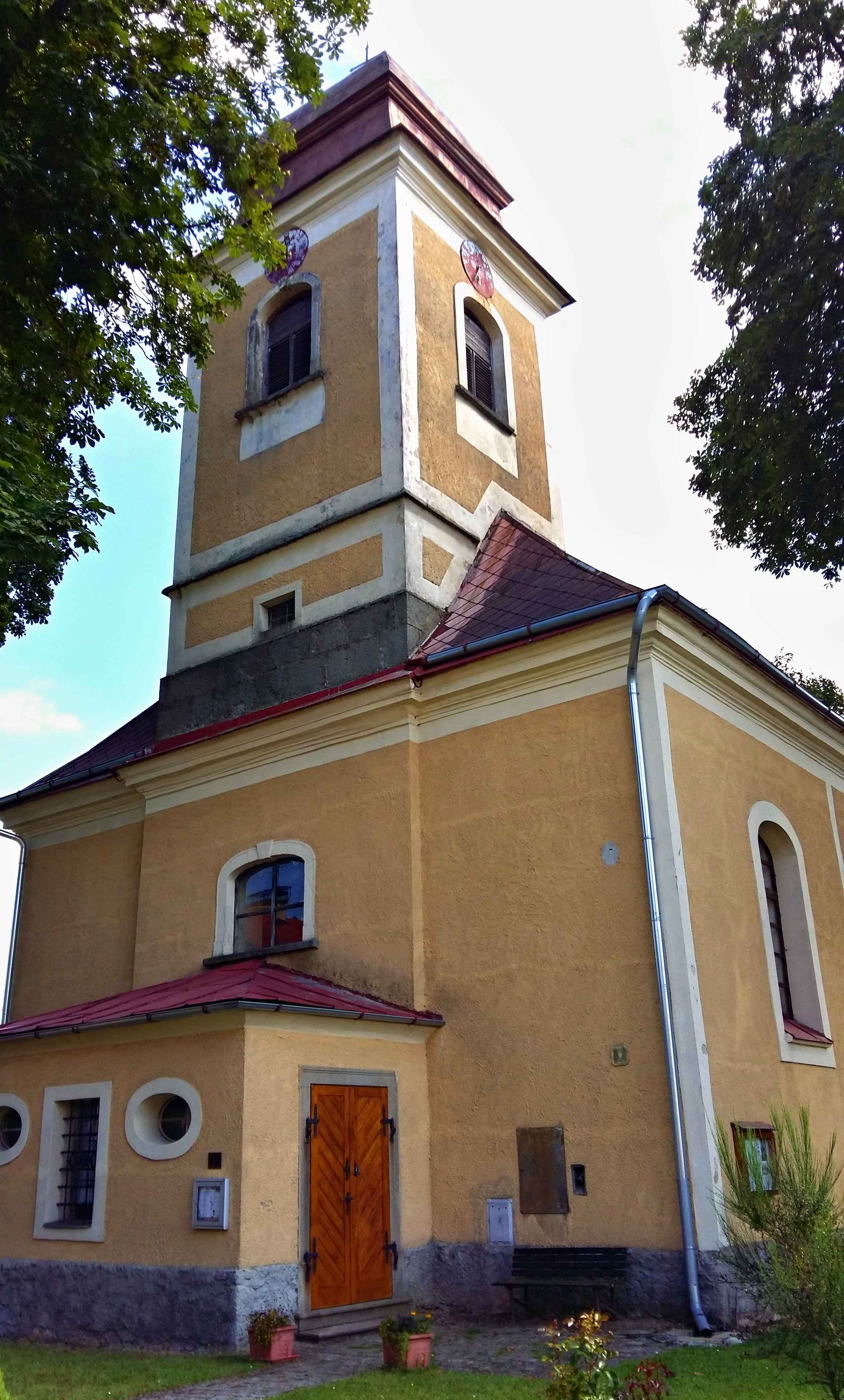
Church of Saints Peter and Paul

There are no railways or major roads passing through the municipality.

== Sights ==
The main landmark of Milíře is the Church of Saints Peter and Paul. It was built in the Neoclassical style in 1814–1816. Together with the rectory, school, memorial cross and World War I memorial, it forms a valuable set of historical buildings.
