= Únehle =

- Municipality
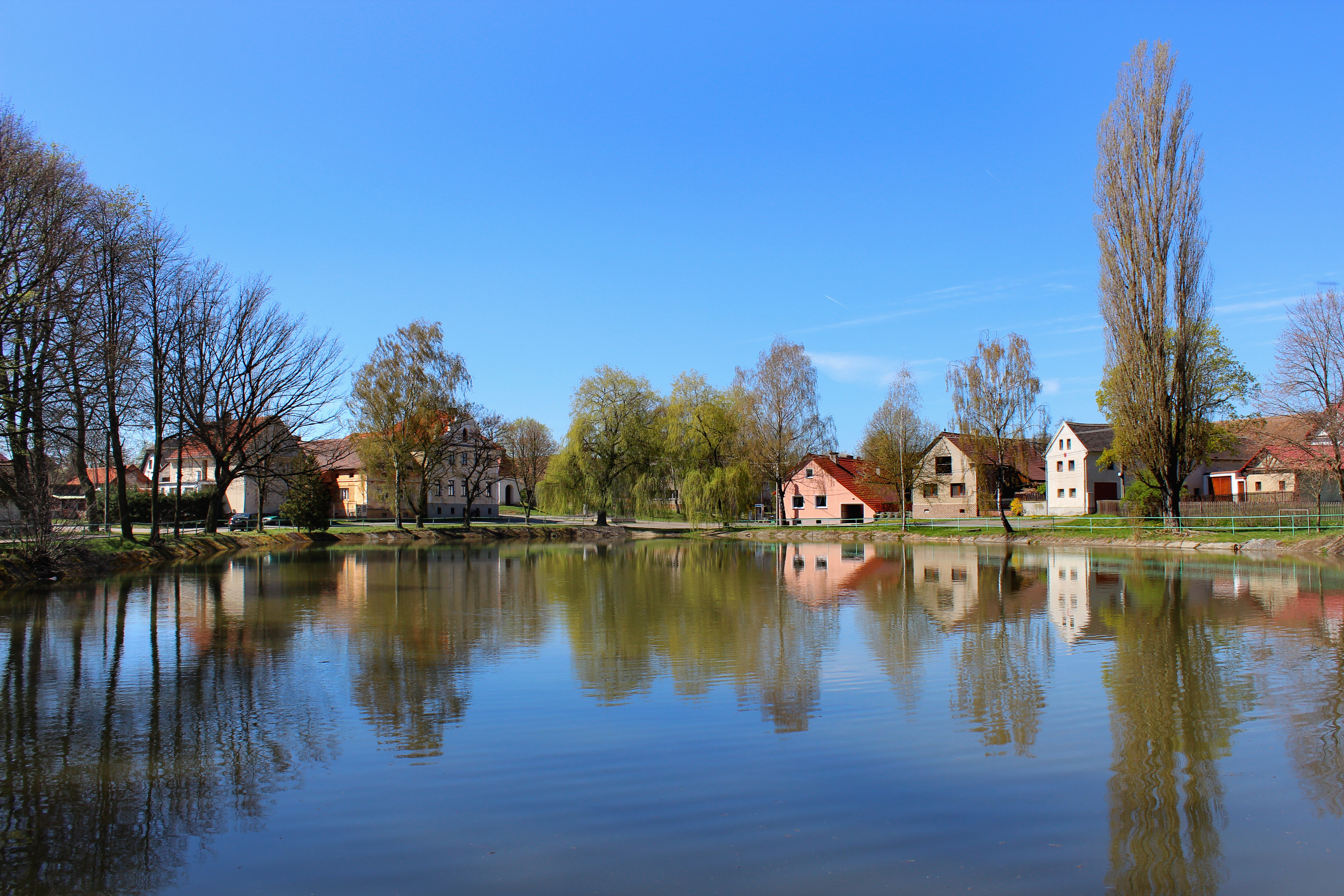
- Pond in the centre of Únehle

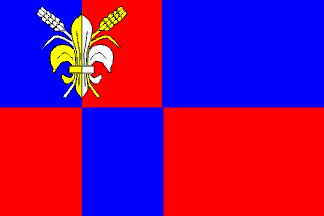
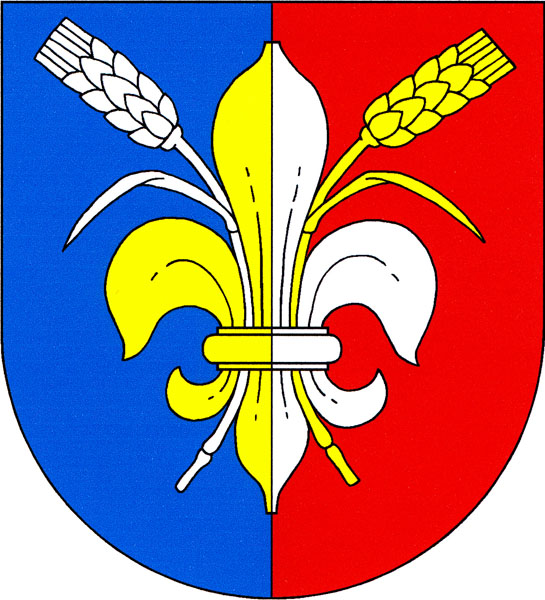
- Flag Coat of arms

- Location in the Czech Republic
- Coordinates: 49°47′30″N 13°0′56″E
- Country: Czech Republic
- Region: Plzeň
- District: Tachov
- First mentioned: 1115

Area
  - Total: 6.06 km^{2} (2.34 sq mi)
- Elevation: 449 m (1,473 ft)

Population (2026-01-01)
  - Total: 140
  - Density: 23/km^{2} (60/sq mi)
- Time zone: UTC+1 (CET)
  - Summer (DST): UTC+2 (CEST)
- Postal code: 349 01
- Website: www.unehle.cz

Únehle is a municipality and village in Tachov District in the Plzeň Region of the Czech Republic. It has about 100 inhabitants.

Únehle lies approximately 30 kilometres (19 mi) east of Tachov, 26 km (16 mi) west of Plzeň, and 106 km (66 mi) west of Prague.

== Demographics ==
Historical population
| Year | Pop. | ±% |
|---|---|---|
| 1869 | 326 | — |
| 1880 | 343 | +5.2% |
| 1890 | 316 | −7.9% |
| 1900 | 312 | −1.3% |
| 1910 | 327 | +4.8% |
| 1921 | 299 | −8.6% |
| 1930 | 299 | +0.0% |
| 1950 | 156 | −47.8% |
| 1961 | 146 | −6.4% |
| 1970 | 136 | −6.8% |
| 1980 | 102 | −25.0% |
| 1991 | 103 | +1.0% |
| 2001 | 109 | +5.8% |
| 2011 | 119 | +9.2% |
| 2021 | 138 | +16.0% |
Source: Censuses
