= Benešovice =

- Municipality
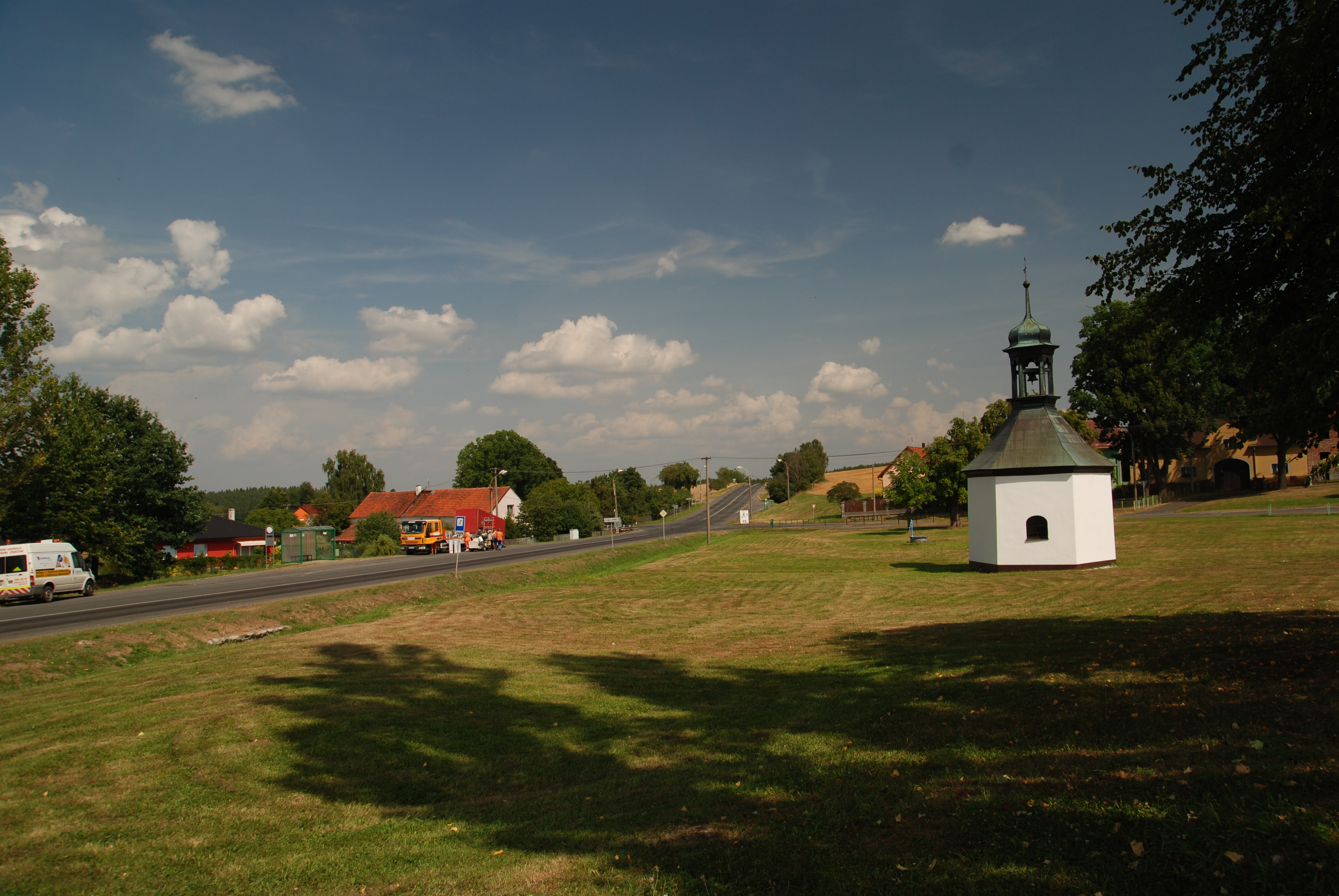
- Chapel of the Virgin Mary

- Flag Coat of arms

- Location in the Czech Republic
- Coordinates: 49°43′37″N 12°54′6″E
- Country: Czech Republic
- Region: Plzeň
- District: Tachov
- First mentioned: 1115

Area
  - Total: 17.17 km^{2} (6.63 sq mi)
- Elevation: 492 m (1,614 ft)

Population (2026-01-01)
  - Total: 281
  - Density: 16.4/km^{2} (42.4/sq mi)
- Time zone: UTC+1 (CET)
  - Summer (DST): UTC+2 (CEST)
- Postal code: 349 01
- Website: www.benesovice.cz

Benešovice is a municipality and village in Tachov District in the Plzeň Region of the Czech Republic. It has about 300 inhabitants.

Benešovice lies approximately 23 kilometres (14 mi) south-east of Tachov, 35 km (22 mi) west of Plzeň, and 117 km (73 mi) west of Prague.

== Administrative division ==
Benešovice consists of two municipal parts (in brackets population according to the 2021 census):

- Benešovice (142)
- Lom u Stříbra (60)

== Demographics ==
Historical population
Year	Pop.	±%
1869	594	—
1880	640	+7.7%
1890	663	+3.6%
1900	675	+1.8%
1910	682	+1.0%
1921	686	+0.6%
1930	675	−1.6%
1950	265	−60.7%
1961	260	−1.9%
1970	267	+2.7%
1980	213	−20.2%
1991	180	−15.5%
2001	156	−13.3%
2011	183	+17.3%
2021	202	+10.4%
Source: Censuses
