= Horní Kozolupy =

- Municipality
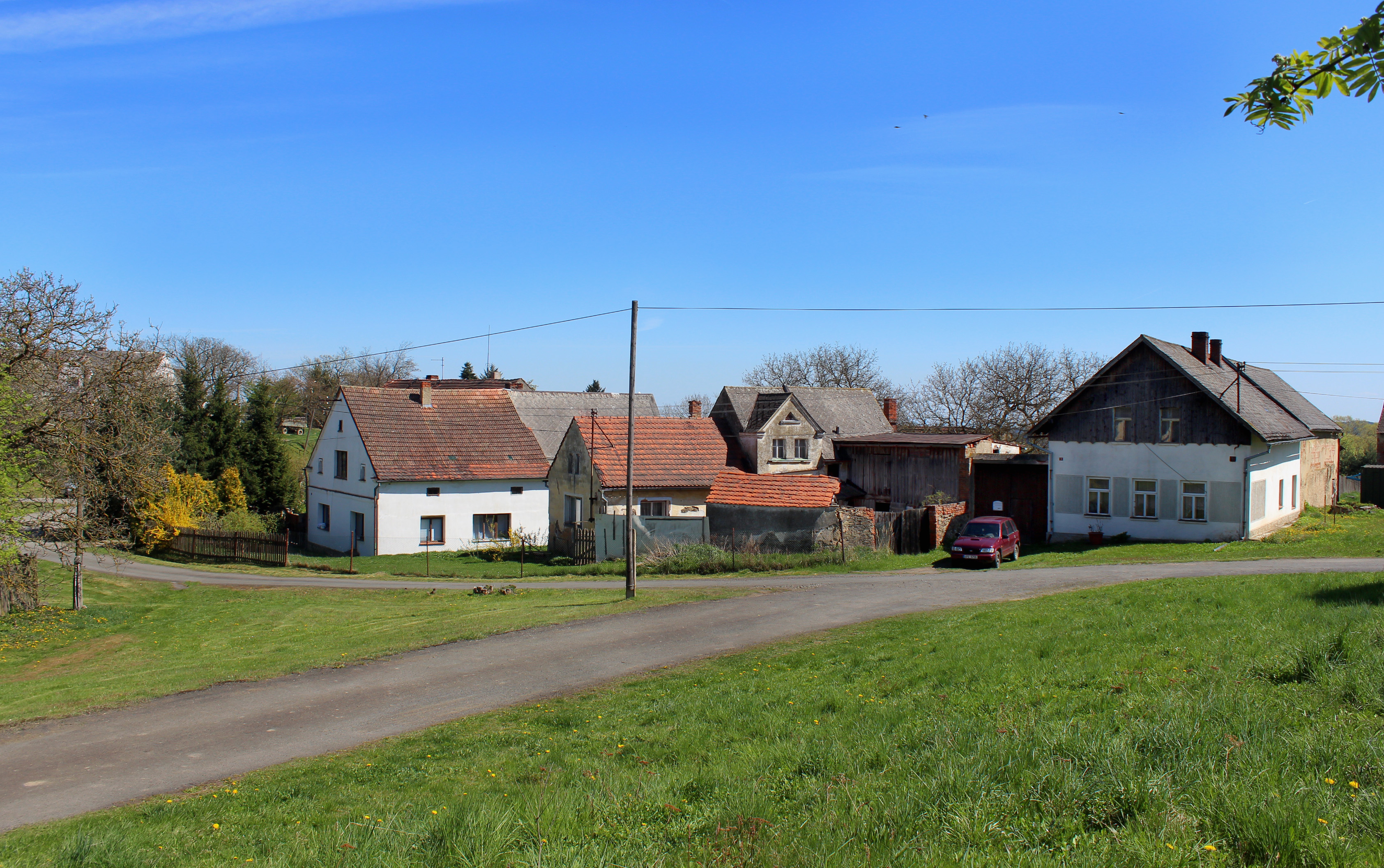
- Centre of Horní Kozolupy

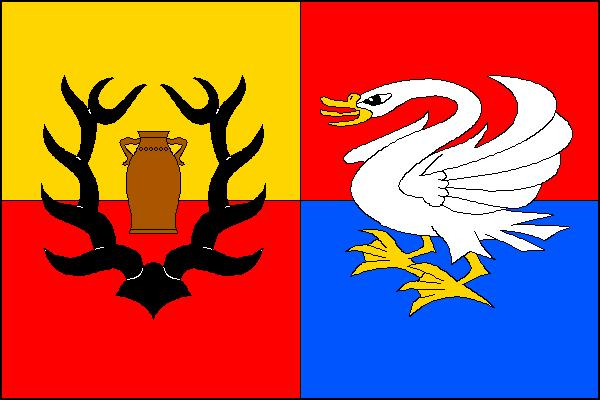
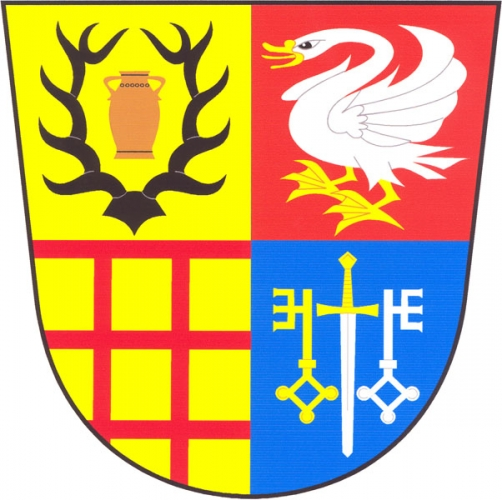
- Flag Coat of arms

- Location in the Czech Republic
- Coordinates: 49°50′15″N 12°56′30″E
- Country: Czech Republic
- Region: Plzeň
- District: Tachov
- First mentioned: 1237

Area
  - Total: 22.76 km^{2} (8.79 sq mi)
- Elevation: 518 m (1,699 ft)

Population (2026-01-01)
  - Total: 255
  - Density: 11.2/km^{2} (29.0/sq mi)
- Time zone: UTC+1 (CET)
  - Summer (DST): UTC+2 (CEST)
- Postal codes: 349 01, 349 52
- Website: www.hornikozolupy.cz

Horní Kozolupy is a municipality and village in Tachov District in the Plzeň Region of the Czech Republic. It has about 300 inhabitants.

Horní Kozolupy lies approximately 24 kilometres (15 mi) east of Tachov, 33 km (21 mi) west of Plzeň, and 110 km (68 mi) west of Prague.

== Administrative division ==
Horní Kozolupy consists of four municipal parts (in brackets population according to the 2021 census):

- Horní Kozolupy (91)
- Očín (12)
- Slavice (92)
- Strahov (51)

== Demographics ==
Historical population
| Year | Pop. | ±% |
|---|---|---|
| 1869 | 880 | — |
| 1880 | 889 | +1.0% |
| 1890 | 987 | +11.0% |
| 1900 | 992 | +0.5% |
| 1910 | 1,020 | +2.8% |
| 1921 | 930 | −8.8% |
| 1930 | 908 | −2.4% |
| 1950 | 498 | −45.2% |
| 1961 | 421 | −15.5% |
| 1970 | 392 | −6.9% |
| 1980 | 341 | −13.0% |
| 1991 | 291 | −14.7% |
| 2001 | 277 | −4.8% |
| 2011 | 231 | −16.6% |
| 2021 | 246 | +6.5% |
Source: Censuses
