= Tachov District =

Tachov District Okres Tachov
- District
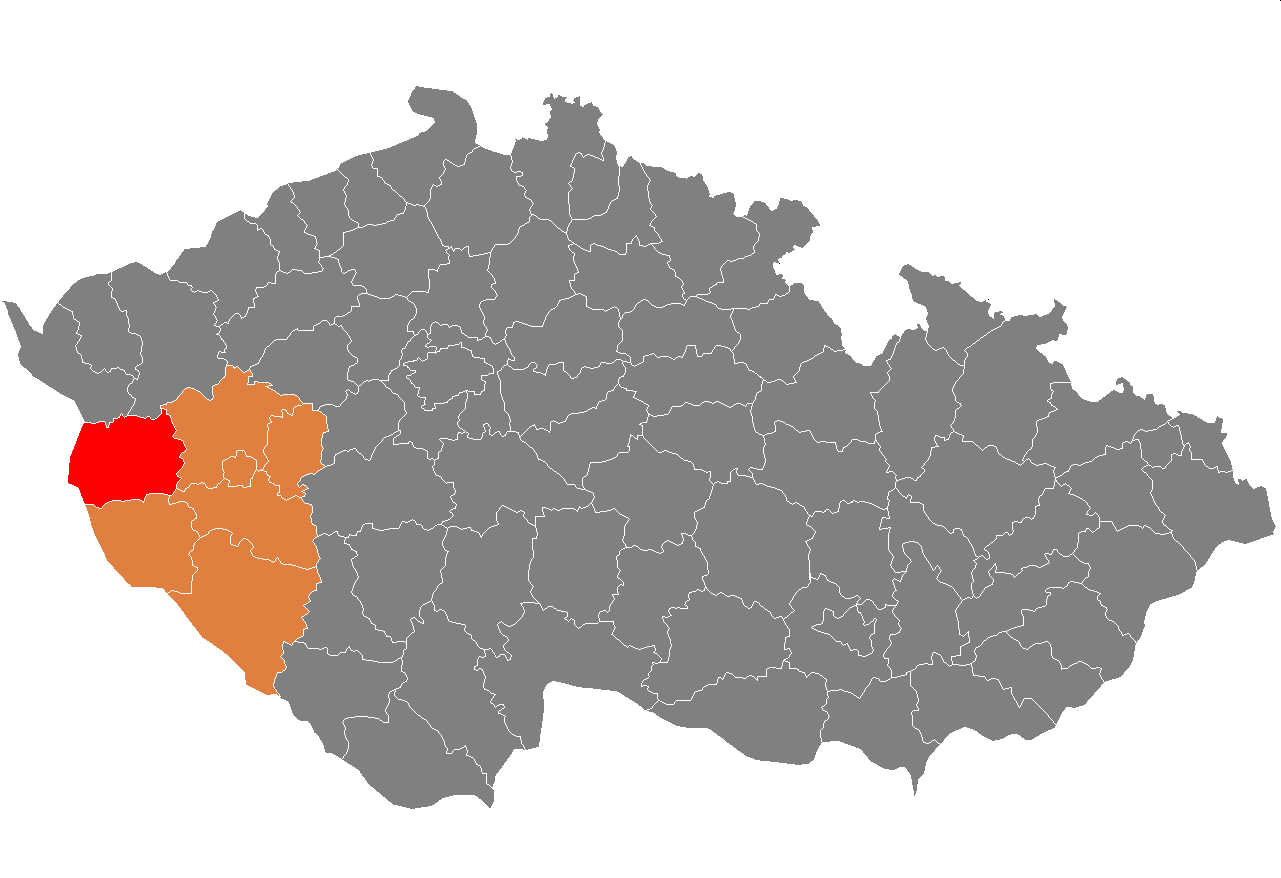
- Location in the Plzeň Region within the Czech Republic
- Coordinates: 49°47′N 12°47′E
- Country: Czech Republic
- Region: Plzeň
- Capital: Tachov

Area
  - Total: 1,378.45 km^{2} (532.22 sq mi)

Population (2026)
  - Total: 57,787
  - Density: 41.922/km^{2} (108.58/sq mi)
- Time zone: UTC+1 (CET)
  - Summer (DST): UTC+2 (CEST)
- Municipalities: 51
- * Towns: 8
- * Market towns: 2

Tachov District (Czech: okres Tachov) is a district in the Plzeň Region of the Czech Republic. Its capital is the town of Tachov.

== Administrative division ==
Tachov District is divided into two administrative districts of municipalities with extended competence: Tachov and Stříbro.

=== List of municipalities ===
Towns are marked in bold and market towns in italics:

Benešovice - Bezdružice - Bor - Brod nad Tichou - Broumov - Částkov - Cebiv - Černošín - Chodová Planá - Chodský Újezd - Ctiboř - Dlouhý Újezd - Erpužice - Halže - Horní Kozolupy - Hošťka - Kladruby - Kočov - Kokašice - Konstantinovy Lázně - Kostelec - Kšice - Lesná - Lestkov - Lom u Tachova - Milíře - Obora - Olbramov - Ošelín - Planá - Přimda - Prostiboř - Rozvadov - Skapce - Staré Sedliště - Staré Sedlo - Stráž - Stříbro - Studánka - Sulislav - Svojšín - Sytno - Tachov - Tisová - Třemešné - Trpísty - Únehle - Vranov - Záchlumí - Zadní Chodov - Zhoř

== Geography ==
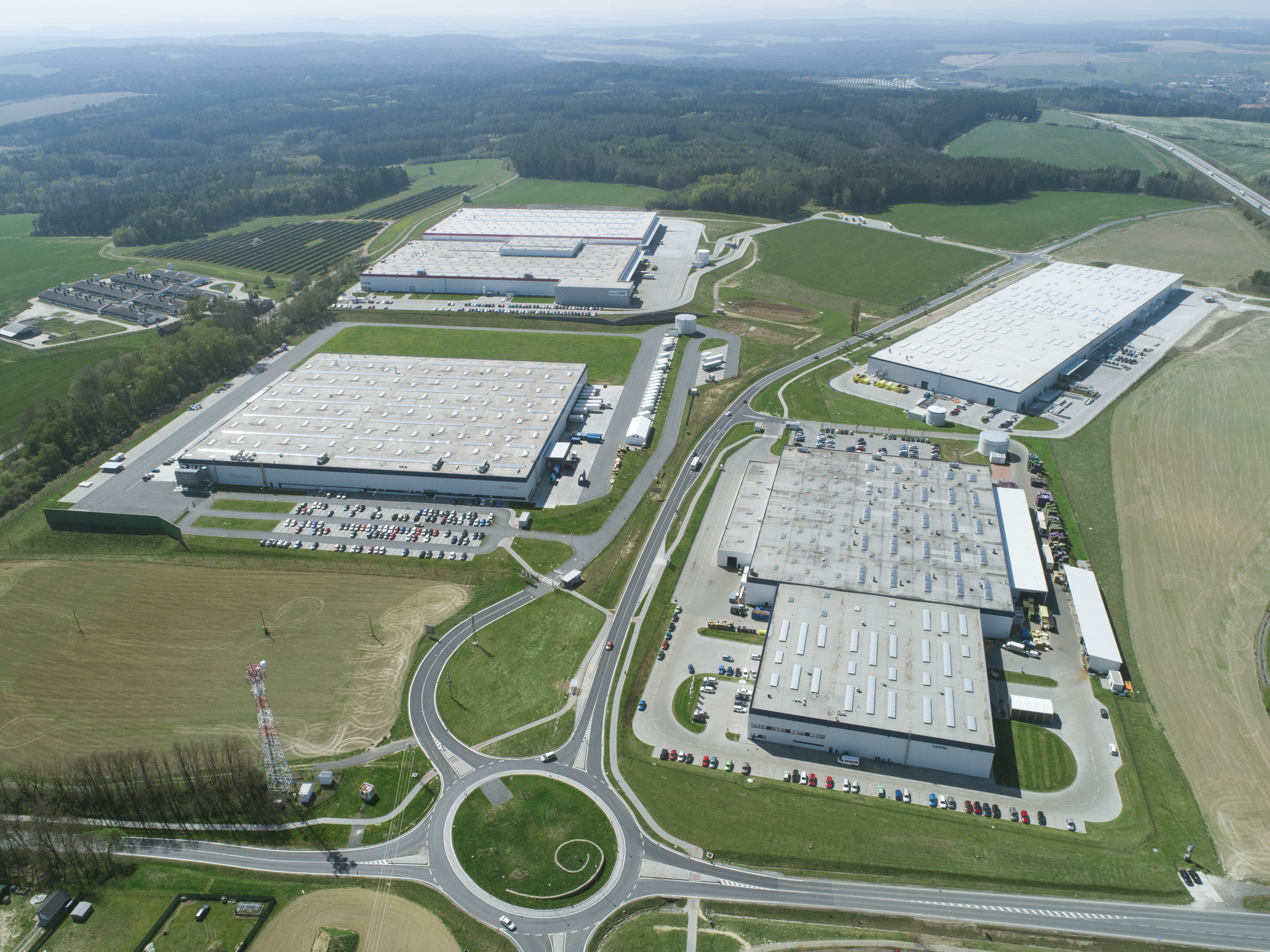
Industrial park in Stříbro and surrounding landscape

Tachov District borders Germany in the west. The terrain is hilly and along the state border, the landscape is mountainous. The territory extends into four geomorphological mesoregions: Plasy Uplands (most of the territory), Upper Palatine Forest (west), Podčeskoleská Hills (a strip along the Upper Palatine Forest) and Teplá Highlands (northeast). The highest point of the district is the mountain Havran in Lesná with an elevation of 894 m (2,933 ft). The lowest point is the Hracholusky Reservoir in Erpužice at 353 m (1,158 ft).

From the total district area of 1,378.5 km^{2} (532.2 sq mi), agricultural land occupies 651.6 km^{2} (251.6 sq mi), forests occupy 601.5 km^{2} (232.2 sq mi), and water area occupies 27.0 km^{2} (10.4 sq mi). Forests cover 43.6% of the district's area.

The only important river is the Mže, which flows across the district from west to east and forms a deep valley. Its longest tributary is the Úhlavka. The central part of the territory is rich in ponds. There are also two reservoirs, Lučina and partly Hracholusky.

There are two protected landscape areas: the northern half of Český les, and the southernmost part of Slavkovský les.

== Demographics ==
Historical population

Year	Pop.	±%
1869	87,797	—
1880	87,770	−0.0%
1890	86,394	−1.6%
1900	87,240	+1.0%
1910	90,048	+3.2%

Year	Pop.	±%
1921	89,235	−0.9%
1930	88,069	−1.3%
1950	41,070	−53.4%
1961	42,683	+3.9%
1970	45,594	+6.8%

Year	Pop.	±%
1980	48,836	+7.1%
1991	50,036	+2.5%
2001	51,439	+2.8%
2011	51,917	+0.9%
2021	52,212	+0.6%

Source: Censuses

=== Most populous municipalities ===
Name	Population	Area (km^{2})
Tachov	14,308	41
Stříbro	8,218	48
Planá	5,528	62
Bor	4,824	116
Chodová Planá	2,004	55
Kladruby	1,668	49
Přimda	1,555	51
Stráž	1,369	54
Staré Sedliště	1,336	37
Černošín	1,193	42

== Economy ==
The largest employers with headquarters in Tachov District and at least 500 employees are:

Economic entity	Location	Number of employees	Main activity
Ideal Automotive	Bor	1,000–1,499	Automotive industry
Loxxess Bor	Bor	1,000–1,499	Transportation support activities
Grammer CZ	Tachov	1,000–1,499	Automotive industry
King's Entertainment	Rozvadov	500–999	Gambling and betting activities
Kermi	Stříbro	500–999	Manufacture of central heating radiators
RSF Elektronik	Stříbro	500–999	Manufacture of electrical equipment

== Transport ==
The D5 motorway (part of the European route E50) from Prague to Plzeň and the Czech–German border runs through the district.

== Sights ==
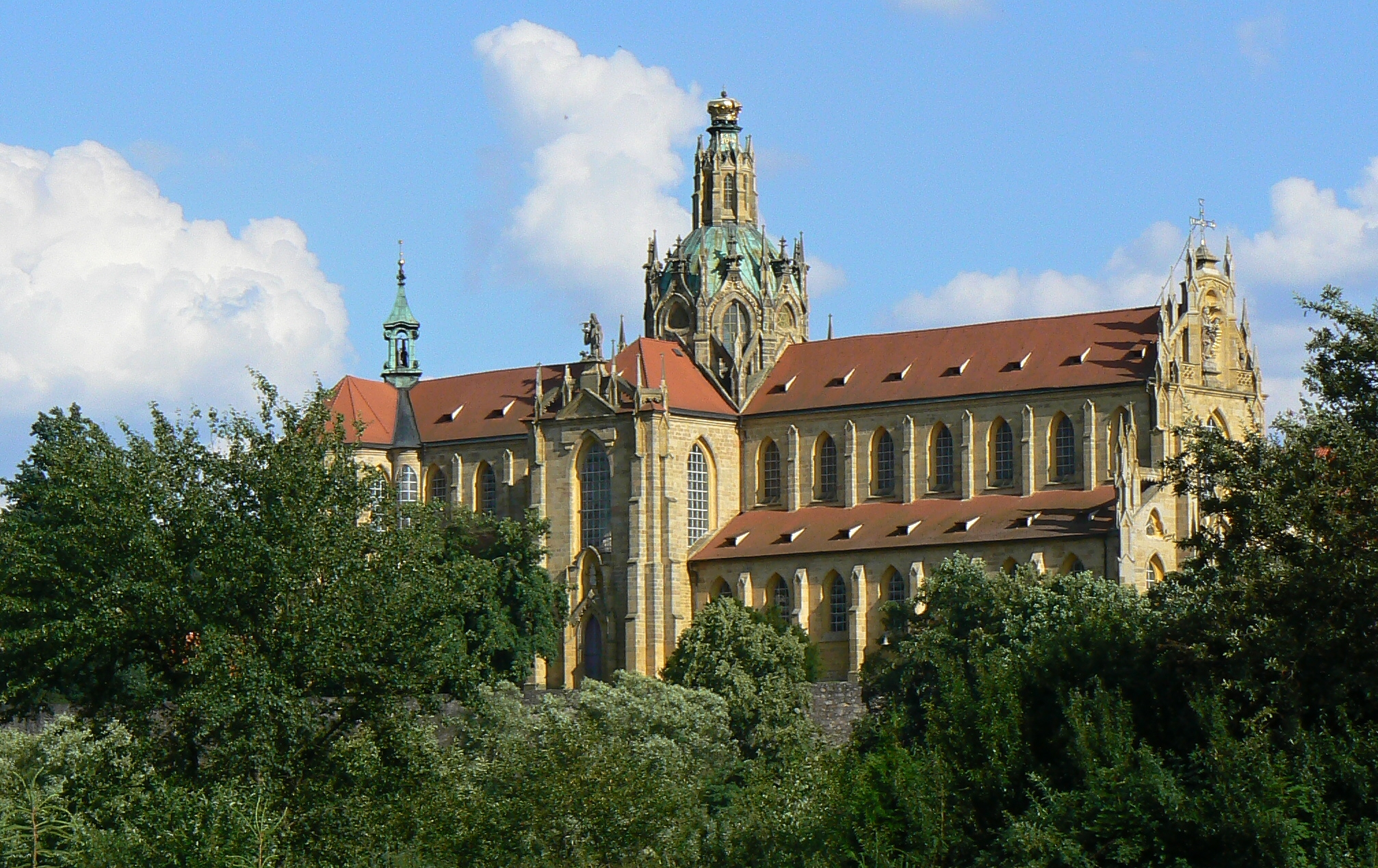
Kladruby Monastery

The most important monuments in the district, protected as national cultural monuments, are:

- Přimda Castle
- Slavic gord and burial mound in Bezemín
- Kladruby Monastery
- Hradišťský kopec gord in Okrouhlé Hradiště
- Riding hall in Světce

The best-preserved settlements, protected as monument zones, are:

- Bor
- Planá
- Stříbro
- Tachov
- Chodský Újezd
- Horní Jadruž
- Pačín
- Prostiboř
- Zadní Chodov

The most visited tourist destinations are the Kladruby Monastery and Přimda Castle.
