= Olbramov =

- Municipality
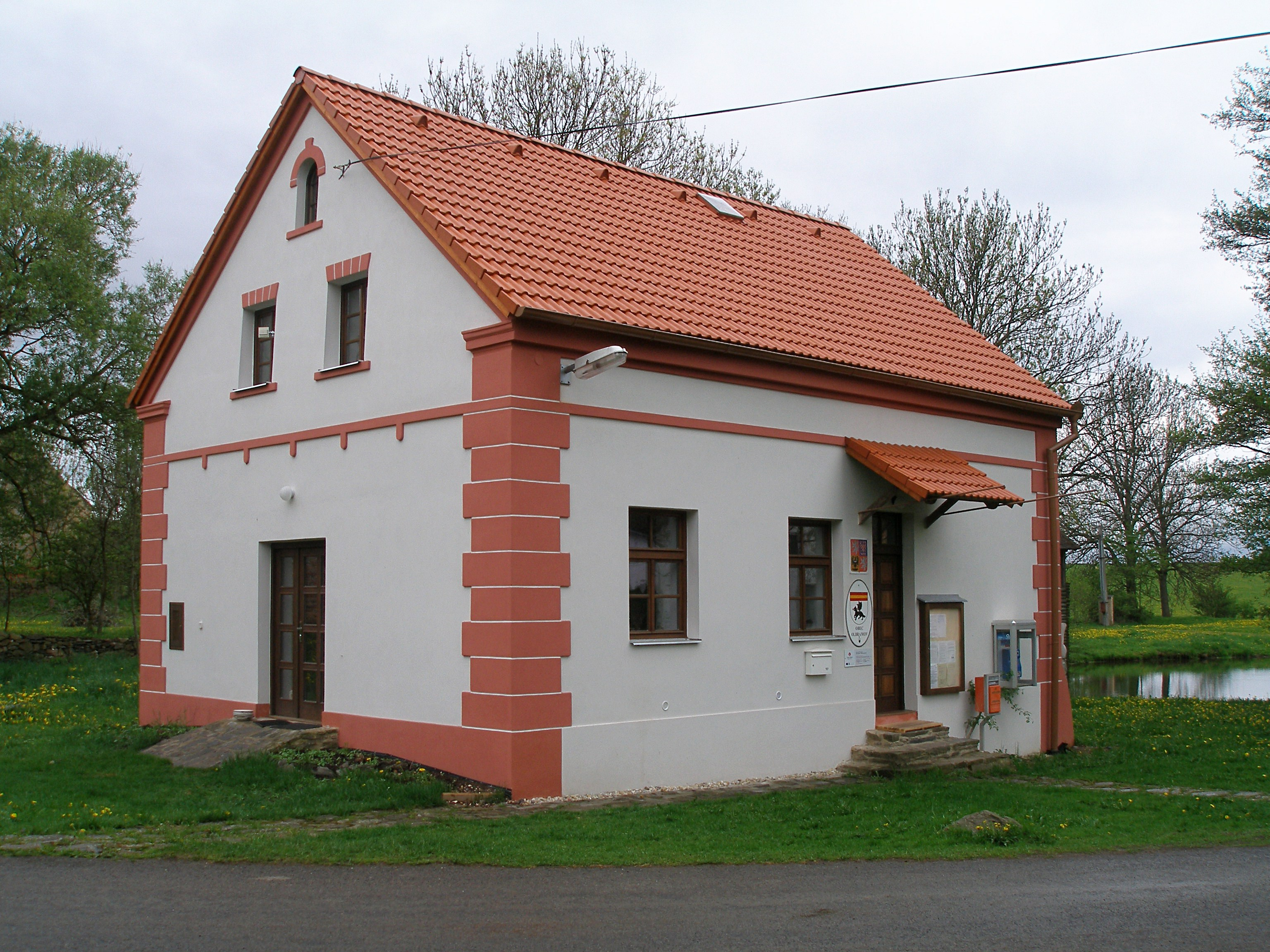
- Municipal office

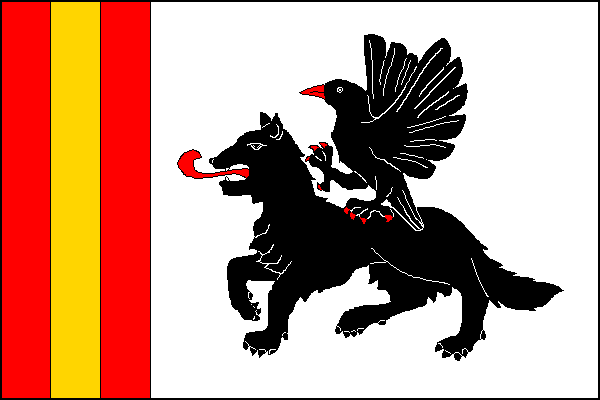
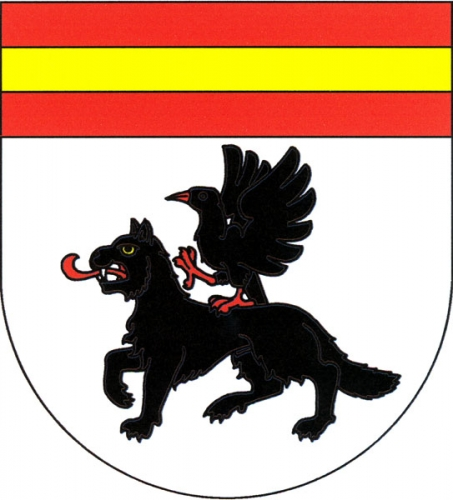
- Flag Coat of arms

- Location in the Czech Republic
- Coordinates: 49°50′37″N 12°52′0″E
- Country: Czech Republic
- Region: Plzeň
- District: Tachov
- First mentioned: 1237

Area
  - Total: 14.93 km^{2} (5.76 sq mi)
- Elevation: 566 m (1,857 ft)

Population (2026-01-01)
  - Total: 80
  - Density: 5.4/km^{2} (14/sq mi)
- Time zone: UTC+1 (CET)
  - Summer (DST): UTC+2 (CEST)
- Postal codes: 349 01, 349 53
- Website: www.olbramov.cz

Olbramov (German: Wolfersdorf) is a municipality and village in Tachov District in the Plzeň Region of the Czech Republic. It has about 80 inhabitants.

Olbramov lies approximately 19 kilometres (12 mi) east of Tachov, 39 km (24 mi) west of Plzeň, and 115 km (71 mi) west of Prague.

== Administrative division ==
Olbramov consists of three municipal parts (in brackets population according to the 2021 census):

- Olbramov (45)
- Kořen (27)
- Zádub (3)

== Demographics ==
Historical population
Year	Pop.	±%
1869	818	—
1880	770	−5.9%
1890	788	+2.3%
1900	798	+1.3%
1910	778	−2.5%
1921	696	−10.5%
1930	670	−3.7%
1950	226	−66.3%
1961	210	−7.1%
1970	132	−37.1%
1980	101	−23.5%
1991	75	−25.7%
2001	78	+4.0%
2011	56	−28.2%
2021	75	+33.9%
Source: Censuses
