= Kokašice =

- Municipality
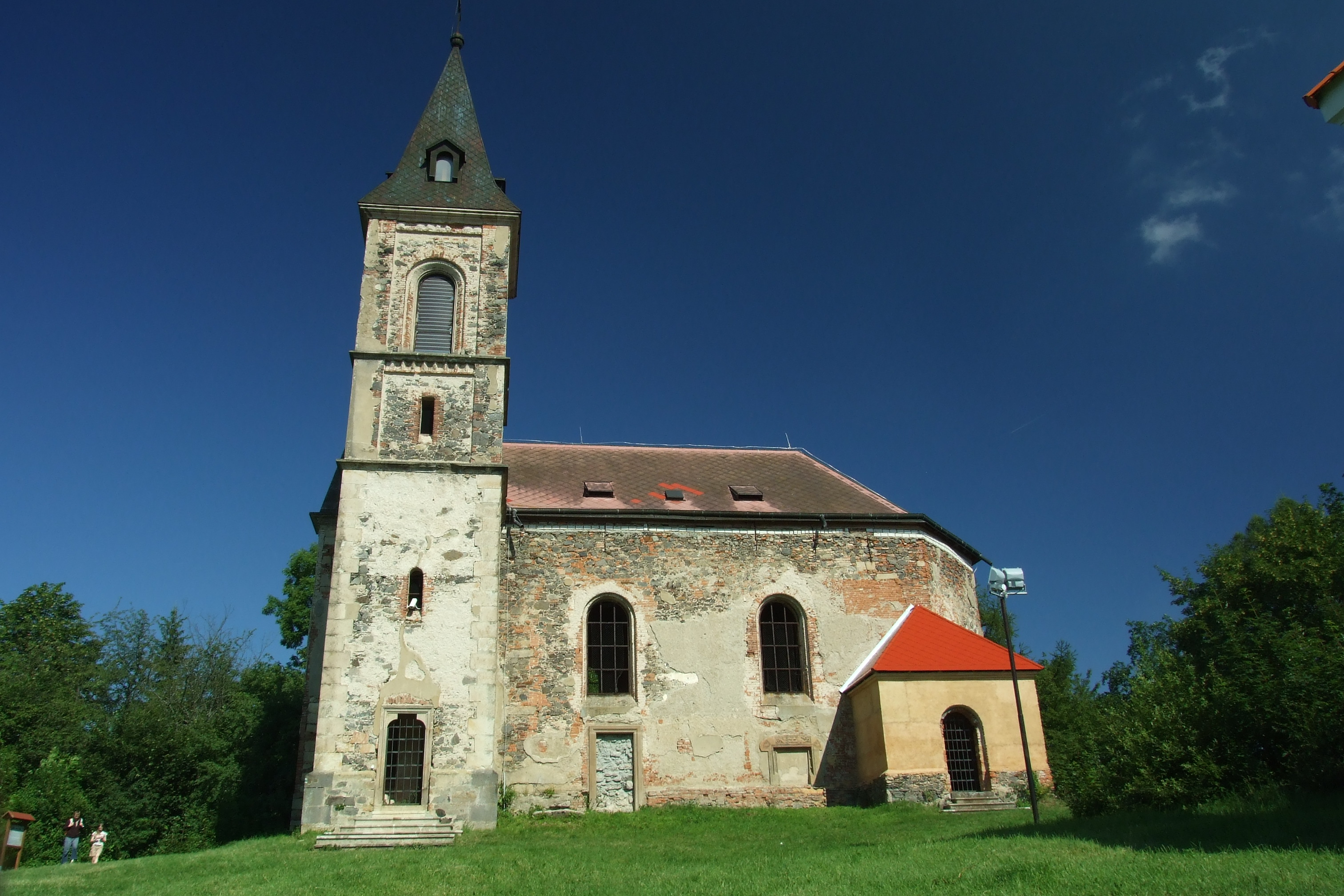
- Church of Saint Mary Magdalene

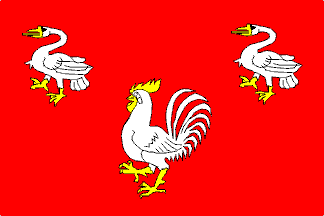
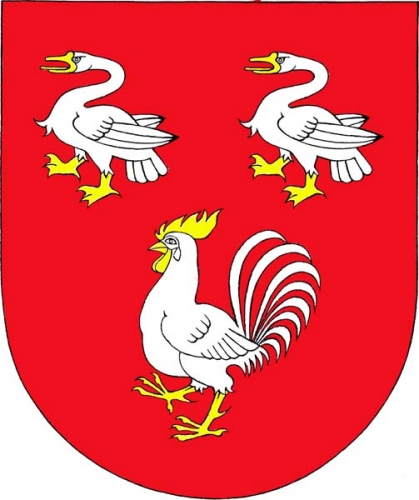
- Flag Coat of arms

- Location in the Czech Republic
- Coordinates: 49°52′42″N 12°56′50″E
- Country: Czech Republic
- Region: Plzeň
- District: Tachov
- First mentioned: 1227

Area
  - Total: 13.45 km^{2} (5.19 sq mi)
- Elevation: 526 m (1,726 ft)

Population (2026-01-01)
  - Total: 282
  - Density: 21.0/km^{2} (54.3/sq mi)
- Time zone: UTC+1 (CET)
  - Summer (DST): UTC+2 (CEST)
- Postal codes: 349 52, 349 53
- Website: www.kokasice.cz

Kokašice is a municipality and village in Tachov District in the Plzeň Region of the Czech Republic. It has about 300 inhabitants.

Kokašice lies approximately 25 kilometres (16 mi) east of Tachov, 35 km (22 mi) north-west of Plzeň, and 109 km (68 mi) west of Prague.

== Administrative division ==
Kokašice consists of four municipal parts (in brackets population according to the 2021 census):

- Kokašice (201)
- Čeliv (12)
- Krasíkov (0)
- Lomy (36)

== Demographics ==
Historical population
| Year | Pop. | ±% |
|---|---|---|
| 1869 | 654 | — |
| 1880 | 698 | +6.7% |
| 1890 | 707 | +1.3% |
| 1900 | 732 | +3.5% |
| 1910 | 724 | −1.1% |
| 1921 | 704 | −2.8% |
| 1930 | 698 | −0.9% |
| 1950 | 347 | −50.3% |
| 1961 | 311 | −10.4% |
| 1970 | 293 | −5.8% |
| 1980 | 233 | −20.5% |
| 1991 | 284 | +21.9% |
| 2001 | 295 | +3.9% |
| 2011 | 259 | −12.2% |
| 2021 | 249 | −3.9% |
Source: Censuses

== Notable people ==
- Franz Melnitzky (1822–1876), Austrian sculptor
