= Skapce =

- Municipality
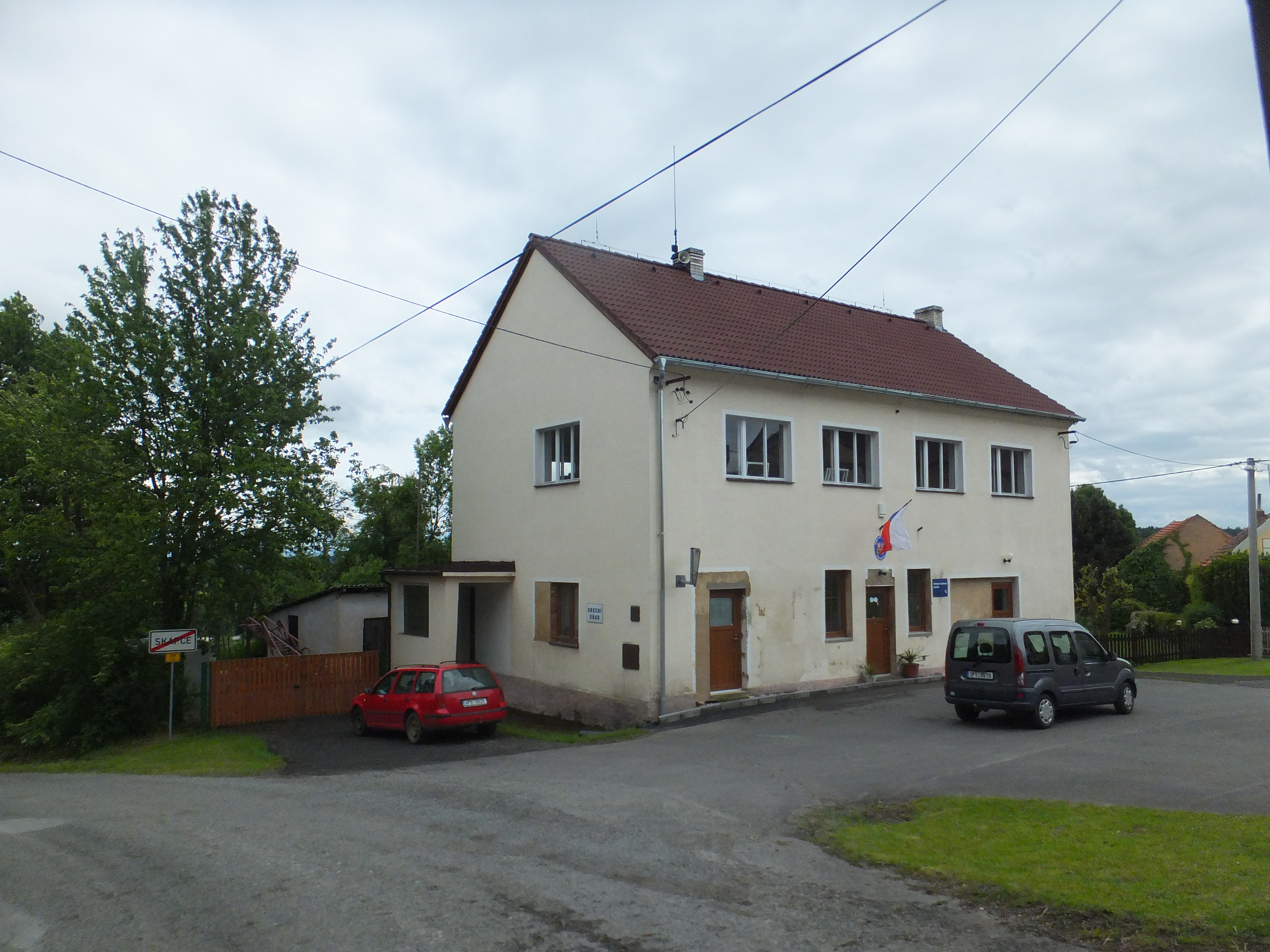
- Municipal office

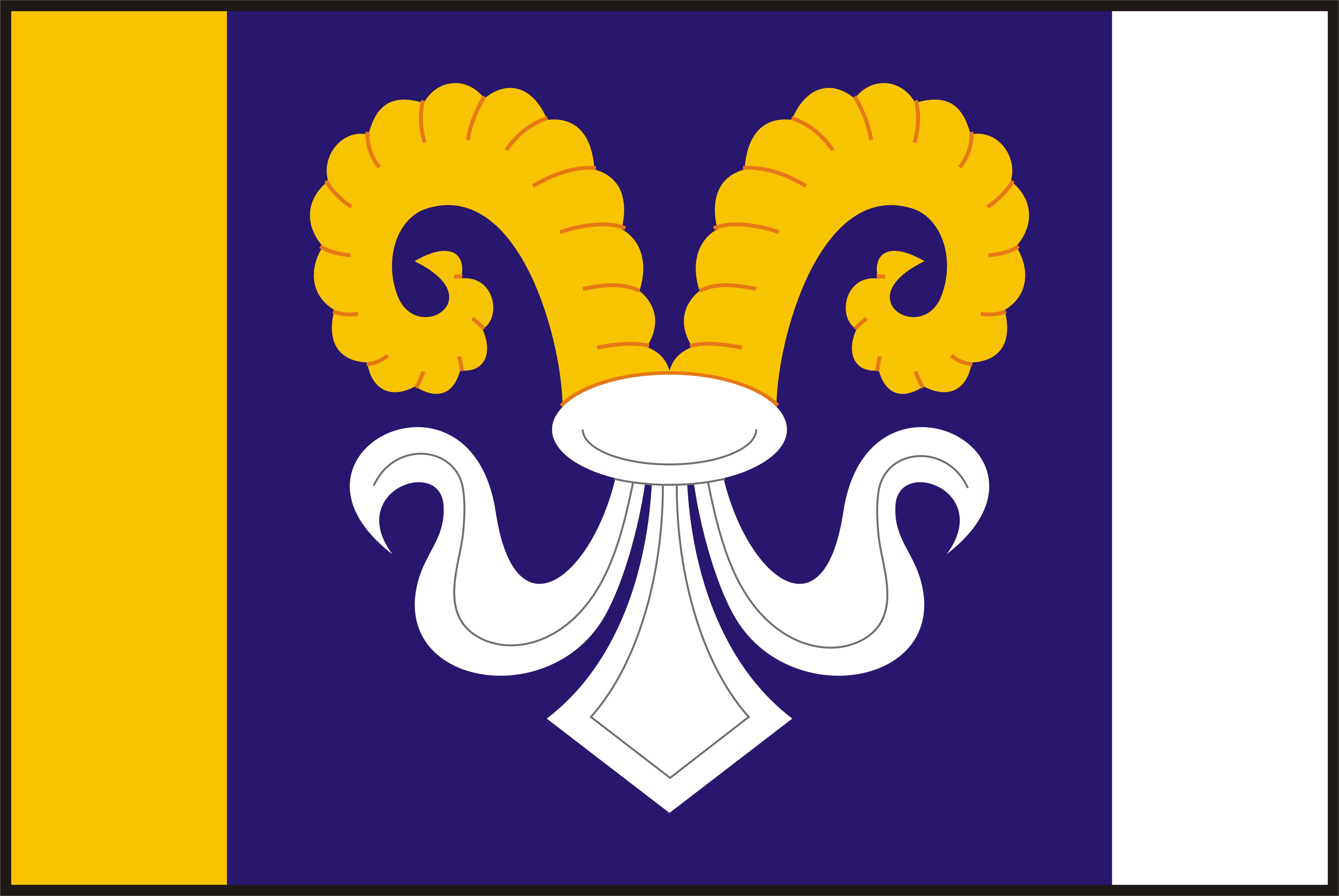
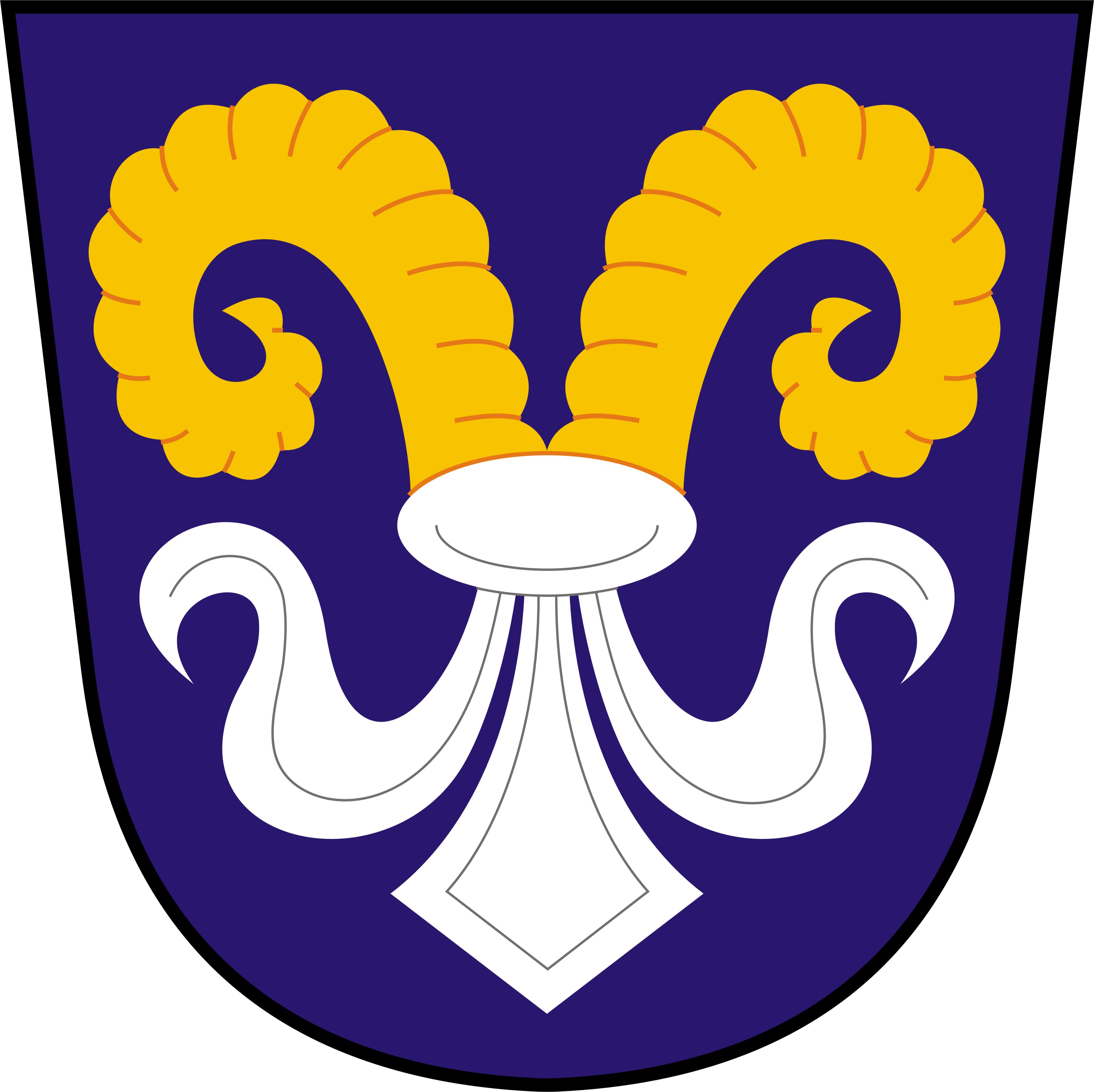
- Flag Coat of arms

- Location in the Czech Republic
- Coordinates: 49°39′25″N 12°59′25″E
- Country: Czech Republic
- Region: Plzeň
- District: Tachov
- First mentioned: 1115

Area
  - Total: 7.98 km^{2} (3.08 sq mi)
- Elevation: 496 m (1,627 ft)

Population (2026-01-01)
  - Total: 117
  - Density: 14.7/km^{2} (38.0/sq mi)
- Time zone: UTC+1 (CET)
  - Summer (DST): UTC+2 (CEST)
- Postal code: 349 01
- Website: www.skapce.cz

Skapce is a municipality and village in Tachov District in the Plzeň Region of the Czech Republic. It has about 100 inhabitants.

Skapce lies approximately 32 kilometres (20 mi) south-east of Tachov, 30 km (19 mi) west of Plzeň, and 114 km (71 mi) south-west of Prague.

== Administrative division ==
Skapce consists of three municipal parts (in brackets population according to the 2021 census):

- Skapce (55)
- Krtín (6)
- Zálezly (56)

== Demographics ==
Historical population
Year	Pop.	±%
1869	380	—
1880	376	−1.1%
1890	405	+7.7%
1900	444	+9.6%
1910	443	−0.2%
1921	426	−3.8%
1930	446	+4.7%
1950	136	−69.5%
1961	188	+38.2%
1970	146	−22.3%
1980	201	+37.7%
1991	177	−11.9%
2001	117	−33.9%
2011	87	−25.6%
2021	117	+34.5%
Source: Censuses
