= Hošťka =

- Municipality
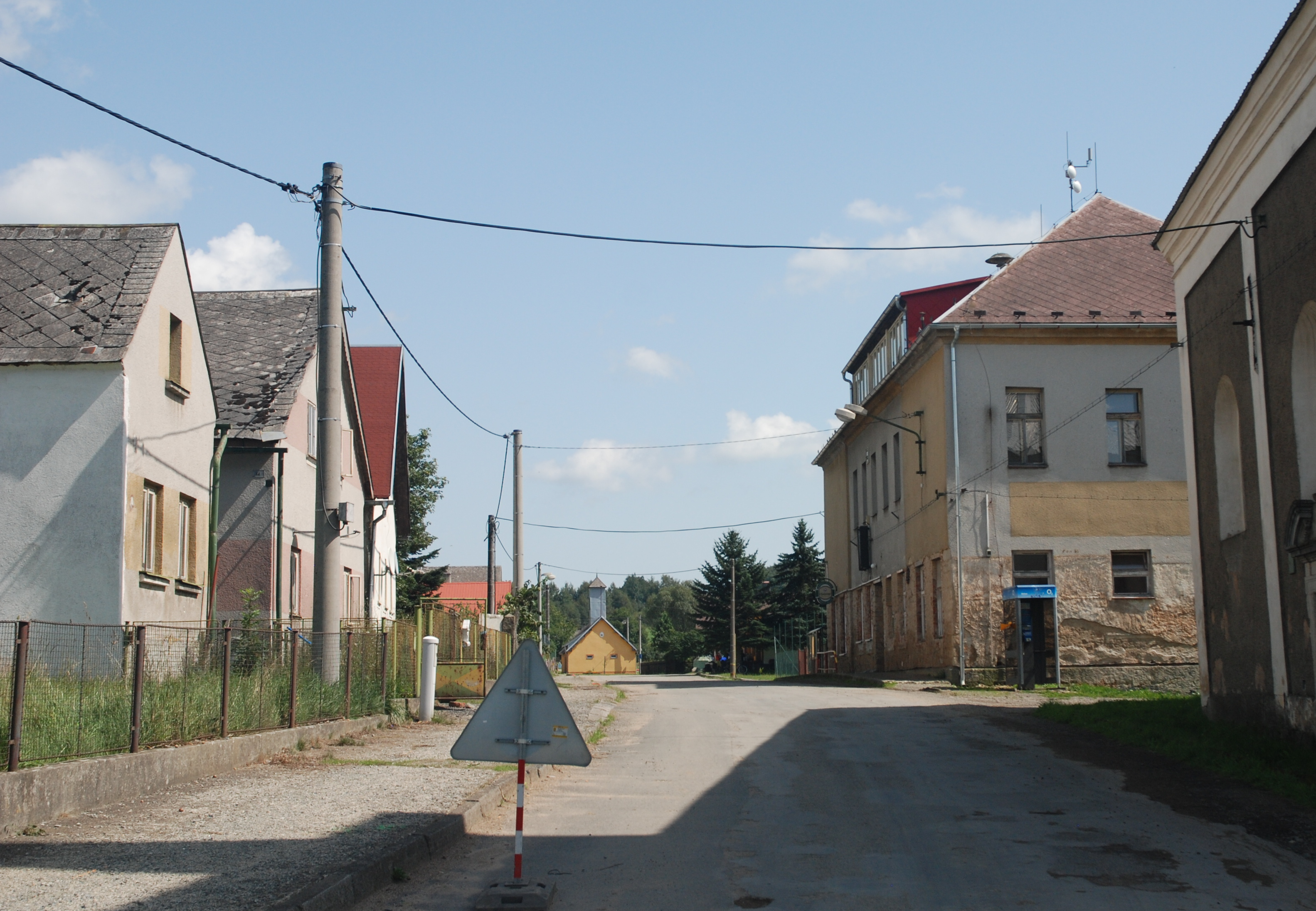
- A street in Hošťka

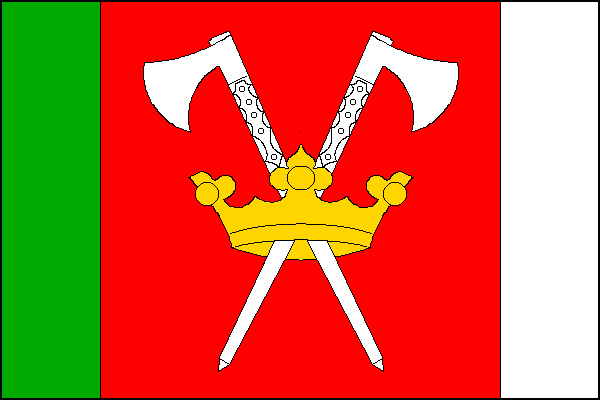
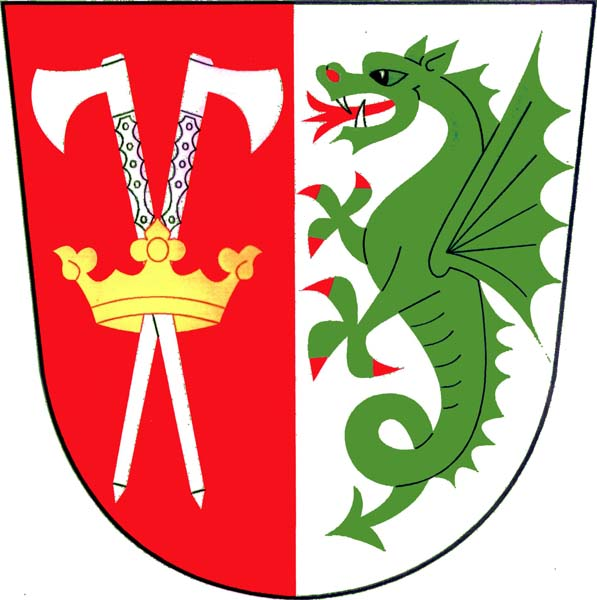
- Flag Coat of arms

- Location in the Czech Republic
- Coordinates: 49°41′47″N 12°35′31″E
- Country: Czech Republic
- Region: Plzeň
- District: Tachov
- First mentioned: 1482

Area
  - Total: 36.12 km^{2} (13.95 sq mi)
- Elevation: 558 m (1,831 ft)

Population (2026-01-01)
  - Total: 457
  - Density: 12.7/km^{2} (32.8/sq mi)
- Time zone: UTC+1 (CET)
  - Summer (DST): UTC+2 (CEST)
- Postal code: 348 06
- Website: www.hostka-tc.cz

Hošťka is a municipality and village in Tachov District in the Plzeň Region of the Czech Republic. It has about 500 inhabitants.

Hošťka lies approximately 12 kilometres (7 mi) south of Tachov, 57 km (35 mi) west of Plzeň, and 139 km (86 mi) west of Prague.

== Administrative division ==
Hošťka consists of two municipal parts (in brackets population according to the 2021 census):

- Hošťka (328)
- Žebráky (96)

== Demographics ==
Historical population
Year	Pop.	±%
1869	2,816	—
1880	2,873	+2.0%
1890	2,626	−8.6%
1900	2,533	−3.5%
1910	2,690	+6.2%
1921	2,572	−4.4%
1930	2,329	−9.4%
1950	383	−83.6%
1961	501	+30.8%
1970	552	+10.2%
1980	461	−16.5%
1991	366	−20.6%
2001	393	+7.4%
2011	363	−7.6%
2021	424	+16.8%
Source: Censuses
