= Částkov (Tachov District) =

- Municipality
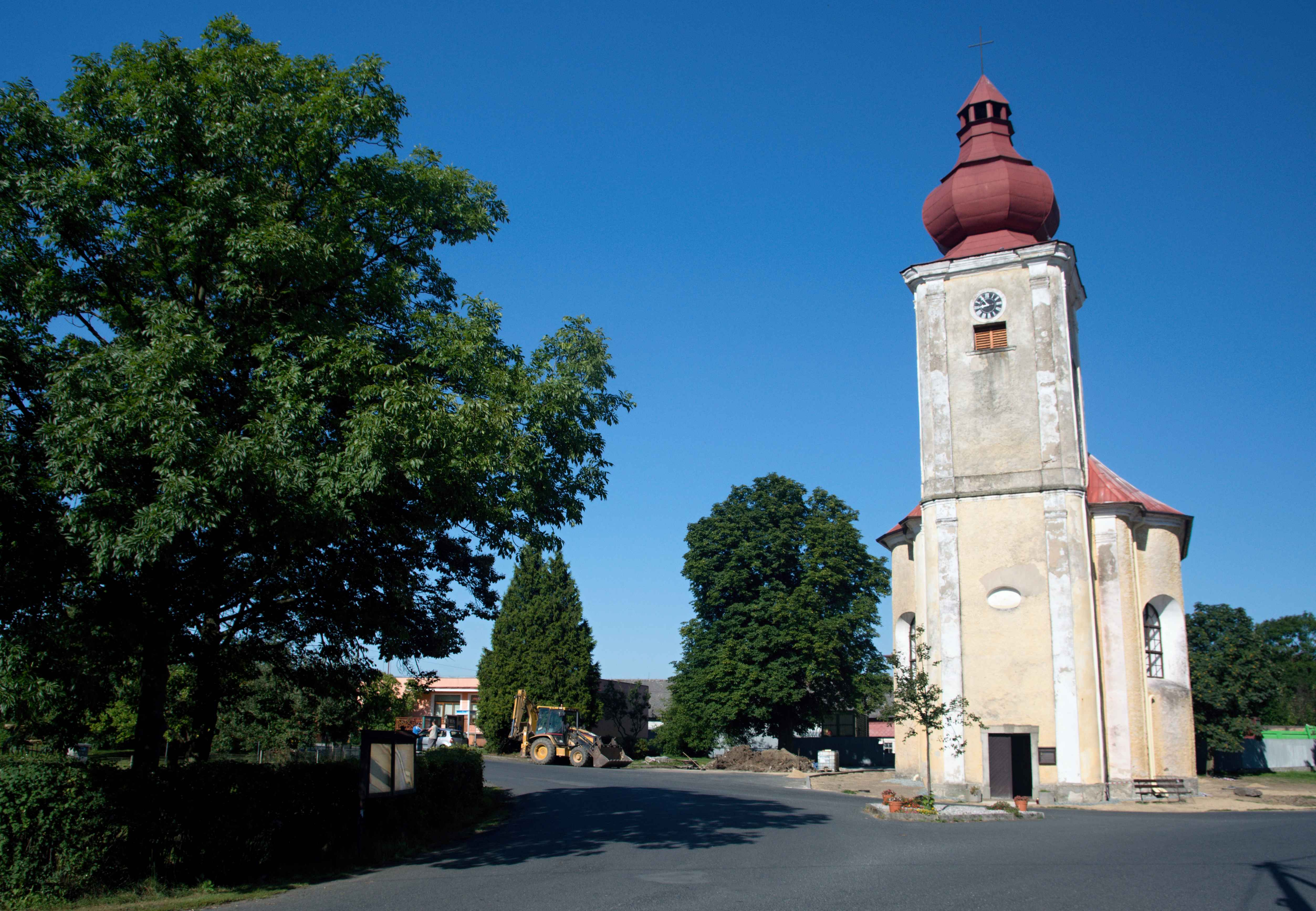
- Church of Saint Anne

- Flag Coat of arms

- Location in the Czech Republic
- Coordinates: 49°45′22″N 12°40′25″E
- Country: Czech Republic
- Region: Plzeň
- District: Tachov
- First mentioned: 1272

Area
  - Total: 11.86 km^{2} (4.58 sq mi)
- Elevation: 503 m (1,650 ft)

Population (2026-01-01)
  - Total: 344
  - Density: 29.0/km^{2} (75.1/sq mi)
- Time zone: UTC+1 (CET)
  - Summer (DST): UTC+2 (CEST)
- Postal code: 348 01
- Website: www.castkov.cz

Částkov (German: Schossenreith) is a municipality and village in Tachov District in the Plzeň Region of the Czech Republic. It has about 300 inhabitants.

Částkov lies approximately 7 kilometres (4 mi) south-east of Tachov, 51 km (32 mi) west of Plzeň, and 131 km (81 mi) west of Prague.

== Administrative division ==
Částkov consists of three municipal parts (in brackets population according to the 2021 census):

- Částkov (215)
- Maršovy Chody (57)
- Pernolec (59)

== Demographics ==
Historical population
Year	Pop.	±%
1869	729	—
1880	700	−4.0%
1890	680	−2.9%
1900	657	−3.4%
1910	728	+10.8%
1921	686	−5.8%
1930	619	−9.8%
1950	333	−46.2%
1961	332	−0.3%
1970	306	−7.8%
1980	290	−5.2%
1991	275	−5.2%
2001	306	+11.3%
2011	339	+10.8%
2021	331	−2.4%
Source: Censuses
