= Dlouhý Újezd =

- Municipality
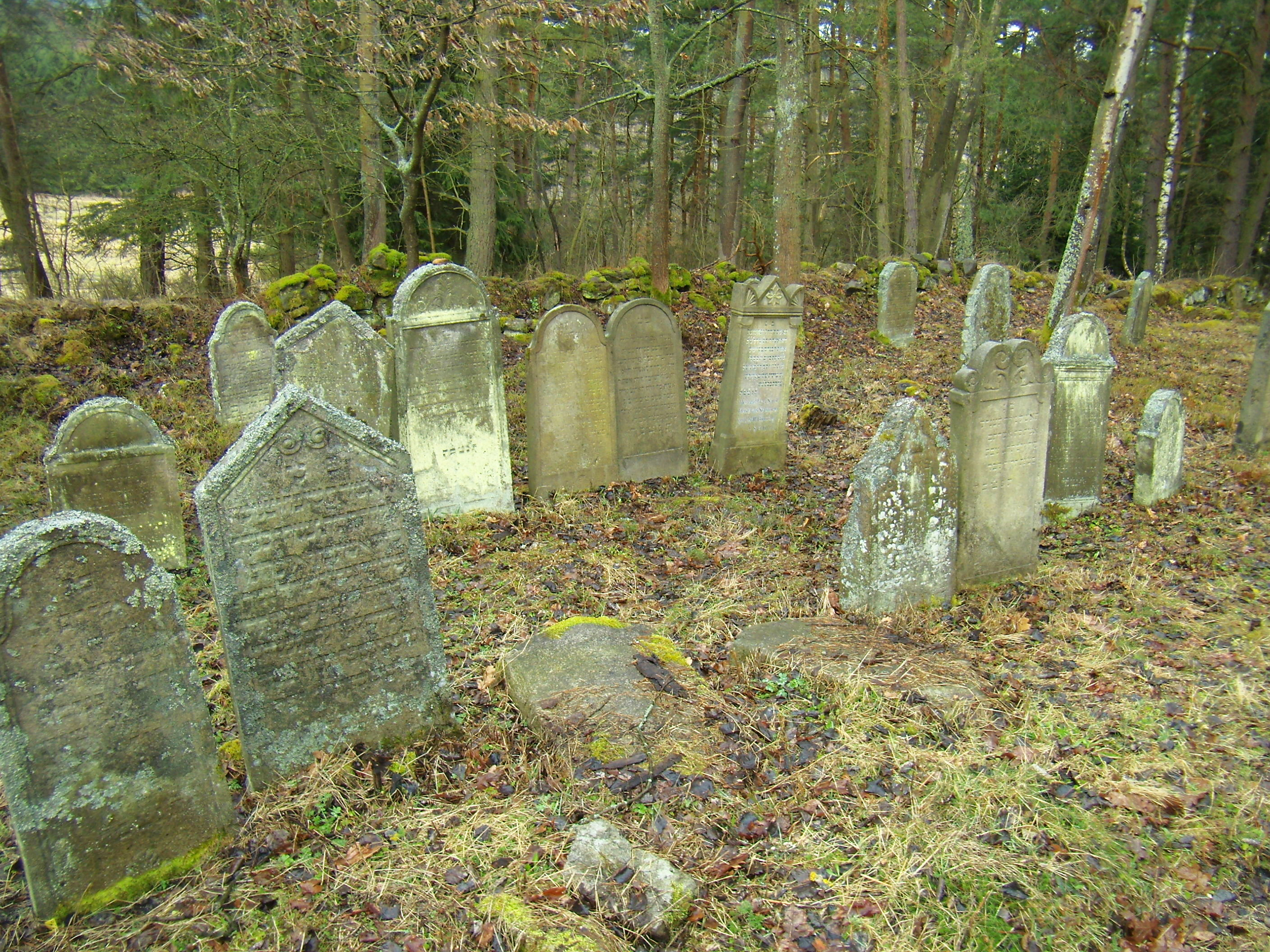
- Jewish cemetery

- Flag Coat of arms

- Location in the Czech Republic
- Coordinates: 49°46′6″N 12°37′43″E
- Country: Czech Republic
- Region: Plzeň
- District: Tachov
- First mentioned: 1361

Area
  - Total: 8.50 km^{2} (3.28 sq mi)
- Elevation: 527 m (1,729 ft)

Population (2026-01-01)
  - Total: 394
  - Density: 46.4/km^{2} (120/sq mi)
- Time zone: UTC+1 (CET)
  - Summer (DST): UTC+2 (CEST)
- Postal code: 347 01
- Website: www.dlouhyujezd.cz

Dlouhý Újezd (German: Langendörflas) is a municipality and village in Tachov District in the Plzeň Region of the Czech Republic. It has about 400 inhabitants.

Dlouhý Újezd lies approximately 5 kilometres (3 mi) south of Tachov, 56 km (35 mi) west of Plzeň, and 136 km (85 mi) west of Prague.

== Demographics ==
Historical population
Year	Pop.	±%
1869	840	—
1880	630	−25.0%
1890	641	+1.7%
1900	724	+12.9%
1910	727	+0.4%
1921	675	−7.2%
1930	647	−4.1%
1950	275	−57.5%
1961	264	−4.0%
1970	282	+6.8%
1980	277	−1.8%
1991	235	−15.2%
2001	279	+18.7%
2011	373	+33.7%
2021	385	+3.2%
Source: Censuses
