= Vranov (Tachov District) =

- Municipality
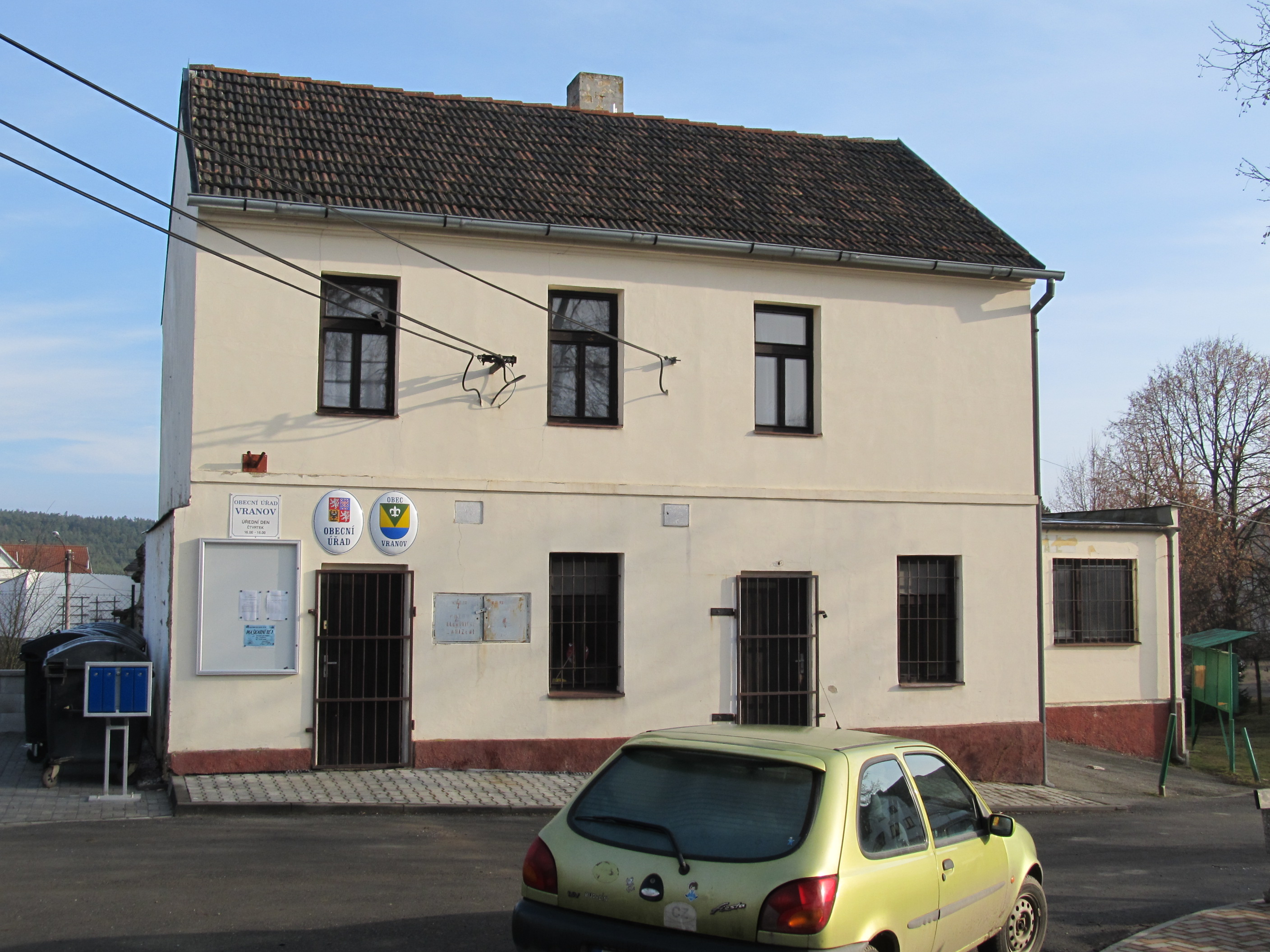
- Municipal office

- Flag Coat of arms

- Location in the Czech Republic
- Coordinates: 49°45′52″N 13°2′31″E
- Country: Czech Republic
- Region: Plzeň
- District: Tachov
- First mentioned: 1231

Area
  - Total: 4.83 km^{2} (1.86 sq mi)
- Elevation: 392 m (1,286 ft)

Population (2026-01-01)
  - Total: 212
  - Density: 43.9/km^{2} (114/sq mi)
- Time zone: UTC+1 (CET)
  - Summer (DST): UTC+2 (CEST)
- Postal code: 349 01
- Website: www.vranov-tc.cz

Vranov is a municipality and village in Tachov District in the Plzeň Region of the Czech Republic. It has about 200 inhabitants.

Vranov lies approximately 31 kilometres (19 mi) east of Tachov, 25 km (16 mi) west of Plzeň, and 106 km (66 mi) west of Prague.

== Administrative division ==
Vranov consists of two municipal parts (in brackets population according to the 2021 census):

- Vranov (122)
- Svinná (69)

== Demographics ==
Historical population
Year	Pop.	±%
1869	294	—
1880	283	−3.7%
1890	317	+12.0%
1900	325	+2.5%
1910	331	+1.8%
1921	304	−8.2%
1930	284	−6.6%
1950	211	−25.7%
1961	282	+33.6%
1970	196	−30.5%
1980	158	−19.4%
1991	127	−19.6%
2001	128	+0.8%
2011	153	+19.5%
2021	191	+24.8%
Source: Censuses
