= Kosový potok =

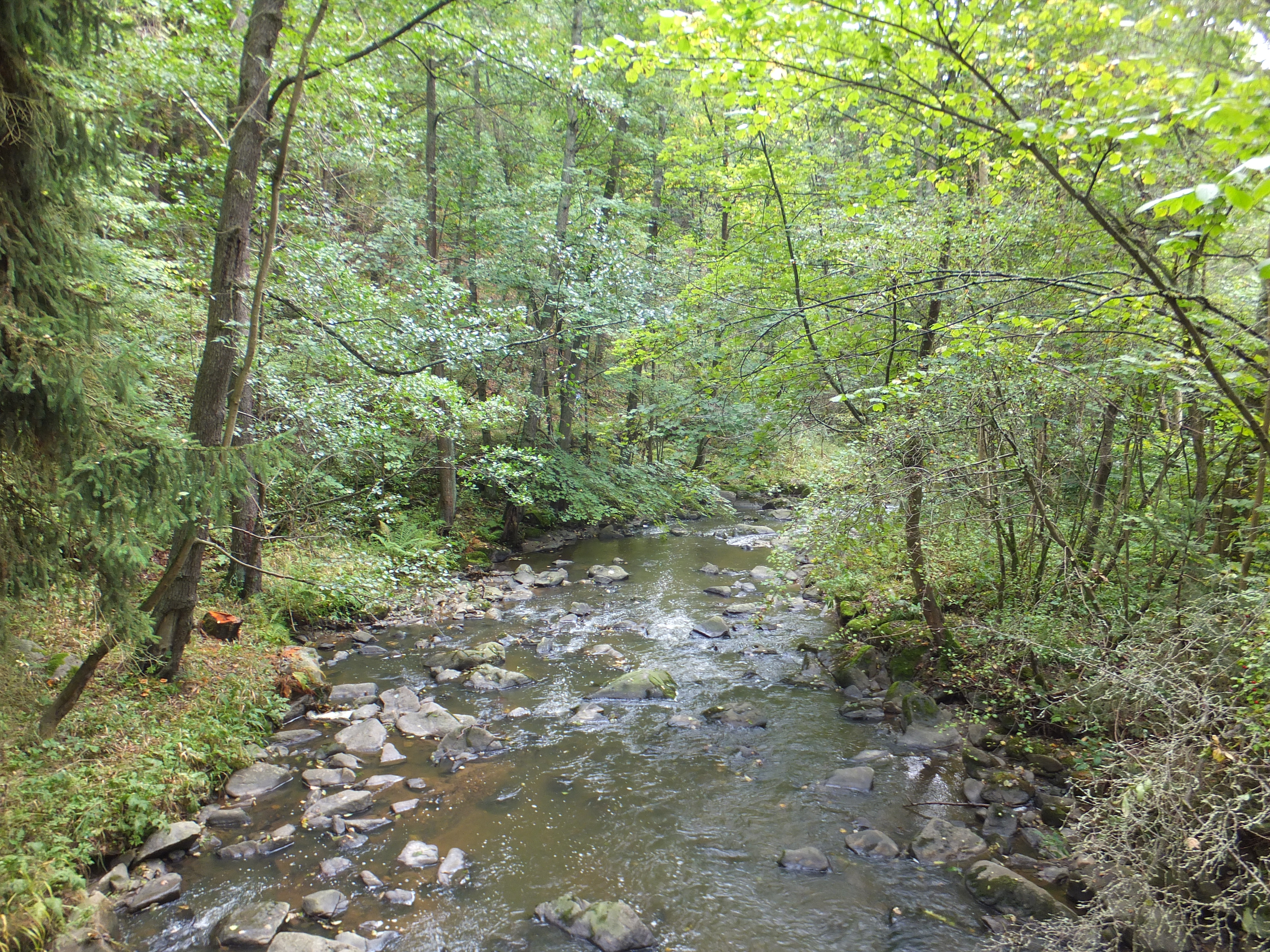
- The Kosový potok near Planá-Křínov

Location
- Country: Czech Republic
- Regions: Plzeň; Karlovy Vary

Physical characteristics
- Source
  - location: Stará Voda, Upper Palatine Forest
  - coordinates: 49°57′18″N 12°30′51″E
  - elevation: 722 m (2,369 ft)
- Mouth
  - location: Mže
  - coordinates: 49°47′56″N 12°49′53″E
  - elevation: 402 m (1,319 ft)
- Length: 46.4 km (28.8 mi)
- Basin size: 226.1 km^{2} (87.3 sq mi)
- Discharge
  - average: 1.29 m^{3}/s (46 cu ft/s) in Třebel

Basin features
- Progression: Mže→ Berounka→ Vltava→ Elbe→ North Sea

The Kosový potok (also called Kosí potok) is a stream in the Czech Republic, a left tributary of the Mže. It flows through the Plzeň and Karlovy Vary regions. It is 46.4 km (28.8 mi) long.

== Name ==
The name literally means 'blackbird stream' in Czech.

== Characteristic ==
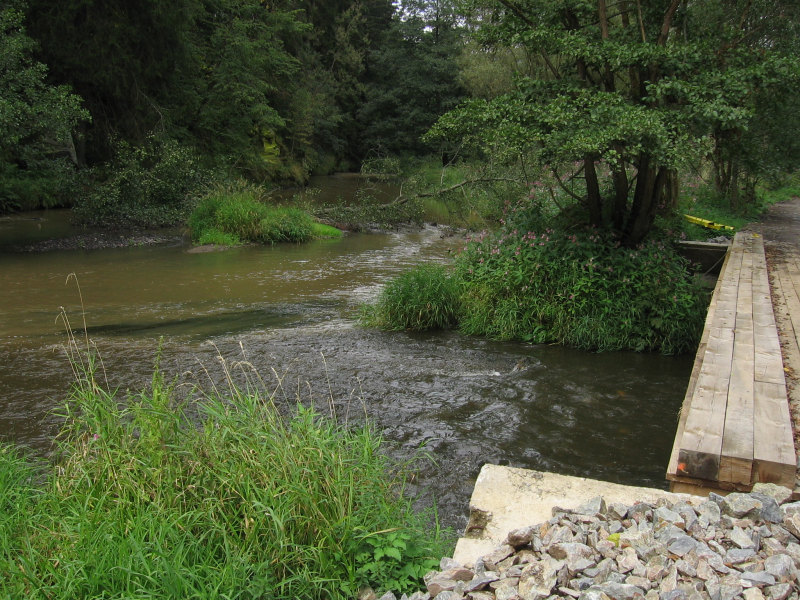
Confluence of the Kosový potok (right) and Mže

The Kosový potok originates in the territory of Stará Voda in the Upper Palatine Forest on the slope of Dyleň Mountain at an elevation of 722 m (2,369 ft) and flows to Planá, where it enters the Mže River at an elevation of 402 m (1,319 ft). It is 46.4 km (28.8 mi) long. Its drainage basin has an area of 226.1 km^{2} (87.3 sq mi). The average discharge at the 4.8 river km is 1.29 m^{3}/s (46 cu ft/s).

The longest tributaries of the Kosový potok are:

Tributary	Length (km)	Side
Úšovický potok	10.6	left
Senný potok	10.2	right
Jilmový potok	8.5	left
Bahnitý potok	8.1	left

== Course ==
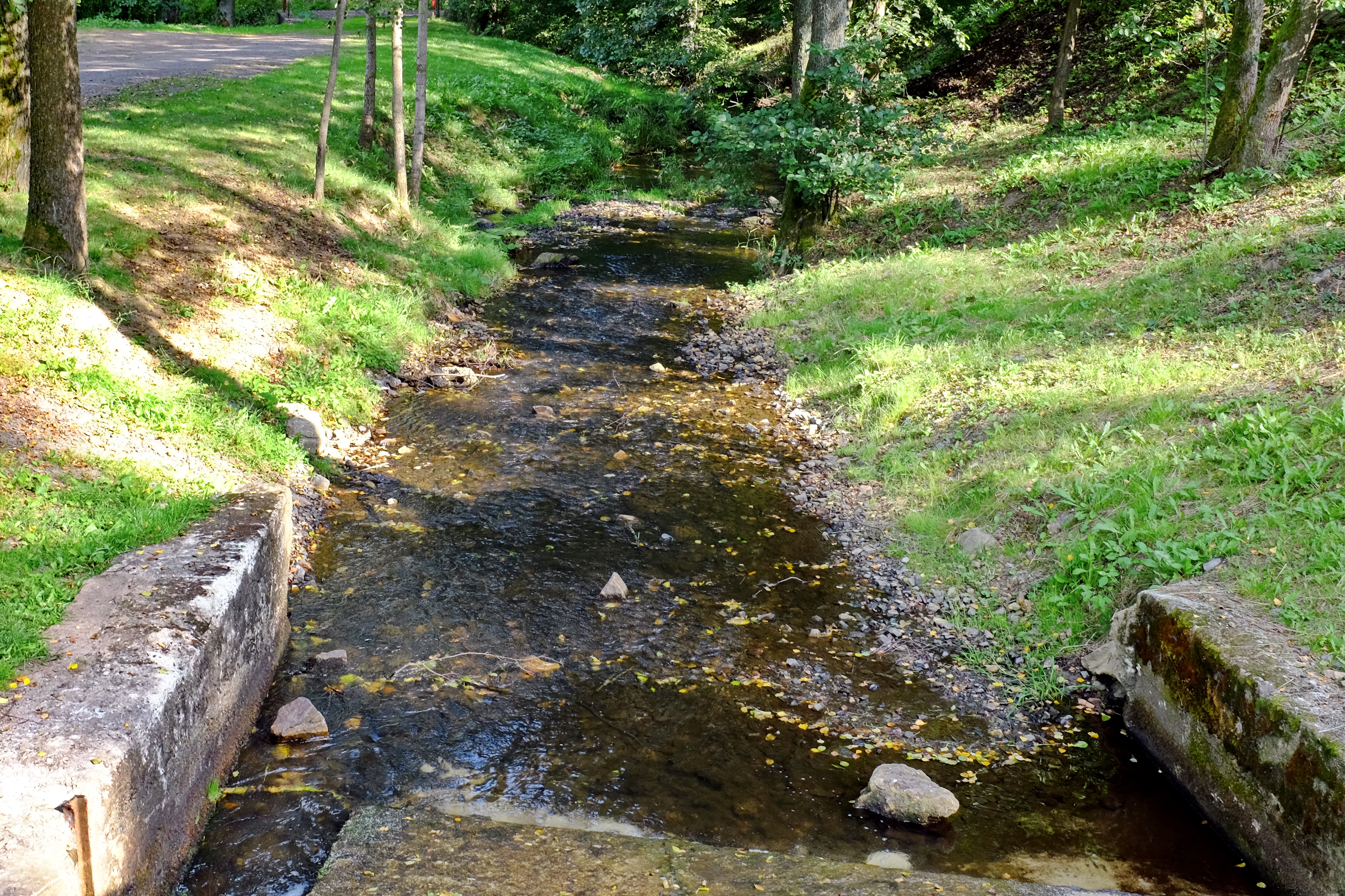
The Kosový potok in Valy

The stream flows through the municipal territories of Stará Voda, Tři Sekery, Valy, Velká Hleďsebe, Mariánské Lázně, Chodová Planá, Lestkov, Olbramov, Černošín and Planá.

== Bodies of water ==
There are 265 bodies of water in the basin area. The largest of them is the fishpond Regent with an area of 51.4 ha (127 acres), built on the Senný potok. There are no fishponds or reservoirs built directly on the Kosový potok.

== Use ==
There used to be many water mills on the stream. The existence of 35 mills is documented. Today, only ruins remain of most.

== Nature ==
The middle course of the stream flows through the protected landscape area of Slavkov Forest.

Species of animals that are endangered within the Czech Republic and live in or near the stream include the brook lamprey, European crayfish, Eurasian beaver, common kingfisher and white-throated dipper.

== Bridges ==
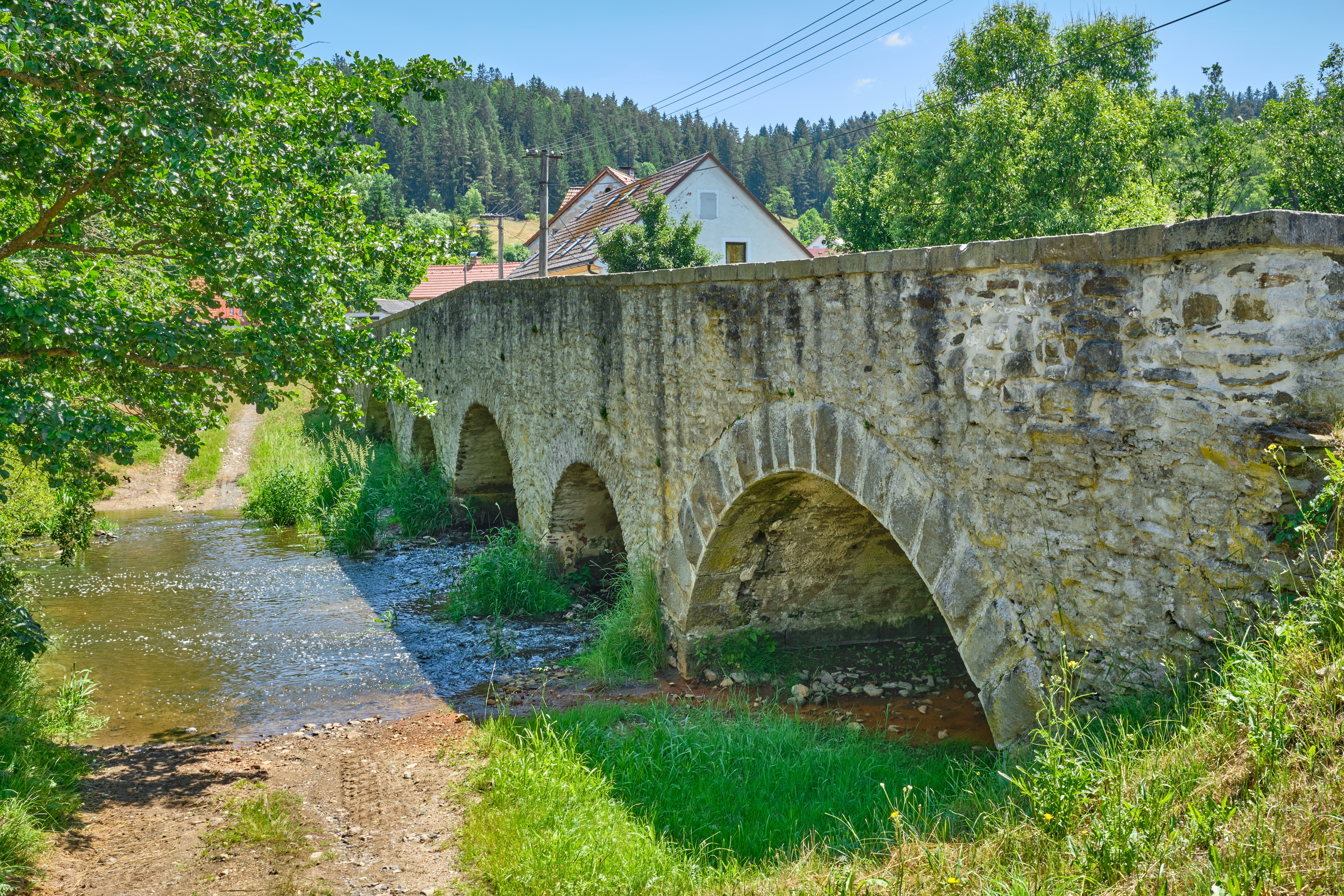
Bridge in Dolní Kramolín

In Dolní Kramolín (part of Chodová Planá), the stream is bridged by a valuable stone bridge, protected as a cultural monument. Originally built in the Baroque style in the first half of the 18th century, it was rebuilt into its present form in the 19th century.

== Tourism ==
The lower course of the stream flows through a valley with meanders, without human intervention. An 8 km (5 mi) long educational trail leads through the valley.

The Kosový potok is suitable for river tourism, but it is navigable only in spring and after heavy rains.

== See also ==
- List of rivers of the Czech Republic
