= Lázně Kynžvart =

- Town
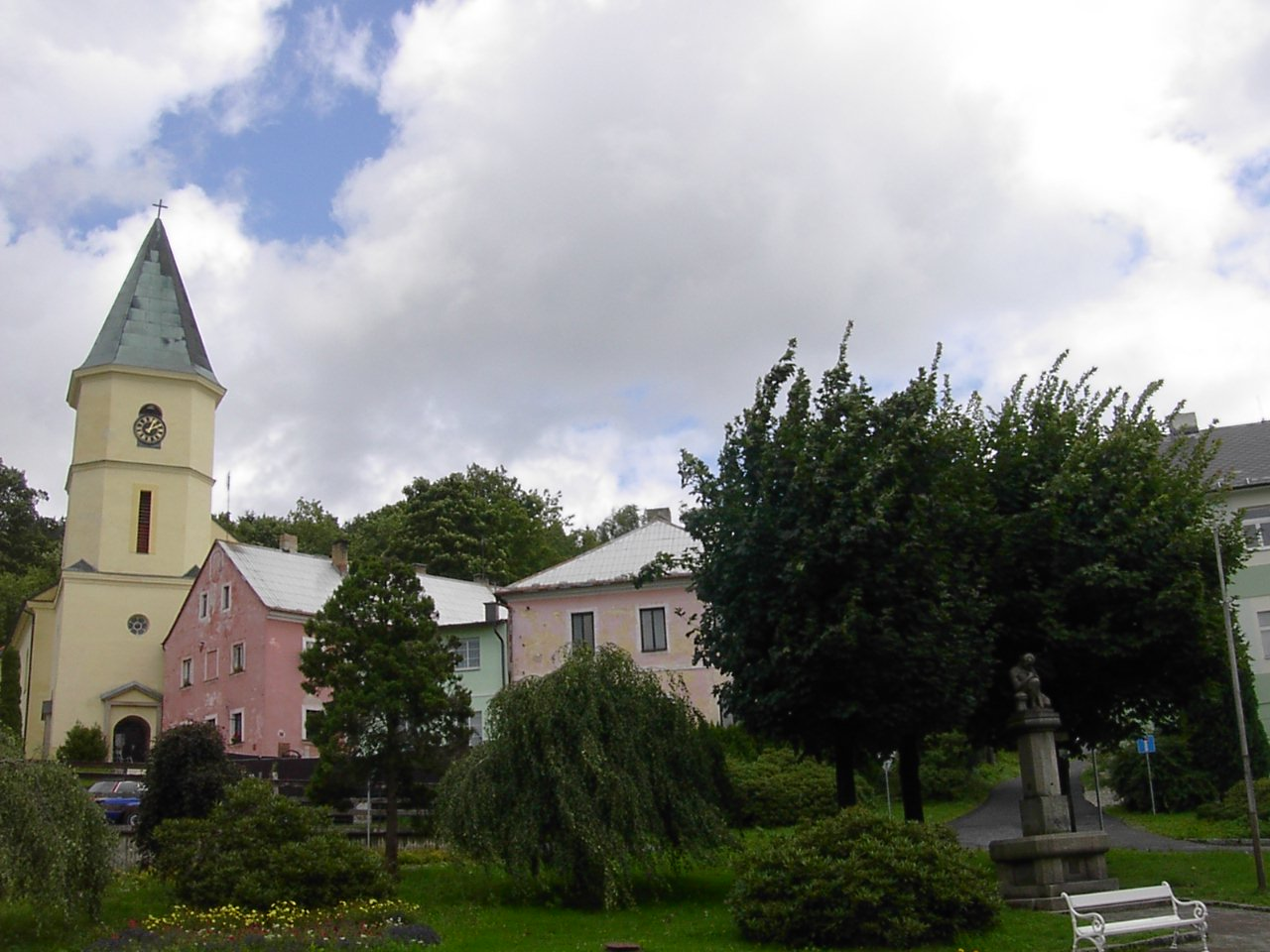
- Church of Saint Margaret in the town centre

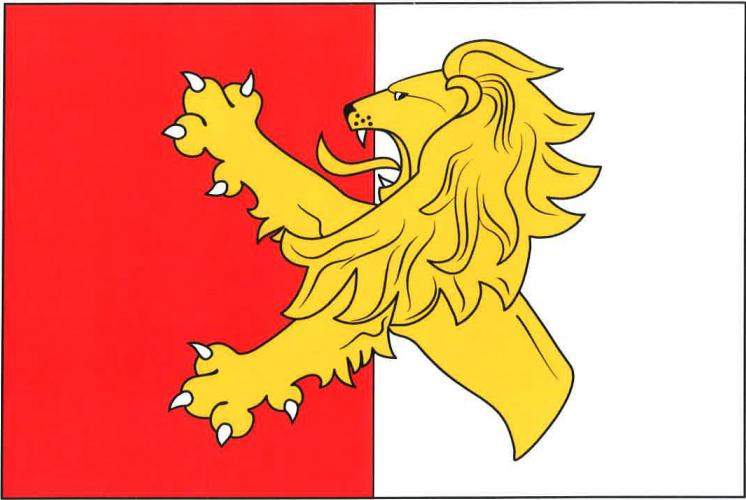
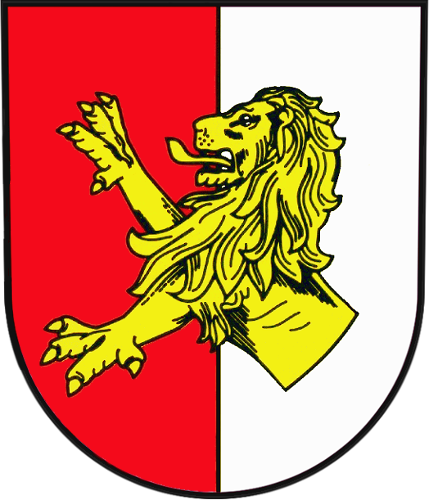
- Flag Coat of arms

- Location in the Czech Republic
- Coordinates: 50°0′39″N 12°37′29″E
- Country: Czech Republic
- Region: Karlovy Vary
- District: Cheb
- First mentioned: 972

Government
  - Mayor: Jindřich Zíval

Area
  - Total: 32.60 km^{2} (12.59 sq mi)
- Elevation: 673 m (2,208 ft)

Population (2026-01-01)
  - Total: 1,403
  - Density: 43.04/km^{2} (111.5/sq mi)
- Time zone: UTC+1 (CET)
  - Summer (DST): UTC+2 (CEST)
- Postal code: 354 91
- Website: www.laznekynzvart.cz

Lázně Kynžvart (Czech pronunciation: [ˈlaːzɲɛ ˈkɪnʒvart]; German: Bad Königswart, Königswart) is a spa town in Cheb District in the Karlovy Vary Region of the Czech Republic. It has about 1,400 inhabitants. The town is located on the border between the Podčeskoleská Hills and Slavkov Forest.

Lázně Kynžvart is famous for its sanatorium, which is designed for children with nonspecific respiratory disorders. The most important monument is the Kynžvart Castle, which is protected as a national cultural monument.

== Administrative division ==
Lázně Kynžvart consists of two municipal parts (in brackets population according to the 2021 census):

- Lázně Kynžvart (1,377)
- Lazy (16)

== Etymology ==
The German name Königswart means 'royal guard'. The Czech name Lázně Kynžvart (lit. 'spa Kynžvart') was derived from the German name.

== Geography ==
Lázně Kynžvart is located about 19 kilometres (12 mi) southeast of Cheb and 29 kilometres (18 mi) southwest of Karlovy Vary. There are several minor watercourses and several fishponds in the municipal territory. The largest fishponds are Pastevní rybník and Dvouhrázový rybník.

The southwestern part of the municipal territory lies in the Podčeskoleská Hills and the northeastern part lies in the Slavkov Forest. The highest point is at 928 m (3,045 ft) above sea level. Almost the entire territory of Lázně Kynžvart belongs to the Slavkovský les Protected Landscape Area.

== History ==
The first written mention of Lázně Kynžvart is from 972 as Castelum settlement, when it was donated by Otto I, Holy Roman Emperor to bishop Wolfgang of Regensburg. Building of the castle finished in 1287. The castle soon lost its significance, was occupied by a bunch of thieves and in 1348 was burned to the ground by order of the King Charles IV. In 1398 the castle was built once again.

In 1370, after various forms of the town's name were used, the name Königswart was established. The Czech name has been used since 1918.

The Jewish Königswarter family originate in the town.

By World War II, majority of the population were Germans. After the German-speaking inhabitants were expelled, the area was resettled by Czechs.

== Demographics ==
Historical population

Year	Pop.	±%
1869	3,050	—
1880	3,348	+9.8%
1890	3,136	−6.3%
1900	2,966	−5.4%
1910	2,925	−1.4%

Year	Pop.	±%
1921	2,616	−10.6%
1930	2,675	+2.3%
1950	1,513	−43.4%
1961	1,221	−19.3%
1970	1,368	+12.0%

Year	Pop.	±%
1980	1,468	+7.3%
1991	1,655	+12.7%
2001	1,620	−2.1%
2011	1,443	−10.9%
2021	1,393	−3.5%

Source: Censuses

== Spa ==
The first mention of springs is from 1454. The spa was founded by the Metternich family, which owned the town's castle.

In 1822, Count Richard Metternich built a spa and six springs around the area. The area shortly became more popular after the spa was built. In 1872, a railway was built, which helped the growth of the spa and the town.

After 1950, during the whooping cough epidemic, children were treated in the spa. Since then, only children were treated in the spa. In 2013, treatment was again extended to adult patients.

== Transport ==
The main railway line Prague–Cheb via Plzeň passes through Lázně Kynžvart. However, the train station named Lázně Kynžvart is located just outside the municipal territory, in neighbouring Stará Voda.

== Sport ==
The town is home to the handball club Házená Kynžvart, playing in the Czech-Slovak Women Handball International League. It was founded in 1970.

== Sights ==
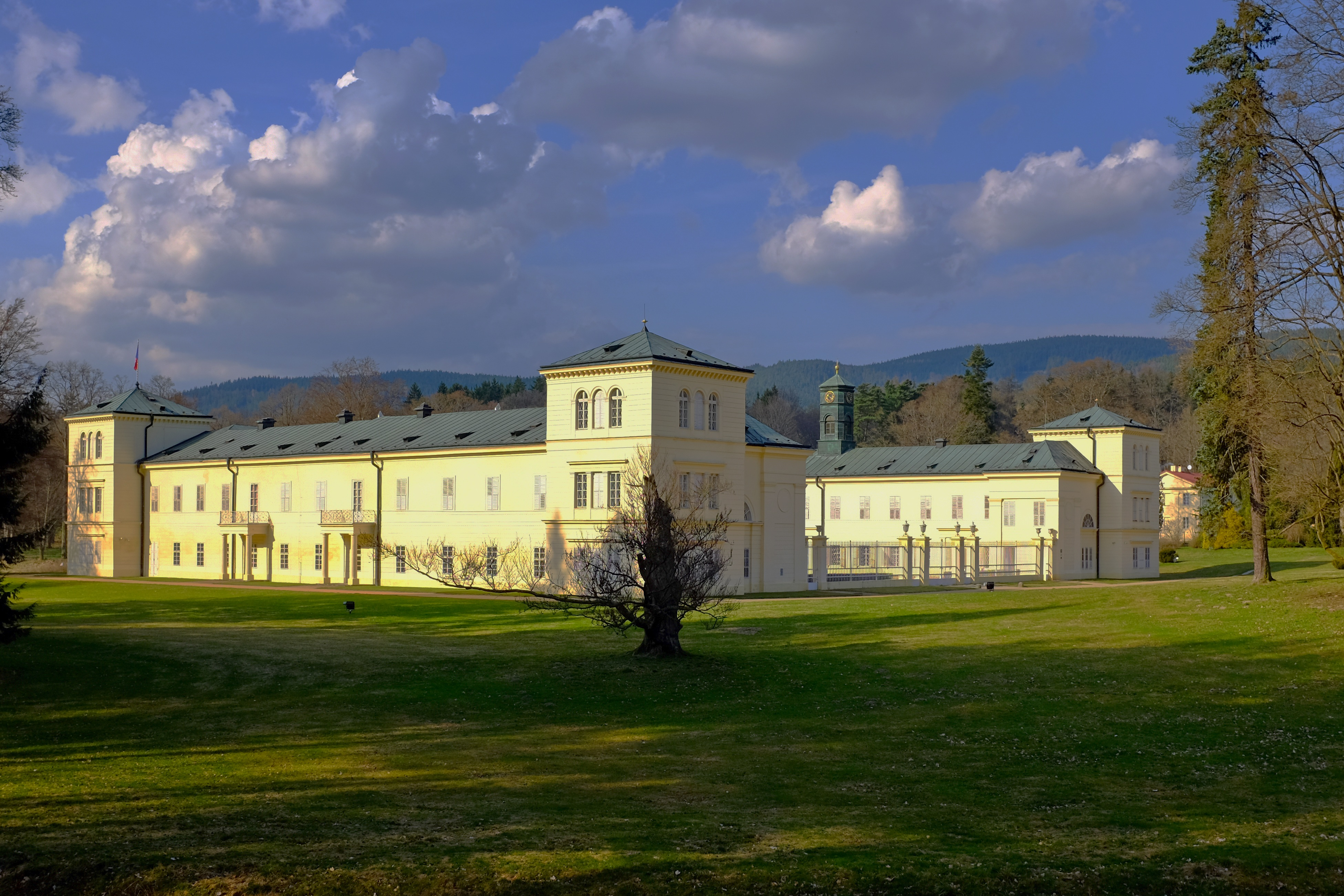
Kynžvart Castle

The most important monument is the Kynžvart Castle, which protected as a national cultural monument. It was built in the Renaissance style in 1597 and rebuilt at the end of the 17th century. It 1821–1839, it was rebuilt into its current form by the architect Pietro Nobile, in the style of Viennese Neoclassicism. Today the castle is owned by the state and offers guided tours. The castle's collections include the Kynžvart Daguerreotype, which is protected as a separate national cultural monument. Next to the castle is one of the largest English landscape gardens in the Czech Republic with an area of 293 ha (720 acres).

The main landmark of the town centre is the Church of Saint Margaret. It was originally a Gothic medieval building, which was completely rebuilt in 1870, after it was damaged by a fire.

A notable architectural monument is the spa house called New York. Originally a two-storey house from the second half of the 17th century, it was extended and rebuilt in the late Baroque style in 1770. Today the house is unused.

== Notable people ==
- Franz Johann Habermann (1706–1783), composer and musician
- Klemens von Metternich (1773–1859), Austrian diplomat and nobleman; owned the castle and stayed there

== Twin towns – sister cities ==
Lázně Kynžvart is twinned with:

- Bad Bocklet, Germany
