= Stará Voda (Cheb District) =

- Municipality
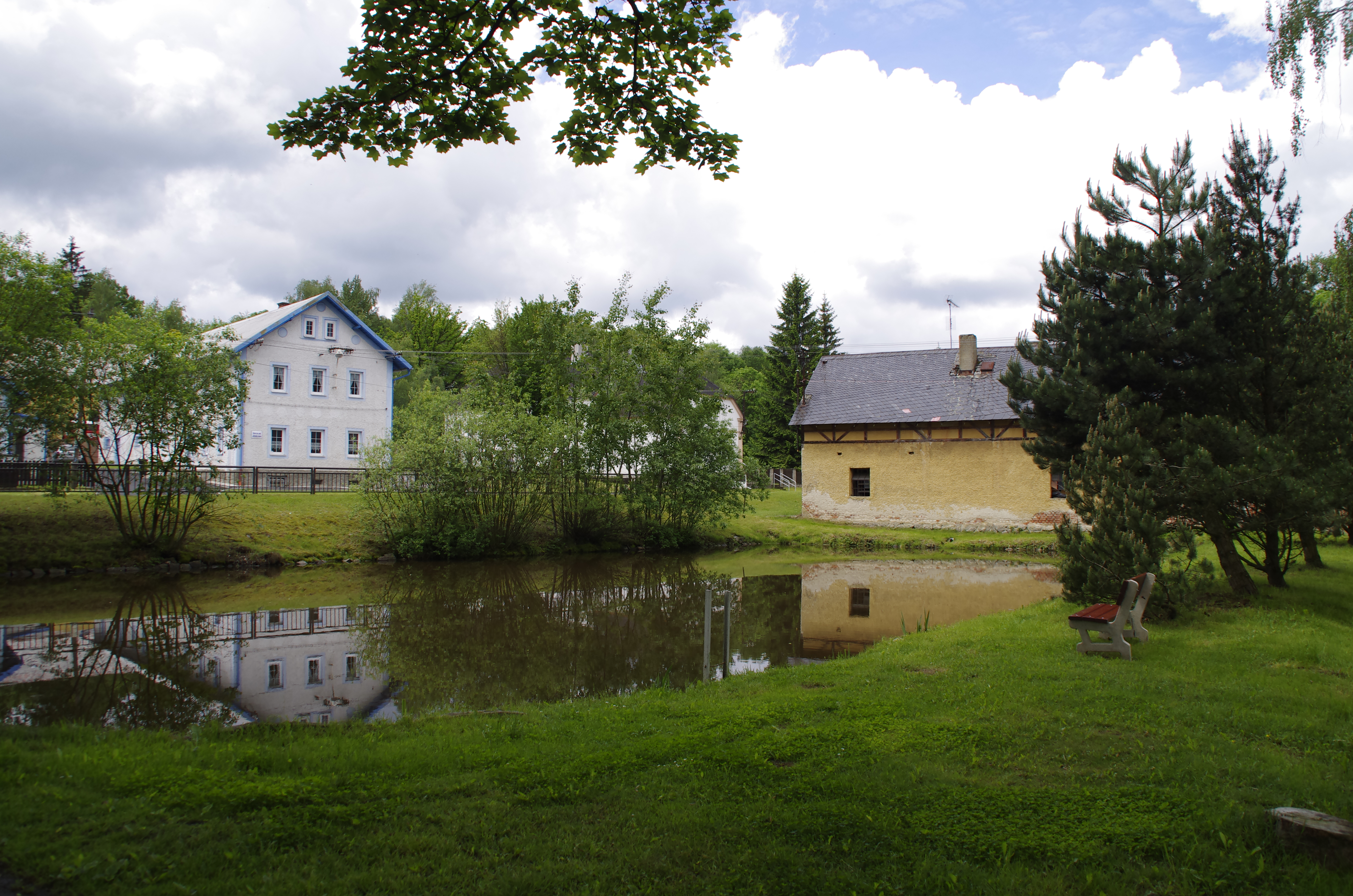
- A pond in the centre

- Flag Coat of arms

- Location in the Czech Republic
- Coordinates: 49°59′30″N 12°35′45″E
- Country: Czech Republic
- Region: Karlovy Vary
- District: Cheb
- First mentioned: 1380

Area
  - Total: 54.01 km^{2} (20.85 sq mi)
- Elevation: 605 m (1,985 ft)

Population (2026-01-01)
  - Total: 494
  - Density: 9.15/km^{2} (23.7/sq mi)
- Time zone: UTC+1 (CET)
  - Summer (DST): UTC+2 (CEST)
- Postal codes: 350 02, 353 01
- Website: www.staravoda.cz

Stará Voda (German: Altwasser) is a municipality and village in Cheb District in the Karlovy Vary Region of the Czech Republic. It has about 500 inhabitants.

== Administrative division ==
Stará Voda consists of three municipal parts (in brackets population according to the 2021 census):

- Stará Voda (323)
- Sekerské Chalupy (115)
- Vysoká (25)

== Etymology ==
Both the Czech name Stará Voda and the historical German name Altwasser mean 'old water'.

== Geography ==
Stará Voda is located about 17 kilometres (11 mi) southeast of Cheb and 32 km (20 mi) southwest of Karlovy Vary, on the border with Germany. The eastern part of the municipal territory with the village of Stará Voda lies in the Podčeskoleská Hills, but most of the municipality lies in the Upper Palatine Forest. The highest point is the second highest peak of the entire Upper Palatine Forest, Dyleň at 940 m (3,084 ft) above sea level.

The streams Kosový potok and Hamerský potok, which are notable tributaries of the Mže River, originate in the southwestern part of the municipal territory. The Wondreb River (here known as Mikulášský potok) also originates near the Czech–German border, but then it soon enters Germany.

== History ==
The first written mention of Stará Voda is from 1380.

== Demographics ==
Historical population

Year	Pop.	±%
1869	2,564	—
1880	2,683	+4.6%
1890	2,458	−8.4%
1900	2,404	−2.2%
1910	2,387	−0.7%

Year	Pop.	±%
1921	2,382	−0.2%
1930	2,293	−3.7%
1950	671	−70.7%
1961	637	−5.1%
1970	504	−20.9%

Year	Pop.	±%
1980	397	−21.2%
1991	350	−11.8%
2001	444	+26.9%
2011	458	+3.2%
2021	463	+1.1%

Source: Censuses

== Transport ==
The I/21 road, which connects the D5 and D6 motorways, runs through the municipality.

The main railway line Prague–Cheb via Plzeň passes through the municipal territory. The train station named Lázně Kynžvart, which serves mainly the neighbouring town of Lázně Kynžvart, is located in the territory of Stará Voda.

== Sights ==
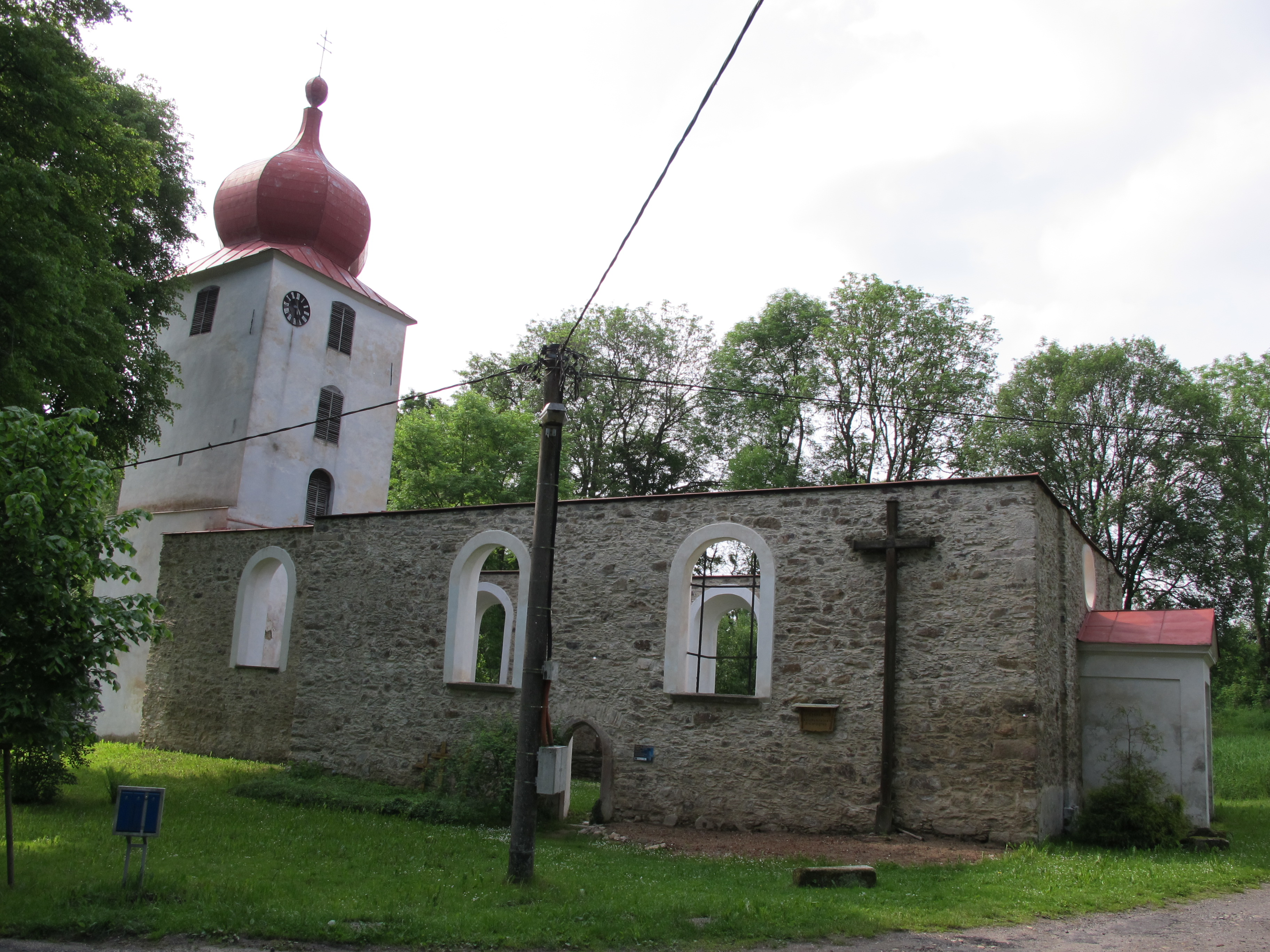
Church of Saint John the Baptist

The main landmark of the municipality is the Church of Saint John the Baptist in Vysoká. It was originally a Romanesque-Gothic building from the mid-13th century. It was gradually rebuilt and modified until 1847. In 1982, the roof was taken off and only the tower was preserved.
