= Černošín =

- Town
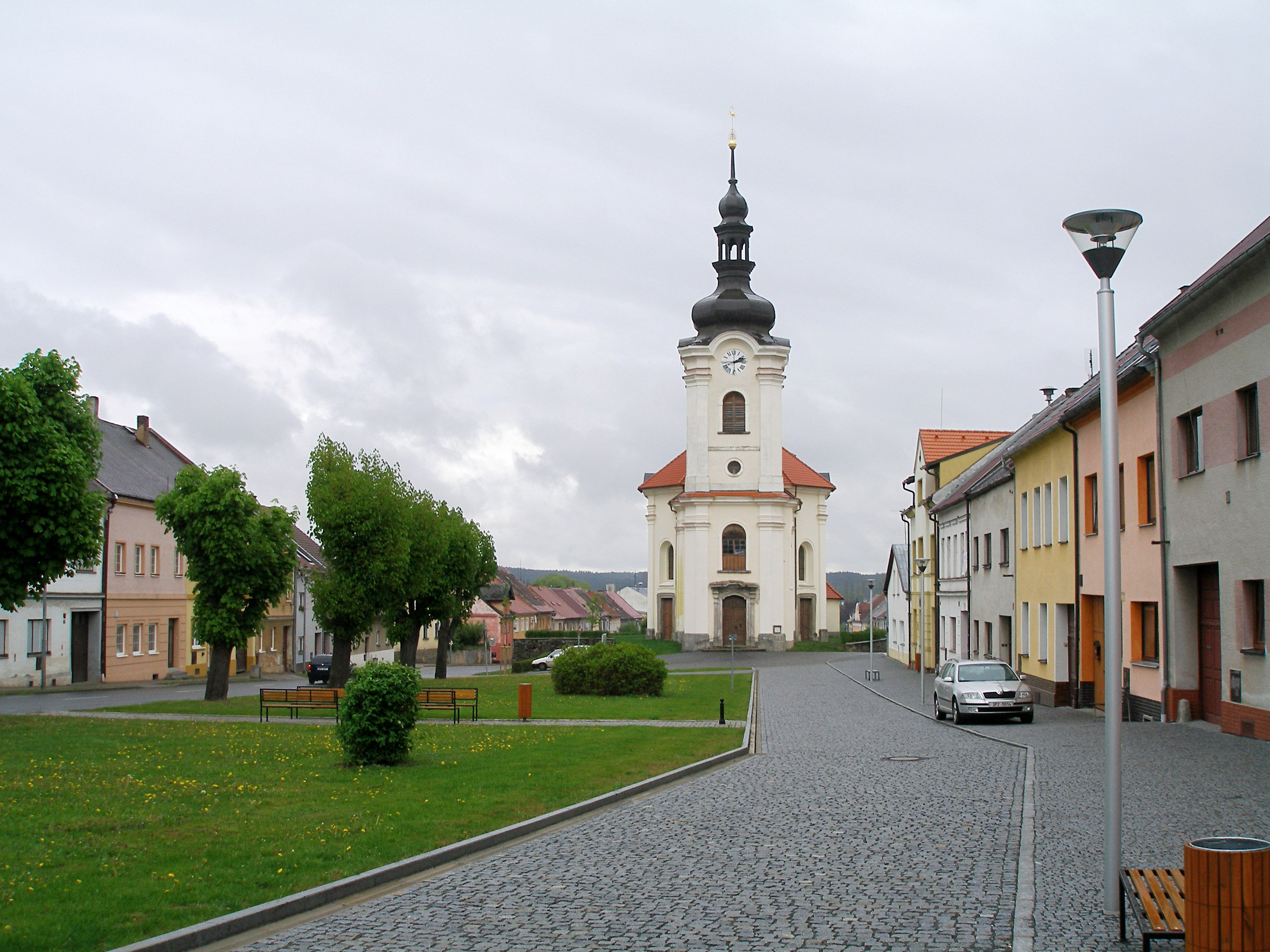
- Town square with the Church of Saint George

- Flag Coat of arms

- Location in the Czech Republic
- Coordinates: 49°49′8″N 12°52′56″E
- Country: Czech Republic
- Region: Plzeň
- District: Tachov
- First mentioned: 1155

Government
  - Mayor: Vladimír Krejča

Area
  - Total: 42.21 km^{2} (16.30 sq mi)
- Elevation: 500 m (1,600 ft)

Population (2026-01-01)
  - Total: 1,193
  - Density: 28.26/km^{2} (73.20/sq mi)
- Time zone: UTC+1 (CET)
  - Summer (DST): UTC+2 (CEST)
- Postal codes: 349 01, 349 58
- Website: www.cernosin.cz

Černošín (Czech pronunciation: [ˈtʃɛrnoʃiːn]; German: Tschernoschin) is a town in Tachov District in the Plzeň Region of the Czech Republic. It has about 1,200 inhabitants. The town is located on the stream Černošínský potok in the Plasy Uplands. The main landmark of Černošín is the Church of Saint George.

== Administrative division ==
Černošín consists of nine municipal parts (in brackets population according to the 2021 census):

- Černošín (897)
- Krásné Údolí (45)
- Lažany (10)
- Lhota (0)
- Ostrovce (34)
- Pytlov (23)
- Třebel (26)
- Víchov (91)
- Záhoří (5)

== Etymology ==
The name Černošín is derived from the personal name Černoš or Černoch, meaning "Černoš's/Černoch's (court)". It was probably a local lord.

== Geography ==
Černošín is located about 18 kilometres (11 mi) east of Tachov and 36 km (22 mi) west of Plzeň. It lies in the Plasy Uplands. The highest point is the hill Vlčí hora at 704 m (2,310 ft) above sea level. The stream Černošínský potok flows through the town proper. The Mže River flows along the southern municipal border. Its tributary, the stream Kosový potok, forms the western municipal border near Třebel and Záhoří, before it merges with the Mže just outside the territory of Černošín.

== History ==
The first written mention of Černošín is from 1155, but this document has not been preserved. The next mention of Černošín is from 1290. From the 14th to the 17th century, it was owned by the Schwamberg family. In 1541, Černošín was promoted to a town. After the town obtained various rights and privileges in 1551, it became an important trade and craft centre. The development was stopped by the Thirty Years' War, during which the town was heavily damaged and depopulated. In the middle of the 17th century, the town received new privileges and was resettled by German immigrants.

== Demographics ==
Historical population

Year	Pop.	±%
1869	2,539	—
1880	2,665	+5.0%
1890	2,723	+2.2%
1900	2,777	+2.0%
1910	2,785	+0.3%

Year	Pop.	±%
1921	2,845	+2.2%
1930	2,722	−4.3%
1950	1,361	−50.0%
1961	1,412	+3.7%
1970	1,349	−4.5%

Year	Pop.	±%
1980	1,296	−3.9%
1991	1,117	−13.8%
2001	1,055	−5.6%
2011	1,124	+6.5%
2021	1,131	+0.6%

Source: Censuses

== Transport ==
The Plzeň–Karlovy Vary railway briefly crosses the municipal territory in the south, but there is no train station. The town is served by the station in Svojšín.

== Sights ==
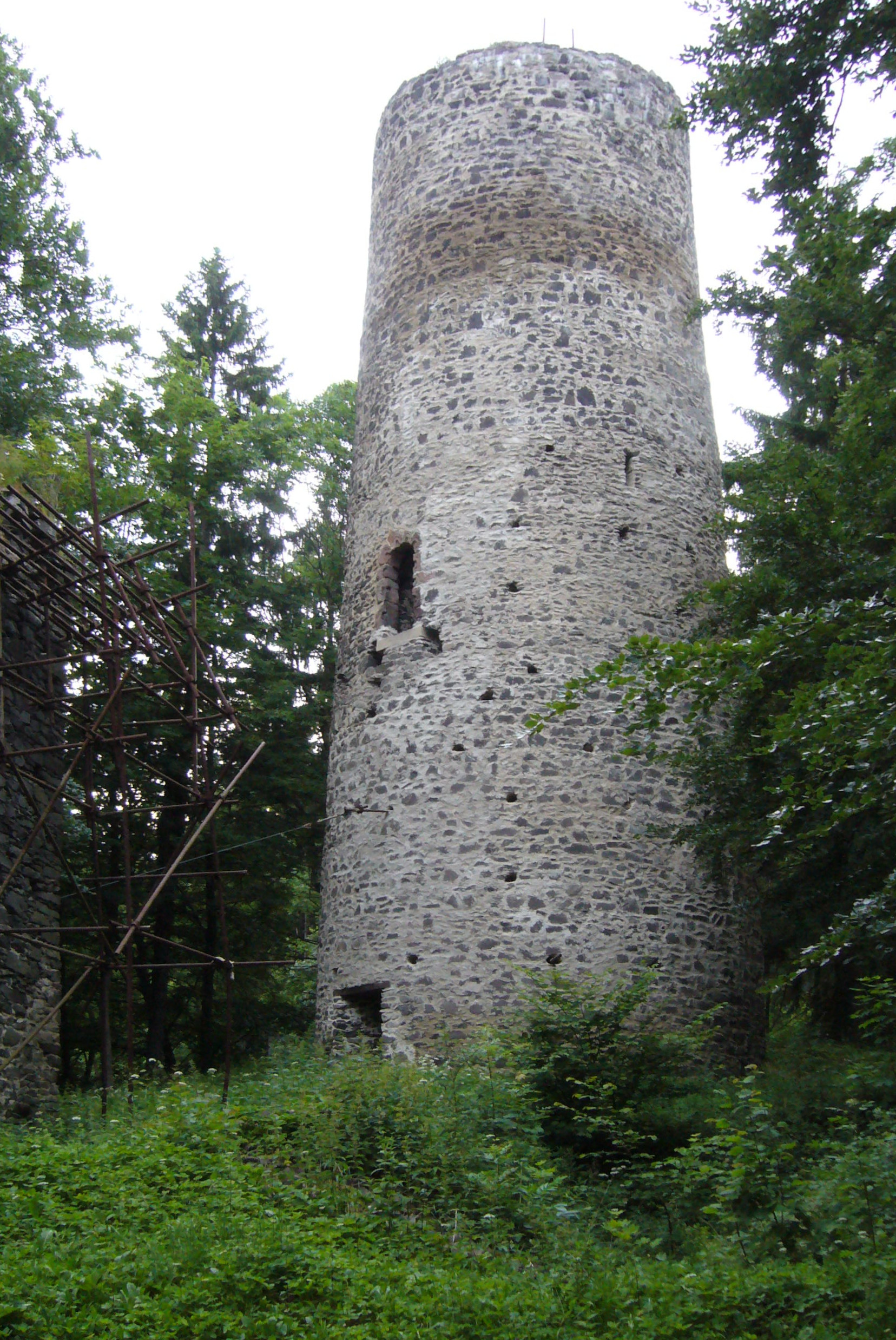
Tower of the Volfštejn Castle

The main landmark of Černošín is the Church of Saint George. It was built in the Baroque style in 1711–1736, on the site of an old Gothic church from the 14th century.

A tourist destination is the ruin of the Volfštejn Castle, located in the woods at the foot of Vlčí hora. It was built in the middle of the 13th century, the first written mention dates from 1316. It was destroyed during the battles of King George of Poděbrady with the opposition in 1470. The best-preserved part is the bergfried with a Romanesque arched portal. Today the ruin is freely accessible.

== Twin towns – sister cities ==
Černošín is twinned with:

- Pullenreuth, Germany
