= Bor (Tachov District) =

Town in the Czech Republic

- Town
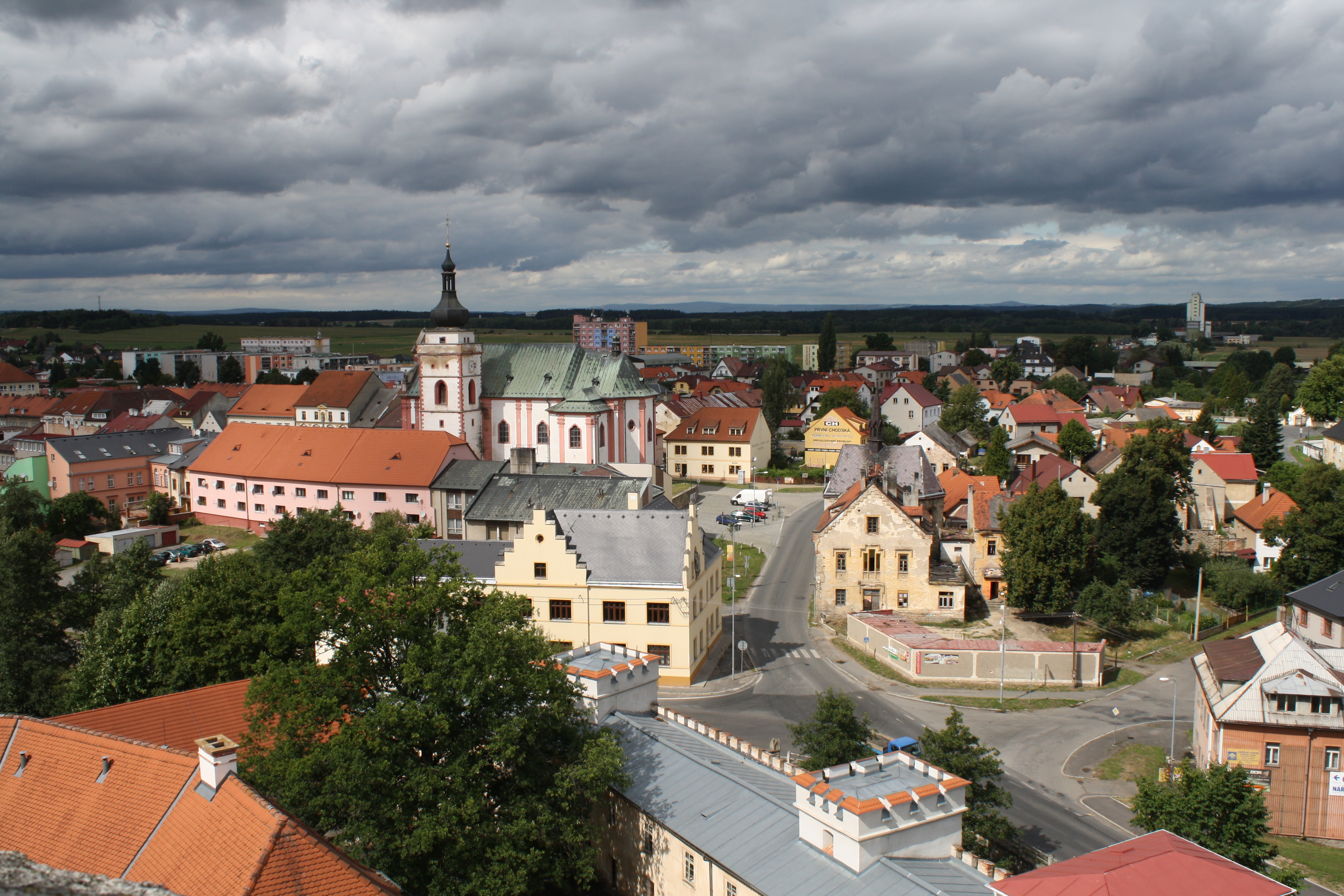
- Town panorama

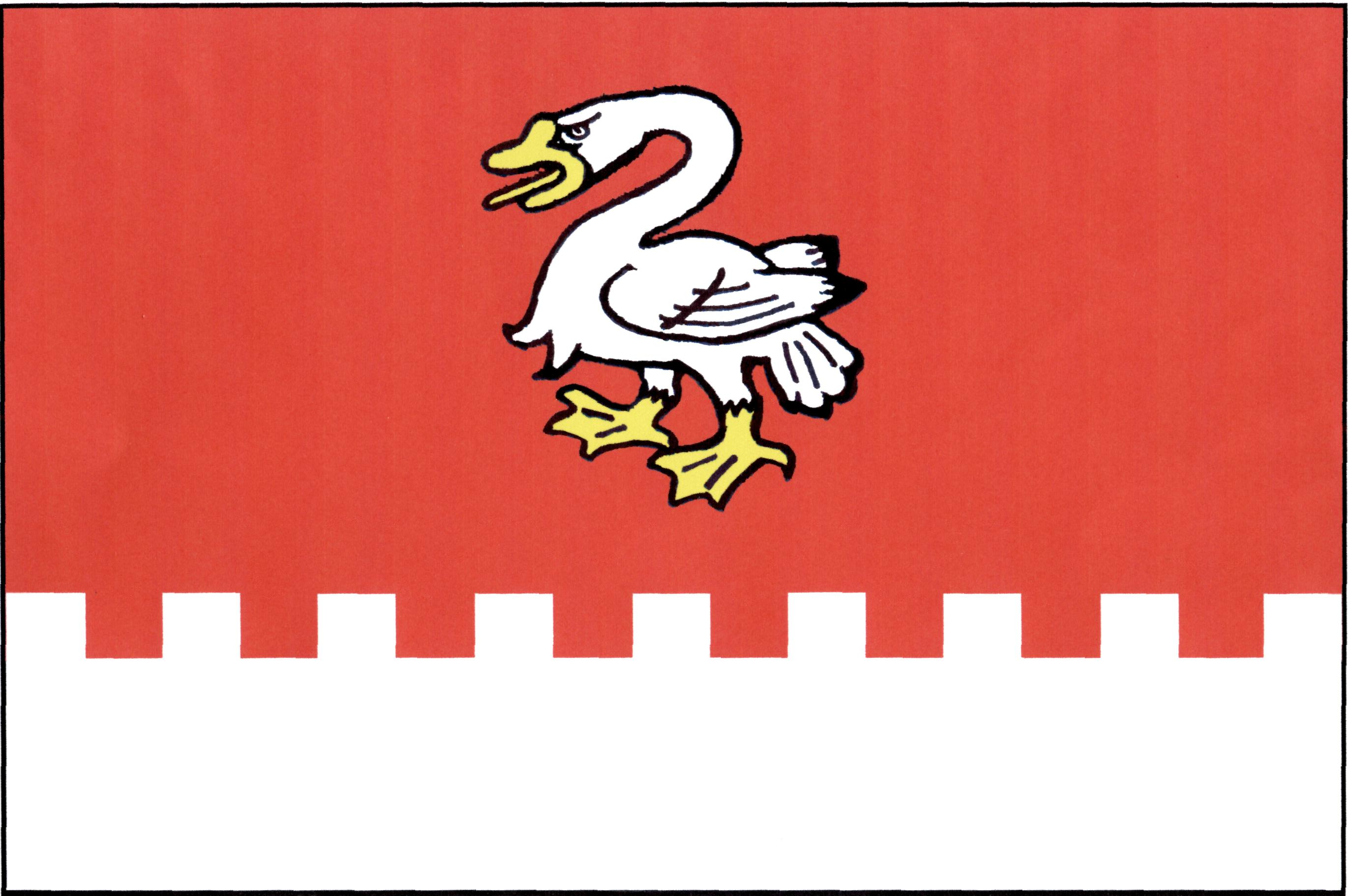
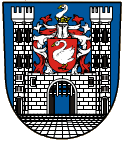
- Flag Coat of arms

- Location in the Czech Republic
- Coordinates: 49°42′44″N 12°46′25″E
- Country: Czech Republic
- Region: Plzeň
- District: Tachov
- First mentioned: 1263

Government
  - Mayor: Rudolf Kodalík

Area
  - Total: 116.49 km^{2} (44.98 sq mi)
- Elevation: 472 m (1,549 ft)

Population (2026-01-01)
  - Total: 4,824
  - Density: 41.41/km^{2} (107.3/sq mi)
- Time zone: UTC+1 (CET)
  - Summer (DST): UTC+2 (CEST)
- Postal code: 348 02
- Website: www.mubor.cz

Bor (Czech pronunciation: [ˈbor]; German: Haid) is a town in Tachov District in the Plzeň Region of the Czech Republic. It has about 4,800 inhabitants. The town is located on the stream Výrovský potok in the Podčeskoleská Hills. Bor is an industrial town, which is home to two large producers of automotive parts.

The historic town centre is well preserved and is protected as an urban monument zone. The main landmark of Bor is the neo-Gothic Bor Castle.

== Administrative division ==
Bor consists of 22 municipal parts (in brackets population according to the 2021 census):

- Bor (2,572)
- Bezděkov (11)
- Boječnice (50)
- Borovany (86)
- Čečkovice (67)
- Damnov (187)
- Doly (69)
- Hlupenov (4)
- Holostřevy (151)
- Kosov (36)
- Kurojedy (104)
- Lhota (19)
- Lužná (38)
- Málkovice (27)
- Malovice (14)
- Muckov (5)
- Nová Hospoda (204)
- Nový Dvůr (39)
- Ostrov (37)
- Skviřín (89)
- Velká Ves (7)
- Vysočany (485)

== Etymology ==
The name literally means 'pine forest'. The settlement was founded near a pine forest or on the site where pine forest was cut down.

== Geography ==
Bor is located about 14 kilometres (9 mi) southeast of Tachov and 42 km (26 mi) west of Plzeň. It lies in the Podčeskoleská Hills. The highest point is the hill Malovický vrch at 586 m (1,923 ft) above sea level. The stream Výrovský potok flows through the town proper and the Úhlavka River briefly flows along the southern municipal border. The territory of Bor is rich in fishponds and small streams.

== History ==
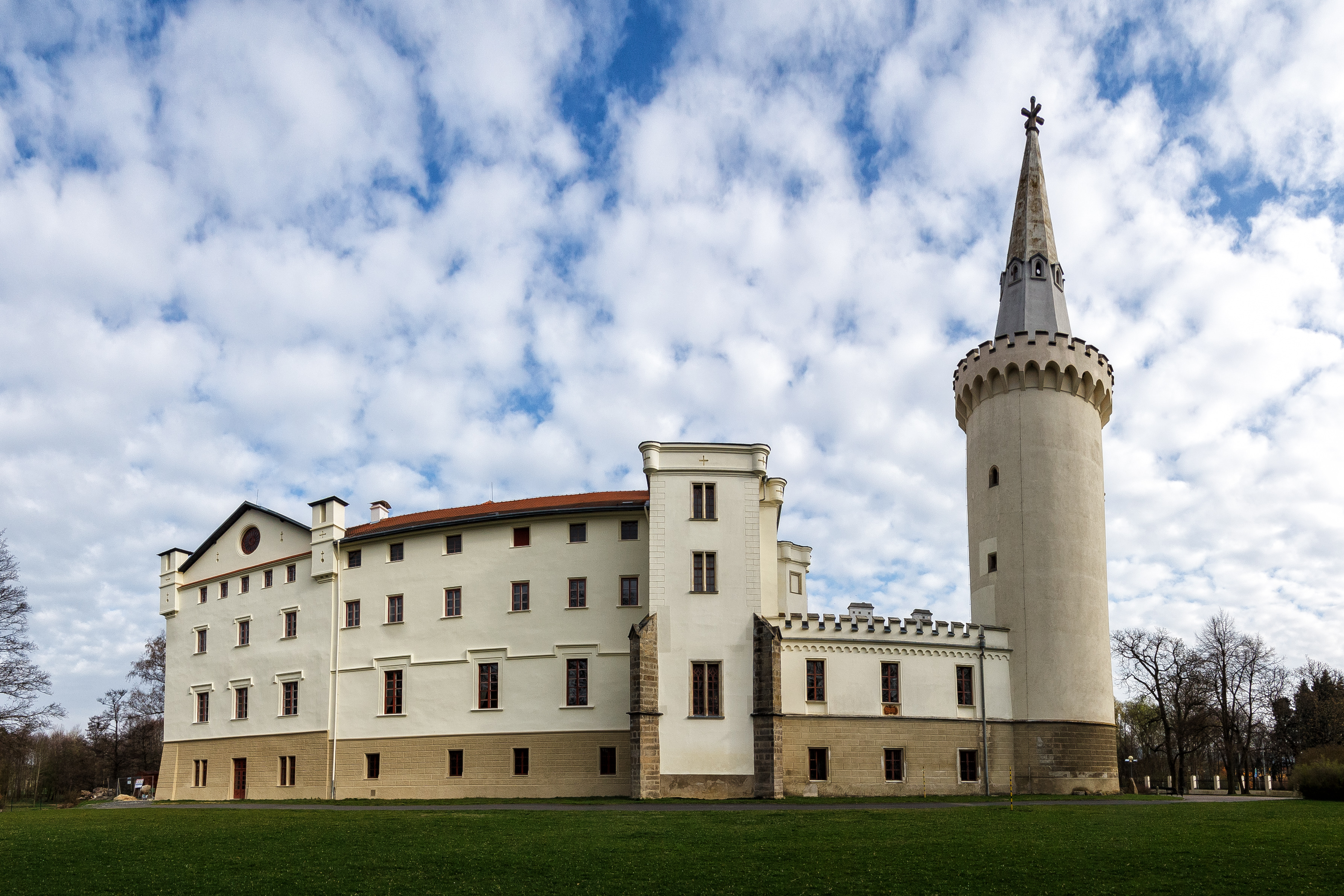
Bor Castle

The first written mention of Bor is from 1263, when its location by a water castle is documented. After the settlement was looted in 1318, the walls were built. In 1369, Bor gained town privileges.

Only three noble families took turns in ownership of Bor. Until 1650, the town was held by the Lords of Bor, later known as the Schwamberg family. From 1650 to 1720, it was owned by the Lords of Götzen. Since 1720, it was continuously owned by the Löwenstein family. During their rule, Bor was the centre of a large estate.

From 1938 to 1945, Bor was annexed by Nazi Germany and administered as part of the Reichsgau Sudetenland. After World War II, the German population was expelled.

== Demographics ==
Historical population

Year	Pop.	±%
1869	5,181	—
1880	5,590	+7.9%
1890	5,422	−3.0%
1900	5,292	−2.4%
1910	5,398	+2.0%

Year	Pop.	±%
1921	5,401	+0.1%
1930	5,229	−3.2%
1950	2,970	−43.2%
1961	3,460	+16.5%
1970	3,416	−1.3%

Year	Pop.	±%
1980	3,832	+12.2%
1991	3,787	−1.2%
2001	3,961	+4.6%
2011	4,140	+4.5%
2021	4,301	+3.9%

Source: Censuses

== Economy ==
Bor is home to two large producers of automotive parts that are among the most important employers in the region. Ideal Automotive s.r.o., a Czech branch of German company Ideal Automotive GmbH founded in 1999, is a manufacturer of textile parts for cars with more than 1,000 employers. Adient company specialises in the assembly of car seats and its factory in Bor has about 800 employees.

== Transport ==
The D5 motorway (part of the European route E50) from Plzeň to the Czech–German border passes through the territory, north of the town proper.

Bor is located on the railway line Planá–Domažlice.

== Sights ==
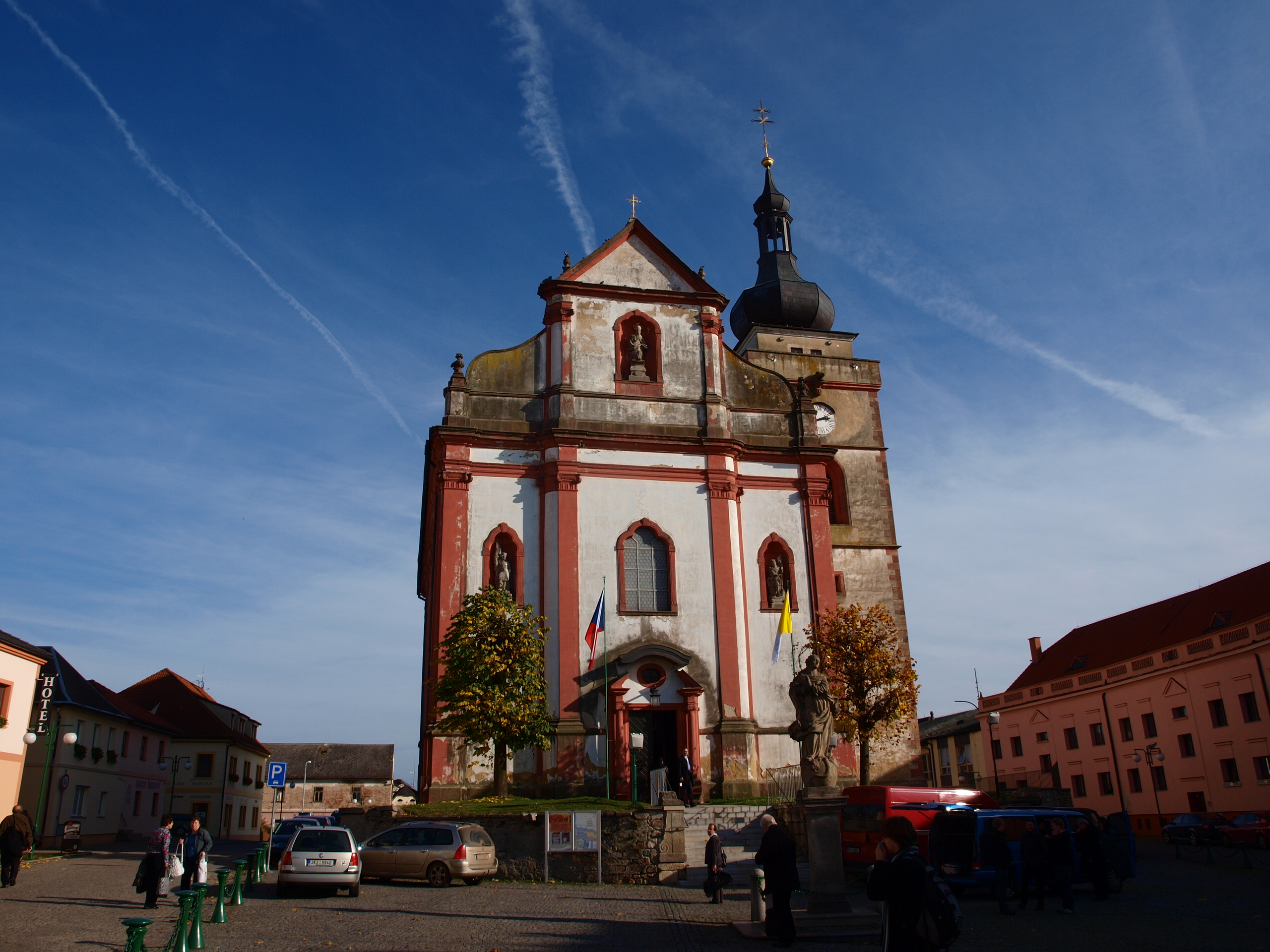
Church of Saint Nicholas

Bor is known for the Bor Castle. The old water castle was rebuilt into an aristocratic residence in the 16th century. In the 19th century, it was rebuilt to its present neo-Gothic form. The cylindrical tower remains of the original water castle, and today is the dominant feature of the town. The castle is open to the public and offers guided tours.

The Church of Saint Nicholas is the main landmark of the town square. It was first mentioned in 1282. It was rebuilt in the 14th–16th centuries and after a big fire in 1647, it was once again rebuilt, this time in the Baroque style. It has a late Gothic prismatic tower.

== Notable people ==
- Charles, 6th Prince of Löwenstein-Wertheim-Rosenberg (1834–1921), German nobleman and politician
- Gerhard Wagner (born 1945), German-American physicist

== Twin towns – sister cities ==
Bor is twinned with:

- Pleystein, Germany
- Wernberg-Köblitz, Germany
