= Hamerský potok (Mže) =

Stream in the Czech Republic and Germany

Hamerský potok Hammerbach
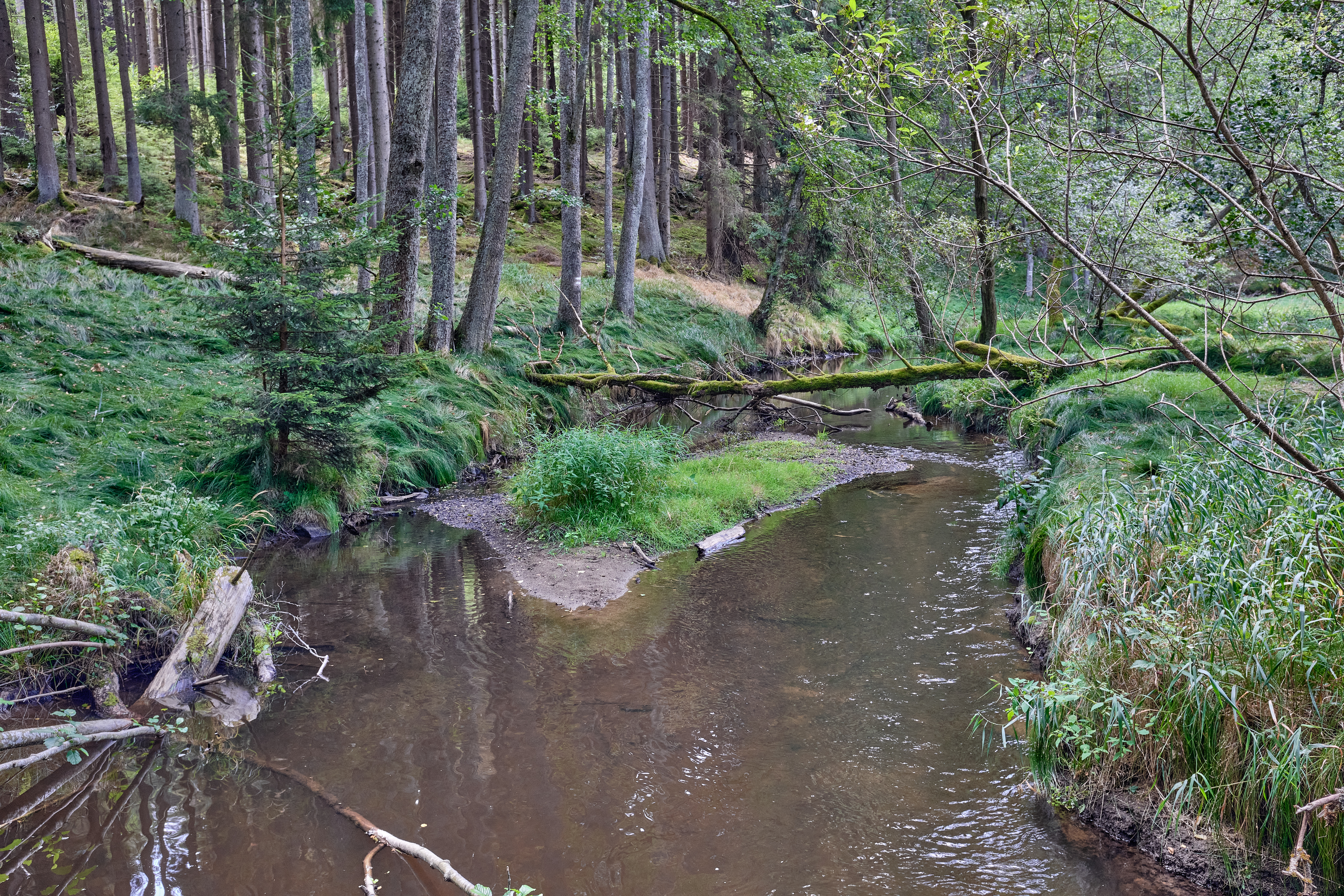
- The Hamerský potok in Broumov

Location
- Countries: Czech Republic; Germany
- Regions/ States: Plzeň; Karlovy Vary; Bavaria

Physical characteristics
- Source
  - location: Stará Voda, Upper Palatine Forest
  - coordinates: 49°56′49″N 12°30′4″E
  - elevation: 754 m (2,474 ft)
- Mouth
  - location: Mže
  - coordinates: 49°48′49″N 12°45′46″E
  - elevation: 442 m (1,450 ft)
- Length: 33.8 km (21.0 mi)
- Basin size: 197.0 km^{2} (76.1 sq mi)
- Discharge
  - average: 1.46 m^{3}/s (52 cu ft/s) near estuary

Basin features
- Progression: Mže→ Berounka→ Vltava→ Elbe→ North Sea

The Hamerský potok (German: Hammerbach) is a stream in the Czech Republic and Germany, a left tributary of the Mže. It flows mostly through the Plzeň Region in the Czech Republic and briefly also through Bavaria in Germany. It is 33.8 km (21.0 mi) long.

== Name ==
The name is derived from hammer mills that existed here. In the lower course, the stream was also called Tichá (i.e. 'silent'), referring to its character. Today Tichá is the name of a brook, which is a tributary of the Hamerský potok in its upper course.

== Characteristic ==
The Hamerský potok originates in the territory of Stará Voda in the Upper Palatine Forest at an elevation of 754 m (2,474 ft) and flows to Kočov, where it merges with the Mže River at an elevation of 442 m (1,450 ft). It is 33.8 km (21.0 mi) long, of which 29.3 km (18.2 mi) is in the Czech Republic. Its drainage basin has an area of 197.0 km^{2} (76.1 sq mi), of which 177.9 km^{2} (68.7 sq mi) is in the Czech Republic.

The longest tributaries of the Hamerský potok are:

Tributary	Length (km)	Side
Slatinný potok	12.8	right
Tichá	10.7	left
Huťský potok	9.3	left

== Course ==
The Hamerský potok originates in the Czech Republic, flows through Germany between its 25.3 and 29.8 river kilometre, and then continues in the Czech Republic. The stream flows through the territories of Stará Voda, Mähring, Broumov, Chodský Újezd, Zadní Chodov, Planá, Brod nad Tichou and Kočov.

== See also ==
- List of rivers of the Czech Republic
- List of rivers of Bavaria
