= Chodová Planá =

- Market town
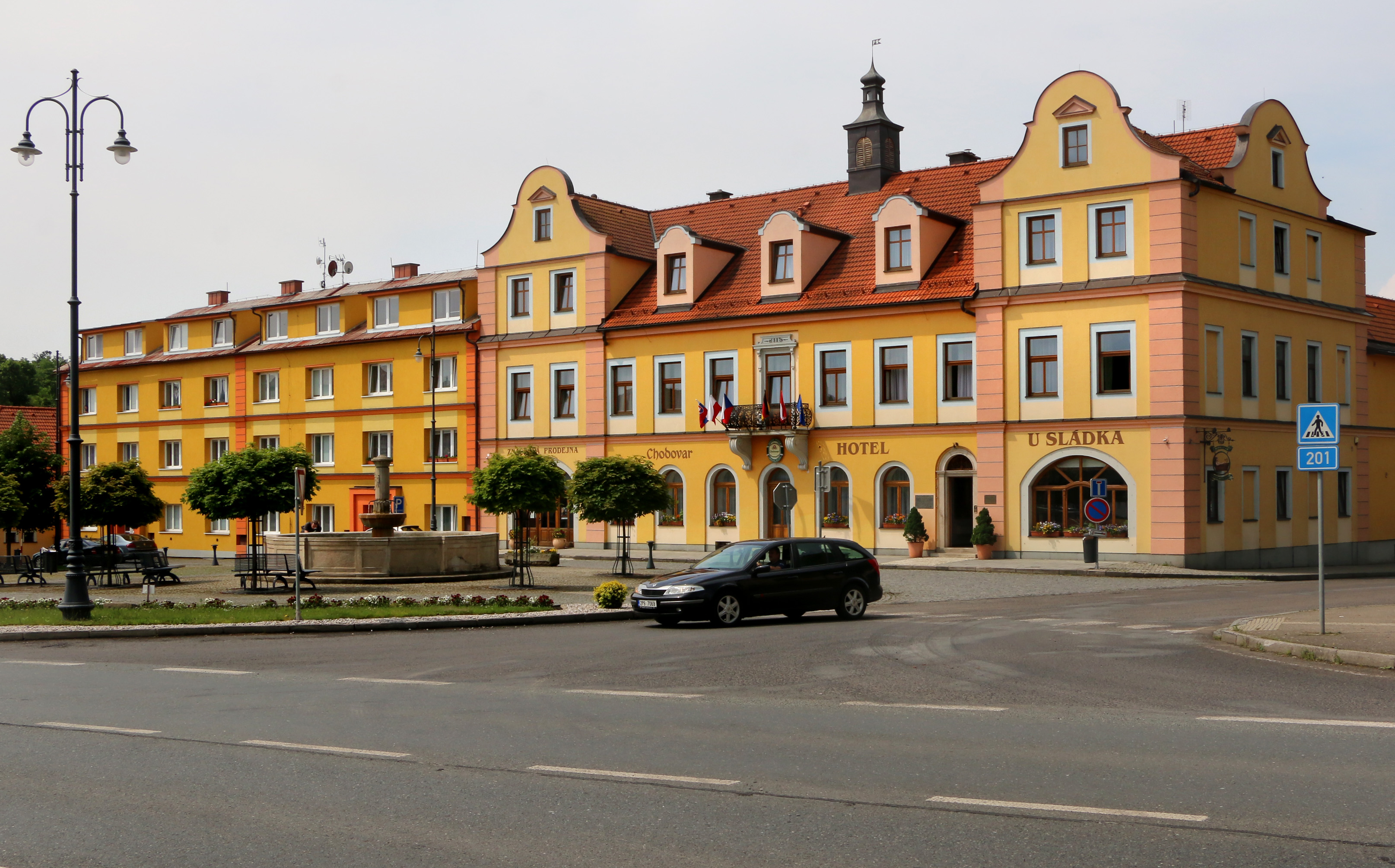
- Main square

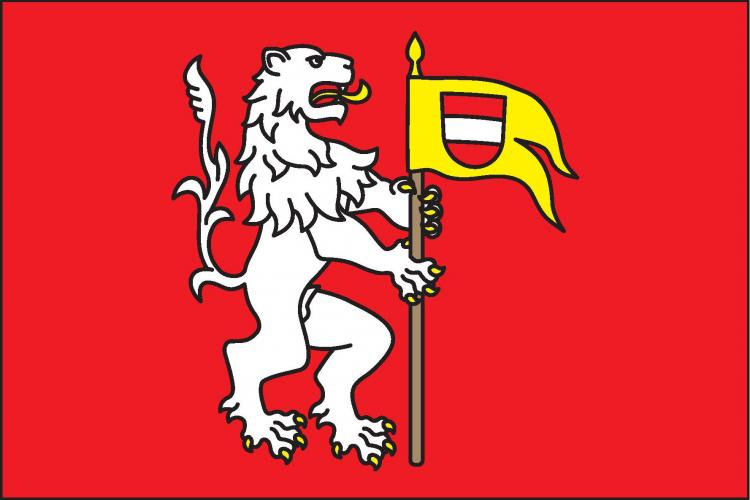
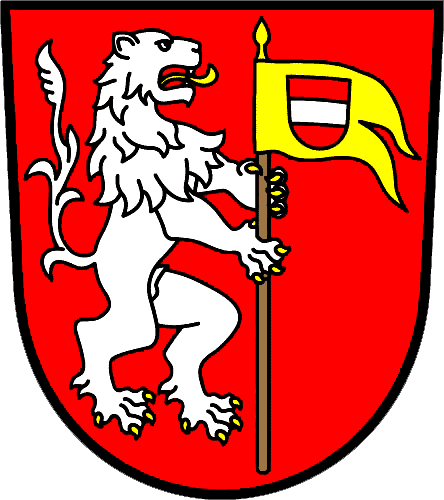
- Flag Coat of arms

- Location in the Czech Republic
- Coordinates: 49°53′39″N 12°43′51″E
- Country: Czech Republic
- Region: Plzeň
- District: Tachov
- First mentioned: 1319

Area
  - Total: 55.24 km^{2} (21.33 sq mi)
- Elevation: 537 m (1,762 ft)

Population (2026-01-01)
  - Total: 2,004
  - Density: 36.28/km^{2} (93.96/sq mi)
- Time zone: UTC+1 (CET)
  - Summer (DST): UTC+2 (CEST)
- Postal code: 348 13
- Website: www.chodovaplana.cz

Chodová Planá (Czech pronunciation: [ˈxodovaː ˈplanaː]; German: Kuttenplan) is a market town in Tachov District in the Plzeň Region of the Czech Republic. It has about 2,000 inhabitants.

== Administrative division ==
Chodová Planá consists of eight municipal parts (in brackets population according to the 2021 census):

- Chodová Planá (1,546)
- Boněnov (67)
- Dolní Kramolín (38)
- Holubín (5)
- Hostíčkov (12)
- Michalovy Hory (81)
- Pístov (12)
- Výškov (44)

== Geography ==
Chodová Planá is located about 12 kilometres (7 mi) northeast of Tachov and 49 km (30 mi) northwest of Plzeň. Most of the municipal territory lies in the Teplá Highlands, but the western part with the built-up area lies in the Podčeskoleská Hills. The highest point is at 748 m (2,454 ft) above sea level.

The stream Kosový potok flows across the municipal territory. There are several fishponds in the vicinity of the market town. The largest of them is Regent, a 52 ha (130-acre) pond used for sports and recreational purposes. The pond was founded in 1479.

== History ==
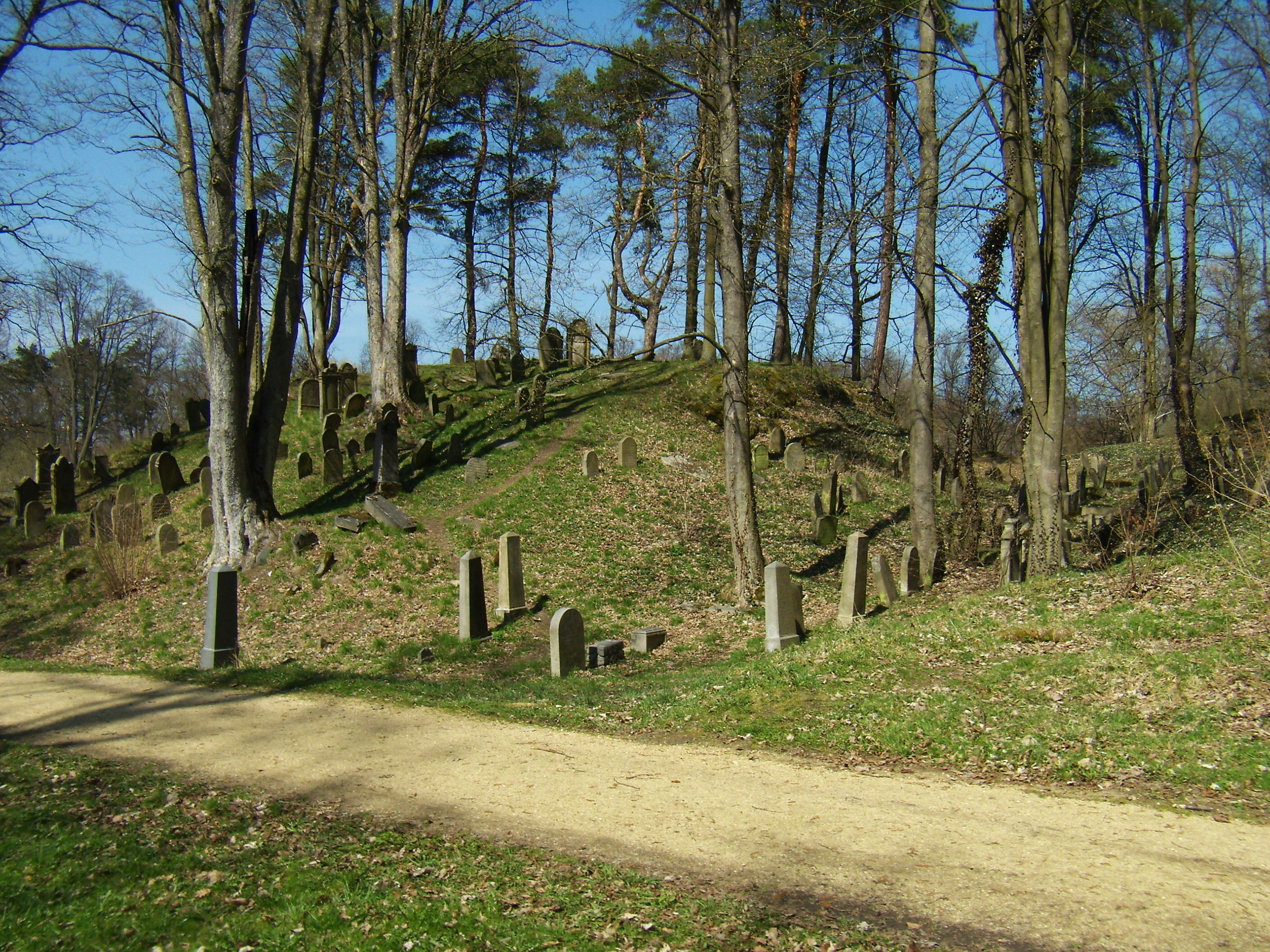
Old Jewish cemetery

The first written mention of Chodová Planá is from 1319, when it was a property of the knights Ctibor and Oldřich. It was then owned by various knights, and in 1391 and 1413 it was documented as the property of the Teplá Abbey. Its owners often changed until 1560, when Chodová Planá was bought by the Širtingar (German: Schirnding) family.

After the Battle of White Mountain in 1620, the properties of the Širtingar family were confiscated, and Chodová Planá was acquired by the counts of Haimhausen. The estate remained in their possession until the abolition of serfdom in 1848. In 1733, a huge fire destroyed half of the market town, including the church.

Until 1938, Chodová Planá had a Jewish community. Its presence is documented by two remaining Jewish cemeteries.

== Demographics ==
Historical population

Year	Pop.	±%
1869	3,488	—
1880	3,684	+5.6%
1890	3,581	−2.8%
1900	3,559	−0.6%
1910	3,714	+4.4%

Year	Pop.	±%
1921	3,701	−0.4%
1930	3,889	+5.1%
1950	1,540	−60.4%
1961	1,739	+12.9%
1970	1,737	−0.1%

Year	Pop.	±%
1980	1,735	−0.1%
1991	1,691	−2.5%
2001	1,778	+5.1%
2011	1,797	+1.1%
2021	1,805	+0.4%

Source: Censuses

== Economy ==
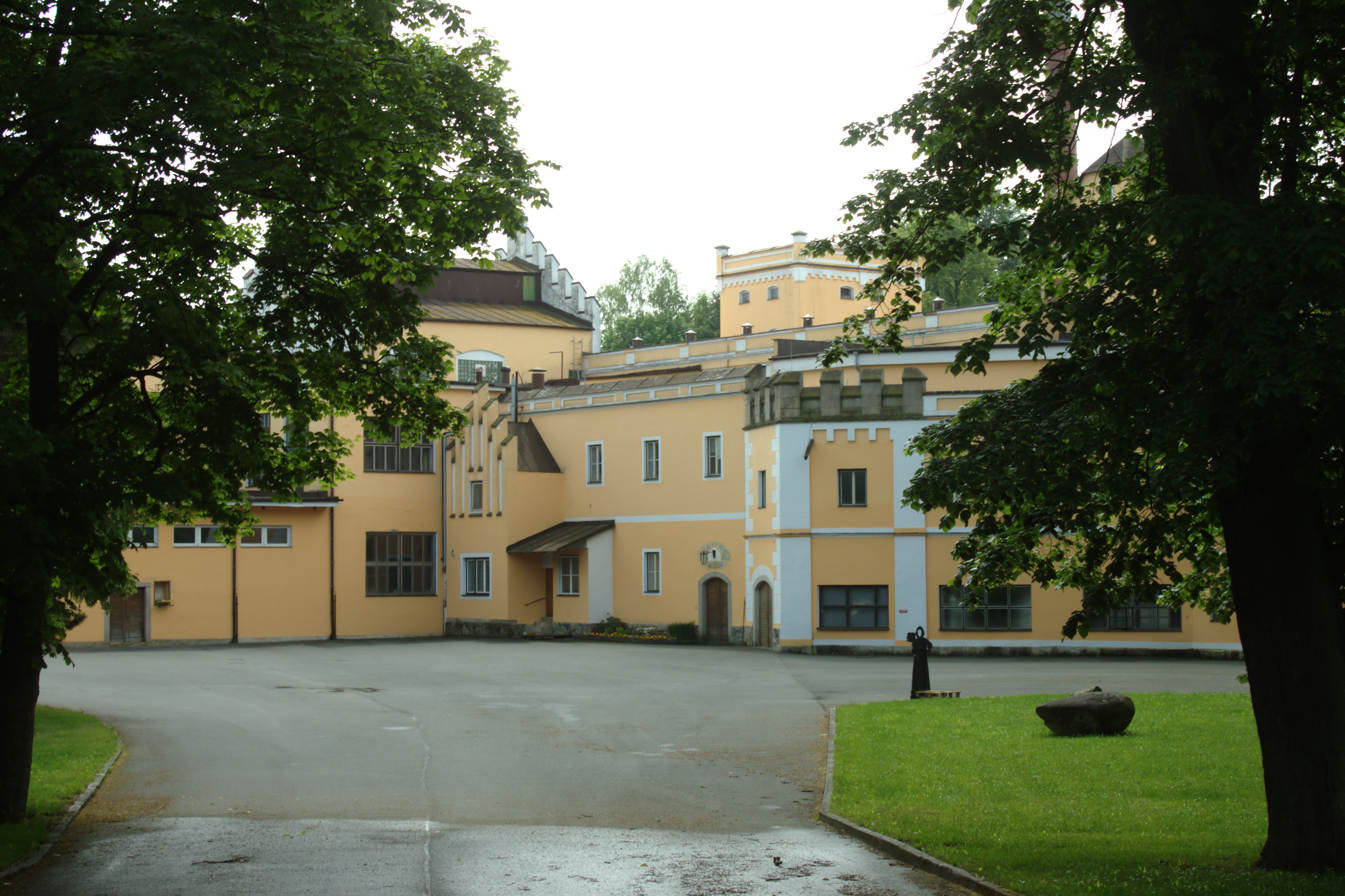
Chodovar brewery

Chodová Planá is known for the oldest brewery in the west Bohemian region, which is named Chodovar. The first written reference of the brewery is from 1573, however, its much older history is evidenced by cellars from the 14th century, carved in granite rock, still used to brew beer.

The brewery is best known today for its beer spa. Guests can soak in a dark lager/mineral water blend in copper tubs. The beer soak spa treatment is said to have medicinal benefits.

== Transport ==
The I/21 road, which connects the D5 motorway with Cheb, runs through the market town.

Chodová Planá is located on the railway line Plzeň–Karlovy Vary.

== Sport ==
The town has a sports club, TJ Slavoj Chodová Planá.

== Sights ==
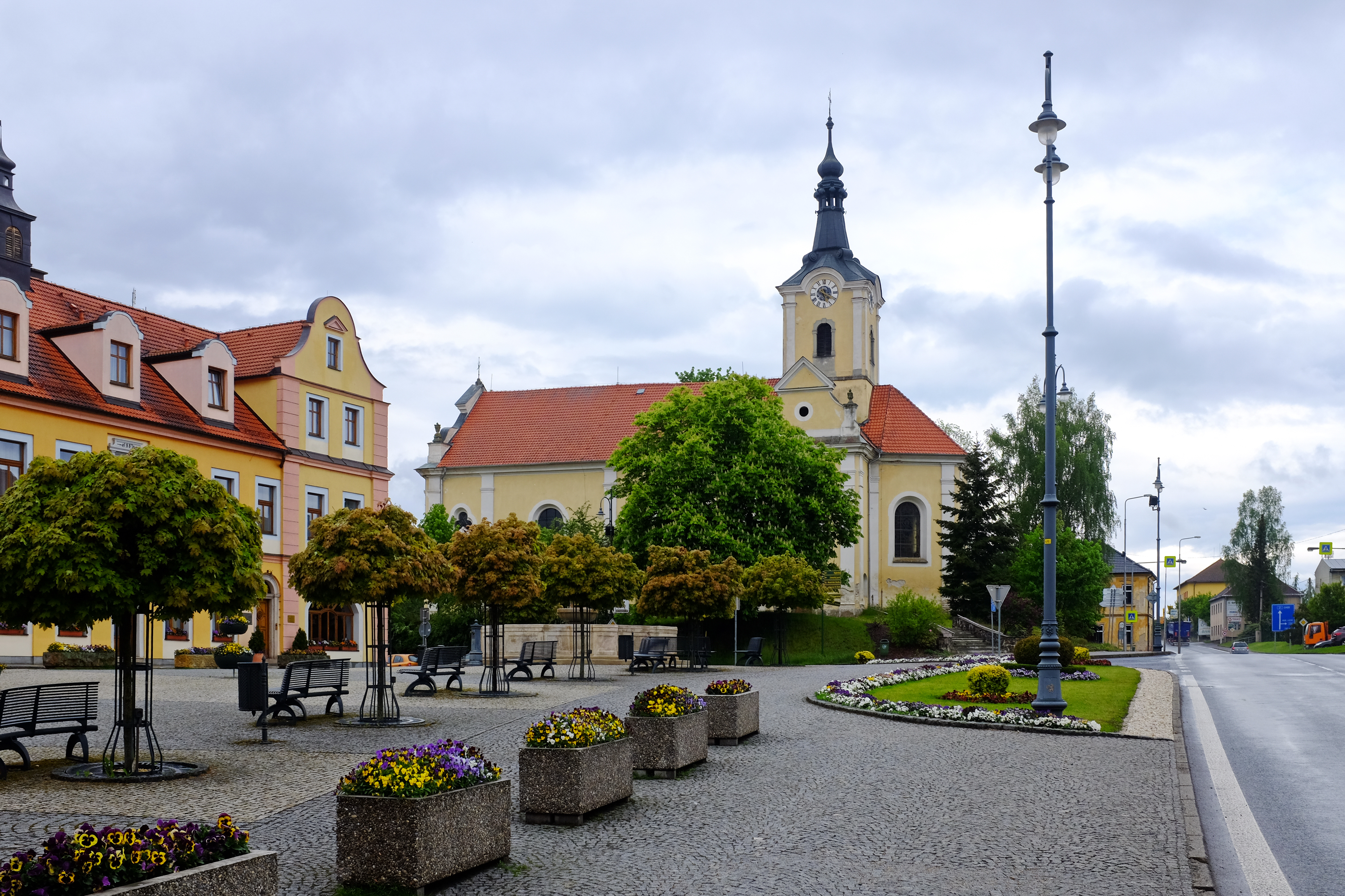
Church of Saint John the Baptist

The Church of Saint John the Baptist replaced the old one destroyed by the fire. It was built in the Baroque style in 1748–1754.

The Old Castle in Chodová Planá from 1734 was rebuilt into the cultural house. The New Castle was built in 1906. It includes a spacious park.

In the brewery, there is a small brewery museum.

== Notable people ==
- Johann Emanuel Veith (1787–1876), Roman Catholic preacher

== Twin towns – sister cities ==
Chodová Planá is twinned with:

- Störnstein, Germany
