= Siegfried Becher =

Austrian political economist

Siegfried Becher (28 February 1806 – 4 March 1873) was an Austrian political economist.

== Biography ==
Becher was born in Planá, Bohemia. He studied at Prague and Vienna. In 1831, he entered government service. He was appointed professor at the Polytechnic Institute, Vienna, in 1835. From 1848 to 1852, he was employed in the ministry of commerce, for which he made a trip of investigation in Germany and Belgium in 1849. He died in Vienna.

== Works ==
- Das österreichische Münzwesen von 1524-1838 in historischer, statistischer und legislativer Hinsicht (two volumes, Vienna 1838)
- Statistiche Uebersicht des Handels der österreichischen Monarchie mit dem Auslande während der Jahre 1829-38 (Stuttgart 1841)
- Ergebnisse des Handels- und Zolleinkommens der österreichischen Monarchie von den Jahren 1819–43 (1846)
- Die deutschen Zoll-und Handelsverhältnisse zur Anbahnung der österreichisch-deutschen Zoll-und Handelseinigung (Leipzig 1850)
- Die Volkswirtschaft (Vienna 1853)
