= Valy (Cheb District) =

- Municipality
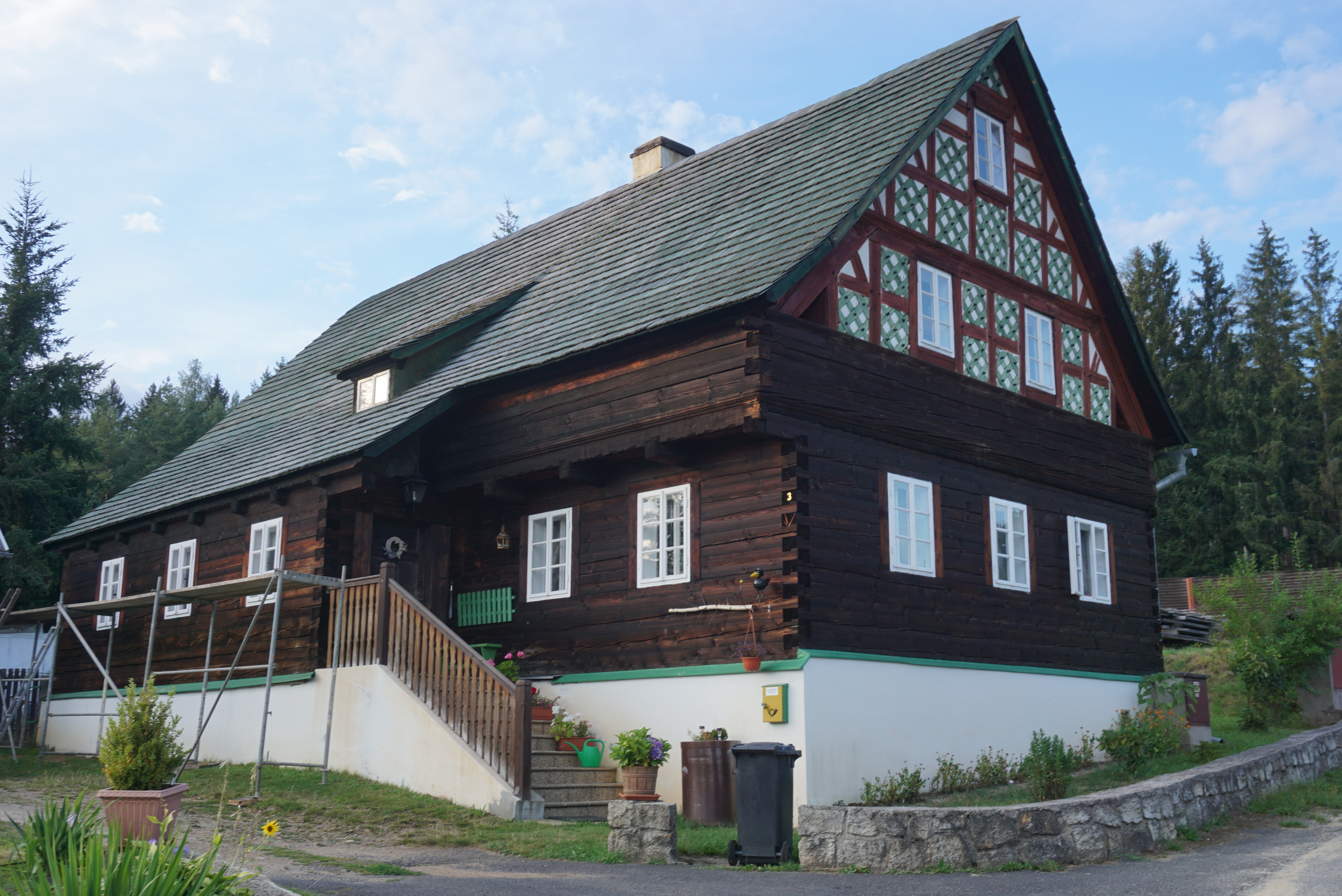
- House No. 3

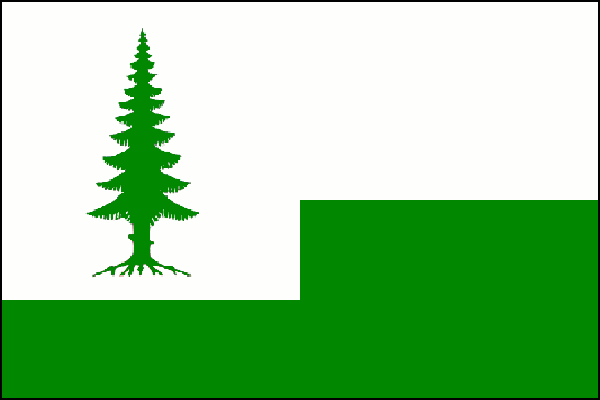
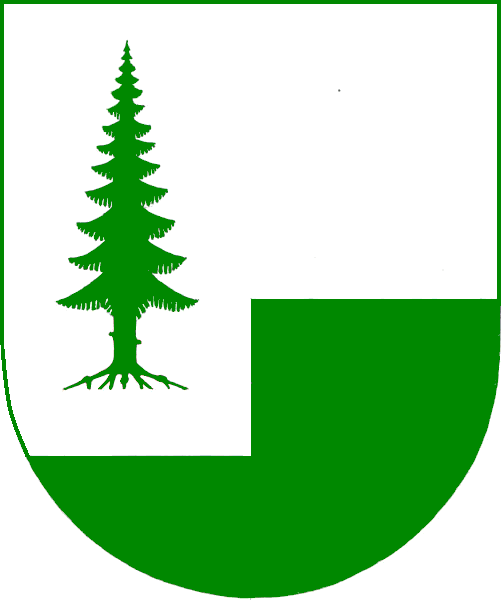
- Flag Coat of arms

- Location in the Czech Republic
- Coordinates: 49°58′37″N 12°39′17″E
- Country: Czech Republic
- Region: Karlovy Vary
- District: Cheb
- First mentioned: 1788

Area
  - Total: 4.30 km^{2} (1.66 sq mi)
- Elevation: 555 m (1,821 ft)

Population (2026-01-01)
  - Total: 468
  - Density: 109/km^{2} (282/sq mi)
- Time zone: UTC+1 (CET)
  - Summer (DST): UTC+2 (CEST)
- Postal code: 353 01
- Website: www.obecvaly.cz

Valy (until 1947 Šance; German: Schanz) is a municipality and village in Cheb District in the Karlovy Vary Region of the Czech Republic. It has about 500 inhabitants. The rural area in the northern part of the municipality is a part of spa cultural landscape of Mariánské Lázně, which is protected as an urban monument reservation.

== Demographics ==
Historical population
Year	Pop.	±%
1869	427	—
1880	558	+30.7%
1890	675	+21.0%
1900	551	−18.4%
1910	614	+11.4%
1921	541	−11.9%
1930	588	+8.7%
1950	207	−64.8%
1961	268	+29.5%
1970	253	−5.6%
1980	249	−1.6%
1991	290	+16.5%
2001	305	+5.2%
2011	419	+37.4%
2021	468	+11.7%
Source: Censuses
