= Lestkov (Tachov District) =

- Municipality
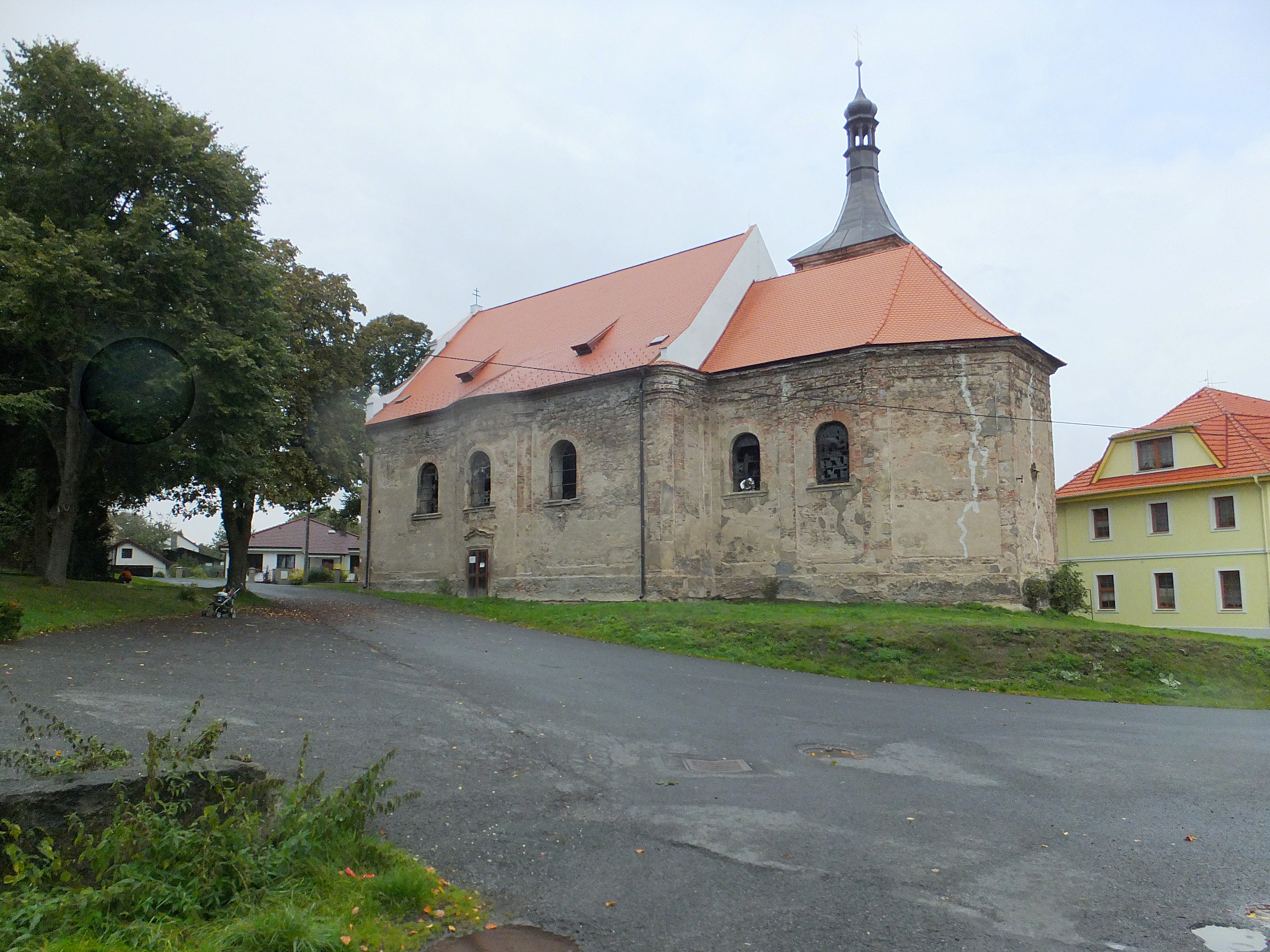
- Church of Saint Procopius

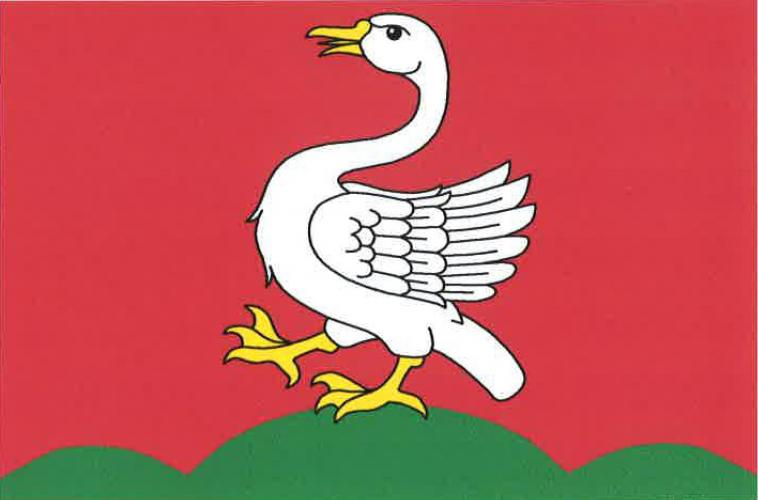
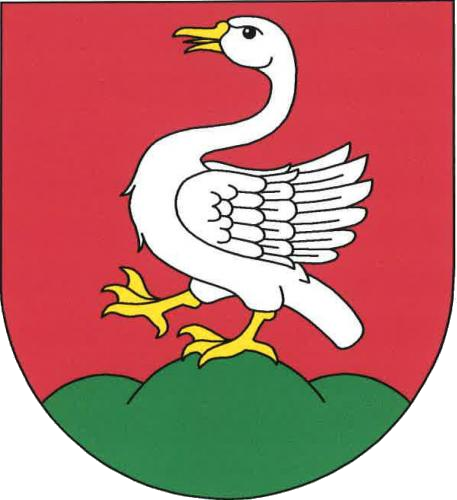
- Flag Coat of arms

- Location in the Czech Republic
- Coordinates: 49°52′59″N 12°52′16″E
- Country: Czech Republic
- Region: Plzeň
- District: Tachov
- First mentioned: 1257

Area
  - Total: 38.80 km^{2} (14.98 sq mi)
- Elevation: 617 m (2,024 ft)

Population (2026-01-01)
  - Total: 435
  - Density: 11.2/km^{2} (29.0/sq mi)
- Time zone: UTC+1 (CET)
  - Summer (DST): UTC+2 (CEST)
- Postal code: 349 53
- Website: www.obeclestkov.cz

Lestkov is a municipality and village in Tachov District in the Plzeň Region of the Czech Republic. It has about 400 inhabitants.

Lestkov lies approximately 20 kilometres (12 mi) north-east of Tachov, 39 km (24 mi) west of Plzeň, and 114 km (71 mi) west of Prague.

== Administrative division ==
Lestkov consists of six municipal parts (in brackets population according to the 2021 census):

- Lestkov (262)
- Domaslav (37)
- Hanov (15)
- Stan (22)
- Vrbice u Bezdružic (7)
- Vysoké Jamné (44)

== Demographics ==
Historical population
Year	Pop.	±%
1869	2,174	—
1880	2,169	−0.2%
1890	2,195	+1.2%
1900	2,189	−0.3%
1910	2,175	−0.6%
1921	2,003	−7.9%
1930	1,992	−0.5%
1950	872	−56.2%
1961	696	−20.2%
1970	559	−19.7%
1980	418	−25.2%
1991	346	−17.2%
2001	361	+4.3%
2011	357	−1.1%
2021	387	+8.4%
Source: Censuses
