= Tři Sekery =

- Municipality
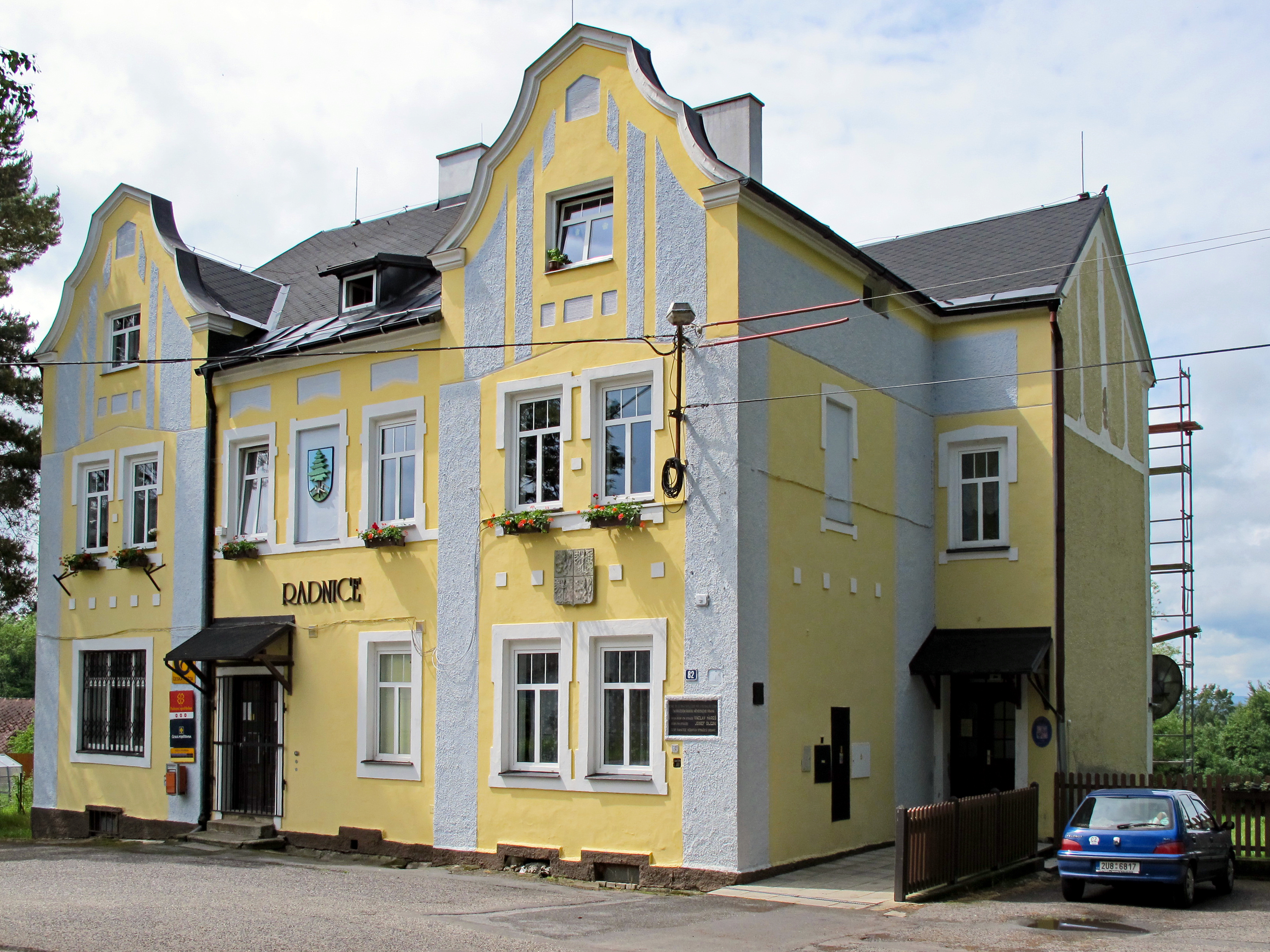
- Municipal office

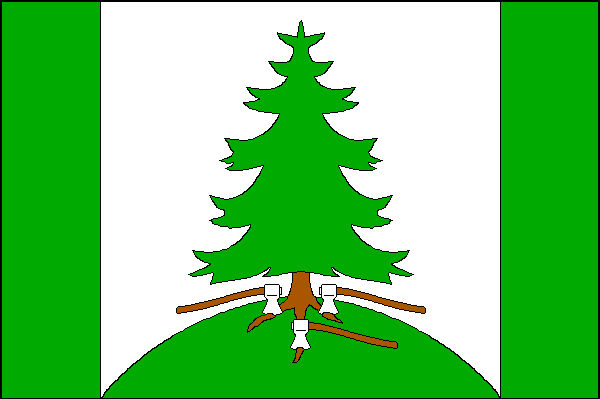
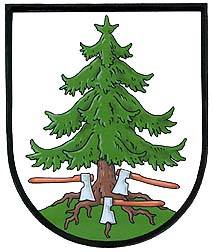
- Flag Coat of arms

- Location in the Czech Republic
- Coordinates: 49°56′32″N 12°37′0″E
- Country: Czech Republic
- Region: Karlovy Vary
- District: Cheb
- First mentioned: 1555

Area
  - Total: 41.18 km^{2} (15.90 sq mi)
- Elevation: 665 m (2,182 ft)

Population (2026-01-01)
  - Total: 1,072
  - Density: 26.03/km^{2} (67.42/sq mi)
- Time zone: UTC+1 (CET)
  - Summer (DST): UTC+2 (CEST)
- Postal code: 354 73
- Website: trisekery.cz

Tři Sekery (German: Dreihacken) is a municipality and village in Cheb District in the Karlovy Vary Region of the Czech Republic. It has about 1,100 inhabitants.

== Administrative division ==
Tři Sekery consists of four municipal parts (in brackets population according to the 2021 census):

- Tři Sekery (424)
- Chodovská Huť (135)
- Krásné (301)
- Tachovská Huť (51)

== Demographics ==
Historical population
| Year | Pop. | ±% |
|---|---|---|
| 1869 | 3,814 | — |
| 1880 | 3,857 | +1.1% |
| 1890 | 3,873 | +0.4% |
| 1900 | 3,749 | −3.2% |
| 1910 | 3,671 | −2.1% |
| 1921 | 3,406 | −7.2% |
| 1930 | 3,144 | −7.7% |
| 1950 | 850 | −73.0% |
| 1961 | 813 | −4.4% |
| 1970 | 769 | −5.4% |
| 1980 | 695 | −9.6% |
| 1991 | 654 | −5.9% |
| 2001 | 714 | +9.2% |
| 2011 | 845 | +18.3% |
| 2021 | 911 | +7.8% |
Source: Censuses
