= Planá =

- Town
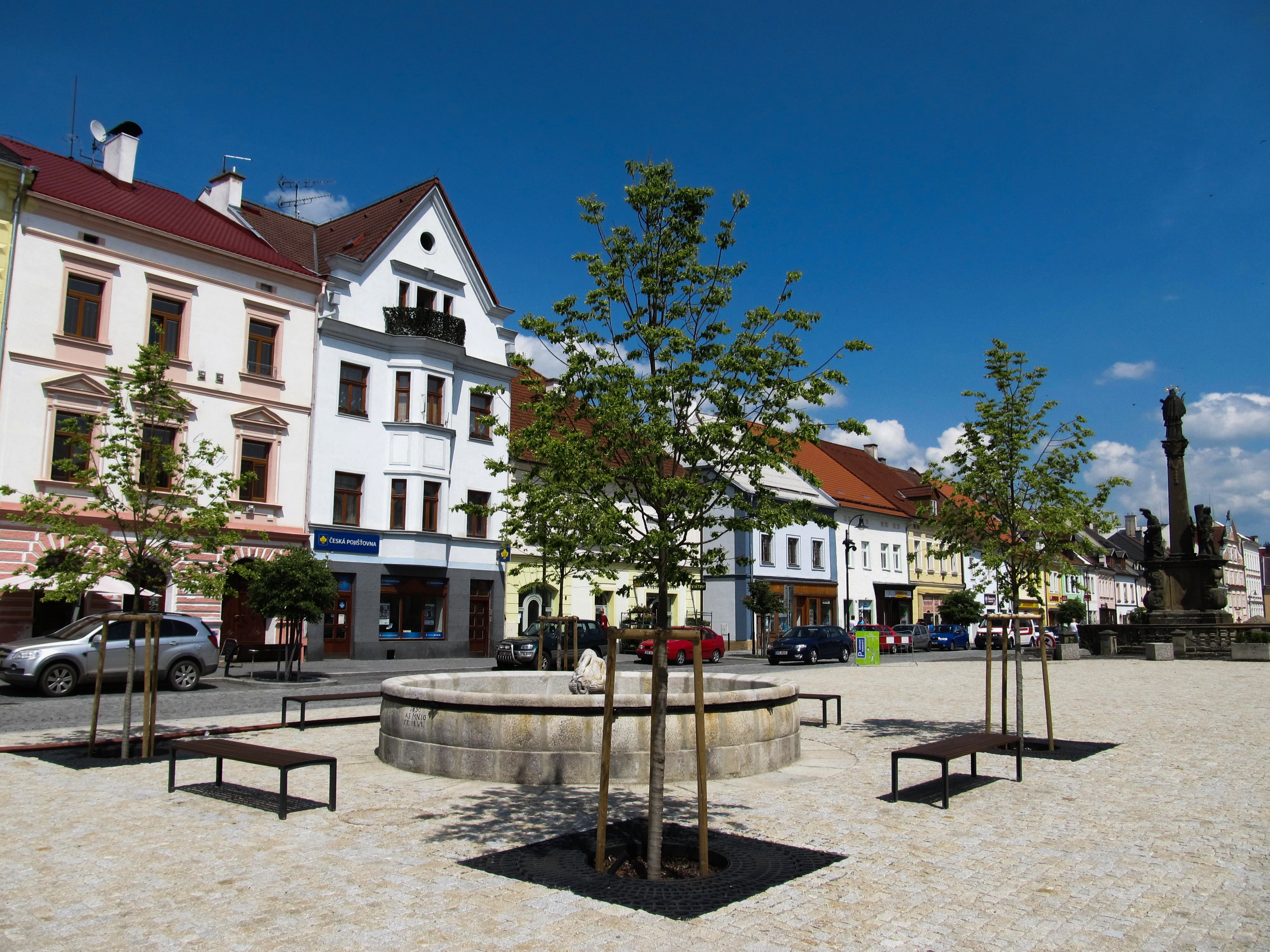
- Náměstí Svobody, historic centre

- Flag Coat of arms

- Location in the Czech Republic
- Coordinates: 49°52′6″N 12°44′25″E
- Country: Czech Republic
- Region: Plzeň
- District: Tachov
- First mentioned: 1251

Government
  - Mayor: Martina Němečková

Area
  - Total: 62.47 km^{2} (24.12 sq mi)
- Elevation: 506 m (1,660 ft)

Population (2026-01-01)
  - Total: 5,528
  - Density: 88.49/km^{2} (229.2/sq mi)
- Time zone: UTC+1 (CET)
  - Summer (DST): UTC+2 (CEST)
- Postal code: 348 15
- Website: www.plana.cz

Planá (Czech pronunciation: [ˈplanaː]; also known as Planá u Mariánských Lázní; German: Plan) is a town in Tachov District in the Plzeň Region of the Czech Republic. It has about 5,500 inhabitants. The town is located on the border between the Teplá Highlands and Podčeskoleská Hills.

The historic town centre is well preserved and is protected as an urban monument zone. The most valuable monument is the Church of Saints Peter and Paul from the 13th century. Planá is known as the birthplace of Czech president Petr Pavel.

== Administrative division ==
Planá consists of ten municipal parts (in brackets population according to the 2021 census):

- Planá (4,869)
- Křínov (33)
- Kříženec (40)
- Otín (64)
- Pavlovice (68)
- Svahy (52)
- Týnec (49)
- Vížka (18)
- Vysoké Sedliště (50)
- Zliv (49)

== Etymology ==
The Czech word planá meant 'barren', but it also denoted a wide, open landscape.

== Geography ==
Planá is located about 10 kilometres (6 mi) northeast of Tachov and 46 km (29 mi) west of Plzeň. It lies on the border between the Teplá Highlands and Podčeskoleská Hills. The highest point is the hill Homole at 681 m (2,234 ft) above sea level.

The Mže River flows through the southern part of the municipal territory. The stream Kosový potok flows along the eastern municipal border and then joins the Mže. The stream Hamerský potok flows through the western part of the municipal territory. The stream Planský potok, its tributary, flows next to the town centre. There are several fishponds in the territory of Planá, the largest of which are Anenský rybník and Labutí rybník.

== History ==
The first written mention of Planá is from 1251. Planá was located on an important trade route from Nuremberg to Cheb. The oldest part of Planá was built during the 13th and 14th century and at the end of the 14th century it was quite a large town, surrounded by walls and a moat.

In the 16th century, two plague epidemics hit the town, which caused a significant decrease in the population and led to the invitation of colonists from Germany and the beginning of the Germanisation of the town. Another misfortune came in the 17th century during the Thirty Years' War, when Planá was conquered and looted several times by various armies.

The Planá estate was owned by several aristocratic families, including Lords of Dobrohošť, Žeberka family, Schlick family, Sinzerdorf family, Nostitz family and Nostitz-Rhieneck family. The most significant owners were the Schlick family. During their reign, mining flourished and the mint was moved to Planá after it ceased to exist in Jáchymov.

== Demographics ==
Historical population

Year	Pop.	±%
1869	5,549	—
1880	6,148	+10.8%
1890	5,765	−6.2%
1900	6,103	+5.9%
1910	6,434	+5.4%

Year	Pop.	±%
1921	6,459	+0.4%
1930	6,999	+8.4%
1950	3,779	−46.0%
1961	3,922	+3.8%
1970	4,251	+8.4%

Year	Pop.	±%
1980	4,652	+9.4%
1991	5,045	+8.4%
2001	5,400	+7.0%
2011	5,458	+1.1%
2021	5,292	−3.0%

Source: Censuses

== Transport ==
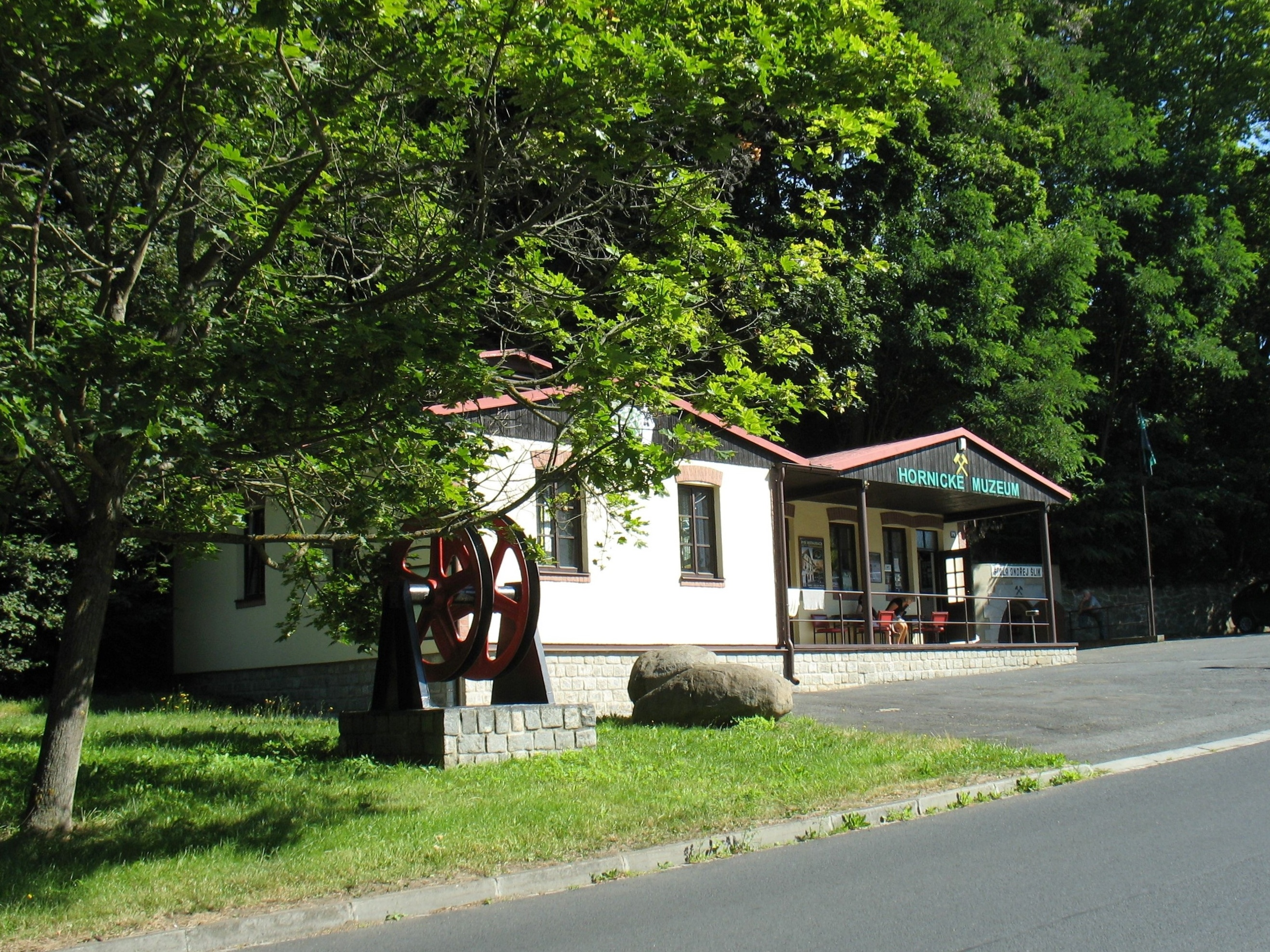
Mining Museum

The I/21 road, which connects the D5 motorway with Cheb, runs through the town.

Planá is located on the railway line Plzeň–Karlovy Vary.

== Sights ==
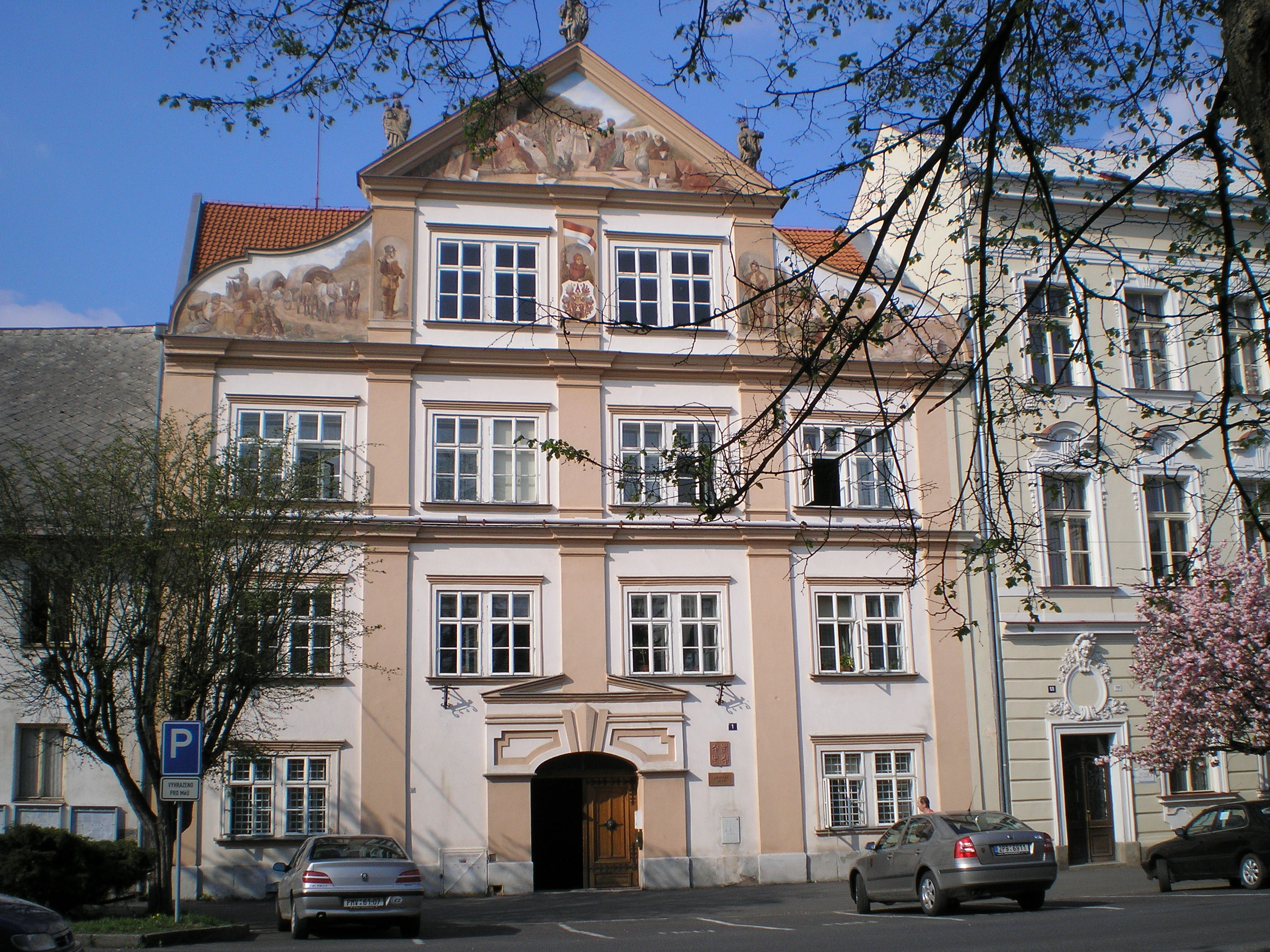
Town hall

The square Náměstí Svobody is in the town's historic core. The town hall was built in 1680–1685. The Baroque plague column with the statue of Saint John of Nepomuk on its top is from 1712. Most of the houses on the square are in Gothic or Renaissance style and are protected as cultural monuments.

The oldest town's monument is the Church of Saints Peter and Paul from the 13th century. It is the nationwide important monument with unique frescoes and a rare Romanesque portal with an arched frieze.

The Church of the Assumption of the Virgin Mary is the largest church in Planá. It was built in the 13th–14th century, originally in the late Romanesque style.

The Mining Museum is located in the Ondřej Schlick adit, which was excavated in the 16th century. It documents mining of silver ore in Planá and its surroundings, and existence of mint for minting silver coins, owned the Schlick family.

The castle was continuously built and rebuilt from the 13th to the 20th century and therefore contains building elements from Gothic to the present. Between 1948 and 1991 it served as barracks of the border guard and since then it is abandoned and is crumbling. Its English park is open to the public.

== Notable people ==
- Franz Wilibald Schmidt (1764–1796), botanist and illustrator
- Siegfried Becher (1806–1873), Austrian political economist
- Hans Tropsch (1889–1935), chemist
- Fritz Wittmann (1933–2018), German politician
- Petr Pavel (born 1961), army general and president of the Czech Republic
- Zdeněk Štybar (born 1985), cyclo-cross racer
- David Vaněček (born 1991), footballer
- Dominik Kahun (born 1995), German ice-hockey player
- Matyáš Bělohradský (born 2001), figure skater

== Twin towns – sister cities ==
Planá is twinned with:

- Tirschenreuth, Germany
