= Černoch =

Černoch (feminine: Černochová) is a Czech surname, meaning 'black person' as a reference to individual's darker skin or hair. Notable people with the surname include:

- Jana Černochová (born 1973), Czech politician
- Jiří Černoch (born 1996), Czech ice hockey player
- Karel Černoch (1943–2007), Czech singer, guitarist and comedian
- Martin Černoch (born 1977), Czech footballer

== See also ==
- Černý, Czech surname meaning 'black'
- János Csernoch (1852–1927), Slovak-Hungarian Catholic clergyman
