= Podčeskoleská Hills =

Geomorphological region of the Czech Republic

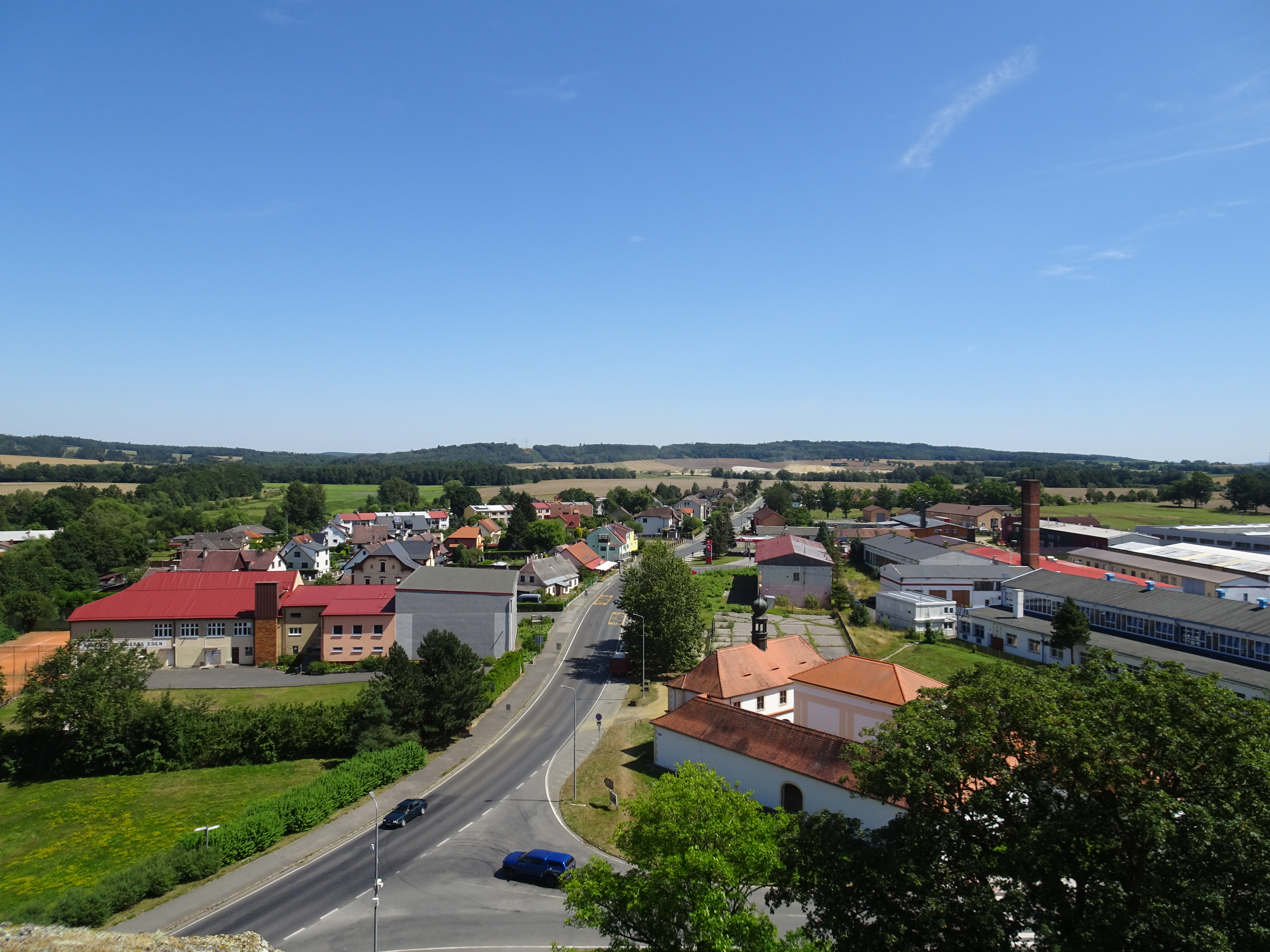
- Central part of the Podčeskoleská Hills with Bor

Highest point
- Peak: Chebský vršek
- Elevation: 679 m (2,228 ft)

Dimensions
- Length: 70 km (43 mi)
- Area: 746 km^{2} (288 mi^{2})

Geography
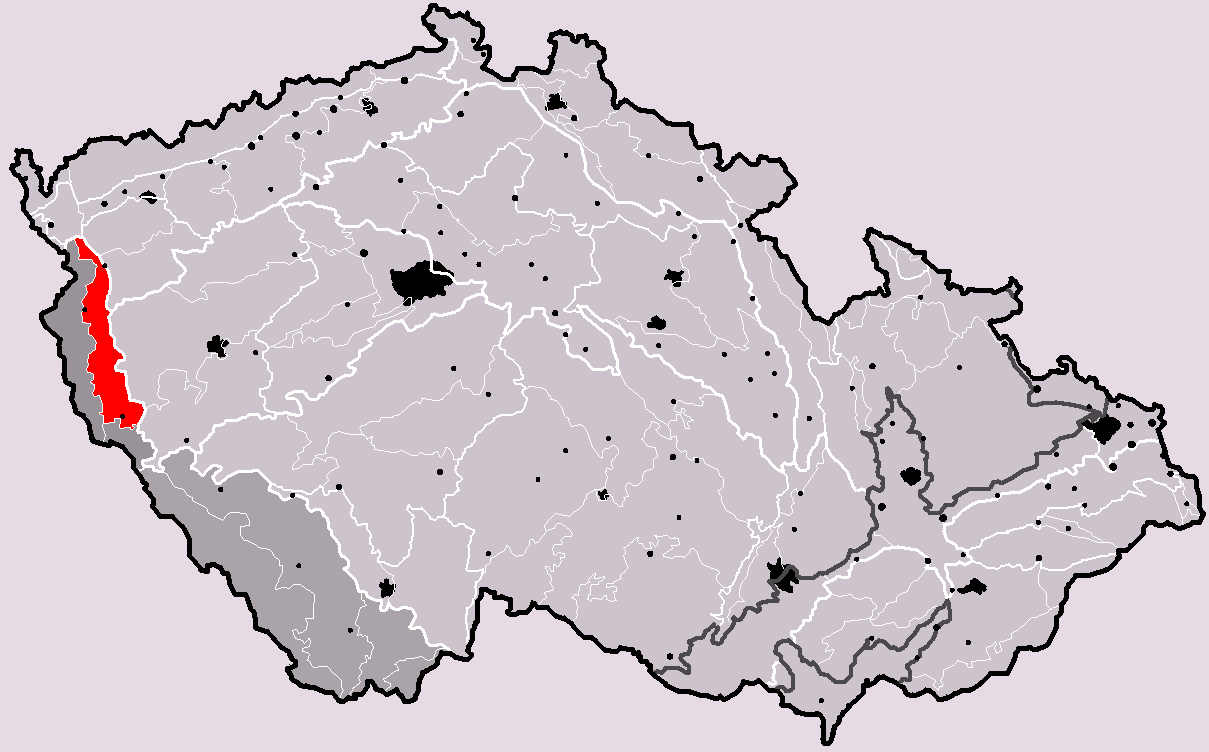
- Podčeskoleská Hills in the geomorphological system of the Czech Republic
- Country: Czech Republic
- Regions: Plzeň, Karlovy Vary
- Range coordinates: 49°41′N 12°46′E
- Parent range: Upper Palatine Forest Macroregion

Geology
- Rock type(s): Granite, sedimentary rocks

The Podčeskoleská Hills (Czech: Podčeskoleská pahorkatina) are uplands and a geomorphological mesoregion of the Czech Republic. It is located along the Upper Palatine Forest mountain range, in the Plzeň and Karlovy Vary regions.

== Geomorphology ==
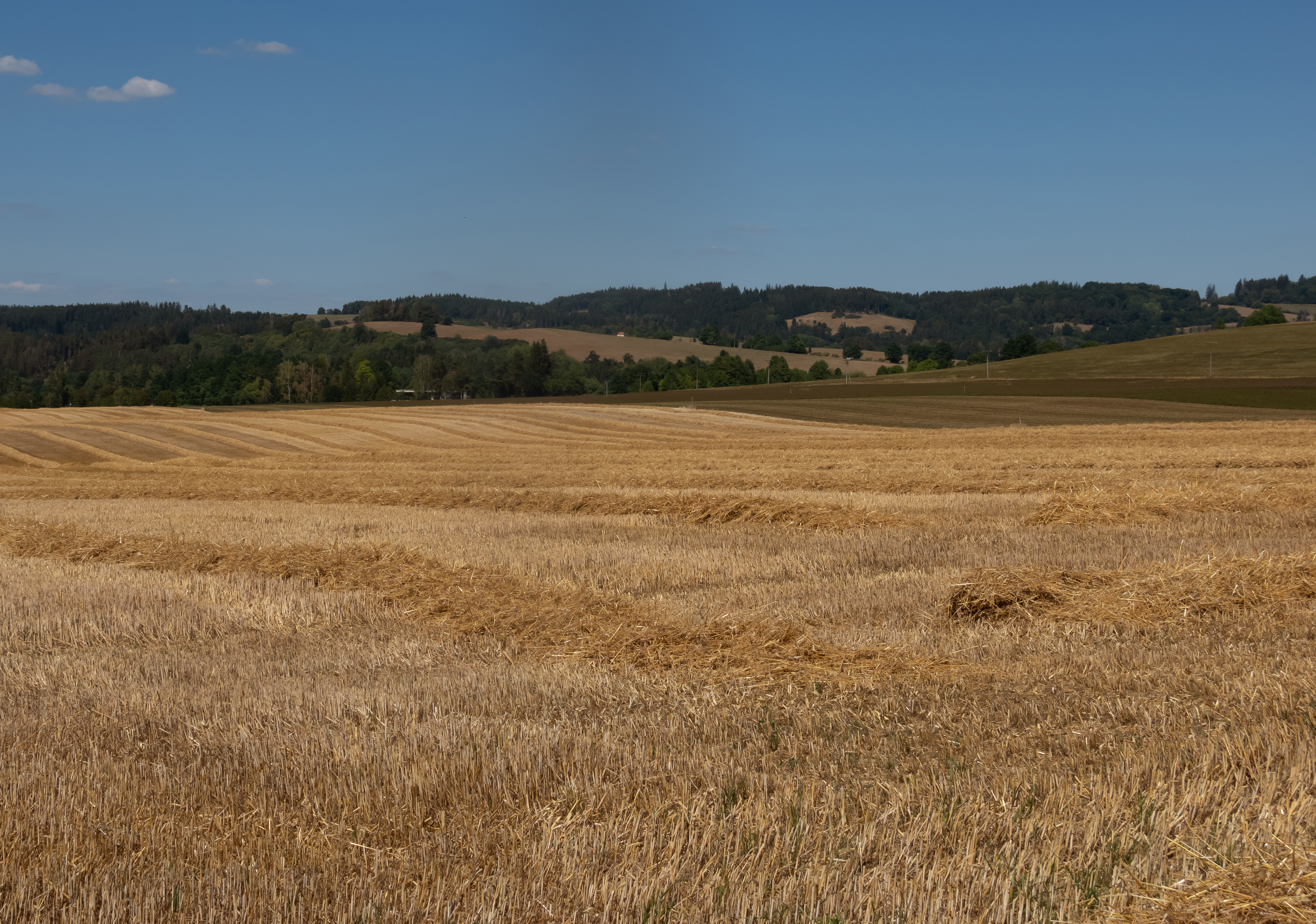
Landscape near Chodová Planá

The Podčeskoleská Hills is a mesoregion of the Upper Palatine Forest Macroregion within the Bohemian Massif. The mesoregion extends along the Upper Palatine Forest mountains and forms a depression between this mountain range and the eastern highlands. The mesoregion is further subdivided into the microregions of Tachov Furrow and Chodsko Uplands.

The highest peaks of the Podčeskoleská Hills are:

- Chebský vršek, 679 m (2,228 ft)
- Černá hora, 662 m (2,172 ft)
- Na Vrších, 626 m (2,054 ft)
- Na Hvězdě, 623 m (2,044 ft)
- Sedlo, 615 m (2,018 ft)
- Chlumek, 605 m (1,985 ft)
- Vačina, 587 m (1,926 ft)
- Hrádek, 585 m (1,919 ft)
- Panský vrch, 584 m (1,916 ft)
- Pískový vrch, 580 m (1,900 ft)

== Geography ==
The Podčeskoleská Hills has an area of 746 km^{2} (288 sq mi) and an average elevation of 491 m (1,611 ft). The territory has an elongated shape from the north to the south, which is about 70 km (43 mi) long and about 10 km (6.2 mi) wide.

The territory is crossed by many watercourses that flow down from the Upper Palatine Forest and continue eastwards. The most important such watercourses are the Mže and the Radbuza. The area is rich in small fishponds. The largest body of water is the fishpond Regent with an area of 52 ha (130 acres).

The most populated towns that are entirely or mostly located in the territory are Tachov, Mariánské Lázně, Domažlice, Planá, Horšovský Týn and Bor.

== Geology ==
The geological bedrock is mainly composed of granite and sedimentary rocks (sand, gravels, clay). To a lesser extent, schists, gneisses, paragneisses and phyllites are found here.

== Nature ==
Compared to neighbouring natural regions, there is a high proportion of agricultural land and low proportion of forests.

Small parts of the protected landscape areas of Slavkov Forest and Český les extend into the Podčeskoleská Hills.
