= List of Czech architects =

This is a list of notable architects from the Czech Republic.

== A–M ==
- Jakub Auguston
- Václav Aulický
- František Bílek
- Heinrich Blum
- Josef Chochol
- Christoph Dientzenhofer
- Kilian Ignaz Dientzenhofer
- Alois Dryák
- Otto Eisler
- Karl Ernstberger
- Josef Fanta
- Bedřich Feuerstein
- Daniela Filipiová
- Zdeněk Fránek
- Bohuslav Fuchs
- František Lydie Gahura
- Josef Gočár
- Josef Hlávka
- Josef Hoffmann
- Vlastislav Hofman
- Jan Vladimír Hráský
- Karel Hubáček
- Pavel Janák
- Eva Jiřičná
- František Maxmilián Kaňka
- Jan Kaplický
- Jan Kotěra
- Jaromír Krejcar
- Jiří Kroha
- Jan Letzel
- Jiri Lev
- Evžen Linhart
- Adolf Loos
- Jiří Löw
- Vlado Milunić
- Josef Mocker

== N–Z ==
- Josef Niklas
- Milada Petříková-Pavlíková
- Anton Pilgram
- Osvald Polívka
- Antonin Raymond
- Matěj Rejsek
- Benedikt Rejt
- Jan Blažej Santini-Aichel
- Svatopluk Sládeček
- Markéta Veselá
- Rudolf Wels
- Josef Zítek

== See also ==
- List of architects
- List of Czechs
