= Lienhard =

Lienhard is a germand-language surname. Lienhard is an Upper German, more precisely Alemannic German form of Leonhard.

== Notable people ==
with the surname include:

- Bill Lienhard, American basketball player
- Bob Lienhard, American basketball player
- Erwin Lienhard (1957–2019), Swiss cyclist
- Fabian Lienhard (born 1993), Swiss cyclist
- Fredy Lienhard, Swiss racing driver
- Heinrich Lienhard, Swiss explorer
- Jacob Lienhard, United States Marine Corps officer
- John H. Lienhard, American engineer and historian
- John H. Lienhard V, Professor of Mechanical Engineering at the Massachusetts Institute of Technology
- Pepe Lienhard, Swiss musician
- Siegfried Lienhard, Professor of Indology at Stockholm University
- Walter Lienhard (1890–1973), Swiss sport shooter

== See also ==
- Lienhardt
- Lienhart
- Linhardt
- Linhart
