= Lienhardt =

Lienhardt is a surname. For origin and meaning, see Lienhard. Notable people with the surname include:

- Godfrey Lienhardt (1921–1993), British anthropologist
- Peter Lienhardt (1928–1986), British social anthropologist

== See also ==
- Lienhard
- Lienhart
- Linhart
- Linhardt
