= Stolpersteine in Prague-Holešovice =

Memorial installations in Czech Republic

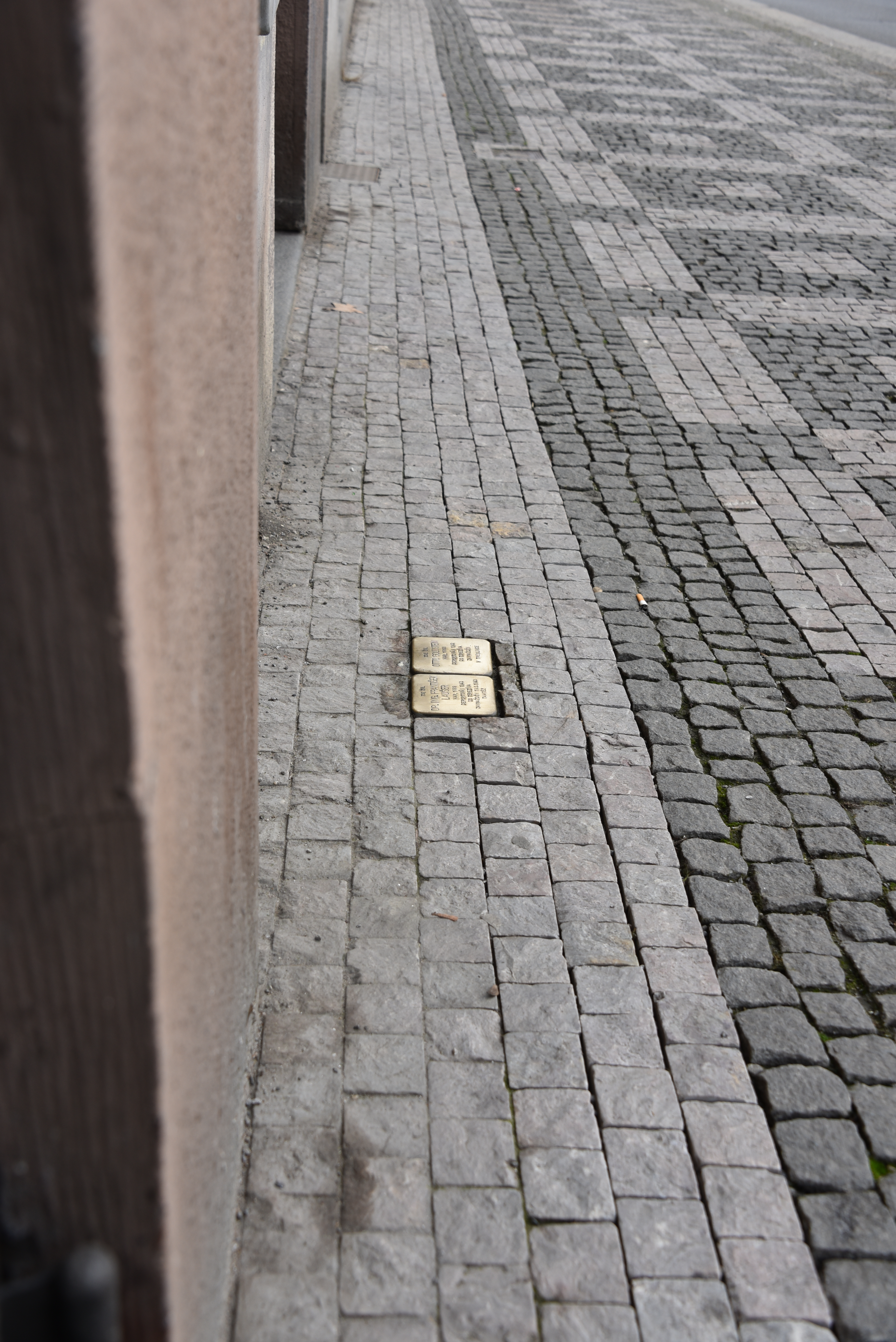
Stolperstein for Otto Goldstein and František Lauser

This is a list of Stolpersteine in the Holešovice district of Prague. Stolpersteine is the German name for stumbling blocks collocated all over Europe by German artist Gunter Demnig. They commemorate the fate of the Nazi victims who were murdered, deported, exiled or driven to suicide.

Generally, the stumbling blocks are positioned in front of the building where the victims had their last self-chosen residence. The name of the Stolpersteine in Czech is: Kameny zmizelých, stones of the disappeared.

== Holešovice ==
Stone	Name	Location	Life and death
	Josef Bergmann	Pplk. Sochora 739/36	Ing. Josef Bergmann was born on 2 September 1880 in Krymlov. He was an engineer and had the Austrian citizenship. On 30 January 1942, he was deported by transport V from Prague to Theresienstadt concentration camp. His transport number was 7 of 1,002. He was interred there for almost three years. On 28 October 1944 he was deported with transport Ev to Auschwitz concentration camp. His transport number was 90 of 2,035. There he was murdered by the Nazi regime.
	Arnošt Cantor	Schnirchova 1085/27	Dr. Arnošt Cantor, also Ernst, was born 13 February 1865 in Teplice. His parents were Wilhelm Cantor (1824-?) and Jetty née Kohn (1831-1921). He had seven siblings, including his twin sister Ernestine. He studied law at the Charles University in Prague. He became a lawyer and married Selma née Mandelbaum, born on 21 June 1878. The couple had three children: Fanny (born on 28 October 1902 in Teplice, married to Max Jaffe); Lotta (born on 2 April 1904); Vilém (born on 2 May 1907, married to Greta, two daughters).; From 1914 until the Nazi occupation of the Sudetenland, he served as chairman of the Teplice Jewish community. Thereafter he fled to Prague. He was also a member of the Supreme Council of Jewish Communities of Czechoslovakia and a member of the delegation of the Jewish Party in Czechoslovakia, that intervened in order to protect the rights of Jews in the Sudetenland. His last residence before deportation was in Prague VII, Schnirchova 13. On 2 July 1942, he was deported to Theresienstadt concentration camp by transport AAl. His transport number was 923 of 1,005. Five months later, on 30 November 1942, he died in Theresienstadt. His daughter Fanny Jaffe was murdered in 1944 in Auschwitz. The fate of his daughter Lotta and of his son Vilém is unknown. His wife died in 1945.
	Otto Goldstein	Kostelní 875/6	Otto Goldstein, also Ota, was born on 10 November 1868 in Borotín. His parents were Michala or Cecil Goldstein and Anna née Steinerová. He had two brothers, Julius (born 1866) and Ignaz (born 1871). he was trading with jewels and was married with Marie née Růžičková. His last residence before deportation was in Prague XI, Huttenova 32. On 9 July 1942, he was deported to Theresienstadt concentration camp by transport AAp. His transport number was 428 of 1,000. Three months later, on 19 October 1942, he was deported to Treblinka extermination camp by transport Bw. His transport number was 271 of 2,002. He was murdered by the Nazi regime. His brother Ignaz was killed in Auschwitz. The fate of his parents and of brother Julius is unknown.
	Robert Laš	Na Maninách 1042/18 (Holešovice-Bubny)	Robert Laš, also Robert Lasch, was born on 19 June 1895 in Černovice. His parents were Salamon Lasch from Bradáčov and Elisabeth née Peschek. He had ten half brothers and half sisters, all born by the first wife of his father, Anna née Peschek, the sister of his mother. He was married to Gabriela. On 16 July 1942, he and his wife were deported to Theresienstadt concentration camp by transport AAr. His transport number was 503 of 1,000. Three months later, on 6 October 1942, the couple were deported to Auschwitz concentration camp by transport Eo. His transport number was 1044 of 1,550. They were both murdered by the Nazi regime.
	Gabriela Lašová née Kohnová	Na Maninách 1042/18 (Holešovice-Bubny)	Gabriela Lašová, also Laschová, was born on 24 June 1894. She was married to Robert Laš. On 16 July 1942, she and her husband were deported to Theresienstadt concentration camp by transport AAr. Her transport number was 504 of 1,000. Three months later, on 6 October 1942, the couple were deported to Auschwitz concentration camp by transport Eo. Her transport number was 1045 of 1,550. They were both murdered by the Nazi regime.
	František Laušer	Kostelní 875/6	Dr. Ing. František Laušer was born on 17 December 1889 in Horní Ročov. His parents were Josef Lauscher (1858-1912) and Bertha née Wolf (1863-1940). He had two sisters, Marta (born 1883, later Kronberger) and Marie (born 1885, later Jelinek). He was married to Marie Laušer. His last residence before deportation was in Prague II, Hálkova 8. On 6 March 1943 he was deported to Theresienstadt concentration camp by transport Cv. His transport number was 27 of 1,022. He was murdered on 19 May 1943 in Theresienstadt. The fate of his wife and of his sisters is unknown.
	Ernestina Metzl	Šternberkova 1357/10 (Holešovice-Bubny)	Ernestina Metzl was born on 27 October 1883 in Vienna. Her parents were Moritz Metzl and Mathilde née Klein (1857-1896). She had two sisters and two brothers: Gustav (born 1879), Franziska (1881-1883), Fritz (1886-1939) and Ella (born 1888). It is not known when she moved to Prague to live with her brother Gustav and his wife. Her last residence before deportation was in Prague VII, Šternberkova 10. On 2 July 1942, Ernestina Metzl was deported to Theresienstadt concentration camp by transport AAl. Her transport number was 660 of 1,005. Four weeks later, on 28 July 1942, she was deported to Baranovichi by transport AAy. Her transport number was 278 of 1,001. Ernestina Metzl was murdered by the Nazi regime. Her brother Gustav and her sister-in-law Ida Metzl were murdered after deportation to Zamość. Her sister Ella and her husband Josef Bermann could emigrate and survive. Josef Bermann died 1949 in New York, Ella Bermann in 1962 also in New York. Also their two sons could survive.
	Gustav Metzl	Šternberkova 1357/10 (Holešovice-Bubny)	Gustav Metzl was born on 1 September 1879 in the district Fünfhaus of Vienna. His parents were Moritz Metzl and Mathilde née Klein (1857-1896). He had three sisters and one brother. He was married to Ida née Fried. It is not known, when the couple moved to Prague. Their last residence before deportation was in Prague VII, Šternberkova 10. On 28 April 1942, Gustav Metzl and his wife were deported to Theresienstadt concentration camp by transport Ao. His transport number was 994 of 1,001. Two days later, on 30 April 1942, the couple were deported to Zamość by transport As. His transport number was 994 of 1,000. Both were murdered by the Nazi regime. Two months later, his sister Ernestine was deported first to Theresienstadt, then to Baranovichi. She lost her life too during the Shoah. His sister Ella and her husband Josef Bermann could emigrate and survive. Josef Bermann died 1949 in New York, Ella Bermann in 1962 also in New York. Also their two sons could survive.
	Ida Metzl née Fried	Šternberkova 1357/10 (Holešovice-Bubny)	Ida Metzl née Fried was born on 2 August 1887 in Tábor in Bohemia. She was married to Gustav Metzl from Vienna. It is not known, when the couple moved to Prague. Their last residence before deportation was in Prague VII, Šternberkova 10. On 28 April 1942, Ida Metzl and her husband were deported to Theresienstadt concentration camp by transport Ao. Her transport number was 995 of 1,001. Two days later, on 30 April 1942, the couple were deported to Zamość by transport As. Her transport number was 995 of 1,000. Both were murdered by the Nazi regime.
	Martin Wels	Dobrovského 375/15 (Holešovice)	Martin Wels was born on 27 June 1925. His parents were Ing. Arch. Rudolf Wels and Ida née Kohn. He had an older brother, Thomas Albert (born 1920). The last residence of the family before deportation was in Prague XII, Mánesova 53. On 30 January 1942, Martin Wels and his parents were arrested and deported to Theresienstadt concentration camp by transport V. His transport number was 839 of 1,002. Nineteen months later, on 6 September 1943, the family was deported to Auschwitz concentration camp by transport Dm. His transport number was 2785. Mother, father and son were murdered by the Nazi regime. His brother could survive, he died in 1988 in England.
	Rudolf Wels	Dobrovského 375/15 (Holešovice)	Ing. Arch. Rudolf Wels (1892-1944) Ing. Arch. Rudolf Wels was born 28 April 1882 in Osek. His parents were Simon Wels (1853-1922) and Anežka née (Pollatschek (died in 1883). He had a sister, Anna (later Krebs), and a half brother, Otto (born 1895). He was an architect and married to Ida née Kohn. The couple had two sons, Thomas Albert (born on 7 June 1920 in Cheb) and Martin (born 1925). The last residence of the family before deportation was in Prague XII, Mánesova 53. On 30 January 1942, Ing. Arch. Rudolf Wels, his wife and his younger son were arrested and deported to Theresienstadt concentration camp by transport V. His transport number was 837 of 1,002. Nineteen months later, on 6 September 1943, the family was deported to Auschwitz concentration camp by transport Dm. His transport number was 2766. Father, mother and son were murdered by the Nazi regime. His son Thomas Albert could survive, he died on 18 September 1988 in Gloucester, England. The fate of his siblings is unknown.
	Ida Welsová née Kohn	Dobrovského 375/15 (Holešovice)	Ida Welsová née Kohn was born 6 July 1894. Her parents were Edmund Kohn Krafft (1862-1935) and Therese née Fürth (born 1871). She had four siblings: Gustav (born 1892), Ernst (born 1895), Walter (born 1897) and Ilsa (born 1903, later Mandl-von Tupay-Isertingen). She was married to Rudolf Wels. The couple had two sons, Thomas Albert (born on 7 June 1920 in Cheb) and Martin (born 1925). The last residence of the family before deportation was in Prague XII, Mánesova 53. On 30 January 1942, Ida Welsová, her husband and her younger son were arrested and deported to Theresienstadt concentration camp by transport V. Her transport number was 838 of 1,002. Nineteen months later, on 6 September 1943, the family was deported to Auschwitz concentration camp by transport Dm. Her transport number was 2767. Mother, father and son were murdered by the Nazi regime. Her son Thomas Albert could survive, he died on 18 September 1988 in Gloucester, England. Her brother Walter was killed in 1942 in Belarus. The fate of her siblings Gustav and Ilsa is unknown. Her brother Ernst could survive, he died in 1984 in Chicago.
	Eugen Wiener	Schnirchova 1353/7 (Holešovice-Bubny)	Ing. Eugen Wiener, also Evžen, was born on 14 August 1878 in Opava in the Moravian-Silesian Region. His parents were Gustav Wiener and Katharina née Toch. He had at least two brothers, Artur (born 1884) and Victor (born about 1888). He was married to Katharina née Schwarzová. The couple had at least one son, Robert. The last residence of the Wieners before deportation was in Prague VII., Malá Šternberkova 7. On 30 July 1942, Ing. Eugen Wiener and his wife were arrested and deported to Theresienstadt concentration camp by transport AAv. His transport number was 287 of 1,001. Only five days later, on 4 August 1942, the couple were deported to Maly Trostenets extermination camp by transport AAz. His transport number was 568 of 1,000. On 10 August 1942, both were ″killed by gas″. His brothers were both murdered, Artur in 1942 in Izbica, Victor in Warsaw. His son could survive. On 18 December 1987 in Tel Aviv, Robert Wiener submitted 13 death reports of relatives and friends to Yad Vashem, among them the reports about the deaths of his mother and his father.
	Katharina Wienerová née Schwarzová	Schnirchova 1353/7 (Holešovice-Bubny)	Katharina Wienerová née Schwarzová was born 10 July 1889 in Tullnerbach-Pressbaum close to Vienna. Her parents were Emil Schwarz and Ida née Mauthner. She was married to Ing. Eugen Wiener. The couple had at least one son, Robert. The last residence of the couple before deportation was in Prague VII., Malá Šternberkova 7. On 30 July 1942, Katharina Wienerová and her husband were arrested and deported to Theresienstadt concentration camp by transport AAv. Her transport number was 288 of 1,001. Five days later, on 4 August 1942, the couple were deported to Maly Trostenets extermination camp by transport AAz. Her transport number was 569 of 1,000. On 10 August 1942, both were ″killed by gas″. Their son could survive. On 18 December 1987 in Tel Aviv, he submitted the reports about the deaths of his mother and his father.

== Dates of collocations ==
According to the website of Gunter Demnig the Stolpersteine of Prague were posed on 8 October 2008, 7 November 2009, 12 June 2010, 13 to 15 July 2011 and on 17 July 2013 by the artist himself. A further collocation occurred on 28 October 2012, but is not mentioned on Demnig's page.

The Czech Stolperstein project was initiated in 2008 by the Česká unie židovské mládeže (Czech Union of Jewish Youth) and was realized with the patronage of the Mayor of Prague.

== See also ==
- List of places with Stolpersteine
- Stolpersteine in the Czech Republic
