= Architekti Pro Bono =

Architekti Pro Bono (English: Architects Pro Bono) is an initiative of Czech architects run by the Czech Chamber of Architects (Česká komora architektů - CKA), providing pro bono architectural advice and services to disaster victims and disadvantaged people, communities and organizations.

Clients contact member architects directly, either by phone or via their website. According to their circumstances, clients will receive adequate assistance, from simple advice to complete architectural services.

== Purpose ==
To provide free or discounted architectural advice and services to disaster victims and disadvantaged people, communities and organizations.

== History ==
The initiative was founded by the Czech-Australian architect Jiří Lev on June 27, 2021 on the model of Architects Assist he had established in Australia, with the aim of providing assistance to tornado victims in Hodonín and Břeclav on June 24, 2021 and the vision that pro bono services will become a regular part of architects' professional activities.

On July 12, 2021, the initiative had over 50 member studios offering the affected municipalities and their inhabitants assistance with the elaboration of projects for the reconstruction of damaged houses or the construction of new houses.

On August 3, 2021, architect Lukáš Janáč and several other architects created a follow-up initiative Obnova 21, offering free family house plans and documentation to the disaster victims.

On September 17, 2024, the CKA activated the initiative to assist with recovery from widespread floods and coordinate the work of architects in the following weeks and months, with projects well under way in early 2025 and 90 firms involved.
