= Linhart =

Linhart is a surname. For origin and meaning, see Lienhard. Notable people with the surname include:

- Alan Linhart (born 1975), U.S. musician (see Cereal Killaz)
- Anton Tomaž Linhart (1756–1795), Carniolan playwright and historian
- Buzzy Linhart (1943–2020), U.S. rock performer and musician
- Carl Linhart (1929–2022), U.S. baseball player
- Evžen Linhart (1898–1949), Czech architect and furniture designer
- Jiří Linhart (1924–2011), Czech physicist and swimmer
- Lubomír Linhart (1906–1908), Czech film historian and photography theorist
- Pedro Linhart (born 1962), Spanish golfer
- Tamir Linhart (born 1968), Israeli and U.S. Continental Indoor Soccer League player
- Tomas Linhart (born 1984), Czech ice hockey player
- Toni Linhart (1942–2013), Austrian and American football player
- Wenzel von Linhart (1821–1877), Austrian surgeon
- Zdeněk Linhart (born 1994), Czech footballer

== See also ==
- Lienhardt
- Lienhart
- Lienhard
- Linhardt
