= Wendy James (disambiguation) =

Wendy James (born 1966) is an English singer-songwriter.

Wendy James may also refer to:

- Wendy James (anthropologist) (1940–2024), British social anthropologist and academic
- Wendy James (author) (born 1966), Australian author of crime and literary fiction
