= Osek (Rokycany District) =

- Municipality
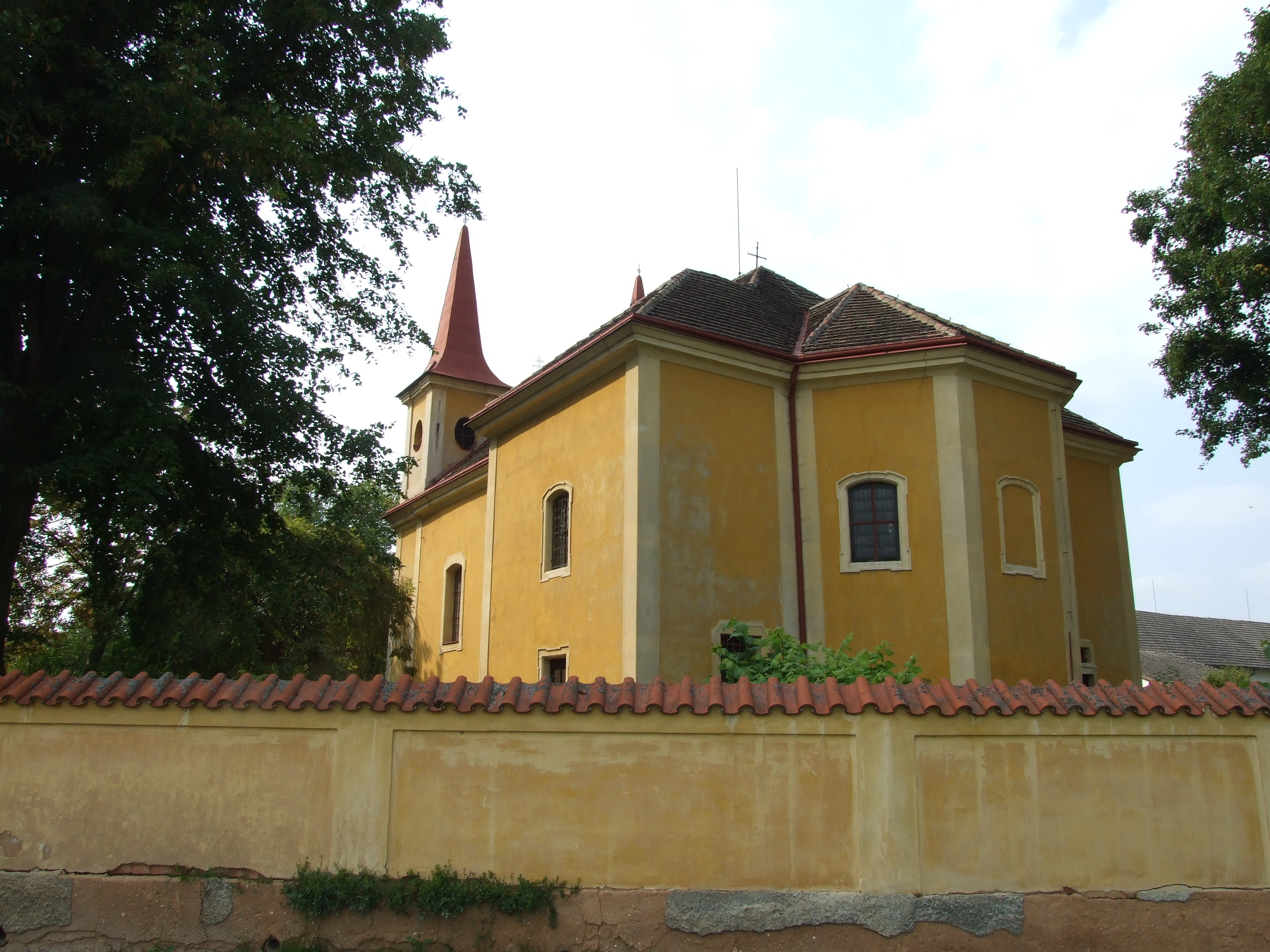
- Church of the Assumption of the Virgin Mary

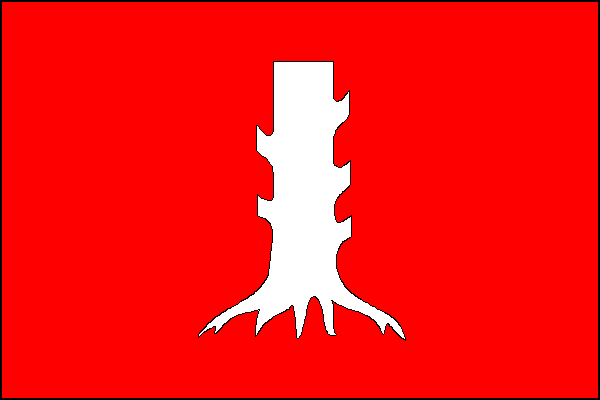
- Flag Coat of arms

- Location in the Czech Republic
- Coordinates: 49°46′38″N 13°35′27″E
- Country: Czech Republic
- Region: Plzeň
- District: Rokycany
- First mentioned: 1240

Area
  - Total: 18.07 km^{2} (6.98 sq mi)
- Elevation: 403 m (1,322 ft)

Population (2026-01-01)
  - Total: 1,448
  - Density: 80.13/km^{2} (207.5/sq mi)
- Time zone: UTC+1 (CET)
  - Summer (DST): UTC+2 (CEST)
- Postal code: 338 21
- Website: www.obecosek.cz

Osek (German: Wosek) is a municipality and village in Rokycany District in the Plzeň Region of the Czech Republic. It has about 1,400 inhabitants.

== Administrative division ==
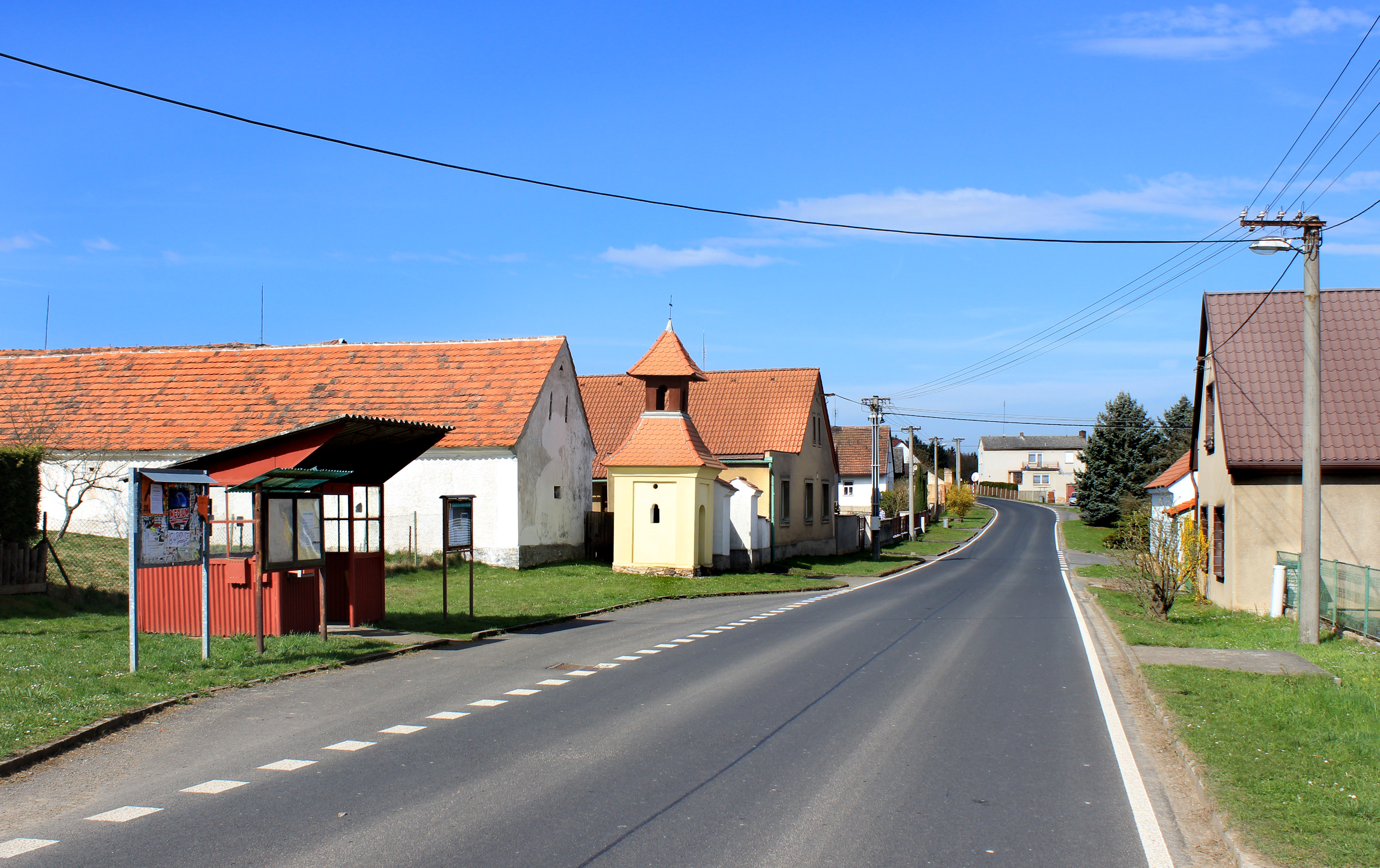
Main street in Vitinka

Osek consists of two municipal parts (in brackets population according to the 2021 census):

- Osek (1,274)
- Vitinka (153)

== Etymology ==
Osek is a common Czech toponym. The word osek denotes a cut trunk, but it also could mean a cut forest.

== Geography ==
Osek is located about 3 kilometres (2 mi) north of Rokycany and 15 km (9 mi) east of Plzeň. The western part of the municipality, formed by the built-up area and an agricultural landscape, lies in the Švihov Highlands. The eastern part formed by forests lies in the Křivoklát Highlands. The highest point is at 600 m (2,000 ft) above sea level. In the village of Osek, the hill of Kamýk at 424 m (1,391 ft) rises.

The stream Osecký potok flows through the village. There are several fishponds in the municipality; the set of ponds Karásek, Labutinka, Lukotovský and Nový is supplied by the Osecký potok.

== History ==
The first written mention of Osek is from 1240, in a deed issued by the King Wenceslaus I to the monastery of Plasy, where a man by name of Budivoj of Osek is referred to. The monastery in Plasy was founder of Osek. The village was dominated by small Gothic fort, rebuilt into a Renaissance castle in the second half of the 16th century.

In following centuries Osek was owned by several aristocratic families. Beside farming, the village specialised in iron ore mining and iron production. This local industry utilized energy from the system of ponds in Osek's proximity and charcoal from nearby forests. Iron ore mining continued until 1850. In the 19th and 20th centuries Osek remained mostly agricultural community.

The village of Vitinka was founded around 1697. It used to be traditionally a part of Osek. In 1924 an independent municipality of Vitinka was created, however in 1980 Vitinka merged again with Osek.

== Demographics ==
Historical population

Year	Pop.	±%
1869	1,447	—
1880	1,357	−6.2%
1890	1,417	+4.4%
1900	1,377	−2.8%
1910	1,339	−2.8%

Year	Pop.	±%
1921	1,295	−3.3%
1930	1,284	−0.8%
1950	1,028	−19.9%
1961	1,111	+8.1%
1970	1,078	−3.0%

Year	Pop.	±%
1980	1,068	−0.9%
1991	1,117	+4.6%
2001	1,090	−2.4%
2011	1,296	+18.9%
2021	1,427	+10.1%

Source: Censuses

== Transport ==
There are no railways or major roads passing through the municipality.

== Sights ==
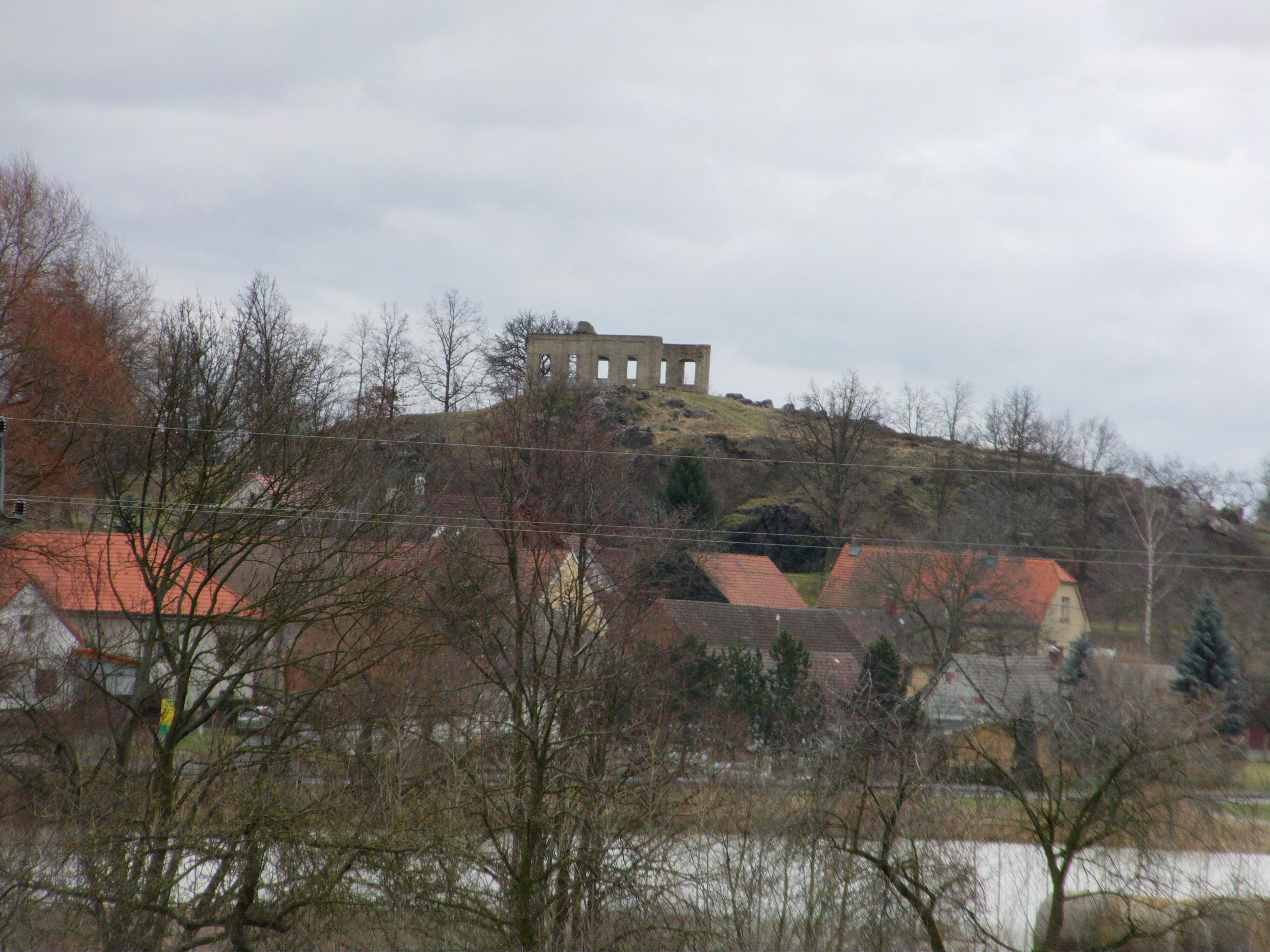
Kamýk hill

The main landmark of Osek is the Church of the Assumption of the Virgin Mary. Its Gothic presbytary dates from the mid-14th century. The nave was built in the Baroque style in 1707 by the architect Jakub Auguston.

There are the ruins of an aristocratic summer house on the top of the hill Kamýk. It was built in 1750 and desolated in 1839. A Jewish cemetery is located next to the ruins.

== Notable people ==
- Rudolf Wels (1882–1944), architect
