= Erpužice =

- Municipality
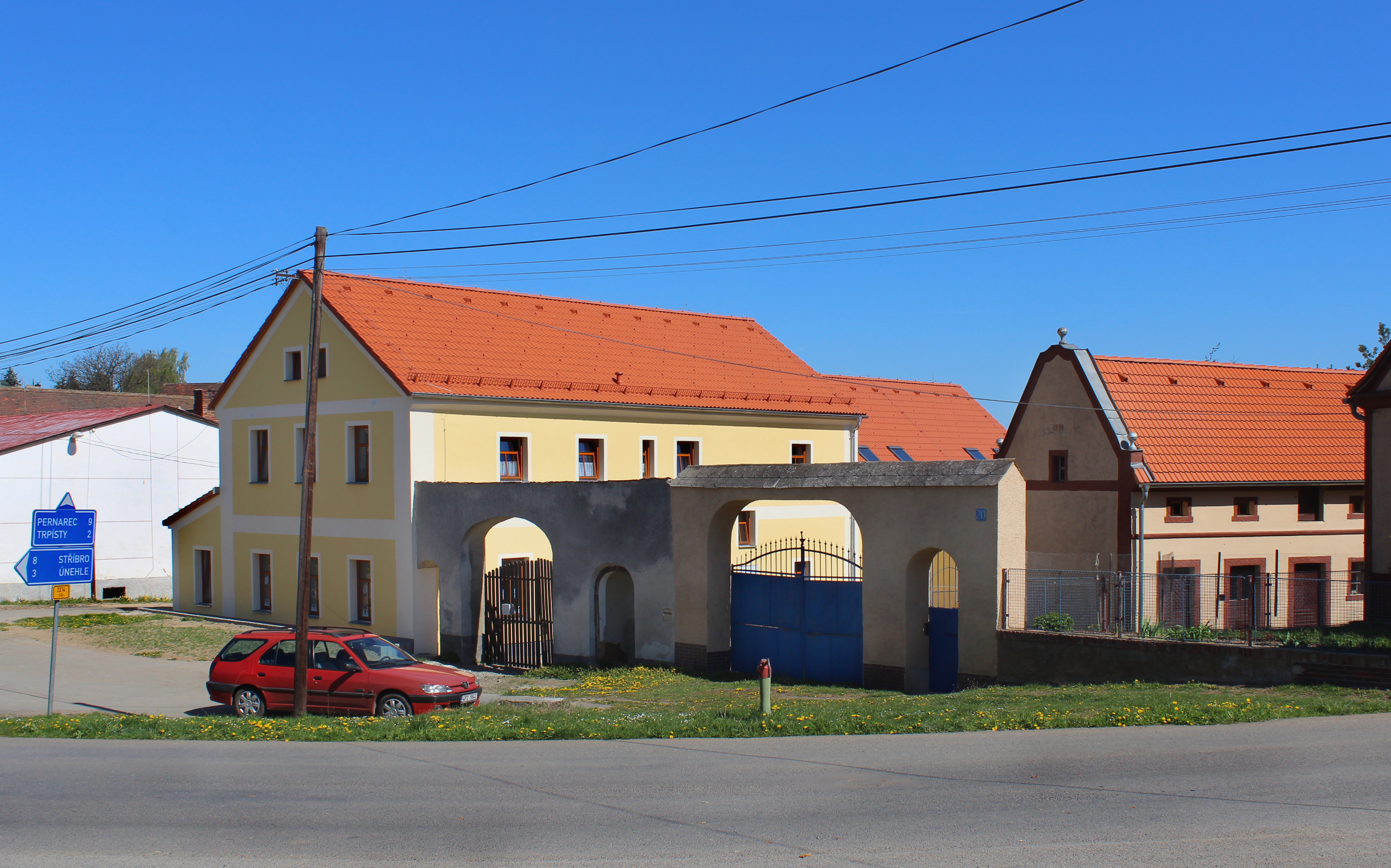
- Common in Erpužice

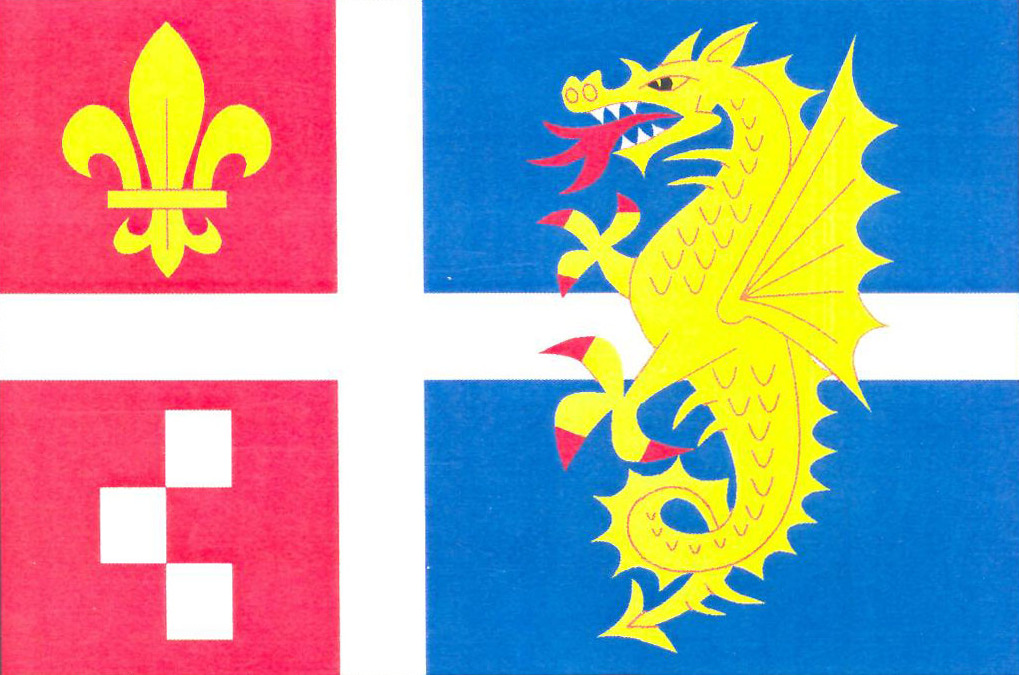
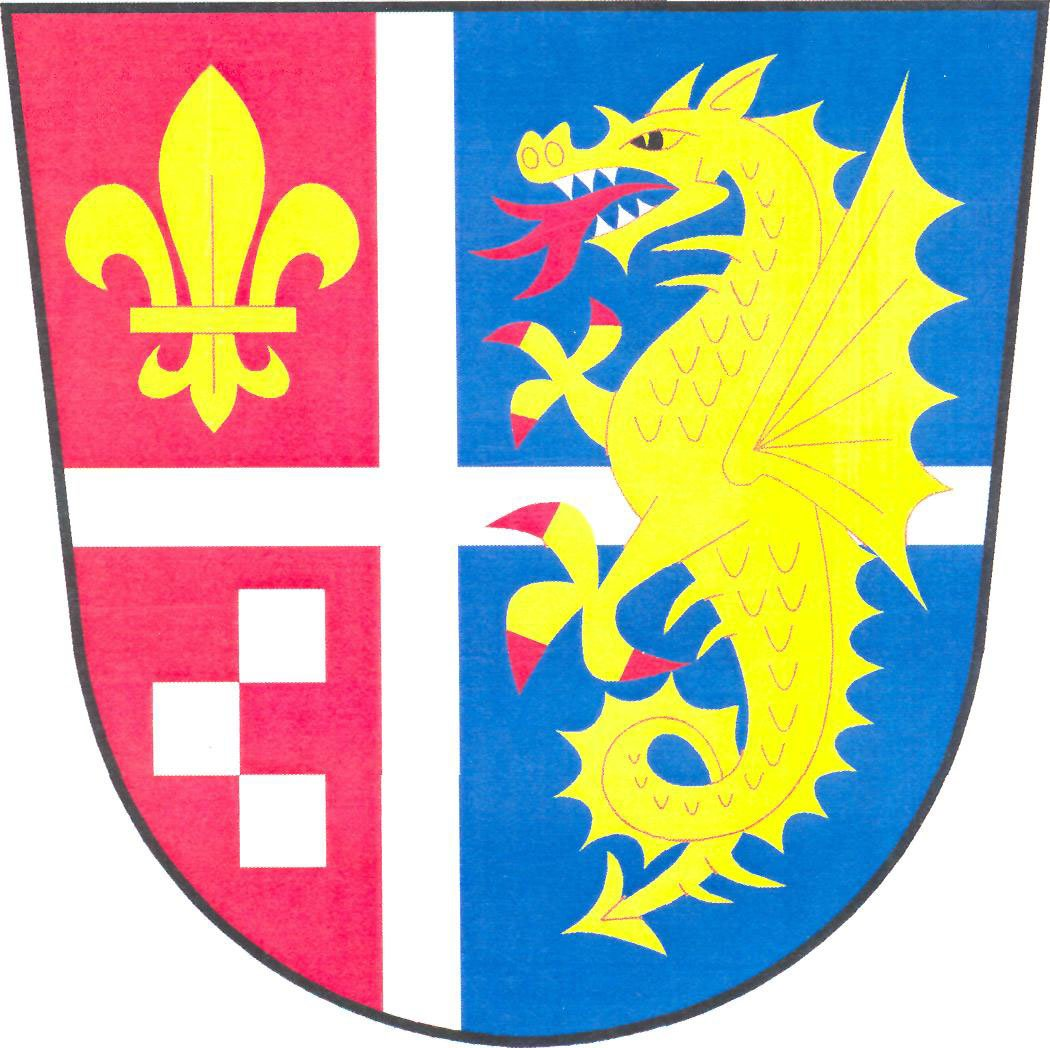
- Flag Coat of arms

- Location in the Czech Republic
- Coordinates: 49°48′25″N 12°39′0″E
- Country: Czech Republic
- Region: Plzeň
- District: Tachov
- First mentioned: 1175

Area
  - Total: 14.51 km^{2} (5.60 sq mi)
- Elevation: 460 m (1,510 ft)

Population (2026-01-01)
  - Total: 350
  - Density: 24/km^{2} (62/sq mi)
- Time zone: UTC+1 (CET)
  - Summer (DST): UTC+2 (CEST)
- Postal code: 349 01
- Website: www.obecerpuzice.cz

Erpužice (German: Welperschitz) is a municipality and village in Tachov District in the Plzeň Region of the Czech Republic. It has about 400 inhabitants.

Erpužice lies approximately 31 kilometres (19 mi) east of Tachov, 26 km (16 mi) west of Plzeň, and 104 km (65 mi) west of Prague.

== Administrative division ==
Erpužice consists of three municipal parts (in brackets population according to the 2021 census):

- Erpužice (250)
- Blahousty (33)
- Malovice (51)

== Demographics ==
Historical population
Year	Pop.	±%
1869	509	—
1880	547	+7.5%
1890	564	+3.1%
1900	566	+0.4%
1910	549	−3.0%
1921	554	+0.9%
1930	509	−8.1%
1950	288	−43.4%
1961	280	−2.8%
1970	389	+38.9%
1980	358	−8.0%
1991	316	−11.7%
2001	334	+5.7%
2011	328	−1.8%
2021	334	+1.8%
Source: Censuses

== Notable people ==
- Karl Ernstberger (1887–1972), Czech-German architect
