= Linhardt =

Linhardt is a surname.For origin and meaning, see Lienhard. Notable people with the surname include:

- Christina Linhardt, German-American singer, actor, and director
- Robert J. Linhardt, American Professor

== See also ==
- Linhart
- Lienhard
- Lienhart
- Lienhardt
- Linhardt von Hevring: a playable character in Fire Emblem: Three Houses and Fire Emblem Warriors: Three Hopes
