= Lienhart =

Lienhart is a surname. For origin and meaning, see Lienhard. Notable people with the surname include:

- Andreas Lienhart (born 1986), Austrian footballer
- Georges Lienhart (1886–1952), French World War I flying ace
- Johann Lienhart (born 1960), Austrian cyclist
- Philipp Lienhart (born 1996), Austrian footballer

== See also ==
- Lienhard
- Lienhardt
- Linhart
- Linhardt
