= The Engines of Our Ingenuity =

- Genre: Educational
- Running time: 3–4 minutes
- Country of origin: United States
- Language: English
- Home station: KUHF-FM
- Created by: John H. Lienhard IV
- Original release: 1988
- Website: https://www.uh.edu/engines/
- Podcast: https://www.houstonpublicmedia.org/podcasts/engines-of-our-ingenuity/

The Engines of Our Ingenuity is a daily radio series produced jointly by KUHF-FM, Houston, Texas, and the University of Houston.

The series tells the story of human invention and creativity in 3 1/2 minute essays. The stories center on engineering and technology, but they venture freely into mathematics, science, literature, medicine, music, art and other areas. The program thus reveals much of the cultural history that is formed by technology and other creative enterprises, and it reveals how culture in turn shapes technology and science. The program airs nationally on many public radio stations, and on other outlets.

== History ==
The Engines of Our Ingenuity was first aired on January 4, 1988. It reached 3000 finished episodes in March, 2015. The series was founded by John H. Lienhard IV, now retired Professor of Mechanical Engineering at the University of Houston and member of the National Academy of Engineering. The program is now done by a group of experts in several fields, including Lienhard.

== Reach ==
The program airs nationally on many public radio stations, and on other outlets.

At any one time, the program is likely to be airing on 40 or so stations in the United States, and on such specialized outlets as Armed Forces Radio and the International Space Station, and occasional overseas radio. The program is made available free of charge and reporting of its use is not enforceable.

Part of the growing influence of the series has been an initiative to create a Spanish-language version of the program, Invenciones de la Inventiva. These are episodes that have been translated into Spanish and are airing on station KNTU.

== Website ==
The Engines of Our Ingenuity website features complete audio for all the episodes of the program, as well as complete illustrated transcripts. It also includes variety of value-added items: related technical papers, books, and other sources. For a complete list of Engines topics, see the list of titles and keywords.

== Awards ==
Engines has received many awards including the Ralph Coats Roe Medal of ASME to Lienhard for developing the program and the Ralph Coats Roe Award from the ASEE.

== Related reading ==
Lienhard has published three books that reflect the content of Engines.

- Lienhard, J.H. (2000). The Engines of Our Ingenuity. NY: Oxford University Press ISBN 0-195-16731-7
- Lienhard, J.H. (2003). Inventing Modern: Growing Up with X-Rays, Skyscrapers and Tailfins. NY: Oxford University Press ISBN 0-195-16032-0
- Lienhard, J.H. (2006). How Invention Begins: Echoes of Old Voices in the Rise of New Machines. NY: Oxford University Press ISBN 0-195-34120-1
