= Godfrey Lienhardt =

British anthropologist

Ronald Godfrey Lienhardt (17 January 1921 – 9 November 1993) was a British anthropologist. He took many photographs of the Dinka people he studied. He wrote about their religion in Divinity and Experience: the Religion of the Dinka.

== Life and field work ==
Born in Bradford, West Riding of Yorkshire, England, of mixed Swiss and Yorkshire parentage, he went to Cambridge University in 1939, where he read English at Downing College under F. R. Leavis until he was called up and became a transport officer, stationed in Africa. He was followed in 1946 to Downing by his brother Peter Lienhardt, who also read English and became an anthropologist. After returning to civilian life, Godfrey's academic interests were redirected to anthropology by an encounter with Edward Evans-Pritchard, under whom he subsequently studied at Oxford.

His chosen field of research were the Dinka of southern Sudan, a people closely related to the Nuer studied by his mentor, (1947–50) and the Anuak (1952-1954). His work on the former, culminating in Divinity and Experience: the Religion of the Dinka, is regarded as unsurpassed as a study of African religion. His central, ultimately Durkheimian premise here is that religion is not reducible to a matter of beliefs and practices, but rather to a complex set of natural and social practices. His methodology shows an acute sensitivity to the dangers of translating key words in an indigenous lexicon concerning belief and religion, for example, into Western languages.

Sudan drifted into a civil war, and many of the native people he had got to know were swept up in the chronic violence of the area. Lienhardt found writing about his field increasingly difficult, particularly since he found himself at odds with the rising vogue for theory in anthropology, which overtook the practice of ethnological description.

The dilemma he faced in struggling with expectations that he should replace Evans-Pritchard in the chair of anthropology at Oxford informed Dan Davin's novel Brides of Price (1972).

He died, aged 72, of complications from pneumonia.

== Honours ==
In 1988, Lienhardt was presented with a Festschrift: it was titled "Vernacular Christianity: essays in the social anthropology of religion presented to Godfrey Lienhardt" and was edited by Wendy James and Douglas H. Johnson.

== Bibliography ==
- Divinity and experience: The religion of the Dinka, Oxford University Press, 1961
- Social anthropology, Oxford University Press, 1964
- T. M. S. Evens, 'Contradiction and Choice among the Dinka and in Genesis,' in his Anthropology as ethics: nondualism and the conduct of sacrifice, Berghahn Books, 2008
- Peter Rivière, 'Lienhardt, (Ronald) Godfrey (1921–1993)', Oxford Dictionary of National Biography September 2004.
- Mary Douglas, 'Obituary:Godfrey Lienhardt,' in Anthropology Today, 10, 1, 1994, reprinted in Mary Douglas, Implicit meanings: selected essays in anthropology, in Mary Douglas:Collected Works, Routledge, 2002, vol.5, pp. 188–198
- Douglas H.Johnson, 'Obituary: Godfrey Lienhardt', in The Independent 17 November 1993
- An excerpt from Divinity and Experience was included in the Penguin Books anthology Rules and Meanings (1973).
