= Wendy James (anthropologist) =

British social anthropologist and academic (1940–2024)

Wendy James CBE FRAI FBA
- Born: Wendy Rosalind James; 4 February 1940
- Died: 27 April 2024 (aged 84)
- Title: Professor of Social Anthropology
- Spouse: Douglas H. Johnson (m. 1977)
- Children: 2

Academic background
- Education: Kelsick Grammar School
- Alma mater: St Hugh's College, Oxford
- Thesis: Principles of social organisation among the Uduk speaking people of the southern Fung region, Republic of the Sudan (1970)

Academic work
- Discipline: Anthropology
- Sub-discipline: Social Anthropology; Africa; Sudan; Ethiopia; Ethnography; History of anthropology
- Institutions: University of Khartoum; St Hugh's College, Oxford; University of Bergen; St Cross College, Oxford; University of Oxford

Wendy Rosalind James, CBE, FRAI, FBA (4 February 1940 – 27 April 2024) was a British social anthropologist and academic. She was Professor of Social Anthropology at the University of Oxford from 1996 to 2007, and President of the Royal Anthropological Institute from 2001 to 2004.

== Early life and education ==
James was born on 4 February 1940 in Timperley, Cheshire, England, to William Stanley James and Isabel James (née Lunt). She was educated at Kelsick School, a grammar school in Ambleside, Cumbria. Her father was a secondary school science teacher, who also worked in a number of Commonwealth countries to assist with teacher training. She studied geography at St Hugh's College, Oxford, graduating with a Bachelor of Arts (BA) in 1962.

James's interest in Africa was developed through the stories her father told her about his time working in Uganda and her interest in anthropology was sparked during a "'hands-on' introductory course at the Pitt Rivers Museum" in Oxford during her undergraduate degree. She therefore changed direction and remained at St Hugh's College studying anthropology, completing a Bachelor of Letters (BLitt) degree in 1964; despite its name, the BLitt as a postgraduate degree. She undertook postgraduate research on a part-time basis at Oxford, completing her Doctor of Philosophy (DPhil) degree in 1970. Her doctoral dissertation was titled "Principles of social organisation among the Uduk speaking people of the southern Fung region, Republic of the Sudan".

== Academic career ==
From 1964 to 1969, James was a lecturer in social anthropology at the University of Khartoum in Sudan. During this time, she "conducted traditional ethnographic research among the Uduk people living in the Blue Nile region along the Sudan/Ethiopian border". From 1969 to 1971, she was a Leverhulme research Fellow at St Hugh's College, Oxford. Between 1971 and 1972, she was a visiting lecturer at the University of Bergen.

In 1972, James was elected a fellow of St Cross College, Oxford, and appointed a University Lecturer in social anthropology at Oxford's School of Anthropology. She was awarded a Title of Distinction as Professor of Social Anthropology in July 1996. In 2007, she retired from full-time academia and was appointed an emeritus fellow of St Cross College.

As an anthropologist, James was formed in part by her family upbringing: both her father's experienced working in different countries and her parents' vegetarianism which exposed her to cross-border solidarity when vegetarianism was rare. She undertook her doctoral fieldwork while also working as an academic in the same country which meant that she was neither a distant observer nor was she immersed among the Uduk people; she was an intermittent participant observer with additional experience of the wider Sudanese tensions. This contrasted with the continuous immersion typical of classical fieldwork and was seen as a "drawback or deficiency" by senior colleagues, but it also established a foundation for her future approaches. She was grounded within the Oxford school but also worked interdisciplinarily with neighbouring fields such as history, philosophy, literature, and archaeology, which was unusual at the time. This latter interest was demonstrated in her work as part of a cross-disciplinary team to publish some unpublished work of R. G. Collingwood, an Oxford University philosopher, historian and archaeologist who was from James's own corner of England.

Building on her doctorate, James continued her ethnographic research of the Uruk people and Sudan, publishing three monographs: Kwanim Pa: The Making of the Uduk People (1979), The Listening Ebony: Moral Knowledge, Religion and Power among the Uduk of Sudan (1988), and War and Survival in Sudan's Frontierlands: Voices from the Blue Nile (2007). She also interested in the history and development of anthropology with edited related to E. E. Evans-Pritchard, Godfrey Lienhardt and Marcel Mauss, as well as a collaborative rescue of the writings Juan Maria Schuver, a 19th-century Dutch traveller and adventurer. Near the end of her career, she also took an interest in bridging social anthropology and evolutionary biology, and contributed to the British Academy's 'From Lucy to Language' research project on human cognitive and social evolution through the co-edited Early Human Kinship: From Sex to Social Reproduction (2008) volume.

In addition to her university positions, James held a number of appointments. She was President of the Royal Anthropological Institute from 2001 to 2004. She was Vice-President of the British Institute in Eastern Africa from 2001 to 2011. She worked as an occasional consultant to bodies such as the United Nations Operation Lifeline Sudan, the United Nations High Commissioner for Refugees, the United Kingdom's Foreign and Commonwealth Office.

== Personal life and death ==
In 1977, James married Douglas H. Johnson, a British historian and academic. Together, they had two children: one son and one daughter.

James died after a long illness on 27 April 2024, at the age of 84.

== Honours ==
James was awarded the Amaury Talbot Prize for African Anthropology by the Royal Anthropological Institute for her monograph The Listening Ebony: Moral Knowledge, Religion and Power among the Uduk of Sudan in 1988. In 2005, she was awarded an honorary Dr Scientiarum Anthropologicarum (DSc) degree by the University of Copenhagen. She was awarded the Rivers Memorial Medal by the Royal Anthropological Institute in 2009.

In 1999, James was elected a Fellow of the British Academy (FBA), the United Kingdom's national academy for the humanities and social sciences. In the 2011 Queen's Birthday Honours, she was appointed a Commander of the Order of the British Empire (CBE) "for services to scholarship".

In 2023, a academic post was endowed in her honour at the University of Oxford titled the "Wendy James Associate Professorship in Evolutionary Anthropology"; it is also associated with a tutorial fellowship at her alma mater St Hugh's College, Oxford.

== Selected works ==
- Cunnison, Ian; James, Wendy, eds. (1972). Essays in Sudan ethnography: presented to Sir Edward Evans-Pritchard. London: Hurst. ISBN 978-0900966545.
- James, Wendy (1979). 'Kwanim Pa: the making of the Uduk people; an ethnographic study of survival in the Sudan-Ethiopian borderlands. Oxford: Clarendon Press. ISBN 978-0198231943.
- Donham, Donald; James, Wendy, eds. (1986). The southern marches of imperial Ethiopia: essays in history and social anthropology (1st ed.). Cambridge: Cambridge University Press. ISBN 978-0521322379.
- James, Wendy (1988). The listening ebony: moral knowledge, religion, and power among the Uduk of Sudan. Oxford: Clarendon Press. ISBN 978-0198234036.
- James, Wendy; Johnson, Douglas H., eds. (1988). Vernacular Christianity: essays in the social anthropology of religion presented to Godfrey Lienhardt. New York: Lilian Barber Press. ISBN 978-0936508238.
- James, Wendy, ed. (1995). The pursuit of certainty: religious and cultural formulations. London: Routledge. ISBN 978-0415107907.
- James, Wendy; Baumann, Gerd; Johnson, Douglas H., eds. (1996). Juan Maria Schuver's Travels in North East Africa 1880-1883. London: Hakluyt Society.
- James, Wendy, ed. (1998). Marcel Mauss: a centenary tribute. New York: Berghahn Books. ISBN 978-1571817037.
- James, Wendy (1999). The listening ebony: moral knowledge, religion, and power among the Uduk of Sudan (Paperback ed.). Oxford: Oxford University Press. ISBN 978-0198234166.
- Dresch, Paul; James, Wendy; Parkin, David, eds. (2000). Anthropologists in a wider world: essays on field research. New York: Berghahn Books. ISBN 978-1571817990.
- Donham, Donald L.; James, Wendy, eds. (2002). The southern marches of imperial Ethiopia: essays in history and social anthropology (2nd ed.). Oxford: James Currey. ISBN 978-0821414491.
- James, Wendy; Donham, Donald L.; Kurimoto, Eisei, eds. (2002). Remapping Ethiopia: socialism and after. Oxford: J. Currey. ISBN 978-0821414477.
- James, Wendy (2003). The ceremonial animal: a new portrait of anthropology. Oxford: Oxford University Press. ISBN 978-0199263332.
- James, Wendy; Mills, David, eds. (2005). The qualities of time: anthropological approaches. Oxford: Berg. ISBN 978-1845200459.
- Collingwood, R. G. (2005). Boucher, David; James, Wendy; Smallwood, Philip (eds.). The Philosophy of Enchantment: Studies in Folktale, Cultural Criticism, and Anthropology. Oxford: Clarendon. ISBN 978-0199262533.
- James, Wendy (2007). War and survival in Sudan's frontierlands: voices from the Blue Nile. Oxford: Oxford University Press. ISBN 978-0199298679.
- Allen, Nicholas J.; Callan, Hilary; Dunbar, Robin; James, Wendy, eds. (2008). Early human kinship: from sex to social reproduction. Oxford: Blackwell Publishing. ISBN 978-1405179010.
