= Douglas H. Johnson =

American scholar

Douglas Hamilton Johnson is an American scholar who lives in Britain who specialises in the history of North East Africa, Sudan and the Southern Sudan.

== Work in the Sudan ==
Johnson worked to support the 2003 Sudan Comprehensive Peace Agreement negotiations over the Three Areas (Abyei, Nuba Mountains and Blue Nile). In 2005 he was a member of the Abyei Boundary Commission, chaired by Donald K. Petterson, with the task of settling the borders of Abyei, a district disputed between the Sudan and the newly self-governing South Sudan, and was one of the five independent experts tasked with presenting the Commission's final report.

Since then, he has advised the Government of South Sudan on North-South boundary issues.

== Personal life ==
In 1977, Johnson married Wendy James, a British anthropologist and academic. They have a son and a daughter.

== Selected publications ==
- South Sudan: A New History for a New Nation, Ohio University Press (Ohio Short Histories of Africa series), 2016, ISBN 978-0-8214-2242-7
- “Decolonizing the Borders in Sudan: Ethnic Territories and National Development”, in Empire, Development and Colonialism: The Past in the Present, (Mark Duffield & Vernon Hewitt, eds), Woodbrige & Rochester NY: James Currey, 2009, ISBN 978-1-84701-011-7
- “Tribe or Nationality? The Sudanese Diaspora and the Kenyan Nubis”, Journal of Eastern African Studies, Volume 3, Number 1, pp. 112–31, 2009
- “Political Intelligence, Colonial Ethnography and Analytical Anthropology in the Sudan”, Ordering Africa: Anthropology, European Imperialism and the Politics of Knowledge (Helen Tilley & Robert Gordon, eds), Manchester: Manchester University Press, 2007 ISBN 978-0-7190-6239-1
- “Darfur: Peace, Genocide and Crimes against Humanity in Sudan”, in Violence, Political Culture & Development in Africa (Preben Kaarsholm, ed), Oxford: James Currey, 2006, ISBN 978-0-85255-894-2
- The Root Causes of Sudan's Civil Wars, James Currey: Oxford, 2003, ISBN 978-0-85255-392-3
- Editor, "Series B, Volume 5 (Sudan)" in British Documents on the End of Empire, 1998
  - Part I 1942-1950 ISBN 0-11-290563-3
  - Part II 1951-1956, ISBN 0-11-290564-1
- "The Sudan People’s Liberation Army and the Problem of Factionalism" in African Guerrillas (Christopher Clapham, ed). Oxford: James Currey, 1998, ISBN 978-0-85255-815-7
- Joanna Macrae, Mark Bradbury, Susanne Jaspars, Douglas Johnson & Mark Duffield, "Conflict, the Continuum and Chronic Emergencies: A Critical Analysis of the Scope for Linking Relief, Rehabilitation and Development Planning in Sudan" in Disasters, Volume 21 Issue 3, Pages 223 - 243, September 1997
- Karim, Ataul, Mark Duffield, Susanne Jaspars, Aldo Benini, Joanna Macrae, Mark Bradbury, Douglas Johnson & George Larbi. Operation Lifeline Sudan (OLS): a review (Geneva: Department of Humanitarian Affairs, 1996)
- Wendy James, Gerd Baumann & Douglas Johnson, eds, Juan Maria Schuver's Travels in North East Africa, 1880-1883, London: The Hakluyt Society, 1996, ISBN 0-904180-34-4
- Editor, C.A. Willis, The Upper Nile Province Handbook: A Report on Peoples and Government in the Southern Sudan, 1931, Oriental and African Archives 3, Oxford: Oxford University Press for the British Academy, 1995, ISBN 978-0-19-726146-0
- David M. Anderson & Douglas H. Johnson, eds, Revealing Prophets: Prophecy in Eastern African History, London: James Currey, 1995, ISBN 978-0-85255-718-1
- Nuer Prophets: A History of Prophecy from the Upper Nile in the Nineteenth and Twentieth Centuries, Oxford: Clarendon Press, 1994, ISBN 978-0-19-823367-1
- Editor, Governing the Nuer: Documents by Percy Coriat on Nuer History and Ethnography, 1922-1931, Oxford: JASO, 1993, ISBN 1-870047-45-1
- "Salim Wilson: The Black Evangelist of the North", Journal of Religion in Africa, Volume 21, Number 1, pp. 26–41, 1991
- "Criminal Secrecy: The Case of the Zande 'Secret Societies'" in Past & Present, Volume 130, Number 1, pp. 170–200, 1991
- “Political Ecology in the Upper Nile: The Twentieth Century Expansion of the Pastoral ‘Common Economy’”, Journal of African History, Volume 30, Number 3, pp. 463-86, 1989
- Douglas H. Johnson & David M. Anderson, eds, The Ecology of Survival: Case Studies from Northeast African History, London: Lester Crook Academic Publishing, 1988, ISBN 1-870915-00-3
- Wendy James & Douglas H. Johnson, eds, Vernacular Christianity: Essays in the Social Anthropology of Religion, Oxford: JASO, 1988, ISBN 1-870047-30-3
- "Sudanese Military Slavery from the Eighteenth to the Twentieth Century" in Slavery and Other Forms of Unfree Labour (Léonie J. Archer, ed), London: Routledge, 1988 ISBN 0-415-00203-6
- “On the Nilotic Frontier: Imperial Ethiopia in the Southern Sudan, 1898-1936”, in The Southern Marches of Imperial Ethiopia: Essays in History and Social Anthropology (D. Donham & Wendy James, eds), Cambridge: Cambridge University Press, 1986 (paperback Oxford: James Currey, 2002 ISBN 978-0-85255-794-5)
- “The Death of Gordon: a Victorian Myth”, Journal of Imperial and Commonwealth History, Volume 10, Number 2, pp. 285–310, 1982
- “Tribal Boundaries and Border Wars: Nuer-Dinka Relations in the Sobat and Zaraf Valleys, c. 1860-1976”, Journal of African History, Volume 23, Number 2, pp. 183–203, 1982
- "Evans-Pritchard, The Nuer, and the Sudan Political Service" in African Affairs, Volume 81, Number 323, pp. 231–246, 1982
- "History and Prophecy among the Nuer of the Southern Sudan", PhD thesis, UCLA, University Microfilms International, Ann Arbor, Mich., 1980
