= Karl Ernstberger =

German Bohemian architect

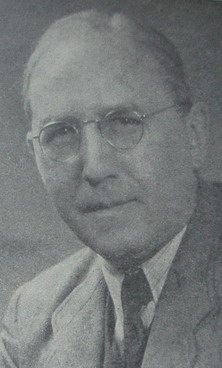
Karl Ernstberger

Karl Ernstberger (25 September 1887 – 25 November 1972) was a German Bohemian architect active in western Bohemia, predominantly in Karlovy Vary.

== Life ==
Ernstberger was born on 25 September 1887 in Malovice. He had studied at the Art Academy in Vienna, under professor Otto Wagner. After the studies he worked for architect Leopold Bauer and helped to design buildings of Austro-Hungarian National Bank in Vienna, Priesnitz spa (Sanatorium Priessnitz) in Lázně Jeseník and commerce chamber house in Opava. In 1913 he became independent architect (together with Kilian Köhler). Their designs for the government building (Landtag) in Chernivtsi (Czernowitz) in Bukowina and for the National Library and Museum in Sofia, Bulgaria, obtained awards.

At the beginning World War I Ernstberger was sent to the Eastern Front and a member of a Kaiserjäger (mountain infantry) unit and participated in the Battle of Galicia. In 1917 he was made the leader of a group building monuments of fallen soldiers (Denkmal-Bauabteilung). He designed a monument of mountain infantry in Bolzano, their museum in Runkelstein Castle in what was Austro-Hungarian Tyrol and their monument and cemetery in Huijcze Galicia.

After the war, in 1918, Ernstberger returned to Czechoslovakia and set up an office in Stříbro, together with his brother Joseph. Among others he realized student dormitory for the monastery in Svatá Anna, a housing settlement in Planá, shoe factory building in Černošín and several school buildings. In 1924 Ernstberger moved to Karlovy Vary and here, as a prominent local representative of Art Nouveau and of early modernism designed or reconstructed several hotels: Loib (today Grandhotel Central) in 1924–25, Grandhotel Bad (today Sevastopol) in 1926 and Wolker in 1929–30. He also designed several villas in Art Deco style. The most important work of this period is a church building in village Dalovice (1929) having a modern style tower. Together with Bohuslav Fuchs designed sanatorium Morava in Tatranská Lomnica ^{photos}. In 1933 a watchtower Bleiberg designed by him was erected in Bublava. In 1939–40 he realized several housing settlements for railway company workers.

In 1945 his house and office in Karlovy Vary were destroyed by bombing and in 1946 Ernstberger with the family were expelled into Germany. He first lived in Sugenheim, then in Ansbach where he designed several buildings. At age of 65 Ernstberger retired. Later, he tried to become independent architect again in Reutlingen but the attempt failed. The second attempt, after he moved into Nuremberg, however succeeded and Ernstberger was still active in his 80s. He died in Nuremberg on 25 November 1972.

== Literature ==
- Article on Czech Wikipedia contains list of articles about Ernstberger in Czech, German and Italian.
