= Peter Lienhardt =

British social anthropologist

- Born: Peter Arnold Lienhardt; 12 March 1928; Bradford, West Riding of Yorkshire, United Kingdom
- Died: 17 May 1986 (aged 58)

Academic background
- Thesis: The Shaikhdoms of Eastern Arabia (1957)

Academic work
- Discipline: Social anthropologist
- Sub-discipline: Arab societies
- Notable students: Amitav Ghosh

Peter Arnold Lienhardt (12 March 1928 – 17 March 1986) was a British social anthropologist.

== Life ==
Lienhardt was born in Bradford on 12 March 1928 to Godfrey Lienhardt and Jennie Liendhart (née Benn). He was educated at Batley Grammar School and, like his brother Godfrey Lienhardt, at Downing College, Cambridge, where he studied English, Arabic and Persian. After military service in the Royal Air Force he undertook post-graduate studies in social anthropology at Lincoln College, Oxford, earning a doctorate in 1957 with a thesis on "The Shaikhdoms of Eastern Arabia".

In the mid-1950s he carried out fieldwork in Persian Gulf countries for his doctorate, and as a senior research fellow at the East African Institute for Social Research at Makerere College, Uganda, he carried out fieldwork in Zanzibar in the late 1950s. He carried out further fieldwork in Iran in the mid-1960s.

Lienhardt was appointed to a faculty lectureship in Middle Eastern sociology at the Institute of Social Anthropology, University of Oxford. He died on 17 March 1986. In 1987 the British Society for Middle Eastern Studies published a volume in his honour, The Diversity of the Muslim Community: Anthropological Essays in Memory of Peter Lienhardt, edited by Ahmed Al-Shahi.

== Work ==
- Hasani Bin Ismail, The Medicine Man: Swifa Ya Nguvumali, edited and translated by Peter Lienhardt (Oxford Library of African Literature, Clarendon Press, Oxford, 1968).
- Peter Lienhardt, Disorientations – A Society in Flux: Kuwait in the 1950s, edited by Ahmed AI-Shahi (Middle East Cultures Series 19; Reading, Ithaca Press, 1993).
- Peter Lienhardt, Shaikhdoms of Eastern Arabia, edited by Ahmed AI-Shahi (Palgrave, 2001).
