= Bradáčov =

- Municipality
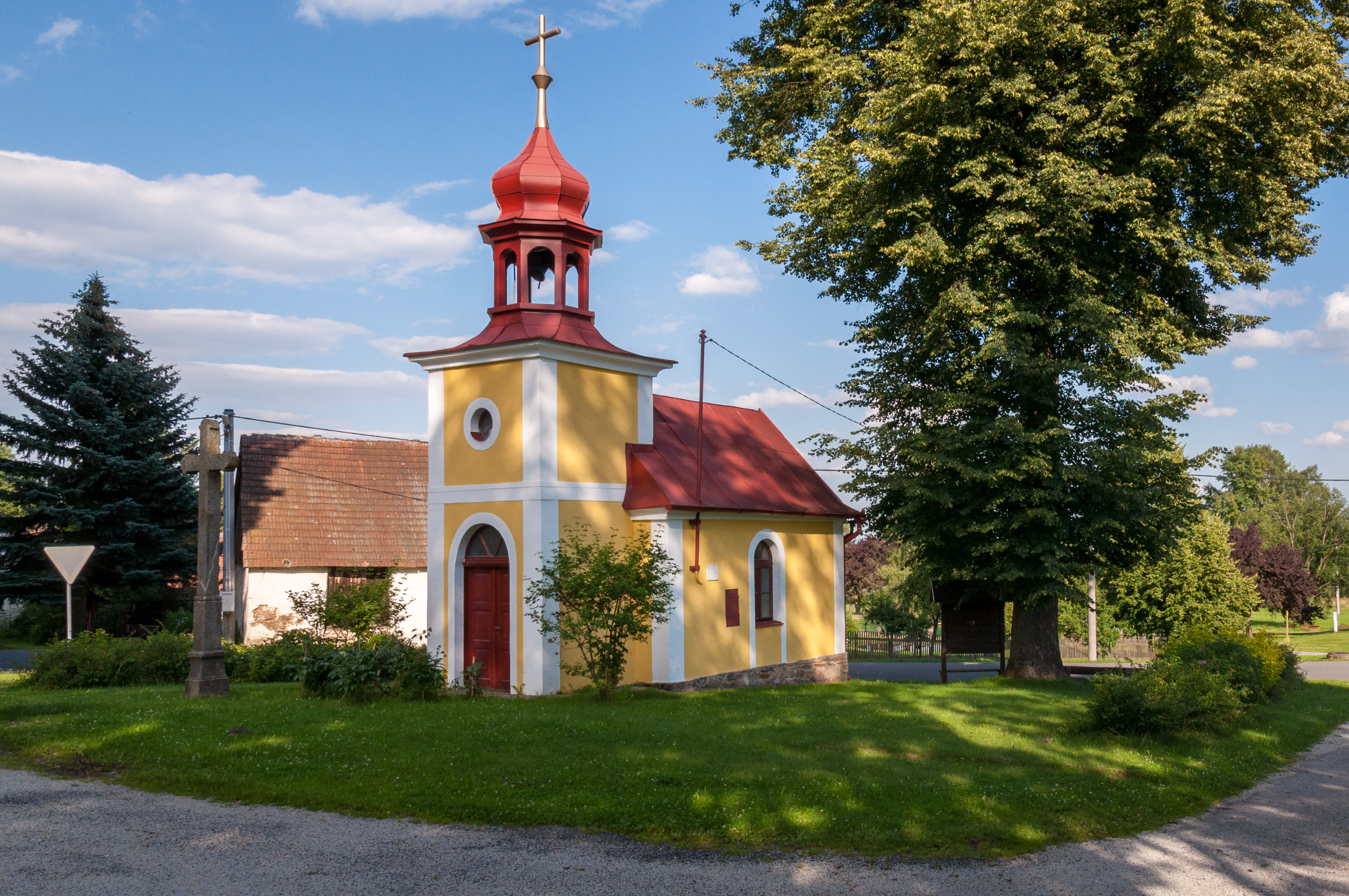
- Chapel in the centre of Bradáčov

- Location in the Czech Republic
- Coordinates: 49°29′28″N 14°52′16″E
- Country: Czech Republic
- Region: South Bohemian
- District: Tábor
- First mentioned: 1378

Area
  - Total: 4.48 km^{2} (1.73 sq mi)
- Elevation: 664 m (2,178 ft)

Population (2026-01-01)
  - Total: 42
  - Density: 9.4/km^{2} (24/sq mi)
- Time zone: UTC+1 (CET)
  - Summer (DST): UTC+2 (CEST)
- Postal code: 391 43
- Website: bradacov.cz

Bradáčov is a municipality and village in Tábor District in the South Bohemian Region of the Czech Republic. It has about 40 inhabitants.

Bradáčov lies approximately 18 kilometres (11 mi) north-east of Tábor, 65 km (40 mi) north-east of České Budějovice, and 74 km (46 mi) south-east of Prague.

== Administrative division ==
Bradáčov consists of two municipal parts (in brackets population according to the 2021 census):

- Bradáčov (29)
- Horní Světlá (13)

== Demographics ==
Historical population
Year	Pop.	±%
1869	397	—
1880	425	+7.1%
1890	391	−8.0%
1900	414	+5.9%
1910	405	−2.2%
1921	346	−14.6%
1930	340	−1.7%
1950	225	−33.8%
1961	192	−14.7%
1970	197	+2.6%
1980	138	−29.9%
1991	94	−31.9%
2001	74	−21.3%
2011	55	−25.7%
2021	42	−23.6%
Source: Censuses
