= John H. Lienhard =

American mechanical engineer

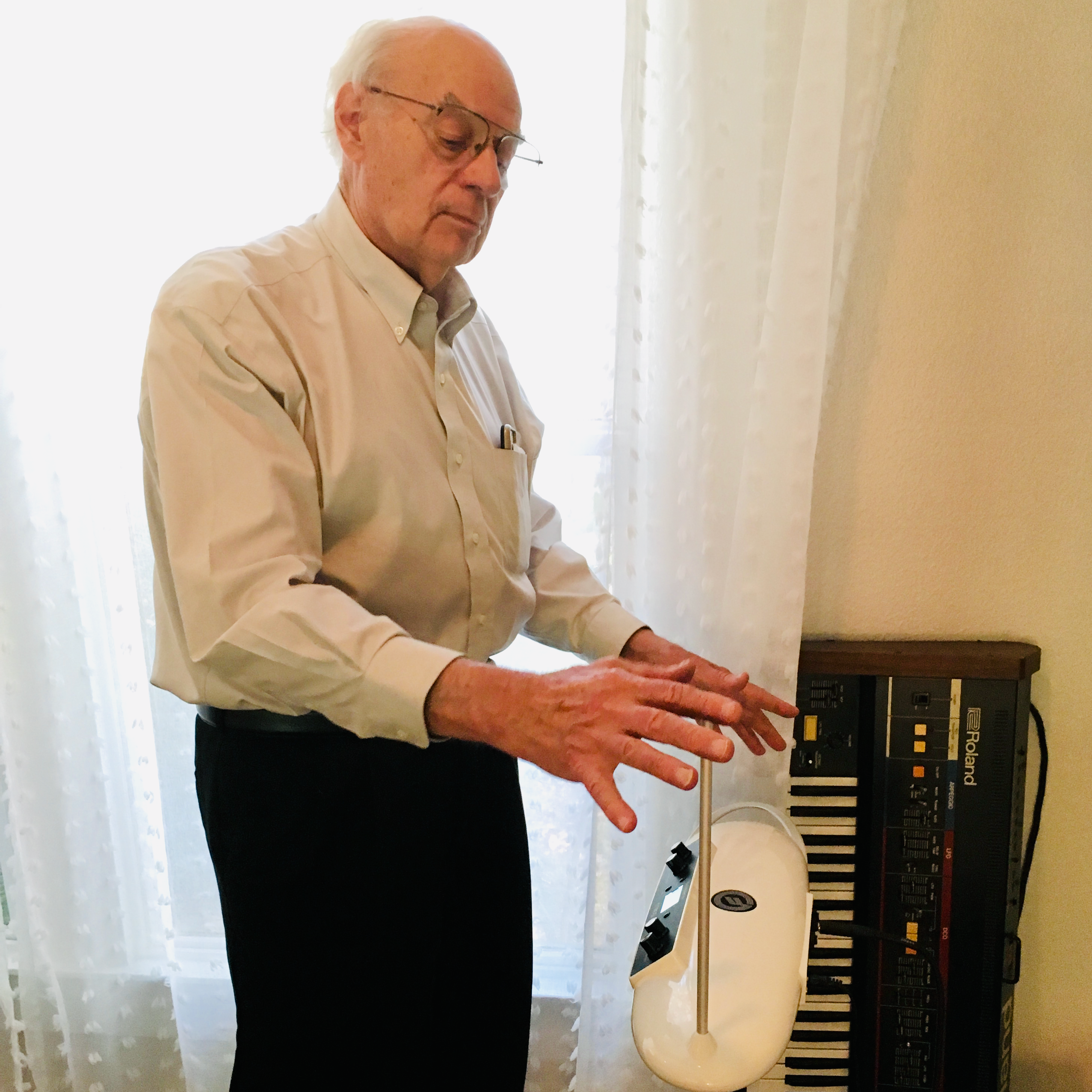
- Lienhard playing a theremin
- Born: John Henry Lienhard IV; August 17, 1930 (age 96); St. Paul, Minnesota, U.S.
- Education: University of California at Berkeley
- Known for: Public radio, heat transfer
- Spouse: Carol Ann Bratton (m. 1959)
- Children: 2, including John H. Lienhard V
- Relatives: Heinrich Lienhard (great-grandfather)
- Awards: National Academy of Engineering; ASME Thurston Lecture Award (1992)
- Scientific career
- Fields: Heat transfer, thermodynamics, history of technology
- Workplaces: University of Houston, University of Kentucky, Washington State University, University of California at Berkeley, University of Washington

John Henry Lienhard IV (born August 17, 1930) is Professor Emeritus of mechanical engineering and history at The University of Houston. He worked in heat transfer and thermodynamics for many years prior to creating the radio program The Engines of Our Ingenuity. Lienhard is a member of the US National Academy of Engineering.

== Childhood and education ==
Lienhard was born in St. Paul, Minnesota in 1930. Lienhard's father, John H. Lienhard III, served in Europe during World War I as a pilot for the United States Army then became a journalist for the St. Paul Dispatch and later a surveyor in Oregon. The Swiss pioneer Heinrich Lienhard was Lienhard's great-grandfather. His family moved to Roseburg, Oregon when Lienhard was in his teens.

Lienhard had dyslexia as a child. He overcame this disability, finishing high school in 1947 and graduating from Multnomah College with an associate degree in 1949. He then received a BS degree from the Oregon State College (1951), after which he worked for the Boeing Airplane Co. in Seattle, Washington. He continued his studies in mechanical engineering, earning his MS degree from the University of Washington (1953) before being drafted into the US Army. While in the Army, he served at the Signal Corps Laboratories in Fort Monmouth, New Jersey. He received his PhD at the University of California in 1961.

Lienhard was married to Carol Ann Bratton from 1959 until her death in 2024. They had two sons, John H. Lienhard V and Andrew J. Lienhard.

== Career ==
Lienhard is the M.D. Anderson Professor of Technology and Culture, emeritus at the University of Houston. Before he joined the University of Houston in 1980, Lienhard had been a professor at the University of Kentucky and Washington State University.

Lienhard's engineering research centered on heat transfer with phase change. His work encompassed film boiling, liquid jets, condensation (with his student Vijay K. Dhir), critical heat flux in various pool-boiling configurations, spinodal limits to liquid superheats, and rapid depressurization, among other topics. His work on critical heat flux included centrifuge measurements of boiling at high gravity. He also developed the dimensionless unit hydrograph, which is widely used to study river run-off.

Lienhard coauthored a textbook, Statistical Thermodynamics, with Professor Chang-lin Tien (1971). In 1981, he published A Heat Transfer Textbook, which has since gone through numerous editions; and, his eldest son, John H. Lienhard V, became his coauthor in 2001. They released the heat transfer textbook as a free ebook, which has been downloaded world wide.

The University of Houston presents this series about the machines that make our civilization run and the people whose ingenuity created them.

— John Lienhard, opening of Engines of Our Ingenuity

Lienhard created the radio program The Engines of Our Ingenuity in January 1988. He hoped to raise public engagement in science through stories showing that “engineering, science, and math are the work of human beings.” The series consists of short essays that explore the human side of technological history, focusing on how culture and creativity shape invention and how technology, in turn, influences society. Engines is produced by Houston Public Media and distributed nationally by National Public Radio.

Lienhard himself has written and voiced thousands of episodes since the program first aired. The success of the program led to several books authored by Lienhard that expanded on the show's themes of human inventiveness and cultural history.

== Awards and recognition ==
Lienhard was elected as Fellow of the American Society of Mechanical Engineers (ASME) in 1977 and as Fellow of the American Association for the Advancement of Science in 1989. He was recognized with the Charles Russ Richards Medal of Pi Tau Sigma and ASME in 1979, the ASME Heat Transfer Memorial Award in 1980, the ASME Ralph Coates Roe Medal in 1989 (for contributions to a public understanding of technology), the ASME Robert Henry Thurston Lecture Award in 1992, the ASEE Ralph Coates Roe Award in 1994, the ASME Engineer-Historian Award in 1998, and the ASME Edwin F. Church Medal in 2000.

ASME made Lienhard an Honorary Member in 1995.

Lienhard received a Doctorate in Humane Letters, honoris causa, from the University of Houston in 2002. Sacred Heart University awarded him an honorary doctorate in the same year.

Lienhard was elected to the US National Academy of Engineering in 2003 "for creating the awareness of engineering in the development of cultures and civilizations, and for the development of basic burnout theories in boiling and condensation".

== List of books ==
- Chang-lin Tien and John H. Lienhard, Statistical Thermodynamics, Holt, Rinehart, and Winston, New York, 1971. (revised edition, Hemisphere-McGraw-Hill, Wash D.C., 1979)
- John H. Lienhard, A Heat Transfer Textbook, Prentice-Hall, Englewood Cliffs, N.J., 1981.
- John H. Lienhard, A Heat Transfer Textbook, 2nd ed. Prentice-Hall, Englewood Cliffs, N.J., 1987.
- History of Heat Transfer: Essays in Honor of the 50th Anniversary of the ASME Heat Transfer Division, (E. T. Layton and J. H. Lienhard, eds.), ASME, New York, 1988.
- John H. Lienhard, The engines of our ingenuity: an engineer looks at technology and culture, Oxford University Press, New York, 2000.
- John H. Lienhard, Inventing modern: an engineer looks for the twentieth century, Oxford University Press, New York, 2003.
- John H. Lienhard, How invention begins: echoes of old voices in the rise of new machines, Oxford University Press, New York, 2008.
- John H. Lienhard, IV and John H. Lienhard, V A heat transfer textbook, 4th edition, Dover Publications, Mineola NY, 2011.
- John H. Lienhard, IV and John H. Lienhard, V A heat transfer textbook, 5th edition, Dover Publications, Mineola NY, 2019.
