= Evžen Linhart =

Czech architect and designer of furniture

Eugen Linhart
- Born: 20 March 1898; Kouřim, Austria-Hungary
- Died: 29 December 1949 (aged 51); Prague, Czechoslovakia
- Occupations: Architect, designer
- Partner(s): Ema Linhartová, granddaughter of Jakub Husník
- Children: Eugen Linhart, Pavel Linhart

Evžen Linhart (20 March 1898 in Kouřim – 29 December 1949 in Prague) otherwise known as Eugen Linhart was a Czech architect and designer of furniture, exponent of Czech functionalism and purism.

he was one from the members of Puristic fourth, he belongs to the representants of the architecture in association of modern Czech avant-garde Devětsil.

== See also ==
- association of modern Czech avant-garde Devětsil
- List of Czech architects
