= Jiří Löw =

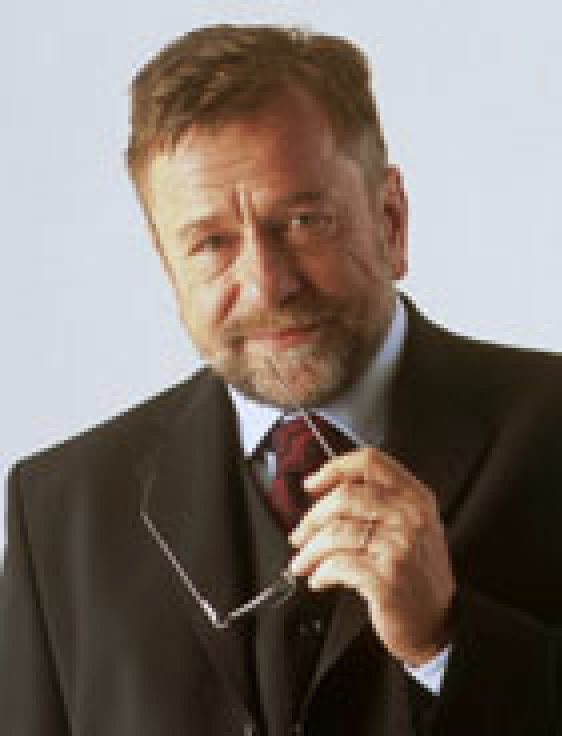
- Born: 10 April 1948 (age 78); Prague, Czechoslovakia
- Education: Brno University of Technology
- Occupations: architect, urbanist, academic
- Years active: 1974–present
- Known for: Contribution to environmental protection in the Czech Republic
- Children: Jiri Lev

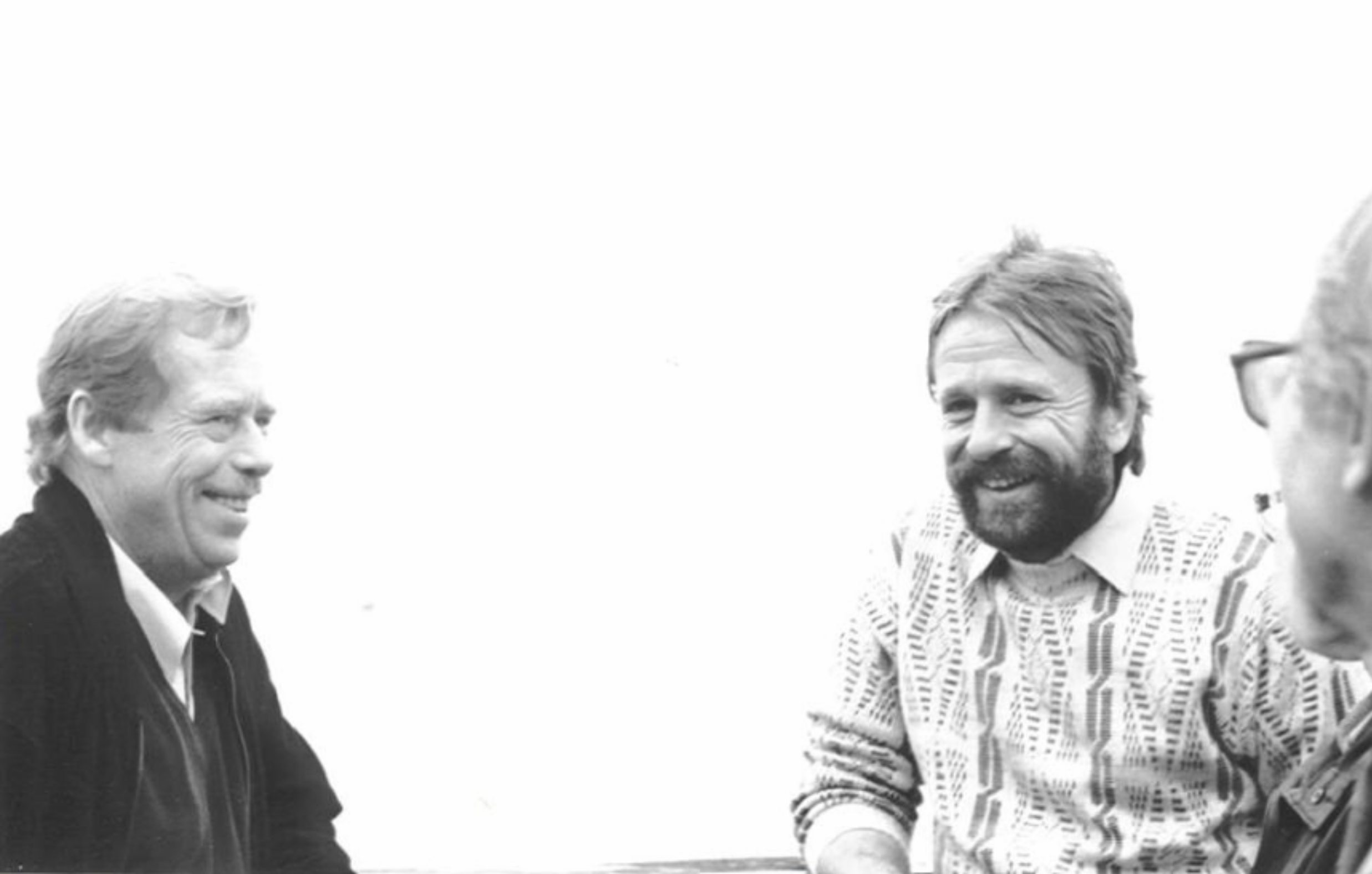
Jiří Löw (right) with president Václav Havel at Nové Mlýny reservoirs in 1990.

Jiří Löw (born 10 April 1948) is a Czech urbanist, architect, academic (associate professor) and politician. He is one of the key figures in environmental protection in the Czech Republic.

== Early life ==
Jiří Löw was born on 10 April 1948 at the Prague Castle to lawyer Leopold Löw and Kateřína Löwová.

== Academic and professional activity ==
Löw studied architecture at Brno University of Technology, starting his career as an architect and urban planner in 1974.

In 1978, he described the principles of the spatial interaction of ecosystems in the rural landscape and co-wrote the first Territorial System of Ecological Stability methodology, a key document in Czech environmental protection legislation. In 1991, he became the head of the Department of Spatial Planning and Management at the Faculty of Architecture, Brno University of Technology. In 2020 he was an external member of the Scientific Council there. In the same year, he also founded the design office Löw & co. In 1992 he was habilitated as an associate professor (docent) at the Faculty of Architecture of Brno University of Technology. In the 1990s he was instrumental to the ecological remediation of Nové Mlýny reservoirs.

Löw is the author of several books and numerous papers and articles dealing with urbanism, environmental protection and conservation.

== Political activity ==
In 1989, he became involved in the Velvet Revolution as a member of the first Brno Parliament and a co-opted member of the National Committee. From 1998 he was the chairman of the city organization of the Civic Democratic Alliance in Brno and in the same year he was elected deputy, councilor and chairman of the development commission of the City of Brno. In 2004, he was elected to the regional council for the Green for Moravia association. With the expiration of this mandate, he ended his political activity.

== Awards ==
In 2012 Löw was awarded the Igor Michal Award for "theoretical and methodological work in the field of territorial systems of ecological stability and landscape character, contribution to the formation of the Rural Development Program and lifelong pedagogical activities."

== Books (selection) ==
- Zásady pro vymezování a navrhování územních systémů ekologické stability v územně plánovací dokumentaci, 1984, Agroprojekt Brno
- Návod na navrhování územních systémů ekologické stability krajiny, 1988, Agroprojekt Brno
- Rukovět projektanta územních systémů ekologické stability, 1995, Doplněk Brno
- Krajinný ráz, with I. Míchalem, 2005, Lesnická práce Kostelec n. Č. Lesy
- Katalog typických znaků krajinného rázu, 2010
- Projevy křesťanské liturgie v kulturní krajině, with Kopeček et al., 2015, Mendlova universita Brno
- Rural Landscaping and its Tools, Akademické nakladatelství CERM, 2022
