= John H. Lienhard V =

American mechanical engineer

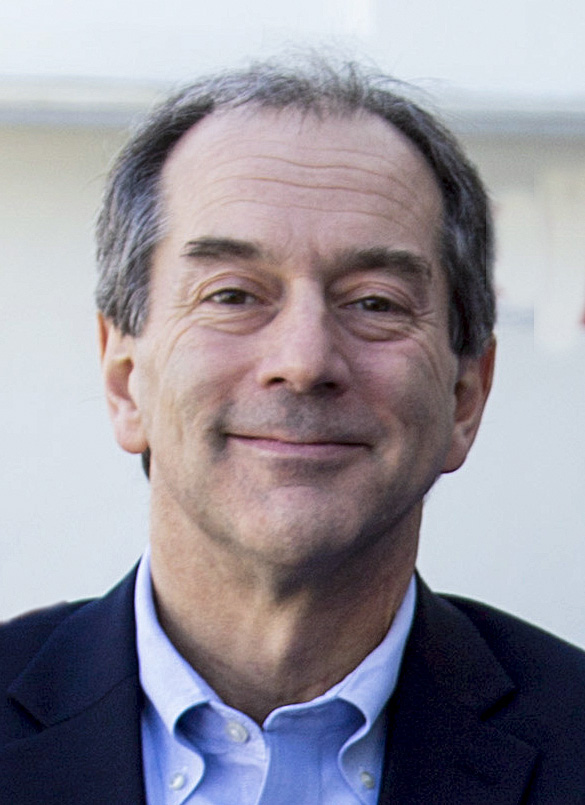
- Lienhard in February 2016
- Born: John Henry Lienhard V 1961 (age 64–65); Pullman, Washington, U.S.
- Education: University of California, Los Angeles (BS, MS); University of California, San Diego (PhD)
- Known for: desalination, free online textbook
- Father: John H. Lienhard IV
- Awards: National Academy of Engineering; Honorary Member of ASME
- Scientific career
- Fields: desalination, heat transfer, thermodynamics
- Institutions: Massachusetts Institute of Technology
- Thesis: The decay of turbulence in thermally stratified flow (1988)
- Doctoral advisor: Charles W. Van Atta
- Website: lienhard.mit.edu

John Henry Lienhard V (born 1961) is an American mechanical engineer. He is the Abdul Latif Jameel Professor of Water and Mechanical Engineering at the Massachusetts Institute of Technology. His research has focused on desalination, heat transfer, and thermodynamics. He has also written several engineering textbooks.

== Early life and education ==
Lienhard was born in 1961 in Pullman, Washington, where his father, John H. Lienhard IV, was a professor at Washington State University. His mother, Carol Ann Bratton, a violinist, was a member of the Washington State University String Quartet. The family moved to Lexington, Kentucky in 1967 when his father took a position at the University of Kentucky. Lienhard attended elementary school and high school in Lexington.

Lienhard enrolled at the University of Kentucky when he was 16. He completed his bachelor's degree in engineering at the University of California, Los Angeles in 1982 and his master's degree in heat and mass transfer at UCLA in 1984 for research on Rayleigh–Bénard instability. He then transferred to the University of California, San Diego, where he wrote his doctoral dissertation on wind tunnel measurements of strongly stratified turbulent flow, finishing in 1988. Lienhard's doctoral experiments encompassed Brunt–Väisälä frequencies up to 2.4 s^{−1} and required the development of hot-wire anemometry usable in the presence of large temperature fluctuations.

== Career ==
Lienhard joined the mechanical engineering faculty of the Massachusetts Institute of Technology in 1988, and he remained on the faculty until his retirement in 2025.

Lienhard's initial research at MIT focused on cooling by liquid jet impingement. This work included fundamental convection problems, droplet splattering, free-surface turbulence interactions, and pattern formation in the hydraulic jump. The thin boundary layer at a jet's stagnation point also provided a means of high-heat-flux engineering. In 1993, Lienhard's group reported a steady-state heat flux of ≈40 kW/cm^{2} under a high-speed water jet. They later extended this approach to arrays of jets, allowing larger areas to be cooled at high flux. In 1998, they used an array of water jets at 46 m/s to remove 1.7 kW/cm^{2} by convection alone over areas of several cm^{2}.

In the 2000s, Lienhard refocused his research on water scarcity and clean water supply, particularly on desalination technologies. He later wrote that he made this shift after reading about worldwide water scarcity and realizing that his background in transport phenomena could be applied to water purification. His group's desalination research has included topics such as energy efficiency, forward and reverse osmosis, nanofiltration, brine management, membrane distillation, humidification-dehumidification, and electrodialysis. The seawater thermophysical property correlations developed by his group have been widely cited by other researchers.

Lienhard has written hundreds of peer-reviewed research publications and has been issued more than 40 US patents. The patents have supported start-up companies from Lienhard's research group, one of which, Gradiant Corporation, grew to more than $1 billion valuation in 2023.

Lienhard helped launch several large-scale research programs at MIT. He was the founding director of the Center for Clean Water and Clean Energy (2008–2017), a research collaboration with King Fahd University of Petroleum and Minerals (KFUPM) involving four dozen faculty members at KFUPM and MIT. He was also the founding director of the Ibn Khaldun Fellowship program for Saudi Arabian Women, which each year brings several women to MIT for postdoctoral research collaborations.

In 2014, Lienhard founded the Abdul Latif Jameel Water and Food Systems Lab (J-WAFS), and he served as J-WAFS director until 2025. J-WAFS supports research by MIT faculty on water and food to address the needs of a rapidly growing population on a changing planet. Under Lienhard's leadership, J-WAFS funded more than 100 research and commercialization projects distributed across MIT's schools.

Lienhard has co-authored three textbooks, Mechanical Measurements (with T. G. Beckwith and R. D. Maragoni), Modeling and Approximation in Heat Transfer (with L. R. Glicksman), and A Heat Transfer Textbook (with his father, John H. Lienhard IV). He and his father have collaborated on the heat transfer book for decades. In 2001, they made the decision to distribute the work primarily as a free ebook, which has since been downloaded hundreds of thousands of times across the world, according to interviews with Lienhard. Lienhard has also received awards for his teaching and been recognized for his mentorship of graduate students.

== Awards and honors ==
Lienhard was elected to the U.S. National Academy of Engineering in 2026 for “advances and technological innovations in desalination”. He also received the 2024 Lifetime Achievement Award of the International Desalination and Reuse Association.

ASME made Lienhard an Honorary Member in 2025 for “sustained contributions to thermodynamic and transport process engineering through modeling, experimentation, design, and patents; for a pioneering, open-access textbook; and for leadership in sustainability research in academia”. In 2012, ASME awarded him the Technical Communities Globalization Medal for “fostering global research collaboration and technology transfer in clean water and clean energy technologies, and for international educational outreach through open-access, online distribution of educational materials, especially in developing countries.”

His other awards include the Donald Q. Kern Award of the American Institute of Chemical Engineers for process engineering (2022), the ASME Edward F. Obert Award in thermodynamics (2019), and the ASME Heat Transfer Memorial Award (2015).

Lienhard is a fellow of the American Society of Mechanical Engineers (2000), the American Association for the Advancement of Science (2018), and the American Society of Thermal and Fluid Engineers (2021).
