= Svatopluk Sládeček =

Czech architect (born 1969)

Svatopluk Sládeček (born 29 December 1969) is a Czech architect. He is known for his "figurative architecture".

== Early life and education ==
Sládeček was born on 29 December 1969 in Zlín. In 1988–1989, he studied at Academy of Arts, Architecture and Design in Prague (VŠUP), Department of Design. In 1989–1994, he studied at Academy of Arts, Architecture and Design in Prague (VŠUP), Faculty of Architecture.

== Professional experience ==
Since 1995, Sládeček has been running the New Work Studio, 1998 – member of Czech chamber of architects. In 2009 he was a chief editor of the annual publication Czech architecture 2007–2008.

== Projects ==
1995 – reconstruction of the stalls and courtyard, completion of the Portál bookstore and temporary expansion of the space (demolished) Uherské Hradiště
1997 – multi-purpose dwelling for the Konečný family, Zlín-Podhoří
1997 – house of Libor Stavjaník with a photographic atelier, reconstruction and extension, Zlín
1997 – municipal offices, Šarovy u Zlína, with L. del Maschio
1999 – house of Alice Marek, Zlín-Štípa
1999 – Doubravkacottage – Horní Sokoloves, Chotěboř, with Luděk del Maschio
2002 – sheltered workshop with living quarters, Fryšták-Hrádek
2002 – addition to the house of the Mikš family, Brno-Medlánky
2002 – villa, Kroměříž
2004 – house of M. Stránský, Staré Město
2004 – apartment house, Kroměříž
2004 – multi-purpose dwelling on Náměstí Míru, Zlín, with Karel Havliš
2004 – house of Mrs. Válková, Mladcová u Zlína
2004 – house of the Barbořík family, Luhačovice
2004 – house in Míkovice
2004 – view of Brdo, Chřiby
2004 – monument for the Jabůrkov family in the Lesní cemetery, Zlín, with Radim Hanke
2005 – view of the peak Velký Lopeník, Lopeník
2005 – house in Kostelany nad Moravou
2006 – multi-purpose dwelling in Uherské Hradiště
2006 – house v Míkovice II
2006 – family house in Poříčí nad Sázavou
2007 – atrium house in Zlín-Štípa
2007 – family house "X" in Březůvky
2008 – shopping gallery "Golden Apple" Zlín
2008 – family house in Lelekovice
2009 – family house in Kroměříž
2009 – family house in Klatovy
2009 – reconstruction of family house in Lysá nad Labem
2010 – villa, Pustiměř
2011 – family house in Brno-Medlánky
2011 – family house in Lipůvka
2011 – office building Monet+ in Zlín-Štípa
2012 – conversion diesel power-station for living, Lysice
2013 – Hotel Háj, Nová Lhota
2013 – view tower Kosíř u Prostějova
2016 – office building Rapos, Holešov

== Exhibitions ==
- Contemporary Wooden House in the Czech Republic (Současný český dřevěný dům) Selections from 1998–2003
- Gallery of Architecture Brno, 5 November – 12 December 2003
- Gallery of Jaroslav Fragner, 18 December 2003 – 1 February 2004
- KILL YOUR IDOL (Zabij svého Fuchse) – Psychoanalysis of Contemporary Architecture of the City of Brno – 4AM Brno 2011
- Czech and Slovak pavillon at the 13th International Architecture Exhibition of la Biennale di Venezia 2012 Kunstverein Leipzig 2013

== Awards ==
- 1998 – Honourable mention of Grand Prix OA in the category of new building for municipal offices, Šarovy u Zlína
- 2003 – Grand Prix OA in the category of interior design for the interior of the villa in Kroměříž on Barbořina
- 2004 – Archiweb prize
- 2005 – Honourable mention of the Grand Prix OA in the category of Landscape and garden architecture for Observatory on the top of Brdo hill in Chřiby
- 2005 – Nomination of "Club for old Prague " prize for New building in a historical context, for Multi-purposal building in main square of city Zlín (shopping gallery "Golden Apple")
- 2008 – 2nd prize in competition for statue of Edison in Brno (with Marius Kotrba)
- 2008 – 3rd prize in competition "New home" for Family house in Lelekovice
- 2008 – Nomination of "Club for old Prague " prize for New building in a historical context, for Multi-purposal building in Uherské Hradiště
- 2009 – Nomination of "Club for old Prague " prize for New building in a historical context, for Shopping gallery "Golden Apple" in Zlín

== Gallery ==
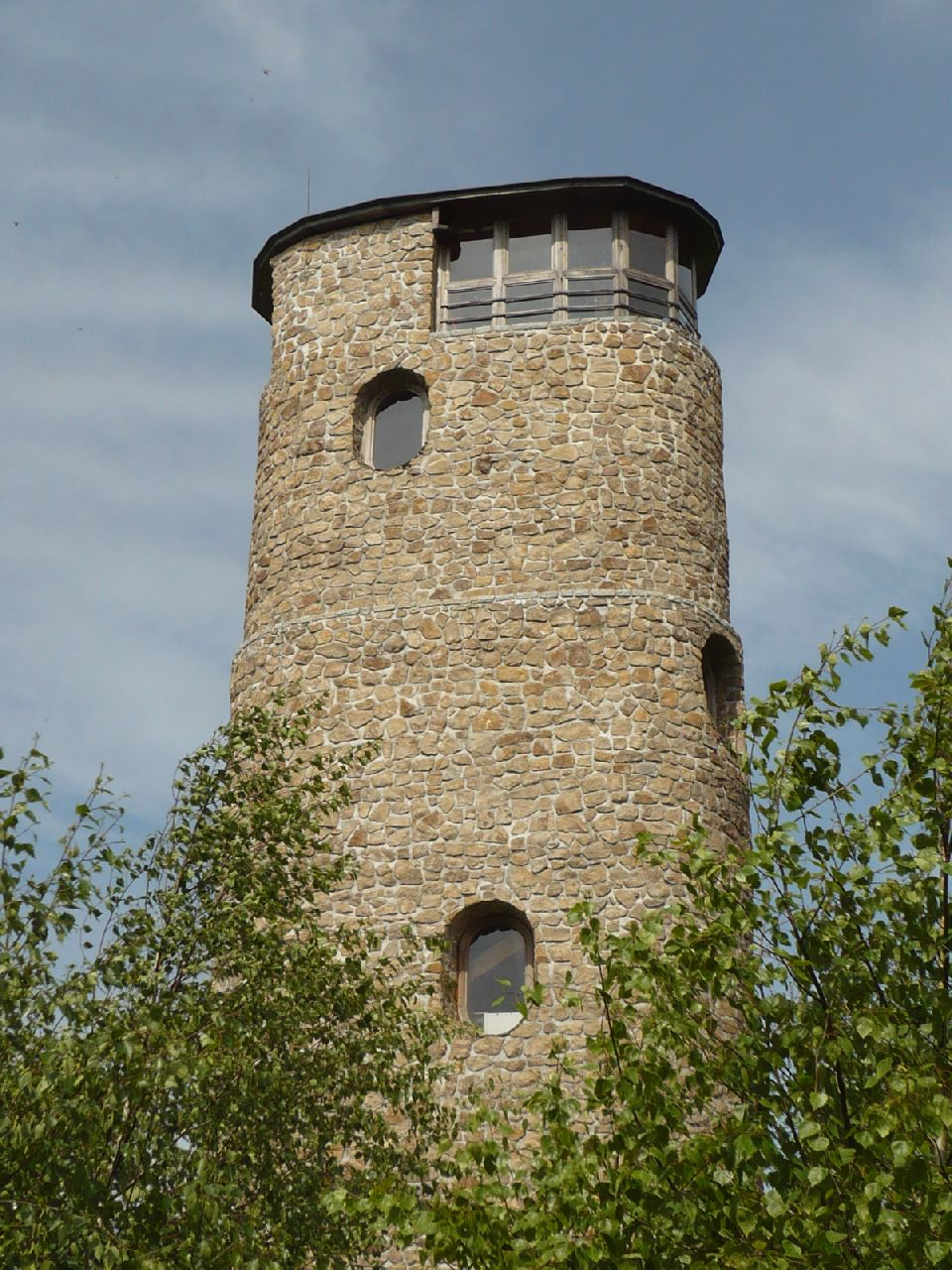
View of Brdo, Chřiby

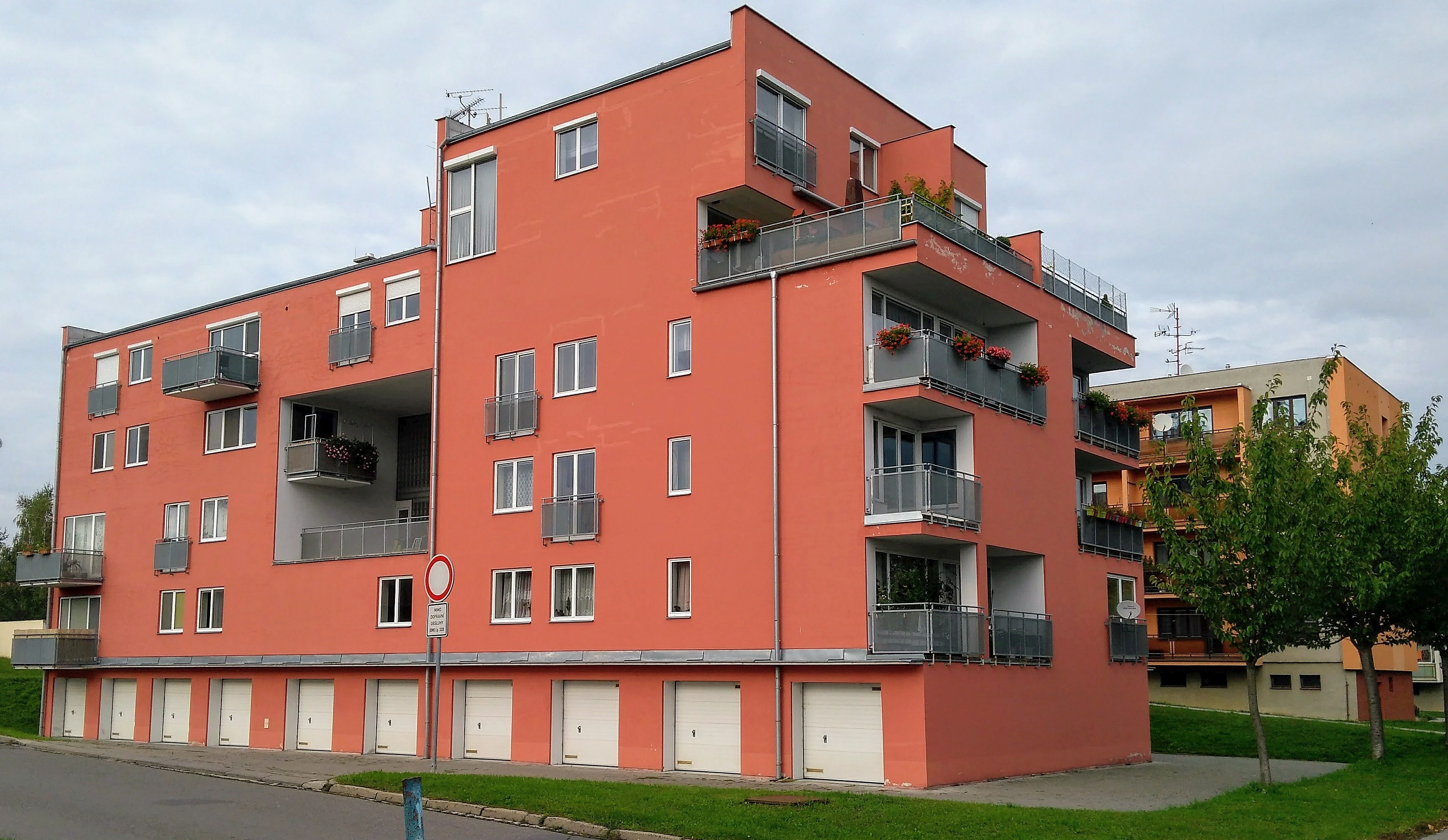
Apartment house, Kroměříž

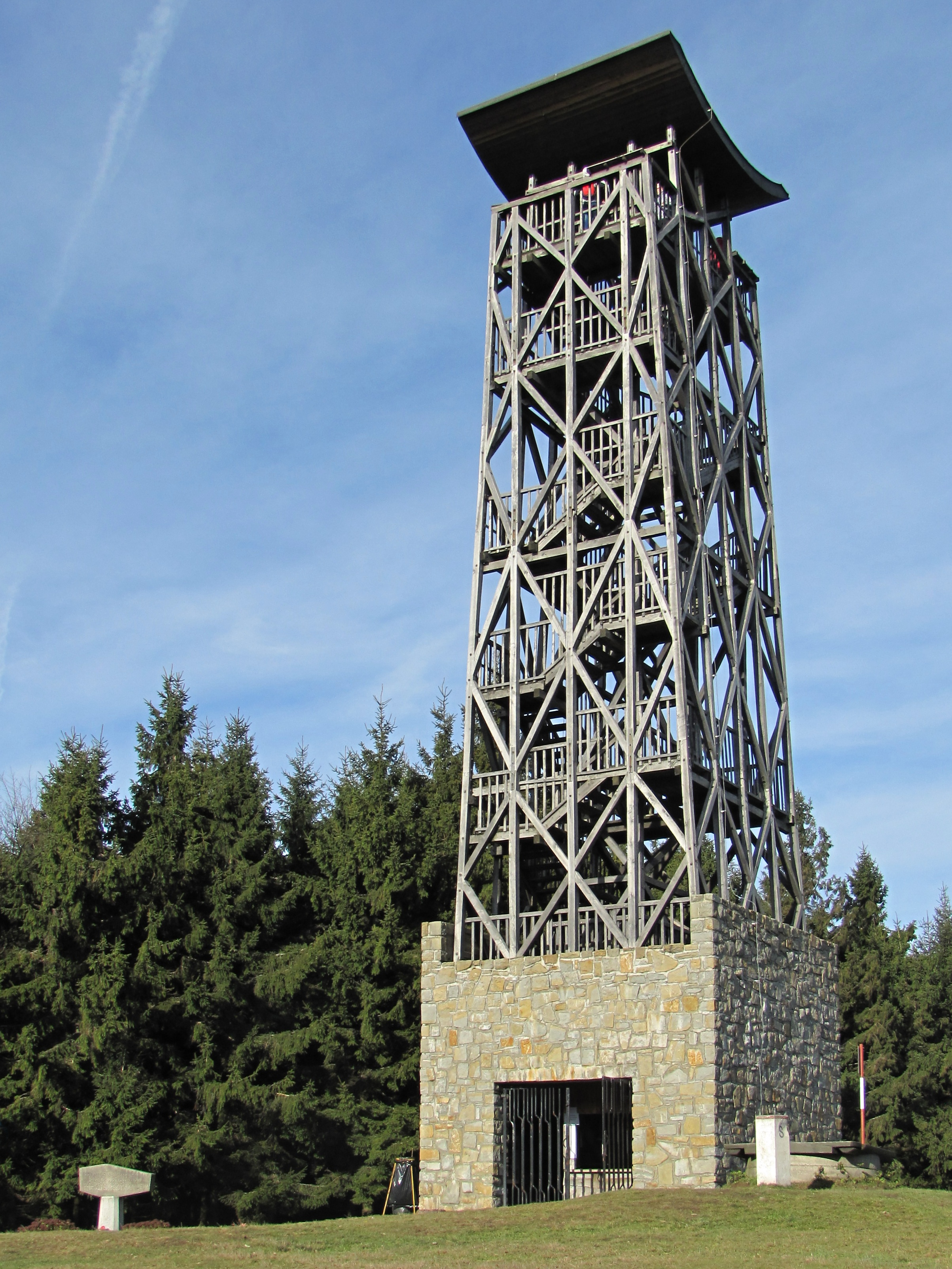
View of the peak Velký Lopeník, Lopeník

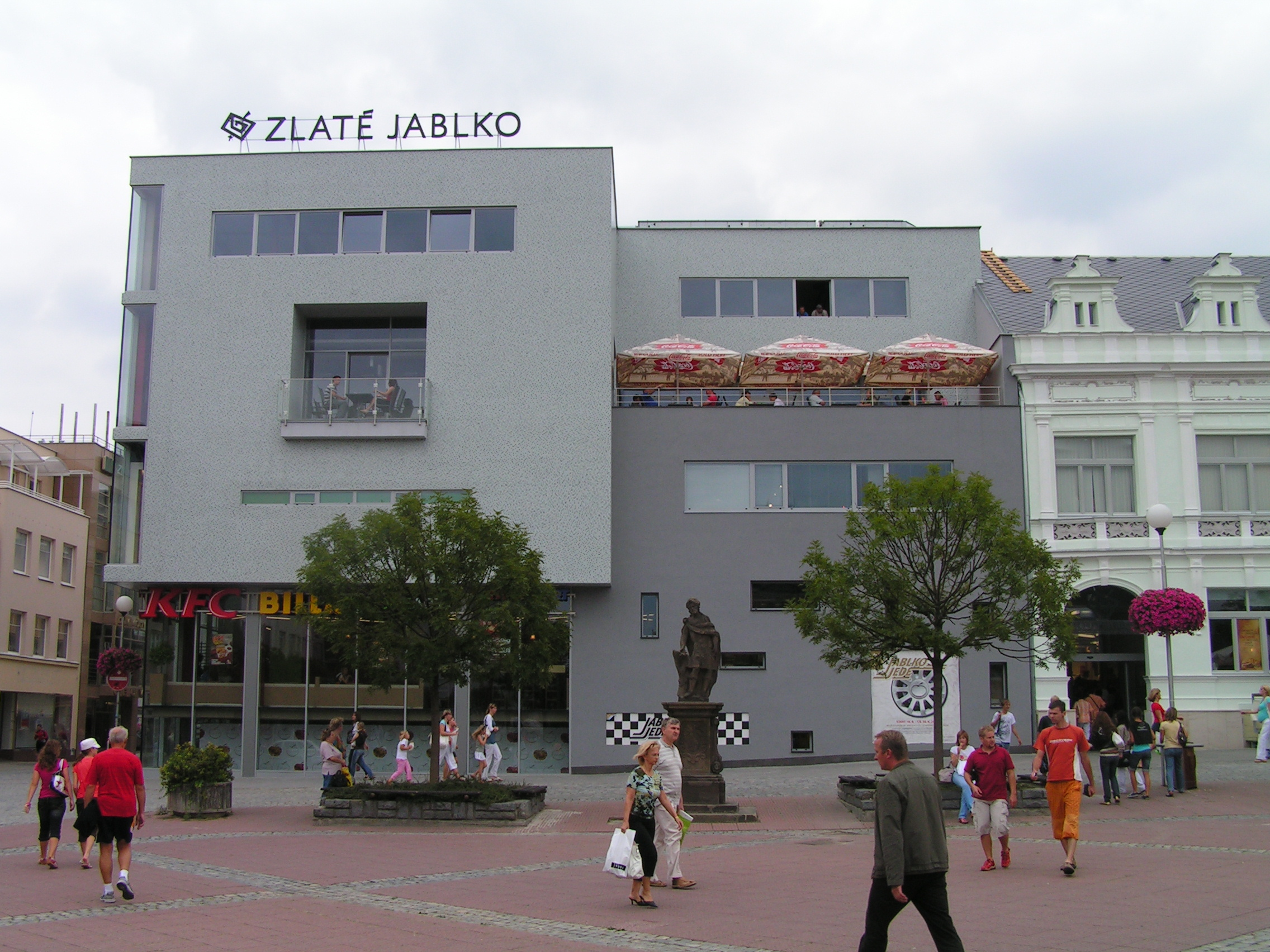
Shopping gallery "Golden Apple" Zlín

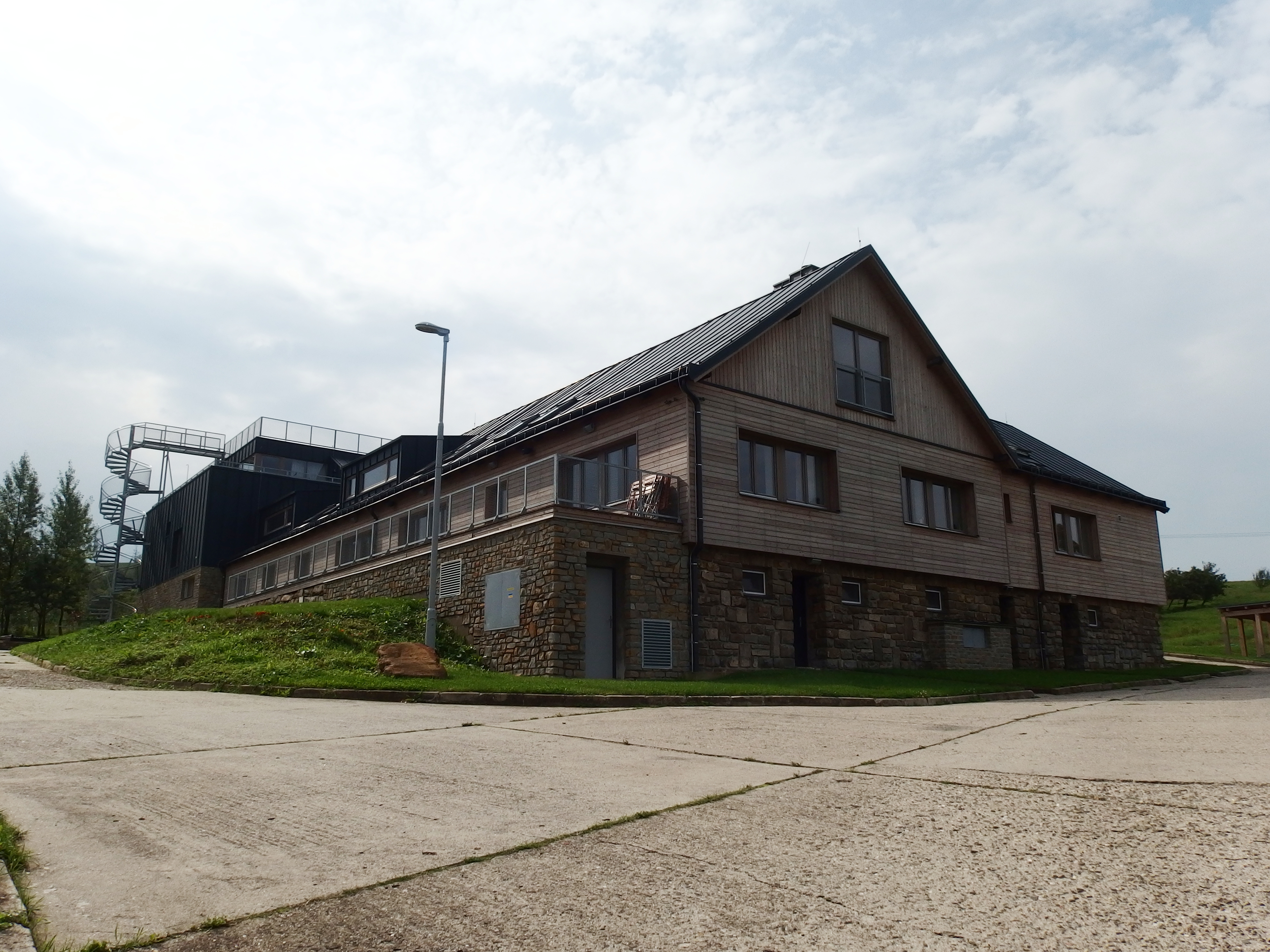
Hotel Háj, Nová Lhota

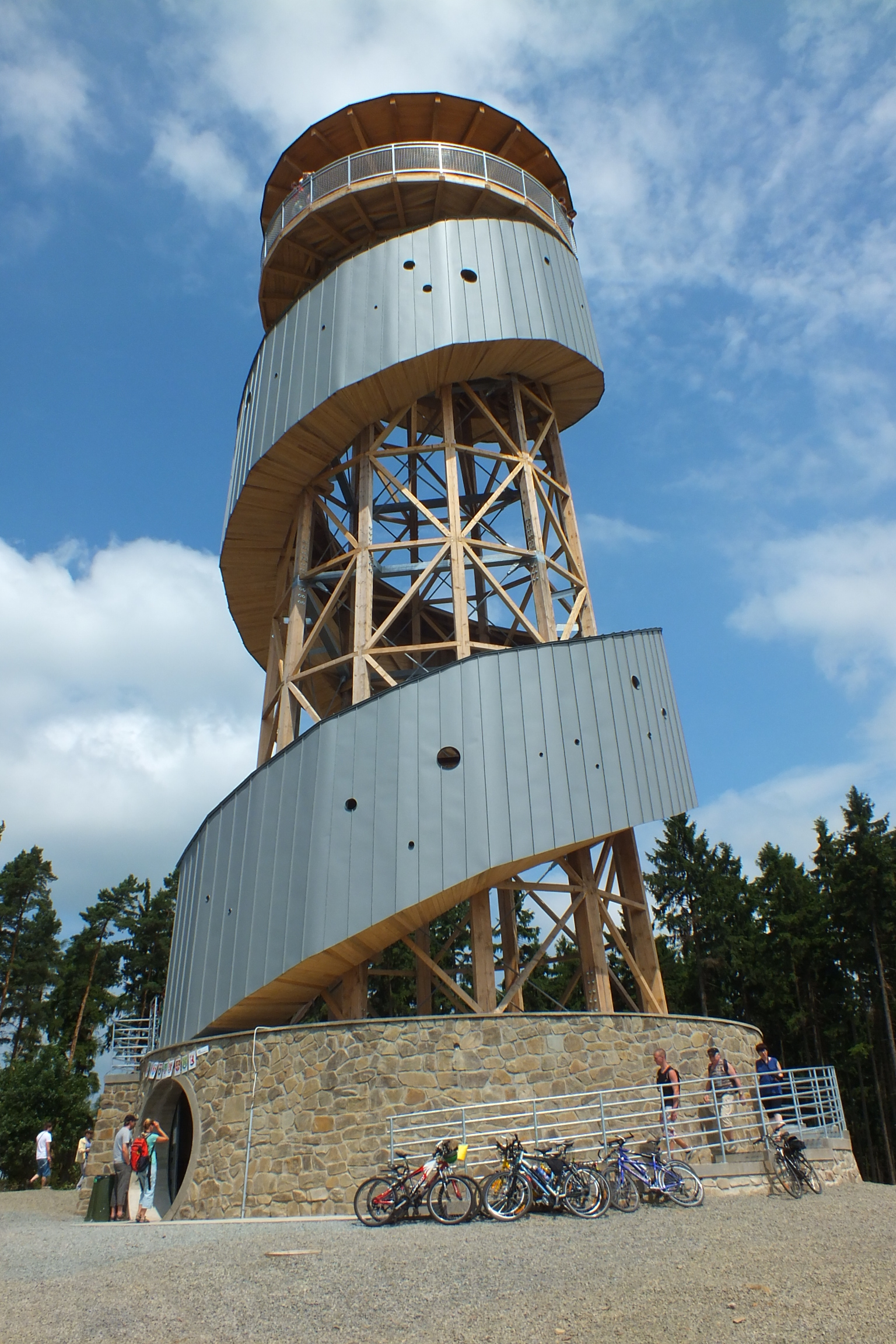
Observation tower Kosíř u Prostějova

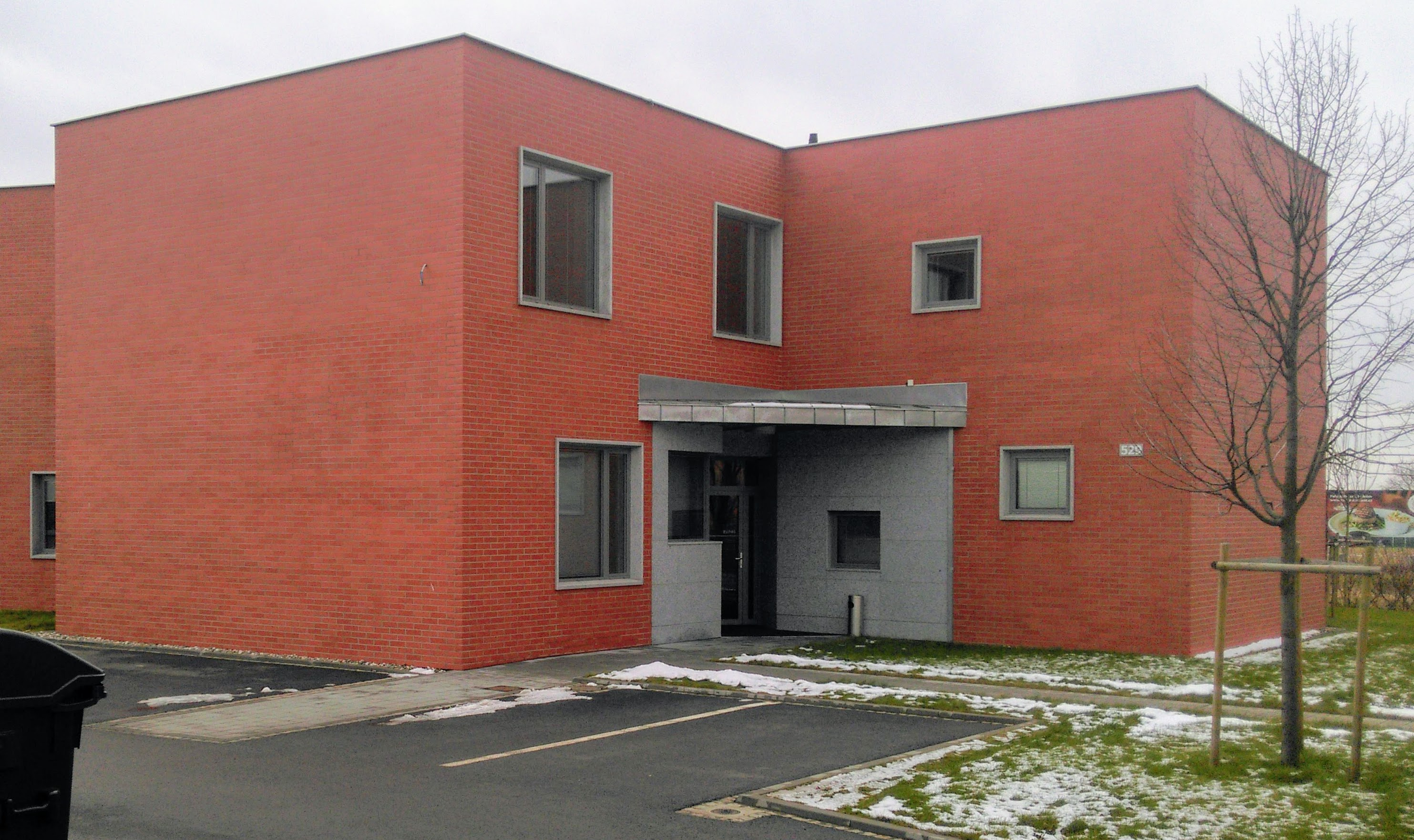
Office building Rapos, Holešov

== Sources ==
- "Svatopluk Sládeček". Archiweb.cz. 29 December 1969.
- Collection European architecture, Michelle Galindo, Braun-publishing, 2009, pp. 356–360
- Collectif-arc en réve centre d´architecture, ed. Francine Fort, 2008 pp. 123–126
- Housig I., Archiworld, 2011 pp. 44–48
