= Markéta Veselá =

Czech architect (born 1970)

Markéta Veselá (born 28 December 1970) is a Czech architect.

== Education ==
Veselá was born in Brno, and attended Slovanske Namesti Grammar School in Brno in 1989. She studied architecture at Brno University of Technology, where she graduated in 1994. In 1995, she began postgraduate study at INEA in Rouen.

== Career ==
Between 1996 and 2000, Veselá worked in Brno's architectural studios. She founded the Maura Architectural Practice (Ateliér Maura) in February 2001.

=== Projects ===
- The gate of time (Bránu času), Moravská Třebová (2013)
- Villa Sadova, Brno (2011)
- Garden Restaurant, Brno (2011)
- Kaskada Restaurant, Liberec (2010)
- Family house, Beroun (2010)
- Multi-use building, Kozi Street, Brno (2009)
- Building reconstruction, Slezska, Brno (2009)
- Reconstruction of a secondary school, Tr. Kpt. Jarose, Brno (2008)
- Development plan, Konopiste Resort (2008)
- Renovation of a family house, Troubsko (2007)
- Family house, Brno-Lesna (2007)
- Regeneration of concrete apartment blocks, Brno-Bystrc (2006)
- Apartment renovation, Ovenecka, Prague (2006)
- Family house, Modrice (2006)
- Minach Chocolate Cafe, Brno (2005)
- Reconstruction of HDO Headquarters, Zabreh (2004)
- Villa Nad Udolim, Prague-Hodkovicky (2003)
- Reconstruction of an apartment building, Skrivanova, Brno (2002)

=== Exhibitions ===
KILL YOUR IDOL (Zabij svého Fuchse) - Psychoanalysis of Contemporary Architecture of the City of Brno - 4AM Brno 2011, Czech and Slovak pavillon at the 13. International Architecture Exhibition of la Biennale di Venezia 2012, Kunstverein Leipzig 2013, Dvacet po dvaceti, 2009 - Psí bouda jako symbol objektu, karikatura velké architektury, Galerie Jaroslava Fragnera Praha 2009, Die Botschaft der Tschechischen Republik Berlin 2010

== Bibliography ==
- Maura 2001–2011, Brno 2012, ISBN 978-80-260-3052-2
