= Jacob Lienhard =

Jacob Lienhard was an officer in the United States Marine Corps during World War I. He would be awarded the Navy Cross and the Distinguished Service Cross.

His Navy Cross citation reads:

The President of the United States of America takes pleasure in presenting the Navy Cross to Second Lieutenant Jacob Lienhard (MCSN: 0-557), United States Marine Corps, for extraordinary heroism while serving with the 17th Company, 5th Regiment (Marines), 2d Division, A.E.F. in action near St. Etienne, France, 4 October 1918. Second Lieutenant Lienhard led his men in an attack on a strongly held enemy position through heavy machine-gun and shell fire, and although severely wounded continued to lead and encourage his men.

His Distinguished Service Cross citation reads:

The President of the United States of America, authorized by Act of Congress, July 9, 1918, takes pleasure in presenting the Distinguished Service Cross to Second Lieutenant Jacob Lienhard (MCSN: 0-557), United States Marine Corps, for extraordinary heroism while serving with the Seventeenth Company, Fifth Regiment (Marines), 2d Division, A.E.F., in action near St. Etienne, France, 4 October 1918. Second Lieutenant Lienhard led his men in an attack on a strongly held enemy position through heavy machine-gun and shell fire, and although severely wounded continued to lead and encourage his men.

Lienhard was born in Plymouth, Wisconsin.
