= Jiri Lev =

Australian architect and urbanist (born 1979)

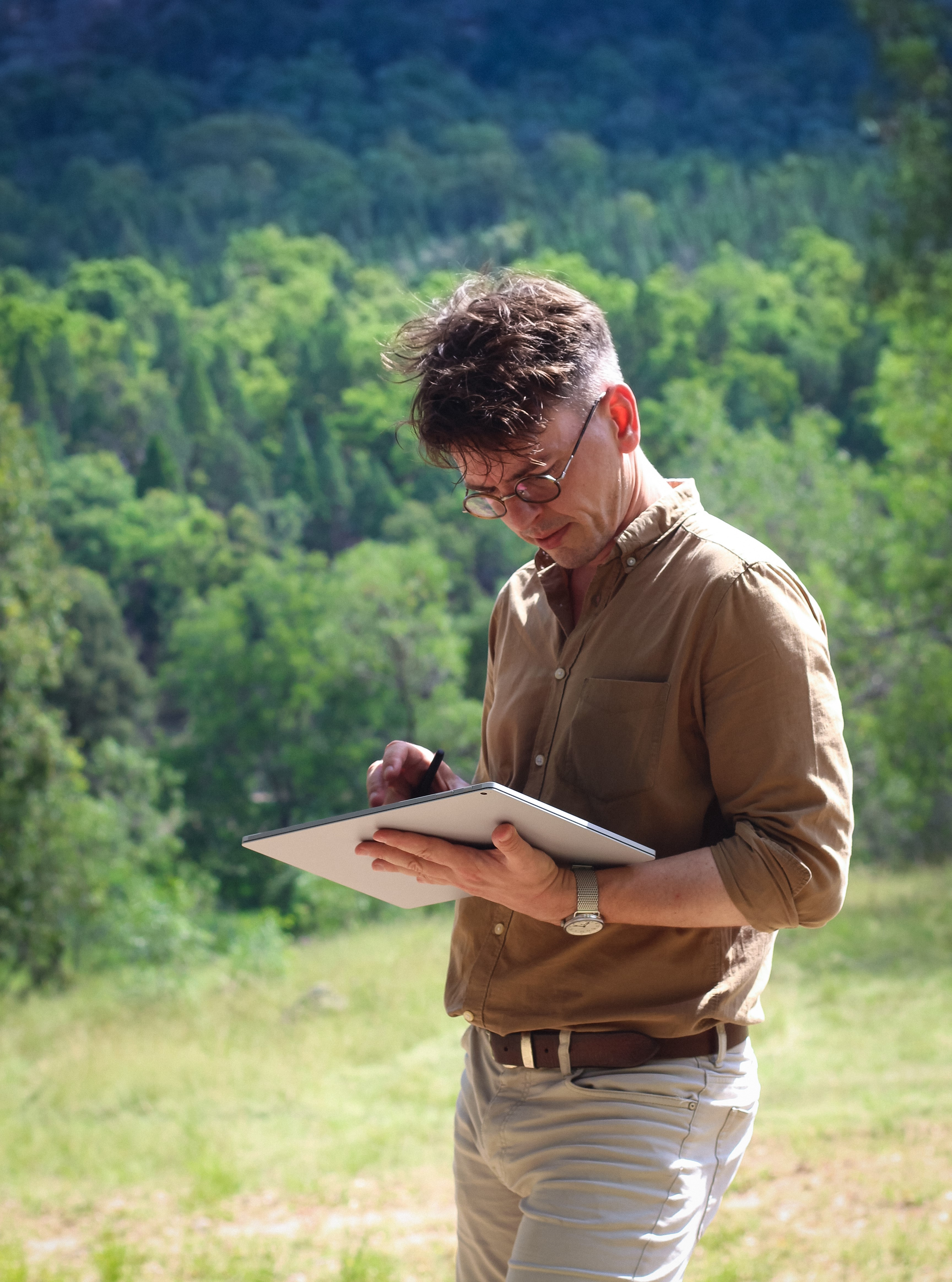
- Born: 1979 (age 46–47); Brno, Czechoslovakia
- Citizenship: Australia, Czech Republic
- Education: University of Newcastle (Australia)
- Occupation: Architect
- Years active: 1998 – present
- Style: Contextual, Contemporary traditional, New classical
- Parent: Jiří Löw

Jiri Lev (born 1979, /ˈjɪrɪ ˈlɛv/, Czech: Jiří Lev or germanised Löw) is an Australian architect and urbanist, recognised for his residential, sacred and public architecture, and disaster recovery and humanitarian work.

== Career ==
Lev first established his multidisciplinary design practice in Prague in 1998, before relocating to Sydney, Australia in 2005.

Lev’s works works are known for their highly varied, regionally specific, contextual, often traditional, sometimes classical style, inspired in the vernacular, prolific use of natural, raw, locally sourced construction materials, and avoidance of synthetic treatments, paints and plastics. His open-source residential designs have been widely replicated across Australia and North America.

Lev is recognised for his philanthropic and community-focused initiatives. Following the 2019-20 Australian bushfires, he established Architects Assist, a joint initiative of six hundred architectural firms providing assistance to victims (later passed under the Australian Institute of Architects). In 2021 he founded Architekti Pro Bono in Czechia to aid victims of the South Moravia tornado.

Lev's firm, Atelier Jiri Lev is known not to enter awards nor publicise their client’s private residential projects. Works include Holtermann Museum (2015), Courtyard House (2018), Tasmanian House (2021), Tasmanian Homestead (2023) and Tasmanian House 3 (2025). The firm operates across Australian states and internationally.

== Personal life ==
Lev was born in 1979 in Brno, Czechoslovakia (today Czech Republic). He relocated to Sydney, Australia in 2005. He studied architecture at the University of Newcastle, where he founded a grassroots architecture festival.

Lev stood as an independent candidate in the 2025 Tasmanian state election, proposing housing scheme for disadvantaged people and advocating for reforms to planning regulations, greater transparency, stronger environmental protection, and minimum aesthetic standard for new buildings, reflecting local character and tradition.

== See also ==
- Contextual architecture
- List of Australian architects
- New classical architecture
- New urbanism
- Sustainable architecture
- Traditional architecture
- Vernacular architecture
