= Rudolf Wels =

Czech architect

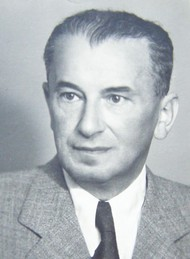

Rudolf Wels (28 April 1882, in Osek near Rokycany, western Bohemia – 8 March 1944, in KZ Auschwitz) was a Czech architect active in western Bohemia and in Prague.

Rudolf Wels worked in the Karlovy Vary Region and also Prague. He designed glass for the Moser company and a designed film sets (including for the film Workers, Let's Go). Wels was one of the most outstanding inter-war architects in Czechoslovakia. He studied at the Vienna Academy with Friedrich Ohmann. In Vienna he also attended courses given by Adolf Loos, who was to have a crucial influence on his future creative activity. From the early 1920s, Rudolf Wels worked in Karlovy Vary, where, in the period 1921-1922 he worked for the celebrated glass manufacturer Moser, refurbishing existing buildings and designing new ones. He also designed several sets of glasses for that company, as well as artistically-decorated vases, which received awards at the International Exposition of Modern Industrial and Decorative Arts held in Paris in 1925.

In 1923 he designed the Miners’ Building at Falkenau (now Sokolov), where, a year later he was responsible for the design of two schools and other buildings. Among his many projects in Karlovy Vary, the most successful are the Health Insurance Building (now Polyclinic) on Náměstí Milady Horáková, the Bellevue spa hotel and the (now demolished) 6th Spa Pavilion. In the 1930s Rudolf Wels moved to Prague, where he opened a design studio jointly with the architect Guido Lagus. In 1934 Wels and Lagus were responsible for the art direction of four feature films, and in the subsequent years they designed a number of luxury apartment buildings.

In 1939, Rudolf Wels transcribed the memoirs of his father Šimon (né Wedeles) and added an afterword. The manuscript was published fifty years later as “U Bernátů”(At the Bernards’).

In 1942, Rudolf Wels was interned with his wife Ida and son Martin at Terezín, from where they were sent to the Auschwitz concentration camp the following year. All three died when 7000 remaining inmates of the “family camp” were killed in the gas chambers in July 1944.
