= Kauffman–White classification =

Microbiological classification system for genus Salmonella

The Kauffmann–White classification or Kauffmann and White classification scheme is a system that classifies the genus Salmonella into serotypes, based on surface antigens. It is named after Philip Bruce White and Fritz Kauffmann. First the "O" antigen type is determined based on oligosaccharides associated with lipopolysaccharide. Then the "H" antigen is determined based on flagellar proteins (H is short for the German Hauch meaning "breath" or "mist"; O stands for German ohne meaning "without"). Since Salmonella typically exhibit phase variation between two motile phenotypes, different "H" antigens may be expressed. Salmonella that can express only one "H" antigen phase consequently have motile and non-motile phenotypes and are termed monophasic, whilst isolates that lack any "H" antigen expression are termed non-motile. Pathogenic strains of Salmonella Typhi, Salmonella Paratyphi C, and Salmonella Dublin carry the capsular "Vi" antigen (Vi for virulence), which is a special subtype of the capsule's K antigen (from the German word Kapsel meaning capsule). In 2007, the WHO Collaborating Centre for Reference and Research on Salmonella (WHOCC-Salm), which maintains and updates the classification scheme, and is based in France, proposed that it be renamed the White–Kauffmann–Le Minor scheme, to honor the work of Léon Le Minor, who described most of serovars known at the time.

== Kauffmann–White classification for Salmonella ==
Salmonella (species) serotype (O antigen) : (H1 antigen) : (H2 antigen)

Examples

Salmonella enterica serotype Typhimurium 1,4,5,12:i:1,2

monophasic variant of Salmonella Typhimurium 1,4,5,12:i:-

"O"-group	Serovar	"O" antigens	Phase 1 "H" antigens	Phase 2 "H" antigens
A	S.Paratyphi A	1,2,12	a	no phase 2 antigen
	S. Paratyphi A var. Durazzo	2,12	a	no phase 2 antigen
B	S. Paratyphi B	1,4,5,12	b	1,2
	S. Paratyphi B var. Odense	1,4,12	b	1,2
	S. Java	1,4,5,12	b	(1,2)
	S. Limete	1,4,12,27	b	1,5
	S. Typhimurium	1,4,5,12	i	1,2
	S. Typhimurium var. Copenhagen	1,4,12	i	1,2
	S. Agama	4,12	i	1,6
	S. Abortus-equi	4,12	no phase 1 antigen	e,n,x
	S. Abortus-ovis	4,12	c	1,6
	S. Agona	4,12	f,g,s	no phase 2 antigen
	S. Brandenburg	4,12	l,v	e,n,z_{15}
	S. Bredeney	1,4,12,27	l,v	1,7
	S. Derby	1,4,5,12	f,g	no phase 2 antigen
	S. Heidelberg	1,4,5,12	r	1,2
	S. Saintpaul	1,4,5,12	e,h	1,2
	S. Salinatis	4,12	d,e,h	d,e,n,z_{15}
	S. Stanley	4,5,12	d	1,2
C_{1}	S. Paratyphi C	6,7,Vi	c	1,5
	S. Choleraesuis	6,7	c	1,5
	S. Choleraesuis var. Kunzendorf	6,7	(c)	1,5
	S. Decatur	6,7	c	1,5
	S. Typhisuis	6,7	c	1,5
	S. Bareilly	6,7	y	1,5
	S. Infantis	6,7	r	1,5
	S. Menston	6,7	g,s,t	no phase 2 antigen
	S. Montevideo	6,7	g,m,s	no phase 2 antigen
	S. Oranienburg	6,7	m,t	no phase 2 antigen
	S. Thompson	6,7	k	1,5
C_{2}	S. Bovismorbificans	6,8	r	1,5
	S. Newport	6,8	e,h	1,2
D	S. Typhi	9,12,Vi	d	no phase 2 antigen
	S. Ndolo	9,12	d	1,5
	S. Dublin	1,9,12,Vi	g,p	no phase 2 antigen
	S. Enteritidis	1,9,12	g,m	no phase 2 antigen
	S. Gallinarum	1,9,12	no phase 1 antigen	no phase 2 antigen
	S. Pullorum	(1),9,12	no phase 1 antigen	no phase 2 antigen
	S. Panama	1,9,12	l,v	1,5
	S. Miami	1,9,12	a	1,5
	S. Sendai	1,9,12	a	1,5
E_{1}	S. Anatum	3,10	e,h	1,6
	S. Give	3,10	l,v	1,7
	S. London	3,10	l,v	1,6
	S. Meleagridis	3,10	e,h	l,w
E_{2}	S. Cambridge	3,15	e,h	l,w
	S. Newington	3,15	e,h	1,6
E_{3}	S. Minneapolis	(3),(15),34	e,h	1,6
E_{4}	S. Senftenberg	1,3,19	g,s,t	no phase 2 antigen
	S. Simsbury	1,3,19	no phase 1 antigen	z_{27}
F	S. Aberdeen	11	i	1,2
G	S. Cubana	1,13,23	z_{29}	no phase 2 antigen
	S. Poona	13,22	z	1,6
H	S. Heves	6,14,24	d	1,5
	S. Onderstepoort	1,6,14,25	e,h	1,5
I	S. Brazil	16	a	1,5
	S. Hvittingfoss	16	b	e,n,x
Others	S. Kirkee	17	b	1,2
	S. Adelaide	35	f,g	no phase 2 antigen
	S. Locarno	57	z_{29}	z_{42}

- Antigens in brackets are those that are rarely expressed in that serovar.

== Representative stock of antisera ==
The cost of maintaining a full set of antisera precludes all but reference laboratories from performing a complete serological identification of salmonella isolates. Most laboratories stock only a limited range of antisera, and the choice of stock sera is largely determined by the nature of the specimens to be processed.

A common set of working antisera is shown below:

O-antisera	H-antisera
polyvalent-O, groups A-G	polyvalent-H, specific and non-specific
2-O, group A	polyvalent-H, non-specific factors 1,2,5,6,7
4-O, group B	a-H (S. Paratyphi A)
6, 7-O, group C1	b-H (S. Paratyphi B)
8-O, group C2	c-H (S. Paratyphi C)
9-O, group D	d-H (S. Typhi)
3, 10, 15, 19-O group E	e,h-H (S. Newport)
11-O, group F	f,g-H (S. Derby)
13, 22-O, group G	g,m-H (S. Enteritidis)
	i-H (S. Typhimurium)
	k-H (S. Thompson)
	l,v-H (S. London)
	m,t-H (S. Oranienburg)
	r-H (S. Bovismorbificans)

Laboratories that are likely to investigate typhoid also carry antiserum raised against the Vi antigen.

A set of "Rapid Diagnostic Sera" is also held and is used for determination of common specific H-antigens except i-H. After obtaining a positive agglutination with the polyvalent-H specific and non-specific antiserum, the three RDS antisera are used to identify the H antigen present. Depending on the pattern of positive and negative reactions with the RDS antisera, the specific H antigen may be identified:

antigen	RDS1	RDS2	RDS3
b	agglutination	agglutination	no agglutination
d	agglutination	no agglutination	agglutination
E	agglutination	agglutination	agglutination
G	no agglutination	no agglutination	agglutination
k	no agglutination	agglutination	agglutination
L	no agglutination	agglutination	no agglutination
r	agglutination	no agglutination	no agglutination

E = polyvalent for eh, enx, etc.
G = polyvalent for gm, gp, etc.
L = polyvalent for lv, lw, etc.

== Nonserological correlates ==
Instead of antibody-based serotyping, modern laborotories increasingly use DNA-based methods such as pulsed field gel electrophoresis, multiple-loci VNTR analysis, multilocus sequence typing, and multiplex-PCR. These "molecular serotyping" systems actually perform genotyping of the genes that determine surface antigens. They largely agree with the Kauffman-White results, allowing the system to continue to be used.

== Connection of O and H symbols to the work of Weil and Felix ==
This use of the O and H symbols is based on the historic observations of Edmund Weil (1879–1922) and Arthur Felix (1887–1956) of a thin surface film produced by agar-grown flagellated Proteus strains, a film that resembled the mist produced by breath on a glass. Flagellated (swarming, motile) variants were therefore designated H forms (German Hauch, for film, literally breath or mist); nonflagellated (nonswarming, nonmotile) variants growing as isolated colonies and lacking the surface film were designated as O forms (German ohne Hauch, without film [i.e., without surface film of mist droplets]).
