= Horní Kamenice =

- Municipality
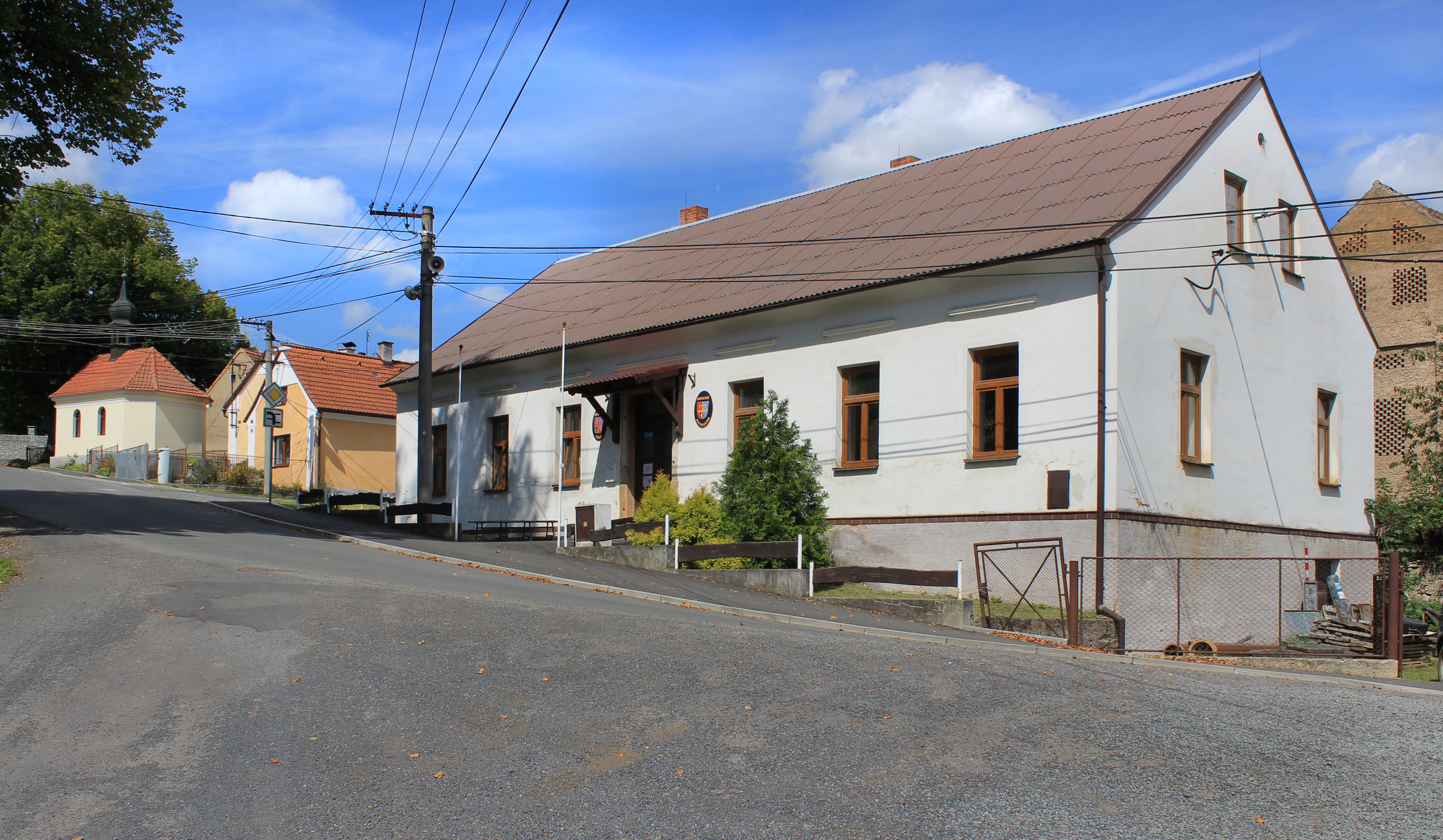
- Municipal office and chapel (left)

- Flag Coat of arms

- Location in the Czech Republic
- Coordinates: 49°34′11″N 13°6′4″E
- Country: Czech Republic
- Region: Plzeň
- District: Plzeň-South
- First mentioned: 1115

Area
  - Total: 3.85 km^{2} (1.49 sq mi)
- Elevation: 377 m (1,237 ft)

Population (2026-01-01)
  - Total: 251
  - Density: 65.2/km^{2} (169/sq mi)
- Time zone: UTC+1 (CET)
  - Summer (DST): UTC+2 (CEST)
- Postal code: 345 62
- Website: www.hornikamenice.cz

Horní Kamenice is a municipality and village in Plzeň-South District in the Plzeň Region of the Czech Republic. It has about 300 inhabitants.

== Geography ==
Horní Kamenice is located about 26 kilometres (16 mi) southwest of Plzeň. It lies on the border between the Švihov Uplands and Plasy Uplands. The highest point is at 464 m (1,522 ft) above sea level. The stream Srbický potok flows through the municipality.

== History ==
The first written mention of Horní Kamenice is in the foundation deed of the monastery in Kladruby from 1115. From the mid-14th century to the end of the 15th century, it was owned by the Bohuchval of Hrádek family as a part of their Lacembok estate. From the 16th century, Horní Kamenice was a property of the Knights of Šlovice. In 1677, the village was bought by the Trauttmansdorff family and annexed to the Horšovský Týn estate.

From 1 January 2021, Horní Kamenice is no longer a part of Domažlice District and belongs to Plzeň-South District.

== Demographics ==
Historical population

Year	Pop.	±%
1869	401	—
1880	357	−11.0%
1890	377	+5.6%
1900	441	+17.0%
1910	430	−2.5%

Year	Pop.	±%
1921	423	−1.6%
1930	443	+4.7%
1950	313	−29.3%
1961	352	+12.5%
1970	323	−8.2%

Year	Pop.	±%
1980	276	−14.6%
1991	223	−19.2%
2001	203	−9.0%
2011	227	+11.8%
2021	265	+16.7%

Source: Censuses

== Transport ==
The railway line Plzeň–Domažlice briefly crosses the municipal territory, but there is no train station. There are no major roads passing through the municipality.

== Sights ==
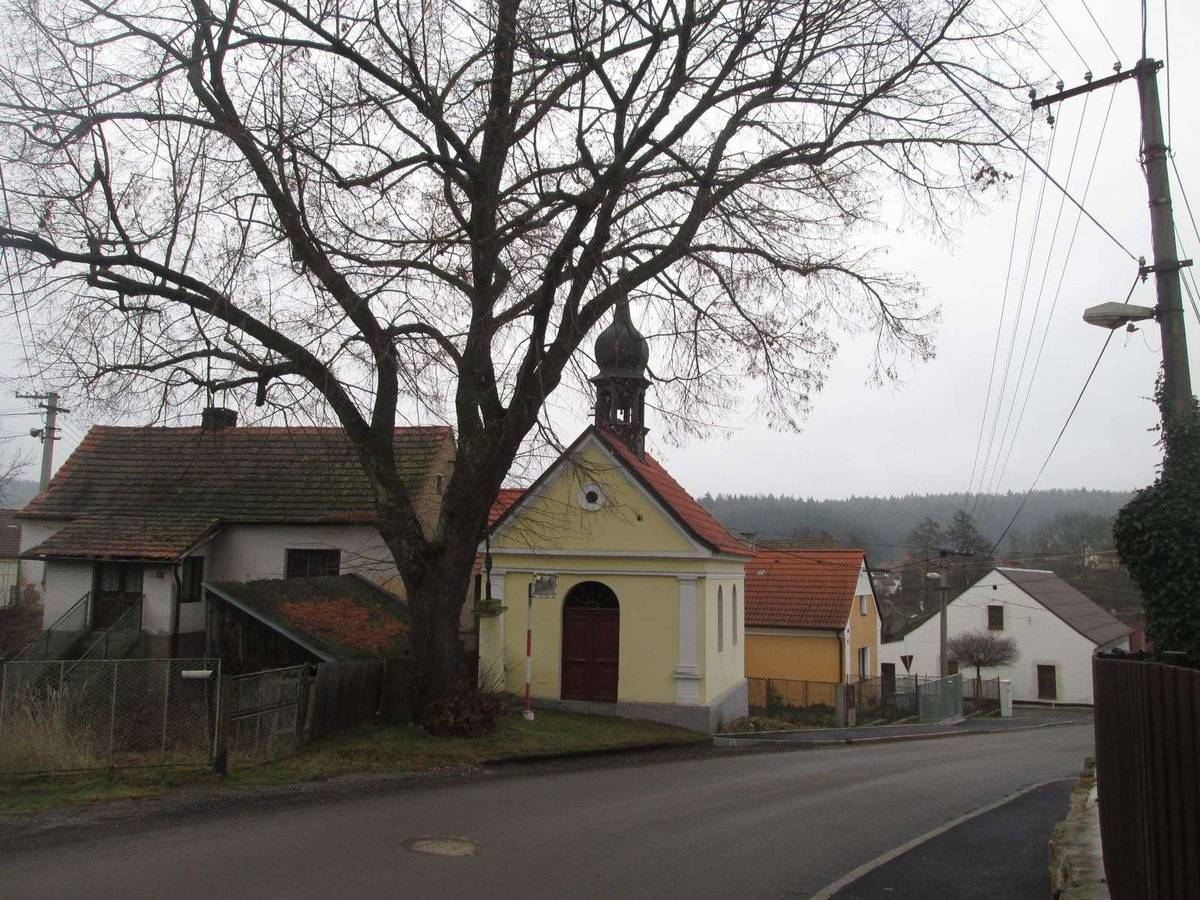
Chapel of Saint John of Nepomuk

The only protected cultural monument in the municipality is the ruin of the Lacembok Castle, from which only part of the fortifications survived. The castle was probably founded in the second half of the 13th century and abandoned in the second half of the 15th century.

A cultural landmark in the centre of Horní Kamenice is the Chapel of Saint John of Nepomuk.
