= Stráž (Tachov District) =

- Market town
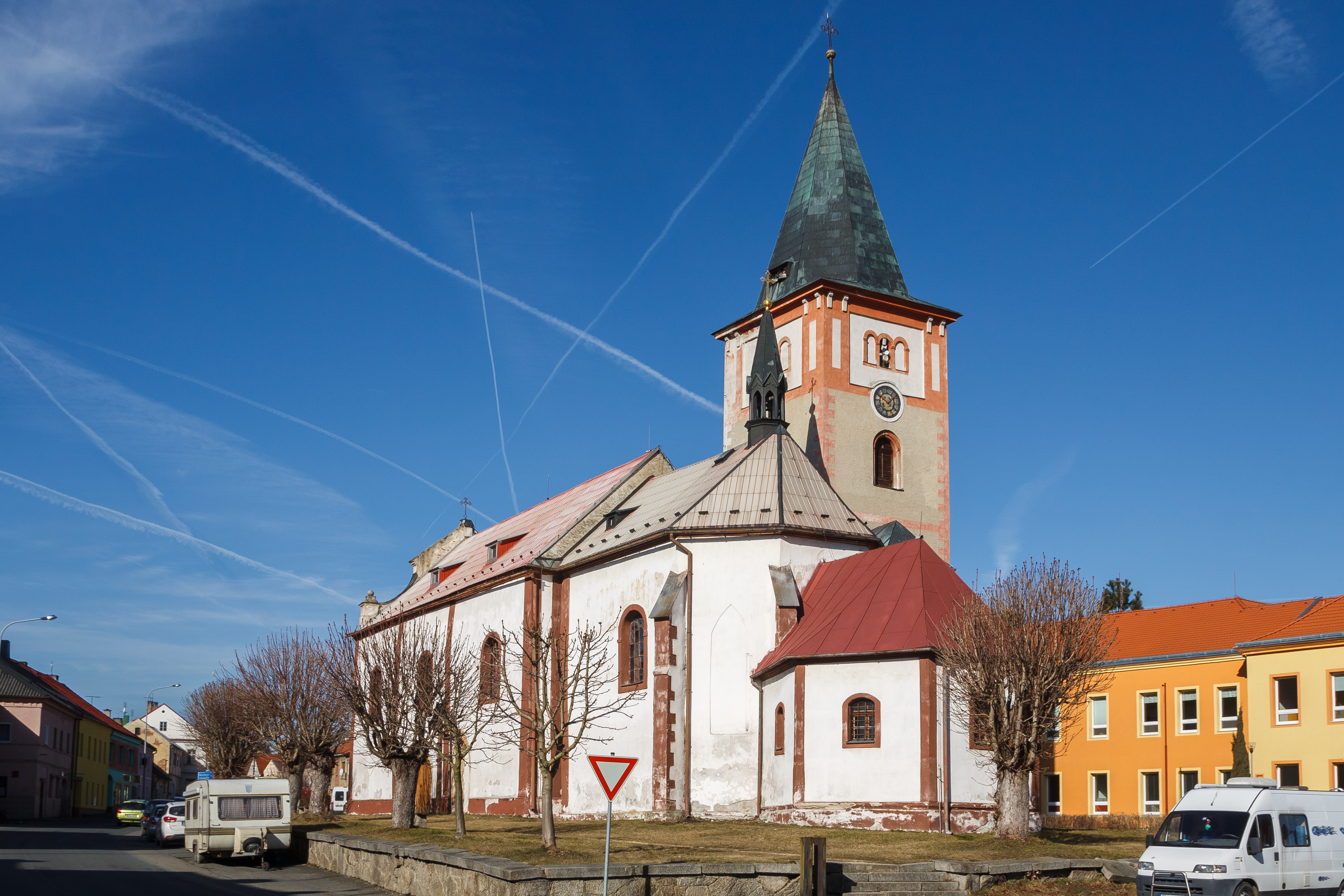
- Church of Saint Wenceslaus at the town square

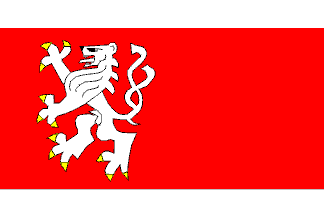
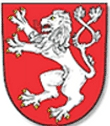
- Flag Coat of arms

- Location in the Czech Republic
- Coordinates: 49°40′9″N 12°45′52″E
- Country: Czech Republic
- Region: Plzeň
- District: Tachov
- First mentioned: 1331

Area
  - Total: 53.97 km^{2} (20.84 sq mi)
- Elevation: 448 m (1,470 ft)

Population (2026-01-01)
  - Total: 1,369
  - Density: 25.37/km^{2} (65.70/sq mi)
- Time zone: UTC+1 (CET)
  - Summer (DST): UTC+2 (CEST)
- Postal codes: 348 02, 348 06
- Website: www.obecstraz.cz

Stráž (Czech pronunciation: [ˈstraːʃ]; German: Neustadtl) is a market town in Tachov District in the Plzeň Region of the Czech Republic. It has about 1,400 inhabitants.

== Administrative division ==
Stráž consists of 11 municipal parts (in brackets population according to the 2021 census):

- Stráž (791)
- Bernartice (90)
- Bonětice (41)
- Bonětičky (29)
- Borek (37)
- Dehetná (37)
- Jadruž (25)
- Olešná (42)
- Souměř (49)
- Strachovice (57)
- Valcha (5)

== Etymology ==
The name Stráž means 'guard' in Czech. This name was often given to places that were used for guarding and from which it was possible to see well into the distance, or to places along rivers that served to keep watch so that no one passed without paying the toll.

== Geography ==
Stráž is located about 17 kilometres (11 mi) southeast of Tachov and 43 km (27 mi) west of Plzeň. It lies in the Podčeskoleská Hills. The highest point is the hill Homole at 579 m (1,900 ft) above sea level. The upper course of the Úhlavka River flows through the market town. The territory of Stráž is rich in fishponds.

== History ==
The first written mention of Stráž is from 1331, when it became a market town. Existence of a Jewish community is also documented in 1331. After the Hussite Wars, the area began to be settled by Germans. From the mid-15th century, Stráž was a part of the Přimda estate.

== Demographics ==
Historical population

Year	Pop.	±%
1869	3,172	—
1880	3,170	−0.1%
1890	3,087	−2.6%
1900	3,009	−2.5%
1910	2,944	−2.2%

Year	Pop.	±%
1921	2,800	−4.9%
1930	2,683	−4.2%
1950	1,380	−48.6%
1961	1,305	−5.4%
1970	1,145	−12.3%

Year	Pop.	±%
1980	1,019	−11.0%
1991	958	−6.0%
2001	1,070	+11.7%
2011	1,072	+0.2%
2021	1,203	+12.2%

Source: Censuses

== Transport ==
Stráž is located on the railway line Tachov–Domažlice.

== Sights ==
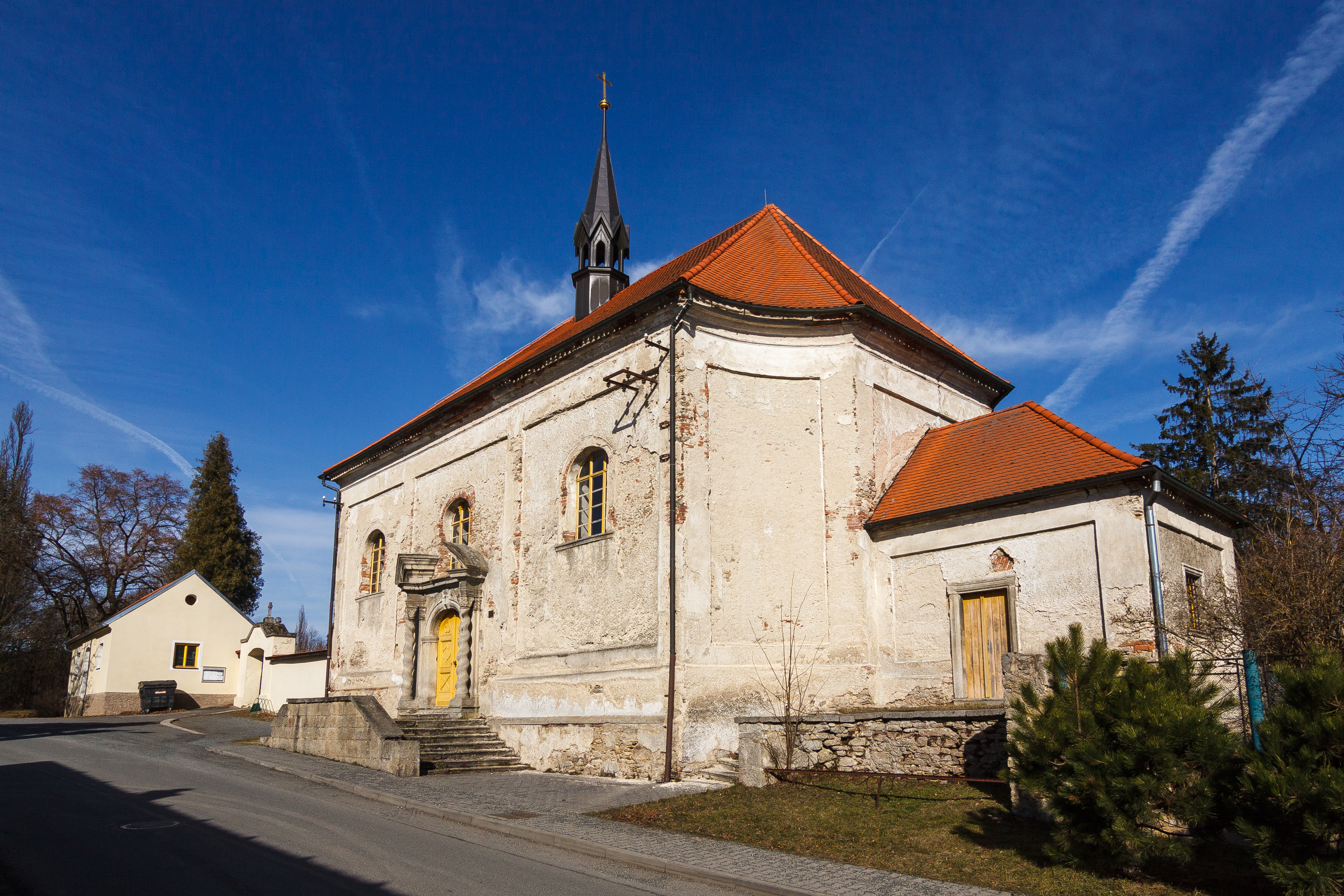
Church of Saint John the Baptist

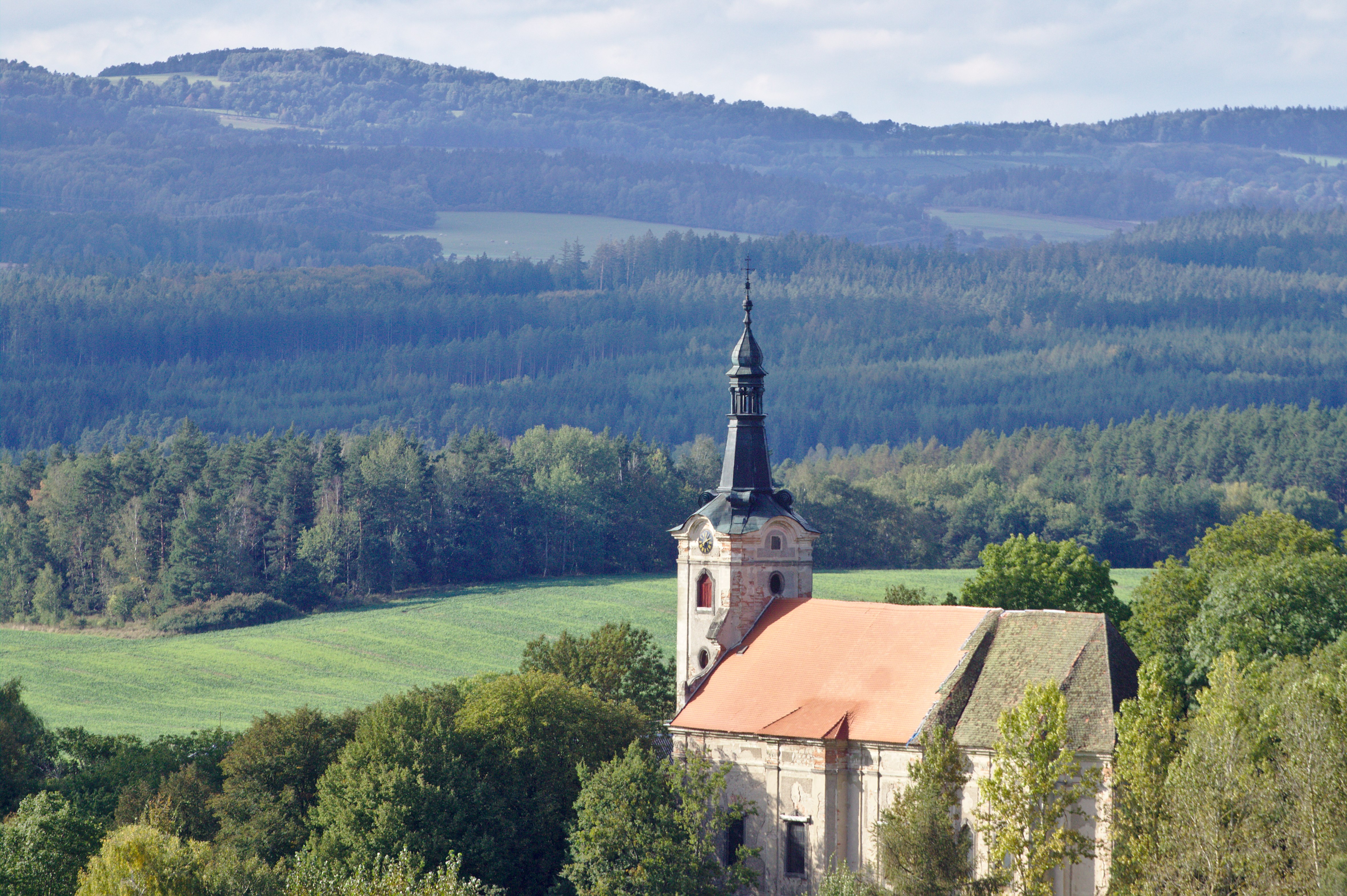
Church of Saints Peter and Paul

The main landmark of Stráž is the Church of Saint Wenceslaus. It was originally a Romanesque church from the turn of the 12th and 13th centuries, rebuilt in all periods: in the Gothic in the second half of the 14th century; in the Renaissance in 1609, when the tower was added; in the Baroque in two stages – 1720–1722 and 1740s; and in 1878, when reconstruction was carried out after the fire in 1876.

The Church of Saint John the Baptist is a cemetery church located on the western edge of the market town. It was built in the Baroque church in 1734.

The Church of Saints Peter and Paul is located in Bernartice. It is a large Baroque church, built in 1734–1739 on the site of an old Gothic church.

The Jewish cemetery in Stráž is one of the oldest cemeteries of this kind in Bohemia. The first written mention of the cemetery is from 1450, but it is probably older. The preserved tombstones are from the 17–19th centuries.

== Notable people ==
- Anton Gag (1859–1908), painter
- Edmund Weil (1879–1922), German bacteriologist
