= Anton Gag =

Bohemian-American painter (1859–1908)

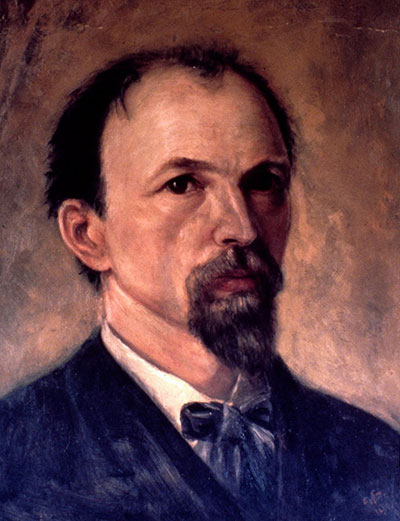
- Anton Gag self portrait
- Born: Anton Gag; 12 June 1859; Walk, Kingdom of Bohemia, Austrian Empire
- Died: 22 May 1908 (aged 48); New Ulm, Minnesota, United States
- Resting place: New Ulm City Cemetery; 44.3333282°N 94.4866714°W
- Known for: Painting, photography
- Spouses: Ida Berndt (m. 1886; died 1887) Elizabeth Biebl (m. 1892)

Anton Gag (12 June 1859 – 22 May 1908) was a Sudeten-American painter and studio photographer known for his portraits, still lifes, landscapes, and murals. Immigrating to the United States at the age of 14 with his family in 1873, he later settled in New Ulm, Minnesota, where he spent most of his working life.

Together with other local painters, Gag decorated altars and walls of several churches in the area. He and a partner also produced a large panorama with eleven panels on the Dakota War of 1862. One of his paintings of the Battle of New Ulm hung in the Minnesota Capitol building until its removal in 2016.

== Biography ==
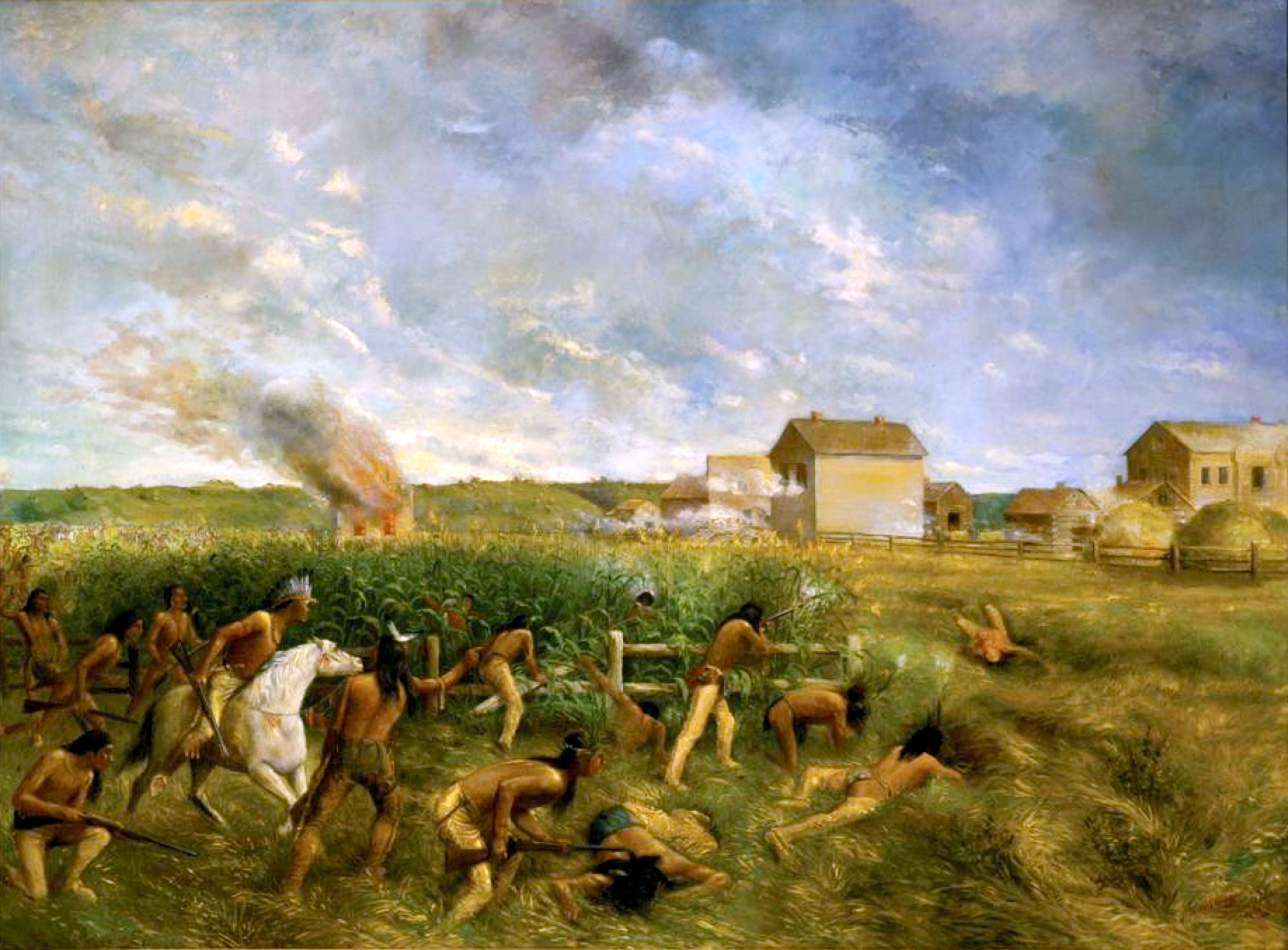
1904 painting Attack on New Ulm

Anton Gag (also spelled "Gaag") was born in 1859 as the last of five children in his family in Walk (now Valcha), a hamlet of 15 homes, which is part of today's Stráž in western Bohemia, Austrian Empire (now Czech Republic). The family were Sudeten German Catholics. His father George Gaag was a wood craftsman and his mother Theresia Hamperl-Heller (b. 1821) was the legitimized daughter of a sheepherder.

His family immigrated to the United States in 1873, when Gaag was 14; his older sister had earlier emigrated there. They first settled in St. Paul, Minnesota, a city on the Mississippi River. (He changed the spelling of his surname to "Gag" after some time in the US.) By the time he was growing up there, the city had grown to 30,000 people. For a time he lived with his older brother Joseph, a tailor. In the 1875–76 city directory, Gag identified as an "artist". By 1878–79 he was working as a "cigar maker".

In 1880 Gag moved to New Ulm, an immigrant community along the Cottonwood River. It had many residents who were ethnic German and Bohemian, and most of his family had settled here. He was befriended by August Schell, founder of Schell's Brewery. The older man acted as a mentor and patron, commissioning Gag to paint murals in a guest house.

That year Schell also arranged for Gag to attend art school in Chicago, likely the Chicago Academy of Fine Arts, and to study for a time in Milwaukee. After his return to New Ulm, Gag earned most of his income through his photography studio, especially portraits and the popular cartes de visite. He pursued working as an artist, although it did not earn him much money.

In 1886, Gag married Ida Berndt. She died the next year of complications from child birth. Their infant daughter died a month later.

In 1892 the young widower Gag married Elizabeth (known as Lissi) Biebl of Harrisburg, Pennsylvania, whose family had migrated to Minnesota. They were well-educated immigrants from Kscheutz (Ksire), Bohemia. Lissi had worked as his assistant in his photography studio. They raised a family of seven children in the German tradition. He was known to allow his children much freedom and was non-conforming in his personal behavior. His life and art were formed by the liberal humanist values of the German-Bohemian culture.

In 1894, Gag built a Queen-Anne style family home that he decorated with murals. He reserved a room in it for his photographic studio. He also painted works on canvas and board. With other local artists Alexander Schwendihger and Christian Heller, he decorated New Ulm's Cathedral of the Holy Trinity, built in 1883 in the German Baroque style. They created an altar and painted ceiling murals that were similar to traditional church ornament in Bohemia. The trio also worked in 1898 for St. Patrick's Catholic Church in Zumbro Falls, Minnesota. Heller and Gag renovated the Congregational Church in New Ulm that year.

Together with Heller, Gag collaborated on a large panorama of the Dakota War of 1862, telling about the second battle of New Ulm. These works, often devoted to historical events, were highly popular. This panorama had 11 panels, each 7 x 10 feet, and painted on a long roll of fabric. It was favorably received. The firm of Heller and Gag also performed interior decoration of homes and clubs, painted drop curtains for theatres, and at times employed up to 30 workmen for their many projects.

Gag painted an estimated 60 works: his 1904 painting Battle of New Ulm (1904) depicted part of the Dakota War. It was displayed in the Minnesota State Capitol until its removal in 2016 due to controversy surrounding its portrayal of Sioux people.

Gag died at age 48 in New Ulm, Minnesota in 1908 from tuberculosis. He is buried in the New Ulm City Cemetery. His daughter, Wanda Gág (who added the accent to her name), became a celebrated author and artist in her own right. She continued to live in the family house after her parents died.

== Legacy ==
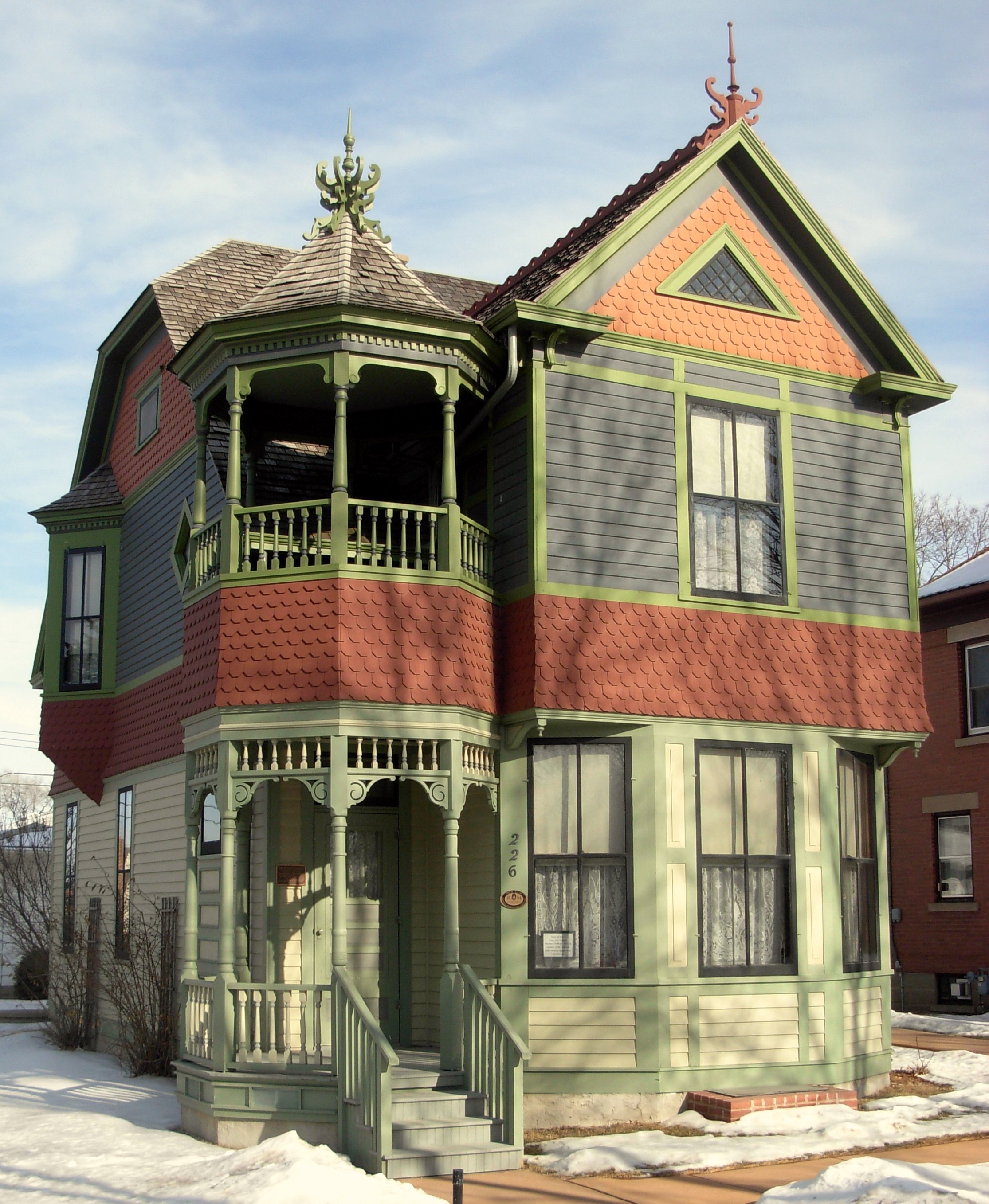
Gag Family Home

The house where the Gag family lived, at 226 N. Washington, New Ulm, is now known as the Wanda Gág House. It is listed on the National Register of Historic Places and is open for public tours. The house has been preserved and is operated as a museum to tell the story of this family, showing examples of their art and way of life during their residence. The exterior of the house has been restored to the original colors of the period when the Gag family lived there, including Wanda after her parents died. The interior is also being restored to that time period. The process has uncovered detailed, decorative hand-painting done by Gag and Wanda on walls throughout the house.
