= Arthur Felix =

Polish microbiologist and serologist

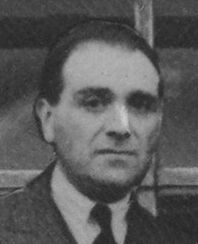
- Born: 3 April 1887; Andrychów
- Died: 17 January 1956 (aged 68)
- Known for: Weil–Felix test
- Awards: Fellow of the Royal Society
- Scientific career
- Fields: Microbiology
- Institutions: Lister Institute

Arthur Felix, FRS (3 April 1887 in Andrychów – 17 January 1956 in England) was a Polish-born microbiologist and serologist.

== Education and early life ==
Arthur Felix was the son of Theodor Felix, who had an interest in printed textiles and who encouraged his son to study textile dye chemistry. Felix studied chemistry in Vienna and was awarded a Doctor of Science degree. After working in his father's textile printing factory, he returned to Vienna to study microbiology. Arthus Felix was Jewish; he became interested in Zionism during his student days in Vienna and later developed into an authority on Palestine.

== Career ==
In 1915, Arthur Felix and Edmund Weil were Austrian medical officers working in a field laboratory in Sokal and discovered a diagnostic test for patients with typhus that makes use of an antibody cross reaction to a strain of Proteus bacillus that had been isolated from urine. They developed the Weil–Felix test for diagnosis of typhus and other rickettsial diseases. The use of the O and H symbols in the Kauffman–White classification originates from the research by Edmund Weil and Arthur Felix.

In 1934, Felix identified the Vi antigen in patients with typhoid fever. The discovery of Vi antigen was done in collaboration with Miss R. Margaret Pitt. Pitt co-authored many publications with Felix throughout her career, although not much is known about her as misogyny kept her from the proper recognition she deserved as a scientist.

Felix and Pitt isolated the Salmonella Typhi strain Ty2, which is still in use in laboratory research today. Ty2 was the basis for the Ty21a vaccine strain, a live attenuated strain used to protect patients from typhoid fever today. Ty2 was isolated from a patient in Kherson in 1918. Ty2 was investigated due to its ability to avoid agglutination in rabbit serum, which Felix and Pitt later determined was due to the production of Vi capsule which inhibits binding of O antigen. He and Pitt also then went on to discover antigens present in Paratyphi A and B. He also co-authored a comprehensive review of what was known about typhoid fever and diagnosis with another female scientist, Miss M. Rhodes.

Much of the foundational knowledge about typhoid fever pathology, diagnosis of typhoid fever, and the foundational work that lead to the two typhoid vaccines in use today are contributed by Dr. Felix and his colleagues.

After World War I, Felix emigrated to Britain and worked at the Lister Institute.

Felix researched in Bielsko, Vienna, Prague, and London. Between 1927 and 1945, he worked in Jerusalem for the Hadassah Medical Organization.

== Awards and honours ==
In 1943 he was elected a Fellow of the Royal Society.
