= Weil–Felix test =

Agglutination test for the diagnosis of rickettsial infections

- Purpose: diagnosis of rickettsial infections

The Weil–Felix test is an agglutination test for the diagnosis of rickettsial infections. It was first described in 1916. By virtue of its long history and of its simplicity, it has been one of the most widely employed tests for rickettsia on a global scale, despite being superseded in many settings by more sensitive and specific diagnostic tests. The Weil–Felix antibody was recently found to target the rickettsial lipopolysaccharide O-antigen.

== History and basis for test ==
The basis of the test is the presence of antigenic cross-reactivity between Rickettsia spp. and certain serotypes of non-motile Proteus spp., a phenomenon first published by Edmund Weil and Arthur Felix in 1916. Weil-Felix is a nonspecific agglutination test which detects anti-rickettsial antibodies in patient’s serum. Weil-Felix test is based on cross-reactions which occur between antibodies produced in acute rickettsial infections with antigens of OX (OX 19, OX 2, and OXK) strains of Proteus species. Dilution of patient’s serum are tested against suspensions of the different Proteus strains. William James Wilson (1879-1954) had noticed a similar cross reaction of anti-rickettsial antobodies with other enteric bacteria.

Typhus group rickettsiae (Rickettsia prowazekii, R. typhi) react with P. vulgaris OX19, and scrub typhus (Orientia tsutsugamushi) reacts with P. mirabilis OXK. The spotted fever group rickettsiae (R. rickettsii, R. africae, R. japonica, etc.) react with P. vulgaris OX2 and OX19, to varying degrees, depending on the species.

The Weil–Felix test suffers from poor sensitivity and specificity, with a recent study showing an overall sensitivity as low as 33% and specificity of 46%. Other studies have had similar findings. As a result, it has largely been supplanted by other methods of serology, including indirect immunofluorescence antibody (IFA) testing, which is the gold standard. However, in resource-limited settings, it still remains an important tool in the diagnosis and identification of public health concerns, such as outbreaks of epidemic typhus.

== Procedure ==
The Weil–Felix test can be done as either a slide or a tube test. The antigens necessary (OX2, OX19, and OXK) can be obtained commercially.

=== Slide method ===
- Place 50–100 μL of patient serum on the slide
- Add a drop of desired antigen (Proteus OX19 or OX2 or OXK)
- Mix the suspension by rotating the slide for 1 minutes
- Visible agglutination indicates the positive test.

=== Tube method ===
Using 0.25% phenol saline as a diluent, a series of tubes containing twofold dilutions of patient serum are made with a final volume of 1 mL. A drop of antigen suspension is added to each tube, and the mixture is incubated at 50–55 °C for 4–6 hours. A positive tube would show visible flocculation or granulation, which is accentuated when the tube is gently agitated. The titer corresponds to the most dilute tube in the series that still shows positivity. Generally, a titer of ≥1:320 is considered diagnostic.
