= Úhlavka =

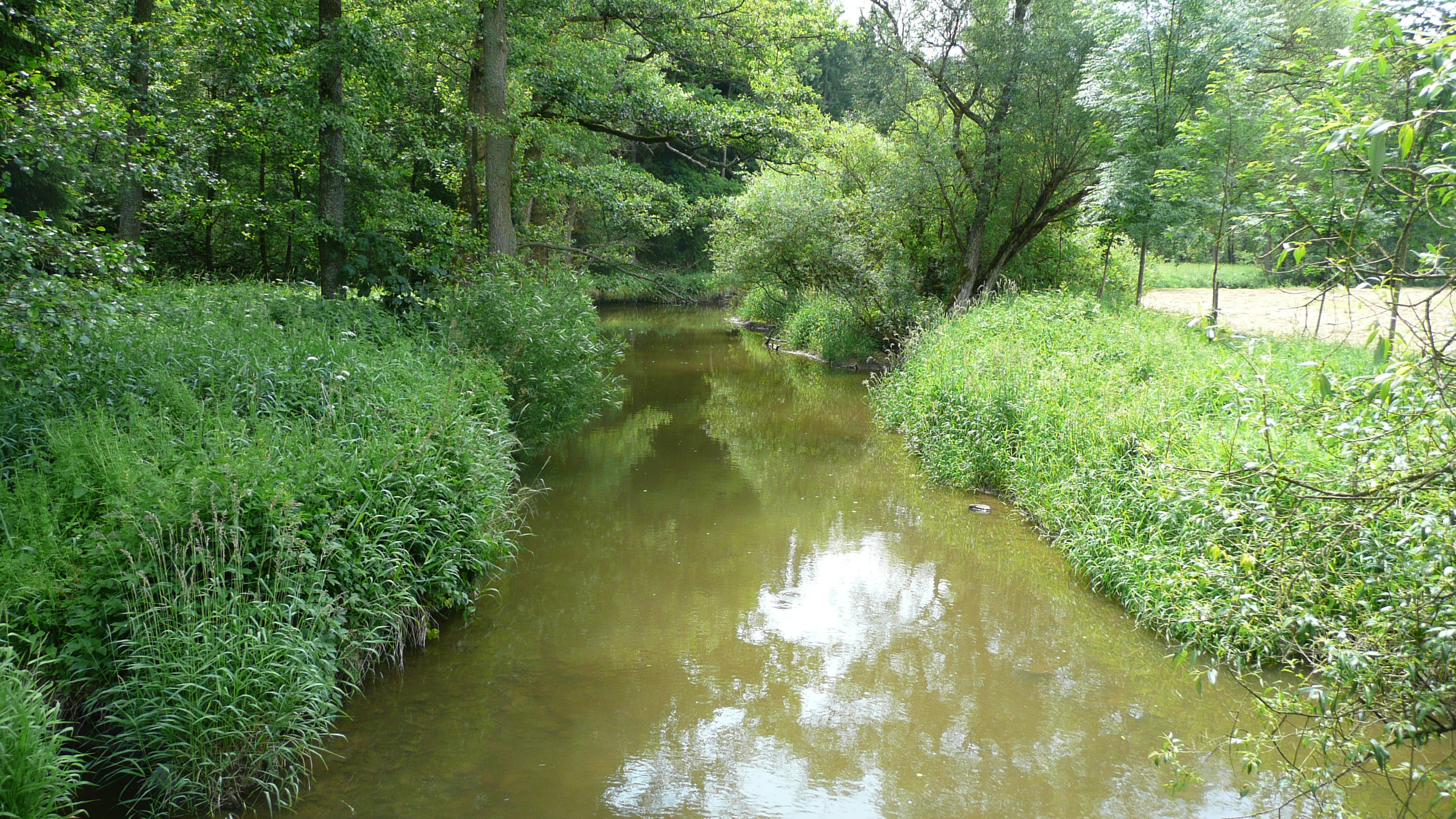
- The Úhlavka in Kladruby

Location
- Country: Czech Republic
- Region: Plzeň

Physical characteristics
- Source
  - location: Přimda, Upper Palatine Forest
  - coordinates: 49°40′30″N 12°41′32″E
  - elevation: 635 m (2,083 ft)
- Mouth
  - location: Mže
  - coordinates: 49°44′24″N 12°59′43″E
  - elevation: 362 m (1,188 ft)
- Length: 41.4 km (25.7 mi)
- Basin size: 296.6 km^{2} (114.5 sq mi)
- Discharge
  - average: 1.20 m^{3}/s (42 cu ft/s) near estuary

Basin features
- Progression: Mže→ Berounka→ Vltava→ Elbe→ North Sea

The Úhlavka is a river in the Czech Republic, a right tributary of the Mže River. It flows through the Plzeň Region. It is 41.4 km (25.7 mi) long.

== Etymology ==
The name is a diminutive form of Úhlava, which is a river in the same region.

== Characteristic ==
The Úhlavka originates in the territory of Přimda in the Upper Palatine Forest at an elevation of 635 m (2,083 ft) and flows to Stříbro, where it enters the Mže River at an elevation of 362 m (1,188 ft). It is 41.4 km (25.7 mi) long. Its drainage basin has an area of 296.6 km^{2} (114.5 sq mi). The average discharge at its mouth is 1.20 m^{3}/s (42 cu ft/s).

The longest tributaries of the Úhlavka are:

Tributary	Length (km)	Side
Výrovský potok	21.7	left
Čankovský potok	14.5	right
Mezholezský potok	7.9	right

== Course ==
The river flows through the municipal territories of Přimda, Bor, Stráž, Staré Sedlo, Prostiboř, Zhoř, Kostelec, Kladruby and Stříbro.

== Bodies of water ==
There are 291 bodies of water in the basin area. The largest of them are the fishponds Mezholezský rybník with an area of 32.2 ha (80 acres), built on the Mezholezský potok, and Dlouhý rybník with an area of 30.6 ha (76 acres), built on the middle course of the Úhlavka. A set of small fishpond is built on the upper course of the river.

== See also ==
- List of rivers of the Czech Republic
