= Kšice =

- Municipality
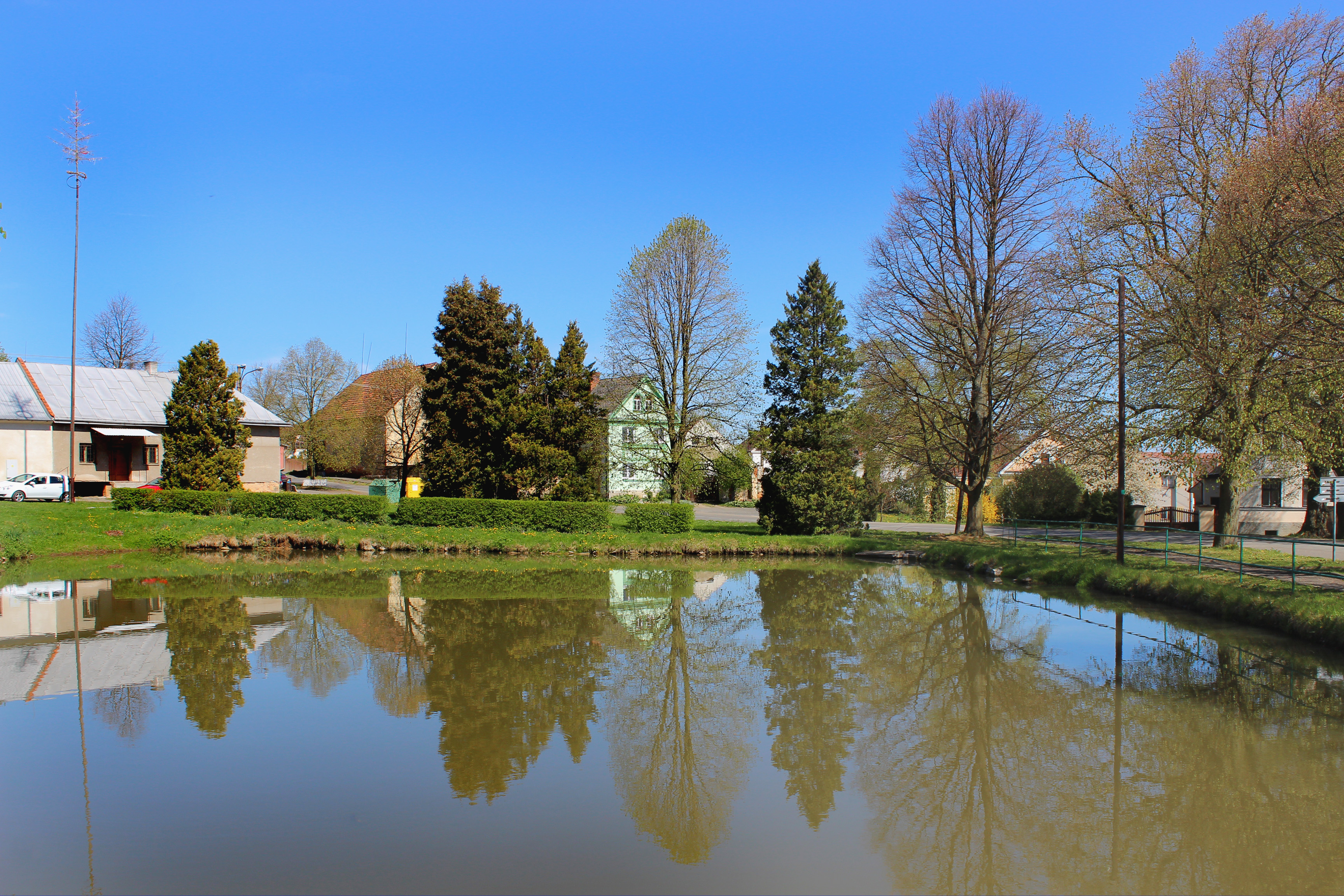
- Common pond

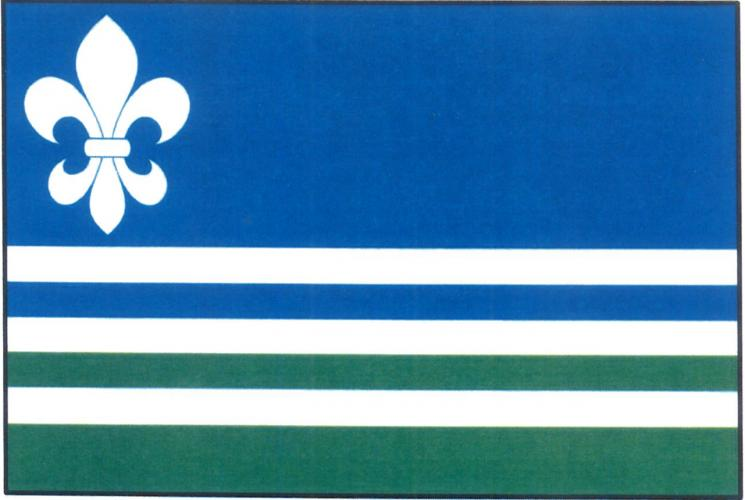
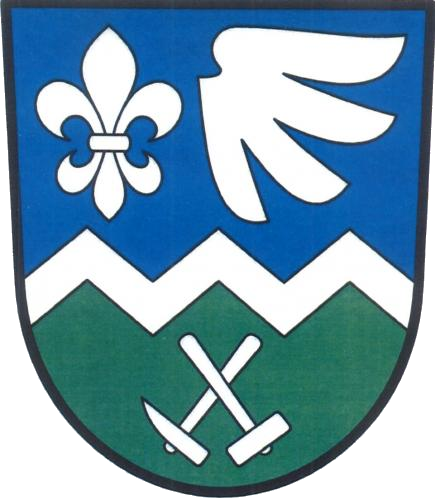
- Flag Coat of arms

- Location in the Czech Republic
- Coordinates: 49°48′9″N 12°59′50″E
- Country: Czech Republic
- Region: Plzeň
- District: Tachov
- First mentioned: 1369

Area
  - Total: 15.44 km^{2} (5.96 sq mi)
- Elevation: 488 m (1,601 ft)

Population (2026-01-01)
  - Total: 238
  - Density: 15.4/km^{2} (39.9/sq mi)
- Time zone: UTC+1 (CET)
  - Summer (DST): UTC+2 (CEST)
- Postal code: 349 01
- Website: www.obec-ksice.cz

Kšice (German: Kscheutz) is a municipality and village in Tachov District in the Plzeň Region of the Czech Republic. It has about 200 inhabitants.

== Administrative division ==
Kšice consists of two municipal parts (in brackets population according to the 2021 census):

- Kšice (196)
- Lomnička (24)

== Etymology ==
The name Kšice has its root in the Old Czech word kšice, meaning 'long hair'. It is not certain whether it was the name of a settler or the name of a forested mountain.

== Geography ==
Kšice is located about 25 kilometres (16 mi) east of Tachov and 27 km (17 mi) west of Plzeň. It lies in the Plasy Uplands. The highest point is the hill Stelka at 547 m (1,795 ft) above sea level.

== History ==
The first written mention of Kšice is from 1369. It was then part of the Stříbro estate. Silver and lead were mined in the vicinity of the village. At the end of the 19th century, the last mine was closed down.

After the Munich Agreement in 1938, the village was annexed by Nazi Germany and administered as part of the Reichsgau Sudetenland.

In 1971, Lomnička was joined to the municipality. From 1980 to 1991, Kšice was a municipal part of Stříbro. Since 1992, it has been a separate municipality.

== Demographics ==
Historical population

Year	Pop.	±%
1869	568	—
1880	679	+19.5%
1890	635	−6.5%
1900	625	−1.6%
1910	669	+7.0%

Year	Pop.	±%
1921	629	−6.0%
1930	553	−12.1%
1950	338	−38.9%
1961	298	−11.8%
1970	284	−4.7%

Year	Pop.	±%
1980	215	−24.3%
1991	192	−10.7%
2001	184	−4.2%
2011	189	+2.7%
2021	220	+16.4%

Source: Censuses

== Transport ==
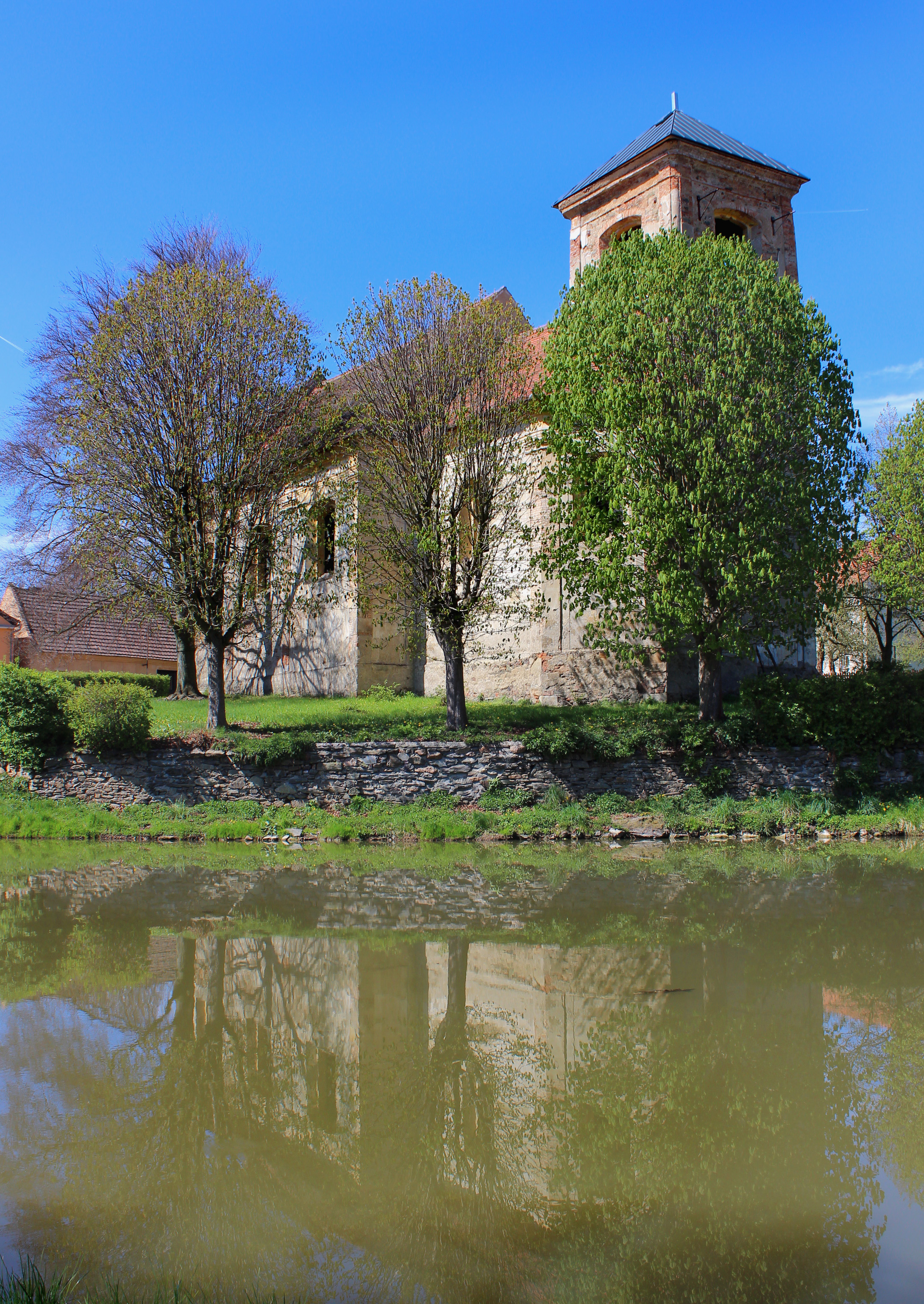
Church of the Assumption of the Virgin Mary

The village of Lomnička is located on the railway line Radnice–Bezdružice via Plzeň.

== Sights ==
The main landmark of Kšice is the Church of the Assumption of the Virgin Mary. A predecessor of the church was a Gothic building, first documented in 1384. The current church was built in the Baroque style in 1716.
