= Philip Bruce White =

British microbiologist (1891–1949)

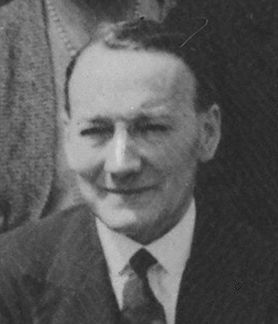
- Born: 29 December 1891; Bangor, Gwynedd, North Wales
- Died: 19 March 1949 (aged 57); London, England

Philip Bruce White (29 December 1891 – 19 March 1949) was a British microbiologist. He is notable for developing a classification system for salmonella bacteria which later became known as the Kauffman-White classification.

== Biography ==
White was born in Bangor, Gwynedd, North Wales on 29 December 1891, as the eldest of three children. His father. Philip Jacob, was a lecturer in zoology at the University College of North Wales. They lived in a house overlooking the Menai Strait where Jacob was heavily involved in setting up a biological study station on Puffin Island where his son White spent the majority of his childhood. Griffith Evans, a Welsh bacteriologist who discovered trypanosoma evansi, was also a family friend who regularly visited the family with tales of his work as a veterinary officer in British India which White later highlighted in his memoirs as being an inspiration to his future work.

He completed a bachelor's degree in zoology and botany at the University College of North Wales in 1915.

In 1926, White published a schema for classifying salmonella bacteria based on serum. This was later extended by the Danish microbiologist Fritz Kauffmann, the Kauffman–White classification.

White became a fellow of the Royal Society on 20 March 1941.

He died in London on 19 March 1949 at age 57. He was survived by his wife and two sons.
