= Edmund Weil =

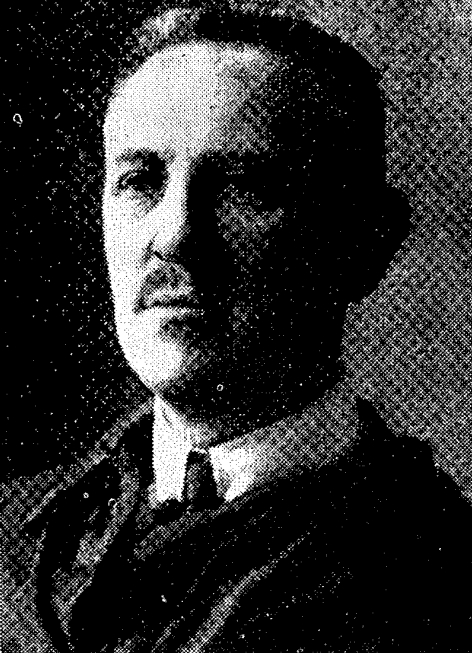

Edmund Weil (16 April 1879 – 15 June 1922) was a German Bohemian bacteriologist. He is best known for the Weil–Felix test used in the diagnosis of rickettsial infections. He conducted this research during World War I and died from an accidental typhus infection in his laboratory.

== Life and work ==
Weil was born in Stráž, son of merchant Simon and Adelheid née Kohner. After education at Cheb and Plzeň he went to study medicine at the University of Prague. After graduating in 1903, he became a pathologist in Berlin. In 1905, he became an assistant to Hans Chiari at the serology department at the University of Prague and habilitated in 1909. In 1911 he worked with Viktor Kafka on the reaction of cerebrospinal fluid with blood. In 1913, he was proposed as a professor but an appointment was made only in 1915.

He worked briefly at the laboratory of Rudolf Weigl. During World War I, he worked in laboratories on the Galician and Balkan borders. He had to work with soldiers affected by typhus and was able to establish a sero-diagnostic test in 1916 which is called the Weil–Felix test. It involves placing patient's serum in a suspension with enteric bacteria (Proteus sp.). The antibodies formed against rickettsia react with the bacteria but the test is no longer used due to its non-specificity.

When a colleague, Friedrick Brienl accidentally sprayed some rickettsia while injecting a laboratory animal and it is thought that Weil too contracted a form of typhus and died at the Institute of Hygiene where he worked. He died on 15 June 1922 in Prague, at the age of 43.
