= Přimda =

- Town
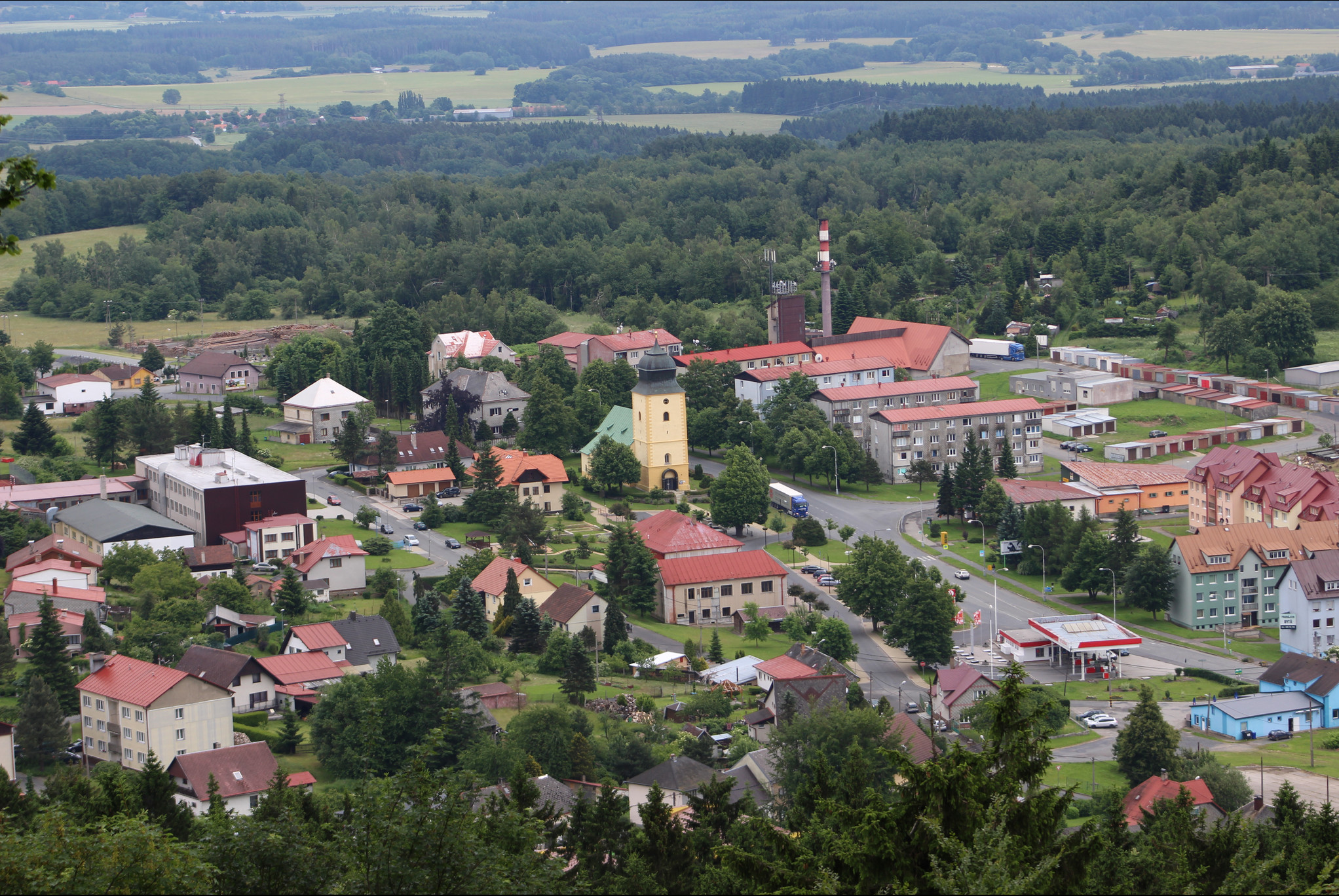
- View from the northwest

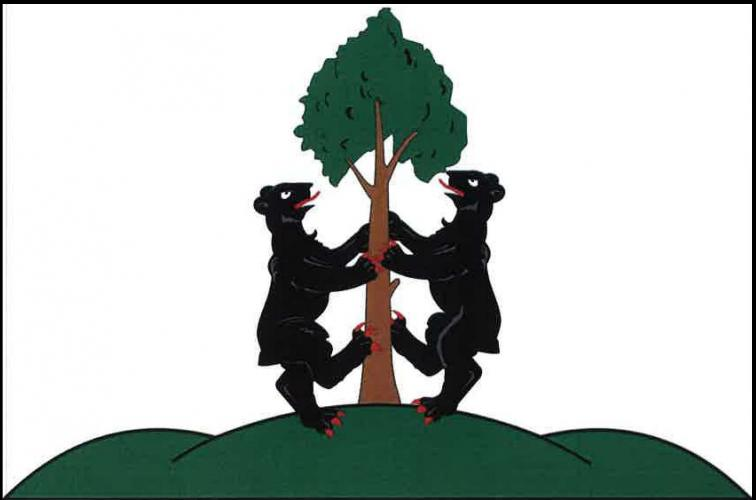
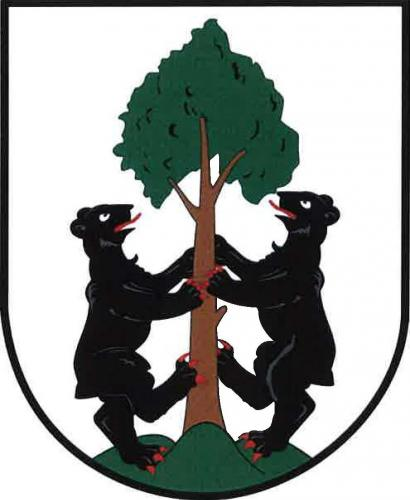
- Flag Coat of arms

- Location in the Czech Republic
- Coordinates: 49°40′24″N 12°40′12″E
- Country: Czech Republic
- Region: Plzeň
- District: Tachov
- First mentioned: 1126

Government
  - Mayor: Jan Junek

Area
  - Total: 50.63 km^{2} (19.55 sq mi)
- Elevation: 601 m (1,972 ft)

Population (2026-01-01)
  - Total: 1,555
  - Density: 30.71/km^{2} (79.55/sq mi)
- Time zone: UTC+1 (CET)
  - Summer (DST): UTC+2 (CEST)
- Postal code: 348 06
- Website: www.mestoprimda.cz

Přimda (Czech pronunciation: [ˈpr̝̊ɪmda]; German: Pfraumberg) is a town in Tachov District the Plzeň Region of the Czech Republic. It has about 1,600 inhabitants. The town is located in the Upper Palatinate Forest range.

Přimda is known for the ruin of the Přimda Castle, which is the second oldest castle in the Czech Republic, protected as a national cultural monument.

== Administrative division ==
Přimda consists of nine municipal parts (in brackets population according to the 2021 census):

- Přimda (816)
- Kundratice (53)
- Malé Dvorce (32)
- Málkov (13)
- Mlýnec (32)
- Rájov (23)
- Třískolupy (102)
- Újezd pod Přimdou (115)
- Velké Dvorce (218)

== Etymology ==
The origin of the name Přimda is uncertain and there are many theories about its origin. According to some theories, the name is of Slavic origin and derived from the word prêmda, which meant 'very faint'. It originally denoted the hill Přimda and the stream that originates at its foot, and later it was transferred to the castle and the settlement. If the German name Pfraumberg was earlier, it may have been derived from Pfrieme, denoting the Stipa plant. The Illyrian origin of the name is also not excluded.

== Geography ==
Přimda is located about 14 kilometres (9 mi) south of Tachov and 50 km (31 mi) west of Plzeň. It lies in the Upper Palatinate Forest range. The highest point is the Přimda hill at 848 m (2,782 ft) above sea level. The Úhlavka River originates east of the town. The area is rich in small streams. The municipal territory extends into the Český les Protected Landscape Area in the southwest.

=== Climate ===
Přimda's climate is classified as humid continental climate (Köppen Dfb). The annual average temperature is 7.0 °C (44.6 °F), the hottest month in July is 16.6 °C (61.9 °F), and the coldest month is −2.4 °C (27.7 °F) in January. The annual precipitation is 747.9 millimetres (29.44 in), of which July is the wettest with 81.7 millimetres (3.22 in), while April is the driest with only 42.7 millimetres (1.68 in). The extreme temperature throughout the year ranged from −22.7 °C (−8.9 °F) on 9 January 1985 and 14 January 1987 to 36.6 °C (97.9 °F) on 3 August 2003.

Climate data for Přimda (1991−2020 normals, extremes 1961−present)
Month	Jan	Feb	Mar	Apr	May	Jun	Jul	Aug	Sep	Oct	Nov	Dec	Year
Record high °C (°F)	12.1 (53.8)	16.5 (61.7)	21.7 (71.1)	27.4 (81.3)	30.5 (86.9)	32.5 (90.5)	35.6 (96.1)	36.6 (97.9)	29.4 (84.9)	24.5 (76.1)	16.5 (61.7)	15.0 (59.0)	36.6 (97.9)
Mean daily maximum °C (°F)	−0.3 (31.5)	1.3 (34.3)	6.0 (42.8)	12.1 (53.8)	16.4 (61.5)	19.8 (67.6)	21.7 (71.1)	21.6 (70.9)	16.1 (61.0)	10.0 (50.0)	3.8 (38.8)	0.2 (32.4)	10.7 (51.3)
Daily mean °C (°F)	−2.4 (27.7)	−1.5 (29.3)	2.1 (35.8)	7.2 (45.0)	11.4 (52.5)	14.8 (58.6)	16.6 (61.9)	16.4 (61.5)	11.8 (53.2)	6.8 (44.2)	1.8 (35.2)	−1.6 (29.1)	7.0 (44.6)
Mean daily minimum °C (°F)	−4.4 (24.1)	−3.9 (25.0)	−0.8 (30.6)	3.2 (37.8)	7.3 (45.1)	10.7 (51.3)	12.4 (54.3)	12.4 (54.3)	8.6 (47.5)	4.4 (39.9)	−0.1 (31.8)	−3.4 (25.9)	3.9 (39.0)
Record low °C (°F)	−22.7 (−8.9)	−21.9 (−7.4)	−17.7 (0.1)	−8.5 (16.7)	−3.8 (25.2)	0.6 (33.1)	3.4 (38.1)	2.8 (37.0)	−0.7 (30.7)	−7.1 (19.2)	−13.7 (7.3)	−20.6 (−5.1)	−22.7 (−8.9)
Average precipitation mm (inches)	62.2 (2.45)	47.3 (1.86)	52.4 (2.06)	42.7 (1.68)	62.8 (2.47)	75.3 (2.96)	81.7 (3.22)	78.4 (3.09)	63.7 (2.51)	58.0 (2.28)	55.9 (2.20)	67.5 (2.66)	747.9 (29.44)
Average precipitation days (≥ 1.0 mm)	12.0	9.4	10.4	8.1	10.8	11.0	11.8	10.2	9.0	10.4	10.1	12.6	125.6
Mean monthly sunshine hours	41.9	74.9	118.5	183.1	213.3	220.0	236.4	229.6	159.9	98.9	40.4	29.8	1,646.6
Source 1: NOAA
Source 2: Czech Hydrometeorological Institute (extremes)

== History ==
According to Chronica Boemorum, a castle was founded in the area of Přimda in 1121, but it is uncertain whether Přimda is meant by this castle. The first written mention of the Přimda Castle is from 1126, when Duke Soběslav I rebuilt the castle. It was then an important border fortress. The castle also served as a royal prison, where Soběslav II, later duke of Bohemia was imprisoned twice in the 12th century and Ottokar II, later king of Bohemia, was imprisoned in 1249. The first written mention of the settlement Přimda is in a deed of King John of Bohemia from 1331, when it was already referred to as a town. In the 15th and 16th centuries, Přimda was pledged to various noble families, most notably to the Schwambergs, who held it in 1454–1592. in 1592, Emperor Rudolf II sold off the estate. In 1609, the Přimda Castle was described as ruined and abandoned. From 1675, until the establishment of a sovereign municipality, the estate was property of a branch of the Kolowrat family, which chose Velké Dvorce as the centre of the estate.

The worst event in the history of the town was the bombing during World War II, when on 20 April 1945, most of the town burned down. After World War II, the German-speaking population was expelled and Přimda was partly resettled by Czech families from inland and from Romania.

== Demographics ==
Historical population

Year	Pop.	±%
1869	3,017	—
1880	2,999	−0.6%
1890	2,924	−2.5%
1900	2,910	−0.5%
1910	3,020	+3.8%

Year	Pop.	±%
1921	2,888	−4.4%
1930	2,825	−2.2%
1950	1,038	−63.3%
1961	1,117	+7.6%
1970	1,006	−9.9%

Year	Pop.	±%
1980	1,096	+8.9%
1991	1,282	+17.0%
2001	1,358	+5.9%
2011	1,481	+9.1%
2021	1,404	−5.2%

Source: Censuses

== Transport ==
The D5 motorway (part of the European route E50), which connects Plzeň with the Czech–German border in Rozvadov, runs through the northern part of the municipal territory.

== Sights ==
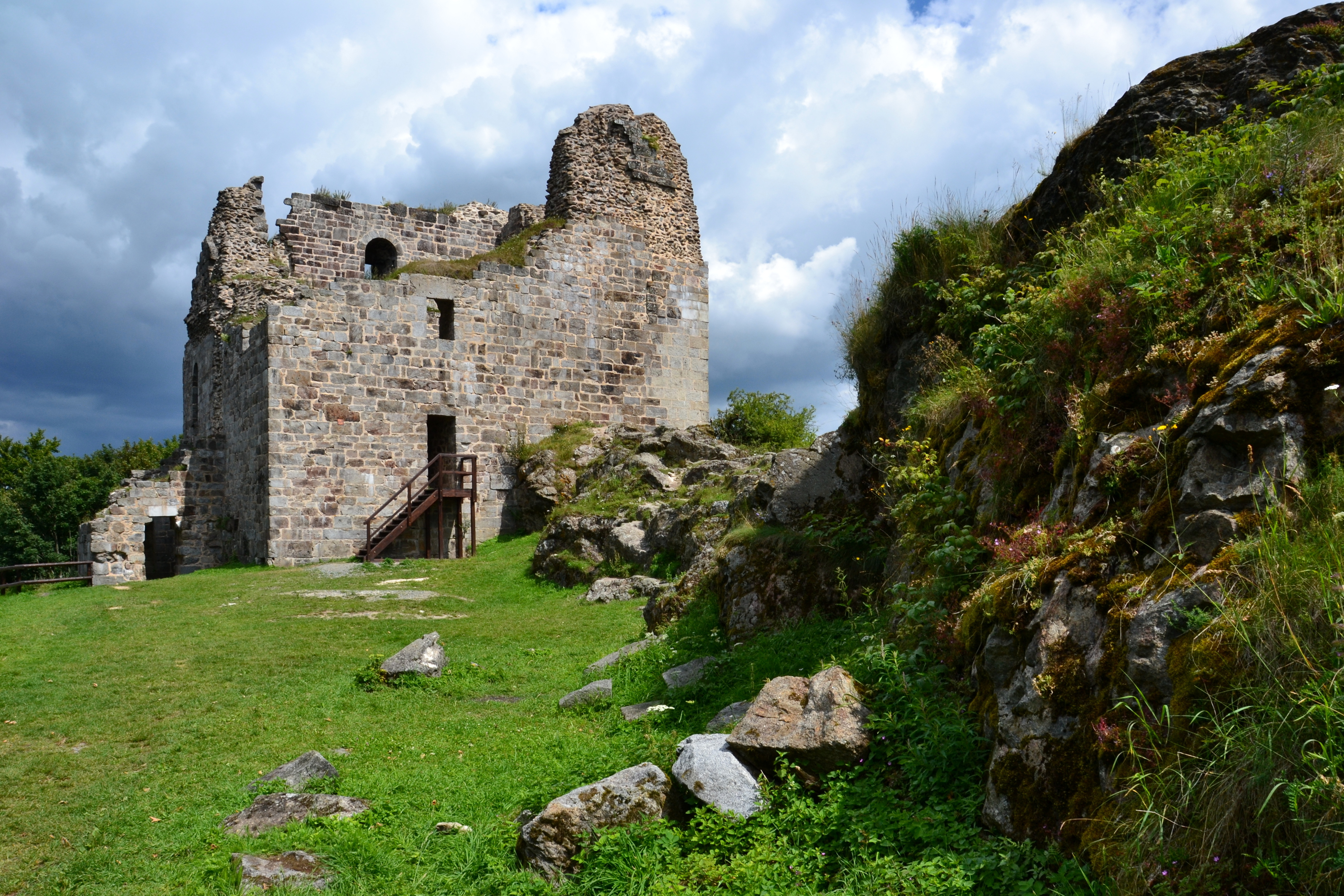
Přimda Castle

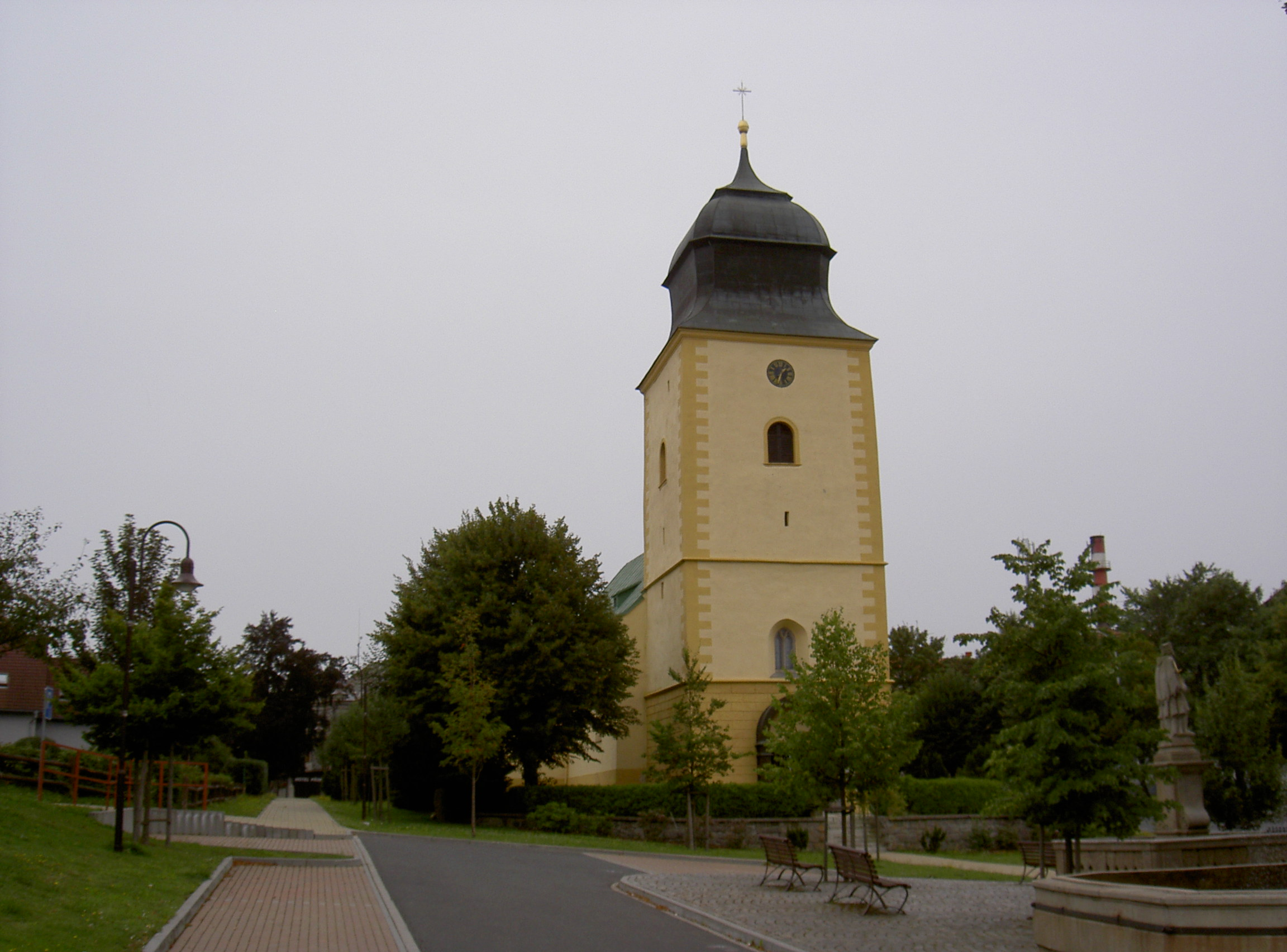
Church of Saint George

The town is known for the Romanesque Přimda Castle, a ruin of the second oldest castle in the country (after Prague Castle). It is located on the Přimda hill. A massive prismatic tower from the first half of the 12th century has been preserved. The ruin is protected as a national cultural monument. Today it is owned by the state and offers guided tours.

The Church of Saint George is the main landmark of the town square with a rich architectural history. It was originally built in the Romanesque style, then it was rebuilt in the Gothic style in the mid-14th century. Around 1500, the Gothic tower was added. Renaissance and early Baroque modifications were made in the 17th century. After the fire in 1945, it was reconstructed to its present form.

In Velké Dvorce is Velké Dvorce Castle, which served as the residence of the Kolowrat family. It was built in the early Baroque style in 1690 and further expanded in the 18th century. Neoclassical modifications were made in the second half of the 19th century and pseudo-Baroque modifications in 1906. Next to the building is a dendrologically valuable park with many exotic woods. Today the castle is privately owned, unused and decaying.

== Twin towns – sister cities ==
Přimda is twinned with:

- Pfreimd, Germany
