= Kladruby (Tachov District) =

- Town
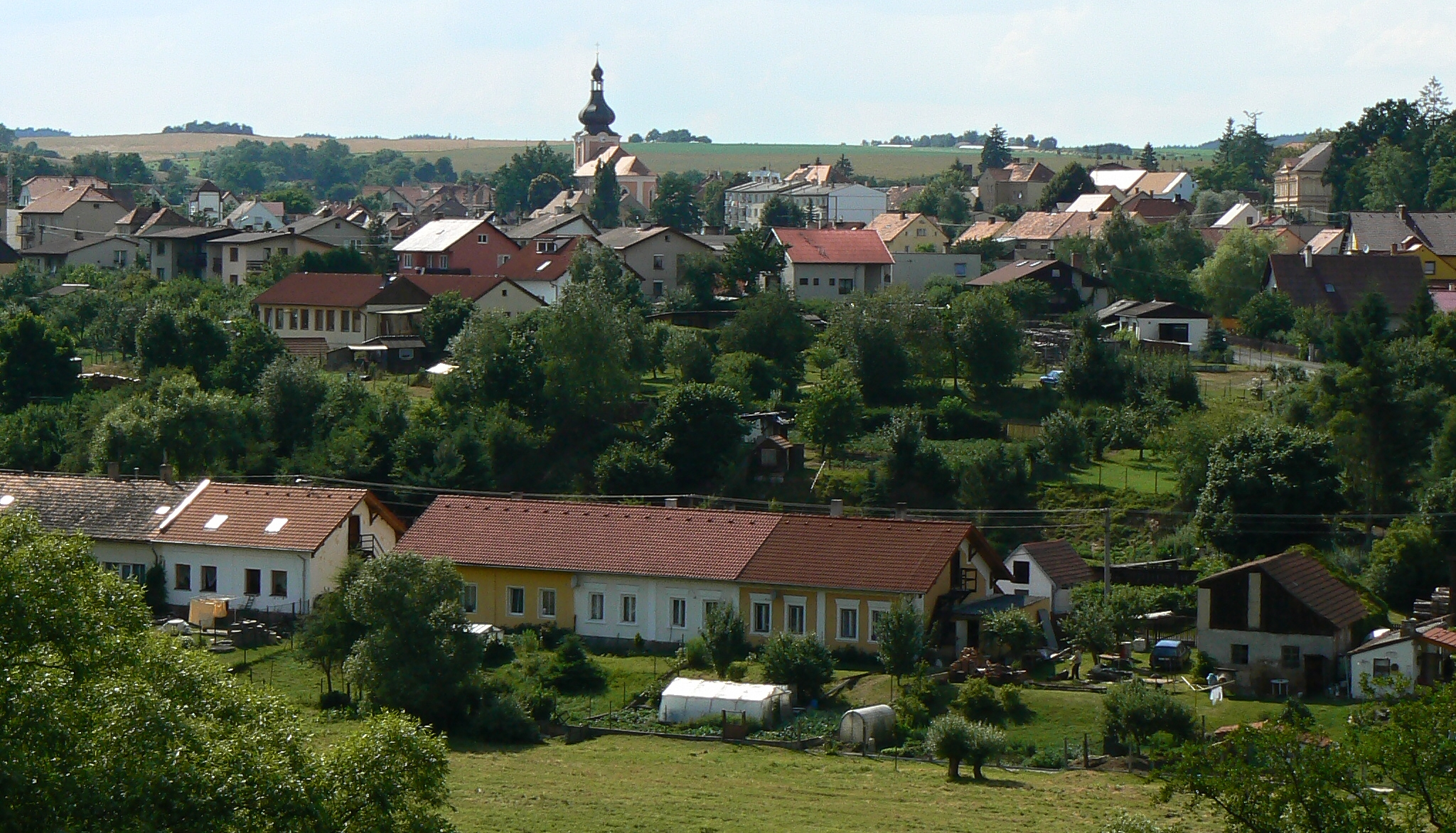
- View of Kladruby from the monastery

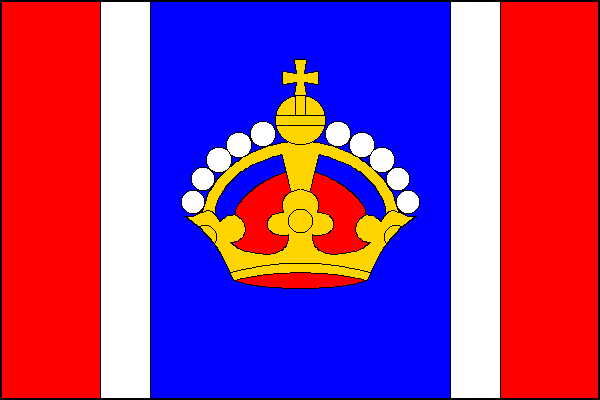
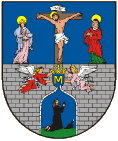
- Flag Coat of arms

- Location in the Czech Republic
- Coordinates: 49°42′55″N 12°58′48″E
- Country: Czech Republic
- Region: Plzeň
- District: Tachov
- Founded: 1115

Government
  - Mayor: Hana Floriánová

Area
  - Total: 48.59 km^{2} (18.76 sq mi)
- Elevation: 413 m (1,355 ft)

Population (2026-01-01)
  - Total: 1,668
  - Density: 34.33/km^{2} (88.91/sq mi)
- Time zone: UTC+1 (CET)
  - Summer (DST): UTC+2 (CEST)
- Postal code: 349 61
- Website: www.kladruby.cz

Kladruby (Czech pronunciation: [ˈkladrubɪ]; German: Kladrau) is a town in Tachov District in the Plzeň Region of the Czech Republic. It has about 1,700 inhabitants. The town is located on the Úhlavka River in the Plasy Uplands.

Kladruby was founded in 1115 and became a town around 1233. The town is known for the Kladruby Monastery, which is protected as a national cultural monument.

== Administrative division ==
Kladruby consists of seven municipal parts (in brackets population according to the 2021 census):

- Kladruby (1,279)
- Brod u Stříbra (67)
- Láz (48)
- Milevo (45)
- Pozorka (41)
- Tuněchody (30)
- Vrbice u Stříbra (47)

== Etymology ==
The name Kladruby is a common Czech name of settlements, derived from kláda (i.e. 'log') and rubat (i.e. 'to chop'). This name was used for settlements where lumberjacks lived.

== Geography ==
Kladruby is located about 27 kilometres (17 mi) west of Plzeň. It lies in the Plasy Uplands. The highest point is the hill Pastvina at 528 m (1,732 ft) above sea level. The Úhlavka River flows through the town.

== History ==
The Kladruby village was founded together with the Kladruby Monastery in 1115. Around 1233, a new royal town was founded by King Wenceslaus I. Due to power struggles between the King Wenceslaus IV and Archbishop Jan of Jenštejn at the end of the 14th century and the Hussite Wars in the first half of the 15th century, the monastery lost its influence and economic decline occurred. The monastery had to sell off its property and the German inhabitants of the town returned to Germany.

At the end of the 15th and the beginning of the 16th century, the development of crafts took place in Kladruby. In the second half of the 16th century, the town received various privileges from the monastery abbots and from the emperors Maximilian II and Rudolf II. Prosperity ended due to the Thirty Years' War, during which the town and monastery were repeatedly looted. During the war, the population of Kladruby decreased significantly. The town was resettled by German immigrants, who gradually formed the majority. In 1785, the monastery was abolished by the decree of Emperor Joseph II. In 1825, the former monastery was acquired by the Windisch-Graetz family, who had converted the building into a brewery.

== Demographics ==
Historical population

Year	Pop.	±%
1869	2,693	—
1880	2,657	−1.3%
1890	2,754	+3.7%
1900	2,817	+2.3%
1910	2,751	−2.3%

Year	Pop.	±%
1921	2,898	+5.3%
1930	2,480	−14.4%
1950	1,219	−50.8%
1961	1,354	+11.1%
1970	1,283	−5.2%

Year	Pop.	±%
1980	1,381	+7.6%
1991	1,304	−5.6%
2001	1,398	+7.2%
2011	1,496	+7.0%
2021	1,557	+4.1%

Source: Censuses

== Transport ==
The D5 motorway (part of the European route E50) from Plzeň to the Czech–German border in Rozvadov runs through the municipal territory.

== Culture ==
Since 1977, the Kladruby Summer Music Festival focused on classical music has been held in the premises of the Kladruby Monastery.

== Sights ==
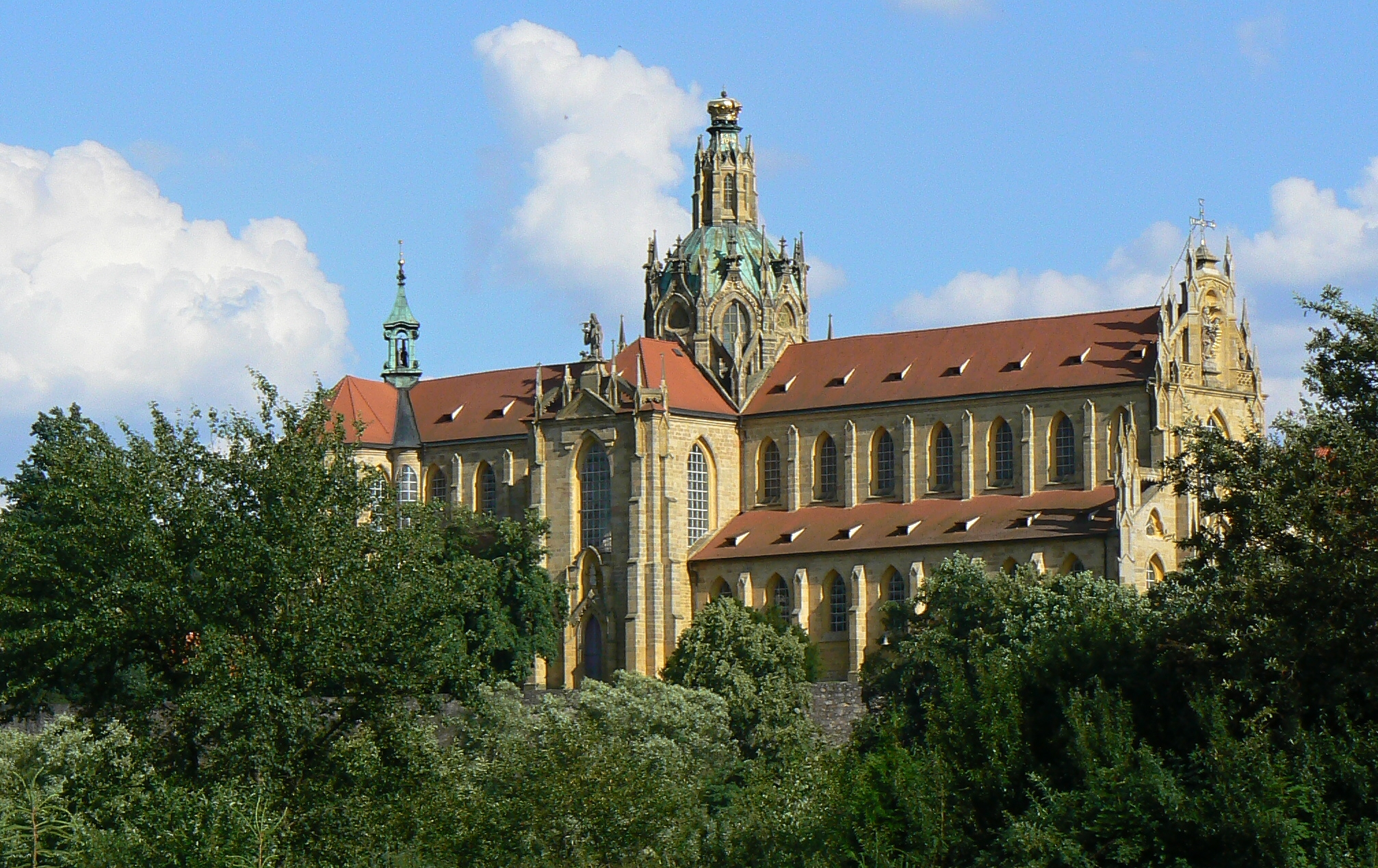
Kladruby Monastery

The most important monument is the Kladruby Monastery, located in the Pozorka part of Kladruby. It is a large Benedictine monastery founded in 1115 by Duke Vladislaus I. The Church of the Assumption of the Virgin Mary, originally built in the Romanesque style in 1233, was rebuilt in the late Baroque style in 1712–1726 by architect Jan Santini Aichel. Today, the premises of the monastery are used for organising cultural and social events. Due to its architectural value, the monastery is protected as a national cultural monument.

The main landmark of the town centre is the Church of Saint James the Great. It was built in the Baroque style in 1772–1779, on the site of an older church.

== Notable people ==
- Ladislav Žemla (1887–1955), tennis player
