= Spáňov =

- Municipality
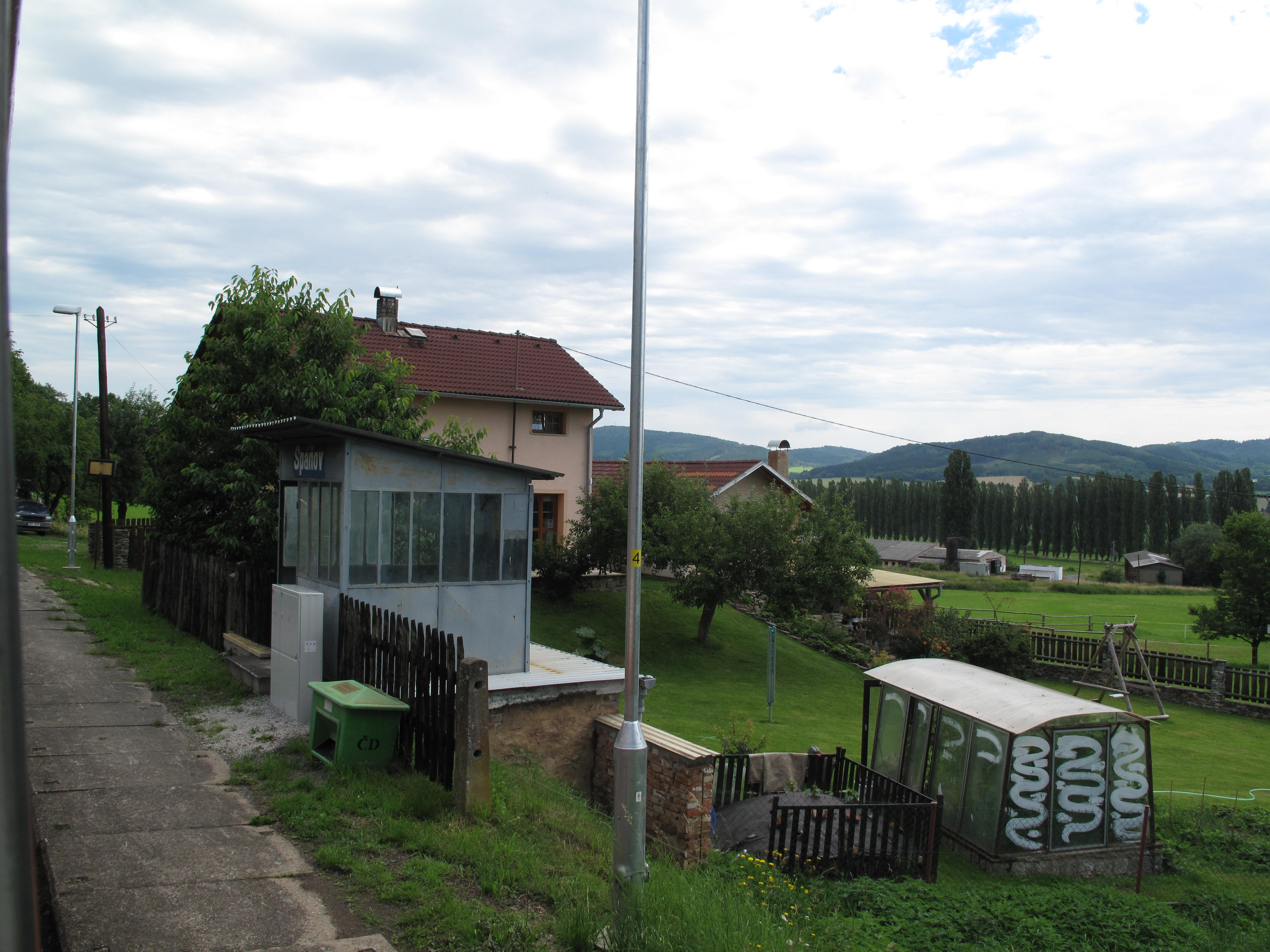
- Train stop

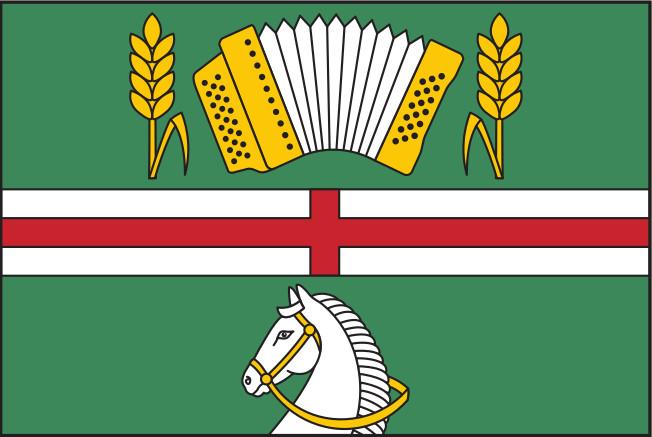
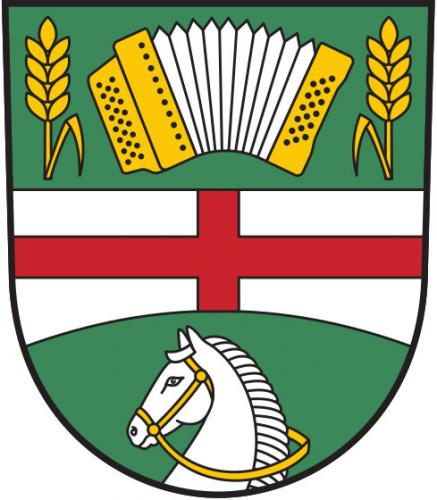
- Flag Coat of arms

- Location in the Czech Republic
- Coordinates: 49°24′53″N 12°59′14″E
- Country: Czech Republic
- Region: Plzeň
- District: Domažlice
- First mentioned: 1372

Area
  - Total: 3.27 km^{2} (1.26 sq mi)
- Elevation: 435 m (1,427 ft)

Population (2026-01-01)
  - Total: 214
  - Density: 65.4/km^{2} (169/sq mi)
- Time zone: UTC+1 (CET)
  - Summer (DST): UTC+2 (CEST)
- Postal code: 344 01
- Website: www.spanov.cz

Spáňov is a municipality and village in Domažlice District in the Plzeň Region of the Czech Republic. It has about 200 inhabitants.

Spáňov lies approximately 5 kilometres (3 mi) south-east of Domažlice, 47 km (29 mi) south-west of Plzeň, and 128 km (80 mi) south-west of Prague.

== Demographics ==
Historical population
| Year | Pop. | ±% |
|---|---|---|
| 1869 | 238 | — |
| 1880 | 199 | −16.4% |
| 1890 | 176 | −11.6% |
| 1900 | 209 | +18.8% |
| 1910 | 230 | +10.0% |
| 1921 | 203 | −11.7% |
| 1930 | 208 | +2.5% |
| 1950 | 177 | −14.9% |
| 1961 | 173 | −2.3% |
| 1970 | 159 | −8.1% |
| 1980 | 173 | +8.8% |
| 1991 | 174 | +0.6% |
| 2001 | 187 | +7.5% |
| 2011 | 180 | −3.7% |
| 2021 | 211 | +17.2% |
Source: Censuses
