= Nevolice =

- Municipality
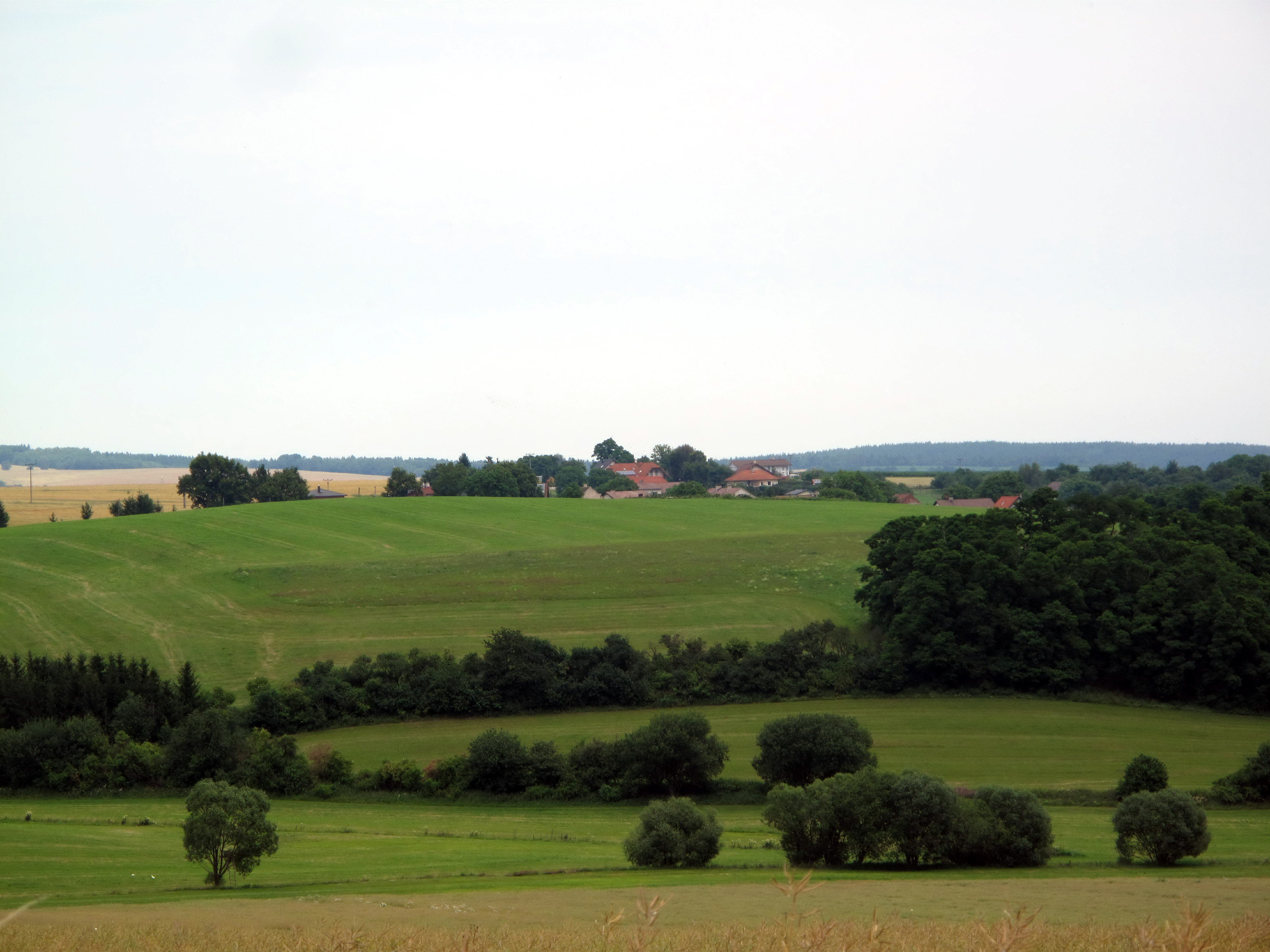
- View from the west

- Location in the Czech Republic
- Coordinates: 49°25′14″N 12°56′0″E
- Country: Czech Republic
- Region: Plzeň
- District: Domažlice
- First mentioned: 1392

Area
  - Total: 2.56 km^{2} (0.99 sq mi)
- Elevation: 477 m (1,565 ft)

Population (2026-01-01)
  - Total: 197
  - Density: 77.0/km^{2} (199/sq mi)
- Time zone: UTC+1 (CET)
  - Summer (DST): UTC+2 (CEST)
- Postal code: 344 01
- Website: www.nevolice.cz

Nevolice is a municipality and village in Domažlice District in the Plzeň Region of the Czech Republic. It has about 200 inhabitants.

Nevolice lies approximately 3 kilometres (2 mi) south of Domažlice, 49 km (30 mi) south-west of Plzeň, and 131 km (81 mi) south-west of Prague.

== Demographics ==
Historical population
Year	Pop.	±%
1869	258	—
1880	224	−13.2%
1890	194	−13.4%
1900	209	+7.7%
1910	249	+19.1%
1921	262	+5.2%
1930	247	−5.7%
1950	184	−25.5%
1961	198	+7.6%
1970	183	−7.6%
1980	152	−16.9%
1991	140	−7.9%
2001	163	+16.4%
2011	169	+3.7%
2021	176	+4.1%
Source: Censuses
