= Únějovice =

- Municipality
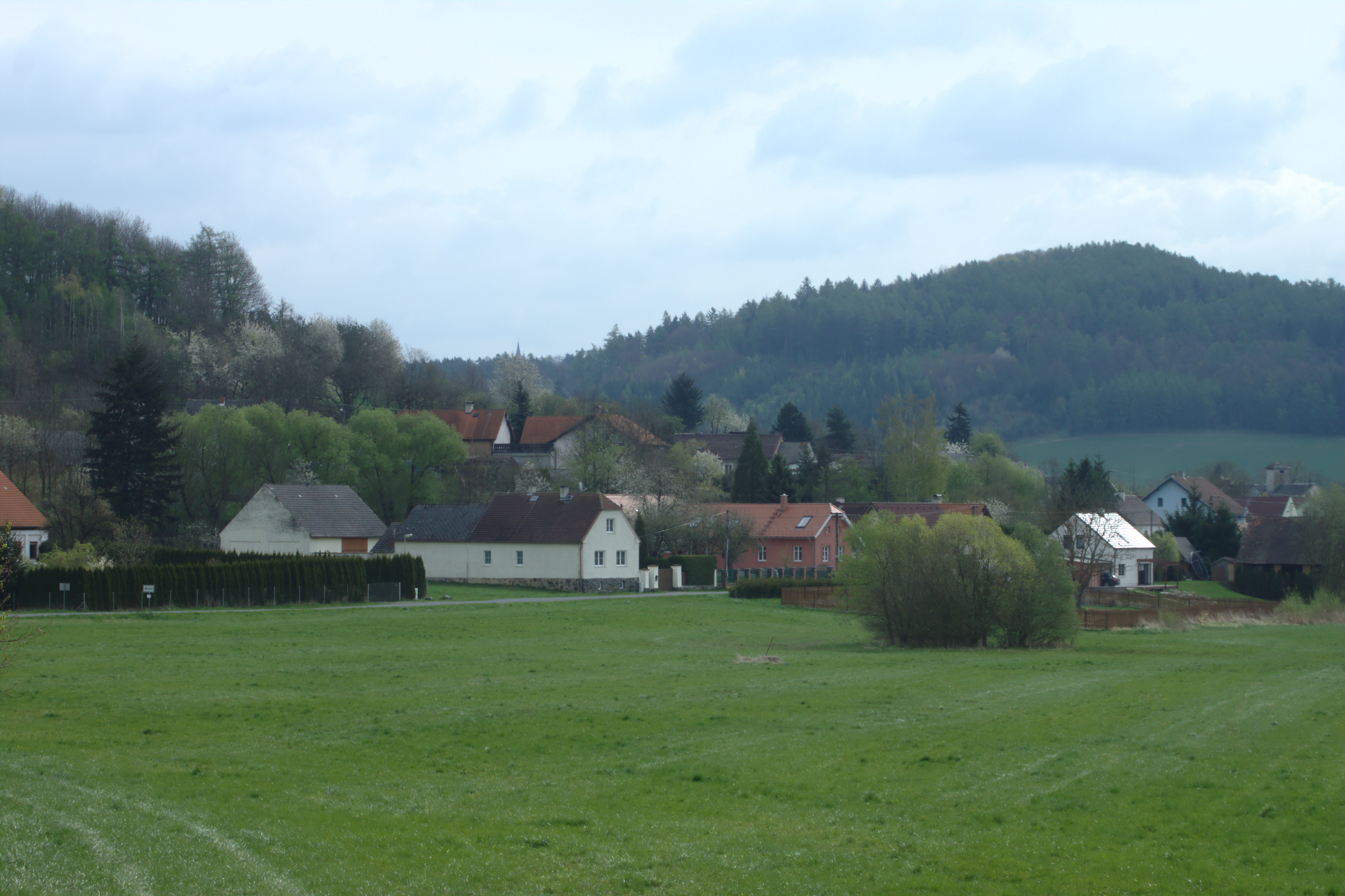
- View from the west

- Location in the Czech Republic
- Coordinates: 49°27′44″N 13°7′7″E
- Country: Czech Republic
- Region: Plzeň
- District: Domažlice
- First mentioned: 1379

Area
  - Total: 3.93 km^{2} (1.52 sq mi)
- Elevation: 458 m (1,503 ft)

Population (2026-01-01)
  - Total: 107
  - Density: 27.2/km^{2} (70.5/sq mi)
- Time zone: UTC+1 (CET)
  - Summer (DST): UTC+2 (CEST)
- Postal code: 345 43
- Website: www.unejovice.cz

Únějovice is a municipality and village in Domažlice District in the Plzeň Region of the Czech Republic. It has about 100 inhabitants.

Únějovice lies approximately 14 kilometres (9 mi) east of Domažlice, 37 km (23 mi) south-west of Plzeň, and 117 km (73 mi) south-west of Prague.

== Demographics ==
Historical population
Year	Pop.	±%
1869	284	—
1880	260	−8.5%
1890	286	+10.0%
1900	280	−2.1%
1910	250	−10.7%
1921	273	+9.2%
1930	283	+3.7%
1950	190	−32.9%
1961	183	−3.7%
1970	153	−16.4%
1980	100	−34.6%
1991	72	−28.0%
2001	76	+5.6%
2011	104	+36.8%
2021	98	−5.8%
Source: Censuses
