= Úboč =

- Municipality
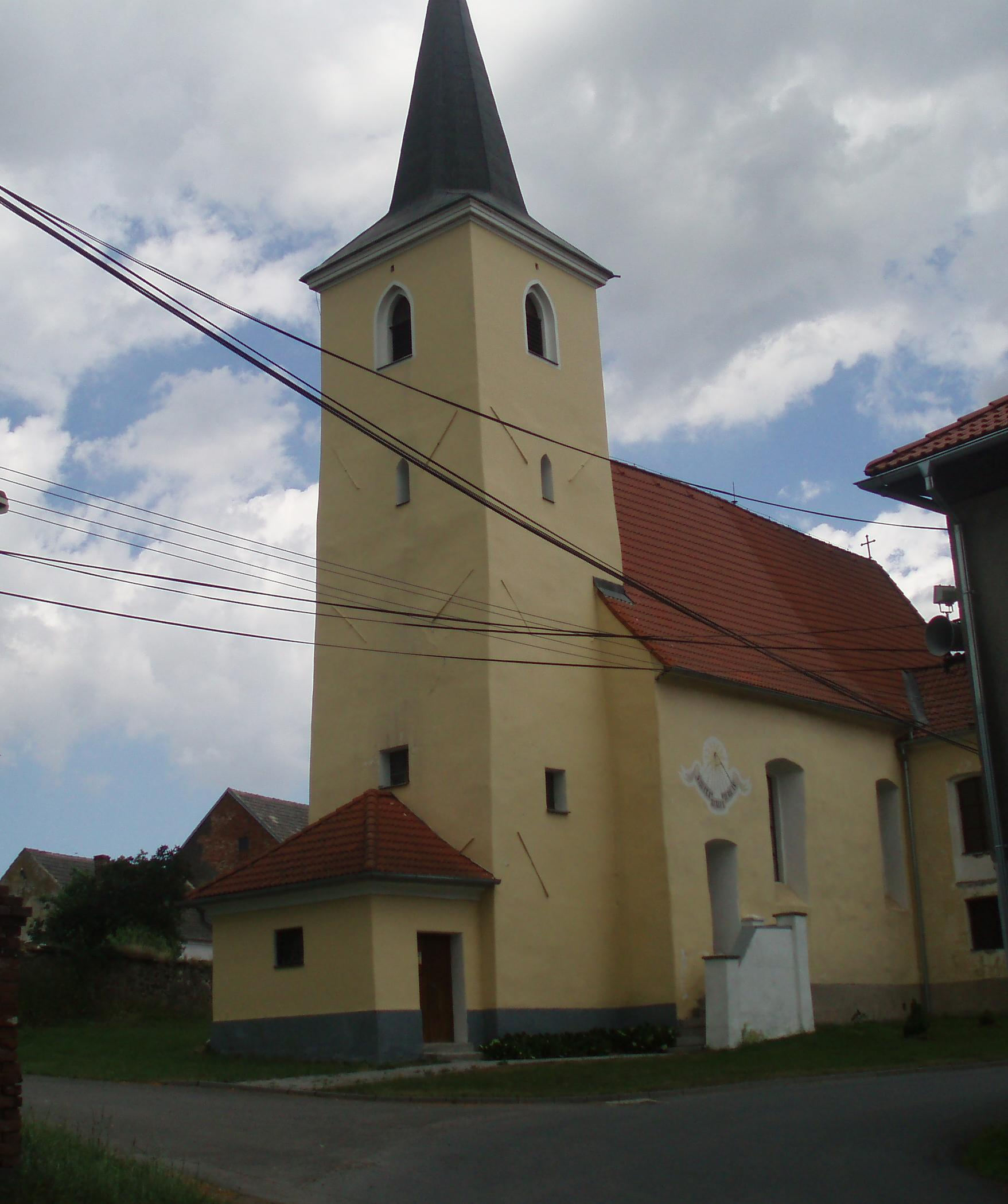
- Church of Saint Nicholas

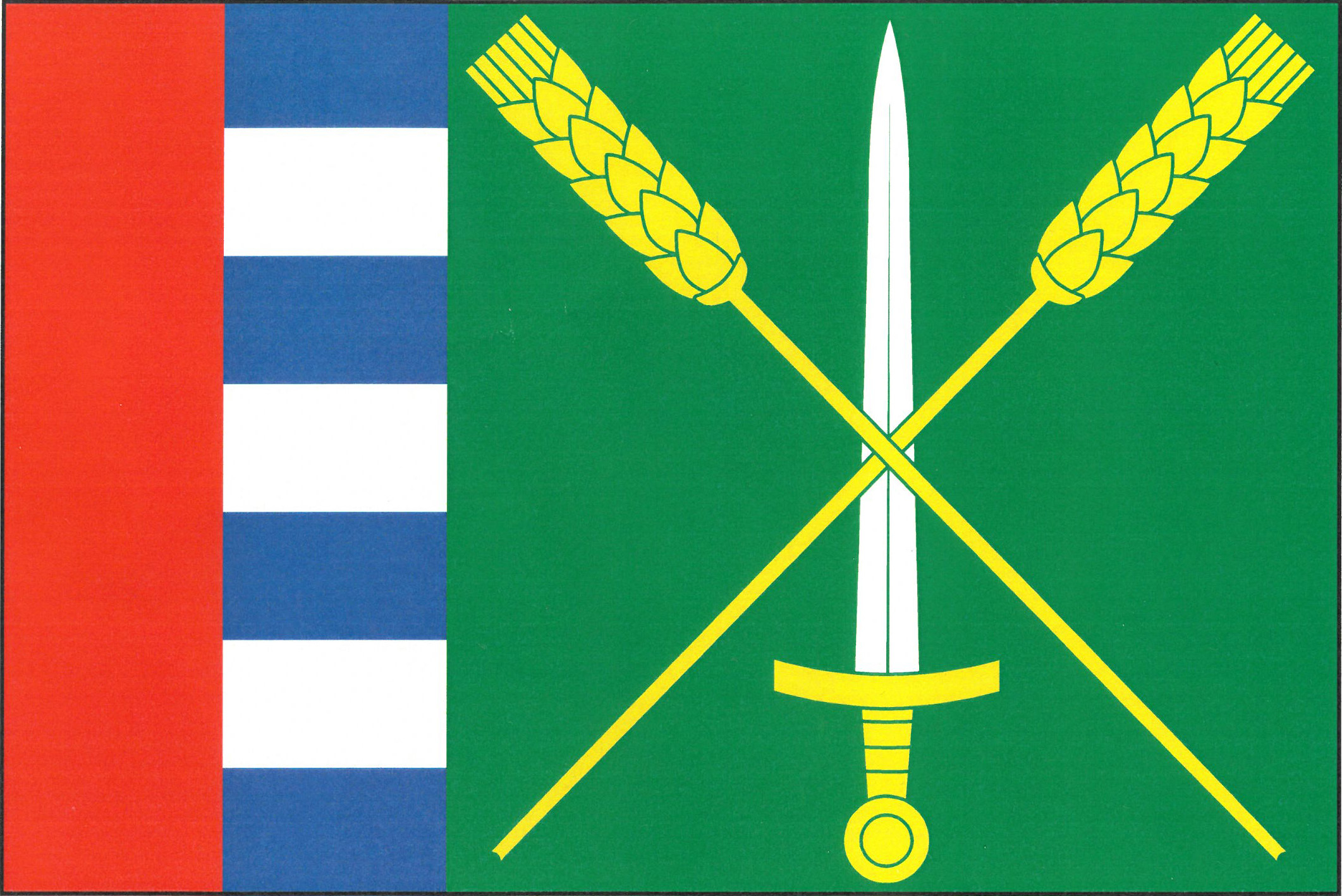
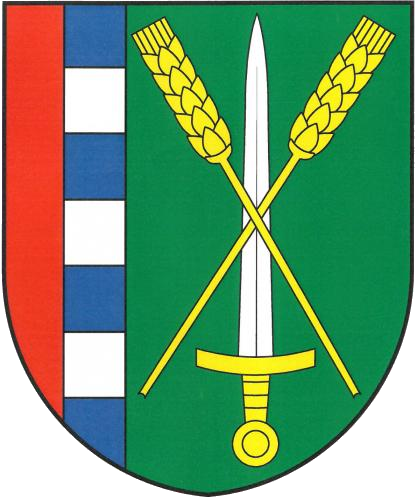
- Flag Coat of arms

- Location in the Czech Republic
- Coordinates: 49°26′37″N 13°5′13″E
- Country: Czech Republic
- Region: Plzeň
- District: Domažlice
- First mentioned: 1251

Area
  - Total: 7.45 km^{2} (2.88 sq mi)
- Elevation: 498 m (1,634 ft)

Population (2026-01-01)
  - Total: 159
  - Density: 21.3/km^{2} (55.3/sq mi)
- Time zone: UTC+1 (CET)
  - Summer (DST): UTC+2 (CEST)
- Postal code: 345 43
- Website: www.uboc.cz

Úboč is a municipality and village in Domažlice District in the Plzeň Region of the Czech Republic. It has about 200 inhabitants.

Úboč lies approximately 11 kilometres (7 mi) east of Domažlice, 41 km (25 mi) south-west of Plzeň, and 121 km (75 mi) south-west of Prague.

== Demographics ==
Historical population
| Year | Pop. | ±% |
|---|---|---|
| 1869 | 488 | — |
| 1880 | 452 | −7.4% |
| 1890 | 436 | −3.5% |
| 1900 | 399 | −8.5% |
| 1910 | 407 | +2.0% |
| 1921 | 385 | −5.4% |
| 1930 | 375 | −2.6% |
| 1950 | 215 | −42.7% |
| 1961 | 210 | −2.3% |
| 1970 | 174 | −17.1% |
| 1980 | 152 | −12.6% |
| 1991 | 132 | −13.2% |
| 2001 | 111 | −15.9% |
| 2011 | 99 | −10.8% |
| 2021 | 132 | +33.3% |
Source: Censuses
