= Hlohovčice =

- Municipality
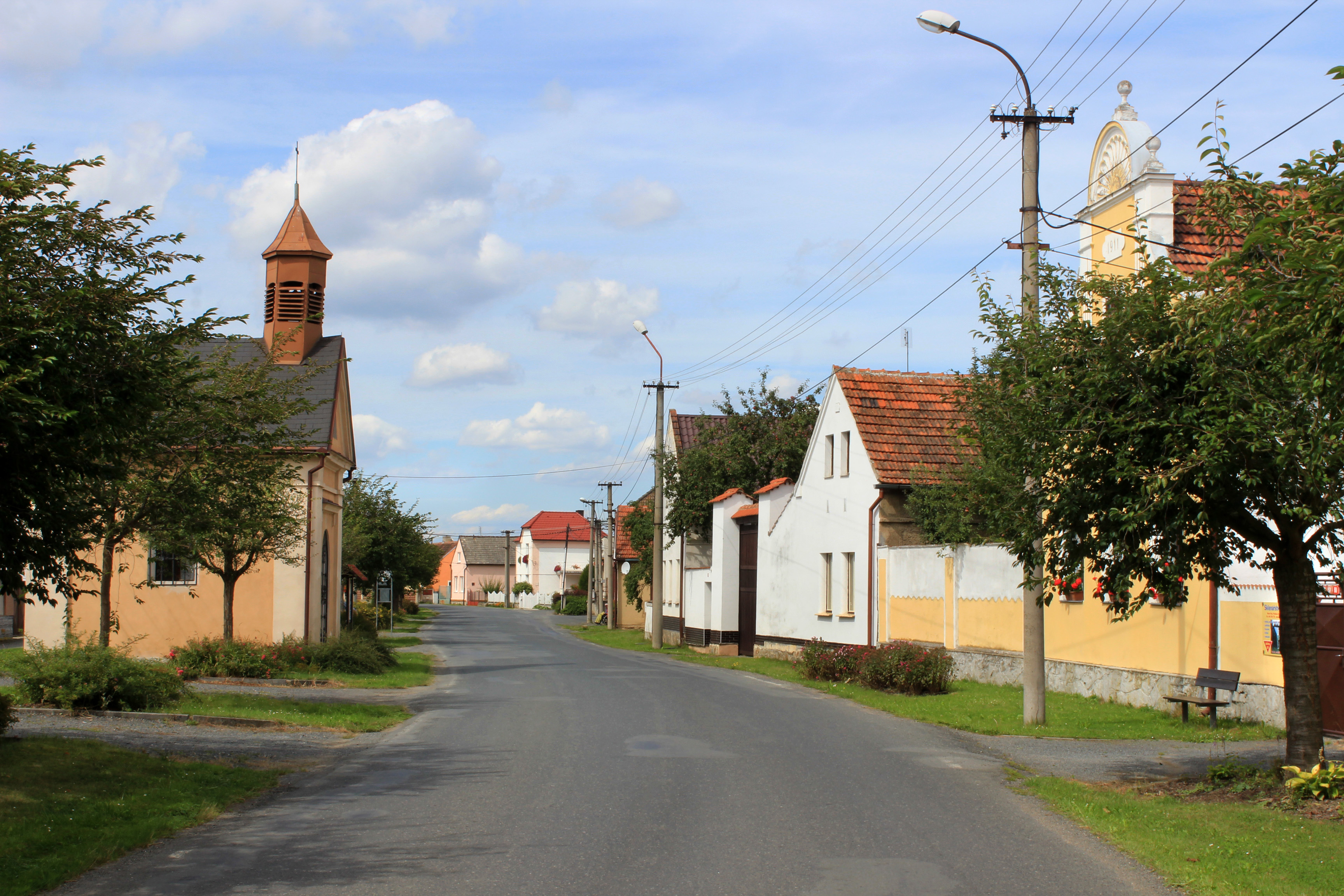
- Main street

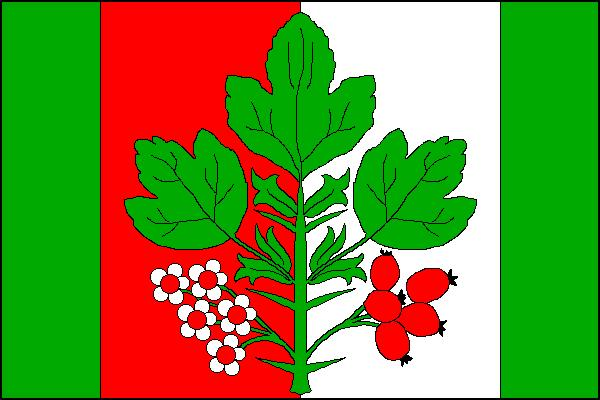
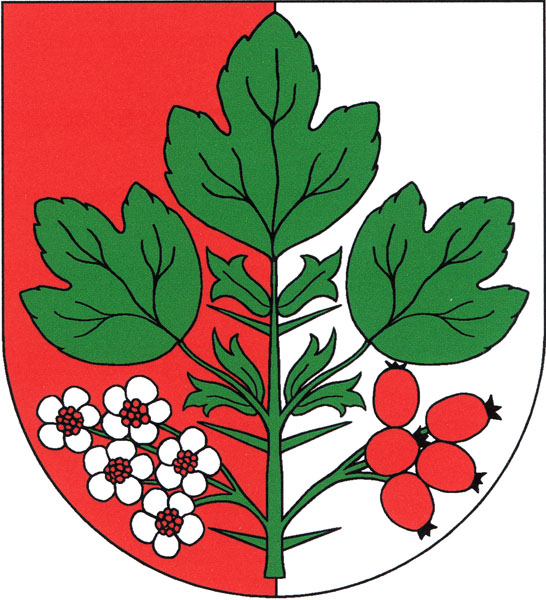
- Flag Coat of arms

- Location in the Czech Republic
- Coordinates: 49°31′15″N 13°6′50″E
- Country: Czech Republic
- Region: Plzeň
- District: Domažlice
- First mentioned: 1381

Area
  - Total: 3.32 km^{2} (1.28 sq mi)
- Elevation: 418 m (1,371 ft)

Population (2026-01-01)
  - Total: 174
  - Density: 52.4/km^{2} (136/sq mi)
- Time zone: UTC+1 (CET)
  - Summer (DST): UTC+2 (CEST)
- Postal code: 345 61
- Website: www.hlohovcice.cz

Hlohovčice is a municipality and village in Domažlice District in the Plzeň Region of the Czech Republic. It has about 200 inhabitants.

Hlohovčice lies approximately 16 kilometres (10 mi) north-east of Domažlice, 32 km (20 mi) south-west of Plzeň, and 114 km (71 mi) south-west of Prague.

== Demographics ==
Historical population
Year	Pop.	±%
1869	340	—
1880	316	−7.1%
1890	326	+3.2%
1900	325	−0.3%
1910	392	+20.6%
1921	385	−1.8%
1930	351	−8.8%
1950	282	−19.7%
1961	277	−1.8%
1970	253	−8.7%
1980	230	−9.1%
1991	205	−10.9%
2001	192	−6.3%
2011	175	−8.9%
2021	159	−9.1%
Source: Censuses
