= Brnířov =

- Municipality
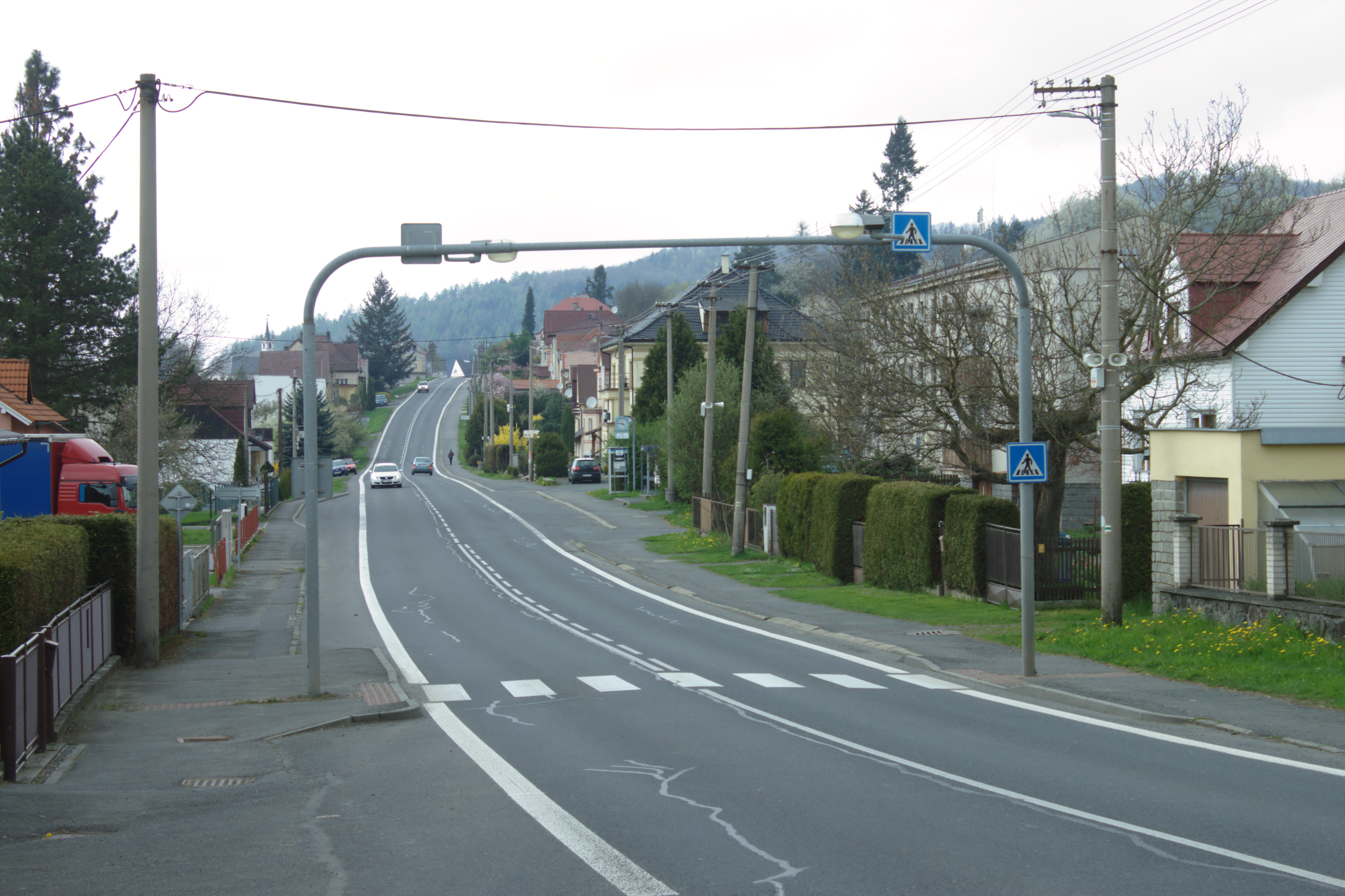
- Main road

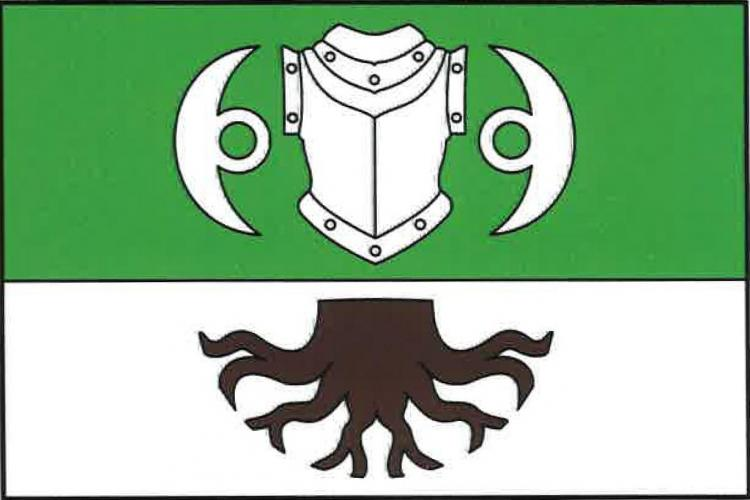
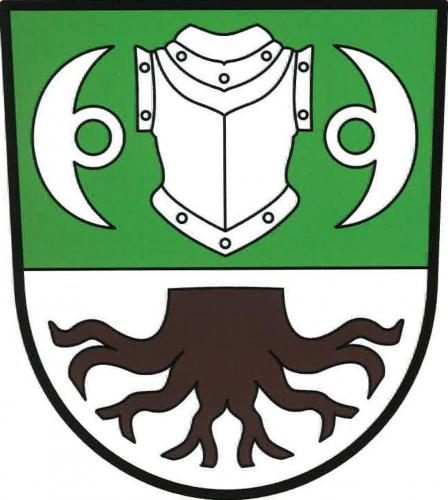
- Flag Coat of arms

- Location in the Czech Republic
- Coordinates: 49°22′58″N 13°2′59″E
- Country: Czech Republic
- Region: Plzeň
- District: Domažlice
- First mentioned: 1508

Area
  - Total: 2.71 km^{2} (1.05 sq mi)
- Elevation: 461 m (1,512 ft)

Population (2026-01-01)
  - Total: 440
  - Density: 160/km^{2} (420/sq mi)
- Time zone: UTC+1 (CET)
  - Summer (DST): UTC+2 (CEST)
- Postal code: 345 06
- Website: www.obecbrnirov.cz

Brnířov is a municipality and village in Domažlice District in the Plzeň Region of the Czech Republic. It has about 400 inhabitants.

Brnířov lies approximately 12 kilometres (7 mi) south-east of Domažlice, 48 km (30 mi) south-west of Plzeň, and 127 km (79 mi) south-west of Prague.

== Demographics ==
Historical population
Year	Pop.	±%
1869	273	—
1880	318	+16.5%
1890	312	−1.9%
1900	341	+9.3%
1910	368	+7.9%
1921	339	−7.9%
1930	352	+3.8%
1950	322	−8.5%
1961	342	+6.2%
1970	331	−3.2%
1980	322	−2.7%
1991	356	+10.6%
2001	355	−0.3%
2011	392	+10.4%
2021	408	+4.1%
Source: Censuses
