= Hlohová =

- Municipality
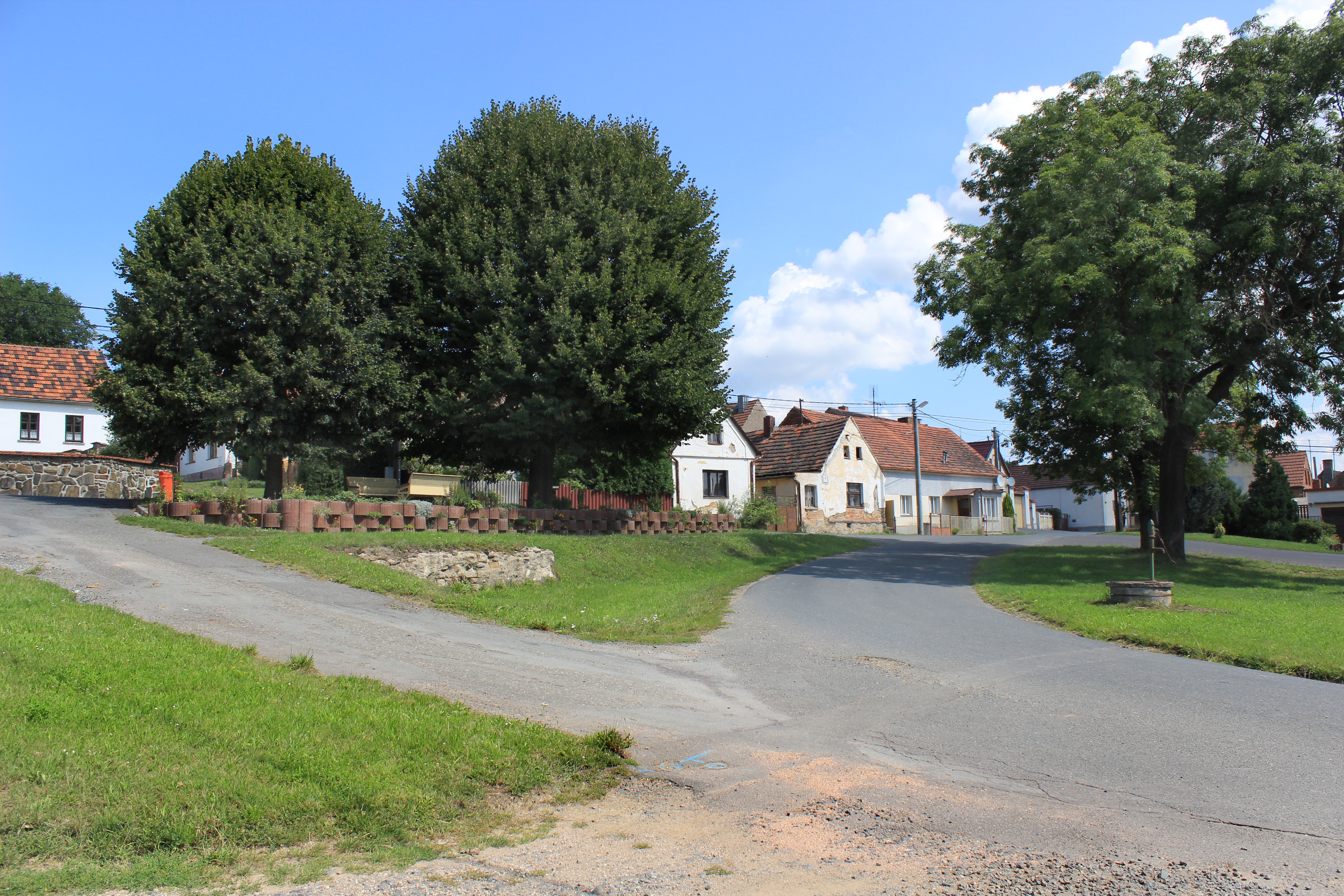
- Centre of Hlohová

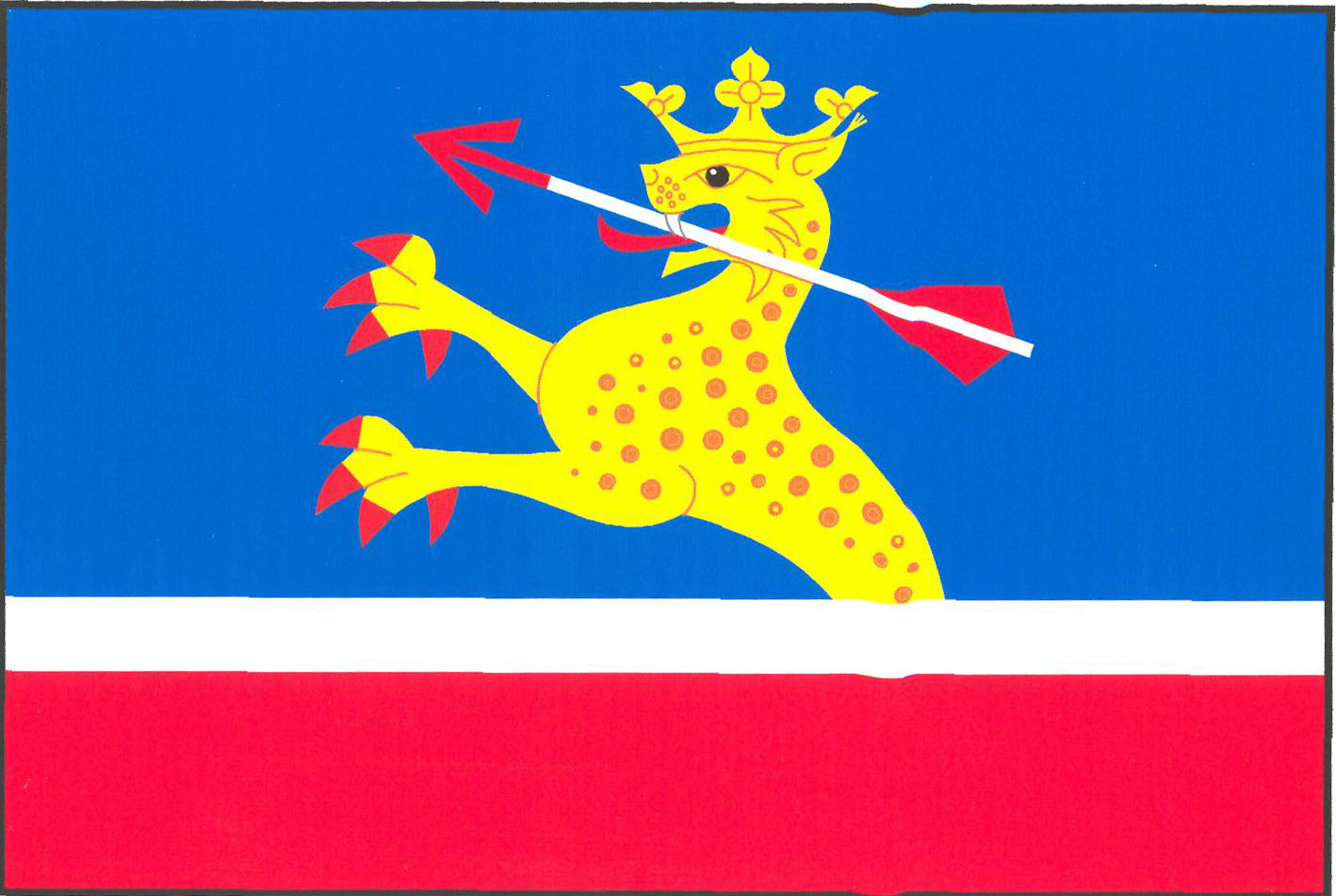
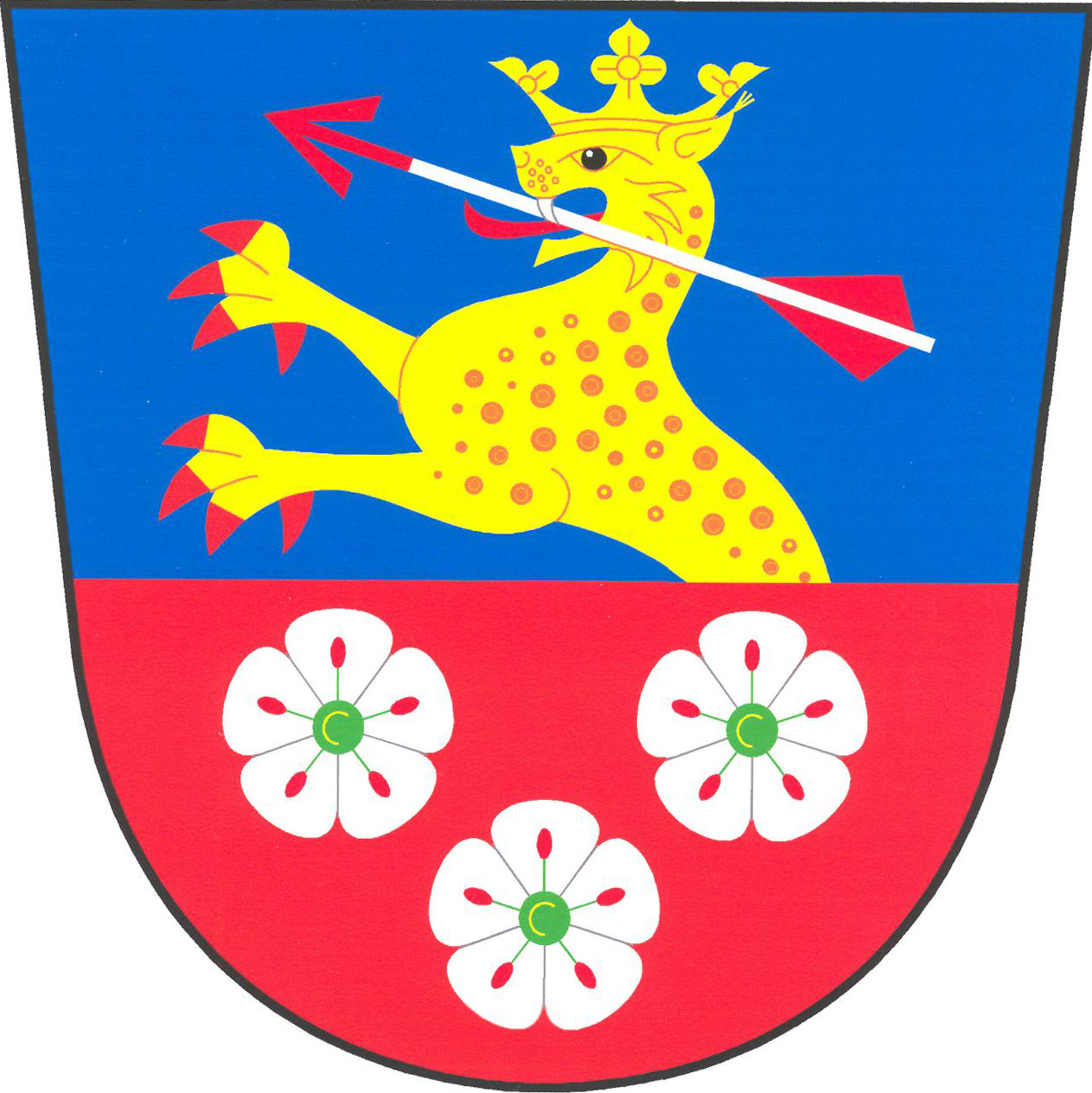
- Flag Coat of arms

- Location in the Czech Republic
- Coordinates: 49°32′3″N 13°4′29″E
- Country: Czech Republic
- Region: Plzeň
- District: Domažlice
- First mentioned: 1357

Area
  - Total: 6.66 km^{2} (2.57 sq mi)
- Elevation: 412 m (1,352 ft)

Population (2026-01-01)
  - Total: 314
  - Density: 47.1/km^{2} (122/sq mi)
- Time zone: UTC+1 (CET)
  - Summer (DST): UTC+2 (CEST)
- Postal code: 345 61
- Website: www.hlohova.cz

Hlohová is a municipality and village in Domažlice District in the Plzeň Region of the Czech Republic. It has about 300 inhabitants.

Hlohová lies approximately 15 kilometres (9 mi) north-east of Domažlice, 33 km (21 mi) south-west of Plzeň, and 115 km (71 mi) south-west of Prague.

== Demographics ==
Historical population
Year	Pop.	±%
1869	507	—
1880	504	−0.6%
1890	522	+3.6%
1900	573	+9.8%
1910	601	+4.9%
1921	648	+7.8%
1930	584	−9.9%
1950	455	−22.1%
1961	421	−7.5%
1970	377	−10.5%
1980	321	−14.9%
1991	256	−20.2%
2001	244	−4.7%
2011	233	−4.5%
2021	273	+17.2%
Source: Censuses
