= Drahotín =

- Municipality
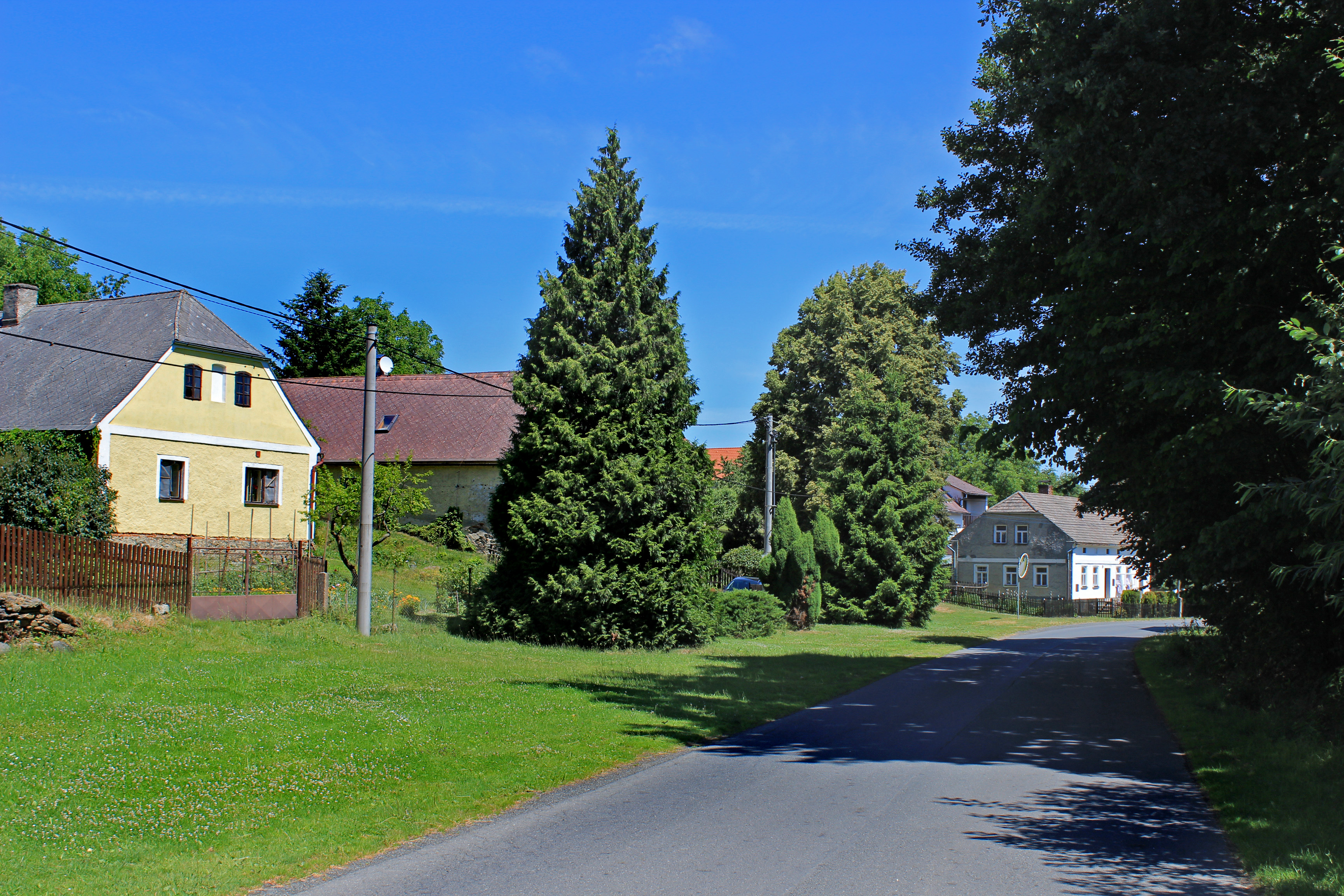
- Eastern part of Drahotín

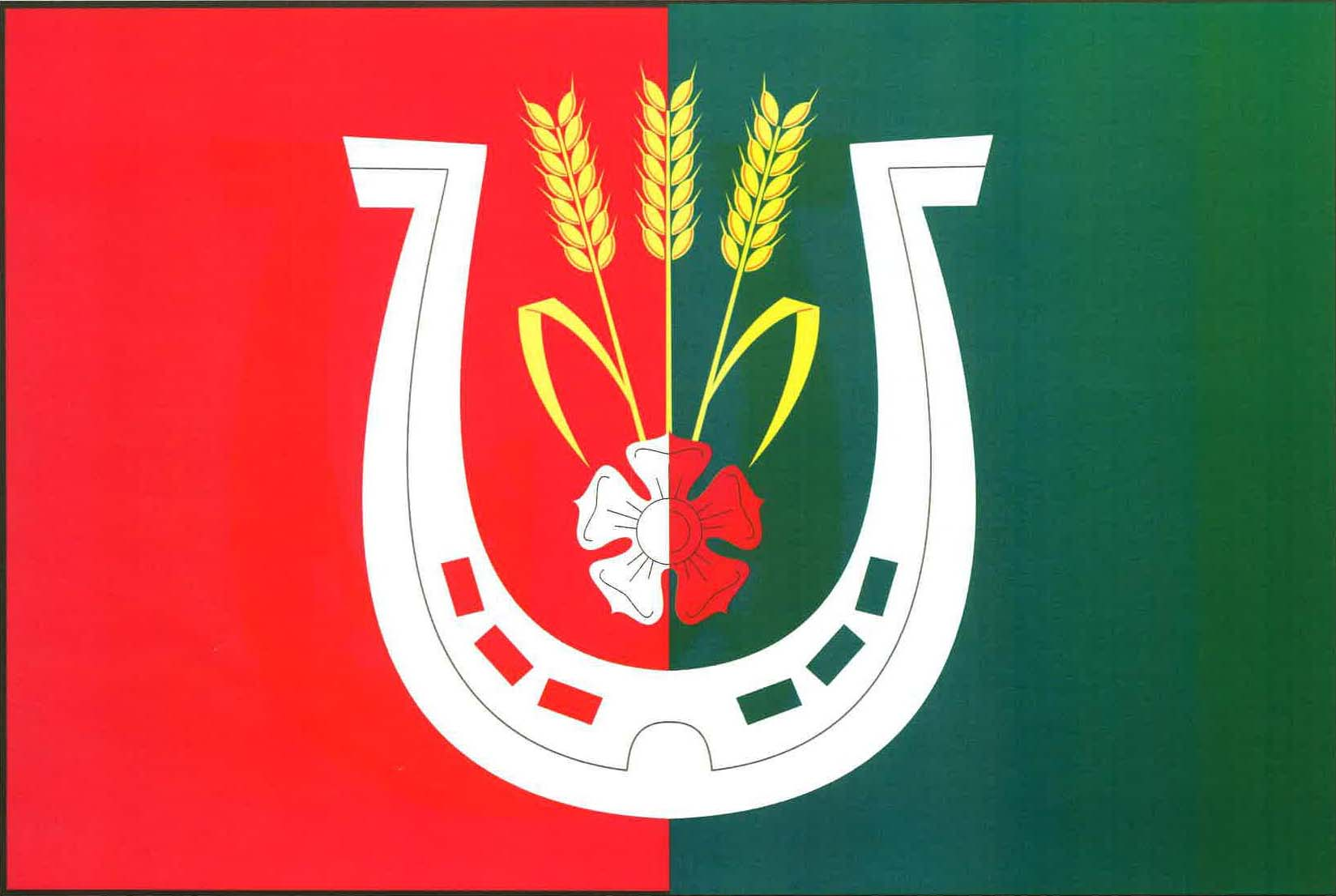
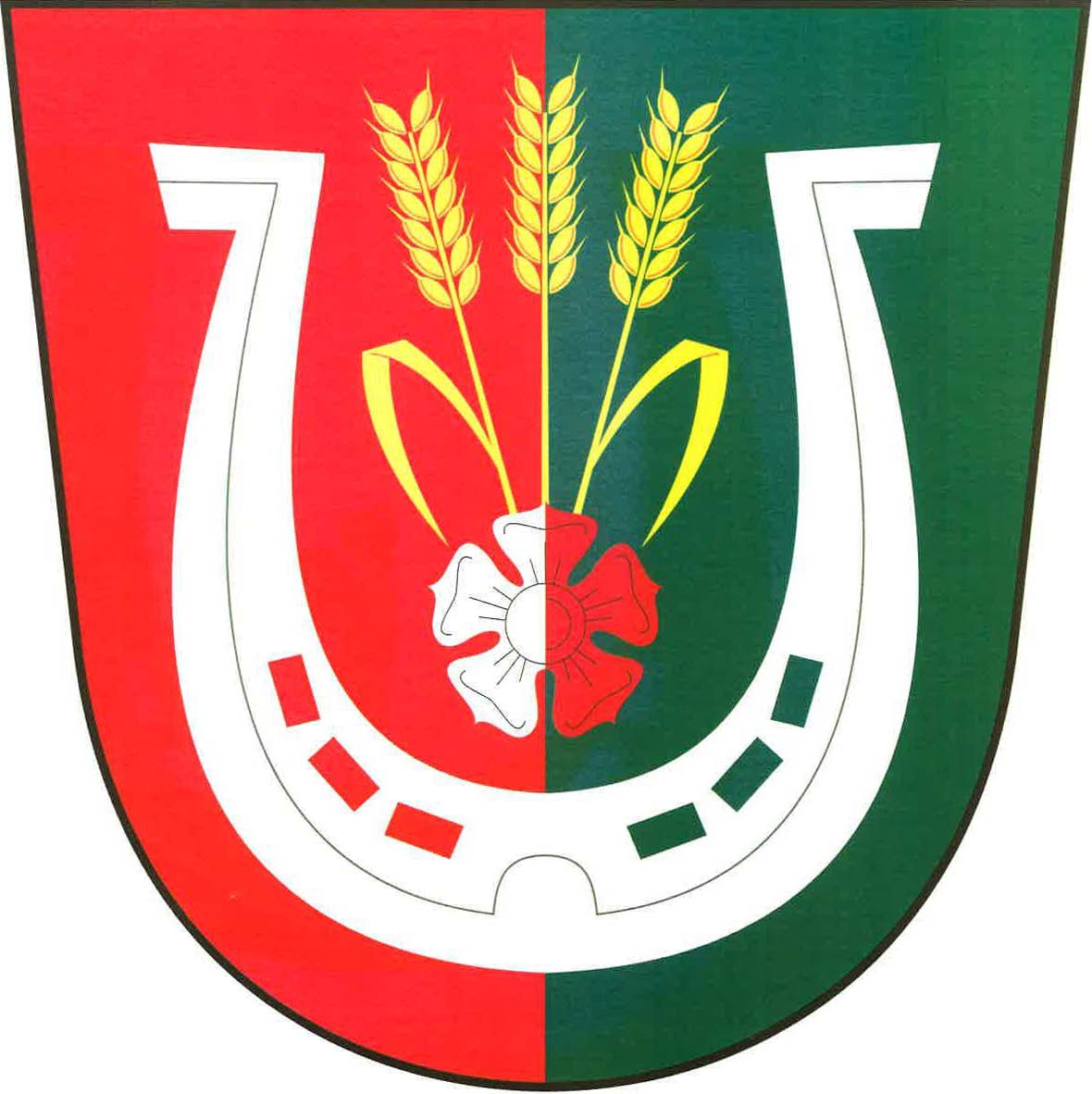
- Flag Coat of arms

- Location in the Czech Republic
- Coordinates: 49°31′27″N 12°45′29″E
- Country: Czech Republic
- Region: Plzeň
- District: Domažlice
- First mentioned: 1365

Area
  - Total: 8.92 km^{2} (3.44 sq mi)
- Elevation: 485 m (1,591 ft)

Population (2026-01-01)
  - Total: 195
  - Density: 21.9/km^{2} (56.6/sq mi)
- Time zone: UTC+1 (CET)
  - Summer (DST): UTC+2 (CEST)
- Postal code: 345 22
- Website: www.drahotin.cz

Drahotín is a municipality and village in Domažlice District in the Plzeň Region of the Czech Republic. It has about 200 inhabitants.

Drahotín lies approximately 16 kilometres (10 mi) north-west of Domažlice, 51 km (32 mi) south-west of Plzeň, and 135 km (84 mi) south-west of Prague.

== Demographics ==
Historical population
| Year | Pop. | ±% |
|---|---|---|
| 1869 | 445 | — |
| 1880 | 487 | +9.4% |
| 1890 | 448 | −8.0% |
| 1900 | 474 | +5.8% |
| 1910 | 517 | +9.1% |
| 1921 | 467 | −9.7% |
| 1930 | 452 | −3.2% |
| 1950 | 209 | −53.8% |
| 1961 | 188 | −10.0% |
| 1970 | 199 | +5.9% |
| 1980 | 204 | +2.5% |
| 1991 | 186 | −8.8% |
| 2001 | 182 | −2.2% |
| 2011 | 161 | −11.5% |
| 2021 | 184 | +14.3% |
Source: Censuses
