= Úsilov =

- Municipality
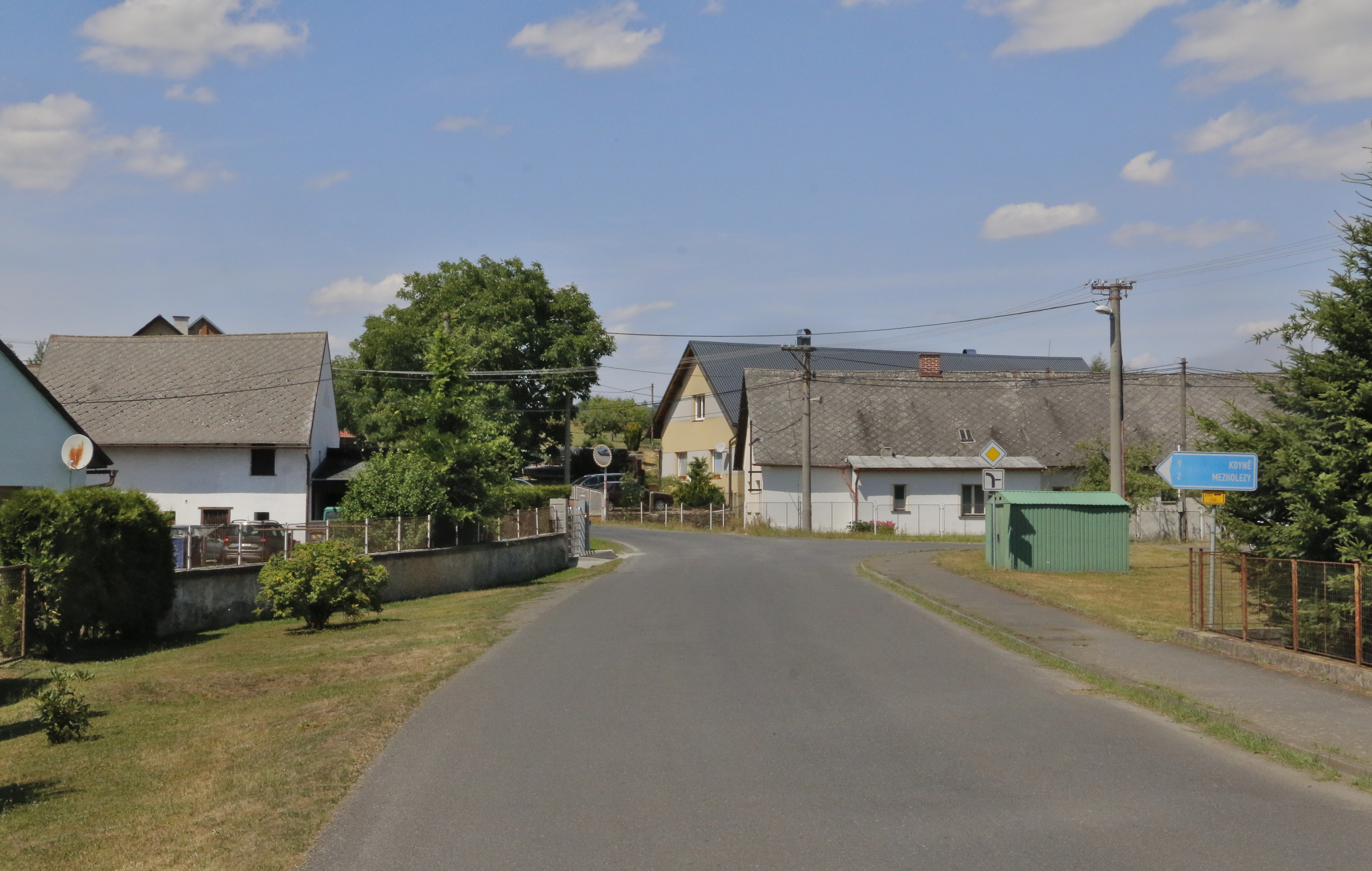
- Northern part of Úsilov

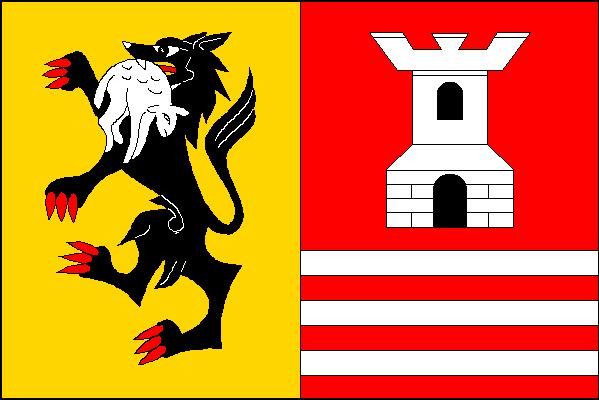
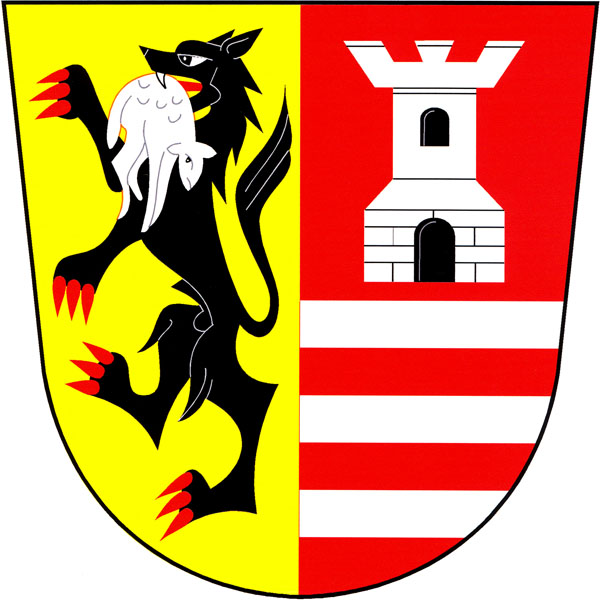
- Flag Coat of arms

- Location in the Czech Republic
- Coordinates: 49°23′49″N 13°7′37″E
- Country: Czech Republic
- Region: Plzeň
- District: Domažlice
- First mentioned: 1379

Area
  - Total: 8.14 km^{2} (3.14 sq mi)
- Elevation: 467 m (1,532 ft)

Population (2026-01-01)
  - Total: 130
  - Density: 16/km^{2} (41/sq mi)
- Time zone: UTC+1 (CET)
  - Summer (DST): UTC+2 (CEST)
- Postal code: 345 06
- Website: usilov.cz

Úsilov is a municipality and village in Domažlice District in the Plzeň Region of the Czech Republic. It has about 100 inhabitants.

Úsilov lies approximately 14 kilometres (9 mi) east of Domažlice, 44 km (27 mi) south-west of Plzeň, and 122 km (76 mi) south-west of Prague.

== Demographics ==
Historical population
| Year | Pop. | ±% |
|---|---|---|
| 1869 | 305 | — |
| 1880 | 321 | +5.2% |
| 1890 | 295 | −8.1% |
| 1900 | 265 | −10.2% |
| 1910 | 263 | −0.8% |
| 1921 | 255 | −3.0% |
| 1930 | 209 | −18.0% |
| 1950 | 153 | −26.8% |
| 1961 | 154 | +0.7% |
| 1970 | 138 | −10.4% |
| 1980 | 122 | −11.6% |
| 1991 | 133 | +9.0% |
| 2001 | 149 | +12.0% |
| 2011 | 128 | −14.1% |
| 2021 | 126 | −1.6% |
Source: Censuses
