= Pařezov =

- Municipality
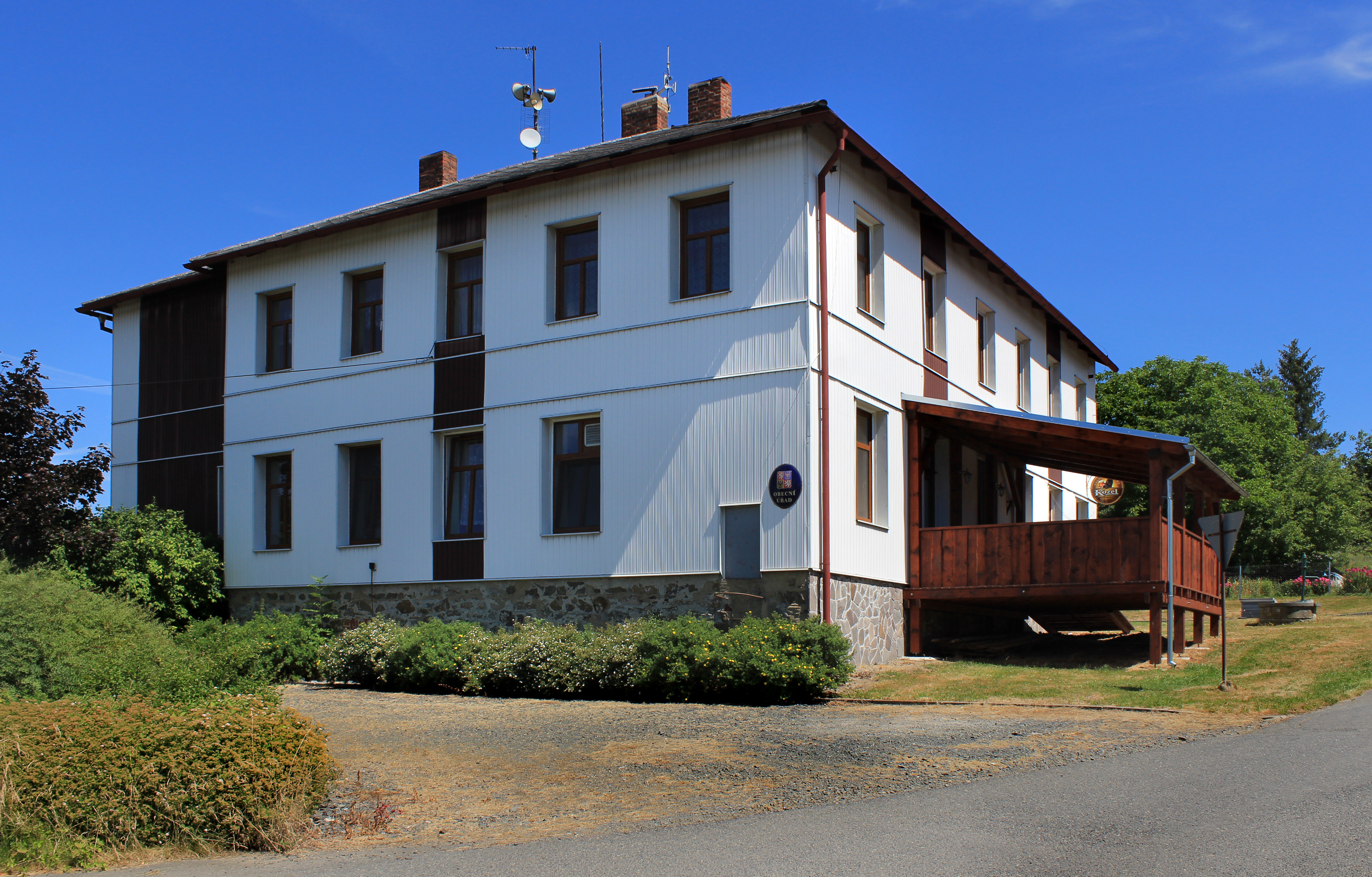
- Municipal office

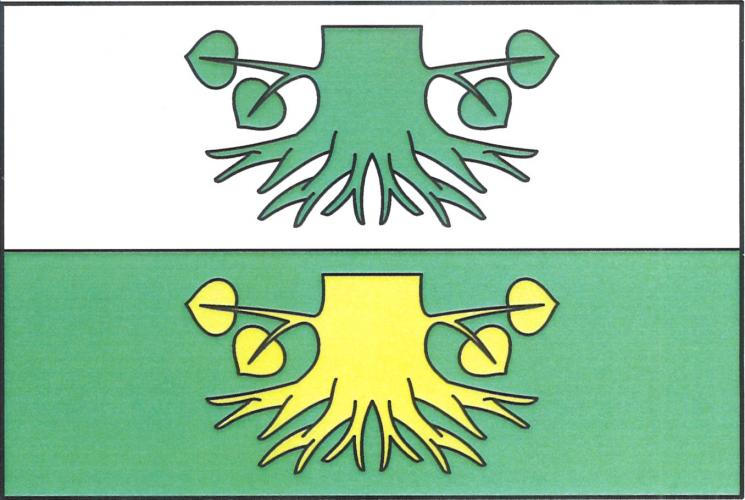
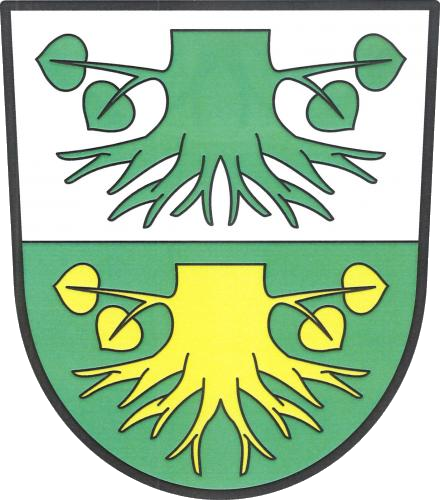
- Flag Coat of arms

- Location in the Czech Republic
- Coordinates: 49°28′10″N 12°50′21″E
- Country: Czech Republic
- Region: Plzeň
- District: Domažlice
- First mentioned: 1537

Area
  - Total: 1.59 km^{2} (0.61 sq mi)
- Elevation: 420 m (1,380 ft)

Population (2026-01-01)
  - Total: 228
  - Density: 143/km^{2} (371/sq mi)
- Time zone: UTC+1 (CET)
  - Summer (DST): UTC+2 (CEST)
- Postal code: 344 01
- Website: www.parezov.cz

Pařezov is a municipality in Domažlice District in the Plzeň Region of the Czech Republic. It has about 200 inhabitants.

Pařezov lies approximately 8 kilometres (5 mi) north-west of Domažlice, 50 km (31 mi) south-west of Plzeň, and 133 km (83 mi) south-west of Prague.

== Administrative division ==
Pařezov consists of two municipal parts (in brackets population according to the 2021 census):

- Nový Pařezov (136)
- Starý Pařezov (75)

== Demographics ==
Historical population
Year	Pop.	±%
1869	336	—
1880	368	+9.5%
1890	357	−3.0%
1900	359	+0.6%
1910	380	+5.8%
1921	353	−7.1%
1930	353	+0.0%
1950	162	−54.1%
1961	153	−5.6%
1970	137	−10.5%
1980	109	−20.4%
1991	95	−12.8%
2001	111	+16.8%
2011	144	+29.7%
2021	211	+46.5%
Source: Censuses
