= Kaničky =

- Municipality
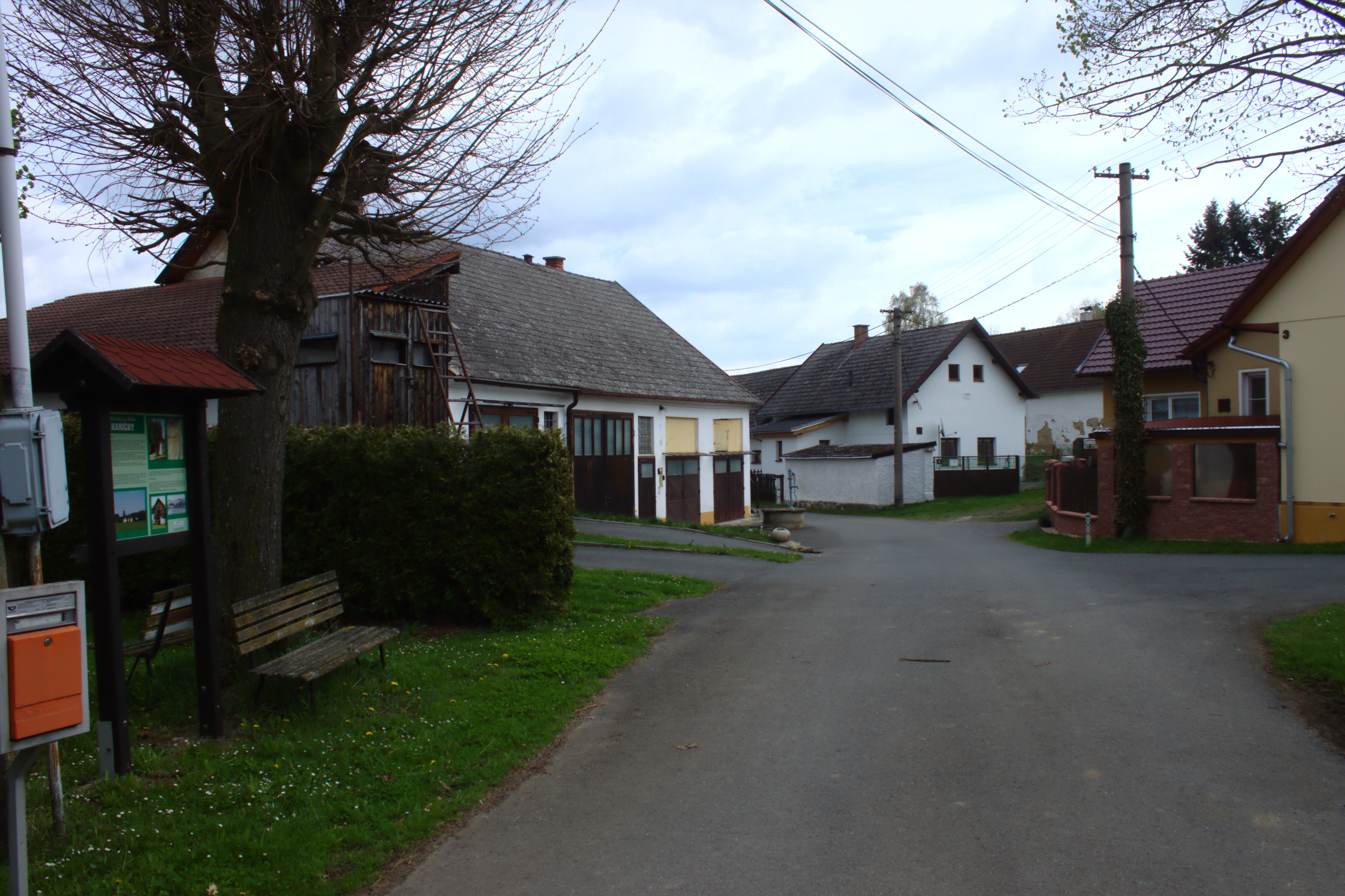
- Centre of Kaničky

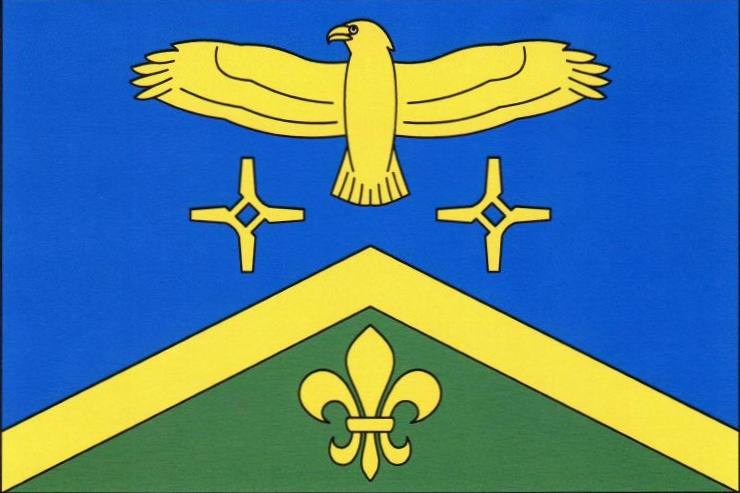
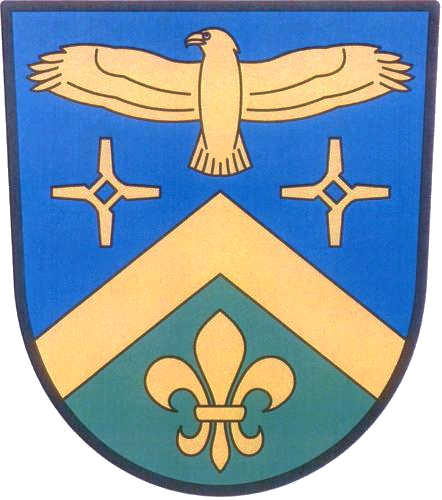
- Flag Coat of arms

- Location in the Czech Republic
- Coordinates: 49°28′29″N 13°8′44″E
- Country: Czech Republic
- Region: Plzeň
- District: Domažlice
- First mentioned: 1379

Area
  - Total: 1.50 km^{2} (0.58 sq mi)
- Elevation: 446 m (1,463 ft)

Population (2026-01-01)
  - Total: 31
  - Density: 21/km^{2} (54/sq mi)
- Time zone: UTC+1 (CET)
  - Summer (DST): UTC+2 (CEST)
- Postal code: 345 43
- Website: www.kanicky.cz

Kaničky is a municipality and village in Domažlice District in the Plzeň Region of the Czech Republic. It has about 30 inhabitants.

Kaničky lies approximately 17 kilometres (11 mi) east of Domažlice, 35 km (22 mi) south-west of Plzeň, and 114 km (71 mi) south-west of Prague.

== Demographics ==
Historical population
Year	Pop.	±%
1869	85	—
1880	83	−2.4%
1890	79	−4.8%
1900	69	−12.7%
1910	91	+31.9%
1921	95	+4.4%
1930	75	−21.1%
1950	68	−9.3%
1961	60	−11.8%
1970	50	−16.7%
1980	57	+14.0%
1991	46	−19.3%
2001	36	−21.7%
2011	32	−11.1%
2021	28	−12.5%
Source: Censuses
