= Chrastavice =

- Municipality
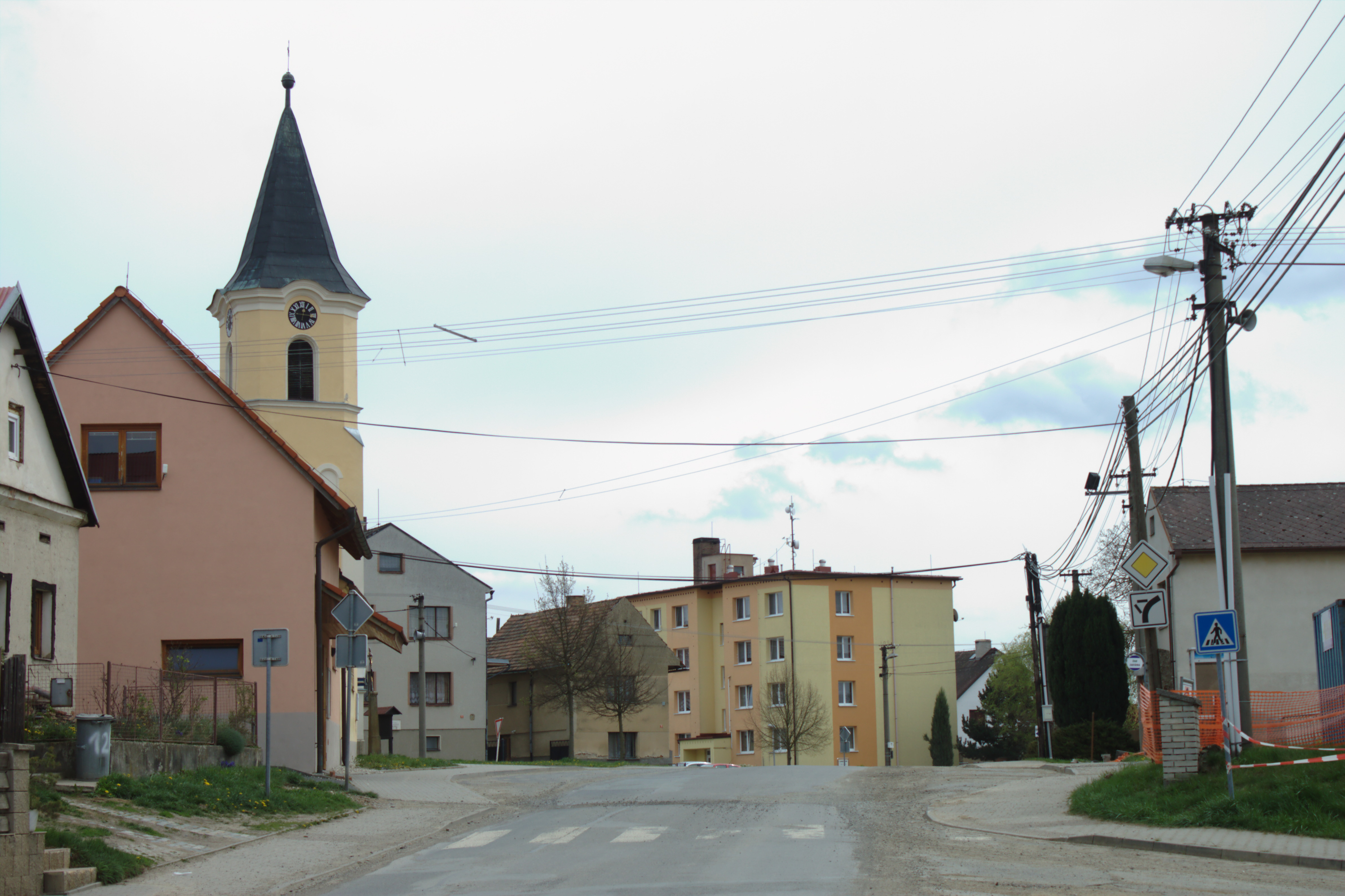
- Main road

- Flag Coat of arms

- Location in the Czech Republic
- Coordinates: 49°27′13″N 12°57′25″E
- Country: Czech Republic
- Region: Plzeň
- District: Domažlice
- First mentioned: 1324

Area
  - Total: 8.72 km^{2} (3.37 sq mi)
- Elevation: 448 m (1,470 ft)

Population (2026-01-01)
  - Total: 362
  - Density: 41.5/km^{2} (108/sq mi)
- Time zone: UTC+1 (CET)
  - Summer (DST): UTC+2 (CEST)
- Postal code: 344 01
- Website: www.chrastavice.cz

Chrastavice is a municipality and village in Domažlice District in the Plzeň Region of the Czech Republic. It has about 400 inhabitants.

Chrastavice lies approximately 4 kilometres (2 mi) north-east of Domažlice, 44 km (27 mi) south-west of Plzeň, and 126 km (78 mi) south-west of Prague.

== Demographics ==
Historical population
Year	Pop.	±%
1869	326	—
1880	383	+17.5%
1890	358	−6.5%
1900	381	+6.4%
1910	444	+16.5%
1921	473	+6.5%
1930	396	−16.3%
1950	313	−21.0%
1961	327	+4.5%
1970	267	−18.3%
1980	254	−4.9%
1991	291	+14.6%
2001	326	+12.0%
2011	357	+9.5%
2021	382	+7.0%
Source: Censuses
