= Tlumačov (Domažlice District) =

- Municipality
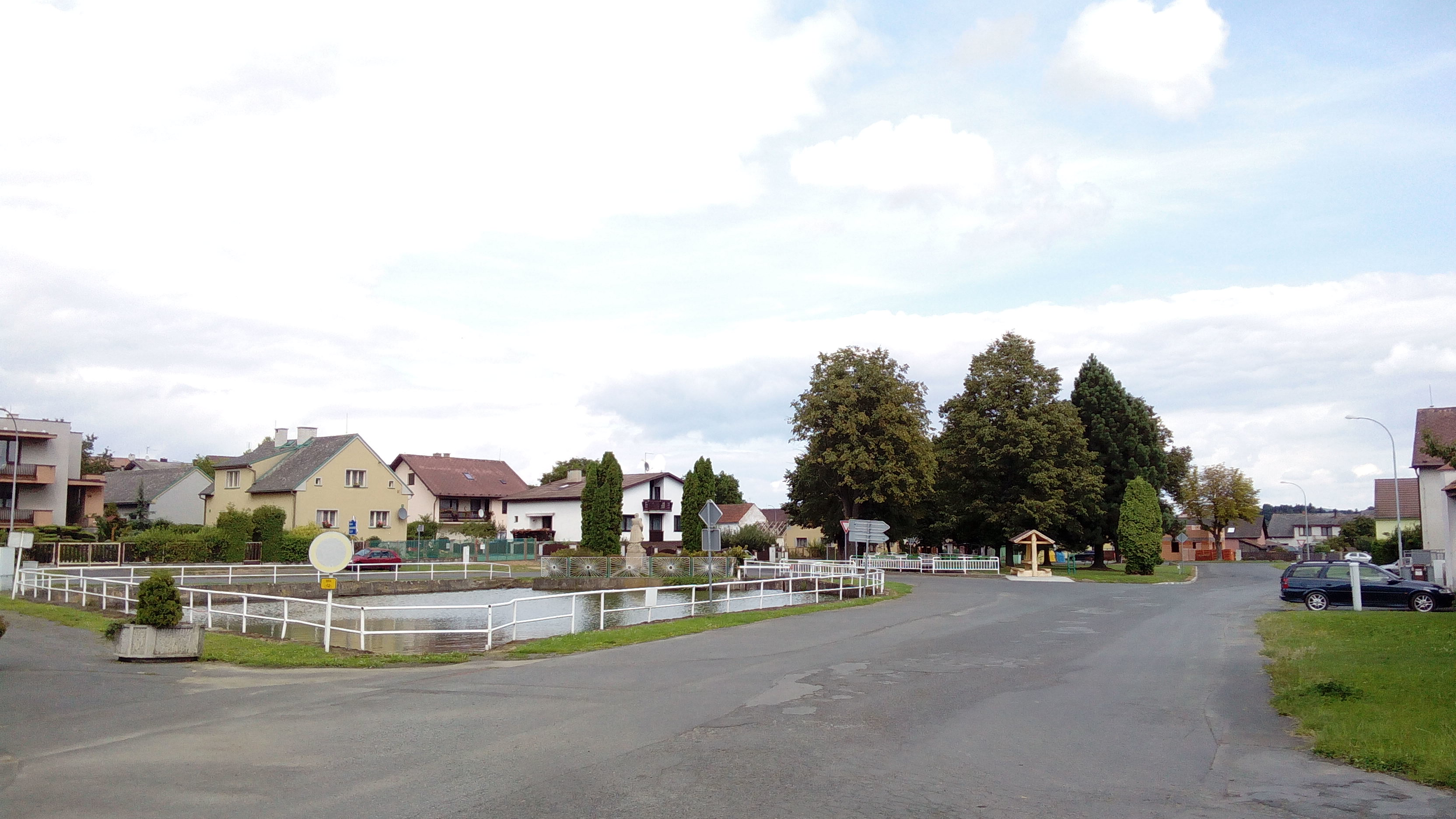
- Centre of Tlumačov

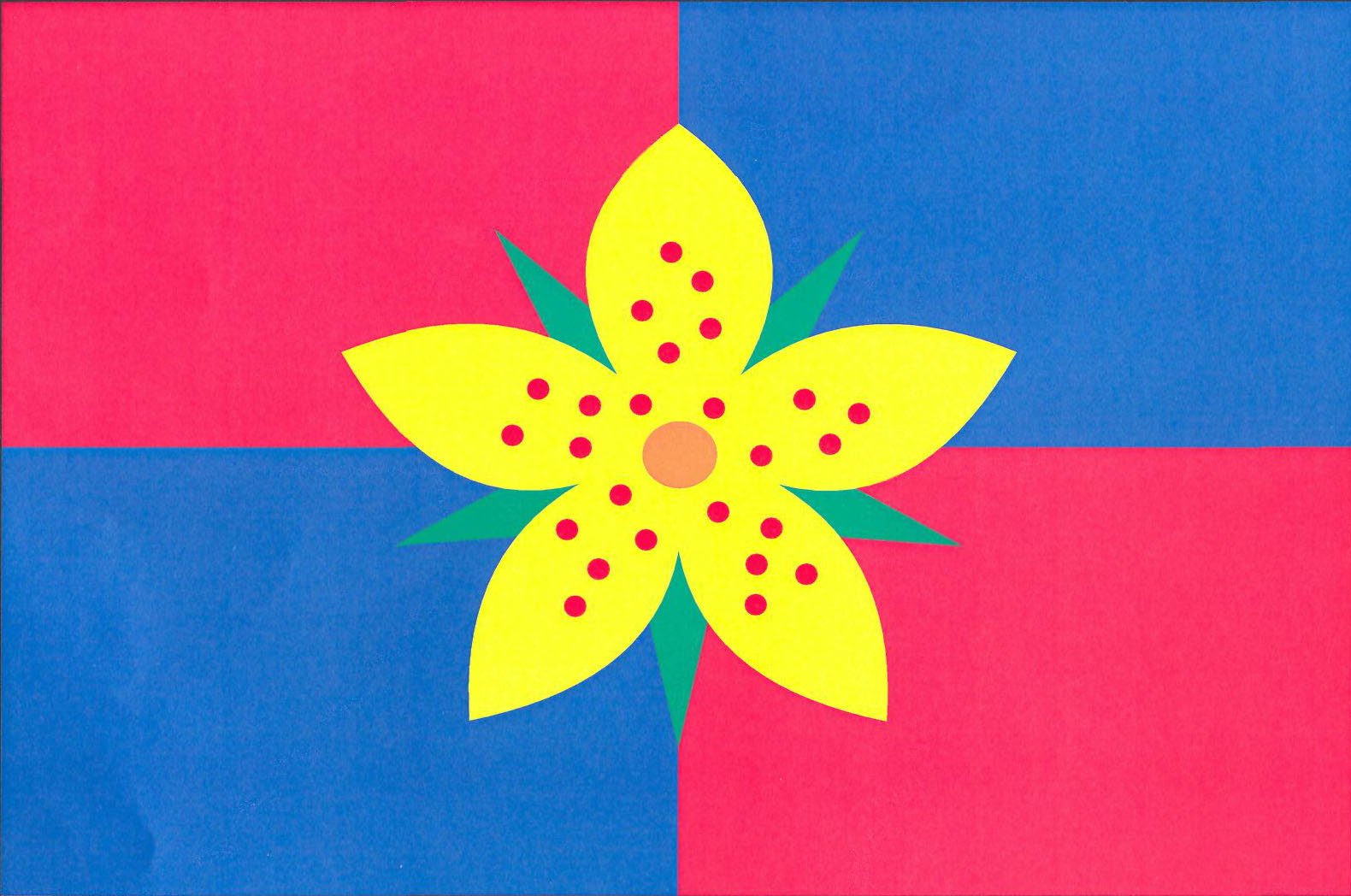
- Flag Coat of arms

- Location in the Czech Republic
- Coordinates: 49°24′13″N 12°55′44″E
- Country: Czech Republic
- Region: Plzeň
- District: Domažlice
- First mentioned: 1325

Area
  - Total: 11.87 km^{2} (4.58 sq mi)
- Elevation: 460 m (1,510 ft)

Population (2026-01-01)
  - Total: 404
  - Density: 34.0/km^{2} (88.2/sq mi)
- Time zone: UTC+1 (CET)
  - Summer (DST): UTC+2 (CEST)
- Postal code: 344 01
- Website: obectlumacov.cz

Tlumačov is a municipality and village in Domažlice District in the Plzeň Region of the Czech Republic. It has about 400 inhabitants.

Tlumačov lies approximately 5 kilometres (3 mi) south of Domažlice, 51 km (32 mi) south-west of Plzeň, and 132 km (82 mi) south-west of Prague.

== Administrative division ==
Tlumačov consists of two municipal parts (in brackets population according to the 2021 census):

- Tlumačov (377)
- Filipova Hora (49)

== Demographics ==
Historical population
Year	Pop.	±%
1869	695	—
1880	793	+14.1%
1890	760	−4.2%
1900	746	−1.8%
1910	765	+2.5%
1921	730	−4.6%
1930	722	−1.1%
1950	553	−23.4%
1961	592	+7.1%
1970	534	−9.8%
1980	473	−11.4%
1991	437	−7.6%
2001	406	−7.1%
2011	420	+3.4%
2021	426	+1.4%
Source: Censuses
