= Chocomyšl =

- Municipality
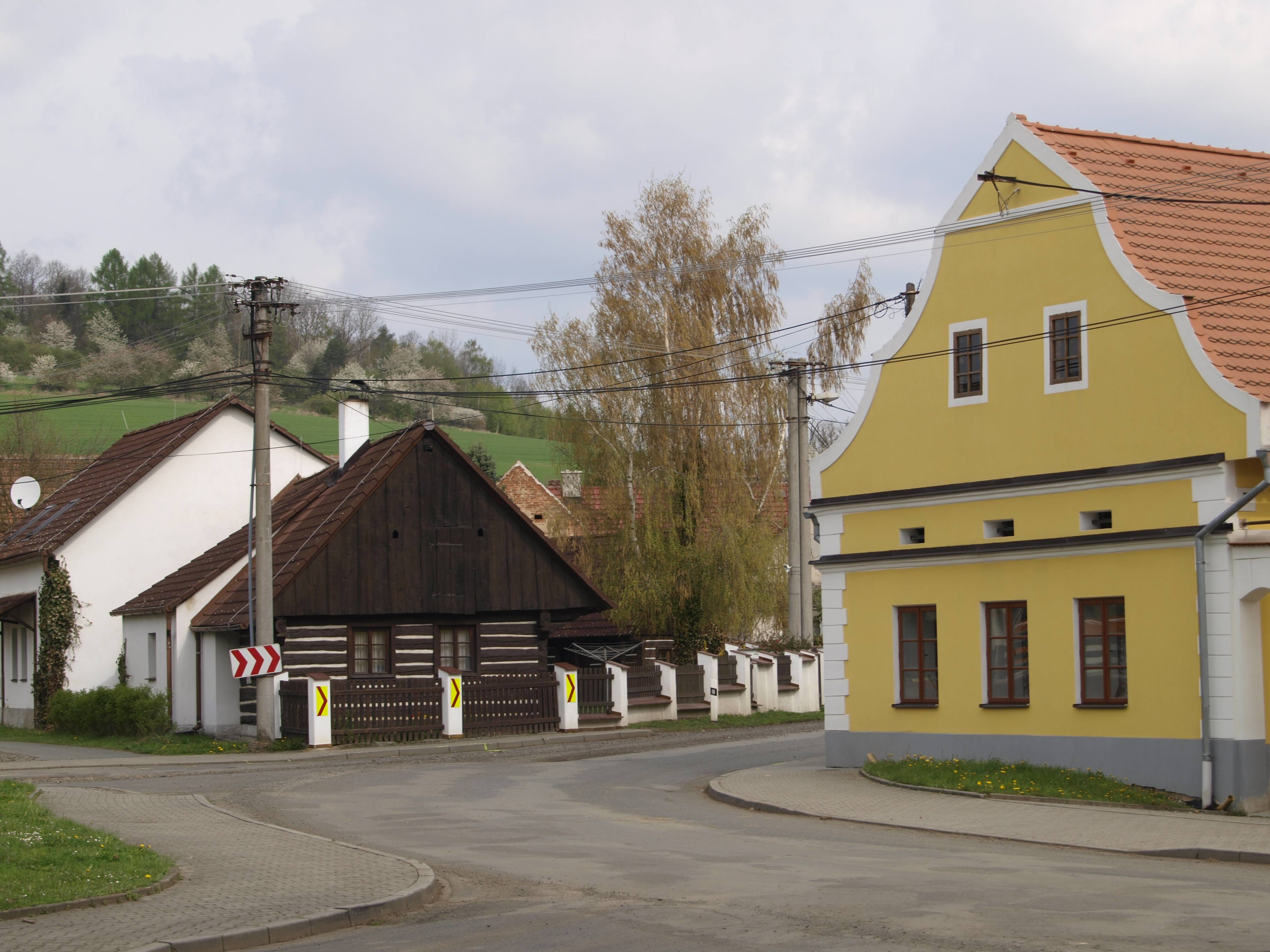
- Centre of Chocomyšl

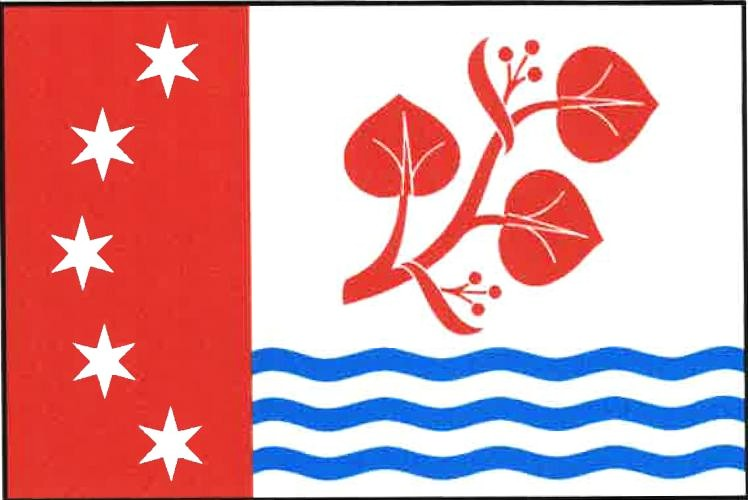
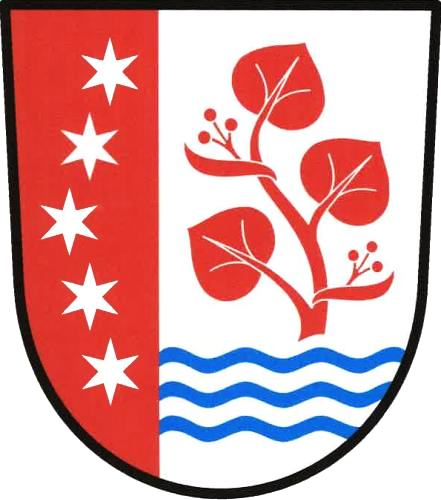
- Flag Coat of arms

- Location in the Czech Republic
- Coordinates: 49°28′2″N 13°7′51″E
- Country: Czech Republic
- Region: Plzeň
- District: Domažlice
- First mentioned: 1365

Area
  - Total: 4.18 km^{2} (1.61 sq mi)
- Elevation: 448 m (1,470 ft)

Population (2026-01-01)
  - Total: 114
  - Density: 27.3/km^{2} (70.6/sq mi)
- Time zone: UTC+1 (CET)
  - Summer (DST): UTC+2 (CEST)
- Postal code: 345 43
- Website: www.chocomysl.cz

Chocomyšl is a municipality and village in Domažlice District in the Plzeň Region of the Czech Republic. It has about 100 inhabitants.

Chocomyšl lies approximately 16 kilometres (10 mi) east of Domažlice, 36 km (22 mi) south-west of Plzeň, and 116 km (72 mi) south-west of Prague.

== Demographics ==
Historical population
Year	Pop.	±%
1869	237	—
1880	244	+3.0%
1890	250	+2.5%
1900	223	−10.8%
1910	239	+7.2%
1921	230	−3.8%
1930	207	−10.0%
1950	156	−24.6%
1961	162	+3.8%
1970	146	−9.9%
1980	180	+23.3%
1991	182	+1.1%
2001	166	−8.8%
2011	112	−32.5%
2021	113	+0.9%
Source: Censuses
