= Všepadly =

- Municipality
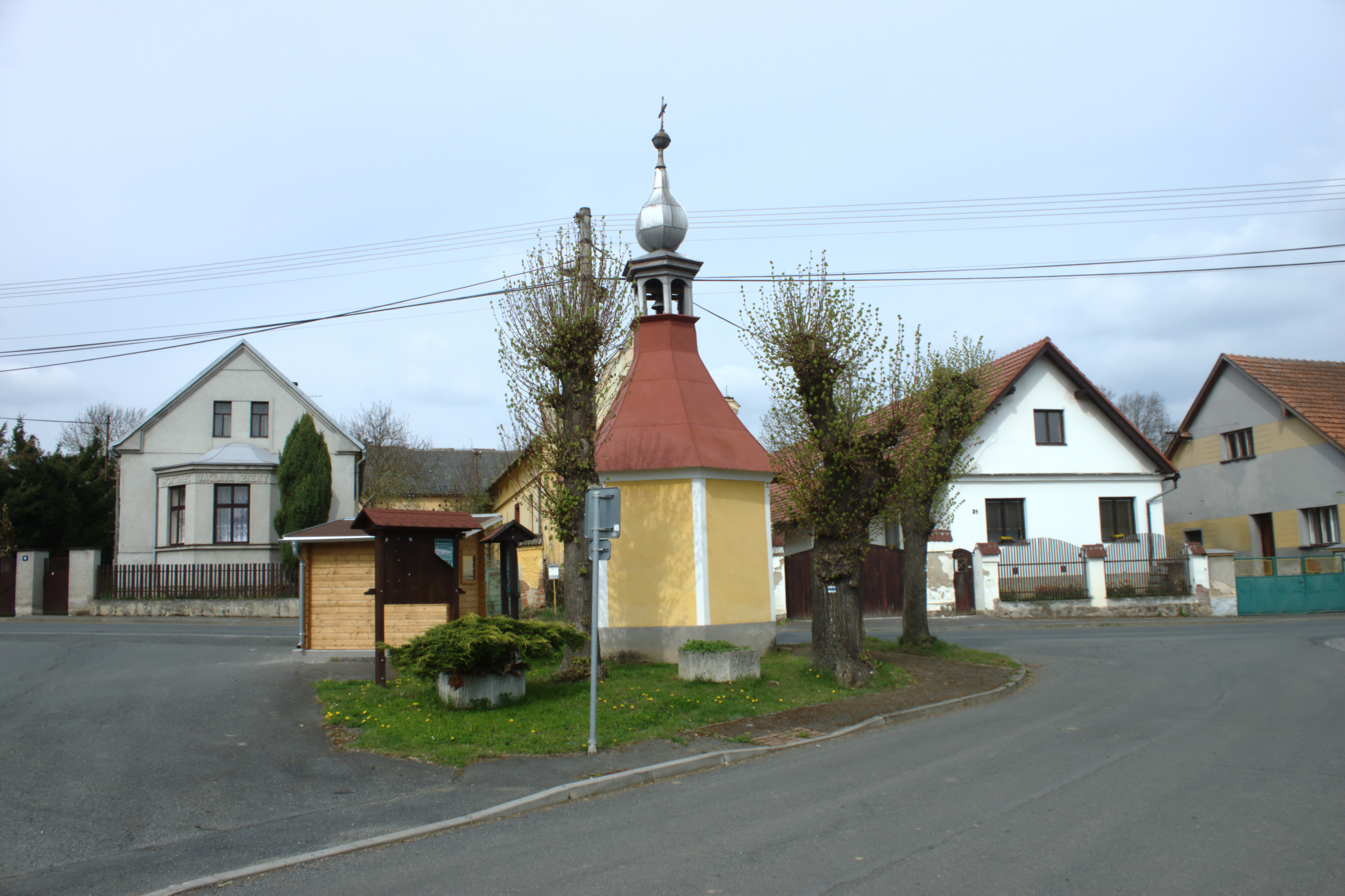
- Centre of Všepadly

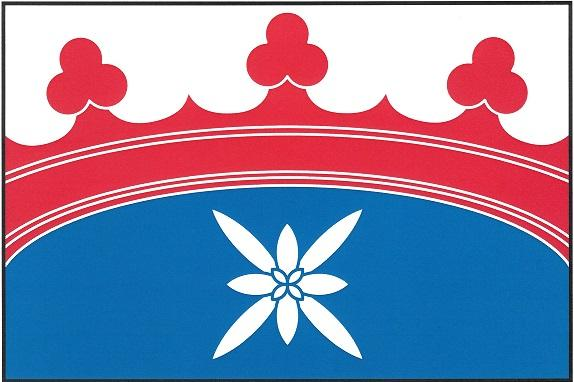
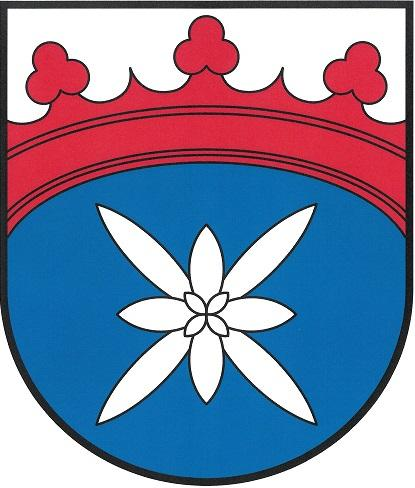
- Flag Coat of arms

- Location in the Czech Republic
- Coordinates: 49°27′4″N 13°6′19″E
- Country: Czech Republic
- Region: Plzeň
- District: Domažlice
- First mentioned: 1379

Area
  - Total: 4.92 km^{2} (1.90 sq mi)
- Elevation: 468 m (1,535 ft)

Population (2026-01-01)
  - Total: 46
  - Density: 9.3/km^{2} (24/sq mi)
- Time zone: UTC+1 (CET)
  - Summer (DST): UTC+2 (CEST)
- Postal code: 345 43
- Website: www.vsepadly.cz

Všepadly (German: Schepadl) is a municipality and village in Domažlice District in the Plzeň Region of the Czech Republic. It has about 50 inhabitants.

Všepadly lies approximately 14 kilometres (9 mi) east of Domažlice, 39 km (24 mi) south-west of Plzeň, and 118 km (73 mi) south-west of Prague.

== History ==
The first written mention of Všepadly is from 1379.

== Demographics ==
Historical population
Year	Pop.	±%
1869	357	—
1880	378	+5.9%
1890	331	−12.4%
1900	313	−5.4%
1910	308	−1.6%
1921	278	−9.7%
1930	280	+0.7%
1950	208	−25.7%
1961	174	−16.3%
1970	133	−23.6%
1980	104	−21.8%
1991	87	−16.3%
2001	69	−20.7%
2011	40	−42.0%
2021	45	+12.5%
Source: Censuses
