= Pasečnice =

- Municipality
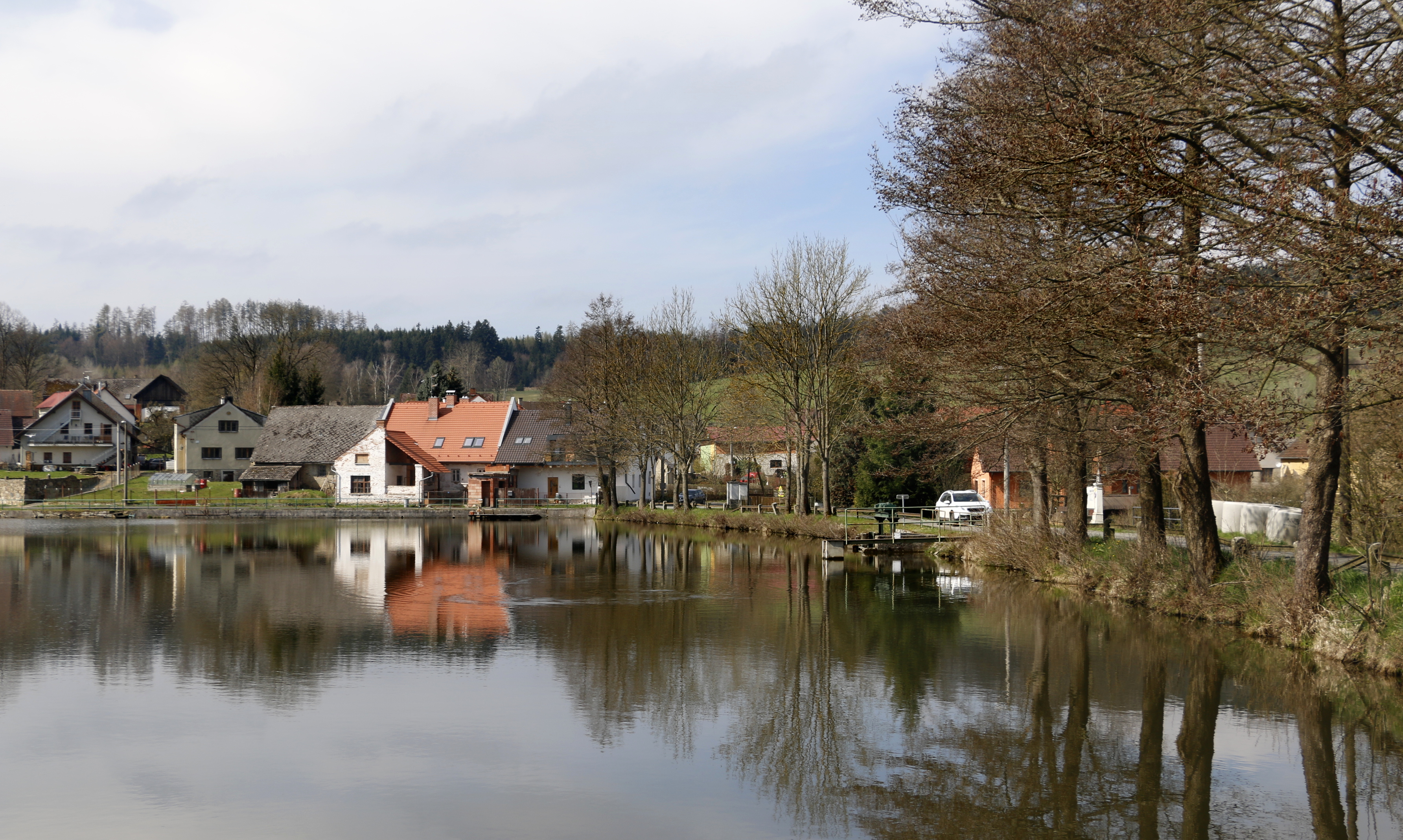
- Nová Pasečnice, a part of Pasečnice

- Location in the Czech Republic
- Coordinates: 49°23′39″N 12°53′43″E
- Country: Czech Republic
- Region: Plzeň
- District: Domažlice
- First mentioned: 1393

Area
  - Total: 7.75 km^{2} (2.99 sq mi)
- Elevation: 515 m (1,690 ft)

Population (2026-01-01)
  - Total: 195
  - Density: 25.2/km^{2} (65.2/sq mi)
- Time zone: UTC+1 (CET)
  - Summer (DST): UTC+2 (CEST)
- Postal code: 344 01
- Website: www.pasecnice.cz

Pasečnice is a municipality in Domažlice District in the Plzeň Region of the Czech Republic. It has about 200 inhabitants.

Pasečnice lies approximately 6 kilometres (4 mi) south-west of Domažlice, 53 km (33 mi) south-west of Plzeň, and 135 km (84 mi) south-west of Prague.

== Administrative division ==
Pasečnice consists of two municipal parts (in brackets population according to the 2021 census):

- Nová Pasečnice (95)
- Stará Pasečnice (122)

== Demographics ==
Historical population
Year	Pop.	±%
1869	663	—
1880	616	−7.1%
1890	623	+1.1%
1900	623	+0.0%
1910	579	−7.1%
1921	555	−4.1%
1930	521	−6.1%
1950	313	−39.9%
1961	294	−6.1%
1970	258	−12.2%
1980	208	−19.4%
1991	197	−5.3%
2001	205	+4.1%
2011	183	−10.7%
2021	217	+18.6%
Source: Censuses
