= Domažlice District =

Domažlice District Okres Domažlice
- District
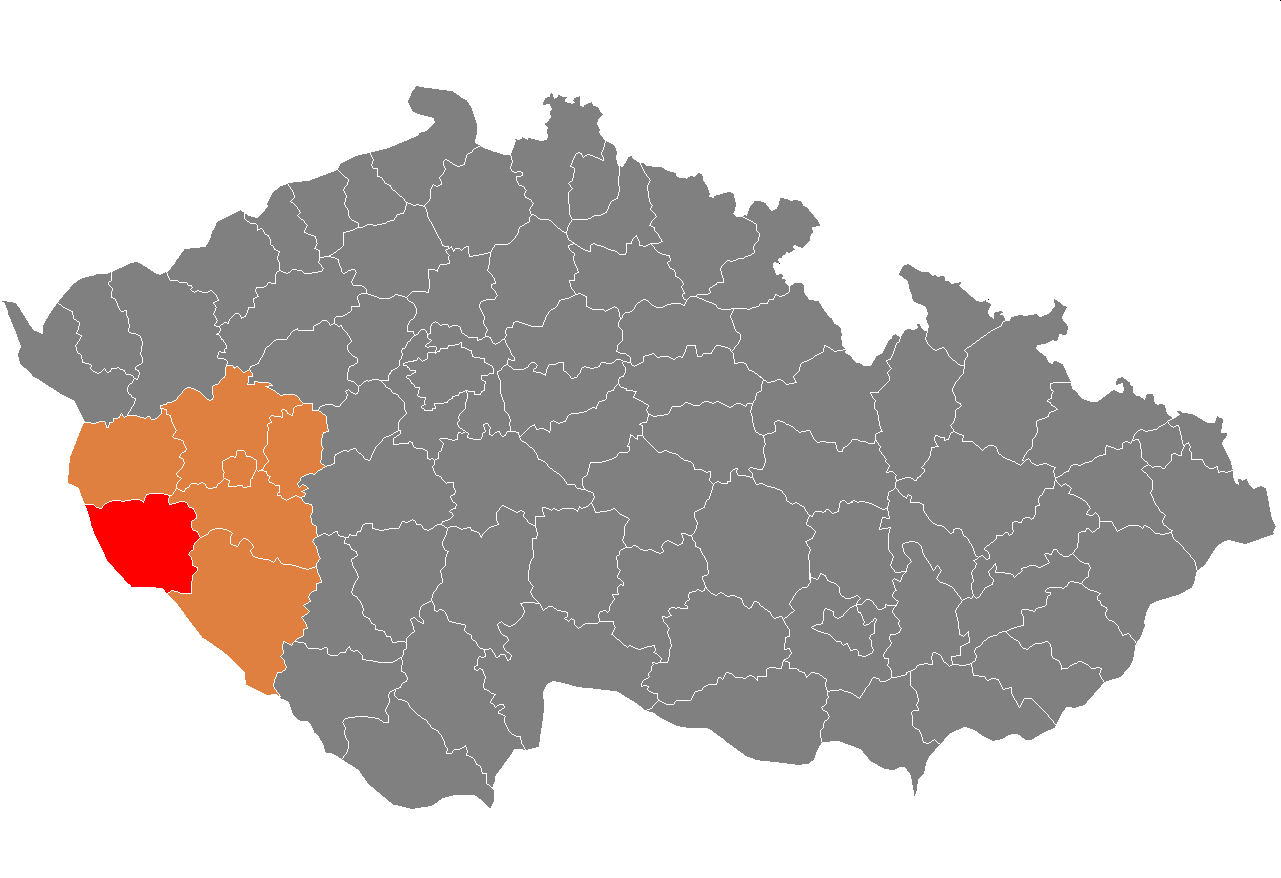
- Location in the Plzeň Region within the Czech Republic
- Coordinates: 49°30′N 12°54′E
- Country: Czech Republic
- Region: Plzeň
- Capital: Domažlice

Area
  - Total: 1,051.91 km^{2} (406.14 sq mi)

Population (2026)
  - Total: 55,625
  - Density: 52.880/km^{2} (136.96/sq mi)
- Time zone: UTC+1 (CET)
  - Summer (DST): UTC+2 (CEST)
- Municipalities: 76
- * Towns: 7
- * Market towns: 3

Domažlice District (Czech: okres Domažlice) is a district in the Plzeň Region of the Czech Republic. Its capital is the town of Domažlice.

== Administrative division ==
Domažlice District is divided into two administrative districts of municipalities with extended competence: Domažlice and Horšovský Týn.

=== List of municipalities ===
Towns are marked in bold and market towns in italics:

Babylon - Bělá nad Radbuzou - Blížejov - Brnířov - Čermná - Česká Kubice - Chocomyšl - Chodov - Chodská Lhota - Chrastavice - Díly - Domažlice - Drahotín - Draženov - Hlohová - Hlohovčice - Hora Svatého Václava - Horšovský Týn - Hostouň - Hradiště - Hvožďany - Kanice - Kaničky - Kdyně - Klenčí pod Čerchovem - Koloveč - Kout na Šumavě - Křenovy - Libkov - Loučim - Luženičky - Meclov - Mezholezy (former Domažlice District) - Mezholezy (former Horšovský Týn District) - Milavče - Mířkov - Mnichov - Močerady - Mrákov - Mutěnín - Nemanice - Němčice - Nevolice - Nová Ves - Nový Kramolín - Osvračín - Otov - Pařezov - Pasečnice - Pec - Pelechy - Poběžovice - Pocinovice - Poděvousy - Postřekov - Puclice - Rybník - Semněvice - Spáňov - Srbice - Srby - Staňkov - Stráž - Tlumačov - Trhanov - Úboč - Újezd - Únějovice - Úsilov - Velký Malahov - Vidice - Vlkanov - Všepadly - Všeruby - Zahořany - Ždánov

== Geography ==
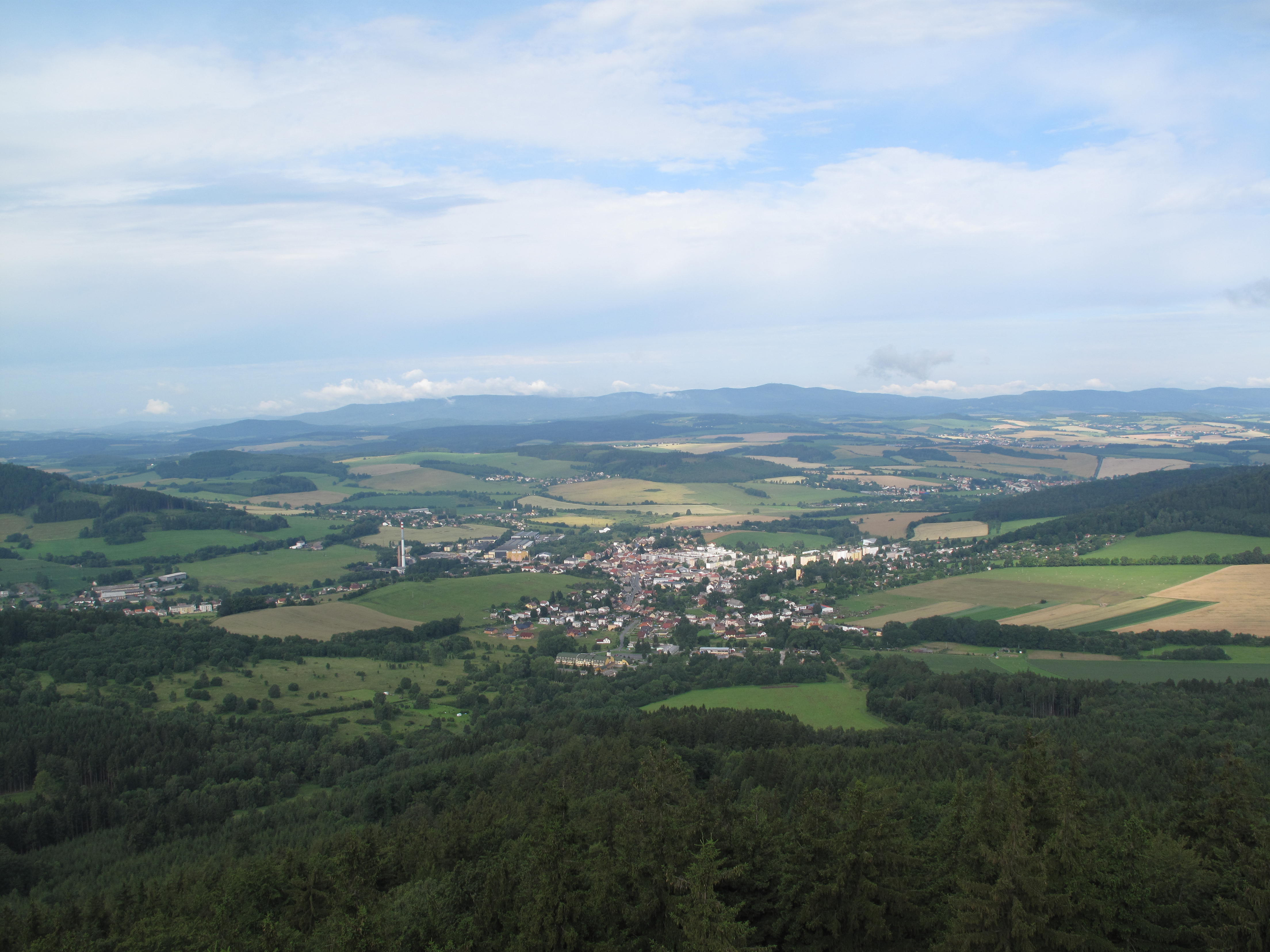
Kdyně and surrounding landscape

Domažlice District borders Germany in the west. The terrain is hilly and along the state border, the landscape is mountainous. The territory extends into five geomorphological mesoregions: Upper Palatine Forest (west), Podčeskoleská Hills (north and centre), Plasy Uplands (northeast), Cham-Furth Depression (south) and Švihov Highlands (east). The highest point of the district is the mountain Čerchov in Pec with an elevation of 1,042 m (3,419 ft). The lowest point is the river bed of the Radbuza in Staňkov at 351 m (1,152 ft).

From the total district area of 1,051.9 km^{2} (406.1 sq mi), agricultural land occupies 564.3 km^{2} (217.9 sq mi), forests occupy 396.9 km^{2} (153.2 sq mi), and water area occupies 12.9 km^{2} (5.0 sq mi). Forests cover 37.7% of the district's area.

The only important river is the Radbuza, which springs in the western part of the district and flows across the district to east. The Chamb also springs here. There are no large bodies of water in the territory. The largest is the Mezholezský Pond with an area of 38 ha (94 acres).

There is one protected landscape area: the southern half of Český les.

== Demographics ==
Historical population

Year	Pop.	±%
1869	85,254	—
1880	88,469	+3.8%
1890	87,017	−1.6%
1900	88,532	+1.7%
1910	93,055	+5.1%

Year	Pop.	±%
1921	91,214	−2.0%
1930	89,557	−1.8%
1950	55,199	−38.4%
1961	53,562	−3.0%
1970	52,645	−1.7%

Year	Pop.	±%
1980	53,913	+2.4%
1991	52,565	−2.5%
2001	52,735	+0.3%
2011	53,759	+1.9%
2021	53,769	+0.0%

Source: Censuses (Note: Excluding Bukovec, Čečovice, Černovice, Holýšov, Horní Kamenice, Kvíčovice, Neuměř, Štichov and Všekary, which were part of Domažlice District until 2020.)

=== Most populous municipalities ===
Name	Population	Area (km^{2})
Domažlice	10,973	25
Kdyně	5,132	29
Horšovský Týn	5,098	71
Staňkov	3,363	21
Bělá nad Radbuzou	1,733	83
Blížejov	1,561	25
Poběžovice	1,541	28
Klenčí pod Čerchovem	1,409	18
Hostouň	1,224	39
Meclov	1,220	32

== Economy ==
The largest employers with headquarters in Domažlice District and at least 500 employees are:

Economic entity	Location	Number of employees	Main activity
Palasino Group	Česká Kubice	500–999	Gambling and betting activities
Domažlice Hospital	Domažlice	500–999	Health care
Gerresheimer Horšovský Týn	Horšovský Týn	500–999	Manufacture of plastic products

== Transport ==
There are no motorways passing through the district. The most important road is the I/26 from Plzeň to the Czech–German border via Horšovský Týn.

== Sights ==
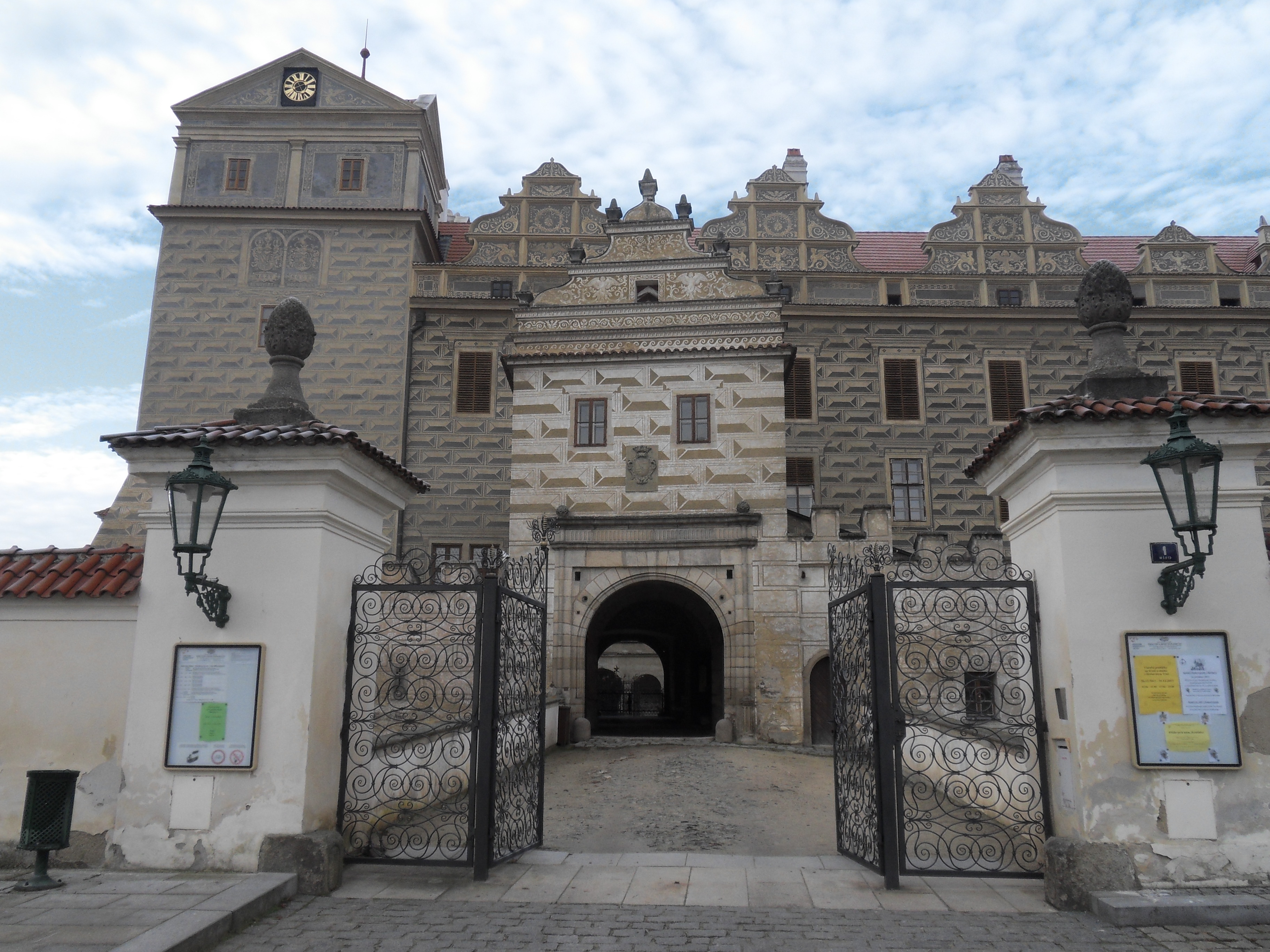
Horšovský Týn Castle

The most important monuments in the district, protected as national cultural monuments, are:

- Horšovský Týn Castle
- Augustinian monastery in Mnichov-Pivoň
- Poběžovice Castle

The best-preserved settlements, protected as monument reservations and monument zones, are:

- Domažlice (monument reservation)
- Horšovský Týn (monument reservation)
- Poběžovice
- Kanice
- Klenčí pod Čerchovem
- Pocinovice
- Stráž
- Trhanov

The most visited tourist destination is the Horšovský Týn Castle.
