= Luženičky =

- Municipality
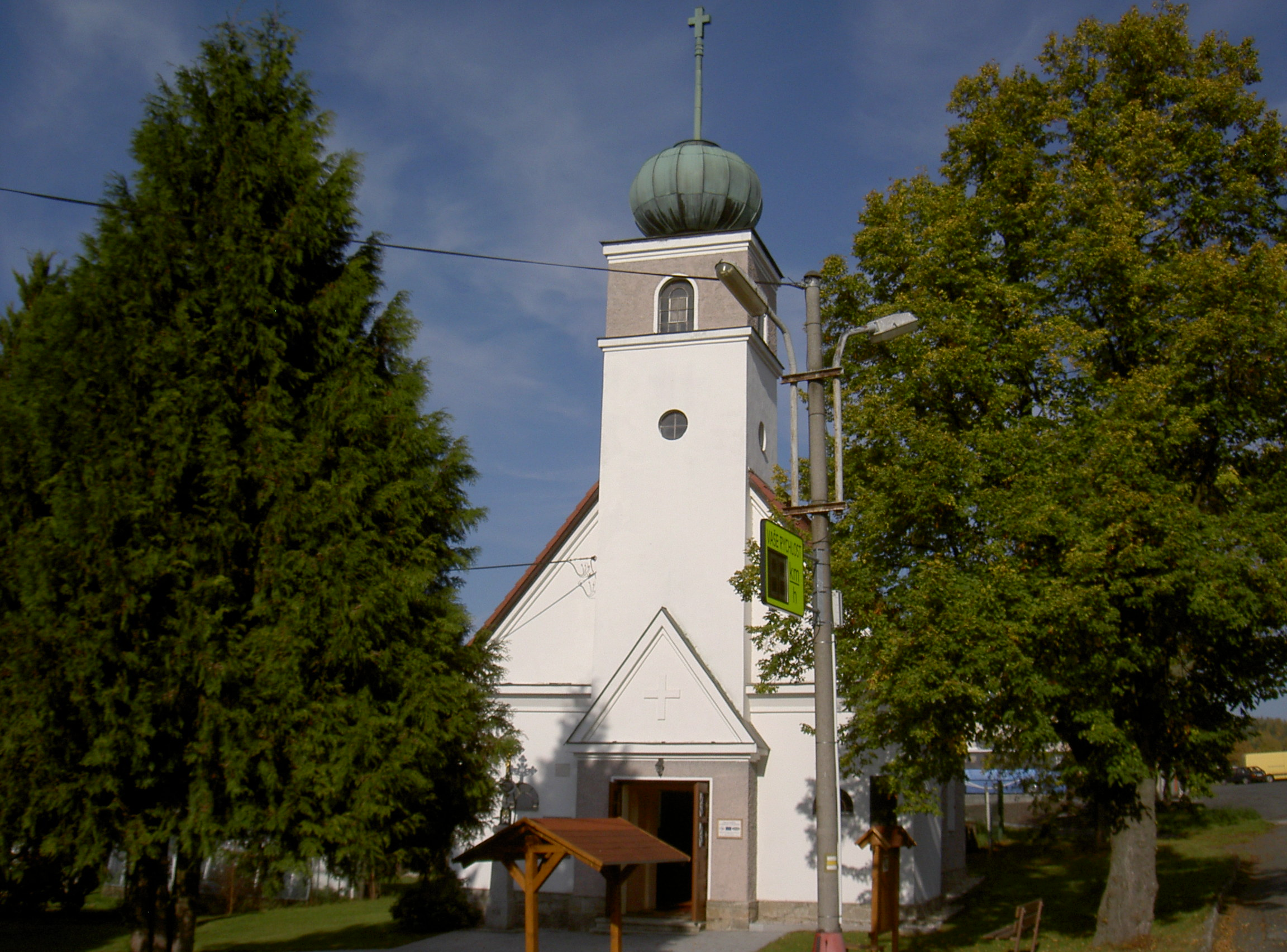
- Chapel of Saint Anthony

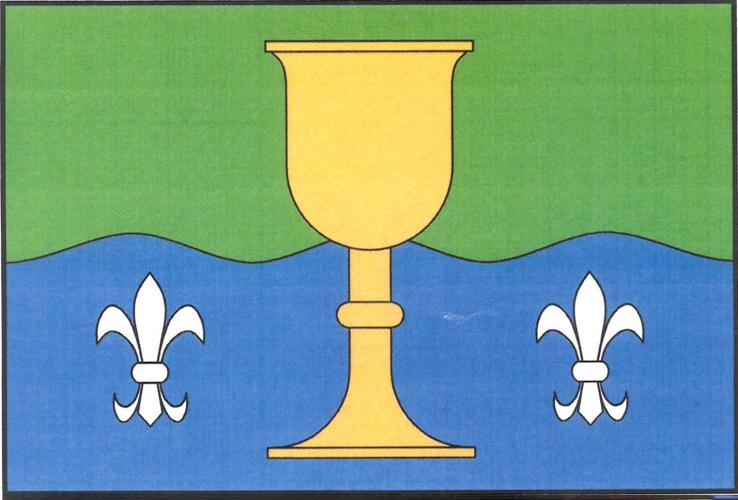
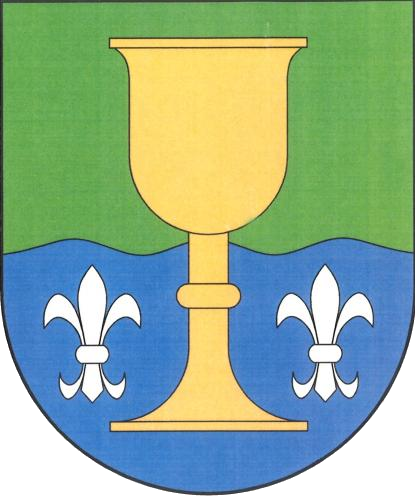
- Flag Coat of arms

- Location in the Czech Republic
- Coordinates: 49°27′32″N 12°53′51″E
- Country: Czech Republic
- Region: Plzeň
- District: Domažlice
- First mentioned: 1543

Area
  - Total: 6.29 km^{2} (2.43 sq mi)
- Elevation: 462 m (1,516 ft)

Population (2026-01-01)
  - Total: 425
  - Density: 67.6/km^{2} (175/sq mi)
- Time zone: UTC+1 (CET)
  - Summer (DST): UTC+2 (CEST)
- Postal code: 344 01
- Website: luzenicky.cz

Luženičky is a municipality and village in Domažlice District in the Plzeň Region of the Czech Republic. It has about 400 inhabitants.

Luženičky lies approximately 4 kilometres (2 mi) north-west of Domažlice, 47 km (29 mi) south-west of Plzeň, and 130 km (81 mi) south-west of Prague.

== Administrative division ==
Luženičky consists of two municipal parts (in brackets population according to the 2021 census):

- Luženičky (224)
- Luženice (166)

== Demographics ==
Historical population
Year	Pop.	±%
1869	469	—
1880	452	−3.6%
1890	393	−13.1%
1900	402	+2.3%
1910	411	+2.2%
1921	421	+2.4%
1930	398	−5.5%
1950	302	−24.1%
1961	283	−6.3%
1970	266	−6.0%
1980	272	+2.3%
1991	250	−8.1%
2001	308	+23.2%
2011	329	+6.8%
2021	390	+18.5%
Source: Censuses
