= Čermná (Domažlice District) =

- Municipality
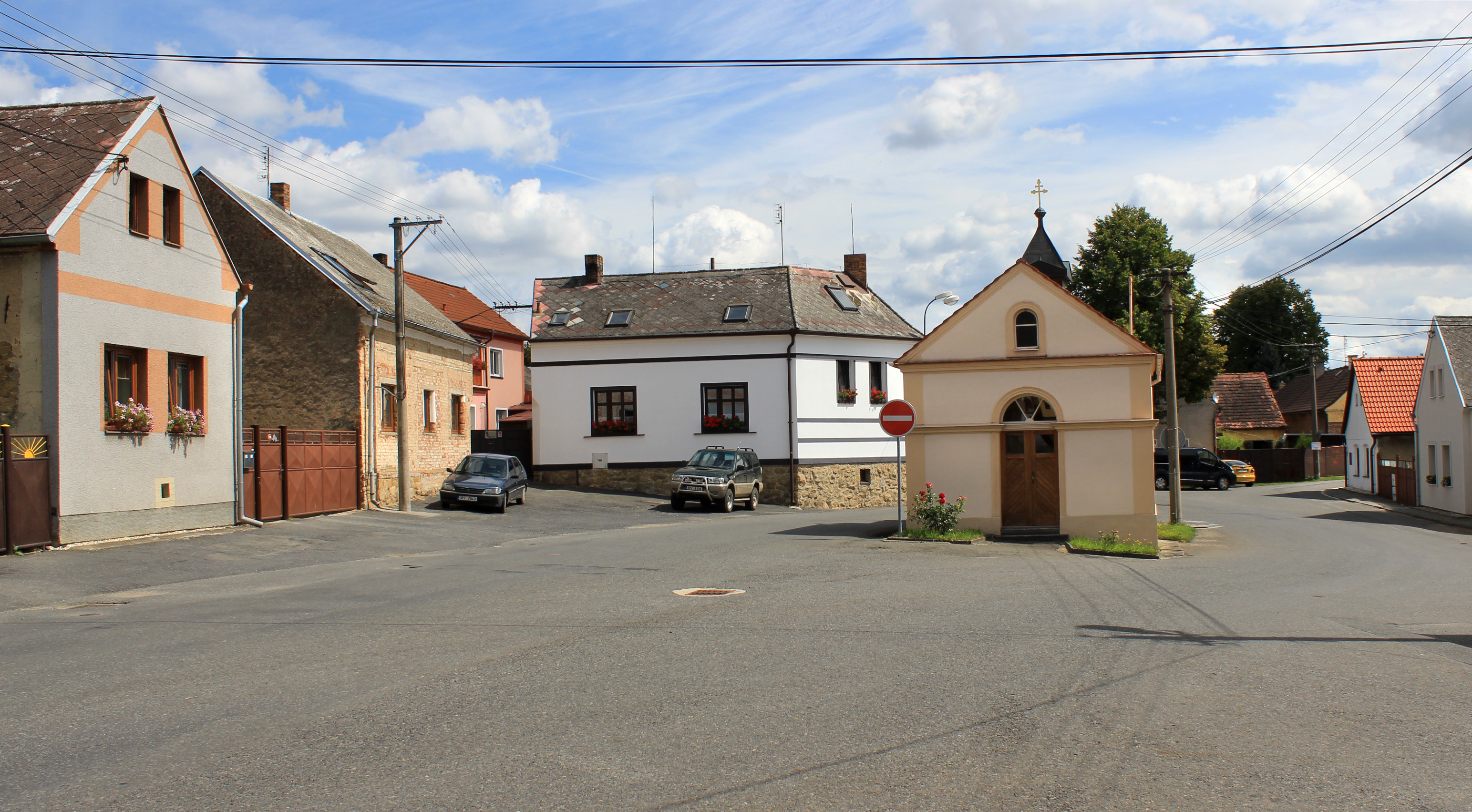
- Centre of Čermná

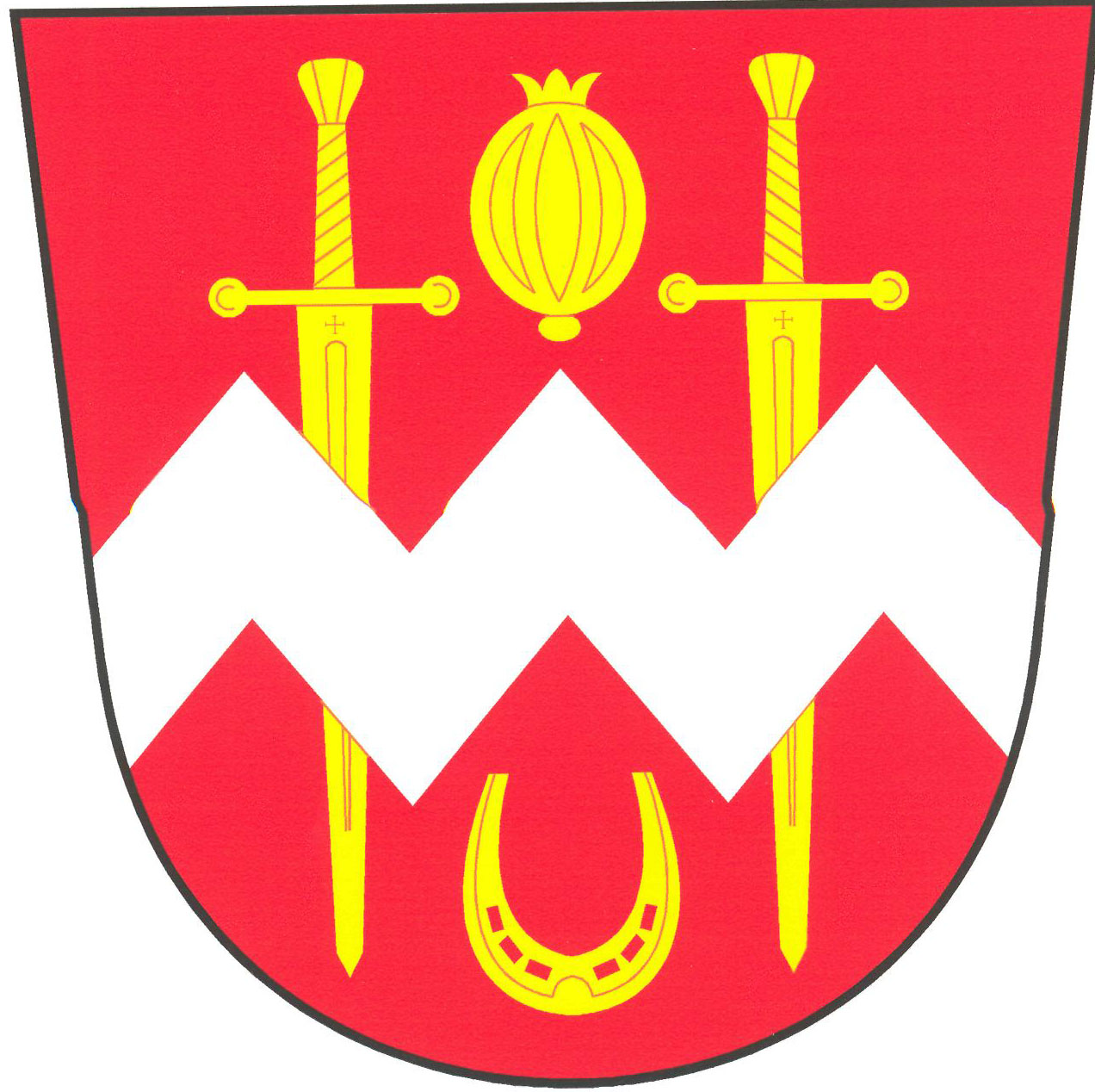
- Flag Coat of arms

- Location in the Czech Republic
- Coordinates: 49°31′54″N 13°7′0″E
- Country: Czech Republic
- Region: Plzeň
- District: Domažlice
- First mentioned: 1233

Area
  - Total: 3.25 km^{2} (1.25 sq mi)
- Elevation: 436 m (1,430 ft)

Population (2026-01-01)
  - Total: 270
  - Density: 83/km^{2} (220/sq mi)
- Time zone: UTC+1 (CET)
  - Summer (DST): UTC+2 (CEST)
- Postal code: 345 61
- Website: www.cermna.cz

Čermná is a municipality and village in Domažlice District in the Plzeň Region of the Czech Republic. It has about 300 inhabitants.

Čermná is approximately 18 kilometres (11 mi) north-east of Domažlice, 31 km (19 mi) south-west of Plzeň and 112 km (70 mi) south-west of Prague.

== Demographics ==
Historical population
Year	Pop.	±%
1869	432	—
1880	445	+3.0%
1890	429	−3.6%
1900	508	+18.4%
1910	639	+25.8%
1921	671	+5.0%
1930	613	−8.6%
1950	429	−30.0%
1961	421	−1.9%
1970	379	−10.0%
1980	311	−17.9%
1991	259	−16.7%
2001	220	−15.1%
2011	220	+0.0%
2021	239	+8.6%
Source: Censuses
