= Klenčí pod Čerchovem =

- Market town
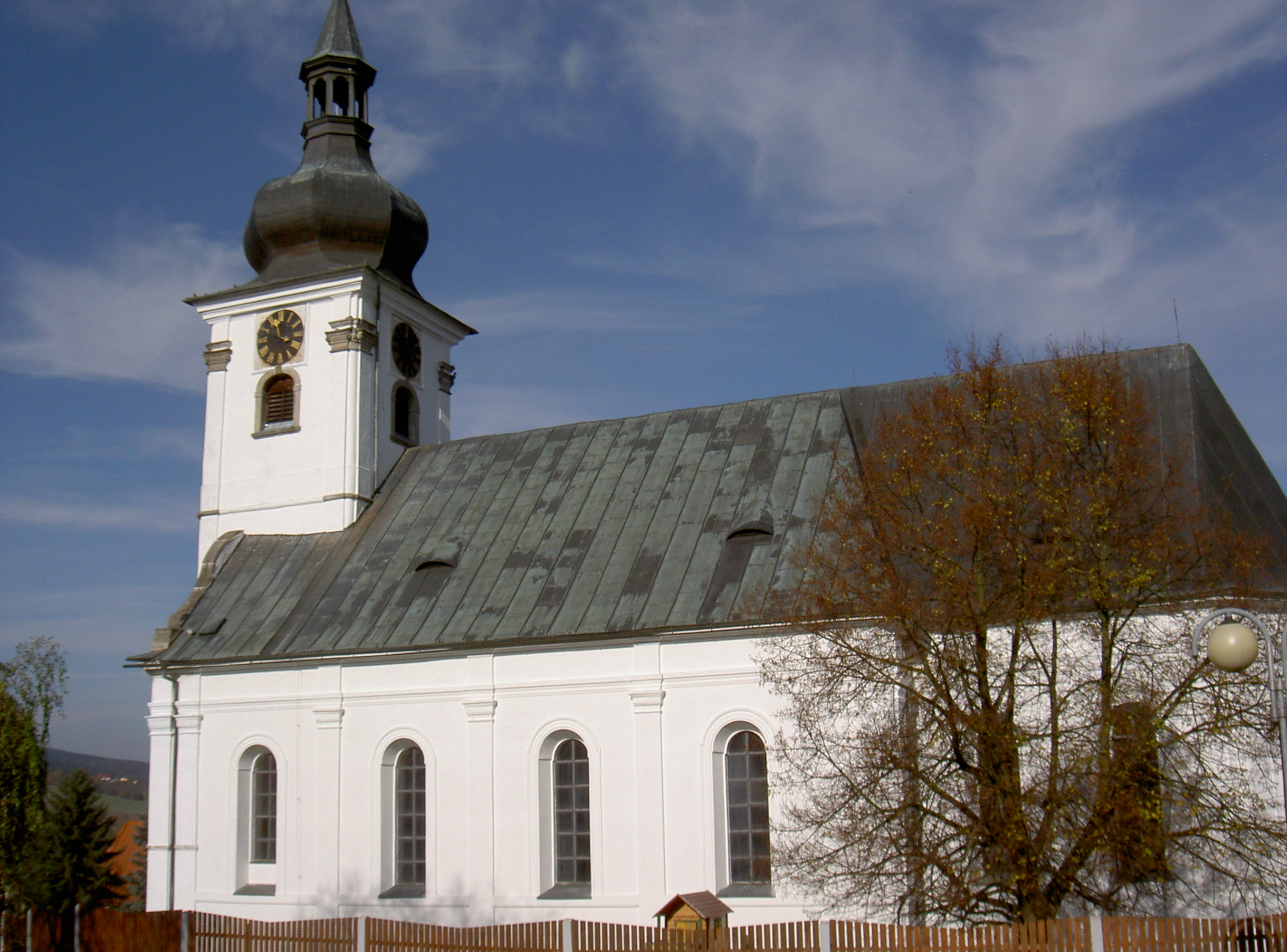
- Church of Saint Martin

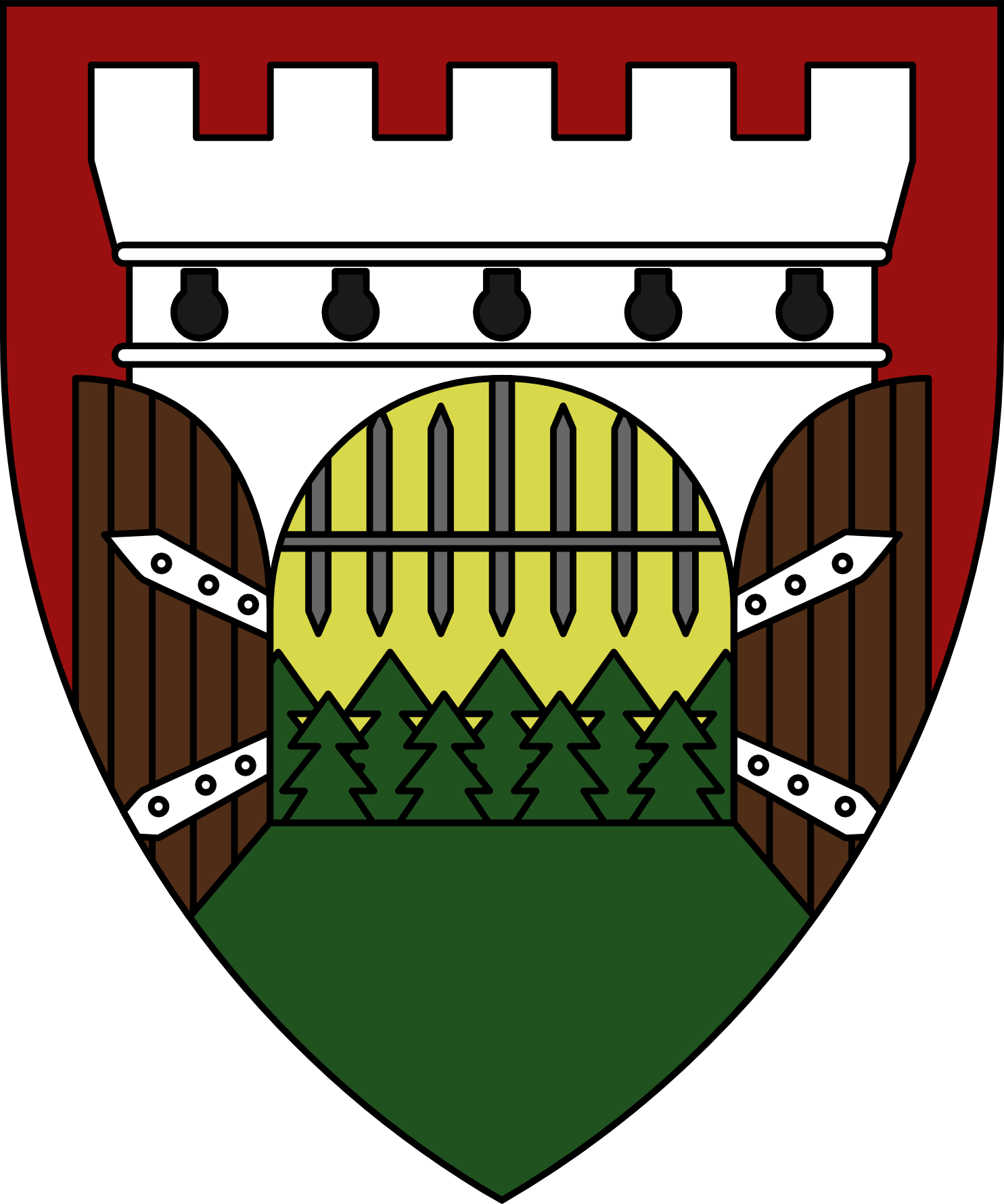
- Flag Coat of arms

- Location in the Czech Republic
- Coordinates: 49°25′55″N 12°48′53″E
- Country: Czech Republic
- Region: Plzeň
- District: Domažlice
- Founded: 1325

Area
  - Total: 18.09 km^{2} (6.98 sq mi)
- Elevation: 497 m (1,631 ft)

Population (2026-01-01)
  - Total: 1,409
  - Density: 77.89/km^{2} (201.7/sq mi)
- Time zone: UTC+1 (CET)
  - Summer (DST): UTC+2 (CEST)
- Postal codes: 344 01, 345 33, 345 34
- Website: www.klenci.cz

Klenčí pod Čerchovem (Czech pronunciation: [ˈklɛntʃiː ˈpot tʃɛrxovɛm]; until 1946 Kleneč pod Čerchovem; German: Klentsch) is a market town in Domažlice District in the Plzeň Region of the Czech Republic. It has about 1,400 inhabitants. The historic centre is well preserved and is protected as a village monument zone.

== Administrative division ==
Klenčí pod Čerchovem consists of four municipal parts (in brackets population according to the 2021 census):

- Klenčí pod Čerchovem (1,182)
- Capartice (41)
- Černá Řeka (43)
- Jindřichova Hora (1)

== Etymology ==
The initial name of Klenčí pod Čerchovem was probably Kleničie, meaning 'sycamore forest'.

== Geography ==
Klenčí pod Čerchovem is located about 8 kilometres (5 mi) west of Domažlice and 51 km (32 mi) southwest of Plzeň. It lies mostly in the Upper Palatine Forest. The highest point is the Bučina hill at 860 m (2,822 ft) above sea level. The mountain of Čerchov, involved in the market town's name, is located south of the market town, outside the municipal territory. A notable body of water is the fishpond Klenečský rybník, located in the northeastern part of Klenčí pod Čerchovem.

== History ==
Klenčí was founded in 1325 by the Chods. In the second half of the 17th century, the settlement grew and became a market town.

== Demographics ==
Historical population

Year	Pop.	±%
1869	2,089	—
1880	2,092	+0.1%
1890	1,899	−9.2%
1900	2,007	+5.7%
1910	1,949	−2.9%

Year	Pop.	±%
1921	1,950	+0.1%
1930	1,844	−5.4%
1950	1,078	−41.5%
1961	1,122	+4.1%
1970	1,061	−5.4%

Year	Pop.	±%
1980	1,070	+0.8%
1991	1,197	+11.9%
2001	1,251	+4.5%
2011	1,280	+2.3%
2021	1,267	−1.0%

Source: Censuses

== Transport ==
Klenčí pod Čerchovem is located on the railway line Domažlice–Planá.

== Sights ==
The centre of Klenčí pod Čerchovem is known for preserved examples of folk architecture. The main landmark is the Church of Saint Martin, built in the Baroque style in 1737–1745.

== Notable people ==
- Jindřich Šimon Baar (1869–1925), Catholic priest and writer

== Twin towns – sister cities ==
Klenčí pod Čerchovem is twinned with:

- Herent, Belgium
- Kleneč, Czech Republic
- Waldmünchen, Germany
