= Chod dialect =

Dialect of Czech

- Chodské nářečí
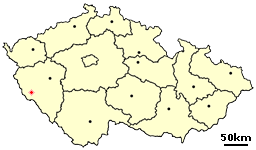
- Location of Domažlice in the Czech Republic
- Native to: Czech Republic
- Region: Chodsko, Bohemia, around Domažlice
- Language family: Indo-European: Balto-Slavic; Slavic; West Slavic; Czech–Slovak; Czech; Chod dialect

Language codes
- ISO 639-3: –
- Glottolog: sout1722

The Chod dialect (Czech: chodské nářečí) is a dialect of the Czech language. It is spoken in the region called Chodsko in southwestern Bohemia, around the town of Domažlice. It belongs to the South-West Bohemian group of Czech dialects, but has important differences from the other dialects of that group. The speakers of the dialect have traditionally been called the Chods (Czech: Chodové). The Chod dialect is among the most well-preserved regional dialects in the Czech Republic.

== Features ==
- d changes into r between vowels: standard Czech dědek > děrek, "old man".
- prothetic h before some vowels, especially u: huž (standard Czech už, "already"), hukázat (standard Czech: ukázat, "to show"). In the past this also occurred before the letters ň, ř and r.
- uncommon umlauts: smíl se (standard Czech: smál se, "he laughed").
- long vowels instead of short in possessives (naše > náše and vaše > váše), and infinitives (volat > volát, "to call").
- k instead of g in loanwords: telegram > telekram.
- Until the 19th century, the past tense forms of the verb být, "to be": standard byl, byla was commonly bul, bula; this resulted in calling the Chods by the nickname Buláci (singular: Bulák), and the dialect "bulačina". Today the "bul" forms are rarely heard, though the vowel sound in these forms is often still reduced or omitted.
- Possessive forms of animate nouns (otcův, matčin) have only one form, otcovo / matčino, regardless of case, gender or number.
- The ending -ovi to denote "the family of..." is -ouc in the Chod dialect (Novákovi > Novákouc, "the Nováks").
- Plural nouns in the dative case all have the ending -om (as opposed to standard Czech -ům or -ám).
- The cluster kd in pronouns and adverbs (such as kdo, když) is realised as hd (hdo, hdyž).

== Diachronic development ==
A 1976 study by Jaroslav Voráč showed that among younger speakers with varying academic qualifications, the only features listed above which are still retained fully are the lack of declension in possessives, the -ouc ending for families, and the long vowels in náše and váše. All other defining grammatical and phonological features in the dialect were by that time largely restricted to the older generation.

== Folklore and literature ==
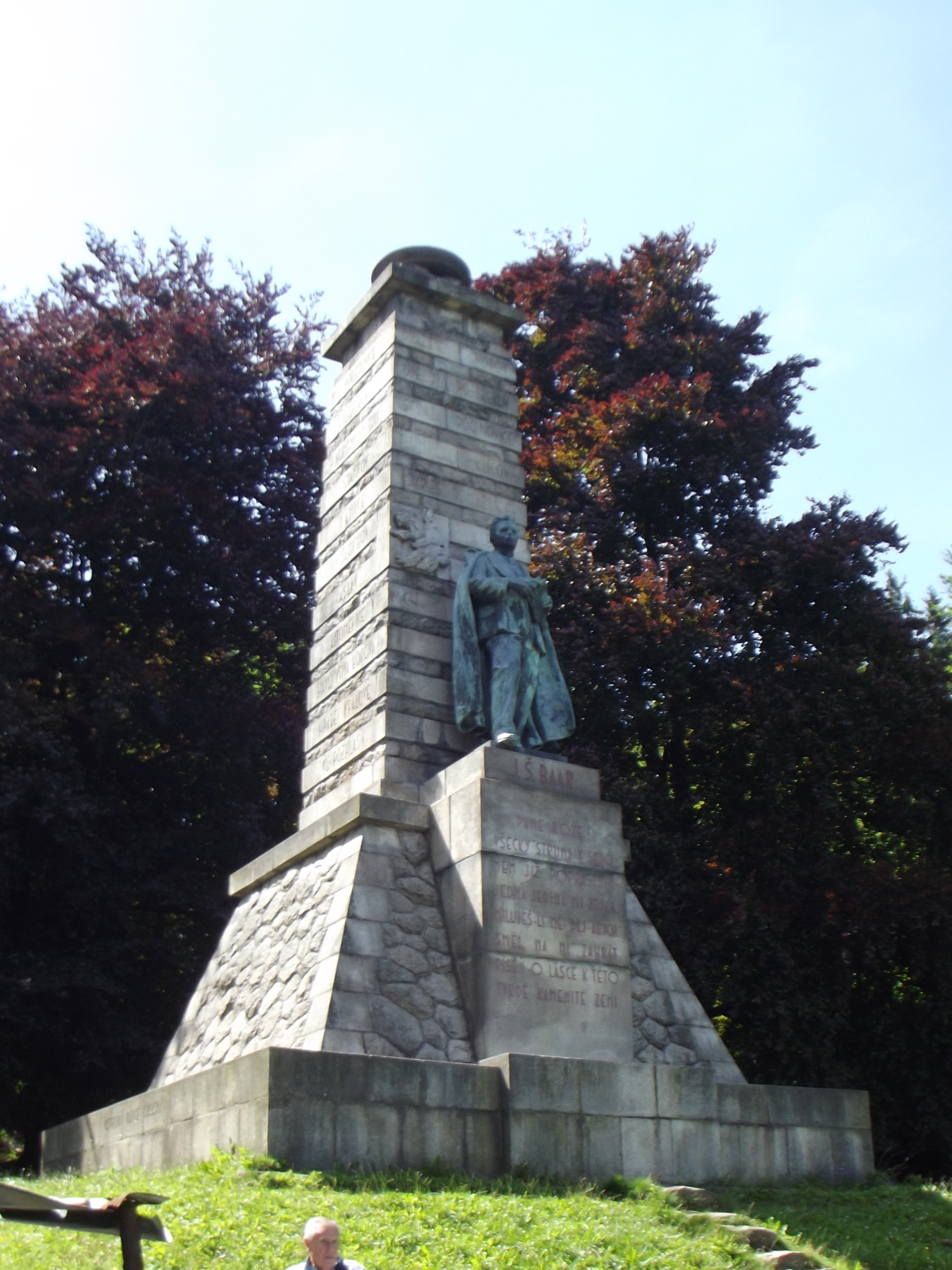
Monument to Jindřich Šimon Baar in Domažlice

The music and folklore of the Chodsko region gave the dialect a literary presence. Chod folk music was collected and archived by the folklorist Jindřich Jindřich, while the author Jindřich Šimon Baar published Chodské povídky a pohádky (Chod stories and tales) in 1922. The local culture of the region also influenced other writers including Alois Jirásek with his novel Psohlavci, in which most of the dialogue is in the Chod dialect. Božena Němcová, whose family lived in the region, wrote of the culture and dialect in her Obrazy z oblastí Domažlického (Pictures from Domažlice Region), a collection of personal letters during her time in the region.

== Example text ==
Viděli ste lidi něhdy škálníka?

Dyj prý lidem hukázal se tůlika.
Vyletí von vod Kodova ze škály,
tak jako hdyž pometlo se zapálí
Do stavení komínem pak vlítne vám,
smetanu ha máslo slízne ha ten tam.
Mlsounom je hu nás dobře, panděto,

Hdo snid máslo, na škalníka svede to.

— Antonín Klášterský.

== See also ==
- Plzeň dialect
