= Eastern Romance influence on the Slavic languages =

Although the direction of language contact between Romanian and Slavic languages is overwhelmingly towards Romanian as well as its other Eastern Romance sister languages (Aromanian, Megleno-Romanian and Istro-Romanian), there is evidence of lesser influence in the opposite direction. Romanian and Eastern Romance influence on Slavic languages is generally limited to neighbouring languages, and of those to the South Slavic languages more than the northern counterparts.

== Influence on South Slavic languages ==
South Slavic dialect continuum

=== Bulgarian and Macedonian ===
Romanian influence is most visible on South Slavic languages, in particular Bulgarian and Macedonian which goes back to the earliest centuries after the invasion of Slavic tribes in the south-Danubian territory. The lexical borrowings dominate in its shepherd and dairy-farming terminology, for example: fičor 'young shepherd' ← ficior, zira 'whey' ← zer. Linguist Maria Osman-Zavera discusses more than 200 lexical units of Romanian provenience in Bulgarian dialects. Of these words most refer to:

- pastoral activities: batut, čotura, faša, fičor, furka, gušav, kačula, kapuš, karam, karuca, katun, keptarče, kolastra, korda, koruna, kostura, kupa, mačuka, mandzara, murg, muskur, samar, sapun, scrum, splina, tufa, turma, turta, urda.
- animal and plant names: barza, botrak, buhăr, buăr, čokărlan, gagarica, kupoi, melčo, omida, paun, puika, vultur, bučimiš, floričika, foienfir, muškato, papura, vica.
- house and household items: acă, arnic, baer, burkan, boture, čarčaluša, flutur, kăstron, kl′anca, koptor, lešija, masa, năstur, pahar, pakura, palaria, pana, papuša, pat, pod, rasučala, skurteika, speteazi, zăbun, zestre.
- food: kuzunači, malai, mamaliga.
- body: burta, buza, bašăka (bășică), kăpăčină, konč, luna, moc, soarta.

Of various categories are: bezna, dižma, draptŭno, gluma, krecavo, maruncăkă, mut, pučos, vitrig, blănda, kaluš, kaprar, kičera, lauta, lingură, moš, mošija, nunko, pastrija, pomana, puškaria, rudžina, vataf.

The discourse marker май (maĭ) in Bulgarian is unanimously accepted as a Romanian loan while Aromanian seemed to have been the calque-source for the possessive perfect in Macedonian, as well as it could have calqued the l-perfect from Macedonian.

=== Serbo-Croatian and Slovene ===
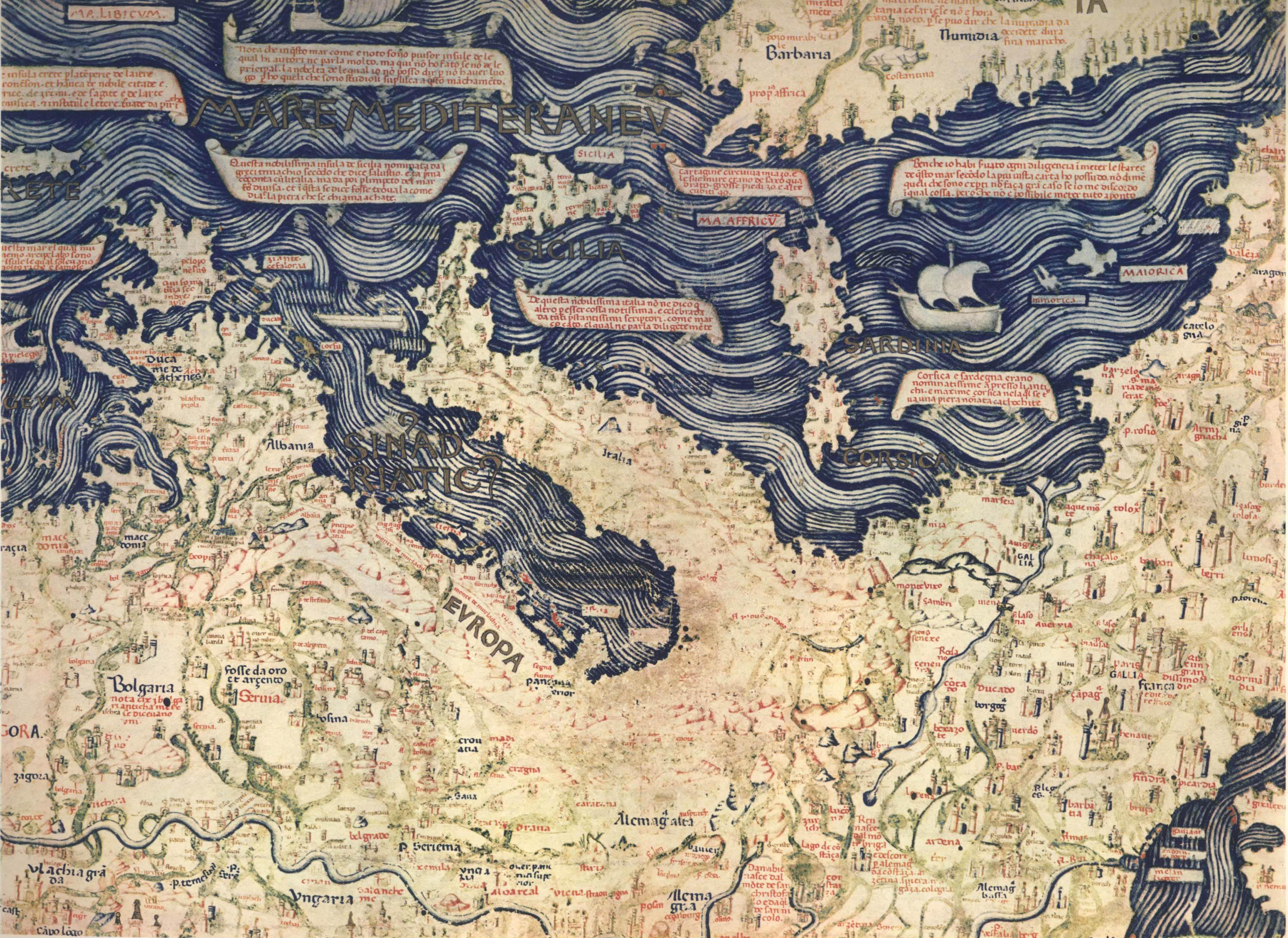
Fra Mauro map, sector XXIX - Monte de Murlachi and Monte de Murlachia shown along Northern Adriatic coast

Examples of words that entered Serbo-Croatian at wider level: brnduša < brândușă (crocus), burdelji < bordei (hut, cottage), kaš < caș (a type of cheese), čutura < ciutură (wooden vessel for wine or brandy), kustura < custură (a rocky promontory), mamaliga < mămăligă (polenta), pujka < puică (young little hen).

Istro-Romanian contributed to Croatian and Slovene regional lexes in Istrian Peninsula: birikata, glindura (Ro. ghindură < Lat. glandula), degečkati in Croatian and gadȉčkati in Slovene, mugara, petrikati, puca, sugati, šurla, žinžire. Words like bata (Ro. baltă) and čuma (Ro. ciumă) are also considered loanwords from Istro-Romanian in the region, although their ultimate etymology is disputed. On Krk island in Croatia, where a community of Morlachs was settled from the 15th century, further words such as špilišôr (Romanian spinișor) or čȕra, čȕralo (ciur in Istro-Romanian - colander) entered the local language.

Words entered the Serbo-Croatian vocabulary at the early Common Romanian stage, as well. клùсура, meaning "mountain pass", is a loanword from Greek which in turn borrowed it from Proto-Romanian, and antrešelj meaning "gap in the middle of a pack saddle", comes from a Proto-Romanian form of Vulgar Latin *intersellum.

== Influence on East and West Slavic languages ==
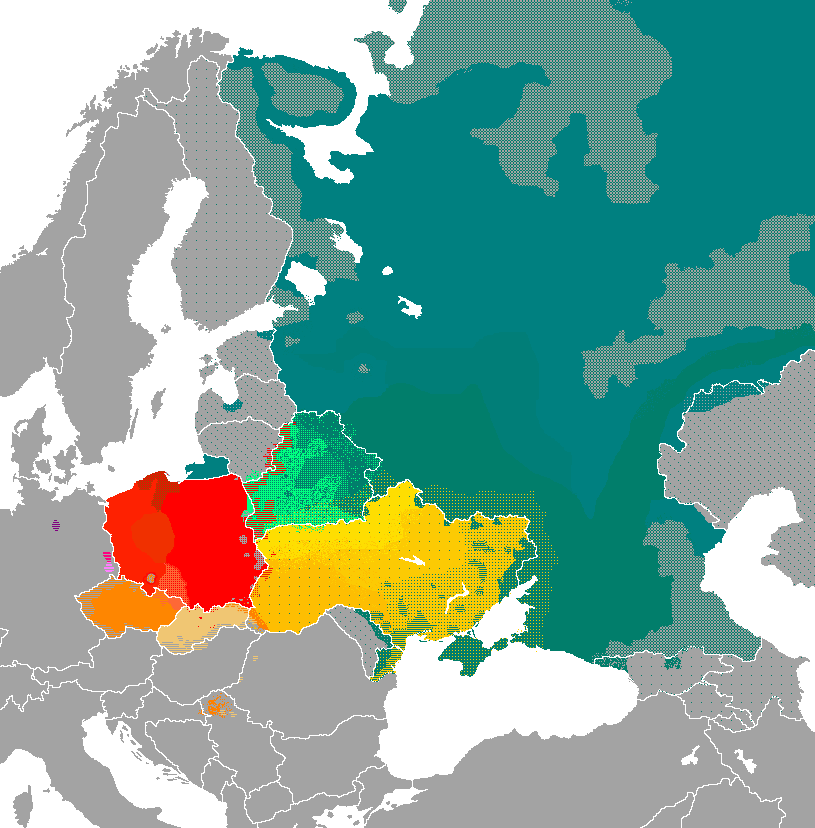
North Slavic languages

Czech, Polish, and Slovak languages have a few words in common from Romanian related to shepherd and farming terminology such as Slovak/Polish bryndza / Czech/Ukrainian brynza 'sheep cheese' ← Rom. brânză or Czech/Polish/Slovak koliba / Ukrainian (dial.) kolyba 'hut, shelter' ← Rom. colibă, although it is not clear if they are direct borrowings in each of these languages or internally Slavic mediation of borrowings. Other words of Romanian origin common among Slavic languages in the Carpathian region are: carek (țarc), čutura (ciutură), fujara (fluier), klaga or glaga (cheag), grapa or gropa (groapă), halbija (albie), komarnik (comarnic), kulastra or kurašva (colastră), laja (laie), merynda (merinde), murgana (murg), plekat' or plegat' (plecat), podišor (podișor), redykat (rădicat), rumigat' (rumegat), siuty, šuty, or čuty (ciută), strunga (strungă), urda (urdă).

Of the West and East Slavic languages more words seem to have entered Ukrainian, mostly at a dialectal level, though the Moldavian dialect: fryka <frică (fear), pizma < pizmă (envy), korkobec'< curcubetă (pumpkin), part' < parte (part), harmasar < armăsar (stallion), plačynda < plăcintă (pie), and tajstra < traistă (shoulder bag). More words can be found in the Hutsul dialect: blynda < blândă (mole, birthmark), cara < țară (country), flekew < flăcău (boy, young man), geuzura< gaură (hole), kapestra < căpăstru (halter, bridle), malaj < mălai (corn, old meaning millet), pomana < pomană (dole, alms), tjar < chiar (just, even), zgarda < zgardă (dog collar).

Moravian Wallachia's regional variety has a series of words from Romanian: arenda, bači, bir-bir (<bîr), čioara, geleta, groapa, grun, vakeška (oacheșă), kornuta or kurnuta, lak, mačiukca, magura, merinde, pastyr, redykat, klag or glag (cheag), frombia, dzer, fujara (fluier), bača, kolyba, pistrula, murgana, brynza, urda, strigoj, vatuj, strunga, vatra.

Some words have been noted mostly in Polish and in South-Western Ukrainian dialects: kalarasz < călăraș, galbin < galben, koszary < coșar, chusta < fustă, hurm, hurma < urmă, dzama < zamă, kračun< Crăciun, praštiba < prăși, byšyha < bășică, caryna < țarină, falča < falce, gyrlyga < cârlig, žerep < jneapăn.

Although there is a well-established opinion among the linguists around the world that the word ciumă 'plague' could not have come into the Slavic languages from Romanian, a couple of Romanian linguists believe otherwise.

== See also ==
- Proto-Romanian
