= Moravian Wallachia =

Ethnoregion of the Czech Republic with a Romance history

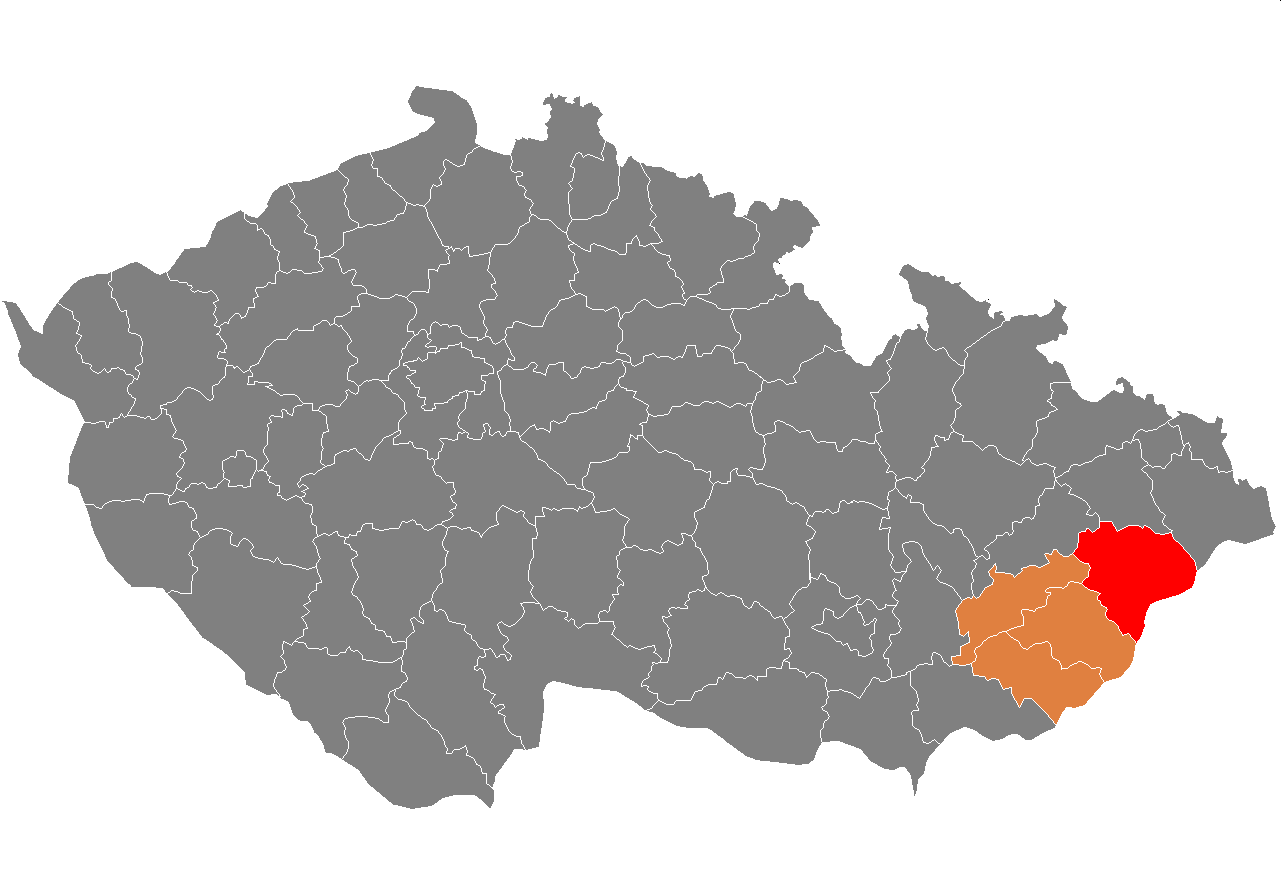
Districts of the Czech Republic that comprise Moravian Wallachia in full (red) and in part (orange)

Moravian Wallachia (Czech: Moravské Valašsko or simply Valašsko; Romanian: Valahia Moravă) is a mountainous ethnoregion in the easternmost part of the Czech Republic. It is located in the historical land of Moravia, near the Slovak border, roughly centered on the towns of Vsetín, Valašské Meziříčí and Rožnov pod Radhoštěm. The name Wallachia used to be applied to all the highlands of Moravia and the neighbouring Silesia, although in the 19th century a smaller area came to be defined as ethno-cultural Moravian Wallachia. The traditional dialect represents a mixture of elements from the Czech and Slovak languages, and has a distinct lexicon of Romanian origin relating to the pastoral economy of the highlands. The name originated from the term "Vlach", the exonym of Romanians.

== Geography and anthropology ==
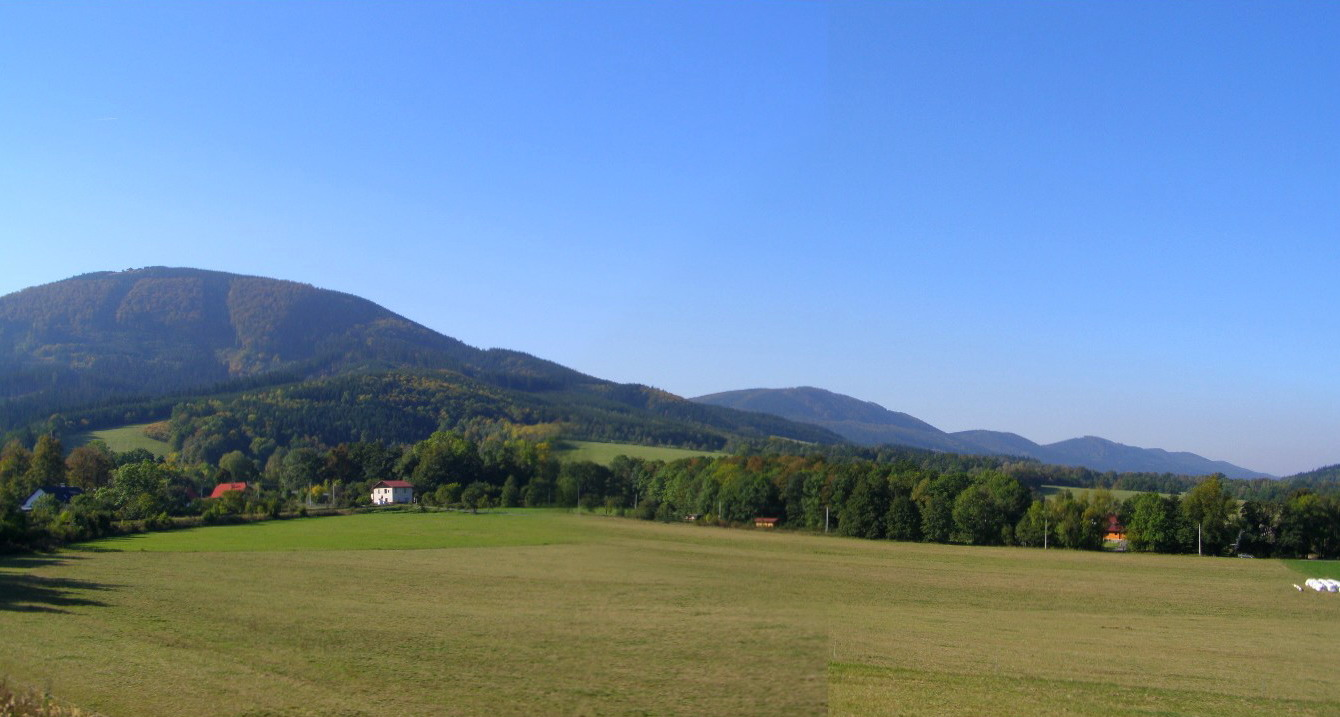
Veřovice hills, typical landscape of Moravian Wallachia

Moravian Wallachia is a mountainous region located in the easternmost part of Moravia in the Czech Republic, near the Slovak border, roughly centered on the cities Vsetín, Valašské Meziříčí and Rožnov pod Radhoštěm. It is part of the Western Carpathians.

It is bordered to the west with Lachia (Czech: Lašsko) along the Štramberk–Příbor–Frýdek line (according to Šembera) or according to dialectology (according to František Bartoš).

=== Culture ===
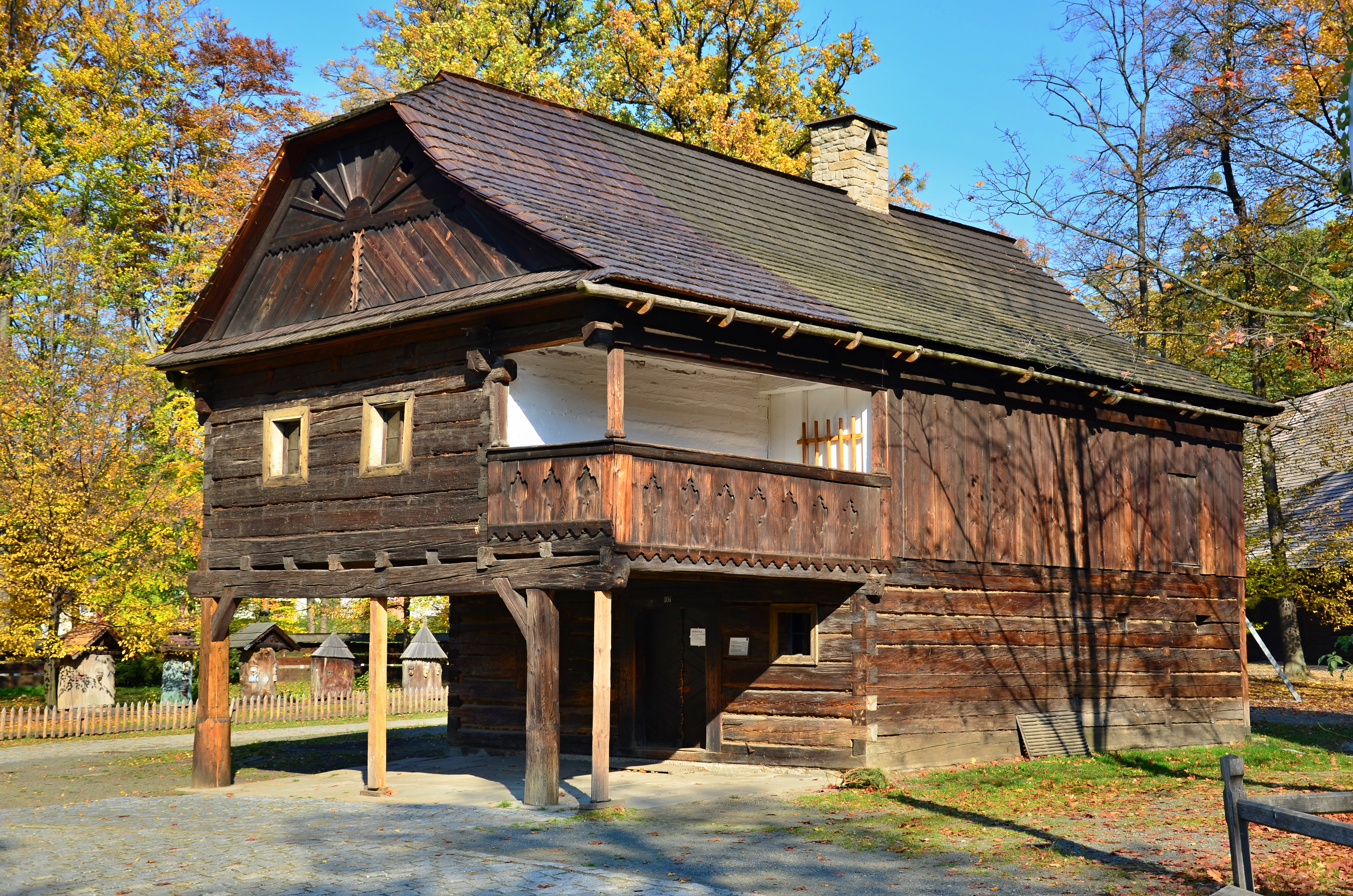
Wallachian vernacular architecture: open-air museum (skansen) in Rožnov pod Radhoštěm.

The population is traditionally pastoralist. Although animal husbandry was long associated with agriculture practiced in the lowlands adjacent to the Western Carpathians, the Vlach methods and associated rituals of sheep and goat tending were unique and newly introduced by them, as were the introduction of grazing in the highlands and the emphasis upon the production of milk and cheese (bryndza), with other specific words like košár or kotár - sheep enclosure, čutora - water bottle, fujara - shepherd’s flute with a specific melancholic sound, koliba - cottage for shepherds, and bača - head shepherd entering the local language. The "Vlach" dress are still important elements of the ethnography of the Czech Republic, Slovakia and Poland. The music of the area is thought to have been influenced by the Vlachs (e.g. see Lachian Dances), but it also represents a locally vibrant mixture of Vlach with Slovak, Czech, German, and Polish music cultures from the Tatras and Morava valley.

== History ==
=== Origin ===
It is unclear exactly why and when the Vlach migrations into what is today Czech Republic and Slovakia occurred. According to Lozovan, the Vlachs were at first Romance-speaking, Orthodox Christian, transhumant pastoralists originating in Transylvania. Kamusella notes that Vlachs migrated up along the Carpathians to Moravia between the 13th and 18th centuries and that most preserved Orthodox Christianity but were Slavicised.

The distinct cultural heritage is also mirrored by the Y-chromosome genetic results, with Moravian Vlachs resembling isolated Balkan groups such as Aromanians more than the surrounding Central European populations.

=== Early modern period ===
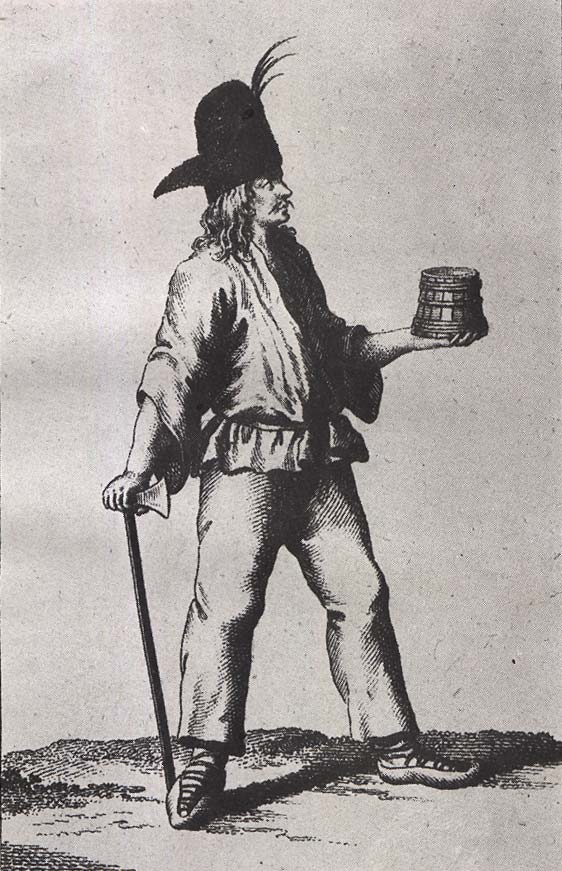
Moravian Vlach from Brumov, 1787

The Vlachs in eastern Moravia rose up during the Thirty Years' War (1618–48). They fought successfully against Habsburg rule in 1620–23, and were initially supported by rebellious Protestant Hungarians. Having had all of Moravia east of the Morava river under their control by 1621, the Vlachs were defeated in 1623, after which a series of public executions took place. They renewed attacks in late 1623, and notably defeated a Polish contingent in March 1624. In 1625–30 Habsburg and Danish armies repeatedly crossed Moravia. The Vlachs joined the Danes, and later, the Swedes. After the Danish retreat in 1627, and Swedish retreat in 1643, the Habsburgs finally defeated the Vlachs in 1644.

=== Modern period ===
Since at least the mid-18th century the population of Moravian Wallachia described itself as Wallachian. At that time, in German, the community was known as die Wallachey. Daniel Sloboda replaced the term Ualachy (Vlahi) with Ualassko (Valasko), and defined the Moravian Wallach as a shepherd, and stressed that the term had nothing to do with Romanians. He noted that the speech was of elements of Polish and East Slavic dialects.

In 1866, Hyde Clarke reported that the Moravians viewed the Moravian Vlachs (Wallachians) as an "alien race", but Slavic-speaking. They had characteristic habits and dress.

== Notable people ==
- Milan Baroš, football player
- Jan Antonín Baťa, businessman, shoemaker (Bata Shoes)
- Tomáš Baťa, shoemaker
- Tomáš Berdych, tennis player
- Radoslav Brzobohatý, actor
- Ota Filip, novelist and journalist
- Bohuslav Fuchs, architect
- Alois Hába, composer
- Markéta Irglová, singer-songwriter
- Boleslav Polívka, actor
- Tom Stoppard, British author and playwright
- Ivana Trump, American businesswoman, ex-wife of Donald Trump
- Mirek Topolánek, politician, Czech Prime Minister in 2006–2009
- Ludvík Vaculík, writer and co-author of Charter 77
- Emil Zátopek, long-distance runner, multiple Olympic winner

== See also ==
- Hutsuls
- Boykos
- Lemkos
- Gorals
- Moravian Slovakia
- Kingdom of Wallachia
