= Waldmünchen =

- Town
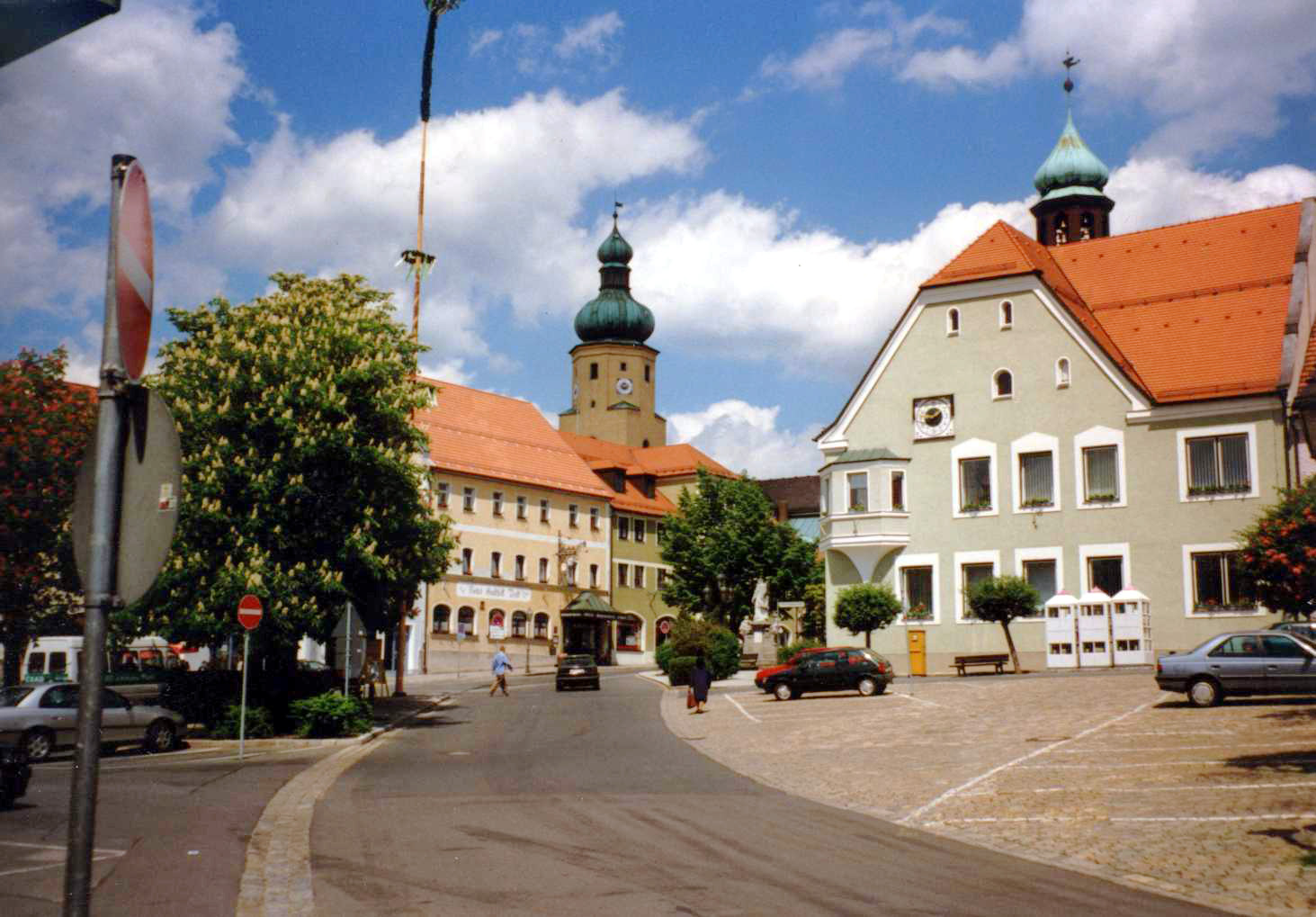
- Market square in 1997

- Coat of arms

- Location of Waldmünchen within Cham district
- Interactive map of Waldmünchen
- Location within Germany Location within Bavaria
- Coordinates: 49°22′40″N 12°42′22″E
- Country: Germany
- State: Bavaria
- Admin. region: Oberpfalz
- District: Cham

Government
  - Mayor (2020–26): Markus Ackermann (CSU)

Area
  - Total: 101.17 km^{2} (39.06 sq mi)
- Elevation: 514 m (1,686 ft)

Population (2025-12-31)
  - Total: 6,533
  - Density: 64.57/km^{2} (167.2/sq mi)
- Time zone: UTC+01:00 (CET)
  - Summer (DST): UTC+02:00 (CEST)
- Postal codes: 93449
- Dialling codes: 0 99 72
- Vehicle registration: CHA, KÖZ, ROD, WÜM
- Website: www.waldmuenchen.de

Waldmünchen (German pronunciation: [valtˈmʏnçn̩]; Central Bavarian: Woidminga), is a town in the district of Cham, in Bavaria, Germany. It is situated near the border with the Czech Republic, 18 km (11 mi) north of Cham, and 18 km (11 mi) southwest of Domažlice.

== Origin ==
The years 910 or 928 are assumed to be the foundation date.

== Mayors ==
- 1946: Johann Pregler
- 1948: Albert Pregler
- 1956: Johann Kussinger
- 1964: Max Eisenhart
- 1978: Heinrich Eiber
- 1984: Dieter Aumüller
- 2002: Franz Löffler
- 2010: Markus Ackermann, reelected in 2014

== International relations ==
Waldmünchen, Germany is twinned with:

- Combourg, France (since 1993)
- Klenčí pod Čerchovem, Czech Republic (since 1990)
- Marktoberdorf, Bavaria, Germany (since 1983)
- Elz, Hessen, Germany (since 2006)
- Plain, Wisconsin (since 2022)

== Live pictures ==
marketsquare , panoramic , from the tower
