= Plzeň dialect =

Dialect of the Czech language

Plzeň dialect (Czech: plzeňské nářečí or colloquially plzeňština) is a dialect of Czech language spoken in western Bohemia, in and around Plzeň. It belongs to southwest subgroup of Bohemian dialects and has some features that are also present in common Czech. This dialect contains many germanisms, precisely from Northern Bavarian dialects. Chod dialect is sometimes considered a subgroup of Plzeň dialect, as it has many common features. The dialect has a typical style of intonation, called Plzeň singing (Czech: plzeňské zpívání).

== Main features ==
=== Morphology ===
- Masculine animate nouns end with -í in nominative plural, instead of standard -é, even corresponding numerals and pronouns are pronounced longer: dva kluci>dvá klucí (two boys), oba hokejisté>vobá hokejistí (both hockey players), tři chlapi>tří chlapí (three men), hosté>hostí (guests).
- Sound a is lengthened in last syllables of some genitive plural nouns (vrát, kuřát).
- Nouns in other cases are often shortened. Plural locative of nouns of hard patterns ends with -ach: o klucích>vo klukach (about boys), vozech>vozach(wagons), kozách>kozach (goats), prknech>prknach (boards).
- Soft-declined masculine and feminine nouns have plural locative ending -ech: o pekařích>vo pekařech (about bakers), nožích>nožech (knives), nohavicích>nohavicech (trouser legs), kostích>kostěch (bones).
- Dative plural ending is -om, especially in masculine nouns (učitelům>k učitelom (to teachers), stromkům>stromkom (little trees), kravám>kravom (cows), kuřatům>kuřatom (chickens).
- Case endings of kost and růže feminine nouns are same, e.g. in genitive singular: do práce>do práci (to the work), pytel pšenice>pytel pšenici (sack of wheat), bez mrkve>bez mrkvi (without carrot), nominative plural: kosti>kostě (bones), zdi>zdě (walls), noci>noce (nights).
- The -u ending in dative singular of pán masculine pattern is more common than in other dialects or standard Czech: k doktorovi>k doktoru (to a doctor).
- Names of families end with -ojc (Novákovi>Novákojc), they are often indeclinable and used as surnames coined with names (Jirka Bláhojc).
- Possessive adjectives end, in all genders and cases, with -ovo: tátova košile>tátovo košile (dad's shirt), v dědově domě>v dědovo domě (in granddad's house), or -ino (sestřiny děti>sestřino děti - sister's children).
- The sk suffix of adjectives changes to ck after n, l and sometimes also after another consonants: panský > pancký (atristocratic), selský > selcký (rural).
- Genitive and a dative/feminine singular forms of nouns of hard patterns have different endings: z té druhé strany>z tý druhý strany (from the other side), na té druhé straně>na tej druhej straně).
- Pronouns já (I) and ty (you, informal singular) exchanges genitive/accusative and dative forms: nezlob mě>nezlob mi (don't play me up), dám ti to>dám tě to (I will give it to you), já se tě bojím>já se ti bojim (I'm afraid of you), sometimes even reflexive pronouns si and se undergo this exchange.
- Endings of locative singular of masculine and neuter hard-declined pronouns merge into each other: vo tom našom/o tom našem (about the ours), v čem>v čom (in what), o něm>vo ňom (about him), o všem>vo všom (about everything).
- Demonstrative pronouns and adverbs, that express closeness of things, start with tu-/tů-: tento, tato, toto>tůten, tůta, tůto (this - masculine, feminine, neuter), tohle>tudlecto (this one), tady, zde>tůtady (here).
- Interrogative expressions take -pa postfix: co>copa (what), kudy>kudypa (which way), in the kd- prefix, k is omitted (kde>depa = where), or pronounced as h (hdopa).
- Infinitive of class I verbs with -t- or -d- stem ends with -ect: jet>ject (to go by something), vézt>vect (to lead/transport), péct>pect (to bake), or -est: nést>nest (to carry/bear).
- Infinitive of some verbs shows change of á to í in the middle of the word: hřát>hřít (to give warmth), zapřáhnout>zapříst (to hitch), třást>tříst (to shake/shiver), zábst>zíbst (to chill somebody).

In some villages around Plzeň, but not in Plzeň itself, some prepositions were used in doubled forms (z>zez, "from", v>vev "in"). This feature mostly disappeared in the 1960s and 1970s but many people associate the preposition ″zez″ with the form of speech used in Plzeň and use, mostly derisively, it in the phrase ″zez Plzně″ (from Plzeň, which is ″z Plzně″ in standard speech).

=== Phonology ===
- Broader pronunciation of á (æ).
- Reduced pronunciation of i, yneighboring with l, n, ň, often in -il participles of IV class verbs: mlynář > mlnář (miller), zednik > zedňәk (bricklayer), obecní > obecňә (municipal), učil > učәl (he taught).
- The í sound after sharp sibilants is retained, diphthongisation of common Czech does not occur, : cítit/cejtit (to feel), sítko/sejtko (sieve), vozík/vozejk (cart).
- The e sound is changed to a in the middle of some words, especially after soft consonants preceding the hard ones: čep > čap (pivot), jehla > jahla (needle), sršeň > sršán (hornet), vřes > břasa (heather).
- The o vowel is changed to u inside some words: poklička > puklička (lid), kolík > kulík (peg), bota > bůta (shoe), potřebovat > potřebuvat (to need).
- The ů sound (old Czech ó) is sometimes changed to o: kůlna > kolna (shed), kůzle > kozle (baby goat), lůj > loj (tallow), růst > rost (to grow).
- Excessive diphthongisation of ou instead of ó in soe words: tůň > touně (water hole), pluh > plouh (plough); even in past participle form: usnul > usnoul (he fell asleep).
- Au in some foreign words is replaced with ou: auto > outo (car).
- Some monosyllabic pmasculine nouns have a lengthened a sound: kráj/kraj (region), spláv/splav (weir), hád/had (snake), this feature can be also found in some adverbs (tám/tam, there).
- Some two syllable feminine nouns contain í in their first syllables, which arose by lengthening: slína/slina (saliva), kníha/kniha (book), vína/vina (guilt) or by umlaut: řepa > řípa (beet), pěna > pína (foam).
- Prothetic h before ň, r, ř,: almara > halmara (wardrobe), udit > hudit (to smoke a food), jíva > híva (great sallow), nízký > hnízký (low), ryzec > hryzec (milkcap).
- Epenthesis of j before ť, ď in closed syllables: ať > ajť (so that), teď > tejď (now), paměť > pamějť (memory), buď > bujď (either).
- Prothetic stř sis simplified to tř: střída > třída (crumb), střecha > třecha (roof), střapec > třapec (tassel), stříká > tříká (he/she/it is splashing).
- The g sound is replaced by k in some foreign words: brigáda > brikáda (temporary job), guláš > kuláš, guma > kuma (rubber).
- The regressive assimilation of voiced consonants: s matkou > z matkou (with mother), s vodou > z vodou (with water).

=== Sentence structure ===
- The word než (meaning usually than in standard Czech) is also used to express exclusiveness (which is expressed by jen or jenom in standard Czech), for example: tady roste jen(om) křoví>než křoví (only bushes grow there).
- Constructions like mrznout nemrzne (it's not freezing here, literally to freeze, it freezes not).

=== Intonation ===
Plzeň dialect features a type of intonation called Plzeň singing (Czech:plzeňské zpívání), which is a strong accent at the end of imperative and exclamative clauses and Wh questions. The accent rises and then falls to a main part of utterance: Dejte to na stůl! (Give it on the table!); Kdepa jsi byla? (Where were you?). The highewst point of an accent is at the penultimate syllable.

== Vocabulary ==
Some words feature alternation of sounds or word formation: cibule > cibul (onion), nůžky > nožíky (scissors), hřbet > hřibet (back of an animal), míč > mlíč (ball), lžíce > žíce (spoon). For family members, short forms are used: maminka/mami (mom), babička/babi (grandmom) and tatínek/tatí (dad). This table contains some other examples:

Plzeň dialect	Standard Czech	English translation
čekuláda	čokoláda	chocolate
čvoch	hnusné jídlo	junk food
vošouch	bramborák	potato pancake
hejčmo	našikmo	askew
naštorc	příčně	crosswisely
hradba	plot	fence
kropáč	konev	watering can
radvánec	kolečko	wheelbarrow
nastevřít	pootevřít	to open partially
pentilka	mikrotužka	mechanical pencil
povjášet	věšet	to hang
pukl	kozel	billy goat
saturna	vlasec	fisfhing line
paňár	nevychované dítě	naughty/badly raised child
škrejpat	poprchávat	to be sprinkling
zezrnkat se	opít se	to get drunk

== Literature ==
- Balhar, Jan (1992–2005). Český jazykový atlas. Prague: Academia.
- Bělič, Jaromír (1972). Nástin české dialektologie. Prague: SPN.
- Hajšman, Jan (2017). Plzeňsko-český slovník: Pročpa tudlecto řikáme?. Plzeň: Starý most. ISBN 978-80-87338-78-0.
- Jaklová, Klára (2017). Plzeňsko-český slovník. Klatovy. ISBN 978-80-88156-01-7.
- Kvardová, Pavla (2014). Analýza běžné mluvy ve vybraných západočeských lokalitách (PDF) (bachelor thesis). University of South Bohemia in České Budějovice, Faculty of Arts.
- Voráč, Jaroslav (1955). Česká nářečí jihozápadní. Studie jazykově zeměpisná. Prague: Academia.
