= Moravian Wallachian dialect =

Czech dialect

Moravian Wallachian
- Region: Moravian Wallachia
- Language family: Indo-European: Balto-Slavic; Slavic; West Slavic; Czech–Slovak; Czech; Moravian; Eastern Moravian; Moravian Wallachian

Language codes
- ISO 639-3: –

The Moravian Wallachian dialect is a Czech dialect native to Moravian Wallachia, influenced by standard Czech and Slovak, which includes Romanian words from Daco-Romanian such as bača "shepherd", brynza "cheese", domikát "type of dairy", grapa "steep mountain meadow", pirťa "path for sheep", kurnota "horned sheep", košár "fence for sheep", kozub "fireplace", kyrdel "flock", murgaňa/murgaša "dark-wooled sheep", putira/putyra "little", strunga/strunka "garden gate", watra "fire", or žinčica "sheep whey".

For the above reasons Czech specialists hypothize that groups of Romanian shepherds from present-day Romania (Transylvania, Banat) or present-day eastern Serbia, settled in East Moravia at the latest in the 15th–17th centuries.

In the local dialect the forest-mountain-refuge was known as hora. The influence expanded to toponymy as well with words such as: magura - distinctive round-shaped hill, kyčera, grúň - deforested mountain ridge for pasture, polonina or polana - “alpine” pasture.

== See also ==
- Moravian dialects
- Eastern Romance influence on Slavic languages
