= Chods =

Ethnic group in the Czech Republic

The Chods (Czech: Chodové) are an ethnic group who used to live in western Bohemia. They lived in an arc of villages near the western border of what is today the Czech Republic, including major population centres in Domažlice, Tachov and Přimda (together called the Chod region, Czech: Chodsko, German: Chodenland).

== History ==
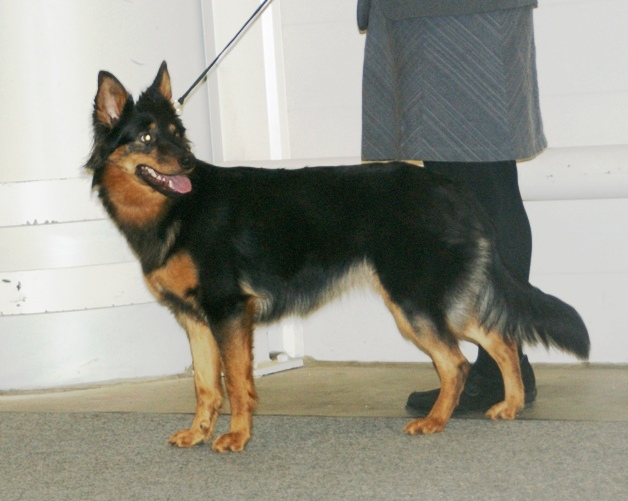
Bohemian Shepherd

The first written mention of Chods is in Chronicle of Dalimil and is related to the Battle at Brůdek in 1040, when the Chod archers helped the army of Duke Bretislav I.

During the medieval period, the monarchy of the Kingdom of Bohemia recruited the ancestors of the Chods from ethnic enclaves within the western Carpathian Mountain region near the borders of what is today Slovakia, Poland, and southwestern Ukraine (possibly including Silesia), relocating these communities to serve as guards along the borders between Bohemia and Bavaria from possible Germanic expansion into Bohemia. These relocations occurred even as the Bohemian monarchy invited selective immigration of Bavarian craftspeople into certain settlements of western Bohemia to assist in the economic and technological development within their Kingdom.

As a condition of their relocation, the ancestral Chods were made direct servants of the king, with significant privileges that differentiated them from other subjects – including the right of unrestricted movement within the Bohemian Forest region, access to the resources of the forest, and the right to own large dogs forbidden to ordinary Bohemian peasantry. In 1325, King John of Bohemia acknowledged the rights of the Chod people to use the woods of western Bohemia, provided that they also protected the borders along them. The Chods bred special dogs to help accomplish this goal – especially the Bohemian Shepherd (in Czech Chodský pes) which some sources suggest is ancestral to the modern German Shepherd. Chods traveled widely throughout the mountains of western Bohemia as part of their unique charge and rare freedom, often using special walking staffs, boots, and wide-brimmed hats especially suited to long-distance travel in the mountain forests. Reflected in their ethnonym, implying "walkers," "rangers" or "patrollers," they represent a rare example of a professional identity coming to define a group's overall ethnic designation.

For over three and a half centuries, the terms of the Chod agreement with the Bohemian monarchy held until the late 17th century when a local aristocrat of German origin, W. M. Laminger von Albenreuth, declared the agreement void – seeking to contain and undermine the autonomy of Chods and other Czech peasants. The Chods revolted in 1695, but were unsuccessful. Many persisted as independent ethnic enclaves in the mountains of western Bohemia, while others were fully or partially assimilated into Czech-speaking or occasionally German-speaking communities of Czech and/or German ethnicity in the adjacent countryside. As Czech nationalism arose through the 19th century, Chods cultural became emblematic of Slavic resistance to German cultural influence in Czech popular culture – shaping perceptions of Chod people both within and beyond western Bohemia, and reasserting their identity in opposition to ethnically German Bohemians in spite of a long and complex history linking the two groups.

== Chods since the 20th century ==
The events of World War II, including the brutal occupation of the Chod region as part of Nazi Germany's Sudetenland annexation, followed by the disorderly and brutal expulsion by the Czechs of German-speakers from western Bohemia at the war's end, contributed to a significant decline in the scale and distribution of the Chod population within western Bohemia. Still, up to 11 villages of Chods persist, and many still live in the countryside near towns such as Domažlice. They speak the Chod dialect, a separate dialect of Czech, enjoy unique and strong traditions such as the use of special folk costume and musical instruments; they maintain a strong sense of identity that is linked to the Bohemian Forest and their role as defenders of the western Bohemian borderland.

== Chods in art and literature ==
The Chods have been the focus of art and literature, much of it tied to Czech romanticist and nationalist themes. The Czech painter Jaroslav Špillar lived among them for many years, capturing scenes from their daily life.

== Notable people ==
- Jan Sladký Kozina (1652–1695), revolutionary leader
