= Jindřich Šimon Baar =

Czech priest & writer (1869–1925)

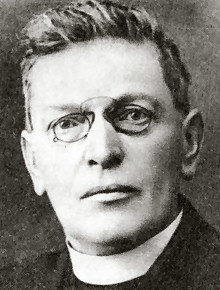
- Born: 7 February 1869; Klenčí pod Čerchovem, Bohemia, Austria-Hungary
- Died: 24 October 1925 (aged 56); Klenčí pod Čerchovem, Czechoslovakia
- Occupations: Priest, author
- Writing career
- Genre: Novels

Jindřich Šimon Baar (Czech pronunciation; 7 February 1869 – 24 October 1925) was a Czech Catholic priest and writer, realist, author of the so-called country prose. He joined the Czech Catholic modern style, but later severed the ties with that movement. As writer, he emphasized traditional moral values of the countryside.

Born into a peasant family, he did religious studies and was ordained as a Catholic priest in 1892. As a priest, he strived, unsuccessfully, for reforms in the church.

== Works ==
Among his novels are:

- Cestou křížovou (1900) – the first fruit, autobiographic description of the uneasy life as a reform priest
- Pro kravičku (1905)
- Farská panička (1906)
- Farské historky (1908)
- Jan Cimbura (1908) – highly idealized depiction of peasant life
- historical trilogy: Paní komisarka (1923), Osmačtyřicátníci (1924) and Lůsy (1925)

He also published several short stories and collections of fairy tales.

== See also ==
- List of Czech writers
