= Kleneč =

- Municipality
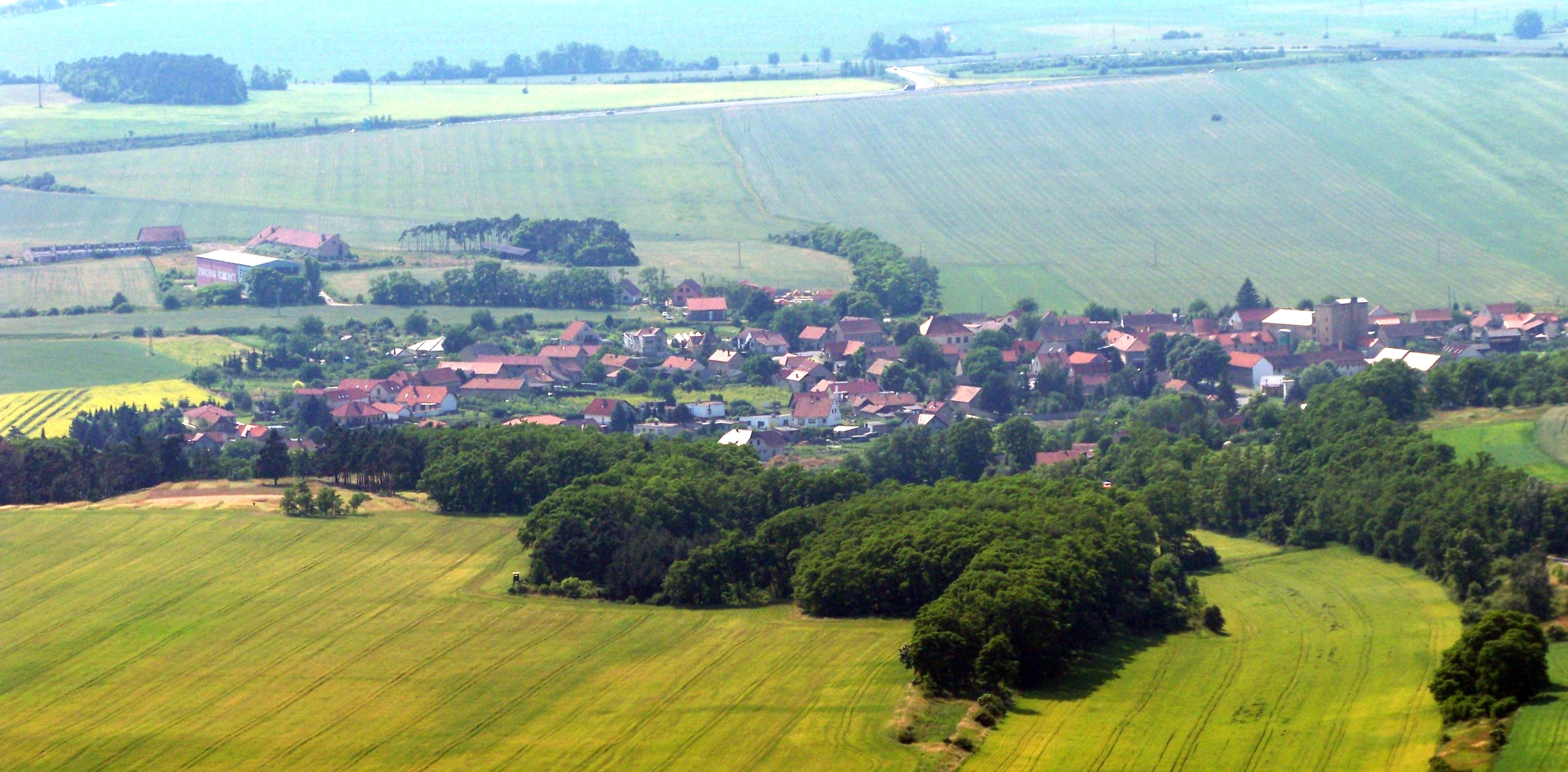
- General view

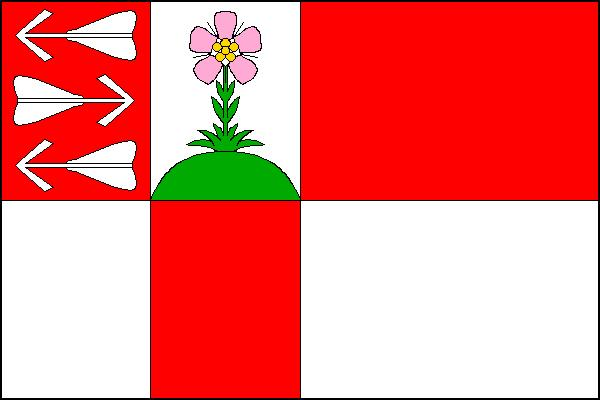
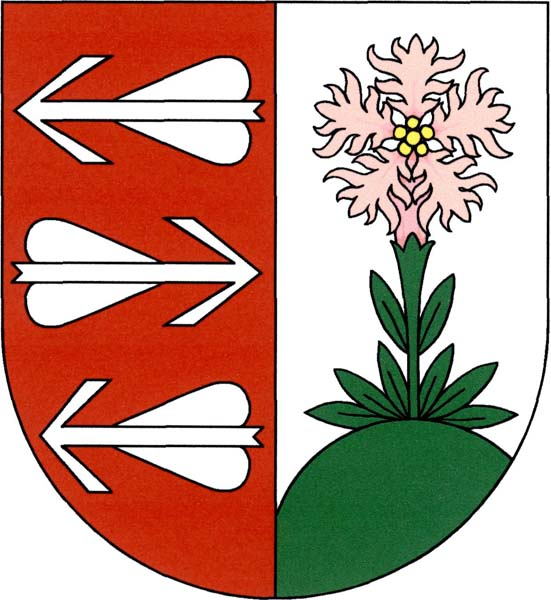
- Flag Coat of arms

- Location in the Czech Republic
- Coordinates: 50°23′34″N 14°14′56″E
- Country: Czech Republic
- Region: Ústí nad Labem
- District: Litoměřice
- First mentioned: 1400

Area
  - Total: 5.86 km^{2} (2.26 sq mi)
- Elevation: 195 m (640 ft)

Population (2026-01-01)
  - Total: 593
  - Density: 101/km^{2} (262/sq mi)
- Time zone: UTC+1 (CET)
  - Summer (DST): UTC+2 (CEST)
- Postal code: 413 01
- Website: www.klenec.cz

Kleneč is a municipality and village in Litoměřice District in the Ústí nad Labem Region of the Czech Republic. It has about 600 inhabitants.

Kleneč lies approximately 18 kilometres (11 mi) south-east of Litoměřice, 33 km (21 mi) south-east of Ústí nad Labem, and 37 km (23 mi) north of Prague.

== Demographics ==
Historical population
Year	Pop.	±%
1869	297	—
1880	443	+49.2%
1890	434	−2.0%
1900	466	+7.4%
1910	669	+43.6%
1921	629	−6.0%
1930	650	+3.3%
1950	527	−18.9%
1961	546	+3.6%
1970	475	−13.0%
1980	464	−2.3%
1991	405	−12.7%
2001	398	−1.7%
2011	478	+20.1%
2021	560	+17.2%
Source: Censuses
