= Czech language =

West Slavic language

Czech
- čeština, český jazyk
- Native to: Czech Republic
- Ethnicity: Czechs
- Speakers: L1: 9.8 million (2021); L2: 2.7 million (2012); Total: 12 million (2012–2021)
- Language family: Indo-European: Balto-Slavic; Slavic; West Slavic; Czech–Slovak; Czech
- Dialects: Bohemian; Central Moravian; Eastern Moravian; Lach; Knaanic †; Chod; Plzeň; Moravian Wallachian
- Writing system: Latin script (Czech alphabet); Czech Braille

Official status
- Official language in: Czech Republic; European Union
- Recognised minority language in: Austria; Bosnia and Herzegovina; Croatia; Poland; Romania; Slovakia; Ukraine
- Regulated by: Institute of the Czech Language (of the Academy of Sciences of the Czech Republic)

Language codes
- ISO 639-1: cs
- ISO 639-2: cze (B) ces (T)
- ISO 639-3: ces
- Glottolog: czec1258
- Linguasphere: 53-AAA-da < 53-AAA-b...-d (varieties: 53-AAA-daa to 53-AAA-dam)
- IETF: cs
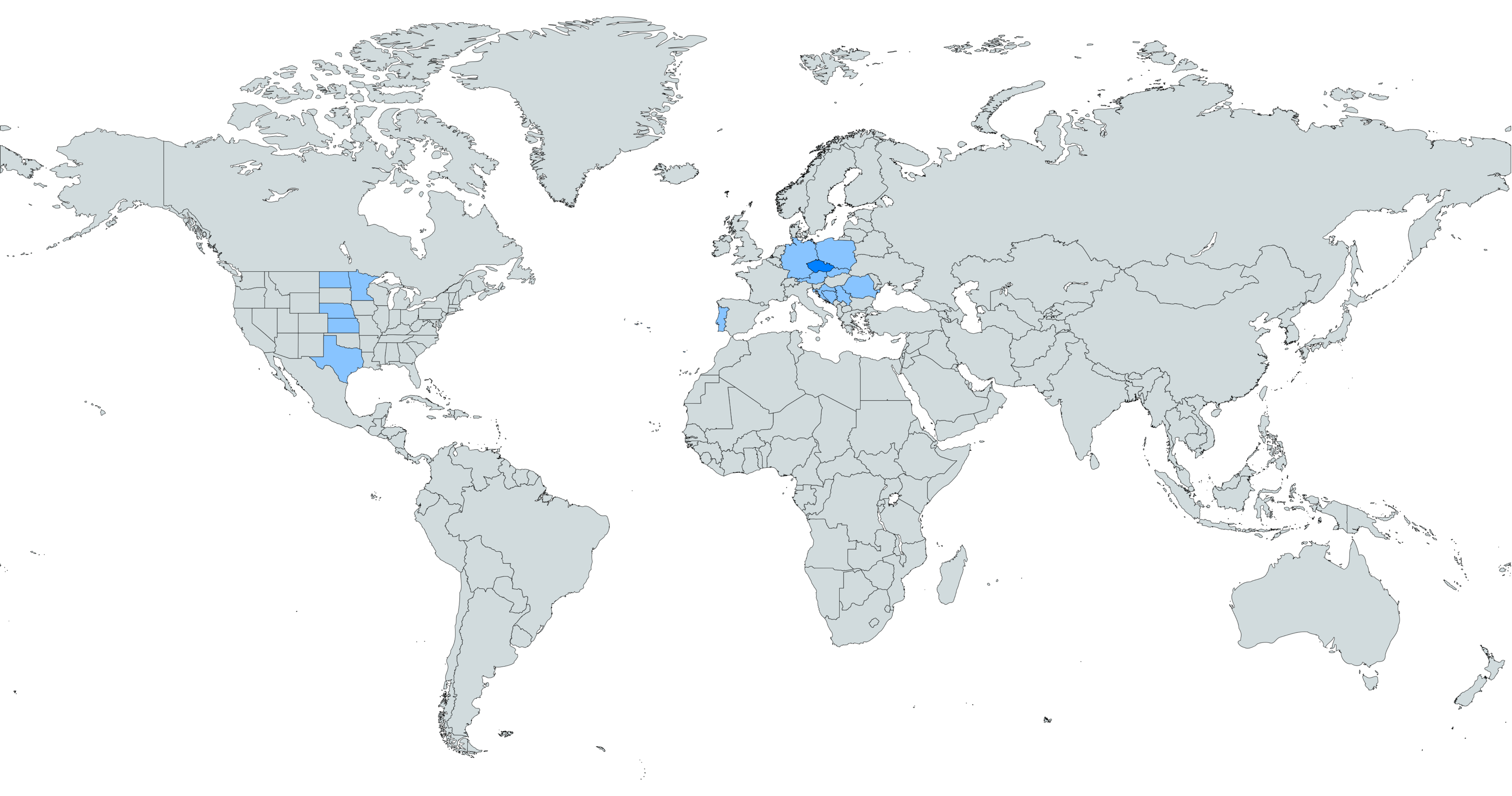
- Spoken by a majority; Spoken by a minority

Czech (/tʃɛk/ CHEK; endonym: čeština [ˈtʃɛʃcɪna]), historically known as Bohemian (/boʊˈhiːmiən, bə-/ boh-HEE-mee-ən, bə-; Latin: lingua Bohemica), is a West Slavic language of the Czech–Slovak group, written in Latin script. Spoken by over 12 million people including second-language speakers, it serves as the official language of the Czech Republic. Czech is closely related to Slovak, to the point of high mutual intelligibility, as well as to Polish to a lesser degree. Czech is a fusional language with a rich system of morphology and relatively flexible word order. Its vocabulary has been extensively influenced by Latin and German.

The Czech–Slovak group developed within West Slavic in the high medieval period, and the standardization of Czech and Slovak within the Czech–Slovak dialect continuum emerged in the early modern period. In the later 18th to mid-19th century, the modern written standard became codified in the context of the Czech National Revival. The most widely spoken non-standard variety, known as Common Czech, is based on the vernacular of Prague, but is now spoken as an interdialect throughout most of Bohemia. The Moravian dialects spoken in Moravia and Czech Silesia are considerably more varied than the dialects of Bohemia.

Czech has a moderately-sized phoneme inventory, comprising ten monophthongs, three diphthongs and 25 consonants (divided into "hard", "neutral" and "soft" categories). Words may contain complicated consonant clusters or lack vowels altogether. Czech has a raised alveolar trill, which is known to occur as a phoneme in only a few other languages, represented by the grapheme ř.

== Classification ==
Czech is a member of the West Slavic sub-branch of the Slavic branch of the Indo-European language family. This branch includes Polish, Kashubian, Upper and Lower Sorbian and Slovak. Slovak is the most closely related language to Czech, followed by Polish and Silesian.

The West Slavic languages are spoken in Central Europe. Czech is distinguished from other West Slavic languages by a more-restricted distinction between "hard" and "soft" consonants (see Phonology below).

== History ==
=== Medieval/Old Czech ===
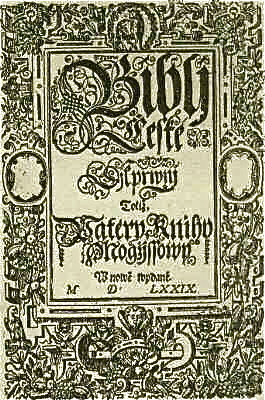
The Bible of Kralice was the first complete translation of the Bible into the Czech language from the original languages. Its six volumes were first published between 1579 and 1593.

The term "Old Czech" is applied to the period predating the 16th century, with the earliest records of the high medieval period also classified as "early Old Czech", but the term "Medieval Czech" is also used. The function of the written language was initially performed by Old Slavonic written in Glagolitic, later by Latin written in Latin script.

Around the 7th century, the Slavic expansion reached Central Europe, settling on the eastern fringes of the Frankish Empire. The West Slavic polity of Great Moravia formed by the 9th century. The Christianization of Bohemia took place during the 9th and 10th centuries. The diversification of the Czech-Slovak group within West Slavic began around that time, marked among other things by its use of the voiced velar fricative consonant (/ɣ/) and consistent stress on the first syllable.

The Bohemian (Czech) language is first recorded in writing in glosses and short notes during the 12th to 13th centuries. Literary works written in Czech appear in the late 13th and early 14th century and administrative documents first appear towards the late 14th century. The first complete Bible translation, the Leskovec-Dresden Bible, also dates to this period. Old Czech texts, including poetry and cookbooks, were also produced outside universities.

Literary activity becomes widespread in the early 15th century in the context of the Bohemian Reformation. Jan Hus contributed significantly to the standardization of Czech orthography, advocated for widespread literacy among Czech commoners (particularly in religion) and made early efforts to model written Czech after the spoken language.

=== Early Modern Czech ===
There was no standardization distinguishing between Czech and Slovak prior to the 15th century. In the 16th century, the division between Czech and Slovak becomes apparent, marking the confessional division between Lutheran Protestants in Slovakia using Czech orthography and Catholics, especially Slovak Jesuits, beginning to use a separate Slovak orthography based on Western Slovak dialects.

The publication of the Kralice Bible between 1579 and 1593 (the first complete Czech translation of the Bible from the original languages) became very important for standardization of the Czech language in the following centuries as it was used as a model for the standard language.

In 1615, the Bohemian diet tried to declare Czech to be the only official language of the kingdom. After the Bohemian Revolt (of predominantly Protestant aristocracy) which was defeated by the Habsburgs in 1620, the Protestant intellectuals had to leave the country. This emigration together with other consequences of the Thirty Years' War had a negative impact on the further use of the Czech language. In 1627, Czech and German became official languages of the Kingdom of Bohemia and in the 18th century German became dominant in Bohemia and Moravia, especially among the upper classes.

=== Modern Czech ===
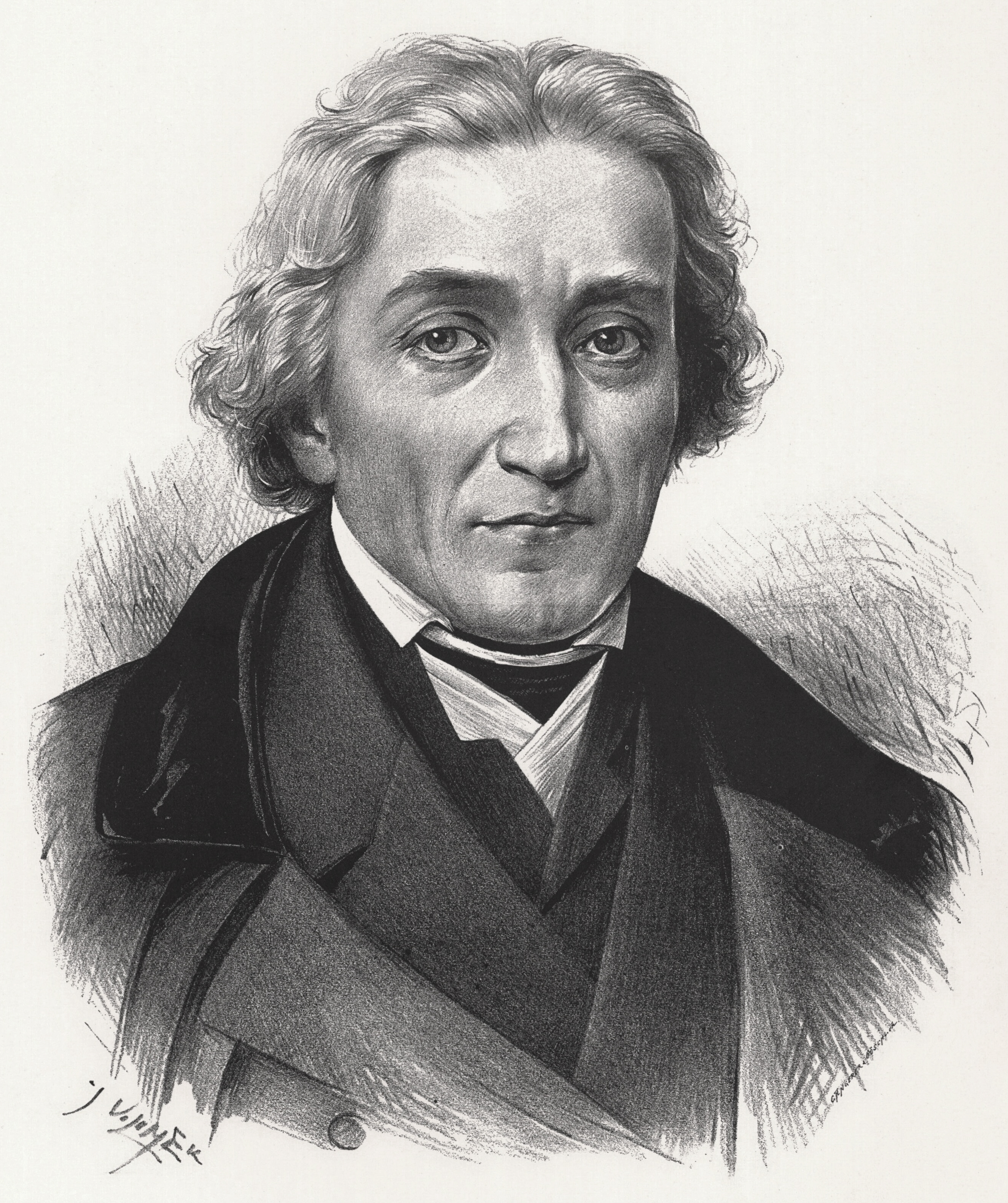
Josef Dobrovský, whose writing played a key role in reviving Czech as a written language

Modern standard Czech originates in standardization efforts of the 18th century. By then the language had developed a literary tradition, and since then it has changed little; journals from that period contain no substantial differences from modern standard Czech, and contemporary Czechs can understand them with little difficulty. At some point before the 18th century, the Czech language abandoned a distinction between phonemic /l/ and /ʎ/ which survives in Slovak.

With the beginning of the national revival of the mid-18th century, Czech historians began to emphasize their people's accomplishments from the 15th through 17th centuries, rebelling against the Counter-Reformation (the Habsburg re-Catholicisation efforts which had denigrated Czech and other non-Latin languages). Czech philologists studied sixteenth-century texts and advocated the return of the language to high culture. This period is known as the Czech National Revival (or Renaissance).

During the national revival, in 1809 linguist and historian Josef Dobrovský released a German-language grammar of Old Czech entitled Ausführliches Lehrgebäude der böhmischen Sprache ('Comprehensive Doctrine of the Bohemian Language'). Dobrovský had intended his book to be descriptive, and did not think Czech had a realistic chance of returning as a major language. However, Josef Jungmann and other revivalists used Dobrovský's book to advocate for a Czech linguistic revival. Changes during this time included spelling reform (notably, í in place of the former j and j in place of g), the use of t (rather than ti) to end infinitive verbs and the non-capitalization of nouns (which had been a late borrowing from German). These changes differentiated Czech from Slovak. Modern scholars disagree about whether the conservative revivalists were motivated by nationalism or considered contemporary spoken Czech unsuitable for formal, widespread use.

Adherence to historical patterns was later relaxed and standard Czech adopted a number of features from Common Czech (a widespread informal interdialectal variety), such as leaving some proper nouns undeclined. This has resulted in a relatively high level of homogeneity among all varieties of the language.

== Geographic distribution ==
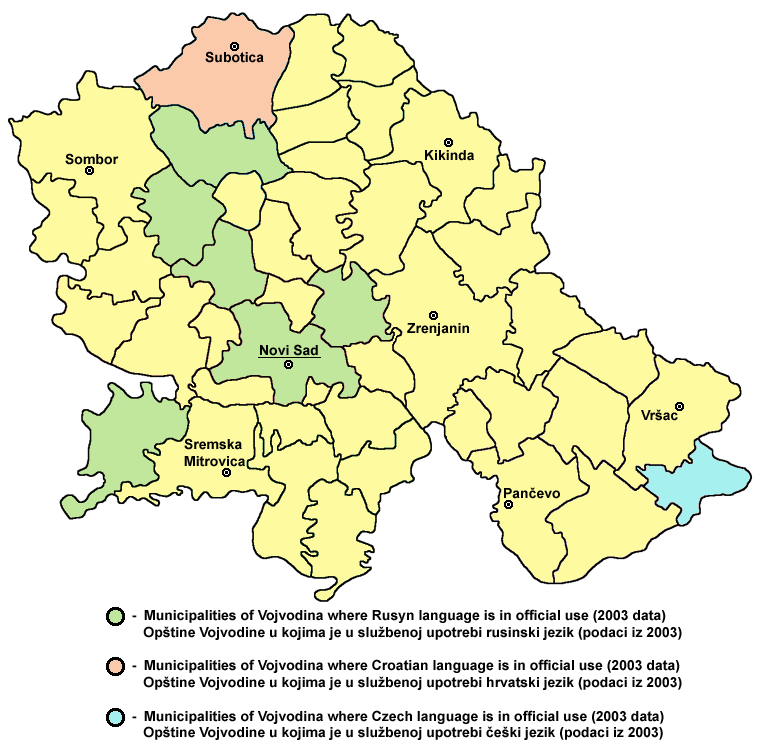
Official use of Czech in Vojvodina, Serbia (in light blue)

Czech is spoken by about 10 million residents of the Czech Republic. A Eurobarometer survey conducted from January to March 2012 found that the first language of 98 percent of Czech citizens was Czech, the third-highest proportion of a population in the European Union (behind Greece and Hungary).

As the official language of the Czech Republic (a member of the European Union since 2004), Czech is one of the EU's official languages and the 2012 Eurobarometer survey found that Czech was the foreign language most often used in Slovakia. Economist Jonathan van Parys collected data on language knowledge in Europe for the 2012 European Day of Languages. The five countries with the greatest use of Czech were the Czech Republic (98.77 percent), Slovakia (24.86 percent), Portugal (1.93 percent), Poland (0.98 percent) and Germany (0.47 percent).

Czech speakers in Slovakia primarily live in cities. Since it is a recognized minority language in Slovakia, Slovak citizens who speak only Czech may communicate with the government in their language in the same way that Slovak speakers in the Czech Republic also do.

=== Czech language being used in foreign areas ===
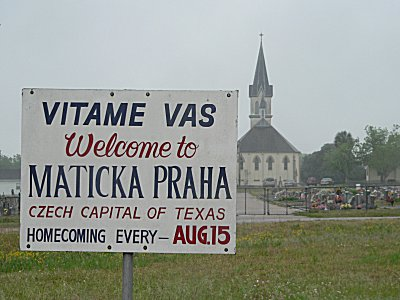
Praha, Texas (Note the absence of diacritics. In standard Czech, it would be Vítáme Vás […] Matička Praha.)

Immigration of Czechs from Europe to the United States occurred primarily from 1848 to 1914. Czech is a Less Commonly Taught Language in U.S. schools, and is taught at Czech heritage centers. Large communities of Czech Americans live in the states of Texas, Nebraska and Wisconsin. In the 2000 United States census, Czech was reported as the most common language spoken at home (including English) in Valley, Butler and Saunders Counties, Nebraska and Republic County, Kansas. With the exception of Spanish (the non-English language most commonly spoken at home nationwide), Czech was the most common home language in more than a dozen additional counties in Nebraska, Kansas, Texas, North Dakota and Minnesota. As of 2009, 70,500 Americans spoke Czech as their first language (49th place nationwide, after Turkish and before Swedish).

== Phonology ==
Spoken Czech (text reading)

=== Vowels ===
A Czech vowel chart

Standard Czech contains ten basic vowel phonemes, and three diphthongs. The vowels are /a/, /ɛ/, /ɪ/, /o/, and /u/, and their long counterparts /aː/, /ɛː/, /iː/, /oː/ and /uː/. The diphthongs are /ou̯/, /au̯/ and /ɛu̯/; the last two are found only in loanwords such as auto "car" and euro "euro".

In Czech orthography, the vowels are spelled as follows:

- Short: a, e/ě, i/y, o, u
- Long: á, é, í/ý, ó, ú/ů
- Diphthongs: ou, au, eu

The letter ⟨ě⟩ indicates that the previous consonant is palatalized (e.g. něco /ɲɛt͡so/). After a labial it represents /jɛ/ (e.g. běs /bjɛs/); but ⟨mě⟩ is pronounced /mɲɛ/, cf. měkký (/mɲɛkiː/).

=== Consonants ===
The consonant phonemes of Czech and their equivalent letters in Czech orthography are as follows:

		Labial	Alveolar	Post- alveolar	Palatal	Velar/Glottal
Nasal		m ⟨m⟩	n ⟨n⟩		ɲ ⟨ň⟩	
Plosive	voiceless	p ⟨p⟩	t ⟨t⟩		c ⟨ť⟩	k ⟨k⟩
Plosive	voiced	b ⟨b⟩	d ⟨d⟩		ɟ ⟨ď⟩	(ɡ) ⟨g⟩
Affricate	voiceless		t͡s ⟨c⟩	t͡ʃ ⟨č⟩		
Affricate	voiced		(d͡z)	(d͡ʒ)		
Fricative	voiceless	f ⟨f⟩	s ⟨s⟩	ʃ ⟨š⟩		x ⟨ch⟩
Fricative	voiced	v ⟨v⟩	z ⟨z⟩	ʒ ⟨ž⟩		ɦ ⟨h⟩
Trill	plain		r ⟨r⟩			
Trill	fricative		r̝ ⟨ř⟩			
Approximant			ɫ ⟨l⟩		j ⟨j⟩	

Czech consonants are categorized as "hard", "neutral", or "soft":

- Hard: /d/, /ɡ/, /ɦ/, /k/, /n/, /r/, /t/, /x/
- Neutral: /b/, /f/, /ɫ/, /m/, /p/, /s/, /v/, /z/
- Soft: /c/, /ɟ/, /j/, /ɲ/, /r̝/, /ʃ/, /t͡s/, /t͡ʃ/, /ʒ/

Hard consonants may not be followed by i or í in writing, or soft ones by y or ý (except in loanwords such as kilogram). Neutral consonants may take either character. Hard consonants are sometimes known as "strong", and soft ones as "weak". This distinction is also relevant to the declension patterns of nouns, which vary according to whether the final consonant of the noun stem is hard or soft.

Voiced consonants with unvoiced counterparts are unvoiced at the end of a word before a pause, and in consonant clusters voicing assimilation occurs, which matches voicing to the following consonant. The unvoiced counterpart of /ɦ/ is /x/.

The phoneme represented by the letter ř (capital Ř) is very rare among languages and often claimed to be unique to Czech, though it also occurs in some dialects of Kashubian, and formerly occurred in Polish. It represents the raised alveolar non-sonorant trill (IPA: [r̝]), a sound somewhere between Czech r and ž (example: "řeka" (river)), and is present in Dvořák. In unvoiced environments, /r̝/ is realized as its voiceless allophone [r̝̊], a sound somewhere between Czech r and š (example: přetřít, opravář).

The consonants /r/, /l/, and /m/ can be syllabic, acting as syllable nuclei in place of a vowel. Strč prst skrz krk ("Stick [your] finger through [your] throat") is a well-known Czech tongue twister using syllabic consonants but no vowels.

=== Stress ===
Each word has primary stress on its first syllable, except for enclitics (minor, monosyllabic, unstressed syllables). In all words of more than two syllables, every odd-numbered syllable receives secondary stress. Stress is unrelated to vowel length; both long and short vowels can be stressed or unstressed. Vowels are never reduced (e.g. to schwa sounds) when unstressed. When a noun is preceded by a monosyllabic preposition, the stress usually moves to the preposition, e.g. do Prahy "to Prague".

== Grammar ==
Czech grammar, like that of other Slavic languages, is fusional; its nouns, verbs, and adjectives are inflected by phonological processes to modify their meanings and grammatical functions, and the easily separable affixes characteristic of agglutinative languages are limited. Czech inflects for case, gender and number in nouns and tense, aspect, mood, person and subject number and gender in verbs.

Parts of speech include adjectives, adverbs, numbers, interrogative words, prepositions, conjunctions and interjections. Adverbs are primarily formed from adjectives by taking the final ý or í of the base form and replacing it with e, ě, y, or o. Negative statements are formed by adding the affix ne- to the main verb of a clause, with one exception: je (he, she or it is) becomes není.

=== Sentence and clause structure ===
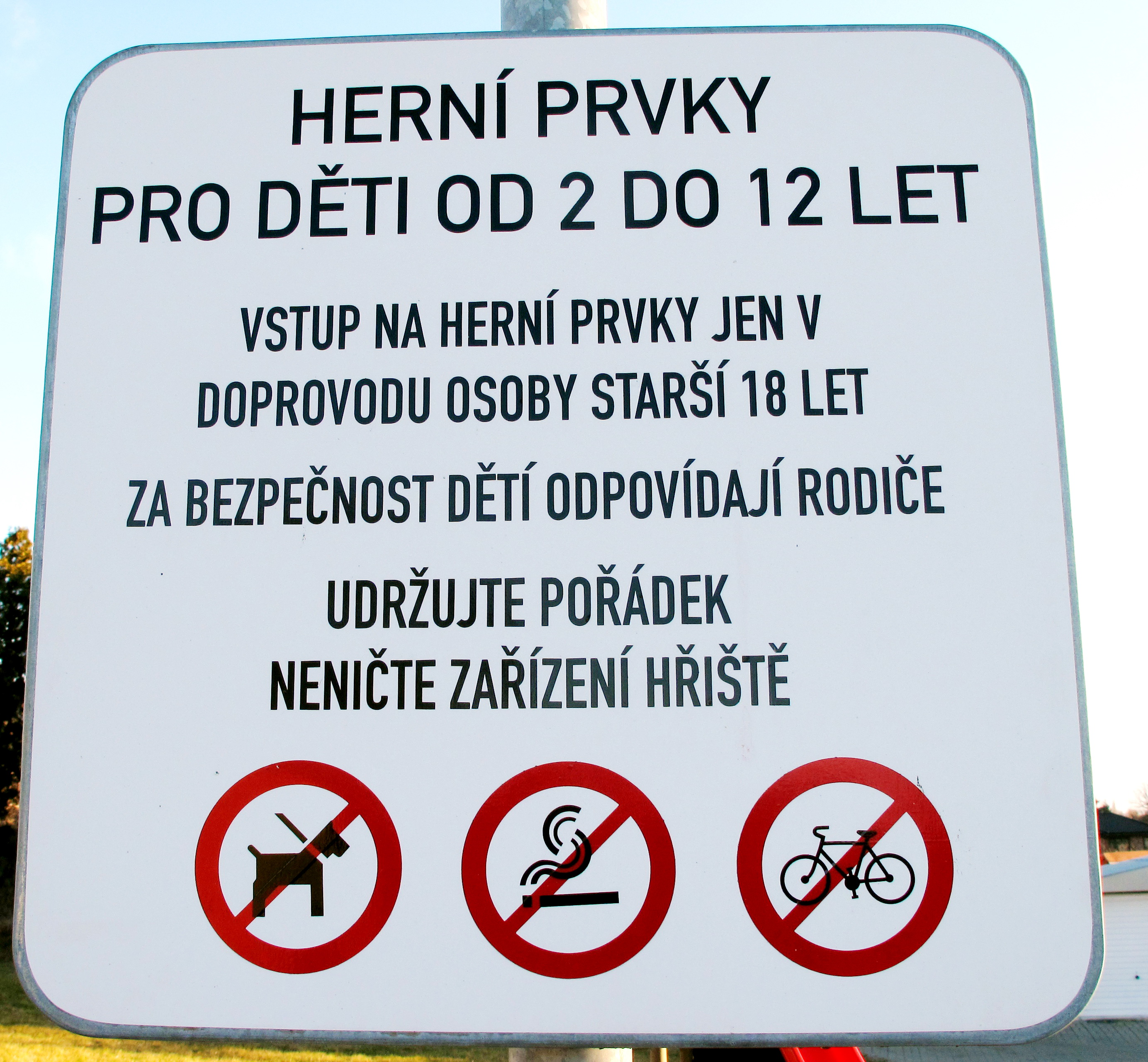
A Czech-language sign at the entrance to a children's playground

Czech pronouns, nominative case
Person	Singular	Plural
1st	já	my
2nd	ty vy (formal)	vy
3rd	on (masculine) ona (feminine) ono (neuter)	oni (masculine animate) ony (masculine inanimate, feminine) ona (neuter)

Because Czech uses grammatical case to convey word function in a sentence (instead of relying on word order, as English does), its word order is flexible. As a pro-drop language, in Czech an intransitive sentence can consist of only a verb; information about its subject is encoded in the verb. Enclitics (primarily auxiliary verbs and pronouns) appear in the second syntactic slot of a sentence, after the first stressed unit. The first slot can contain a subject or object, a main form of a verb, an adverb, or a conjunction (except for the light conjunctions a, "and", i, "and even" or ale, "but").

Czech syntax has a subject–verb–object sentence structure. In practice, however, word order is flexible and used to distinguish topic and focus, with the topic or theme (known referents) preceding the focus or rheme (new information) in a sentence; Czech has therefore been described as a topic-prominent language. Although Czech has a periphrastic passive construction (like English), in colloquial style, word-order changes frequently replace the passive voice. For example, to change "Peter killed Paul" to "Paul was killed by Peter" the order of subject and object is inverted: Petr zabil Pavla ("Peter killed Paul") becomes "Paul, Peter killed" (Pavla zabil Petr). Pavla is in the accusative case, the grammatical object of the verb.

A word at the end of a clause is typically emphasized, unless an upward intonation indicates that the sentence is a question:

- Pes jí bagetu. – The dog eats the baguette (rather than eating something else).
- Bagetu jí pes. – The dog eats the baguette (rather than someone else doing so).
- Pes bagetu jí. – The dog eats the baguette (rather than doing something else to it).
- Jí pes bagetu? – Does the dog eat the baguette? (emphasis ambiguous)

In parts of Bohemia (including Prague), questions such as Jí pes bagetu? without an interrogative word (such as co, "what" or kdo, "who") are intoned in a slow rise from low to high, quickly dropping to low on the last word or phrase.

In modern Czech syntax, adjectives precede nouns, with few exceptions. Relative clauses are introduced by relativizers such as the adjective který, analogous to the English relative pronouns "which", "that" and "who"/"whom". As with other adjectives, it agrees with its associated noun in gender, number and case. Relative clauses follow the noun they modify. The following is a glossed example:

Chc-i navštív-it universit-u, na kter-ou chod-í Jan.
want-1SG visit-INF university-SG.ACC, on which-SG.F.ACC attend-3SG John.SG.NOM
I want to visit the university that John attends.

=== Declension ===
In Czech, nouns and adjectives are declined into one of seven grammatical cases which indicate their function in a sentence, two numbers (singular and plural) and three genders (masculine, feminine and neuter). The masculine gender is further divided into animate and inanimate classes.

==== Case ====
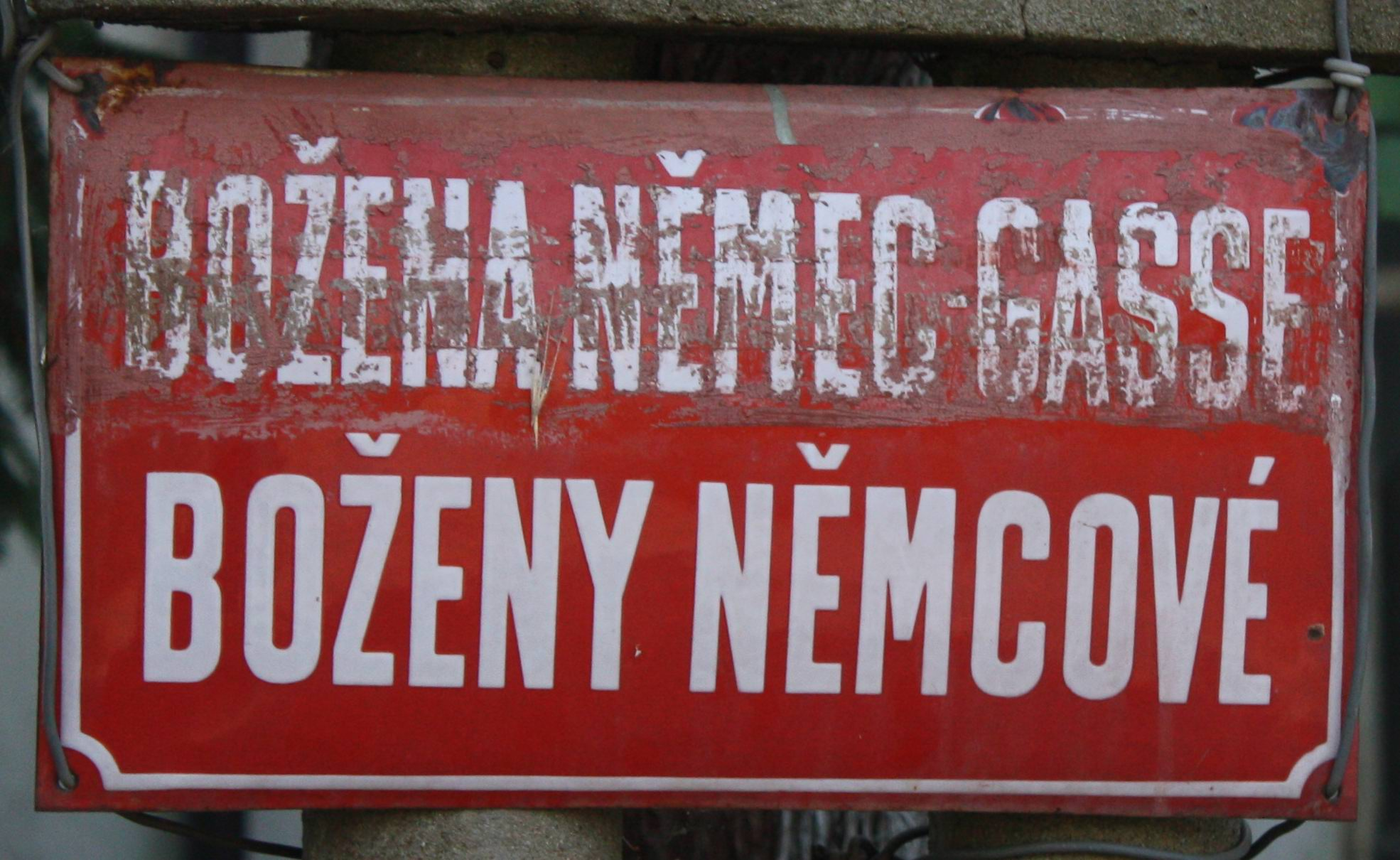
A street sign in German (top) and Czech (bottom) for a street named after Božena Němcová with her name declined in the genitive case in Czech (a sign probably from the time of the Protectorate)

A nominative–accusative language, Czech marks subject nouns of transitive and intransitive verbs in the nominative case, which is the form found in dictionaries, and direct objects of transitive verbs are declined in the accusative case. The vocative case is used to address people. The remaining cases (genitive, dative, locative and instrumental) indicate semantic relationships, such as noun adjuncts (genitive), indirect objects (dative), or agents in passive constructions (instrumental). Additionally prepositions and some verbs require their complements to be declined in a certain case. The locative case is only used after prepositions. An adjective's case agrees with that of the noun it modifies. When Czech children learn their language's declension patterns, the cases are referred to by number:

Cases in Czech
No.	Ordinal name (Czech)	Full name (Czech)	Case	Main usage
1.	první pád	nominativ	nominative	Subjects
2.	druhý pád	genitiv	genitive	Noun adjuncts, possession, prepositions of motion, time and location
3.	třetí pád	dativ	dative	Indirect objects, prepositions of motion
4.	čtvrtý pád	akuzativ	accusative	Direct objects, prepositions of motion and time
5.	pátý pád	vokativ	vocative	Addressing someone
6.	šestý pád	lokál	locative	Prepositions of location, time and topic
7.	sedmý pád	instrumentál	instrumental	Passive agents, instruments, prepositions of location

Some prepositions require the nouns they modify to take a particular case. The cases assigned by each preposition are based on the physical (or metaphorical) direction, or location, conveyed by it. For example, od (from, away from) and z (out of, off) assign the genitive case. Other prepositions take one of several cases, with their meaning dependent on the case; na means "on to" or "for" with the accusative case, but "on" with the locative.

This is a glossed example of a sentence using several cases:

Nes-l js-em krabic-i do dom-u se sv-ým přítel-em.
carry-SG.M.PST be-1.SG box-SG.ACC into house-SG.GEN with own-SG.INS friend-SG.INS
I carried the box into the house with my friend.

==== Gender ====
Czech distinguishes three genders—masculine, feminine, and neuter—and the masculine gender is subdivided into animate and inanimate. With few exceptions, feminine nouns in the nominative case end in -a, -e, or a consonant; neuter nouns in -o, -e, or -í, and masculine nouns in a consonant. Adjectives, participles, most pronouns, and the numbers "one" and "two" are marked for gender and agree with the gender of the noun they modify or refer to. Past tense verbs are also marked for gender, agreeing with the gender of the subject, e.g. dělal (he did, or made); dělala (she did, or made) and dělalo (it did, or made). Gender also plays a semantic role; most nouns that describe people and animals, including personal names, have separate masculine and feminine forms which are normally formed by adding a suffix to the stem, for example Čech (Czech man) has the feminine form Češka (Czech woman).

Nouns of different genders follow different declension patterns. Examples of declension patterns for noun phrases of various genders follow:

Case	Noun/adjective			
Case	Big dog (m. anim. sg.)	Black backpack (m. inanim. sg.)	Small cat (f. sg.)	Hard wood (n. sg.)
Nom.	velký pes (big dog)	černý batoh (black backpack)	malá kočka (small cat)	tvrdé dřevo (hard wood)
Gen.	bez velkého psa (without the big dog)	bez černého batohu (without the black backpack)	bez malé kočky (without the small cat)	bez tvrdého dřeva (without the hard wood)
Dat.	k velkému psovi (to the big dog)	k černému batohu (to the black backpack)	k malé kočce (to the small cat)	ke tvrdému dřevu (to the hard wood)
Acc.	vidím velkého psa (I see the big dog)	vidím černý batoh (I see the black backpack)	vidím malou kočku (I see the small cat)	vidím tvrdé dřevo (I see the hard wood)
Voc.	velký pse! (big dog!)	černý batohu! (black backpack!)	malá kočko! (small cat!)	tvrdé dřevo! (hard wood!)
Loc.	o velkém psovi (about the big dog)	o černém batohu (about the black backpack)	o malé kočce (about the small cat)	o tvrdém dřevě (about the hard wood)
Inst.	s velkým psem (with the big dog)	s černým batohem (with the black backpack)	s malou kočkou (with the small cat)	s tvrdým dřevem (with the hard wood)

==== Number ====
Nouns are also inflected for number, distinguishing between singular and plural. Typical of a Slavic language, Czech cardinal numbers one through four allow the nouns and adjectives they modify to take any case, but numbers over five require subject and direct object noun phrases to be declined in the genitive plural instead of the nominative or accusative, and when used as subjects these phrases take singular verbs. For example:

English	Czech
one Czech crown was...	jedna koruna česká byla...
two Czech crowns were...	dvě koruny české byly...
three Czech crowns were...	tři koruny české byly...
four Czech crowns were...	čtyři koruny české byly...
five Czech crowns were...	pět korun českých bylo...

Numbers decline for case, and the numbers one and two are also inflected for gender. Numbers one through five are shown below as examples. The number one has declension patterns identical to those of the demonstrative pronoun ten.

	1	2	3	4	5
Nominative	jeden (masc) jedna (fem) jedno (neut)	dva (masc) dvě (fem, neut)	tři	čtyři	pět
Genitive	jednoho (masc) jedné (fem) jednoho (neut)	dvou	tří or třech	čtyř or čtyřech	pěti
Dative	jednomu (masc) jedné (fem) jednomu (neut)	dvěma	třem	čtyřem	pěti
Accusative	jednoho (masc an.) jeden (masc in.) jednu (fem) jedno (neut)	dva (masc) dvě (fem, neut)	tři	čtyři	pět
Locative	jednom (masc) jedné (fem) jednom (neut)	dvou	třech	čtyřech	pěti
Instrumental	jedním (masc) jednou (fem) jedním (neut)	dvěma	třemi	čtyřmi	pěti

Although Czech's grammatical numbers are singular and plural, several residuals of dual forms remain, such as the words dva ("two") and oba ("both"), which decline the same way. Some nouns for paired body parts use a historical dual form to express plural in some cases: ruka (hand)—ruce (nominative); noha (leg)—nohama (instrumental), nohou (genitive/locative); oko (eye)—oči, and ucho (ear)—uši. While two of these nouns are neuter in their singular forms, all plural forms are considered feminine; their gender is relevant to their associated adjectives and verbs. These forms are plural semantically, used for any non-singular count, as in mezi čtyřma očima (face to face, lit. among four eyes). The plural number paradigms of these nouns are a mixture of historical dual and plural forms. For example, nohy (legs; nominative/accusative) is a standard plural form of this type of noun.

=== Verb conjugation ===
Czech verbs agree with their subjects in person (first, second or third), number (singular or plural), and in constructions involving participles, which includes the past tense, also in gender. They are conjugated for tense (past, present or future) and mood (indicative, imperative or conditional). For example, the conjugated verb mluvíme (we speak) is in the present tense and first-person plural; it is distinguished from other conjugations of the infinitive mluvit by its ending, -íme. The infinitive form of Czech verbs ends in -t (archaically, -ti or -ci). It is the form found in dictionaries and the form that follows auxiliary verbs (for example, můžu tě slyšet—"I can hear you").

==== Aspect ====
Typical of Slavic languages, Czech marks its verbs for one of two grammatical aspects: perfective and imperfective. Most verbs are part of inflected aspect pairs—for example, koupit (perfective) and kupovat (imperfective). Although the verbs' meaning is similar, in perfective verbs the action is completed and in imperfective verbs it is ongoing or repeated. This is distinct from past and present tense. Any verb of either aspect can be conjugated into either the past or present tense, but the future tense is only used with imperfective verbs. Aspect describes the state of the action at the time specified by the tense.

The verbs of most aspect pairs differ in one of two ways: by prefix or by suffix. In prefix pairs, the perfective verb has an added prefix—for example, the imperfective psát (to write, to be writing) compared with the perfective napsat (to write down). The most common prefixes are na-, o-, po-, s-, u-, vy-, z- and za-. In suffix pairs, a different infinitive ending is added to the perfective stem; for example, the perfective verbs koupit (to buy) and prodat (to sell) have the imperfective forms kupovat and prodávat. Imperfective verbs may undergo further morphology to make other imperfective verbs (iterative and frequentative forms), denoting repeated or regular action. The verb jít (to go) has the iterative form chodit (to go regularly) and the frequentative form chodívat (to go occasionally; to tend to go).

Many verbs have only one aspect, and verbs describing continual states of being—být (to be), chtít (to want), moct (to be able to), ležet (to lie down, to be lying down)—have no perfective form. Conversely, verbs describing immediate states of change—for example, otěhotnět (to become pregnant) and nadchnout se (to become enthusiastic)—have no imperfective aspect.

==== Tense ====
Conjugation of být in future tense
Person	Singular	Plural
1st	budu	budeme
2nd	budeš	budete
3rd	bude	budou

The present tense in Czech is formed by adding an ending that agrees with the person and number of the subject at the end of the verb stem. As Czech is a null-subject language, the subject pronoun can be omitted unless it is needed for clarity. The past tense is formed using a participle which ends in -l and a further ending which agrees with the gender and number of the subject. For the first and second persons, the auxiliary verb být conjugated in the present tense is added.

In some contexts, the present tense of perfective verbs (which differs from the English present perfect) implies future action; in others, it connotes habitual action. The perfective present is used to refer to completion of actions in the future and is distinguished from the imperfective future tense, which refers to actions that will be ongoing in the future. The future tense is regularly formed using the future conjugation of být (as shown in the table on the left) and the infinitive of an imperfective verb, for example, budu jíst—"I will eat" or "I will be eating". Where budu has a noun or adjective complement it means "I will be", for example, budu šťastný (I will be happy). Some verbs of movement form their future tense by adding the prefix po- to the present tense forms instead, e.g. jedu ("I go") > pojedu ("I will go").

==== Mood ====
Conditional form of koupit (to buy)
Person	Singular	Plural
1st	koupil/a bych	koupili/y bychom
2nd	koupil/a bys	koupili/y byste
3rd	koupil/a/o by	koupili/y/a by

Czech verbs have three grammatical moods: indicative, imperative and conditional. The imperative mood is formed by adding specific endings for each of three person–number categories: -Ø/-i/-ej for second-person singular, -te/-ete/-ejte for second-person plural and -me/-eme/-ejme for first-person plural. Imperatives are usually expressed using perfective verbs if positive and imperfective verbs if negative. The conditional mood is formed with a conditional auxiliary verb after the participle ending in -l which is used to form the past tense. This mood indicates hypothetical events and can also be used to express wishes.

==== Verb classes ====
Most Czech verbs fall into one of five classes, which determine their conjugation patterns. The future tense of být would be classified as a Class I verb because of its endings. Examples of the present tense of each class and some common irregular verbs follow in the tables below:

	Class I	Class II	Class III	Class IV	Class V
Definition	to carry	to print	to wander	to suffer	to do, to make
Infinitive	nést	tisknout	putovat	trpět	dělat
1st p. sg.	nesu	tisknu	putuji	trpím	dělám
2nd p. sg.	neseš	tiskneš	putuješ	trpíš	děláš
3rd p. sg.	nese	tiskne	putuje	trpí	dělá
1st p. pl.	neseme	tiskneme	putujeme	trpíme	děláme
2nd p. pl.	nesete	tisknete	putujete	trpíte	děláte
3rd p. pl.	nesou	tisknou	putují	trpí	dělají

Irregular verbs
Definition	to be	to want	to eat	to know
Infinitive	být	chtít	jíst	vědět
1st p. sg.	jsem	chci	jím	vím
2nd p. sg.	jsi	chceš	jíš	víš
3rd p. sg.	je	chce	jí	ví
1st p. pl.	jsme	chceme	jíme	víme
2nd p. pl.	jste	chcete	jíte	víte
3rd p. pl.	jsou	chtějí	jedí	vědí

== Orthography ==
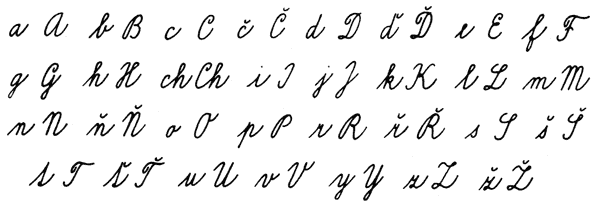
The handwritten Czech alphabet, without a Q, W and X

Czech has one of the most phonemic orthographies of all European languages. Its alphabet contains 42 graphemes, most of which correspond to individual phonemes, and only contains one digraph: ch, which follows h in the alphabet. The characters q, w and x appear only in foreign words. The háček (ˇ) is used with certain letters to form new characters: š, ž, and č, as well as ň, ě, ř, ť, and ď (the latter five uncommon outside Czech). The last two letters are sometimes written with a comma above (ʼ, an abbreviated háček) because of their height. Czech orthography has influenced the orthographies of other Balto-Slavic languages and some of its characters have been adopted for transliteration of Cyrillic.

Czech orthography reflects vowel length; long vowels are indicated by an acute accent or, in the case of the character ů, a ring. Long u is usually written ú at the beginning of a word or morpheme (úroda, neúrodný) and ů in the middle, except for loanwords (skútr) or onomatopoeia (bú). Long vowels and ě are not considered separate letters in the alphabetical order. The character ó exists only in loanwords and onomatopoeia.

Czech typographical features not associated with phonetics generally resemble those of most European languages that use the Latin script, including English. Proper nouns, honorifics, and the first letters of quotations are capitalized, and punctuation is typical of other Latin European languages. Ordinal numbers (1st) use a point, as in German (1.). The Czech language uses a decimal comma instead of a decimal point. When writing a long number, spaces between every three digits, including those in decimal places, may be used for better orientation in handwritten texts. The number 1,234,567.89101 may be written as 1234567,89101 or 1 234 567,891 01. In proper noun phrases (except personal and settlement names), only the first word and proper nouns inside such phrases are capitalized (Pražský hrad, Prague Castle).

== Varieties ==
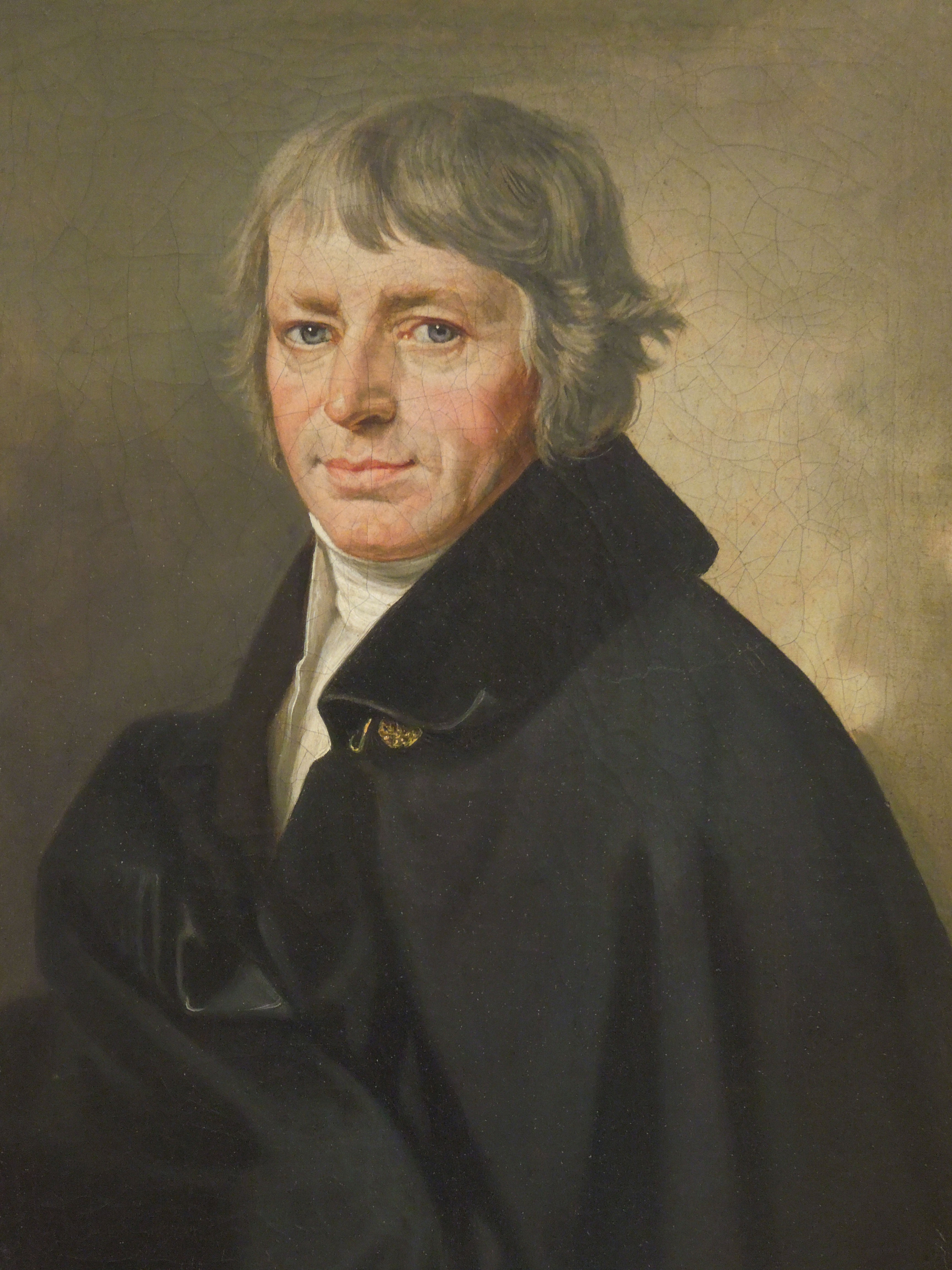
Josef Jungmann, whose Czech–German dictionary laid the foundations for modern Standard Czech

The modern literary standard and prestige variety, known as "Standard Czech" (spisovná čeština) is based on the standardization during the Czech National Revival in the 1830s, significantly influenced by Josef Jungmann's Czech–German dictionary published during 1834–1839. Jungmann used vocabulary of the Bible of Kralice (1579–1613) period and of the language used by his contemporaries. He borrowed words not present in Czech from other Slavic languages or created neologisms. Standard Czech is the formal register of the language which is used in official documents, formal literature, newspaper articles, education and occasionally public speeches. It is codified by the Czech Language Institute, who publish occasional reforms to the codification. The most recent reform took place in 1993. The term hovorová čeština (lit. 'Colloquial Czech') is sometimes used to refer to the spoken variety of standard Czech.

The most widely spoken vernacular form of the language is called "Common Czech" (obecná čeština), an interdialect influenced by spoken Standard Czech and the Central Bohemian dialects of the Prague region. Other Bohemian regional dialects have become marginalized, while Moravian dialects remain more widespread and diverse, with a political movement for Moravian linguistic revival active since the 1990s.

These varieties of the language (Standard Czech, spoken/colloquial Standard Czech, Common Czech, and regional dialects) form a stylistic continuum, in which contact between varieties of a similar prestige influences change within them.

=== Common Czech ===
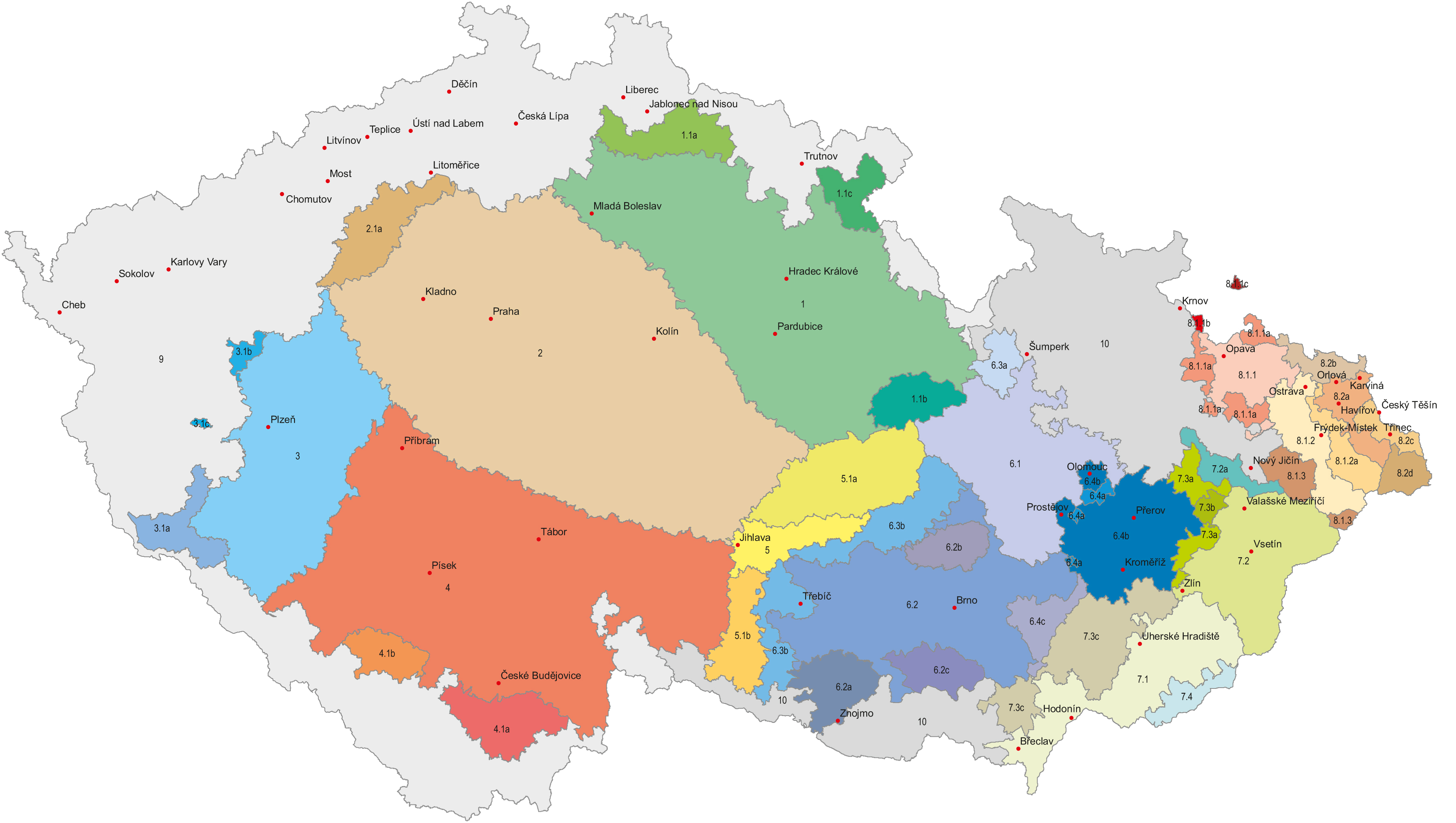
Dialects of Czech, Moravian, Lach, and Cieszyn Silesian spoken in the Czech Republic. The border areas, where German was formerly spoken, are now mixed.

The main Czech vernacular, spoken primarily in Bohemia including the capital Prague, is known as Common Czech (obecná čeština). This is an academic distinction; most Czechs are unaware of the term or associate it with deformed or "incorrect" Czech. Compared to Standard Czech, Common Czech is characterized by simpler inflection patterns and differences in sound distribution.

Common Czech is distinguished from spoken/colloquial Standard Czech (hovorová čeština), which is a stylistic variety within standard Czech. Tomasz Kamusella defines the spoken variety of Standard Czech as a compromise between Common Czech and the written standard, while Miroslav Komárek calls Common Czech an intersection of spoken Standard Czech and regional dialects.

Common Czech has become ubiquitous in most parts of the Czech Republic since the later 20th century. It is usually defined as an interdialect used in common speech in Bohemia and western parts of Moravia (by about two thirds of all inhabitants of the Czech Republic). Common Czech is not codified, but some of its elements have become adopted in the written standard. Since the second half of the 20th century, Common Czech elements have also been spreading to regions previously unaffected, as a consequence of media influence. Standard Czech is still the norm for politicians, businesspeople and other Czechs in formal situations, but Common Czech is gaining ground in journalism and the mass media. The colloquial form of Standard Czech finds limited use in daily communication due to the expansion of the Common Czech interdialect. It is sometimes defined as a theoretical construct rather than an actual tool of colloquial communication, since in casual contexts, the non-standard interdialect is preferred.

Common Czech phonology is based on that of the Central Bohemian dialect group, which has a slightly different set of vowel phonemes to Standard Czech. The phoneme /ɛː/ is peripheral and usually merges with /iː/, e.g. in malý město (small town), plamínek (little flame) and lítat (to fly), and a second native diphthong /ɛɪ̯/ occurs, usually in places where Standard Czech has /iː/, e.g. malej dům (small house), mlejn (mill), plejtvat (to waste), bejt (to be). In addition, a prothetic v- is added to most words beginning with o-, such as votevřít vokno (to open the window).

Non-standard morphological features that are more or less common among all Common Czech speakers include:

- unified plural endings of adjectives: malý lidi (small people), malý ženy (small women), malý města (small towns) – standard: malí lidé, malé ženy, malá města;
- unified instrumental ending -ma in plural: s těma dobrejma lidma, ženama, chlapama, městama (with the good people, women, guys, towns) – standard: s těmi dobrými lidmi, ženami, chlapy, městy. In essence, this form resembles the form of the dual, which was once a productive form, but now is almost extinct and retained in a lexically specific set of words. In Common Czech the ending became productive again around the 17th century, but used as a substitute for a regular plural form.
- omission of the syllabic -l in the masculine ending of past tense verbs: řek (he said), moh (he could), pích (he pricked) – standard: řekl, mohl, píchl.
- tendency of merging the locative singular masculine/neuter for adjectives with the instrumental by changing the locative ending -ém to -ým and then shortening the vowel: mladém (standard locative), mladým (standard instrumental) > mladým (Common Czech locative), mladym (Common Czech instrumental) > mladym (Common Czech locative/instrumental with shortening).

Examples of declension (Standard Czech is added in italics for comparison):

		Masculine animate	Masculine inanimate	Feminine	Neuter
Sg.	Nominative	mladej člověk mladý člověk	mladej stát mladý stát	mladá žena mladá žena	mladý zvíře mladé zvíře
Sg.	Genitive	mladýho člověka mladého člověka	mladýho státu mladého státu	mladý ženy mladé ženy	mladýho zvířete mladého zvířete
Sg.	Dative	mladýmu člověkovi mladému člověku	mladýmu státu mladému státu	mladý ženě mladé ženě	mladýmu zvířeti mladému zvířeti
Sg.	Accusative	mladýho člověka mladého člověka	mladej stát mladý stát	mladou ženu mladou ženu	mladý zvíře mladé zvíře
Sg.	Vocative	mladej člověče! mladý člověče!	mladej státe! mladý státe!	mladá ženo! mladá ženo!	mladý zvíře! mladé zvíře!
Sg.	Locative	mladým člověkovi mladém člověkovi	mladým státě mladém státě	mladý ženě mladé ženě	mladým zvířeti mladém zvířeti
Sg.	Instrumental	mladym člověkem mladým člověkem	mladym státem mladým státem	mladou ženou mladou ženou	mladym zvířetem mladým zvířetem
Pl.	Nominative	mladý lidi mladí lidé	mladý státy mladé státy	mladý ženy mladé ženy	mladý zvířata mladá zvířata
Pl.	Genitive	mladejch lidí mladých lidí	mladejch států mladých států	mladejch žen mladých žen	mladejch zvířat mladých zvířat
Pl.	Dative	mladejm lidem mladým lidem	mladejm státům mladým státům	mladejm ženám mladým ženám	mladejm zvířatům mladým zvířatům
Pl.	Accusative	mladý lidi mladé lidi	mladý státy mladé státy	mladý ženy mladé ženy	mladý zvířata mladá zvířata
Pl.	Vocative	mladý lidi! mladí lidé!	mladý státy! mladé státy!	mladý ženy! mladé ženy!	mladý zvířata! mladá zvířata!
Pl.	Locative	mladejch lidech mladých lidech	mladejch státech mladých státech	mladejch ženách mladých ženách	mladejch zvířatech mladých zvířatech
Pl.	Instrumental	mladejma lidma mladými lidmi	mladejma státama mladými státy	mladejma ženama mladými ženami	mladejma zvířatama mladými zvířaty

mladý člověk – young man/person, mladí lidé – young people, mladý stát – young state, mladá žena – young woman, mladé zvíře – young animal

=== Bohemian dialects ===
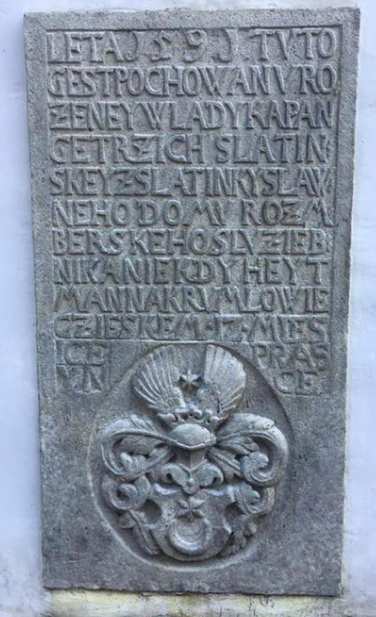
A headstone in Český Krumlov from 1591. The inscription features the distinctive Bohemian diphthong /ɛɪ̯/, spelled ⟨ey⟩.

Apart from the Common Czech vernacular, there remain a variety of other Bohemian dialects, mostly in marginal rural areas. Dialect use began to weaken in the second half of the 20th century, and by the early 1990s regional dialect use was stigmatized, associated with the shrinking lower class and used in literature or other media for comedic effect. Increased travel and media availability to dialect-speaking populations has encouraged them to shift to (or add to their own dialect) Standard Czech.

The Czech Statistical Office in 2003 recognized the following Bohemian dialects:

- Nářečí středočeská (Central Bohemian dialects)
- Nářečí jihozápadočeská (Southwestern Bohemian dialects)

- Podskupina chodská (Chod subgroup)
- Podskupina doudlebská (Doudleby subgroup)

- Nářečí severovýchodočeská (Northeastern Bohemian dialects)

- Podskupina podkrknošská (Krkonoše subgroup)

=== Moravian dialects ===
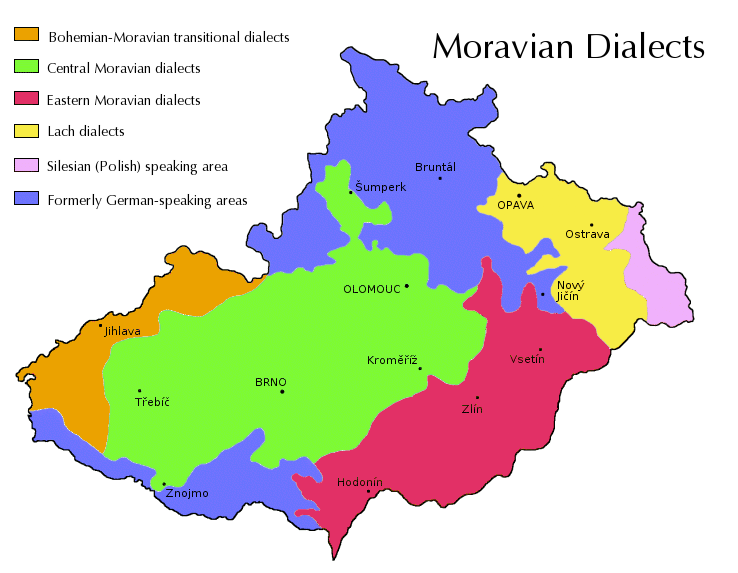
Traditional territory of the main dialect groups of Moravia and Czech Silesia. Green: Central Moravian, Red: East Moravian, Yellow: Lach (Silesian), Pink: Cieszyn Silesian, Orange: Bohemian–Moravian transitional dialects, Purple: Mixed areas

The Czech dialects spoken in Moravia and Silesia are known as Moravian (moravština). In the Austro-Hungarian Empire, "Bohemian-Moravian-Slovak" was a language citizens could register as speaking (with German, Polish and several others). In the 2011 census, where respondents could optionally specify up to two first languages, 62,908 Czech citizens specified Moravian as their first language and 45,561 specified both Moravian and Czech.

Beginning in the sixteenth century, some varieties of Czech resembled Slovak; the southeastern Moravian dialects form a continuum between the Czech and Slovak languages, using the same declension patterns for nouns and pronouns and the same verb conjugations as Slovak.

A popular misconception holds that eastern Moravian dialects are closer to Slovak than Czech, but this is incorrect; in fact, the opposite is true, and certain dialects in far western Slovakia exhibit features more akin to standard Czech than to standard Slovak.

The Czech Statistical Office in 2003 recognized the following Moravian dialects:

- Nářečí českomoravská (Bohemian–Moravian dialects)
- Nářečí středomoravská (Central Moravian dialects)

- Podskupina tišnovská (Tišnov subgroup)

- Nářečí východomoravská (Eastern Moravian dialects)

- Podskupina slovácká (Moravian Slovak subgroup)
- Podskupina valašská (Moravian Wallachian subgroup)

- Nářečí slezská (Silesian dialects)

=== Sample ===
In a 1964 textbook on Czech dialectology, Břetislav Koudela used the following sentence to highlight phonetic differences between dialects:

Standard Czech:	Dej mouku ze mlýna na vozík.
Common Czech:	Dej mouku ze mlejna na vozejk.
Central Moravian:	Dé móko ze mléna na vozék.
Eastern Moravian:	Daj múku ze młýna na vozík.
Silesian:	Daj muku ze młyna na vozik.
Slovak:	Daj múku z mlyna na vozík.
English:	Put the flour from the mill into the cart.

=== Mutual intelligibility with Slovak ===
Czech and Slovak have been considered mutually intelligible; speakers of either language can communicate with greater ease than those of any other pair of West Slavic languages. Following the 1993 dissolution of Czechoslovakia, mutual intelligibility declined for younger speakers, probably because Czech speakers began to experience less exposure to Slovak and vice versa. A 2015 study involving participants with a mean age of around 23 nonetheless concluded that there remained a high degree of mutual intelligibility between the two languages. Grammatically, both languages share a common syntax.

One study showed that Czech and Slovak lexicons differed by 80 percent, but this high percentage was found to stem primarily from differing orthographies and slight inconsistencies in morphological formation; Slovak morphology is more regular (when changing from the nominative to the locative case, Praha becomes Praze in Czech and Prahe in Slovak). The two lexicons are generally considered similar, with most differences found in colloquial vocabulary and some scientific terminology. Slovak has slightly more borrowed words than Czech.

The similarities between Czech and Slovak led to the languages being considered a single language by a group of 19th-century scholars who called themselves "Czechoslavs" (Čechoslované), believing that the peoples were connected in a way which excluded German Bohemians and (to a lesser extent) Hungarians and other Slavs. During the First Czechoslovak Republic (1918–1938), although "Czechoslovak" was designated as the republic's official language, both Czech and Slovak written standards were used. Standard written Slovak was partially modeled on literary Czech, and Czech was preferred for some official functions in the Slovak half of the republic. Czech influence on Slovak was protested by Slovak scholars, and when Slovakia broke off from Czechoslovakia in 1938 as the Slovak State (which then aligned with Nazi Germany in World War II), literary Slovak was deliberately distanced from Czech. When the Axis powers lost the war and Czechoslovakia reformed, Slovak developed somewhat on its own (with Czech influence); during the Prague Spring of 1968, Slovak gained independence from (and equality with) Czech, due to the transformation of Czechoslovakia from a unitary state to a federation. Since the dissolution of Czechoslovakia in 1993, "Czechoslovak" has referred to improvised pidgins of the languages which have arisen from the decrease in mutual intelligibility.

== Vocabulary ==
Czech vocabulary derives primarily from Slavic, Baltic and other Indo-European roots. Although most verbs have Balto-Slavic origins, pronouns, prepositions and some verbs have wider, Indo-European roots. Some loanwords have been restructured by folk etymology to resemble native Czech words (e.g. hřbitov, "graveyard" and listina, "list").

Most Czech loanwords originated in one of two time periods. Earlier loanwords, primarily from German, Greek and Latin, arrived before the Czech National Revival. More recent loanwords derive primarily from English and French, and also from Hebrew, Arabic and Persian. Many Russian loanwords, principally animal names and naval terms, also exist in Czech.

Although older German loanwords were colloquial, recent borrowings from other languages are associated with high culture. During the nineteenth century, words with Greek and Latin roots were rejected in favor of those based on older Czech words and common Slavic roots; "music" is muzyka in Polish and музыка (muzyka) in Russian, but in Czech it is hudba. Some Czech words have been borrowed as loanwords into English and other languages—for example, robot (from robota, "labor") and polka (from polka, "Polish woman" or from "půlka" "half").

== See also ==
- Czech Centers
- Czech name
- Czech Sign Language
- Swadesh list of Slavic words
