= Špillar =

Špillar (feminine: Špillarová) is a Czech surname. It was derived from the Middle High German word spilaere, meaning 'player'. Notable people with the surname include:

- Jaroslav Špillar (1869–1917), Czech painter
- Karel Špillar (1871–1939), Czech painter and graphic artist
- Katherine Spillar, American feminist and magazine editor
- Rudolf Vojtěch Špillar (1878–1949), Czech painter and photographer

== See also ==
- Spillars Cove, Trinity Bay, location in Canada
