= Karel Špillar =

Czech painter and graphic artist

- Born: 21 November 1871
- Died: 7 April 1939 (aged 67)
- Citizenship: Czech
- Occupations: painter and graphic artist

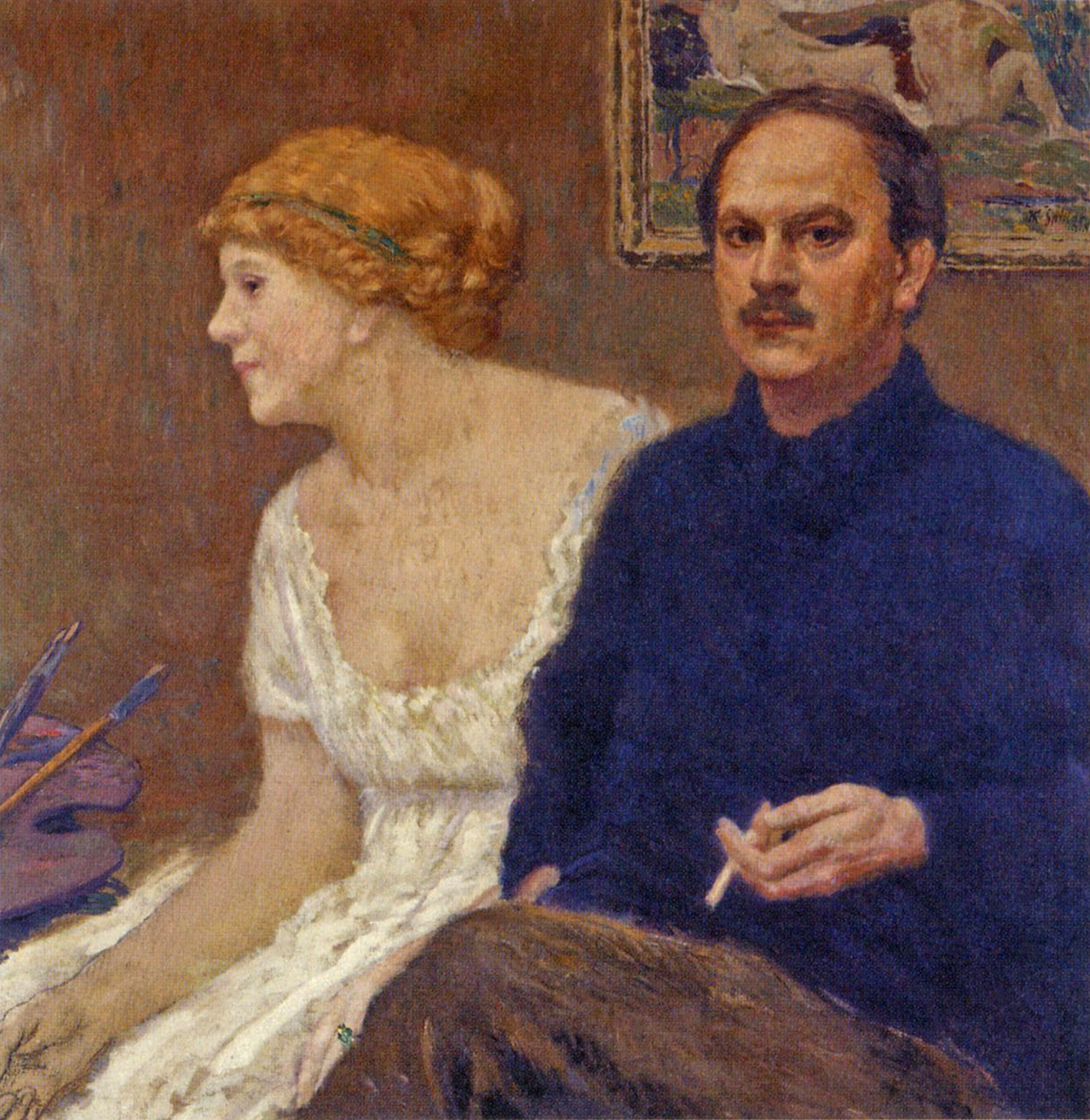
Self-portrait, with his wife

Karel Špillar (21 November 1871 – 7 April 1939) was a Czech painter and graphic artist.

== Biography ==
Karel Špillar was born on 21 November 1871 in Plzeň. His father, Antonín, was a financial officer for the city of Plzeň. His brothers, Jaroslav and Rudolf, also became painters. After completing his primary education, he became a student at the School of Applied Arts. From 1885 to 1893, he studied decorative painting with František Ženíšek, as did Jaroslav. Shortly after graduating, he received his first commission; An altarpiece for a chapel in Ostrava.

The following years were mostly devoted to small orders, but he returned to large decorative paintings in 1899, when he collaborated with Jan Preisler on panels for the pavilion of the Czech Chamber of Commerce at the upcoming Exposition Universelle in Paris. He worked with Preisler again, at the Central Hotel in Prague, then with Jaroslav in the meeting hall at the Italian Court in Kutná Hora (1901). During this time, he became an active member of the Mánes Union of Fine Arts. In 1902, he organized an exhibition for them in Paris and designed the posters.

He settled in Paris for a time, and made several trips to Normandy. There, he was influenced by the works of Puvis de Chavannes, which was reflected in his entry at a competition to design a new curtain for the Vinohrady Theatre in 1905. His design came in second place. He returned home in 1908, prompted by the death of his father and Jaroslav's worsening illness.

In 1909, he created one of his most prominent works, "Tribute to Prague", on the façade of the Municipal House. After 1913, he worked at the School of Applied Arts as a teacher of nude drawing. In 1925, he was appointed a Professor.

After Jaroslav's death in 1917, he spent his holidays at his brother's villa in Pec, sketching landscapes. He died on 7 April 1939 in Prague, after a long illness. He was interred at the Vinohrady Cemetery. His works were largely forgotten from 1948 to 1980, when a retrospective was held and interest in him was renewed.

== Selected paintings ==
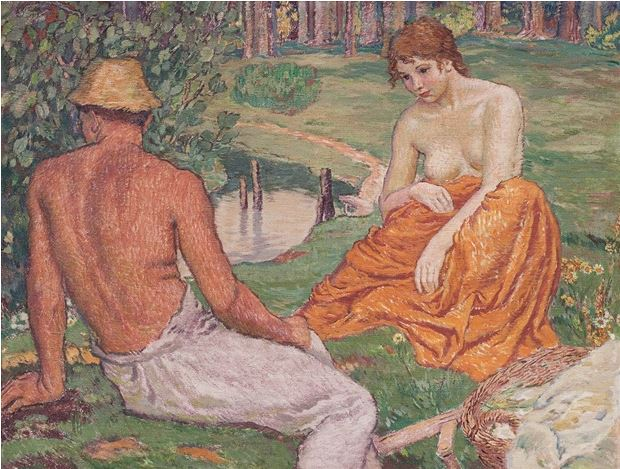
At Rest

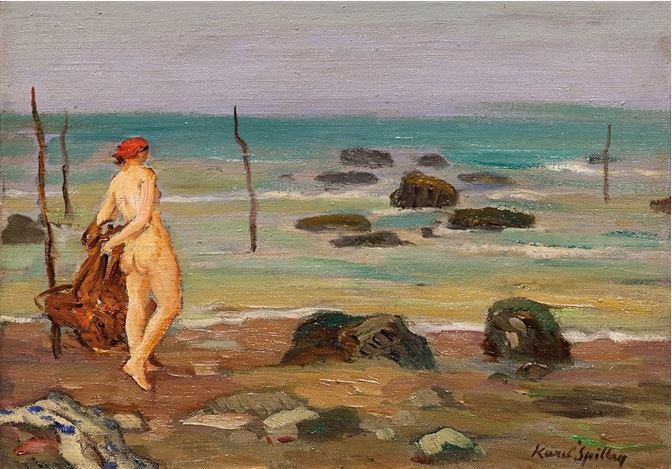
On the Beach

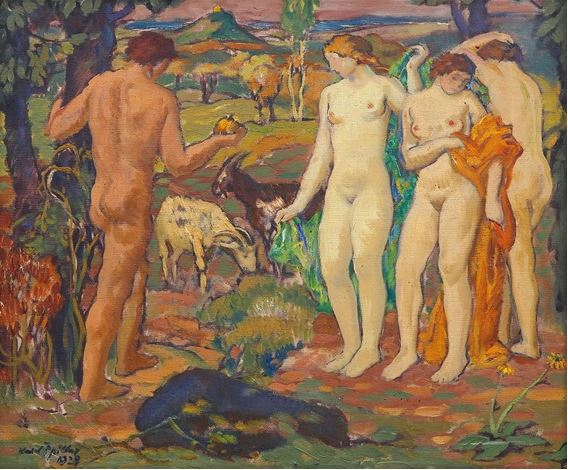
The Judgement of Paris

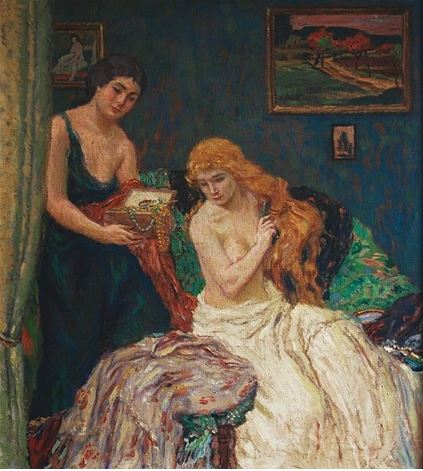
Dressing Up
