= Mánes Union of Fine Arts =

Czech art organization

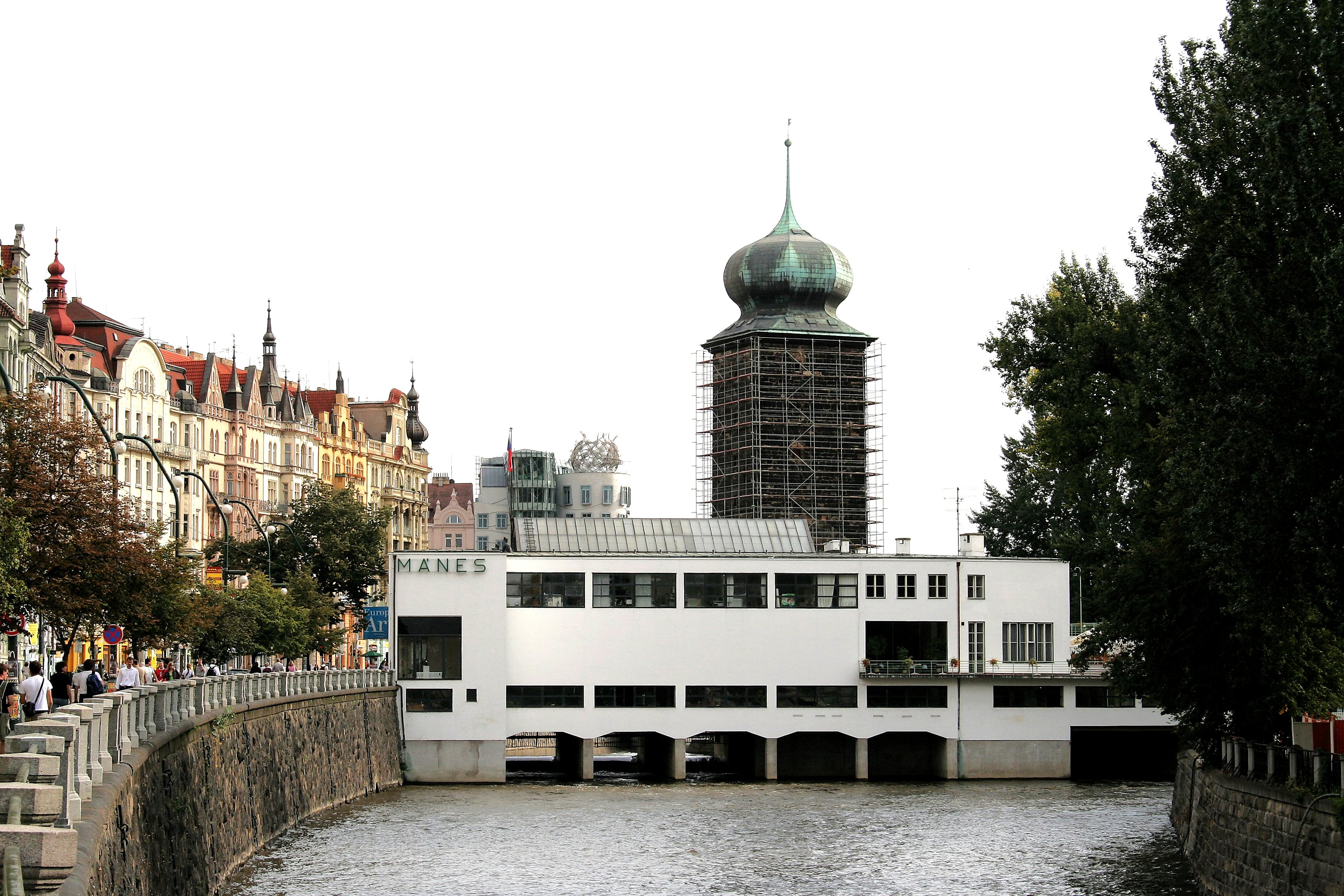
The Manes building.

The Mánes Association of Fine Artists (Czech: Spolek výtvarných umělců Mánes or S.V.U.; commonly abbreviated as Manes) was an artists' association and exhibition society founded in 1887 in Prague and named after painter Josef Mánes.

The Manes was significant for its international exhibitions before and after World War I that encouraged interaction between Czech artists and the foreign avant-garde. It played an important role in the development of Czech Cubism and Rondocubism. Between 1928 and 1930, Manes built a complex with a restaurant, club, showroom and offices at the site of the Štítkovský Mill and water tower on the Vltava. The architect of the 1928 Manes pavilion was member Otakar Novotný.

The union was liquidated under the Communists and was revived after the Velvet Revolution in 1990. Its headquarters became the Diamond House in Prague, itself a landmark of cubist architecture.

== Formative years (1885–1899) ==
Svaz výtvarných umělců Mánes ("Association of Fine Artists Mánes") was established in 1887 as a group of Bohemian artists in the Austrian-Hungarian Empire. Its forerunner was Škréta, spolek mladých českých výtvarníků v Mnichově ("Škréta, a Fellowship of Young Czech Artist in Munich"), an organization of Czech art students in Munich, an art center largely visited by Central and Eastern European art students. The name of this society came from seventeenth century Bohemian painter Karel Škréta. Formed in 1885 it became one of the largest communities of Czech students abroad. It had its own infrastructure and annual show. It had regular contact with the homeland and published a journal in two parts: Paleta & Špachtle ("Palette" and "Spatula"). This journal was circulated within the association only and all members had to contribute to it on weekly bases. Their focus was mainly on the German art scene. The group accepted other Slavic students as members.

The Škréta Fellowship renamed itself to Svaz výtvarných umělců Mánes (abb. SVU Mánes), after painter J. Mánes, who lived and worked in the first half of the nineteenth century in Czech Lands and Germany, and who attended the Munich Art Academy. Many founding members of the Škréta moved to Prague in 1887 – probably due to reforms at the Prague Art Academy – and finished their studies there. The Škréta Fellowship continued until its members Alfons Mucha and Luděk Marold left Munich for Paris.

Between 1885 and 1899 the focus was mainly on Palette and Spatula. Palette was a journal of art and literature and Spatula was a satirical magazine. These first fourteen years were the most important for the future development of modern Czech art scene. SVU Mánes took under its wings painting, sculpture and architecture. This notion was reflected in their emblem of three shields representing each the three art forms. The goals of SVU Mánes were mainly based on an old idea of patriotism with allegorical paintings from the Czech history, but they soon moved to modern art and its influx in Bohemia. One of the main differences from neighboring groups such as Munich and Viennese Secession was in their constant fight against pan-Germanism. One difference from Polish group Sztuka was in SVU Mánes' openness to the international art scene.

== Infrastructure ==
SVU Mánes averaged some 300 members between 1887 and 1899. It was a large organization for the Prague environment and for a secessionist group. Its first elected president was painter and illustrator Mikoláš Aleš, a (Aleš illustrated Old Czech manuscripts and was proclaimed by the critics as naïve, but SVU Mánes supported him and presented him with a diploma). Aleš, twenty years older than the rest of the members, had strong leadership and organization skills. Along with a sculptor, principal patron and chief organizer of SVU Mánes, Stanislav Sucharda, they formed a strong lead. The editorial board was elected annually. The first most influential editors were painter Karel Vítězslav and painter and draughtsman Jan Preisler. Probably the most important role in SVU Mánes had František Xaver Šalda, a journalist and an art critic.

== Notable members ==
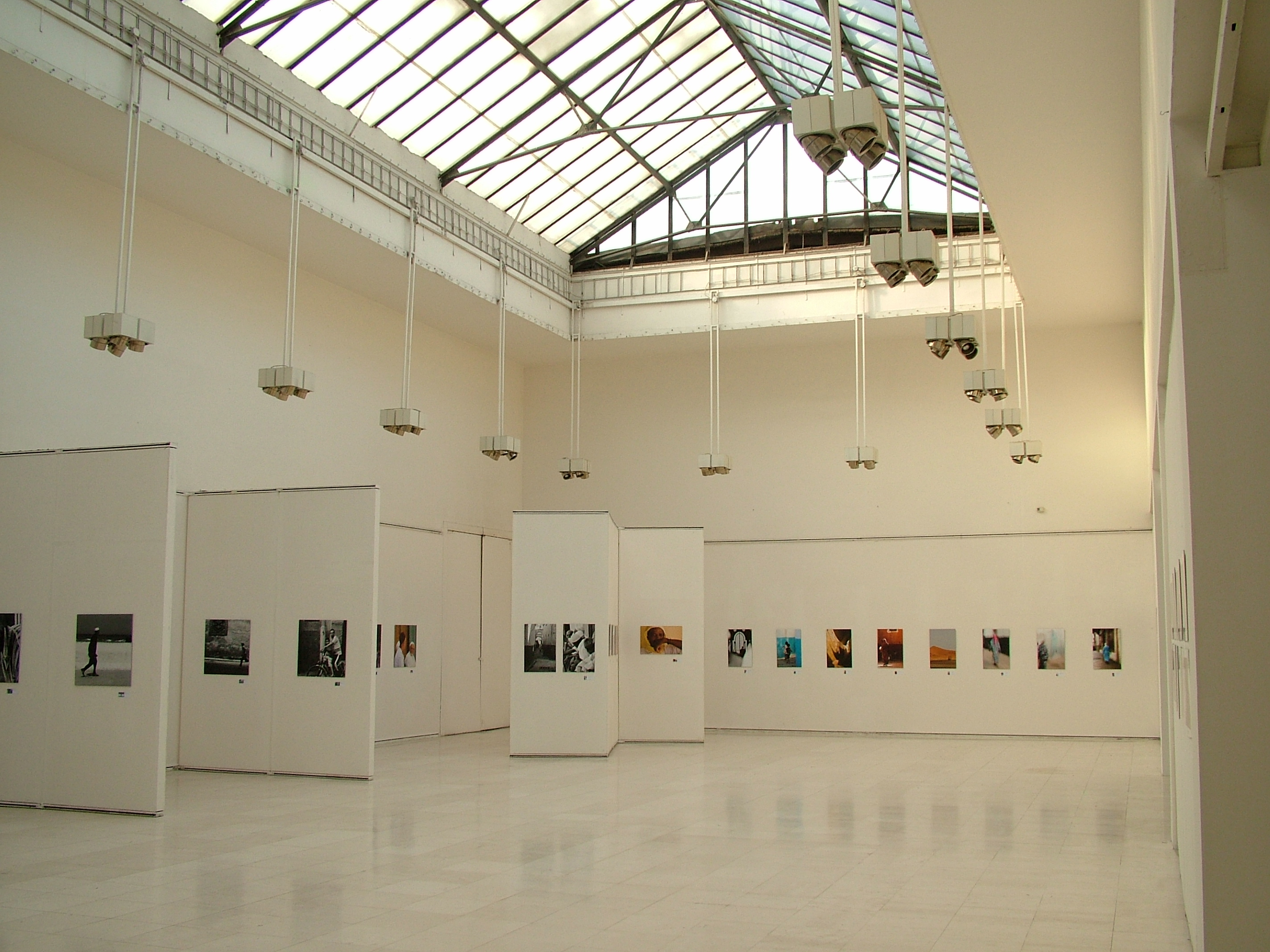
A 2012 exhibition at the Manes.

- Mikoláš Aleš, painter
- František Bílek, sculptor
- Josef Čapek, painter and writer
- Josef Chochol, architect
- Emil Filla, painter and sculptor
- Josef Gočár, architect
- Otto Gutfreund, sculptor
- Pavel Janák, architect
- Jan Kotěra, architect
- Otakar Novotný, architect
- Eduard Ovčáček, lettrist and graphic artist
- Jože Plečnik, architect
- Karel Svolinský, painter
- Max Švabinský, painter
- Jan Švankmajer, animator
- Jiřina Žertová, sculptor and painter
- Anna Masaryková, art historian

== Evolution of secession in Prague ==
SVU Mánes rebelled against the old and rigid system of art exhibitions, art politics and pan-Germanism of art in Czech. Multiple events helped the patriotic SVU Mánes to achieve its success before their first exhibition in 1898.

- Jubilejní Výstava Jubilee Exposition in Prague in 1891 included an art exhibition.
- In 1893 student political party Omladina [The Youth] was established looking for autonomy from the Empire.
- In 1893 Czech artists published a petition in general newspapers. They appealed to citizens to support Czech art by commissions and visitations of Czech art exhibitions.
- In 1895 the Manifest of Czech Modernism was published, signed mainly by writers and critics (including F. X. Šalda). It proclaimed neutrality in politics and humanist ideals. They were interested in Czech history, in feminist issues and individualism even in politics. Mánes was their great example.
- A book by Tomáš Garrigue Masaryk (future first president of Czechoslovakia) Česká otázka (Czech Question) whose focus was the nation’s evolution based on humanist principles, solution of social problems and anti-Semitism. Masaryk compared Czech history with the world’s historical evolution.
- The first Czech art exhibition in Topič salon produced a promotional poster by Viktor Oliva that was the first Bohemian poster exhibited internationally.
- In 1897, Rudolfínum (an equivalent to Parisian Salon) exhibited 950 works of art and received mocking reviews of a tasteless and overcrowded installation.
- In 1898 Czech language decrees (attempt to promote Czech as an equal language to German) reached their height with victory for Czechs. The Austrian government in Prague fell. The national celebration was visible in an annual exhibition of the German Art Union trying to exhibit a painting by Franz von Lenbach Theodor Mommsen. Mommsen was a German historian who the Czech public viewed as a great chauvinist. The reaction against this painting by the Czech audience caused the painting’s removal to protect it. This was followed by an appeal in newspapers for artists to leave the German Art Union and to boycott this show.
- In 1898, SVU Mánes exhibited its first group show.

== Important exhibitions ==
=== 1897-98 ===
In 1897, SVU Mánes opened its first preliminary exhibition of competing posters. These were designed for its first exhibition the following year.

SVU Mánes' first exhibition was 5 February to 5 March in 1898 in Topič salon (a commercial gallery in the center) in Prague. With this exhibition, SVU Mánes proclaimed its secession. Thirty participants among the eighty members with landscapes dominating the show. The installation was similar to that in Rudolfínum, but many fewer works were selected.

On 3 November another exhibition was held in the same location, exhibiting fifty works from artists Joža Uprka, František Bílek, Zdenka Braunerová, Antonín Hudeček and Antonín Slavíček. With this exhibition, the members refused Rudolfínum as an exhibiting society, and stepped toward their own exhibiting building. This exhibition went up during the same time of preparation of the first exhibition of the Viennese Secession with which they had a competitive relationship. SVU Mánes show attracted members of Viennese society, who offered participation to Czech painters to exhibit in Vienna. František Bílek agreed, while Stanislav Sucharda refused absent an autonomous Czech show in Vienna.

=== 1899-1900 ===
In 1899, SVU Mánes began organizing traveling exhibitions in other towns of Bohemia and Moravia to increase public awareness.

In 1900 SVU Mánes exhibited in Viennese Künstlerhaus.

Also in 1900, SVU Mánes opened its third exhibition, showing sixty works in the Topič salon. KU Ministerium supported this show. It toured Brno and Vienna, getting more credit on its home soil as a competitor to Rudolfínum, but it brought new audiences and recognition in the international press. Among the exhibiting artists was Jan Preisler with his The Wind and Breeze, František Bílek, who caused surprise and František Kupka. After this exhibition, Antonín Slavíček and Maxmilián Švabinský (The Poor Country) were invited to Miethke gallery in Vienna and Švabinský became the most exportable Bohemian artist. For the first time, SVU Mánes’ exhibition had a designer in architect Jan Kotěra who focused on simplicity and purity with respect to painting, sculpture and prints. This differed from the over-crowdedness of Rudolfínum and the over-ornamentation of the Viennese Secession. Sculptures were not for decoration but they were installed as autonomous art works.

=== 1902 ===
In 1902, SVU Mánes exhibited in Hagenbund, which became its frequent host.

After a visit to Paris Exposition of 1900, Alfons Mucha and Josef Mařatka invited sculptor Auguste Rodin to exhibit his works in Prague. This event took place in Manes’ new exhibiting building, the Mánes Pavilion in 1902, designed by Jan Kotěra. Kotěra took on an idea of Paradise with each sculpture displayed in its own space, not competing with the others, with floors covered with gravel and shrubs expanding the garden theme. This show utterly overshadowed Rudolfínum, making SVU Mánes the main exhibiting body in Bohemia. The exhibition also increased public interest in foreign art. Rodin influenced artists such as Sucharda, Ladislav Šaloun and Bohumil Kafka. This show had a political background of Czech intellectuals looking toward France, appealing to French republican artistic freedom. Rodin showed eighty sculptures and seventy drawings. His sculptures revealing intimate bodily details, sexuality and psychological expression, was new to Prague. He was taken as a genius by artists and critics, who appealed for Czech artists to follow his path by looking to themselves. This exhibition had a further impact on Austria and Germany. After Prague, Rodin took some of his pieces to Vienna. This show made Prague an international exhibiting city.

Following Rodin’s exhibition, SVU Mánes presented a retrospective of contemporary French painting the Nabis who Czech artists knew since the 1890s from their Parisian visits for their freedom of form and deliberate experiments.

Another exhibit presented works of Mikolaš Aleš, Hudeček and French graphic arts.

The year's last exhibition was a visiting show in Kraków hosted by Sztuka. Among the 132 Czech artists who exhibited there, belonged František Bílek, Sucharda, Kafka, Šaloun, Joža Úprka, Maxmilián Švabinský, Alois Kalvoda, Antonín Slavíček, František Kupka and others.

=== 1903 ===
A similar exhibition opened in 1903 in the Mánes Pavilion, surveying Czech art production, followed by a retrospective of Josef Mánes. He was the only non-contemporary artist exhibited in SVU Mánes.

An exhibition of Worpswede continued SVU Mánes’ interest in international art scene along with another show of Croatian contemporary art of Družstvo umjetnosti [Association of Art].

=== 1904 ===
Returning to the domestic art scene, SVU Mánes hosted a retrospective of Joža Úprka.

SVU Mánes members had their first group show in their new building, followed by a group show of Antonín Slavíček, Bohumil Kafka, Josef Mařatka, Stanislav Sucharda and Ladislav Šaloun.

=== 1905 ===
SVU Mánes presented an exhibition of Edvard Munch.

Following Munch show was another group exhibition and after that an exhibition of T. F. Simon.

In the winter of 1905-06, SVU Mánes hosted Danish artists.

=== 1906-07 ===
1906 brought an exhibition of N. K. Roerich along with Francisco Goya and another member show.

The following year Henri le Sidaner together with Louis Dejean exhibited. After that, French Impressionism occupied the Mánes Pavilion.

Members and architects established Sdružení architektů Mánese [Association of Mánes’ Architects] that, a year later, began publishing its journal Styl [Style] concentrating on contemporary art and design.

At the turn of 1907 and 1908, English etchings arrived to Prague under the SVU Mánes’ umbrella.

=== 1908-10 ===
Auguste Rodin together with Ludwig v. Hofmann exhibited in 1908, followed by SVU Mánes’ group show.

Émile Bernard; E. A. Bourdelle; SVU Mánes’ group show came in 1909.

In 1910 SVU Mánes’ presented a group show of sketches: Les Independents; Slavíček; Axel Gellen-Kellela; Munch; and Swedish Art.

== Impact of Munch Show ==
When SVU Mánes presented Edvard Munch, the audience was shocked. This artist had an immense impact on the future development of modern art in Bohemia. No other show divided Czech artists as much. The artist community fell into two hostile camps. In 1907, eight art students formed "Osma" [The Eight], finding SVU Mánes too provincial.

F. X. Šalda was the only critic who agreed with the new group. The main two members of Osma were Bohumil Kubišta and Emil Filla. Kubišta responded with Night of Love in 1908 and Filla with Reader of Dostoevsky in 1907. Jan Preisler was the only SVU Mánes member who responded to Munch with his painting Woman by a Lake, however after harsh criticism he abandoned this style. Criticism of Preisler’s work angered Osma even more.

== 1912–1914: Cubist schism ==
In 1912, SVU Mánes split, following the Cubist art scene in Paris: the Montmartre Cubism of Pablo Picasso and Georges Braque, and Section d'Or Cubism led by Albert Gleizes and Jean Metzinger. Prague's key followers of Montmartre Cubism in Prague were artists Emil Filla and Otto Gutfreund, while the nucleus of the opposing camp was created around the Čapek brothers. Bohemian Cubists combined Cubism with Expressionism, some with Futurism, Orphism and Rayonism, while others concentrated on national or existential subject matters. The artists influenced by Montmartre Cubism established Skupina výtvarných umelců [Group of Artists].

== Volné Směry journal ==
Volné Směry (Free Currents) was a journal of SVU Mánes first published in 1896. At first the association oriented its journal mainly toward literature, another driving force behind the Czech secessionist movement. Association members competed in its pages. The journal worked as a Gesamtkunstwerk [total work of art]. The editors also included information about international and domestic art scene and art criticism.

In 1902, installation designs began to appear. The journal competed mainly with Ver Sacrum of the Viennese Secession in content and form. At this point, its primary goal was promotion of Czech art along with introduction and commentary on the international art scene. Its funding came at first from members. The main editors were Vojtěch Preisler and Arnošt Hofbauer. Volné směry reached a wide public, with coverage better than its main competitor journal Moderní revue [Modern Review]. Other competing journals in Czech at the time were: L’Art, L'Art et industrie, Gazette des Beaux-Arts, Revue des Arts Decoratifs, La Plume, L’ Art et les artistes, The Art Amateur, Art Journal, Art Pictorial & Industrial, The Studio, Formenschatz, Dekorative Kunst, Die Kunst, Deutsche Kunst und Dekoration, Kunst und Handwerk, Skulpturenschatz, Zeitschrift für Bildende Kunst and Die Graphischen Kunste. In 1897, in its second volume, a special issue was dedicated to regionalist painter Úprka.

A year later, Kotěra published an essay to appeal to Czech citizens to think for themselves when looking at art and architecture. He stated that Czech art and architecture should be Czech, with Czech form, using local materials and technologies. Form should reflect modern times and should not mimic foreign art and architecture. Kotěra used a universal and pragmatic tone in his essay, without providing a definition of the Czech form. Open debates in Volné směry and other journals considered the planned destruction of Prague’s historical center.

In 1899, a special issue was dedicated to symbolist sculptor František Bílek. In the same year, Kotěra became one of the main editors and a professor of University of Architecture and Applied Arts in Prague. He studied directly under Otto Wagner in Vienna. At the turn of the century, a special issue devoted to the Third SVU Mánes exhibition was produced for the first time for Viennese audiences. The Rodin show was accompanied by a special double-issue dedicated to the sculptor in 1901, a year before its opening. By 1903, the journal established a comfortable position financially with approximately 1800 subscribing readers.

== Mánes Pavilion ==
In 1902 Kotěra designed the Mánes Pavilion for the Rodin exhibition. It was supposed to be only a temporary building, erected in four weeks. The pavilion was functional and flexible. Lit from the top, it had movable walls and Karel Špillar adorned it with a patriotic Slavic wooden lintel and allegorical mosaic. Manes used it until 1914. Its location was near the city center, close to a space where Prague officials wanted to build a modern gallery.

== Sources ==
- Elizabeth Clegg (2006). Art, Design, and Architecture in Central Europe, 1890-1920. Yale University Press. ISBN 978-0-300-11120-0.
- Krzysztofowics-Kozakowska, Stefania. “ Sztuka – Wiener Secession – Manes. The Central European Art Triangle.” Artibus et Historiae 53 (2006): 217-259.
- Lahoda, Vojtech, Mahulena Neslehova, Marie Platovska, Rostislav Svacha and Lenka Bydzovska, eds. Dejiny ceskeho vytvarneho umeni (IV/1, IV/2) 1890-1938. Prague: Ustav dejin umeni AV CR Academia, 1998.
