= Jaroslav Špillar =

Czech artist (1869–1917)

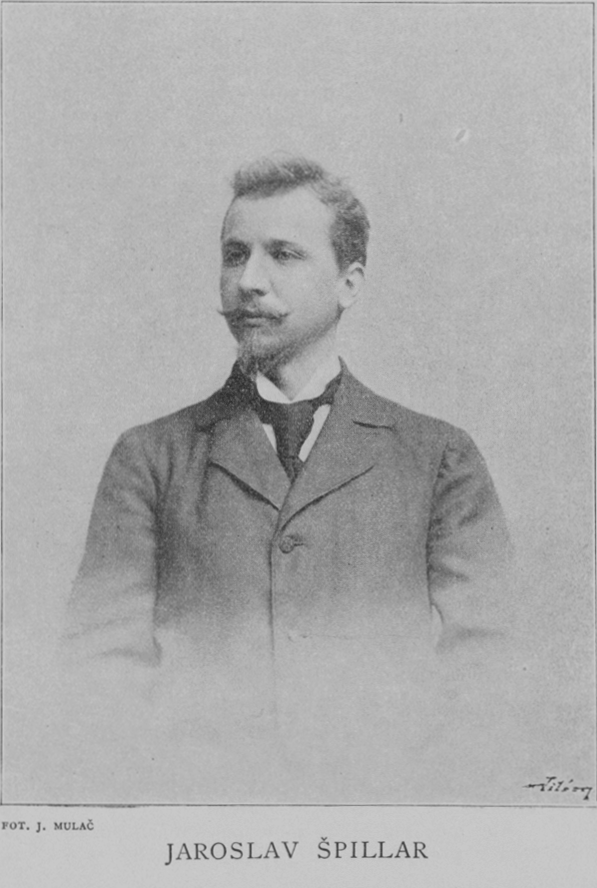
Jaroslav Špillar (1899), photographed by Jan Mulač

Jaroslav Špillar (11 October 1869 – 20 November 1917) was a Czech artist who specialized in painting the Chodové ("Rangers").

== Life ==
Špillar was born on 11 October 1869 in Plzeň. He was the son of a financial officer. His brothers Karel and Rudolf also became artists. In 1885, he became one of the first students at the School of Applied Arts in Prague, where he studied under František Ženíšek and Jakub Schikaneder. He then spent five years at the Academy of Fine Arts with Maxmilián Pirner. This was followed by the traditional study trip to Italy, as well as several other places abroad.

By 1888, Špillar had become interested in the Chod region and settled there in 1891. At first, he lived in Postřekov, then moved to the small village of Trávniky, where the local residents gave him the nickname Trávníček. Later (in 1902), he built a villa in Pec where he hosted many celebrities. Alfons Mucha spent his honeymoon there in 1906.

In 1904, Špillar began to display signs of a serious mental disorder and was eventually committed to a psychiatric hospital in Dobřany, where he died on 20 November 1917. Most of his paintings and other ethnographic materials are kept in the Špillar Brothers Gallery at the Muzeum Chodska in Domažlice.

== Selected paintings ==
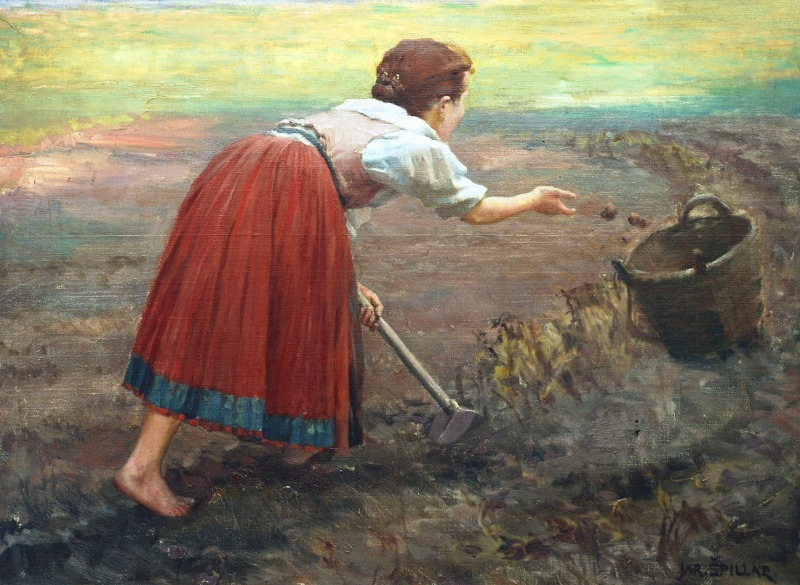
Harvesting Potatoes (1900)

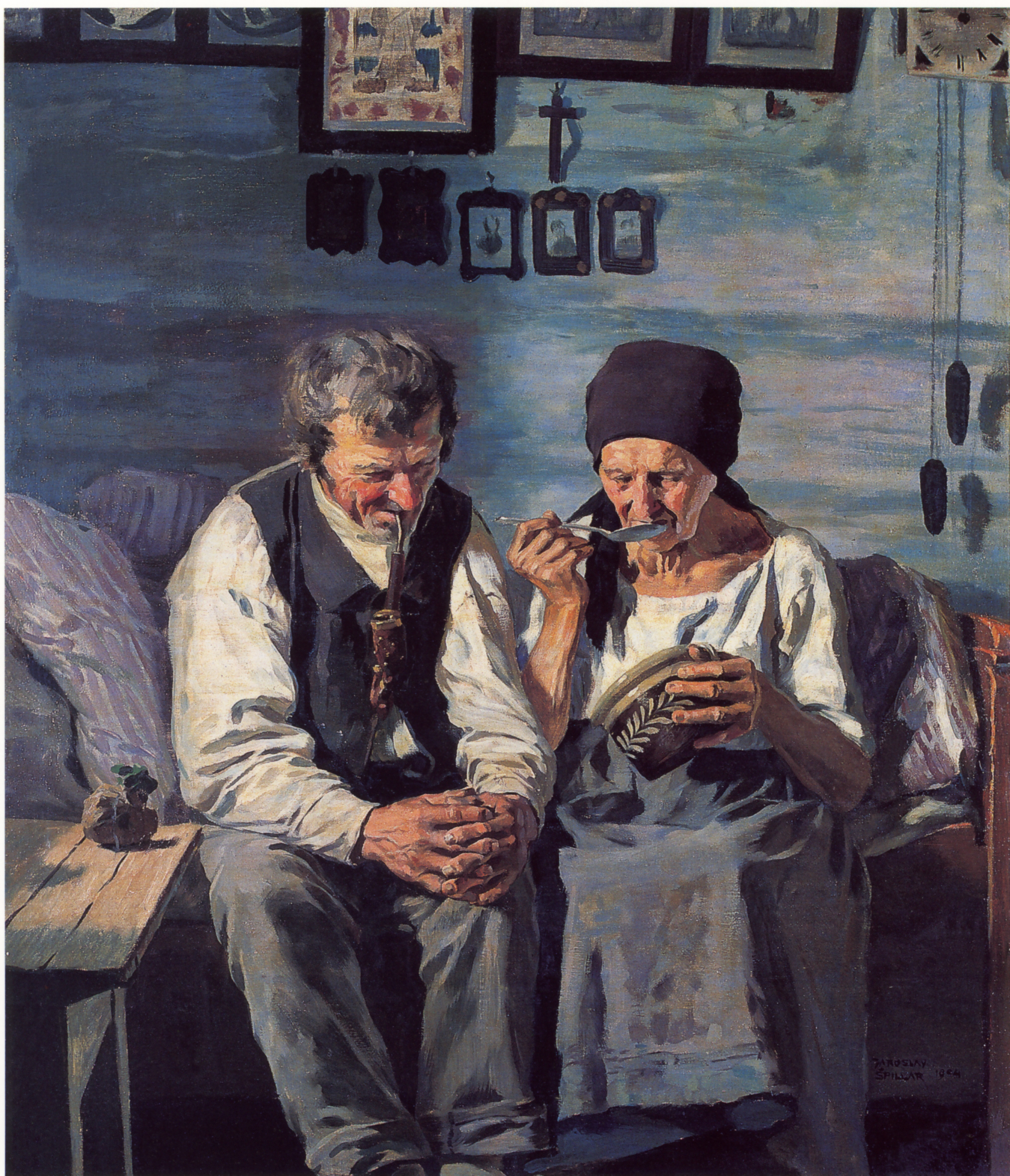
Elderly Couple (1904)

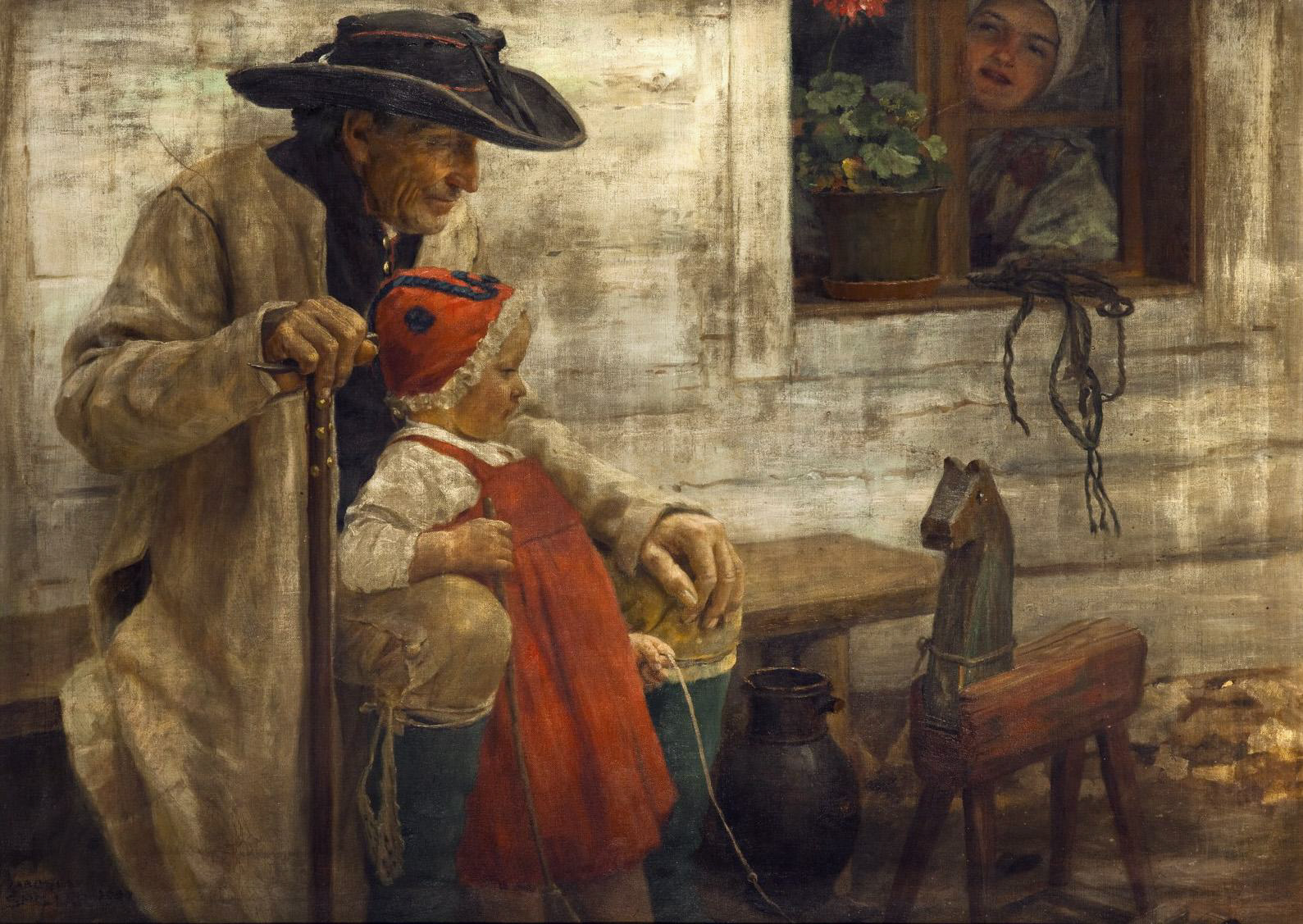
Chodové Family (1900)

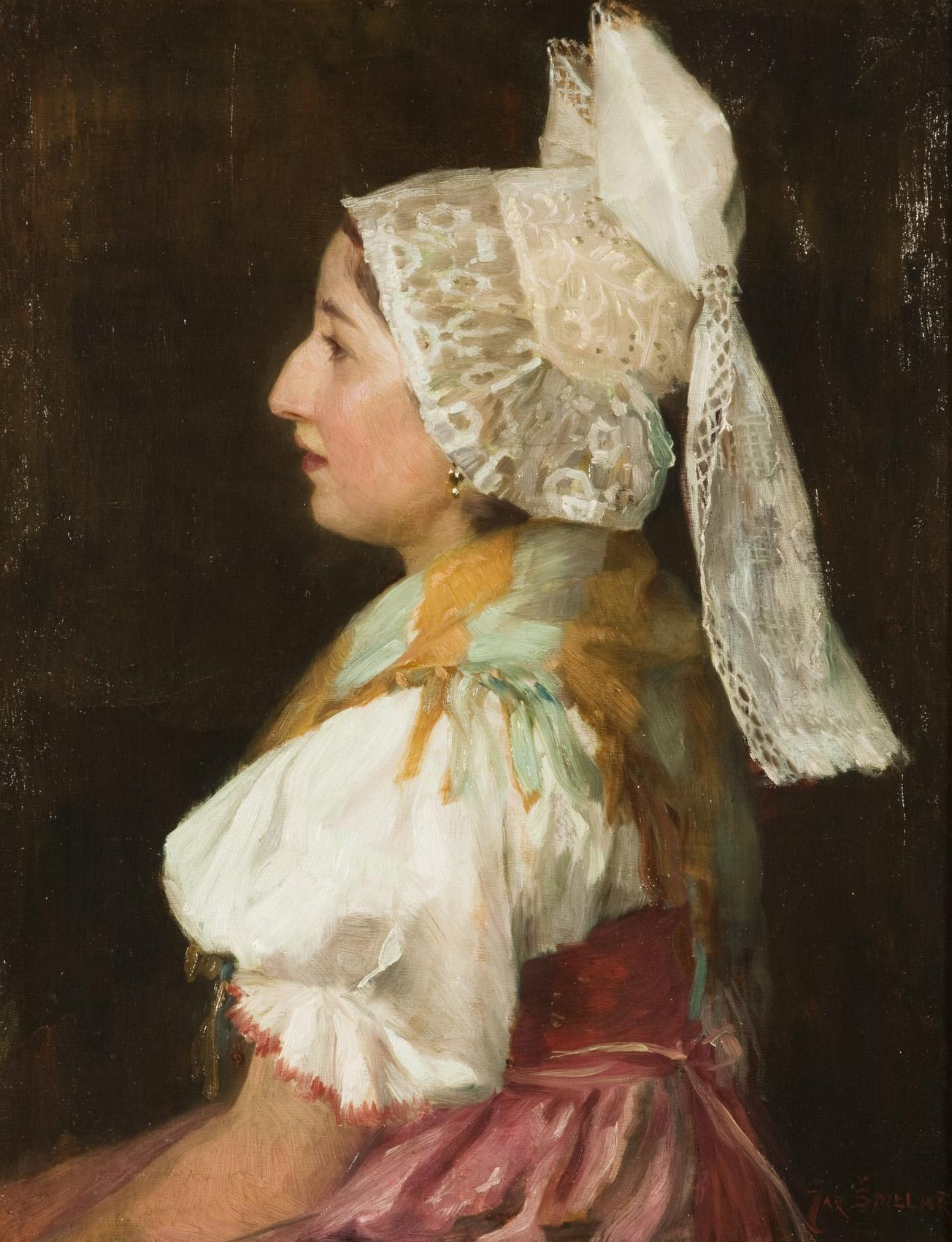
"Lovebird" (1900)
