= Čerchov =

Mountain at the Czech-German border

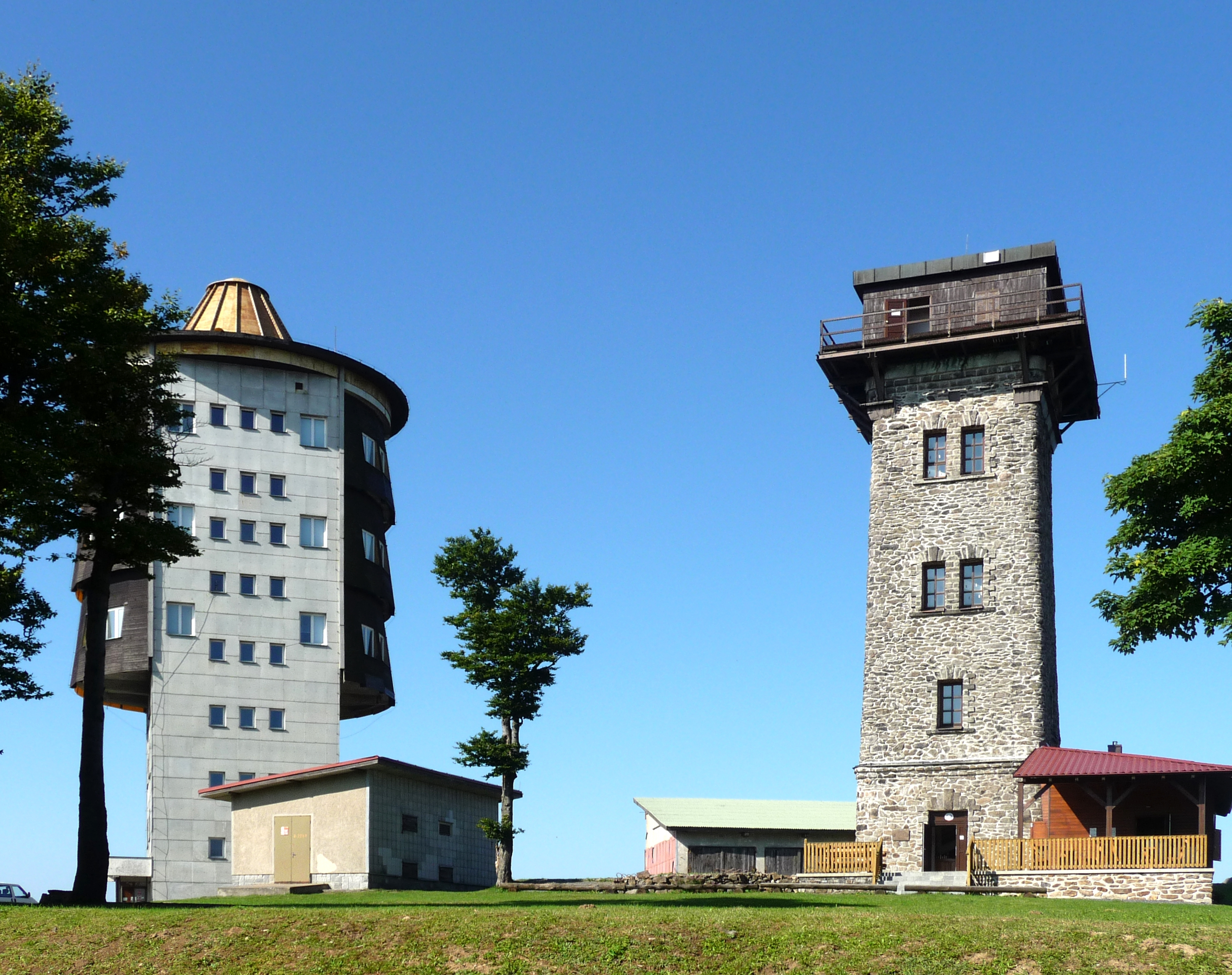
- The towers on the summit of Čerchov (Kurz Tower, flight safety tower)

Highest point
- Elevation: 1,042 m (3,419 ft)
- Prominence: 549 m ↓ east of Nový Klíčov
- Isolation: 19.4 km → Hoher Bogen (Bavarian Forest) to Schwarzriegel
- Listing: Highest mountain in the Upper Palatine Forest
- Coordinates: 49°23′00″N 12°47′01″E

Geography
- Location within Czech Republic
- Location: Location in the Czech Republic
- Parent range: Upper Palatine Forest

Čerchov (German: Schwarzkopf) is the highest mountain in the Upper Palatine Forest, Czech Republic, at 1,042 metres (3,419 ft) above sea level.

== Location ==
The peak of Čerchov lies about 2 km from the Czech–German border. It lies on the municipal border between Česká Kubice and Pec, 11 kilometres (7 mi) southwest of Domažlice.

== History ==
After its use by the Wehrmacht in the Second World War the summit was intensively used by the Warsaw Pact until the 1990s as a surveillance station and was placed out of bounds to the public. In addition to the observation tower erected in 1904 by Vilém Kurz and known as the Kurz Tower, a second, larger tower was built in 1987 by the Czechoslovak Army which is used today for flight safety purposes and is not accessible. The corresponding NATO communication station was located on the Hoher Bogen about 20 km away to the southeast. Other surveillance posts were sited inter alia on the Velký Zvon (German: Plattenberg, with a tower of very similar design built in 1978 and which had line-of-sight to the Čerchov site) and the Dyleň. As well as the Soviet Army the site was also used by Hauptabteilung III of the East German Stasi as a listening post (codenamed RUBIN). Following the opening of the border and reunification of Germany the listening posts were closed and from July 2000 the Kurz Tower has been accessible once more. The mountain offers an all-round view of the Bavarian Forest and the Czech Plain. In good weather conditions, the Alps may be seen. There is an amateur radio on the mountain.
