= Municipal House =

Concert hall in Prague, Czech Republic

- Obecní dům
- Interactive map of the Municipal House area

General information
- Architectural style: Art Nouveau
- Location: Náměstí Republiky 5, Prague 1, Czech Republic
- Coordinates: 50.087°N 14.428°E
- Opened: 1912

Website
- https://www.obecnidum.cz/index.php?language=en

Municipal House (Czech: Obecní dům) is a civic building that houses Smetana Hall, a celebrated concert venue, in Prague, Czech Republic. It is located on Náměstí Republiky next to the Powder Gate in the centre of the city.

== History ==
The Royal Court palace used to be located on the site of the Municipal House. This complex was built around 1380 by King Wenceslas IV, and from 1383 until 1485, the Kings of Bohemia lived in the property. After 1485, it was abandoned. It was demolished in the early 20th century.

Construction of the current building started in 1905. It was designed by Osvald Polívka and Antonín Balšánek. It opened in 1912.

The Municipal House was the location of the Czechoslovak declaration of independence in 1918.

The roof of the building was the location for the INXS music video for their 1987 hit New Sensation.

== Architecture and art ==
The building is of the Art Nouveau architecture style. The building exterior has allegorical art and stucco. There is a mosaic called Homage to Prague by Karel Špillar over the entrance. On either side are allegorical sculpture groups representing The Degradation of the People and The Resurrection of the People by Ladislav Šaloun. Smetana Hall serves as a concert hall and ballroom. It has a glass dome. It houses artwork by Alfons Mucha, Jan Preisler and Max Švabinský.

== Today ==
Today, the building is used as concert hall, ballroom, civic building, and includes a café to the left of the lobby and a French restaurant on the right side. Beneath the ground there is also a wine bar and an American bar. Many of the rooms in the building are closed to the public and open only for guided tours.

== Gallery ==
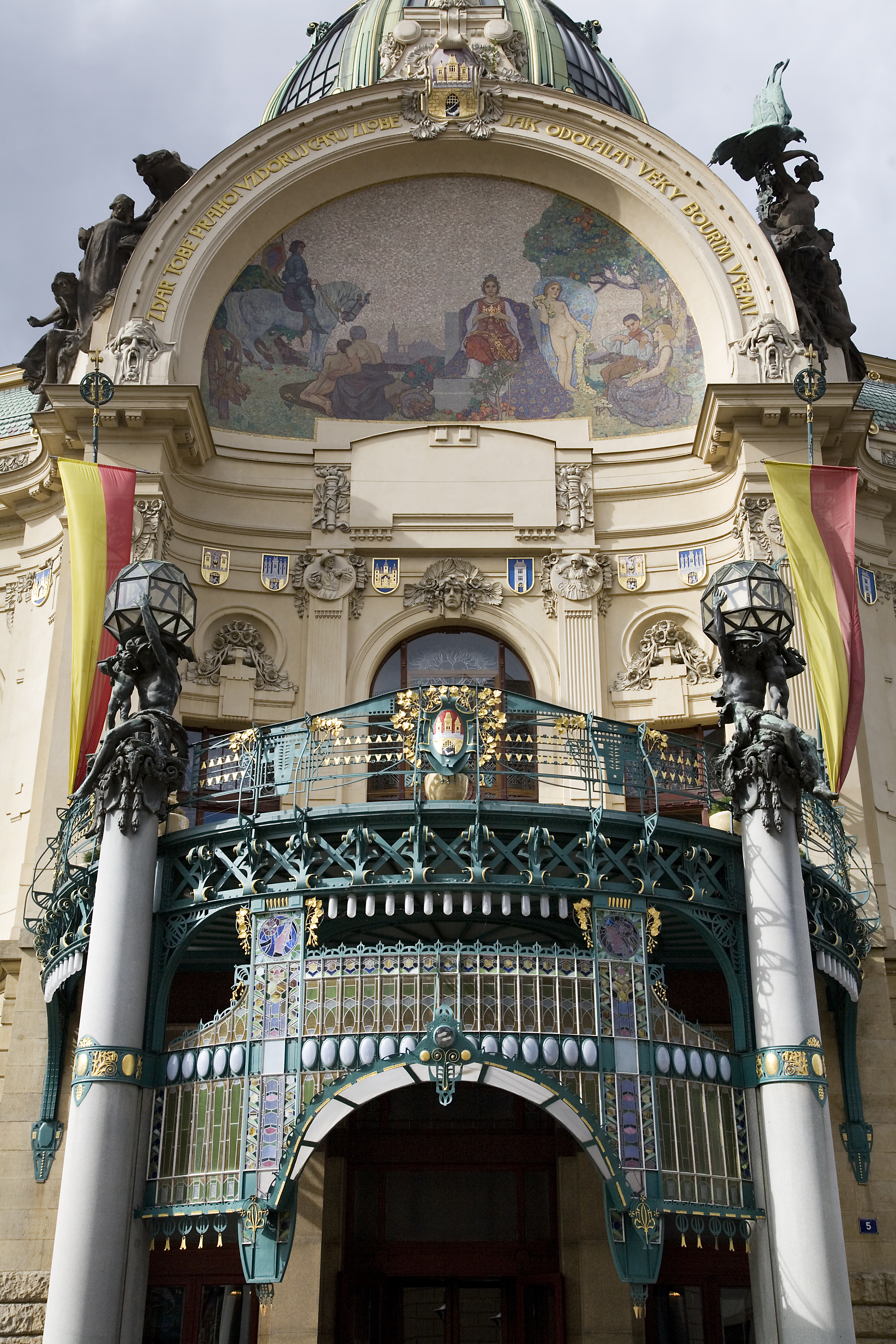
Main entry

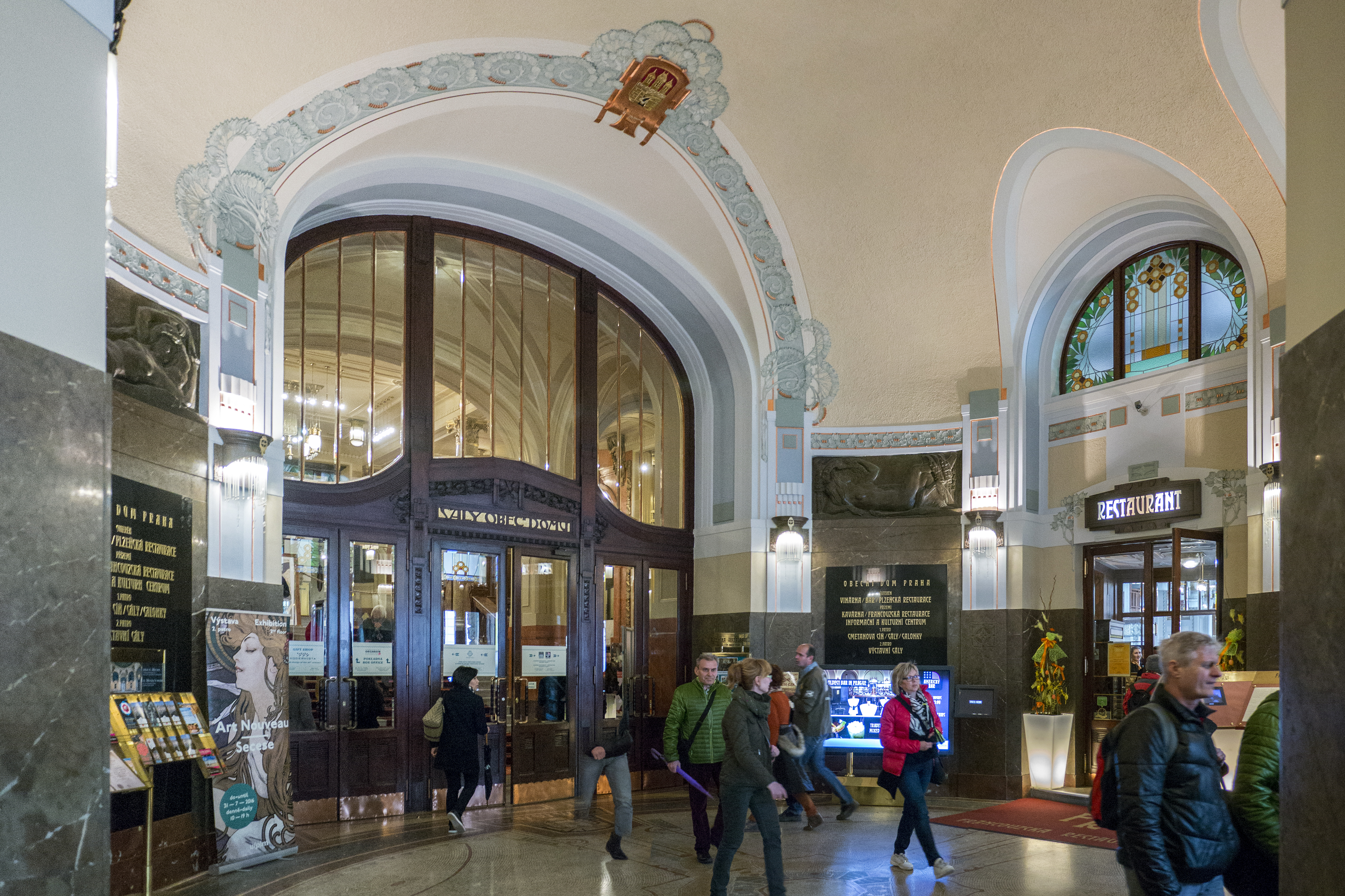
The Foyer

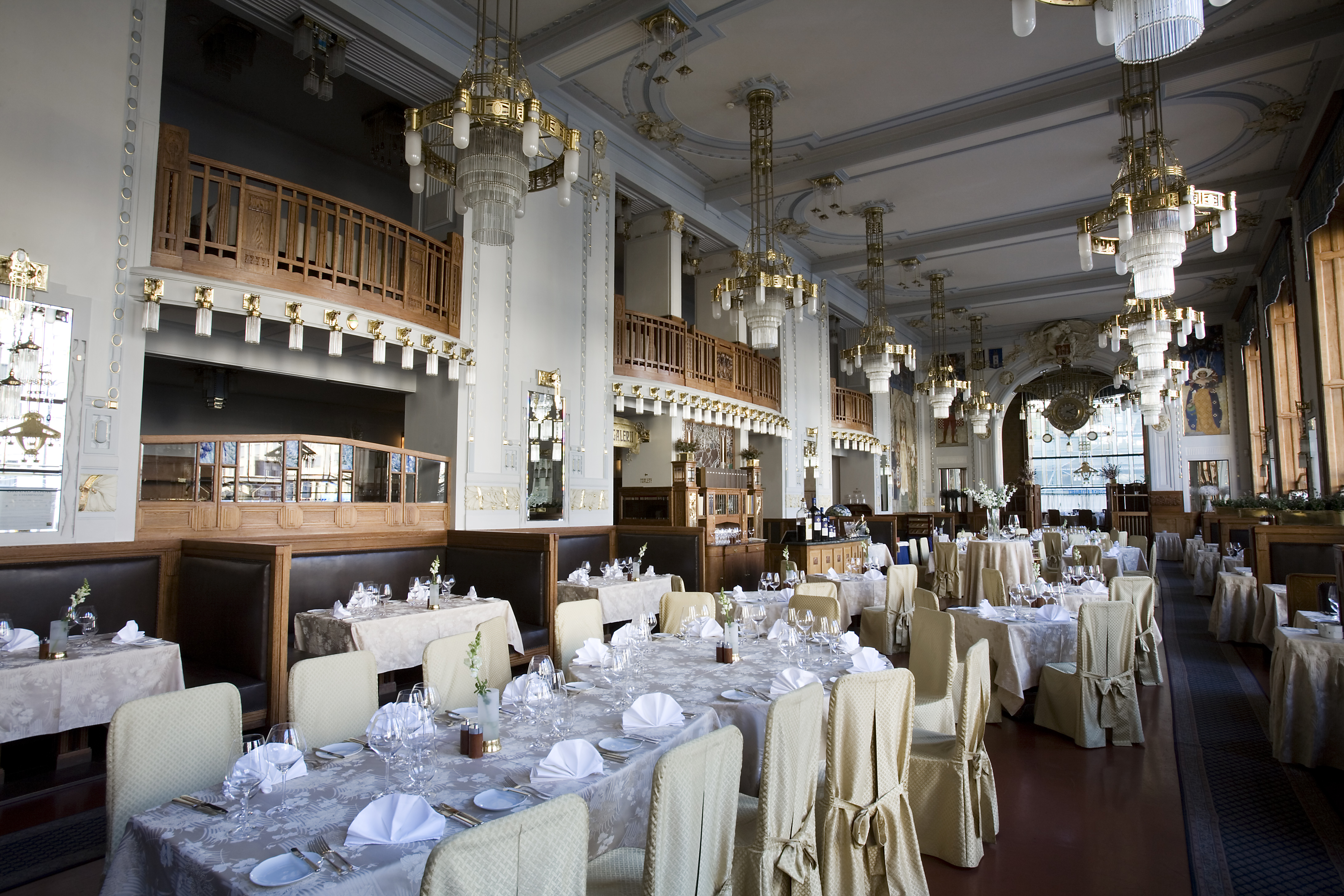
French restaurant

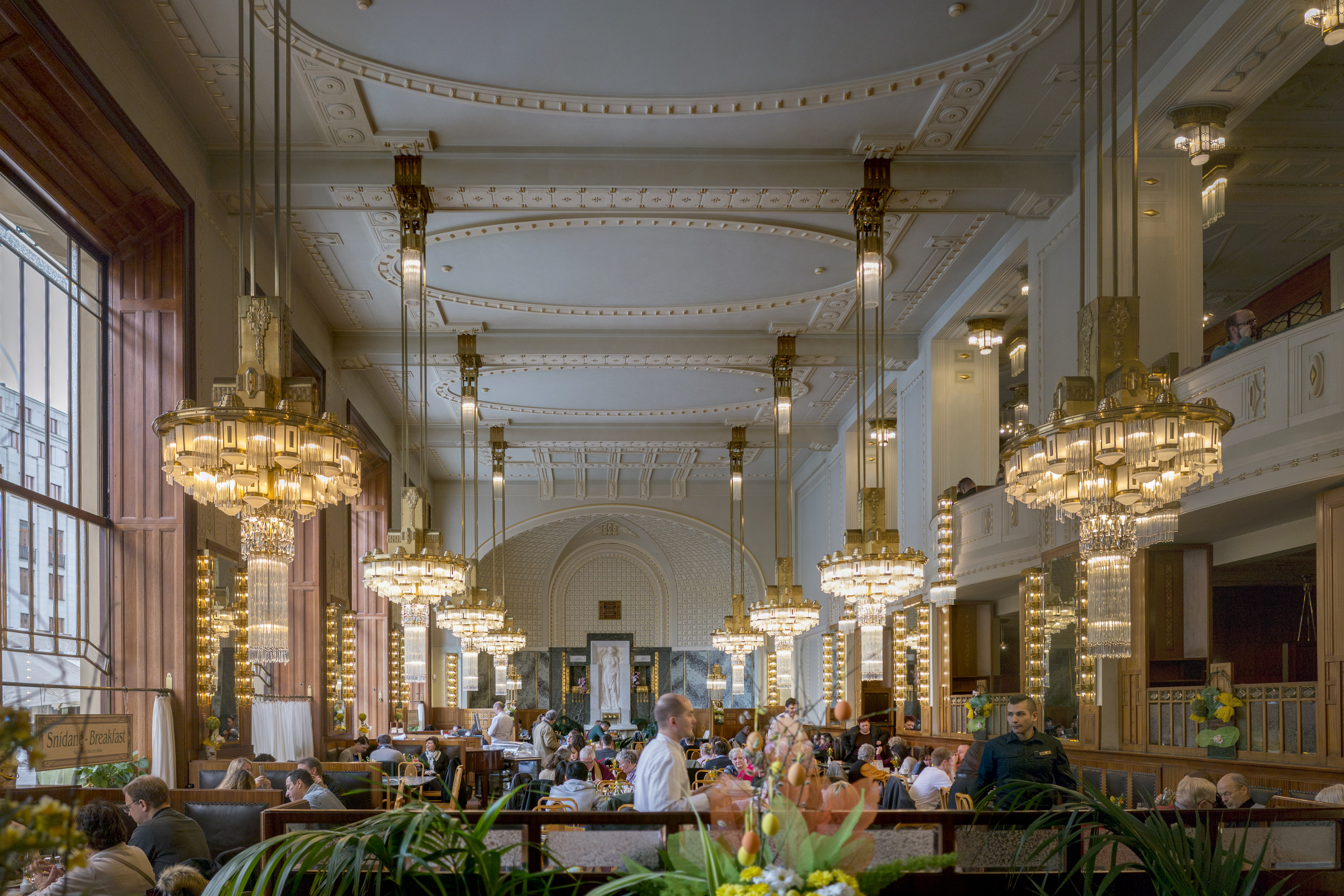
The café

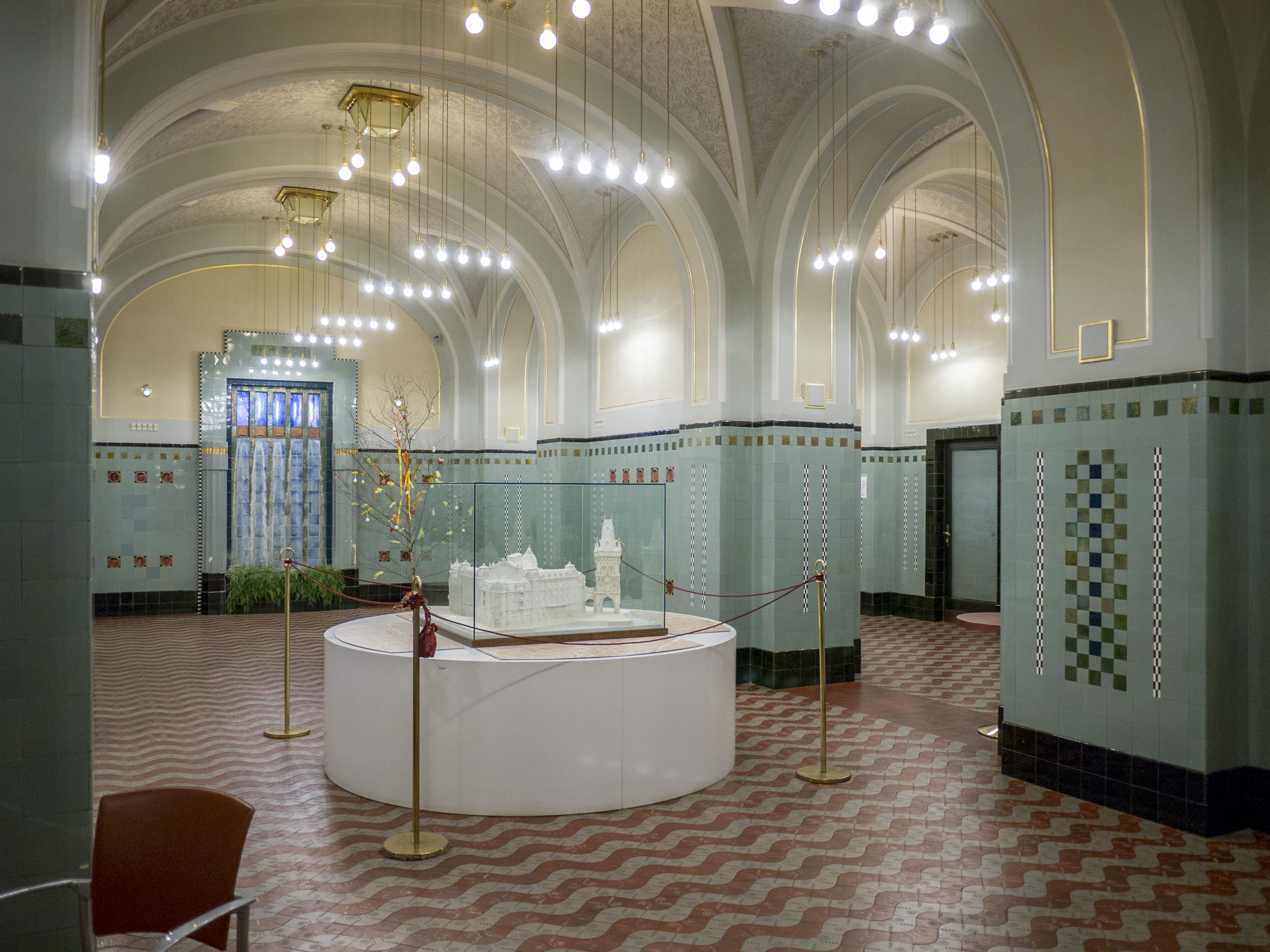
Hall in the basement

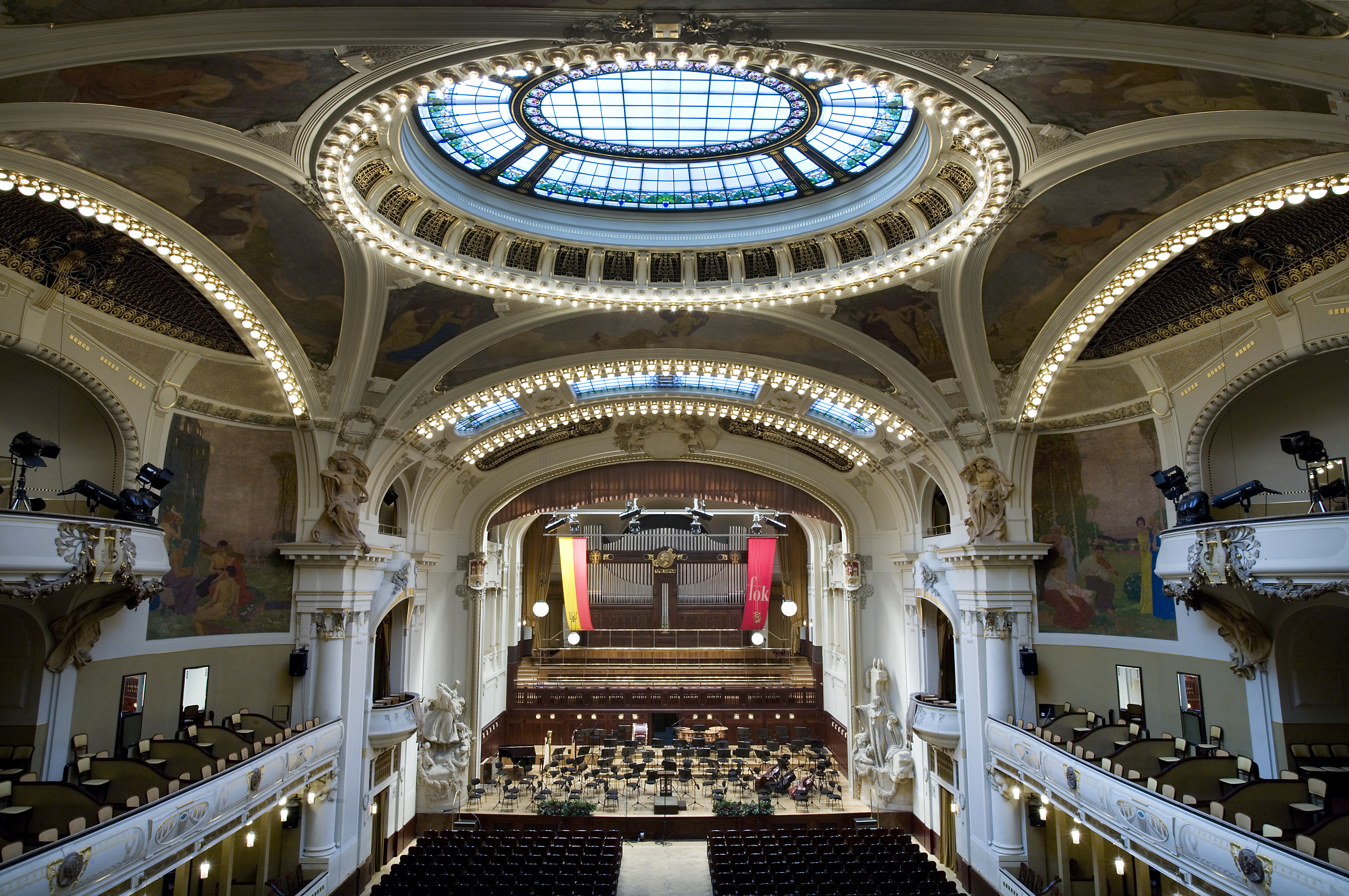
The Smetana Hall

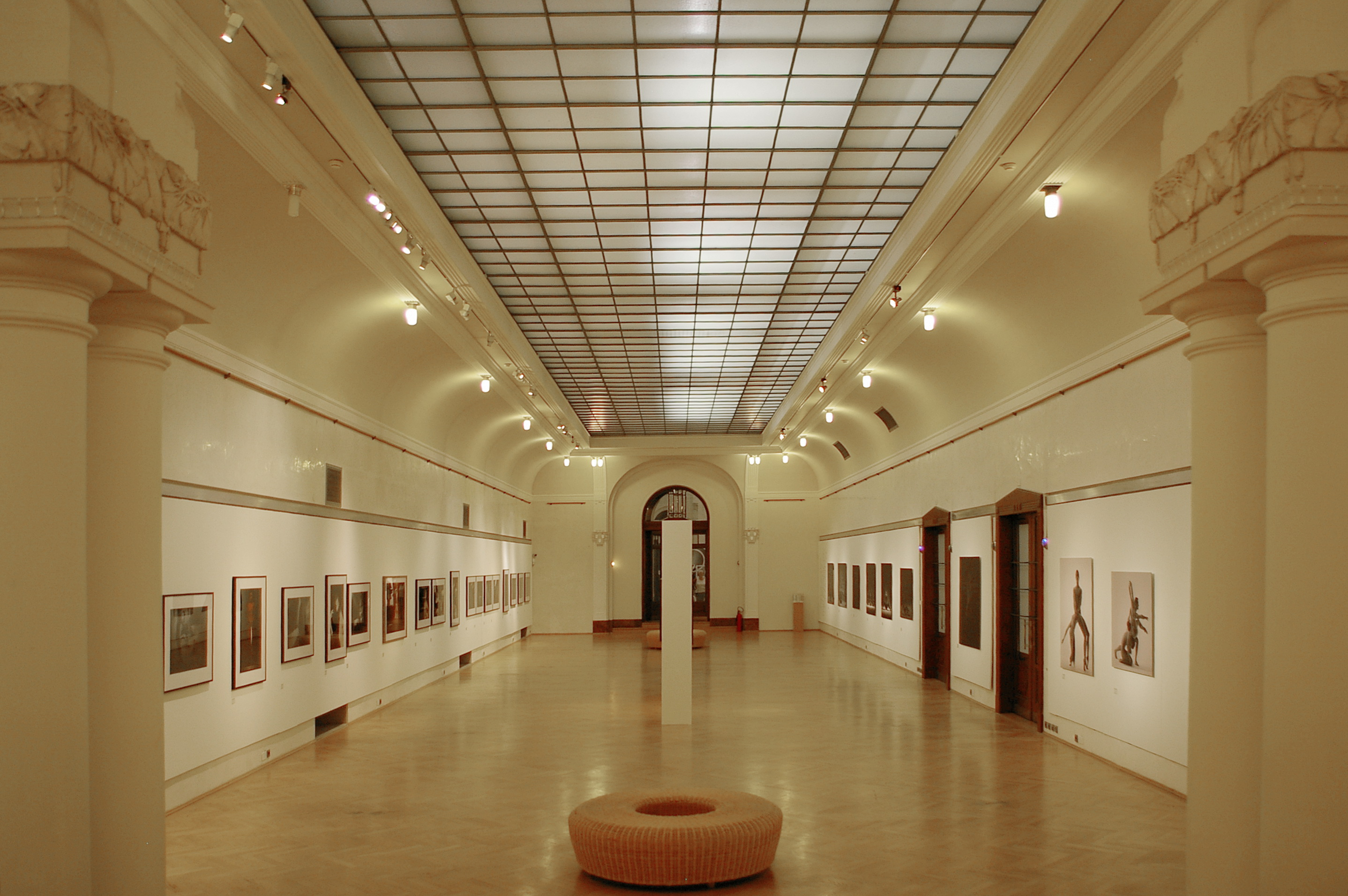
Exhibition hall

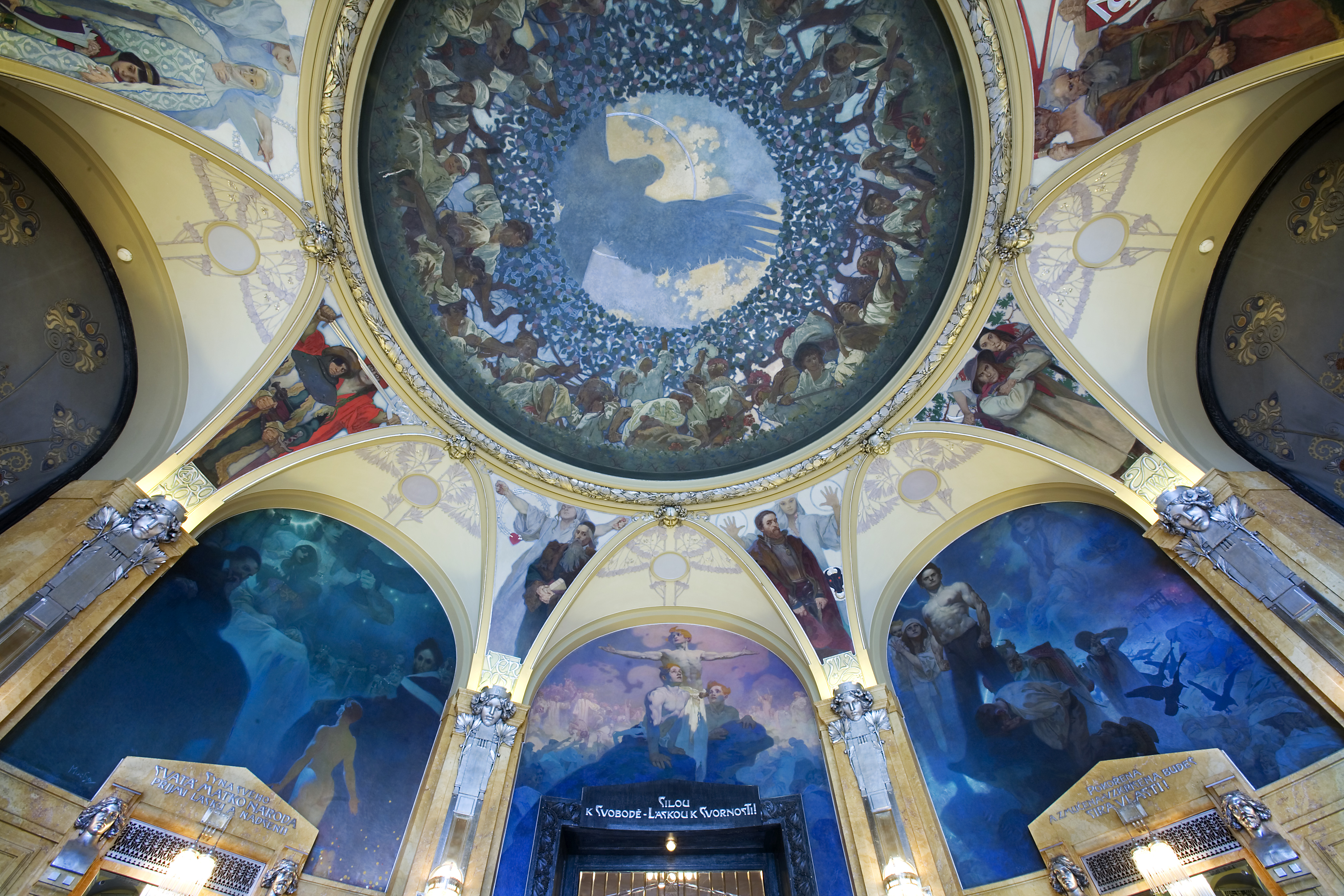
Fresko in the Primator-hall

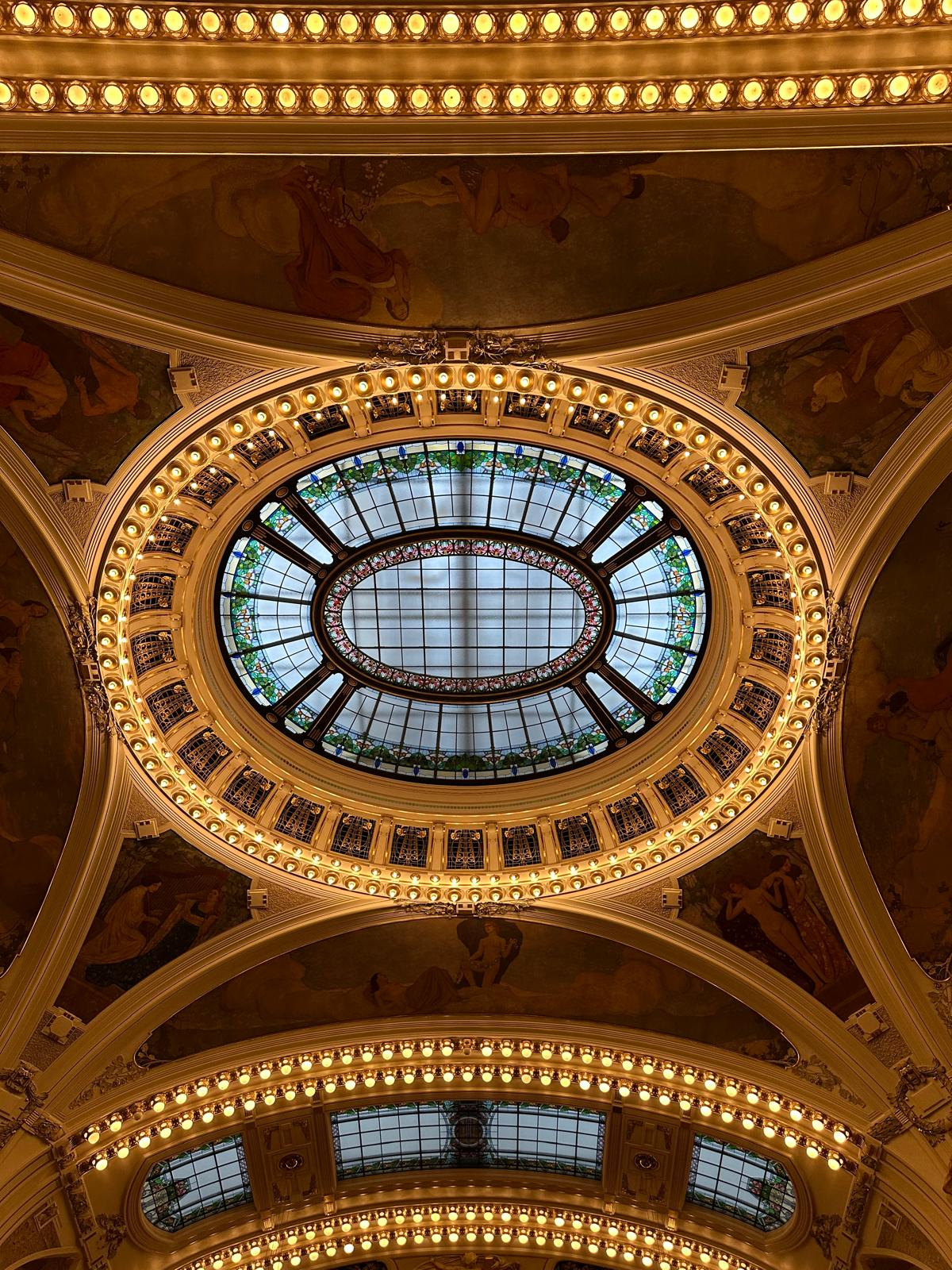
Smetana Hall ceiling

== Sources ==
- Peter Cannon-Brookes Czech Sculpture, 1800–1938
