= Česká Kubice =

- Municipality
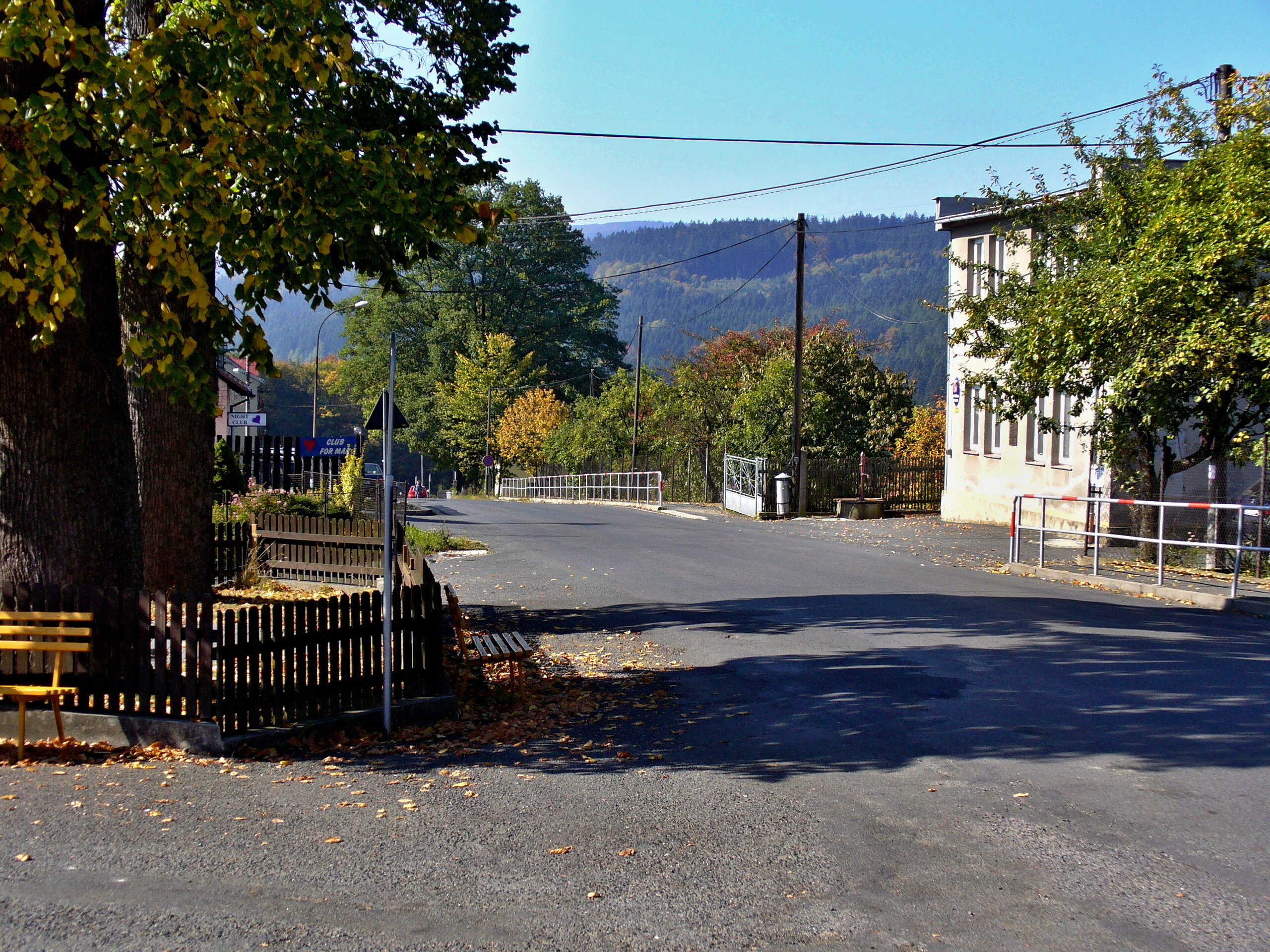
- Centre of Česká Kubice

- Flag Coat of arms

- Location in the Czech Republic
- Coordinates: 49°22′12″N 12°50′40″E
- Country: Czech Republic
- Region: Plzeň
- District: Domažlice
- First mentioned: 1697

Area
  - Total: 45.96 km^{2} (17.75 sq mi)
- Elevation: 552 m (1,811 ft)

Population (2026-01-01)
  - Total: 989
  - Density: 21.5/km^{2} (55.7/sq mi)
- Time zone: UTC+1 (CET)
  - Summer (DST): UTC+2 (CEST)
- Postal codes: 345 01, 345 32
- Website: www.kubice.cz

Česká Kubice (German: Böhmisch Kubitzen) is a municipality and village in Domažlice District in the Plzeň Region of the Czech Republic. It has about 1,000 inhabitants.

== Administrative division ==
Česká Kubice consists of seven municipal parts (in brackets population according to the 2021 census):

- Česká Kubice (432)
- Dolní Folmava (108)
- Horní Folmava (202)
- Nová Kubice (27)
- Nový Spálenec (54)
- Spáleneček (41)
- Starý Spálenec (17)

== Etymology ==
The name Kubice is a diminutive of Kouba, which is the Czech name of the river Chamb and the German town Cham. Malá Kouba ('little Kouba') was probably the name of a stream that originates here and then flows into the Chamb. The prefix Česká means 'Bohemian', which was used to distinguish from Německá ('German') Kubice (today Nová Kubice, a part of Česká Kubice).

== Geography ==
Česká Kubice is located about 9 kilometres (6 mi) southwest of Domažlice and 54 km (34 mi) southwest of Plzeň. The eastern part of the municipal territory lies in the Cham-Furth Depression. The western part lies in the Upper Palatinate Forest and borders Germany. The peak of the highest mountain of the Upper Palatinate Forest, Čerchov at 1,042 m (3,419 ft) above sea level, is situated on the northwestern municipal border.

== History ==
The first written mention of Česká Kubice is from 1697.

== Demographics ==
Historical population

Year	Pop.	±%
1869	2,443	—
1880	2,862	+17.2%
1890	2,694	−5.9%
1900	2,711	+0.6%
1910	2,400	−11.5%

Year	Pop.	±%
1921	2,186	−8.9%
1930	2,090	−4.4%
1950	765	−63.4%
1961	640	−16.3%
1970	648	+1.2%

Year	Pop.	±%
1980	582	−10.2%
1991	569	−2.2%
2001	619	+8.8%
2011	837	+35.2%
2021	881	+5.3%

Source: Censuses

== Transport ==
On the Czech–German border is the road border crossing Folmava / Furth im Wald-Schafberg. The I/26 road from Plzeň to the Czech-German border runs through the municipality.

Česká Kubice is located on the railway line Domažlice–Schwandorf. It is in operation only on weekends.

== Sights ==
The main historical landmark of the municipality is the Church of Saint Anthony of Padua, located in Horní Folmava. It was built in the late Baroque style in 1797.
