= Max Švabinský =

Czech painter, graphic designer and university professor

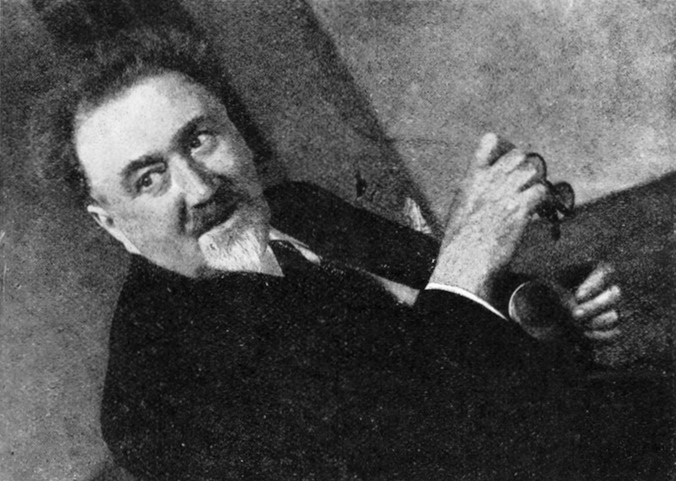
- Švabinský in c. 1933
- Born: 17 September 1873; Kroměříž, Moravia, Austria-Hungary
- Died: 10 February 1962 (aged 88); Prague, Czechoslovakia
- Education: Academy of Fine Arts in Prague
- Style: painting, graphic art

Max Švabinský (17 September 1873 – 10 February 1962) was a Czech painter, draughtsman, graphic designer, and professor at the Academy of Fine Arts in Prague. Švabinský is considered one of the more notable artists in the history of Czech painting and produced significant work during the first half of the 20th century. He was relatively unusual among modernist artists in that his work was accepted by the communist regime; this was due at least in part to his having formed his artistic personality prior to 1900, prior to the advent of cubism. His work was part of the painting event in the art competition at the 1932 Summer Olympics.

== Biography ==
Max Švabinský was born on 17 September 1873 in Kroměříž. Together with Jan Preisler, Antonín Slavíček, and Miloš Jiránek, he was one of the founders of Czech modern art. Early on, Švabinský exhibited period tendencies towards Plenérian Realism, Symbolism, and Art Nouveau. Some of his most important early works were portraits or family-oriented paintings. Švabinský and his wife Ela often stayed with the Vejrych family in Kozlov near Česká Třebová. There he was inspired by the picturesque landscape. This is the period in which he painted some of his most famous works.

In Kozlov, at the beginning of the century, he took up graphics systematically, especially etching and Mezzotint. On account of the high quality of his graphic work, he was appointed a professor of the Prague Academy in 1910, and in the same years completed murals for the Municipal House in Prague. In the pages of Paradisiacal Sonata in 1917, he extended his range with wood engraving, at which time his graphic work began to overtake his painting. During the thirties, he had the chance to work in monumental forms. After the mosaics for the National Monument on Žižkov Hill, he painted boards for three stained glass windows of the St. Vitus Cathedral in Prague. At the same time, and with the same graphic skill, he was able to design in miniature for a postage stamp. At the first session of the government in 1945, he was awarded the title of National Artist.

Max Švabinský died on 10 February 1962. The cottage in Kozlov (near Česká Třebová, East Bohemia, Czech Republic) where Max Švabinský stayed has recently been renovated and is now open to visitors. The interior looks just the same as 100 years ago and many of Švabinský's pictures are shown there. The tour can be performed both in Czech and English. Painted "Kamelie", Camellia in 1903.

He also painted in Serbia and as such he is included in a list of Serbian alumni who graduated from the Academy of Fine Arts in Prague in the first decade of the 20th century.

== Gallery ==
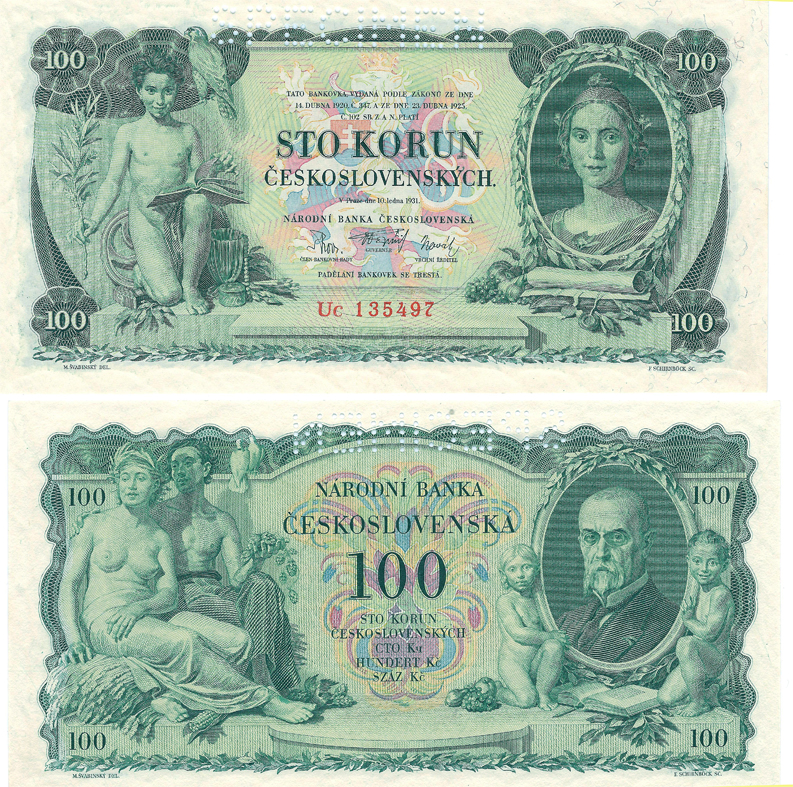
Banknote from Švabinský

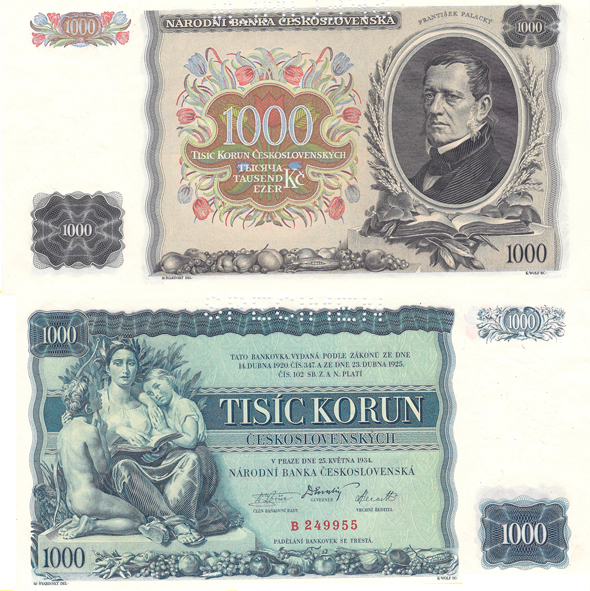
Banknote from Švabinský

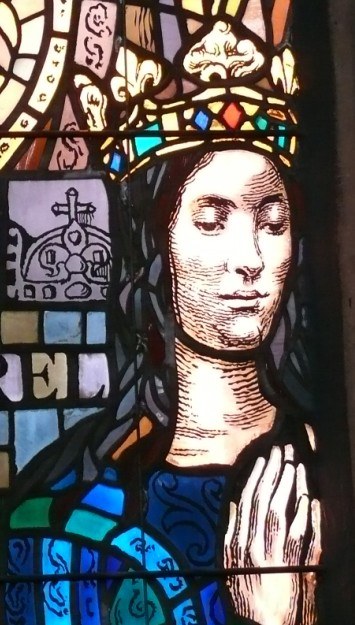
Stained-glass windows in St. Vitus Cathedral in Prague

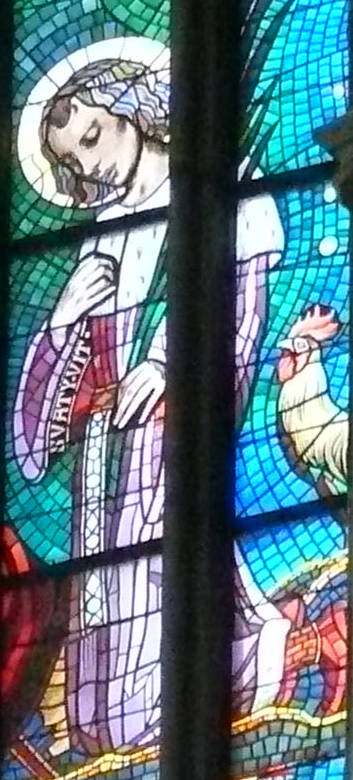
Stained-glass windows in St. Vitus Cathedral in Prague

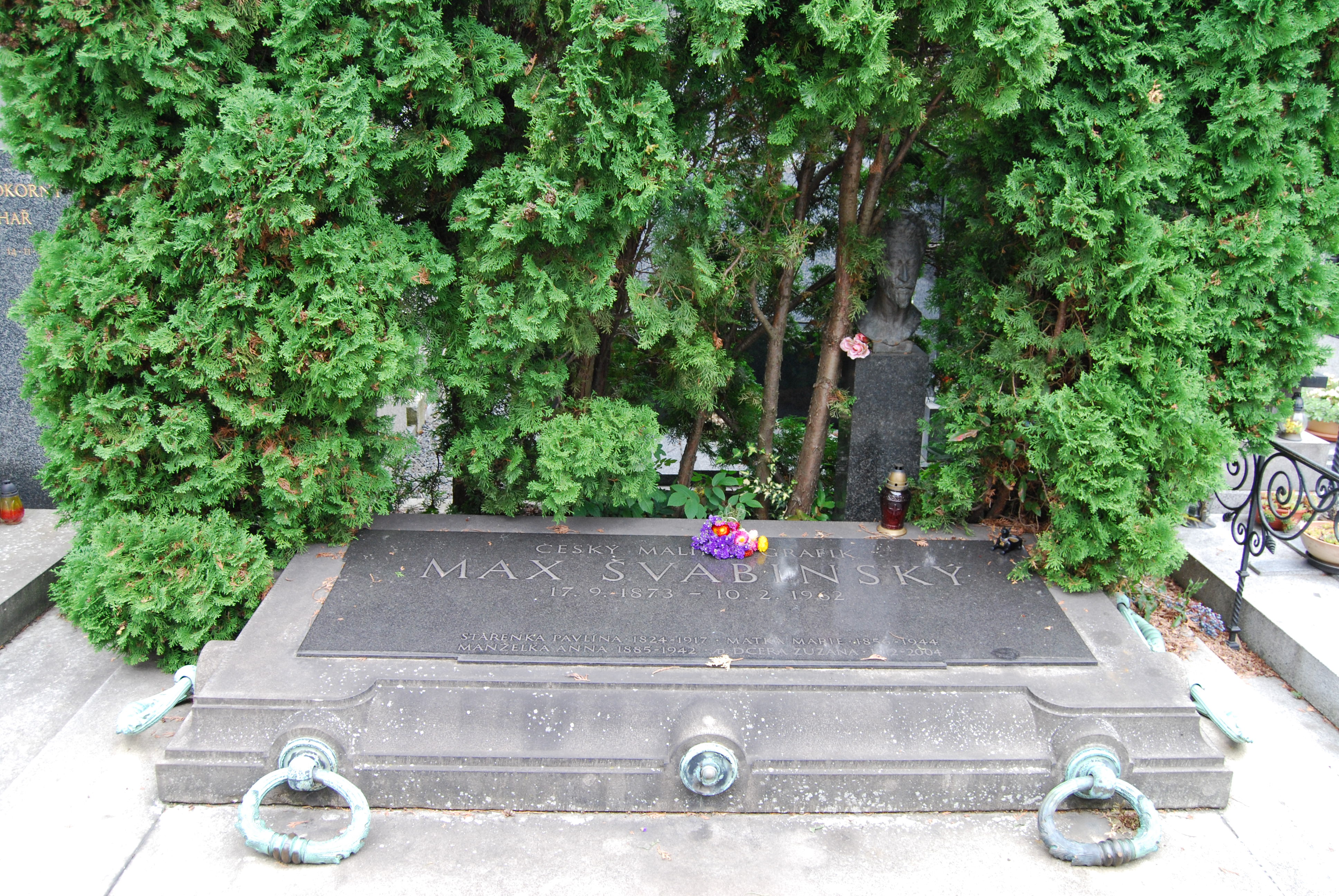
Švabinský' grave at the Vyšehrad Cemetery
