= Rudolf Vojtěch Špillar =

Czech painter and photographer (1878–1949)

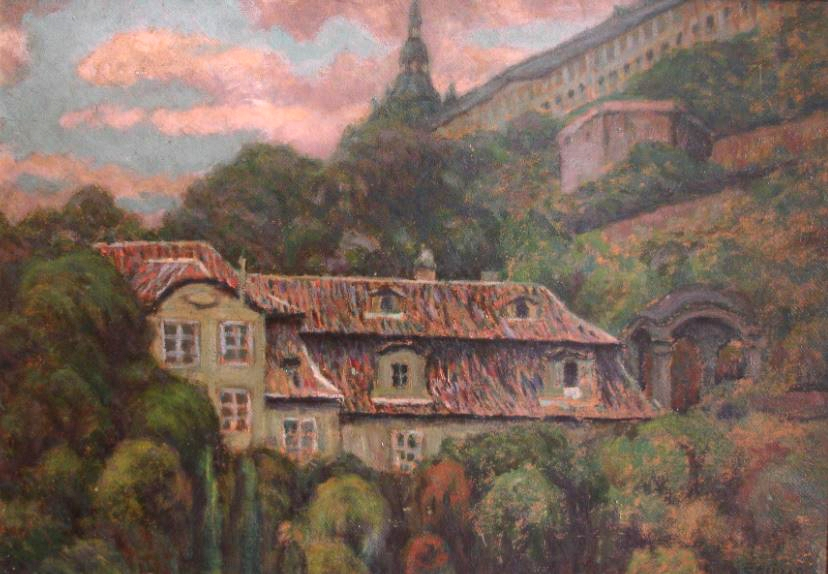
Hradčany (1930)

Rudolf Vojtěch Špillar (11 February 1878 – 22 March 1949) was a Czech painter and photographer. He wrote several manuals on the subject.

== Life and work ==
Špillar was born on 11 February 1878 in Plzeň. His father was a financial officer for the city of Plzeň. His brothers, Jaroslav and Karel also became painters. After completing his primary education, he found a position as a civil servant and worked as an amateur photographer; one of the first to practice pictorialism. In 1908, together with a professional photographer named Jan Špriňar, he wrote a Compendium of Practical Photography for Amateurs. It became very popular throughout Austria-Hungary and was reissued in several new editions after the establishment of Czechoslovakia. In 1918, he began writing The Science of Photography, which included contributions by Jindra Imlauf (1881–1921) and Jaroslav Milbauer.

He often stayed at Jaroslav's villa in Pec, and his death in 1917 may have prompted Rudolf to enter a special school, operated by Vratislav Nechleba at the Academy of Fine Arts, Prague, which he attended until 1923. After that, he undertook several study trips to Germany, France and Italy. He came to specialize in still-lifes, nudes, portraits and landscapes. Despite becoming quite proficient, he remained mostly an amateur as a painter, although he exhibited regularly at the Rubeš Gallery. His total output was, as might be expected, rather small.

He died on 22 March 1949 in Prague at the age of 71 and was interred at the Vinohrady Cemetery. Many of his works may be seen at the Špillar Brothers Gallery in Domažlice.
