= František Ženíšek =

Czech painter

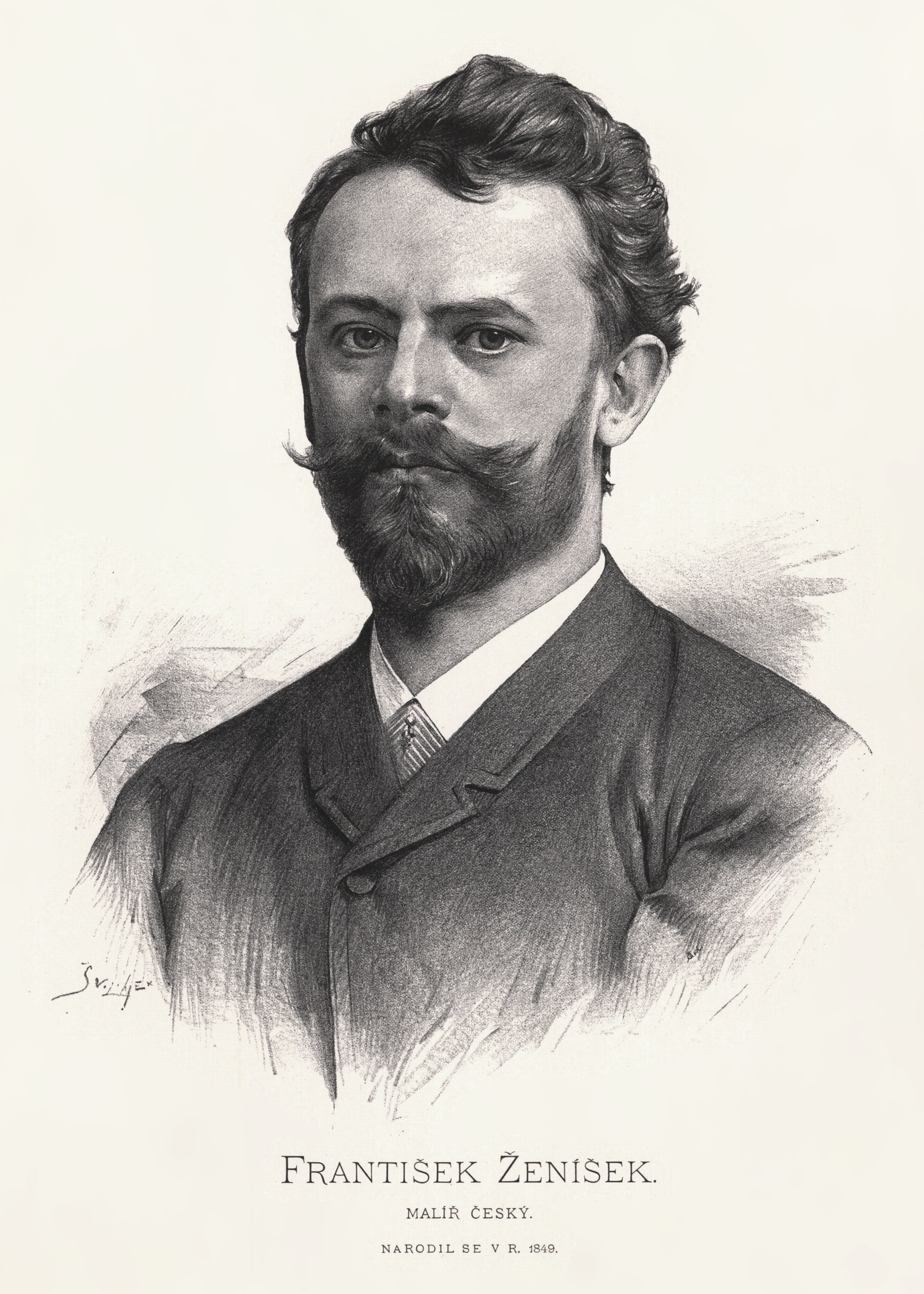
František Ženíšek, portrait by Jan Vilímek

František Ženíšek (25 May 1849 – 15 November 1916) was a Czech painter. He was part of the "Generace Národního divadla" (Generation of the National Theatre), a large group of artists with nationalistic sympathies.

== Early life ==
Ženíšek was born in Prague into a family of merchants and displayed an affinity for art at an early age. His father nervously agreed to let him pursue his interests and allowed him to take lessons from Karel Javůrek whilst he was still in school. From 1863 to 1865, he was at the Academy of Fine Arts, studying with Eduard von Engerth. After a brief stay in Vienna, assisting Engerth with work at the State Opera, he was back at the Academy in Prague, working with Jan Swerts and the history painter Josef Matyáš Trenkwald.

== Career ==
Ženíšek received his first major commission in 1875, painting murals at the city hall in Courtrai, Belgium. Whilst on a study tour to Paris, he gained an important friend and supporter in Josef Šebestián Daubek, a well-known patron of the arts, who requested him to decorate his home in Liteň. Ženíšek later accompanied Daubek on his honeymoon to the Netherlands and painted a portrait of the new couple.

Soon after returning from Paris, Ženíšek and Mikoláš Aleš won a competition to decorate the foyer of the National Theatre with historic and allegorical designs. Ženíšek went on to decorate the auditorium ceiling and design a curtain, although the curtain was destroyed by a fire disaster in 1881. He also painted windows at the church in Karlín and lunettes at the National Museum as well as over 80 portraits.

From 1885 to 1896, he was a professor at the Academy of Arts, Architecture and Design, where his assistant was Jakub Schikaneder. Then, from 1896 to 1915, he was a professor at the Academy of Fine Arts, where his students included Jaroslav Špillar and Jan Preisler. In 1898, he was one of the founders of "Jednota umělců výtvarných" (Union of Fine Artists), in an effort to strengthen the Czech nationalist viewpoint in the arts. Ženíšek died on 15 November 1916 in Prague.

== Personal life ==
His son, František (1877–1935) was also a painter of some note.

== Selected paintings ==
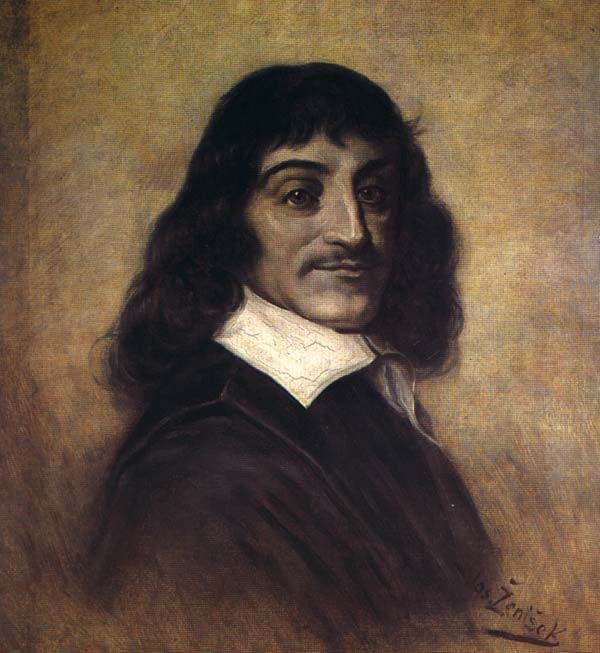
Portrait of René Descartes, after Frans Hals

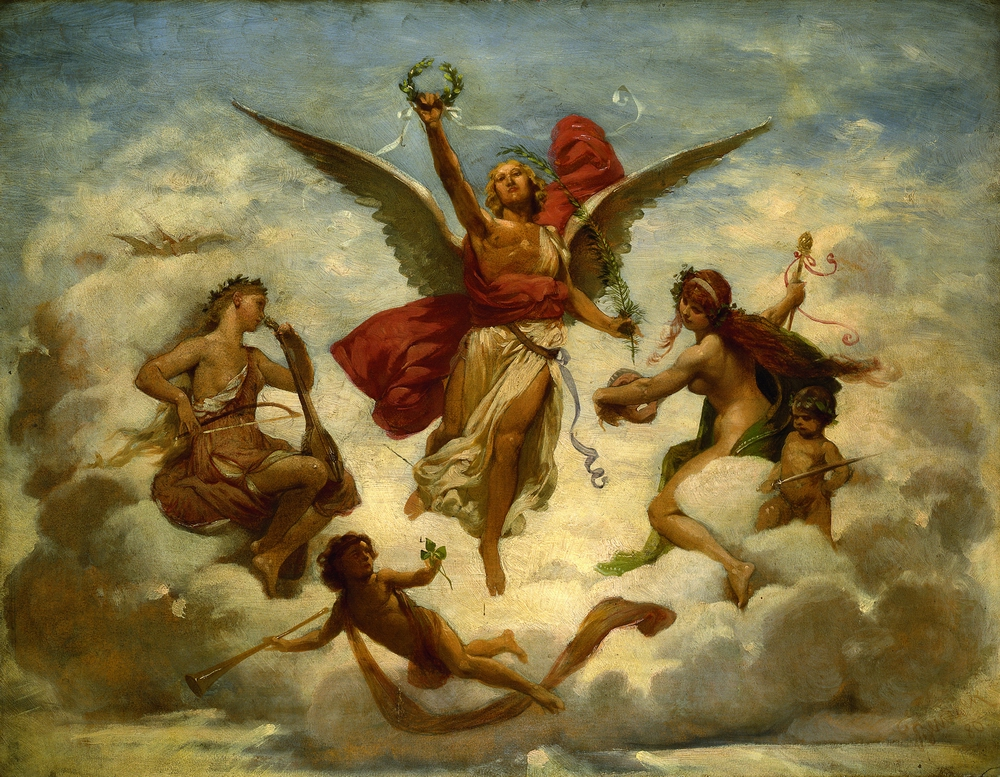
Study for the curtain in the National Theatre

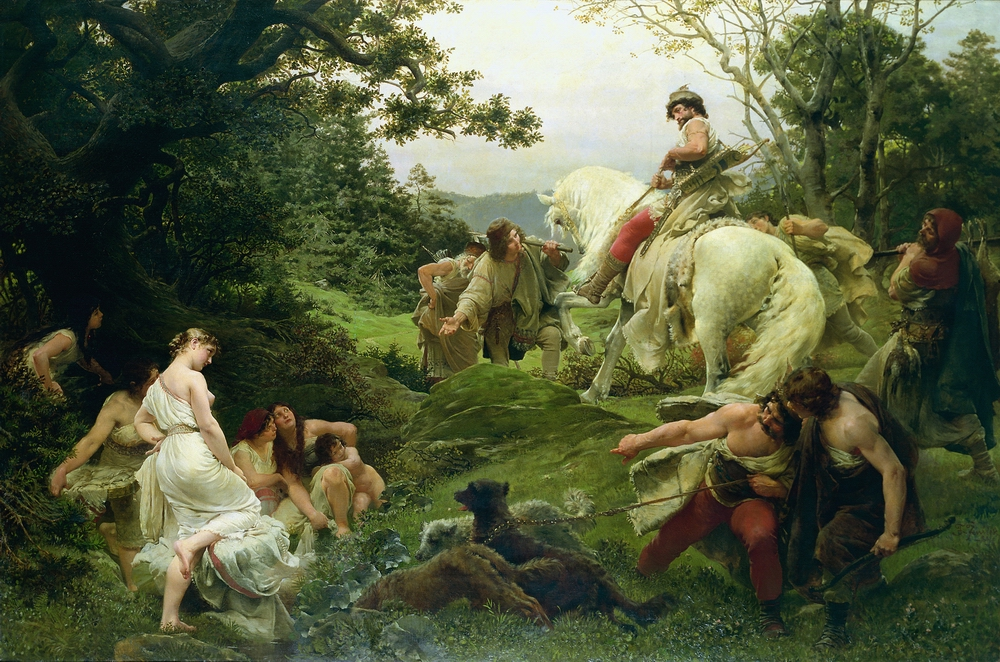
Oldřich and Božena

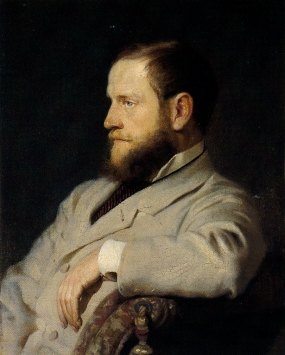
Portrait of Josef Šebestián Daubek
