= Jan Preisler =

Czech painter (1872–1918)

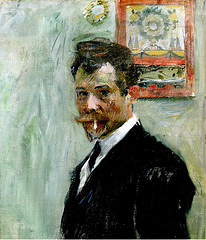
Self-portrait with Cigarette (c.1900)

Jan Preisler (17 February 1872, in Králův Dvůr – 27 April 1918, in Prague) was a Czech painter and art professor.

== Life ==
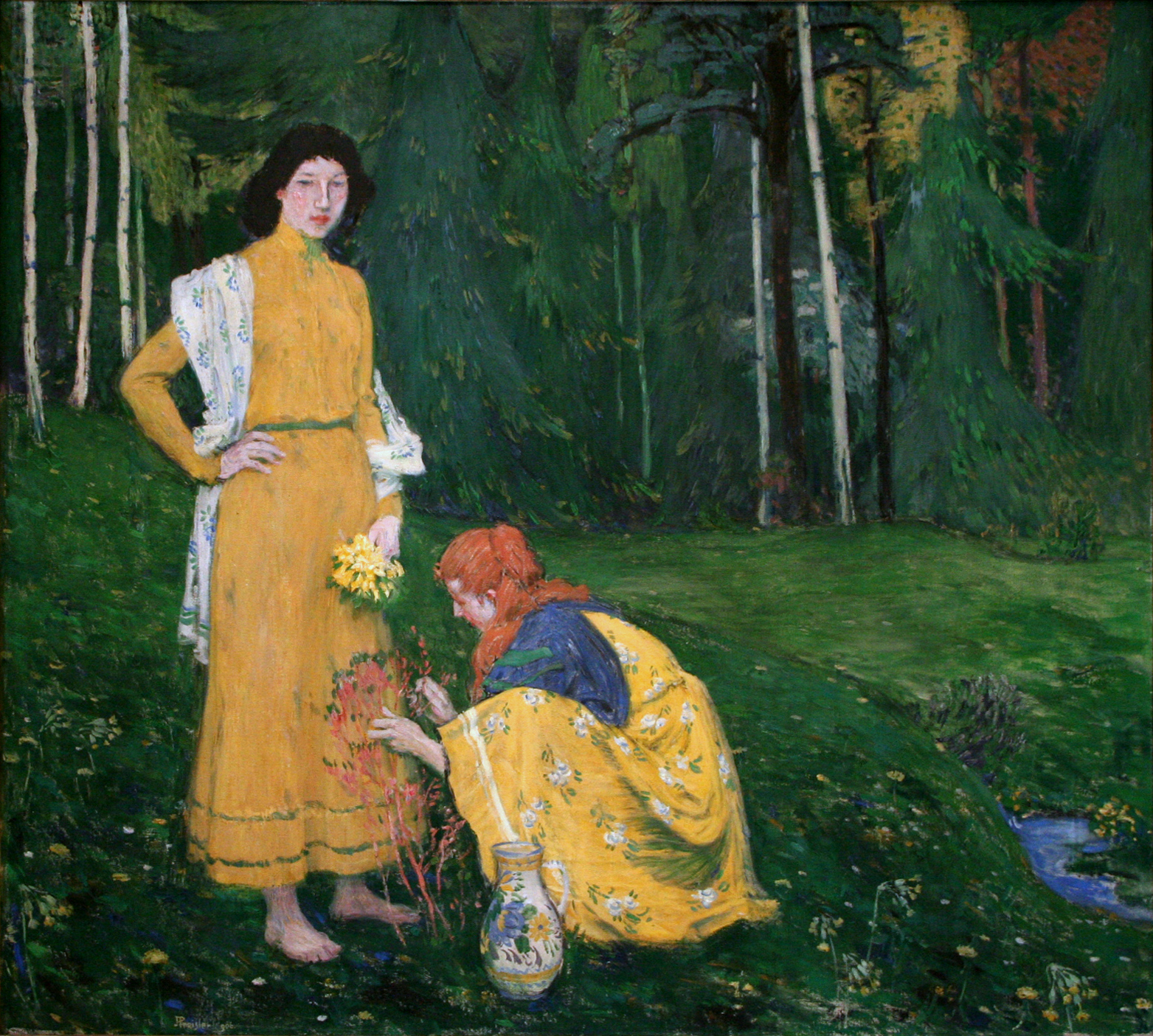
Spring (1906)

Jan Preisler’s family worked in the local iron foundry and he attended the nearby primary schools. From an early age, he was considered to be a loner who preferred walks in the woods to playing with friends. His drawings attracted the attention of his headmaster and his parents soon received letters inviting them to send him for studies in Prague, with financial support. In 1887, at the age of fifteen, he began his studies at the School of Applied Arts, where he initially worked under František Ženíšek, but was later allowed to pursue his studies independently.

After graduating, he shared a studio with Karel Špillar. During his time at the school, he had made contact with the Mánes Union of Fine Arts and became involved in its journalistic activities. In 1896, he provided the cover for the first issue of the association's magazine Volné Směry (roughly, Free Directions) and served as its editor for several years.

He travelled to Italy in 1902, helped design the posters for the Edvard Munch exhibition of 1905 in Prague and visited Paris in 1906, where he was influenced by the work of Paul Gauguin. In 1903, he became a teacher of nude drawing at the Academy of Fine Arts and served as a Professor there from 1913 until his death.

In 1914, he married Božena Pallas, from a local family involved in the production of handicrafts. They had two children. He died of pneumonia in 1918 and was interred in the family vault.

== Work ==
Preisler originally painted in a Neo-Romantic style, but later came to prefer the allegorical approach of symbolism. In the late 1890s, under the influence of Alfons Mucha and Vojtěch Preissig, he experimented with Art Nouveau. After the turn of the century, he attempted to express the ineffable and mysterious depths of the soul, filled with melancholy and desire, finding his inspiration in poetry. In addition to his canvases, he provided decorations for several buildings, including the Municipal House and the Hotel Central.

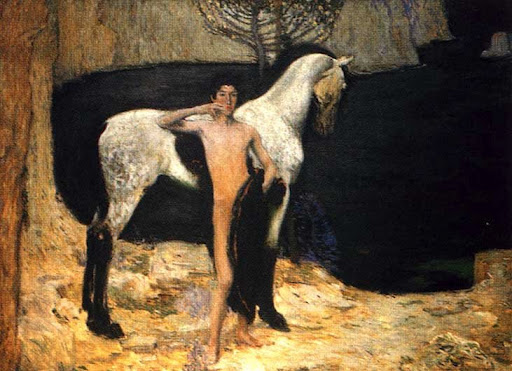
Black Lake (c.1900)
