= Pec (Domažlice District) =

- Municipality
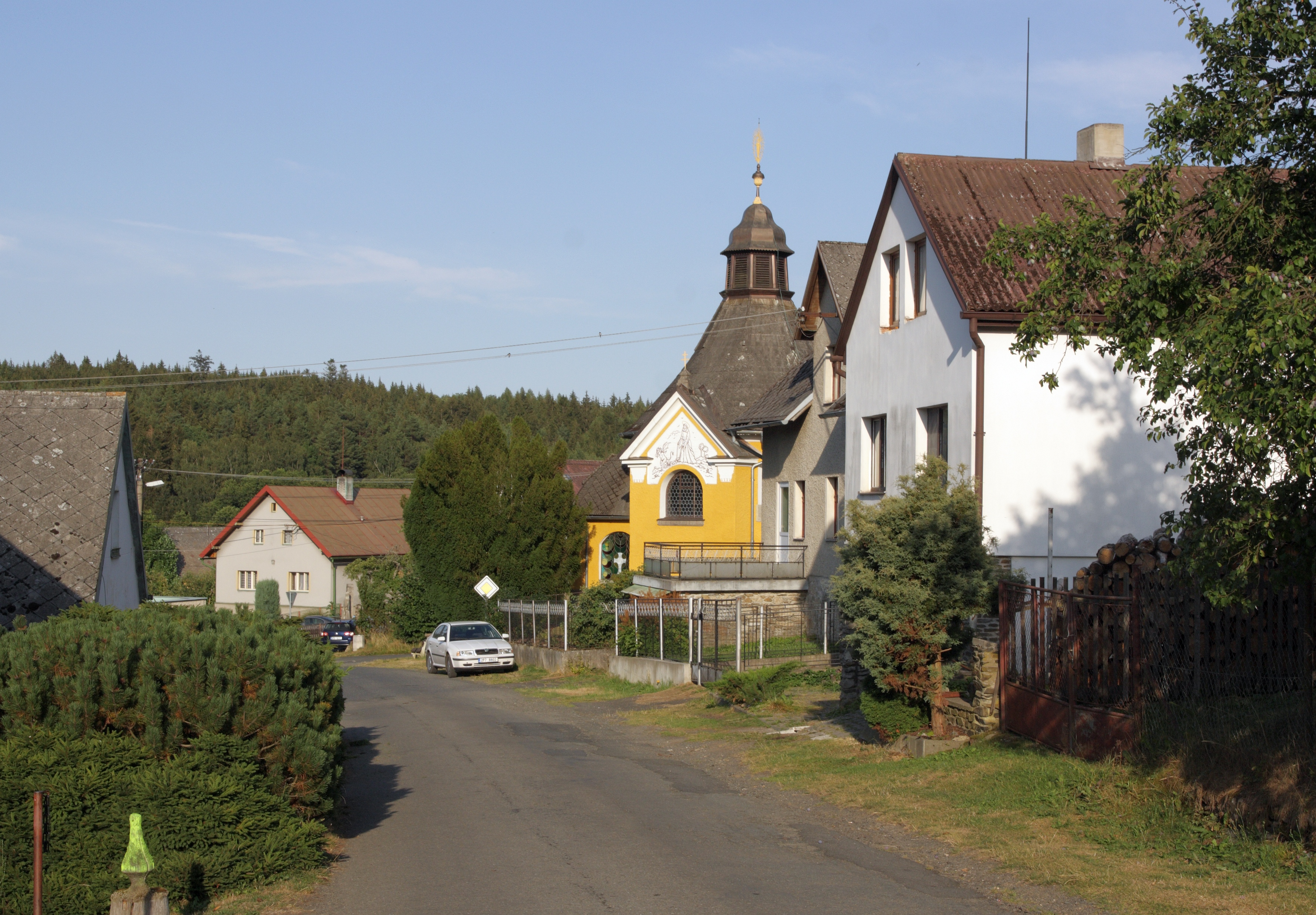
- Western part of Pec

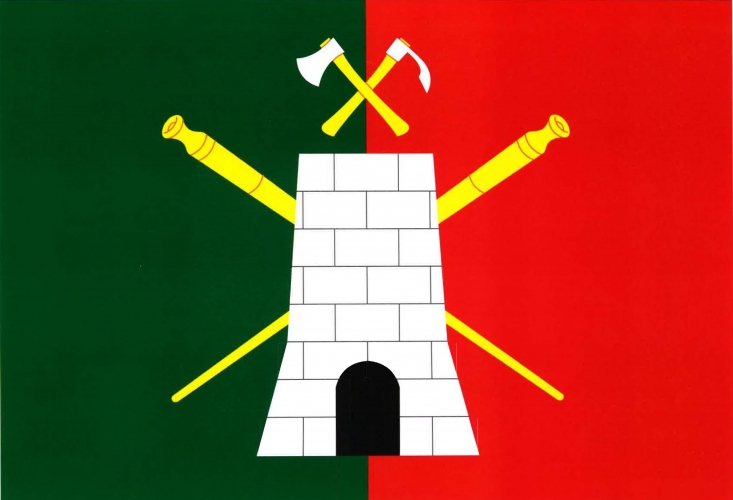
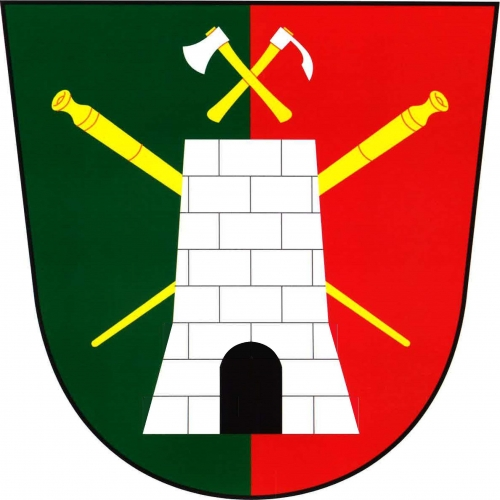
- Flag Coat of arms

- Location in the Czech Republic
- Coordinates: 49°23′55″N 12°49′52″E
- Country: Czech Republic
- Region: Plzeň
- District: Domažlice
- First mentioned: 1652

Area
  - Total: 8.00 km^{2} (3.09 sq mi)
- Elevation: 507 m (1,663 ft)

Population (2026-01-01)
  - Total: 206
  - Density: 25.7/km^{2} (66.7/sq mi)
- Time zone: UTC+1 (CET)
  - Summer (DST): UTC+2 (CEST)
- Postal code: 344 01
- Website: obecpec.cz

Pec (Czech pronunciation: [ˈpɛts]; German: Hochofen) is a municipality and village in Domažlice District in the Plzeň Region of the Czech Republic. It has about 200 inhabitants.

== Etymology ==
The name literally means 'furnace' in Czech.

== Geography ==
Pec is located about 8 kilometres (5 mi) southwest of Domažlice and 52 km (32 mi) southwest of Plzeň. It lies in the Upper Palatine Forest. In the western tip of the municipality is located the highest mountain of the Upper Palatine Forest, Čerchov at 1,042 m (3,419 ft) above sea level. The stream of Černý potok flows through the municipality.

== History ==
The first written mention of Pec is from 1652, when the construction of iron ore processing blast furnaces and smelters was documented. Around 1805, the smelters were abolished and replaced by glassworks. In the 19th century, the inhabitants made a living mainly by logging and making tools and shoes.

== Demographics ==
Historical population

Year	Pop.	±%
1869	545	—
1880	520	−4.6%
1890	513	−1.3%
1900	554	+8.0%
1910	626	+13.0%

Year	Pop.	±%
1921	622	−0.6%
1930	460	−26.0%
1950	388	−15.7%
1961	380	−2.1%
1970	341	−10.3%

Year	Pop.	±%
1980	259	−24.0%
1991	224	−13.5%
2001	242	+8.0%
2011	235	−2.9%
2021	217	−7.7%

Source: Censuses

== Transport ==
There are no railways or major roads passing through the municipality.

== Sights ==
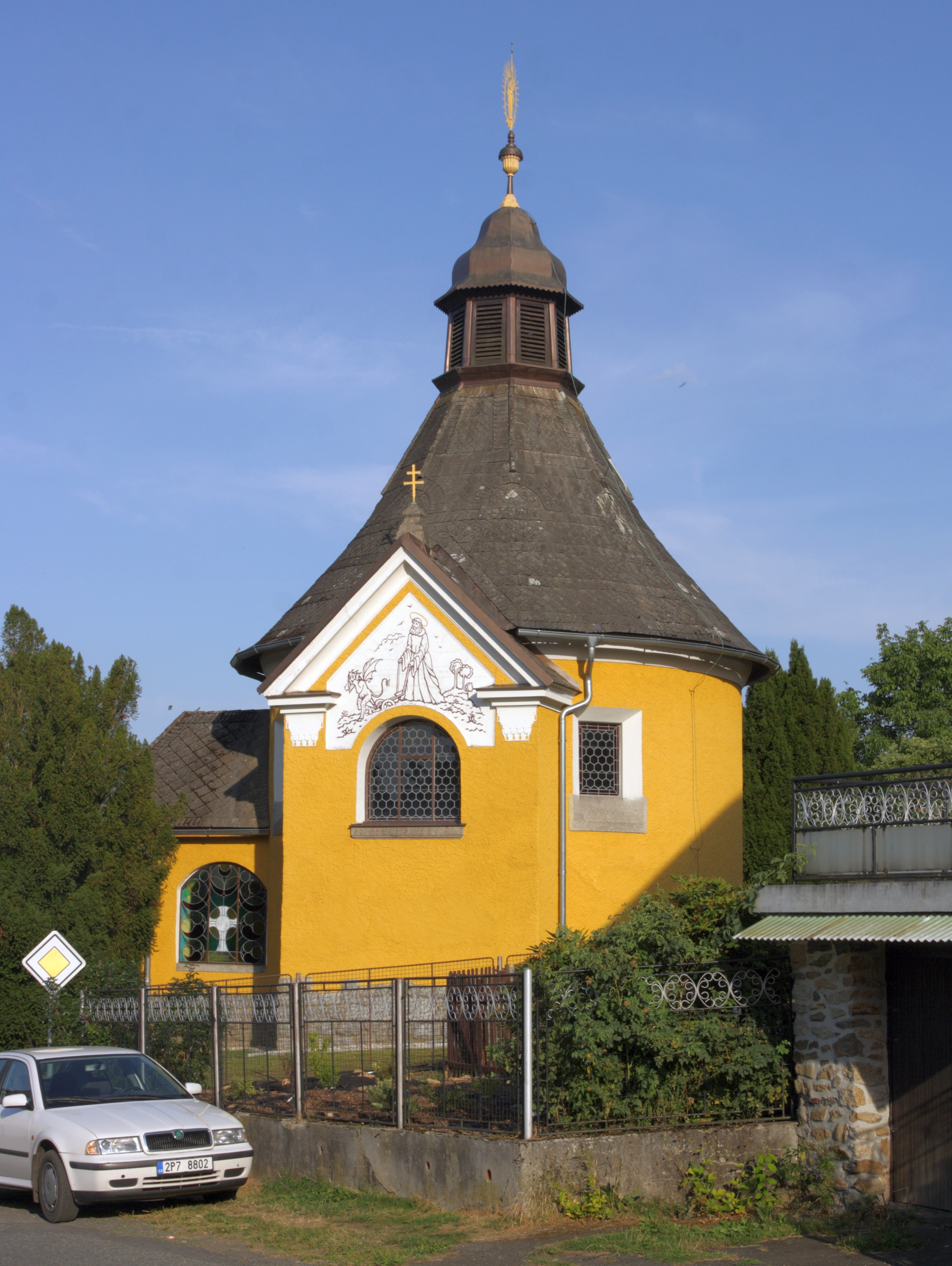
Chapel of Saint Procopius

The main landmark of Pec is the Chapel of Saint Procopius. It was built in 1908–1909 and consecrated to the patron saint of lumberjacks. In the municipal office there is the Lumberjack Museum with the industrial history of the village and logging.

On Čerchov is a stone observation tower, known as Kurz Tower. It was built in 1904–1905 and named after Vilém Kurz.

== Notable people ==
- Alphonse Mucha (1860–1939), painter; spent his honeymoon here and created several paintings here
