= Libkov =

Libkov may refer to places in the Czech Republic:

- Libkov (Chrudim District), a municipality and village in the Pardubice Region
- Libkov (Domažlice District), a municipality and village in the Plzeň Region
