= Vlkanov =

Vlkanov may refer to places in the Czech Republic:

- Vlkanov (Domažlice District), a municipality and village in the Plzeň Region
- Vlkanov (Havlíčkův Brod District), a municipality and village in the Vysočina Region
