= Všekary =

- Municipality
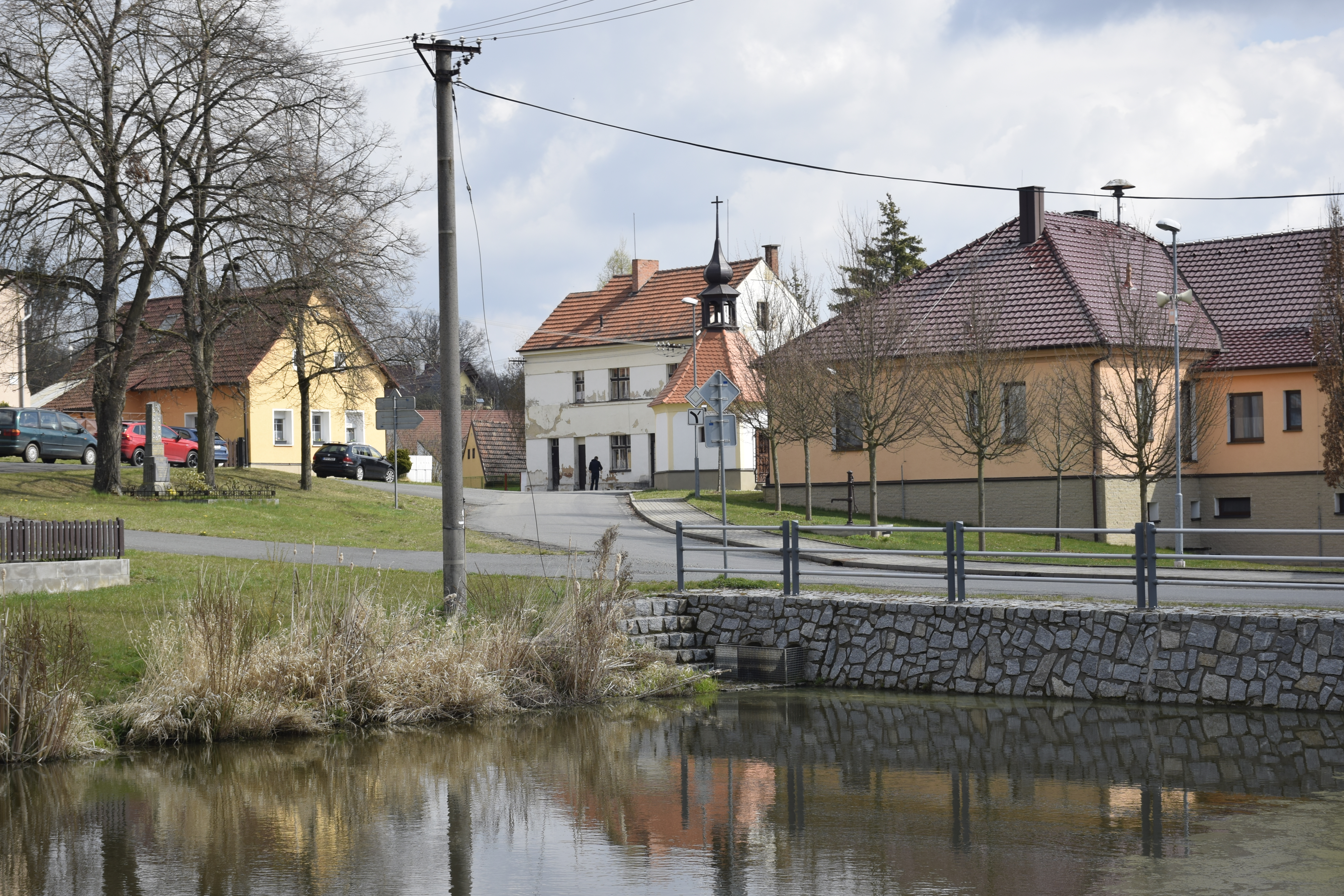
- Centre of Všekary

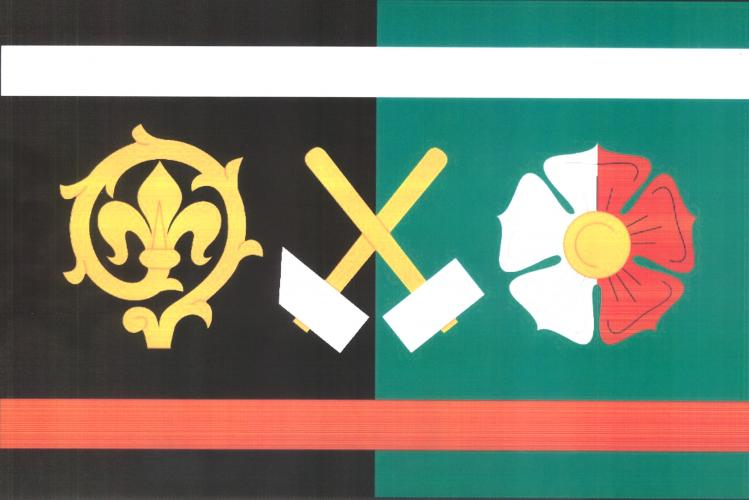
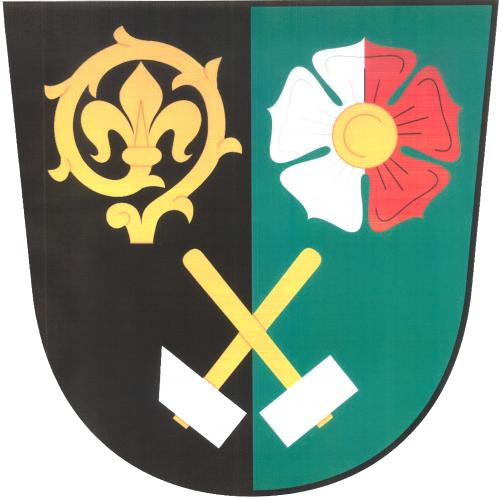
- Flag Coat of arms

- Location in the Czech Republic
- Coordinates: 49°36′13″N 13°2′33″E
- Country: Czech Republic
- Region: Plzeň
- District: Plzeň-South
- First mentioned: 1115

Area
  - Total: 8.56 km^{2} (3.31 sq mi)
- Elevation: 432 m (1,417 ft)

Population (2026-01-01)
  - Total: 106
  - Density: 12.4/km^{2} (32.1/sq mi)
- Time zone: UTC+1 (CET)
  - Summer (DST): UTC+2 (CEST)
- Postal code: 345 62
- Website: vsekary.cz

Všekary is a municipality and village in Plzeň-South District in the Plzeň Region of the Czech Republic. It has about 100 inhabitants.

Všekary lies approximately 21 kilometres (13 mi) north-east of Domažlice, 29 km (18 mi) south-west of Plzeň, and 113 km (70 mi) south-west of Prague.

== History ==
The first written mention of Všekary is from 1115.

From 1 January 2021, Všekary is no longer a part of Domažlice District and belongs to Plzeň-South District.

== Demographics ==
Historical population
Year	Pop.	±%
1869	242	—
1880	246	+1.7%
1890	273	+11.0%
1900	335	+22.7%
1910	335	+0.0%
1921	333	−0.6%
1930	362	+8.7%
1950	190	−47.5%
1961	192	+1.1%
1970	169	−12.0%
1980	132	−21.9%
1991	94	−28.8%
2001	82	−12.8%
2011	109	+32.9%
2021	104	−4.6%
Source: Censuses
