= Chodov (Domažlice District) =

- Municipality
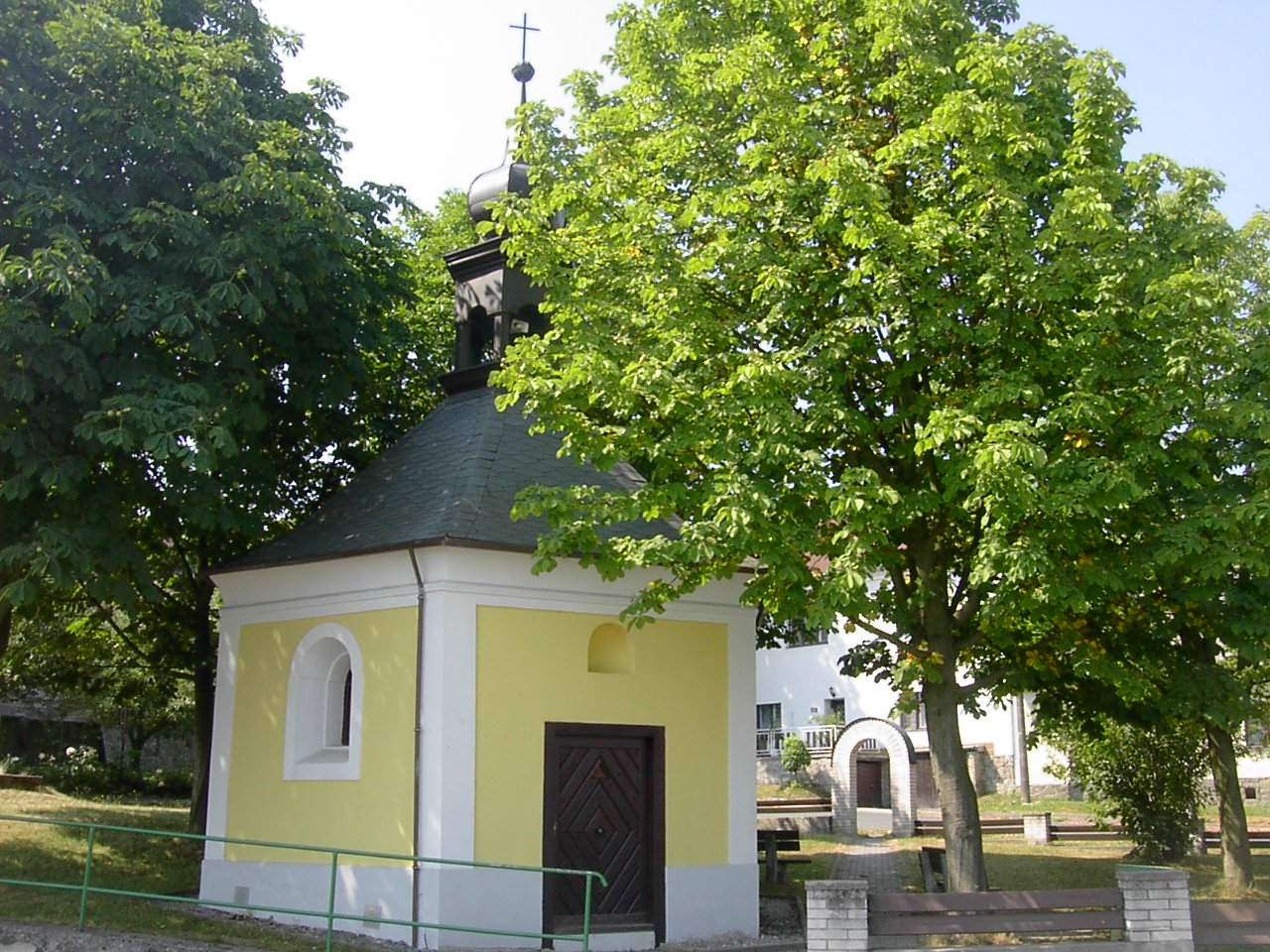
- Baroque chapel in Chodov

- Flag Coat of arms

- Location in the Czech Republic
- Coordinates: 49°25′5″N 12°49′49″E
- Country: Czech Republic
- Region: Plzeň
- District: Domažlice
- First mentioned: 1365

Area
  - Total: 8.88 km^{2} (3.43 sq mi)
- Elevation: 497 m (1,631 ft)

Population (2026-01-01)
  - Total: 752
  - Density: 84.7/km^{2} (219/sq mi)
- Time zone: UTC+1 (CET)
  - Summer (DST): UTC+2 (CEST)
- Postal code: 345 33
- Website: www.chodovudomazlic.cz

Chodov (German: Meigelshof) is a municipality and village in Domažlice District in the Plzeň Region of the Czech Republic. It has about 800 inhabitants.

Chodov lies approximately 8 kilometres (5 mi) west of Domažlice, 54 km (34 mi) south-west of Plzeň, and 137 km (85 mi) south-west of Prague.

== Demographics ==
Historical population
Year	Pop.	±%
1869	793	—
1880	806	+1.6%
1890	757	−6.1%
1900	811	+7.1%
1910	862	+6.3%
1921	849	−1.5%
1930	780	−8.1%
1950	587	−24.7%
1961	604	+2.9%
1970	547	−9.4%
1980	649	+18.6%
1991	765	+17.9%
2001	696	−9.0%
2011	755	+8.5%
2021	760	+0.7%
Source: Censuses
