= Velký Malahov =

- Municipality
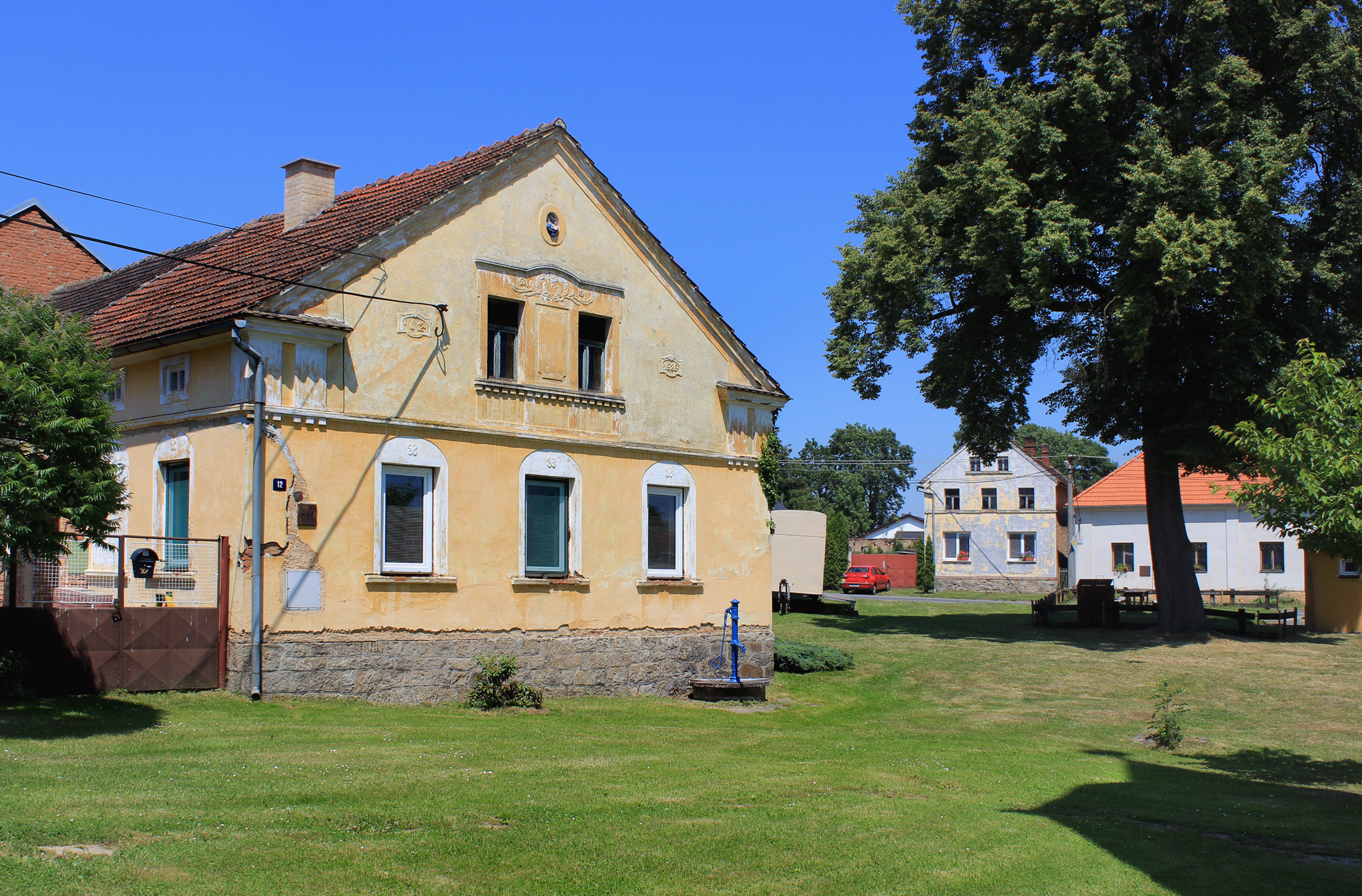
- Centre of Velký Malahov

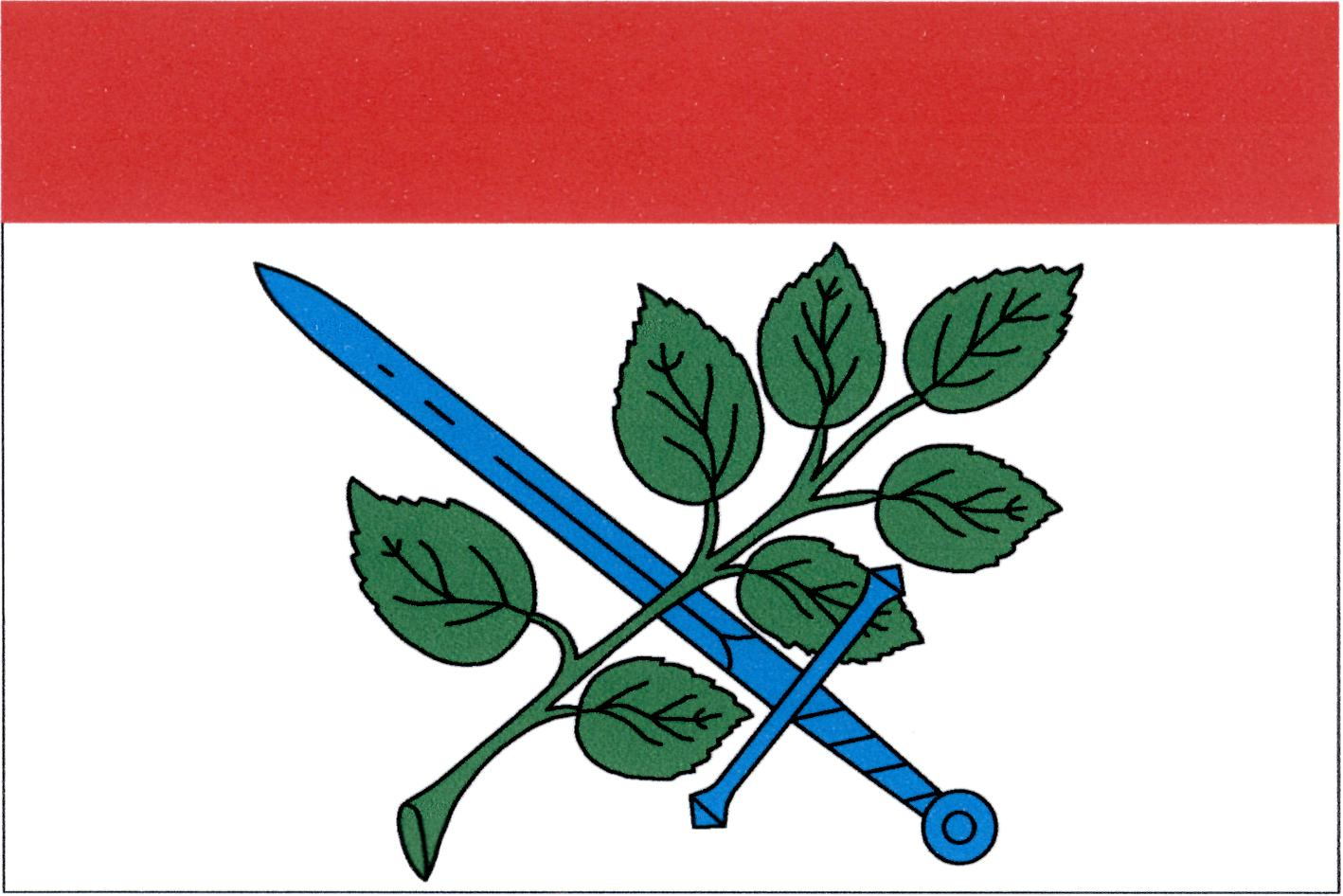
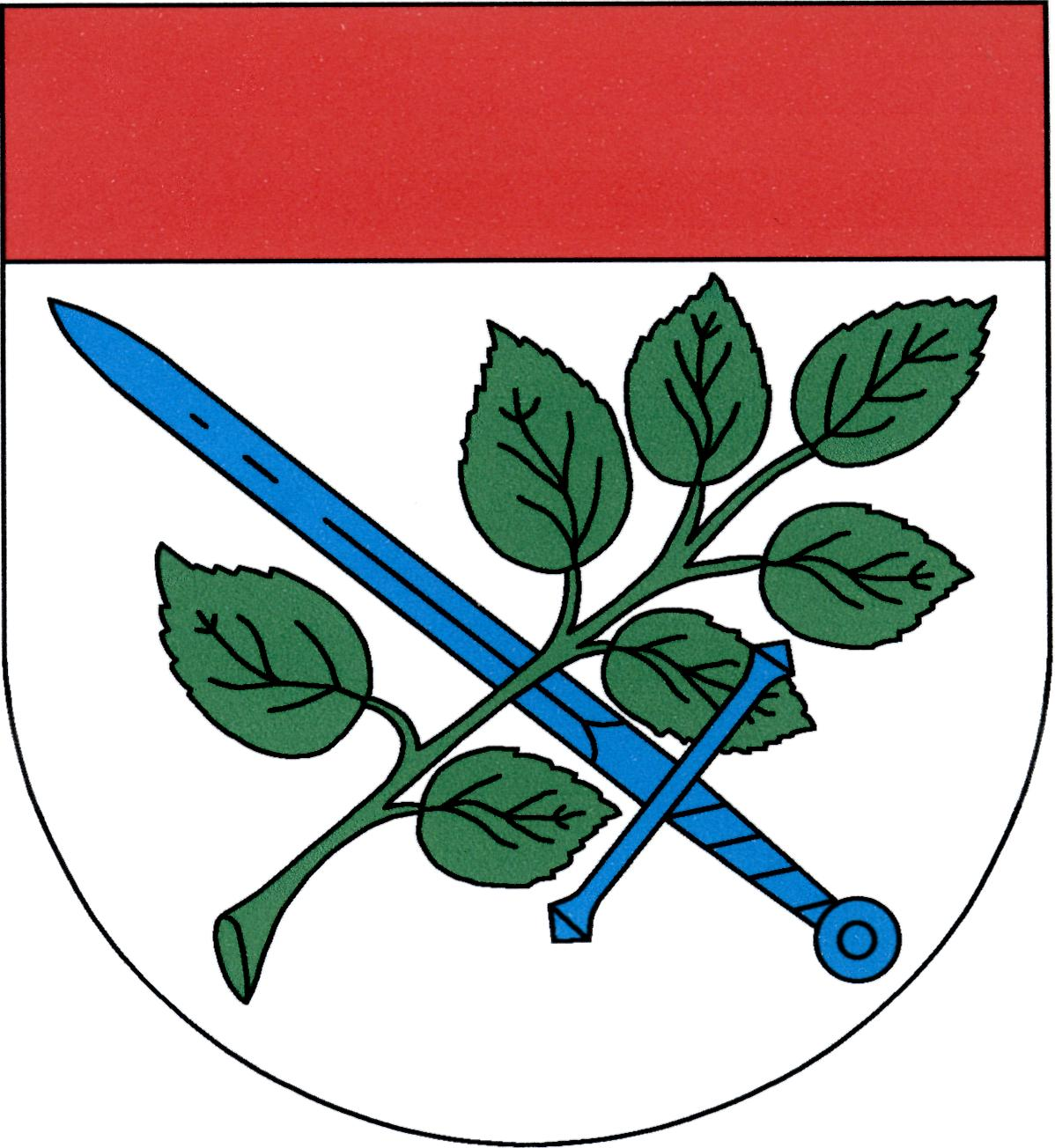
- Flag Coat of arms

- Location in the Czech Republic
- Coordinates: 49°37′25″N 12°57′19″E
- Country: Czech Republic
- Region: Plzeň
- District: Domažlice
- First mentioned: 1379

Area
  - Total: 16.91 km^{2} (6.53 sq mi)
- Elevation: 513 m (1,683 ft)

Population (2026-01-01)
  - Total: 227
  - Density: 13.4/km^{2} (34.8/sq mi)
- Time zone: UTC+1 (CET)
  - Summer (DST): UTC+2 (CEST)
- Postal code: 346 01
- Website: www.velkymalahov.cz

Velký Malahov is a municipality and village in Domažlice District in the Plzeň Region of the Czech Republic. It has about 200 inhabitants.

Velký Malahov lies approximately 21 kilometres (13 mi) north of Domažlice, 34 km (21 mi) south-west of Plzeň, and 118 km (73 mi) south-west of Prague.

== Administrative division ==
Velký Malahov consists of three municipal parts (in brackets population according to the 2021 census):

- Velký Malahov (123)
- Jivjany (64)
- Ostromeč (55)

== Demographics ==
Historical population
Year	Pop.	±%
1869	619	—
1880	623	+0.6%
1890	558	−10.4%
1900	623	+11.6%
1910	667	+7.1%
1921	655	−1.8%
1930	618	−5.6%
1950	292	−52.8%
1961	330	+13.0%
1970	332	+0.6%
1980	294	−11.4%
1991	268	−8.8%
2001	265	−1.1%
2011	235	−11.3%
2021	242	+3.0%
Source: Censuses
