= Semněvice =

- Municipality
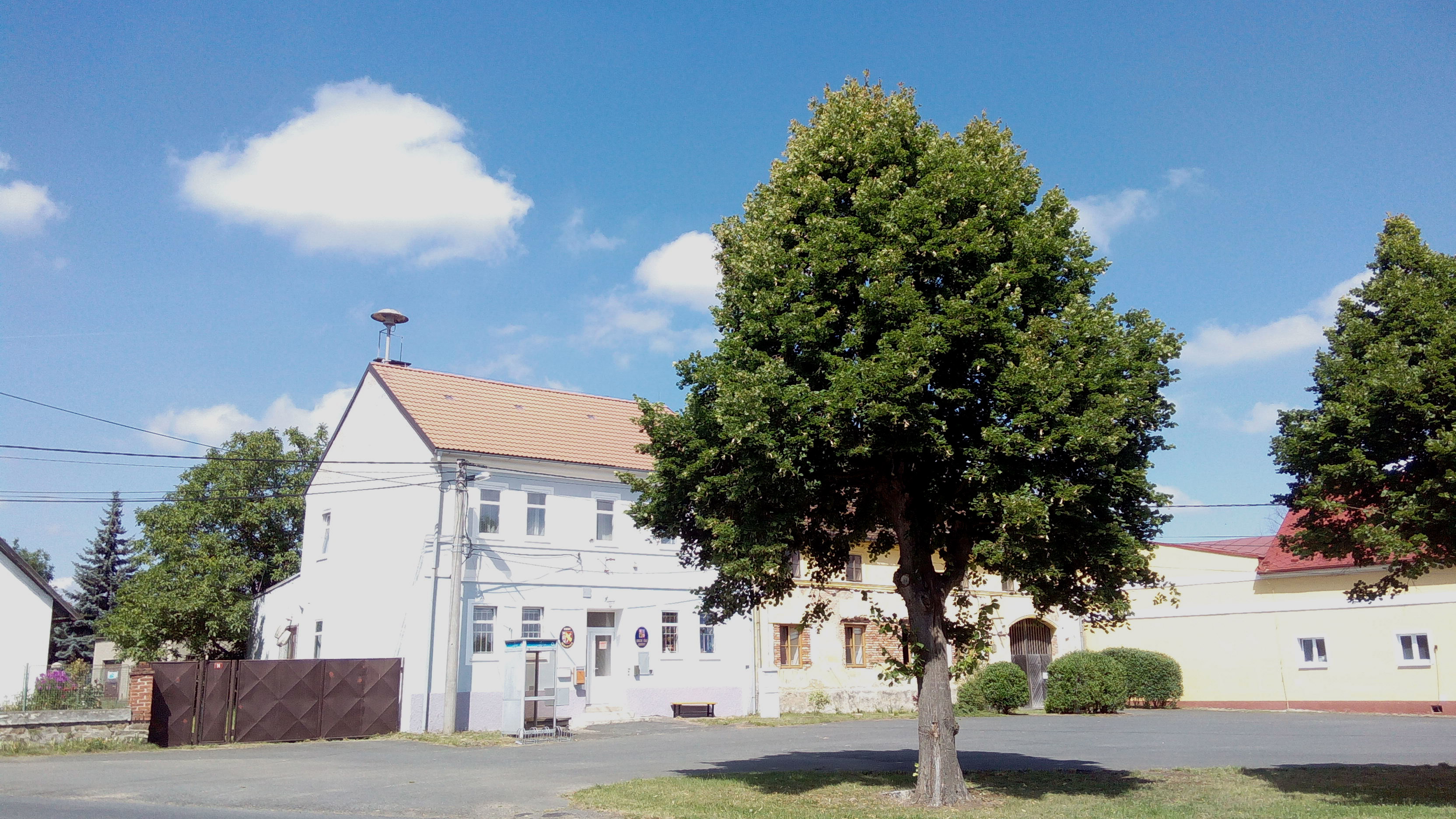
- Municipal office

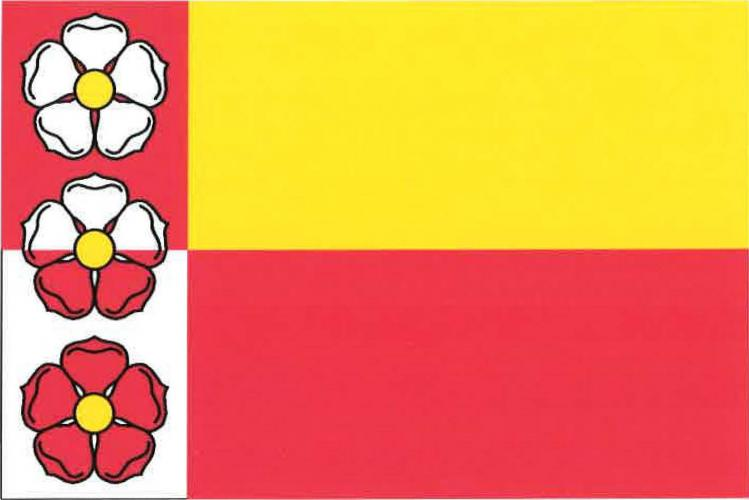
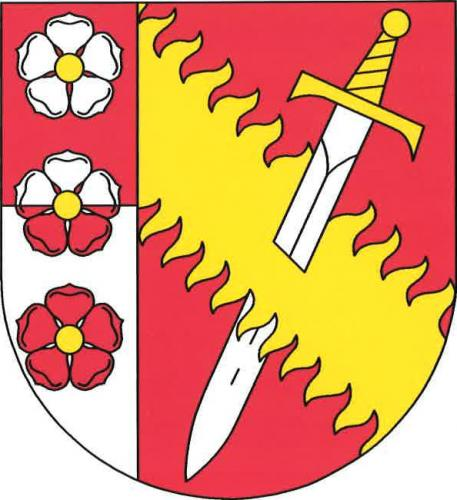
- Flag Coat of arms

- Location in the Czech Republic
- Coordinates: 49°35′52″N 12°55′45″E
- Country: Czech Republic
- Region: Plzeň
- District: Domažlice
- First mentioned: 1264

Area
  - Total: 12.03 km^{2} (4.64 sq mi)
- Elevation: 493 m (1,617 ft)

Population (2026-01-01)
  - Total: 213
  - Density: 17.7/km^{2} (45.9/sq mi)
- Time zone: UTC+1 (CET)
  - Summer (DST): UTC+2 (CEST)
- Postal code: 346 01
- Website: www.obec-semnevice.cz

Semněvice (German: Semlowitz) is a municipality and village in Domažlice District in the Plzeň Region of the Czech Republic. It has about 200 inhabitants.

Semněvice lies approximately 19 kilometres (12 mi) north of Domažlice, 36 km (22 mi) south-west of Plzeň, and 120 km (75 mi) south-west of Prague.

== Administrative division ==
Semněvice consists of three municipal parts (in brackets population according to the 2021 census):

- Semněvice (151)
- Pocinovice (39)
- Šlovice (26)

== Demographics ==
Historical population
Year	Pop.	±%
1869	476	—
1880	512	+7.6%
1890	524	+2.3%
1900	518	−1.1%
1910	559	+7.9%
1921	556	−0.5%
1930	506	−9.0%
1950	307	−39.3%
1961	230	−25.1%
1970	252	+9.6%
1980	195	−22.6%
1991	165	−15.4%
2001	153	−7.3%
2011	162	+5.9%
2021	216	+33.3%
Source: Censuses
