= Otov =

- Municipality
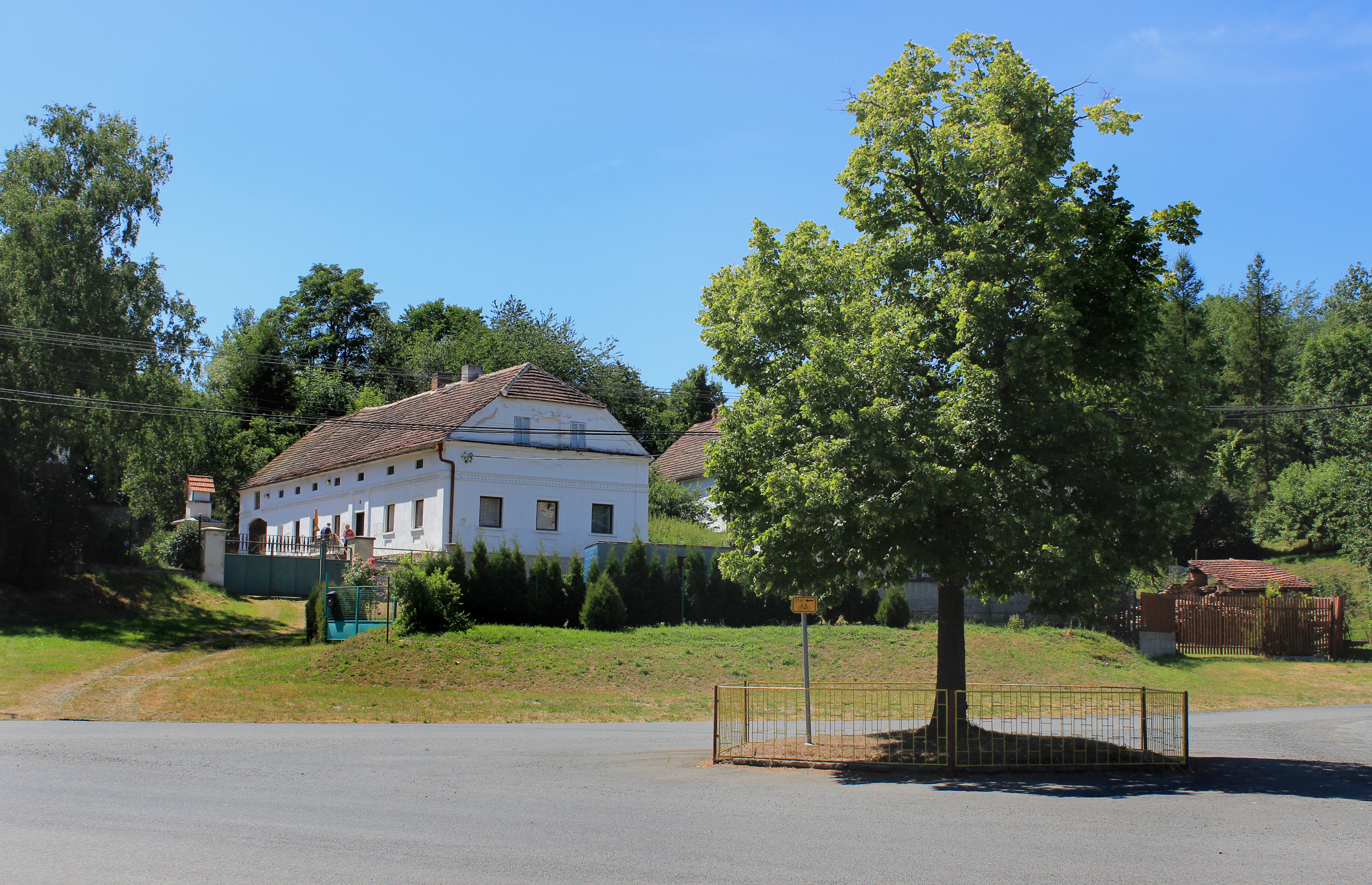
- Centre of Otov

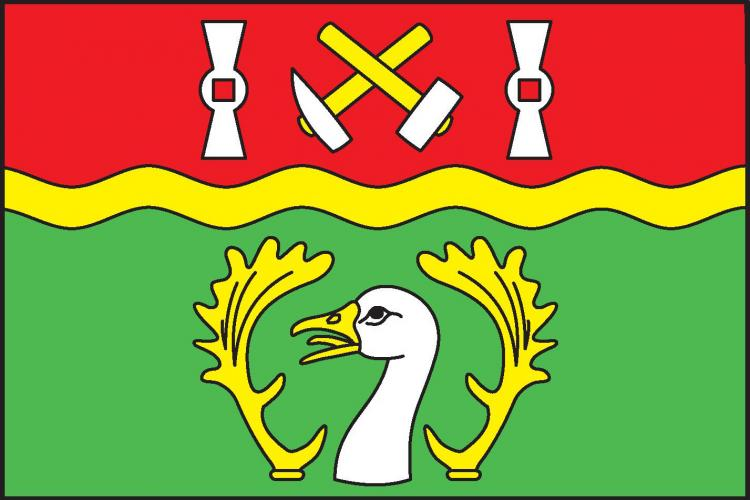
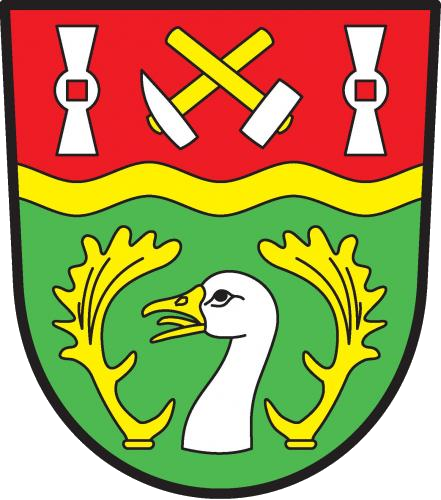
- Flag Coat of arms

- Location in the Czech Republic
- Coordinates: 49°29′12″N 12°50′33″E
- Country: Czech Republic
- Region: Plzeň
- District: Domažlice
- First mentioned: 1239

Area
  - Total: 7.11 km^{2} (2.75 sq mi)
- Elevation: 412 m (1,352 ft)

Population (2026-01-01)
  - Total: 109
  - Density: 15.3/km^{2} (39.7/sq mi)
- Time zone: UTC+1 (CET)
  - Summer (DST): UTC+2 (CEST)
- Postal code: 345 22
- Website: www.otov.cz

Otov (German: Wottawa) is a municipality and village in Domažlice District in the Plzeň Region of the Czech Republic. It has about 100 inhabitants.

Otov lies approximately 8 kilometres (5 mi) north-west of Domažlice, 48 km (30 mi) south-west of Plzeň, and 132 km (82 mi) south-west of Prague.

== Demographics ==
Historical population
Year	Pop.	±%
1869	299	—
1880	309	+3.3%
1890	311	+0.6%
1900	310	−0.3%
1910	331	+6.8%
1921	350	+5.7%
1930	362	+3.4%
1950	165	−54.4%
1961	158	−4.2%
1970	106	−32.9%
1980	109	+2.8%
1991	111	+1.8%
2001	115	+3.6%
2011	85	−26.1%
2021	108	+27.1%
Source: Censuses
