= Draženov =

- Municipality
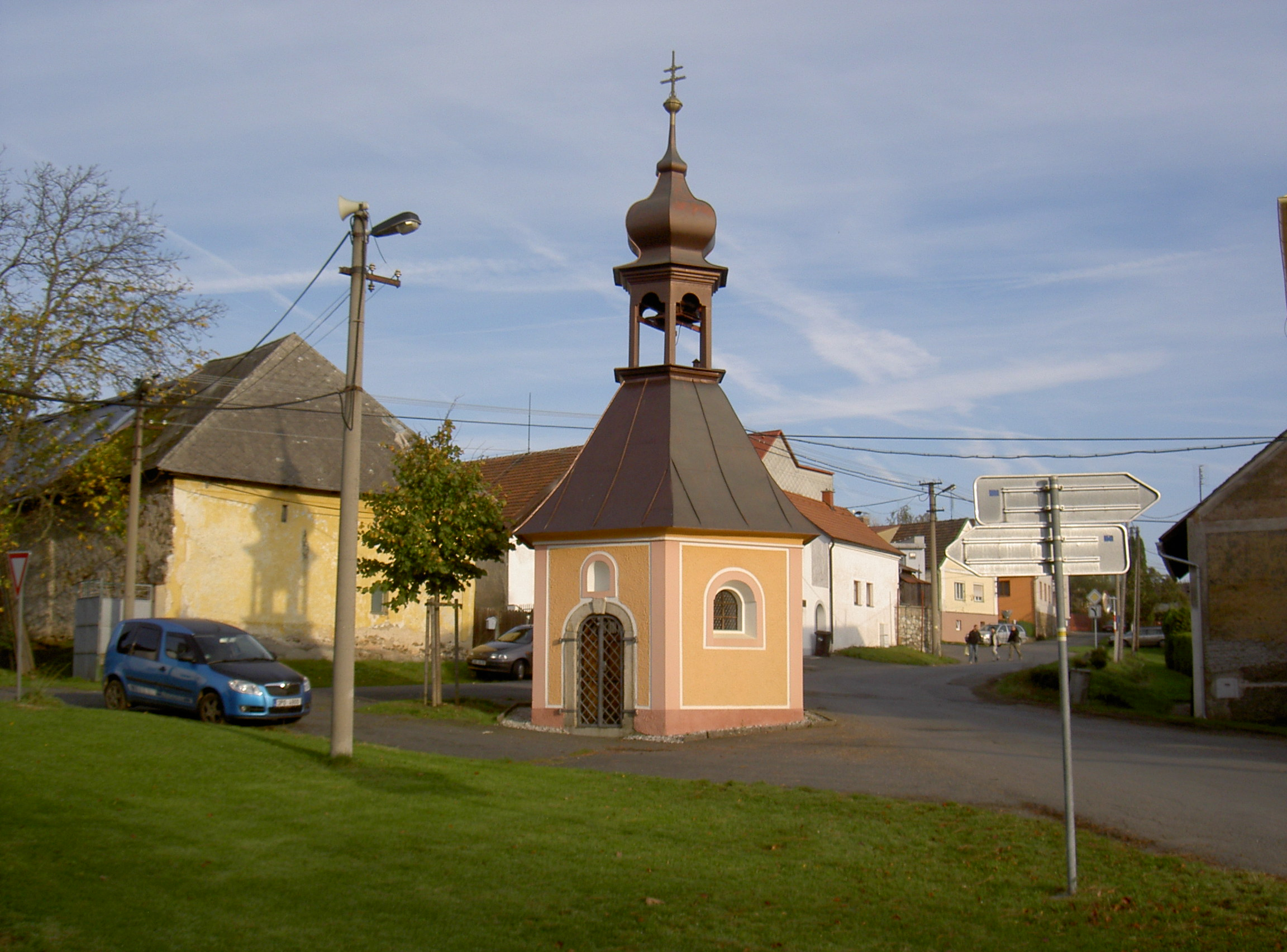
- Chapel of the Virgin Mary

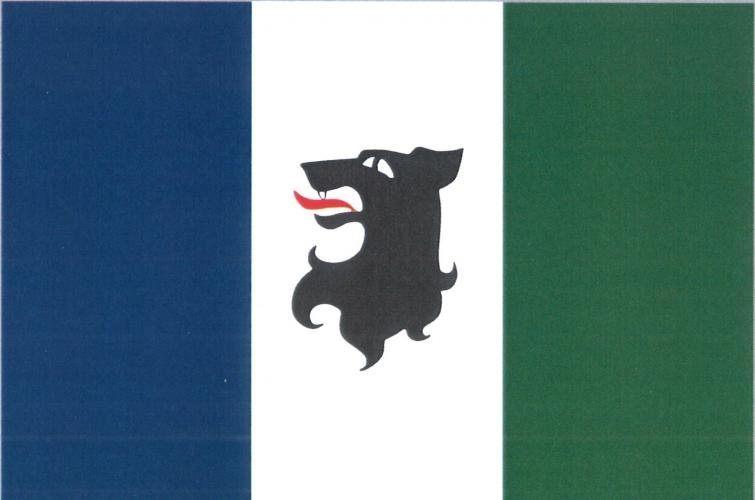
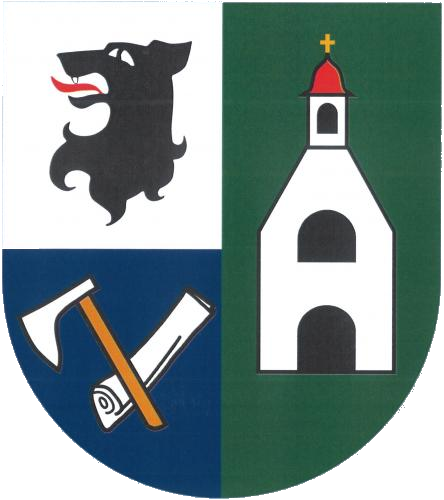
- Flag Coat of arms

- Location in the Czech Republic
- Coordinates: 49°27′21″N 12°52′22″E
- Country: Czech Republic
- Region: Plzeň
- District: Domažlice
- First mentioned: 1325

Area
  - Total: 6.72 km^{2} (2.59 sq mi)
- Elevation: 451 m (1,480 ft)

Population (2026-01-01)
  - Total: 476
  - Density: 70.8/km^{2} (183/sq mi)
- Time zone: UTC+1 (CET)
  - Summer (DST): UTC+2 (CEST)
- Postal code: 344 01
- Website: www.drazenov.cz

Draženov is a municipality and village in Domažlice District in the Plzeň Region of the Czech Republic. It has about 500 inhabitants.

Draženov lies approximately 5 kilometres (3 mi) west of Domažlice, 50 km (31 mi) south-west of Plzeň, and 133 km (83 mi) south-west of Prague.

== Demographics ==
Historical population
Year	Pop.	±%
1869	461	—
1880	472	+2.4%
1890	433	−8.3%
1900	434	+0.2%
1910	438	+0.9%
1921	444	+1.4%
1930	437	−1.6%
1950	311	−28.8%
1961	293	−5.8%
1970	262	−10.6%
1980	293	+11.8%
1991	369	+25.9%
2001	375	+1.6%
2011	392	+4.5%
2021	407	+3.8%
Source: Censuses
