= Hora Svatého Václava =

- Municipality
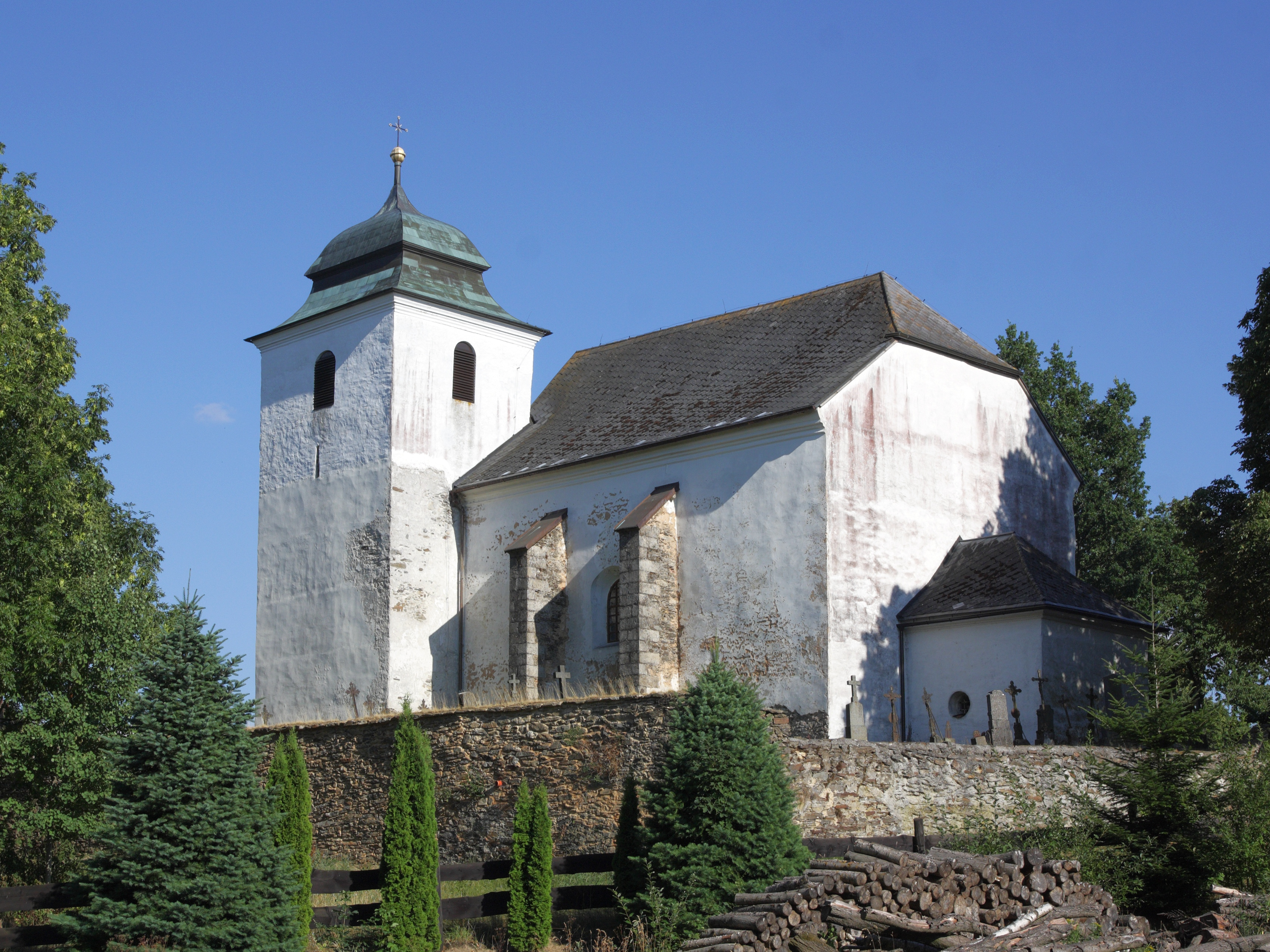
- Church of Saint Wenceslaus

- Location in the Czech Republic
- Coordinates: 49°31′8″N 12°44′24″E
- Country: Czech Republic
- Region: Plzeň
- District: Domažlice
- First mentioned: 1239

Area
  - Total: 7.65 km^{2} (2.95 sq mi)
- Elevation: 572 m (1,877 ft)

Population (2026-01-01)
  - Total: 63
  - Density: 8.2/km^{2} (21/sq mi)
- Time zone: UTC+1 (CET)
  - Summer (DST): UTC+2 (CEST)
- Postal code: 345 22
- Website: www.horasvatehovaclava.cz

Hora Svatého Václava (German: Berg) is a municipality and village in Domažlice District in the Plzeň Region of the Czech Republic. It has about 60 inhabitants.

Hora Svatého Václava lies approximately 17 kilometres (11 mi) north-west of Domažlice, 53 km (33 mi) south-west of Plzeň, and 137 km (85 mi) south-west of Prague.

== Administrative division ==
Hora Svatého Václava consists of three municipal parts (in brackets population according to the 2021 census):

- Hora Svatého Václava (24)
- Načetín (15)
- Šidlákov (18)

== Demographics ==
Historical population
Year	Pop.	±%
1869	648	—
1880	585	−9.7%
1890	595	+1.7%
1900	556	−6.6%
1910	600	+7.9%
1921	598	−0.3%
1930	554	−7.4%
1950	200	−63.9%
1961	184	−8.0%
1970	110	−40.2%
1980	86	−21.8%
1991	79	−8.1%
2001	71	−10.1%
2011	59	−16.9%
2021	57	−3.4%
Source: Censuses
