= Štichov =

- Municipality
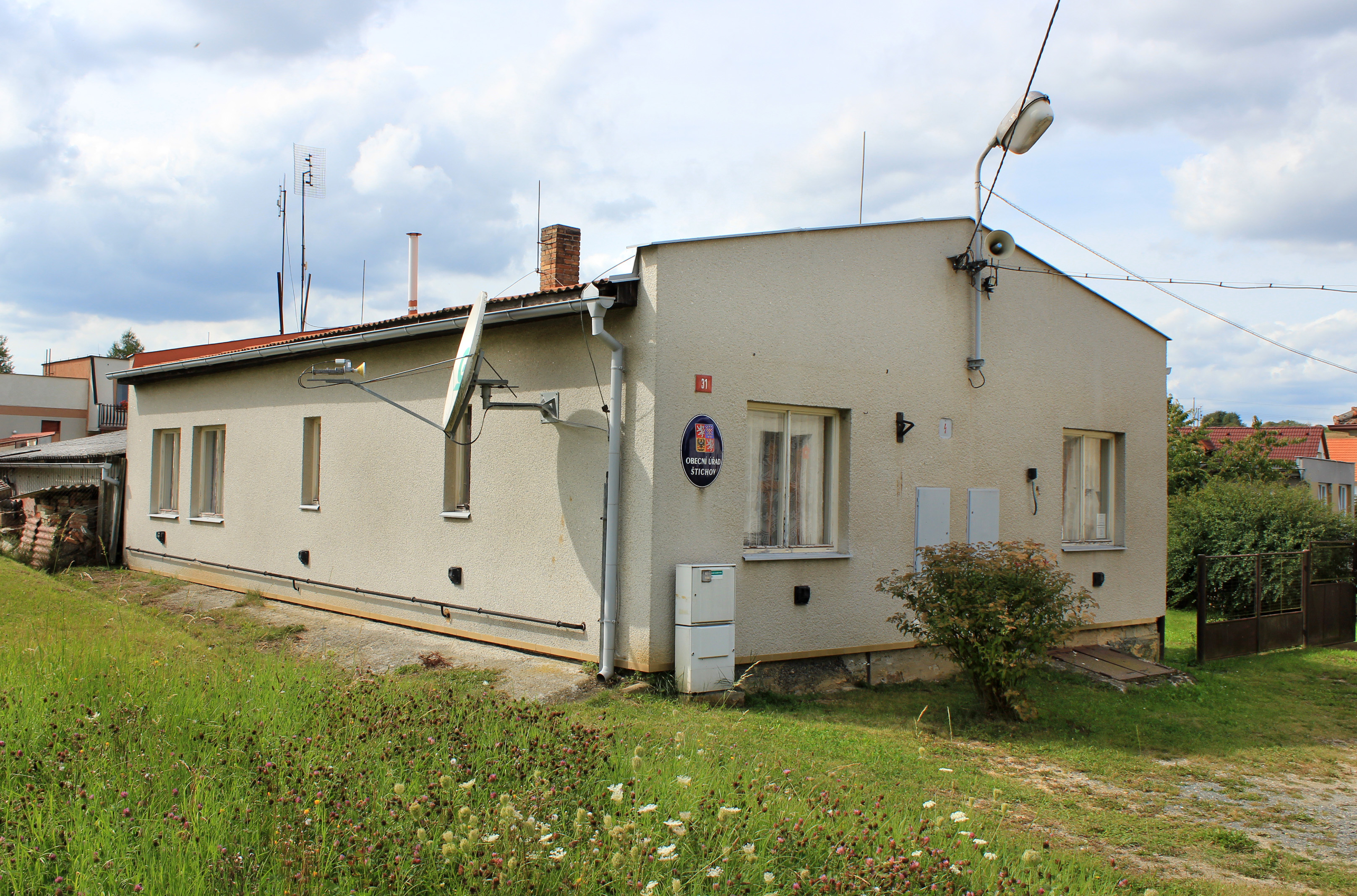
- Municipal office

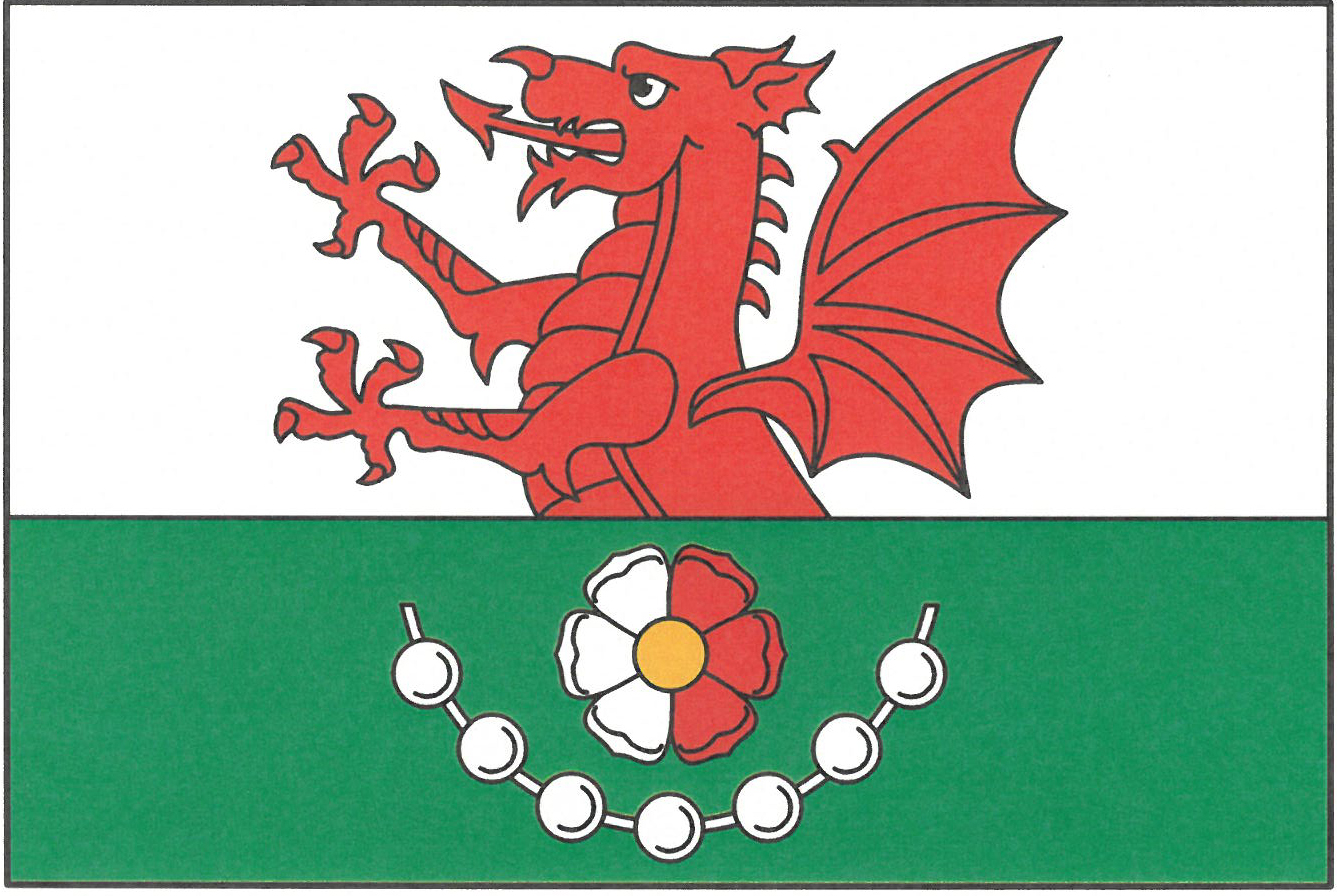
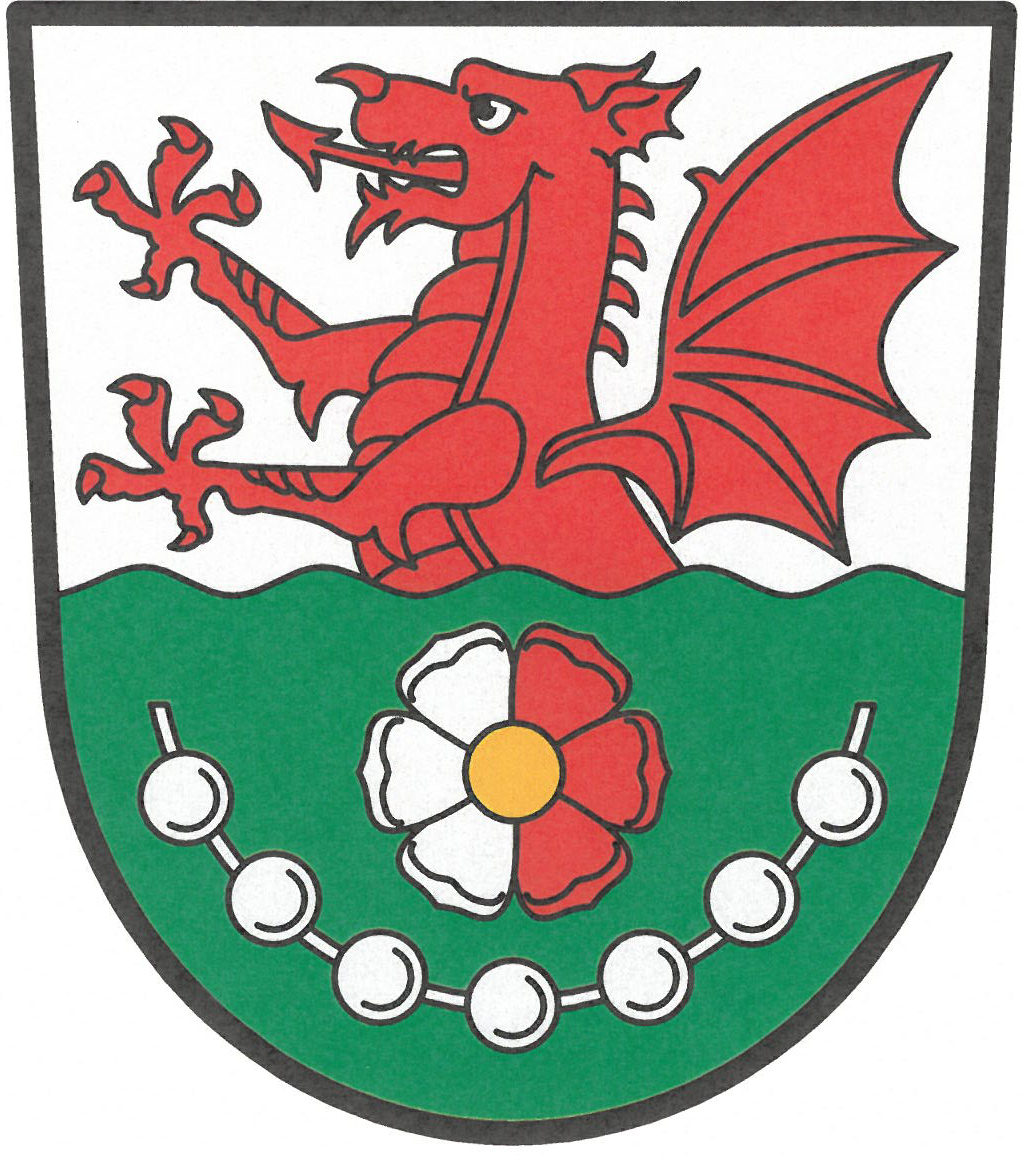
- Flag Coat of arms

- Location in the Czech Republic
- Coordinates: 49°35′6″N 13°2′56″E
- Country: Czech Republic
- Region: Plzeň
- District: Plzeň-South
- First mentioned: 1379

Area
  - Total: 3.92 km^{2} (1.51 sq mi)
- Elevation: 392 m (1,286 ft)

Population (2026-01-01)
  - Total: 83
  - Density: 21/km^{2} (55/sq mi)
- Time zone: UTC+1 (CET)
  - Summer (DST): UTC+2 (CEST)
- Postal code: 345 62
- Website: stichov.cz

Štichov is a municipality and village in Plzeň-South District in the Plzeň Region of the Czech Republic. It has about 80 inhabitants.

Štichov lies approximately 19 kilometres (12 mi) north-east of Domažlice, 30 km (19 mi) south-west of Plzeň, and 114 km (71 mi) south-west of Prague.

== History ==
The first written mention of Štichov is from 1379.

From 1 January 2021, Štichov is no longer a part of Domažlice District and belongs to Plzeň-South District.

== Demographics ==
Historical population
Year	Pop.	±%
1869	191	—
1880	227	+18.8%
1890	235	+3.5%
1900	219	−6.8%
1910	245	+11.9%
1921	260	+6.1%
1930	261	+0.4%
1950	182	−30.3%
1961	161	−11.5%
1970	133	−17.4%
1980	98	−26.3%
1991	96	−2.0%
2001	87	−9.4%
2011	71	−18.4%
2021	92	+29.6%
Source: Censuses
