= Jan Krautwurm =

Czech labourer and politician

- Born: 12 December 1882; Domažlice, Bohemia, Austria-Hungary
- Died: 26 March 1942 (aged 59); Dachau concentration camp, Nazi Germany
- Occupations: Anti-fascist and editor

Jan Krautwurm (12 December 1882 – 26 March 1942) was a Czech labourer, politician, and victim of German occupation. He was one of the organisers of the anti-Habsburg and anti-war resistance at the Škoda Works in Plzeň. He was one of the founders of the Communist Party of Czechoslovakia in the Plzeň region, as well as head of the editorial board of the daily newspaper Pravda.

Krautwurm worked as a stoker at the Škoda Works, and later earned a living as a door-to-door salesman. In 1923, he was listed as the owner of a grocery store dealing in colonial goods. Initially as a member of the Czechoslovak Social Democratic Workers' Party, when the Marxist-Leninist "left" platform of the party split off in 1921, he founded the branch of the newly formed Communist Party in Plzeň. He was later elected in 1925 to the Plzeň City Council (with responsibility for the Inventory Office) and on the Communist Party's regional committee.

Following the occupation of the city by German forces in 1938, he was arrested by the Gestapo and imprisoned in the Orainenburg and Dachau concentration camps, where he later died. He was also a member of the Sokol.

== Personal life ==
On 26 February 1906 he married Cecílie Ludvíková (born in 1884). Together they had three children: daughters Anna (born in 1908) and Vlasta (born in 1914), and a son, Miroslav (born in 1918).

== Legacy ==
In Plzeň, the square Náměstí Jana Krautwurma was named after him in the newly built housing development in Slovany (formerly Náměstí Budovatelů). Between 1946 and 1990, a memorial plaque in his honour was located in the Doubravka district of Plzeň. After the Velvet Revolution in 1989, his memorial plaque was removed and the square renamed to Náměstí Heliodora Píky.
