= František Michl =

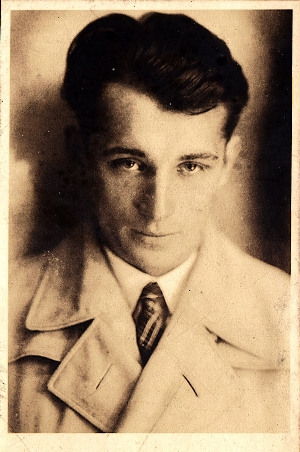
- Michl in 1930
- Born: 20 November 1901; Domažlice, Bohemia, Austria-Hungary
- Died: 4 July 1977 (aged 75); Domažlice, Czechoslovakia
- Education: Academy of Fine Arts, Prague
- Notable work: Škoda Logo "The Winged Arrow"

František Michl (20 November 1901 – 4 June 1977) was a Czech painter and graphic artist. He was the original designer of the Škoda Works emblem, the "Winged Arrow". He was imprisoned in Pankrác Prison, and the concentration camps Terezín and Flossenbürg after his arrest by Nazis for an anti-fascist demonstration at Domažlice. After the war, he was arrested in the Czechoslovak Socialist Republic for listening to the anticommunist Radio Liberty.

== Biography ==
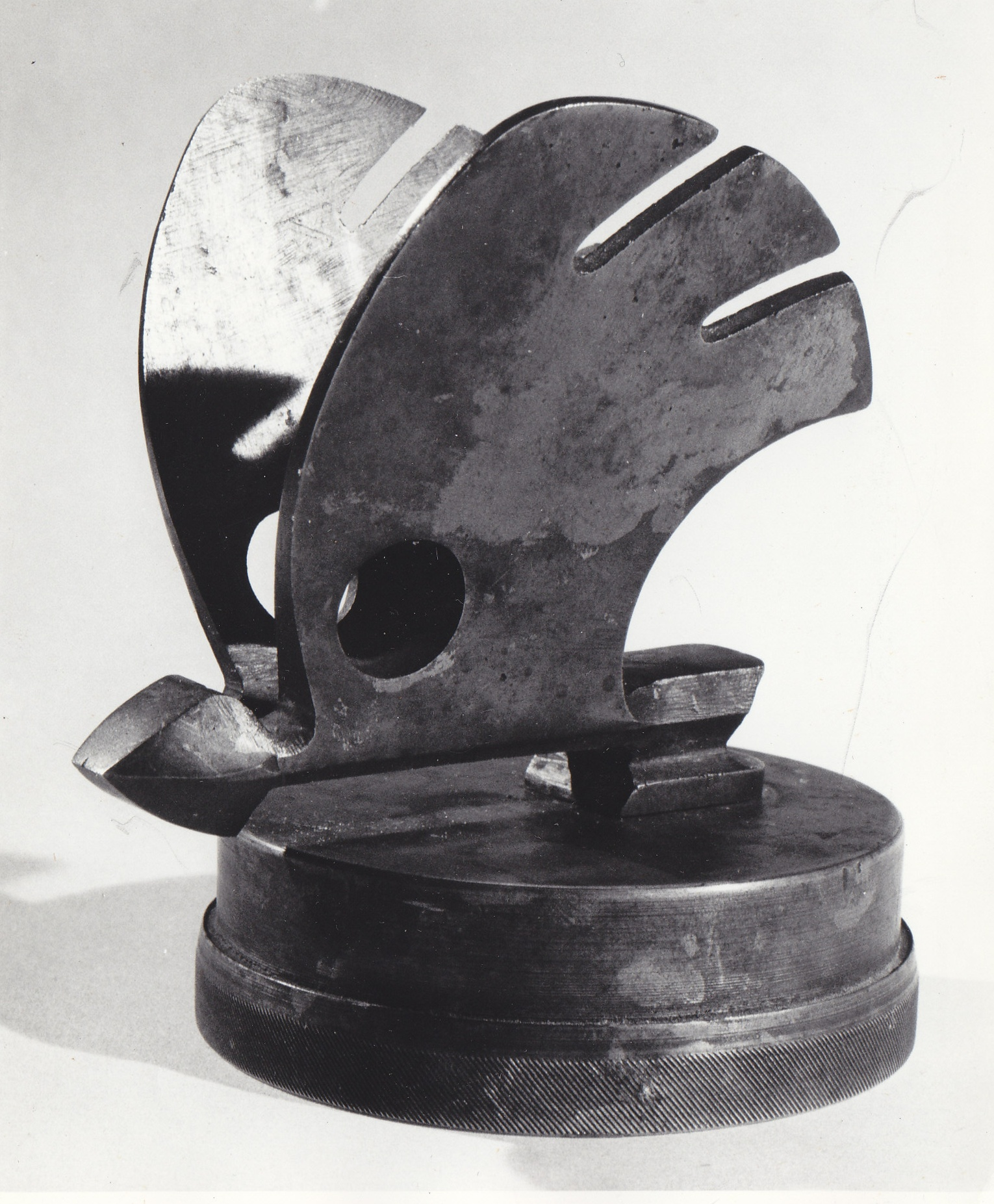
The Škoda Works emblem "The Winged Arrow": The first three-dimensional prototype. Design: František Michl, realization: Vladimír Bretschneider. Bronze, around 1923. Private collection

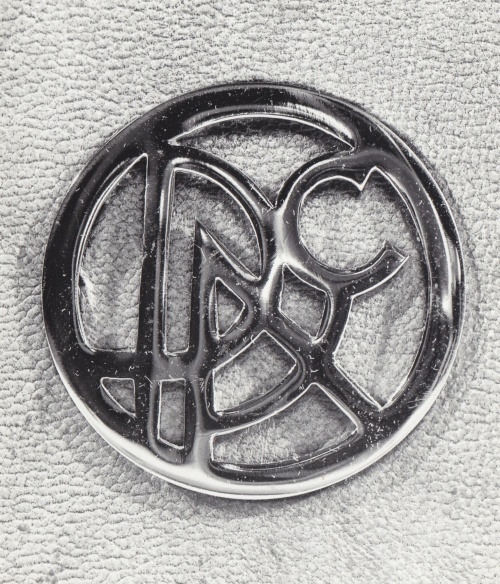
"Podčerchov Automobile Club". Metal badge, c. 1920–1935

Michl was born in Domažlice, in a brush maker's family. After receiving a financial award for winning the competition of Škoda Works in Plzeň for a new emblem with his design "The Winged Arrow", young Michl was able to study at the Academy of Fine Arts in Prague, to build his own painting studio in Domažlice, and to travel. He studied at the Academy of Fine Arts in Prague between 1925 and 1928, with Otakar Nejedlý. Between 1922 and 1935, he undertook a series of study trips, especially to France, Germany, Dalmatia, Greece, Italy, North Africa, Corsica, Dresden, the Netherlands, the Alps, Styria and Bulgaria.

In 1927, he became a member of several Czech artists' associations. He received three awards from the Czech Academy of Sciences and Arts for his contribution to Czech culture.

Michl was, among others, an organizer of the famous pilgrimage to St. Lawrence at Domažlice on 13 August 1939. This event became the largest anti-fascist demonstration during the World War II period. This was also one of the reasons for his arrest by Nazis and imprisonment in Pankrác Prison, followed by concentration camps in Terezín and Flossenbürg during 1940–1941 and 1943–1945.

After the end of the war, Michl became a cultural patron in the Domazlice district, and he was also asked to become a professor at the Academy of Arts in Prague; however, he did not accept the offer. In 1958, three of his paintings represented Czechoslovak art at the World Exhibition in Brussels.

Michl, being a free-minded and anticommunist spirit, was imprisoned in Plzeň Prison in 1961. The trial was based on the accusation that Michl listened to Radio Liberty, which was considered by the totalitarian regime as treason. His name was blacklisted and his family persecuted.

The diminished political pressure in 1967 opened new prospects for Michl's art in Czechoslovakia and abroad. In March 1968 his paintings were exhibited in Montreal. The Rullos Gallery in New York bought 165 paintings in November 1968. Unfortunately, preparation of Michl's exhibition in the London National Gallery was interrupted by the Soviet invasion in August 1968.

The time of normalization brought back the ban on Michl's name. Michl was not allowed to publicly display his art (though several illegal exhibitions, organized by his friends, took place, camouflaged under fake titles, for example "Successes of building socialism"). After his first brain stroke in 1972, which left half of his body paralyzed, Michl kept painting. It was only after his sixth stroke that Michl remained permanently bedridden until his death on 4 June 1977.

In 1991, František Michl's name was fully politically rehabilitated, and his contribution to the anti-fascist and anticommunist resistance was recognized. Michl's work, however, is still awaiting public recognition.
