= Putování slepého hada za pravdou =

Putování slepého hada za pravdou is a novel, written in German by Ladislav Klíma. It is a novel written by Ladislav Klíma in 1917, later published in 1918 in German, it was translated into Czech by Milan Navrátil and published in 2002. A play based on the book was performed at Prague's Studio Ypsilon in 2007.
