= Vlkanov (Domažlice District) =

- Municipality
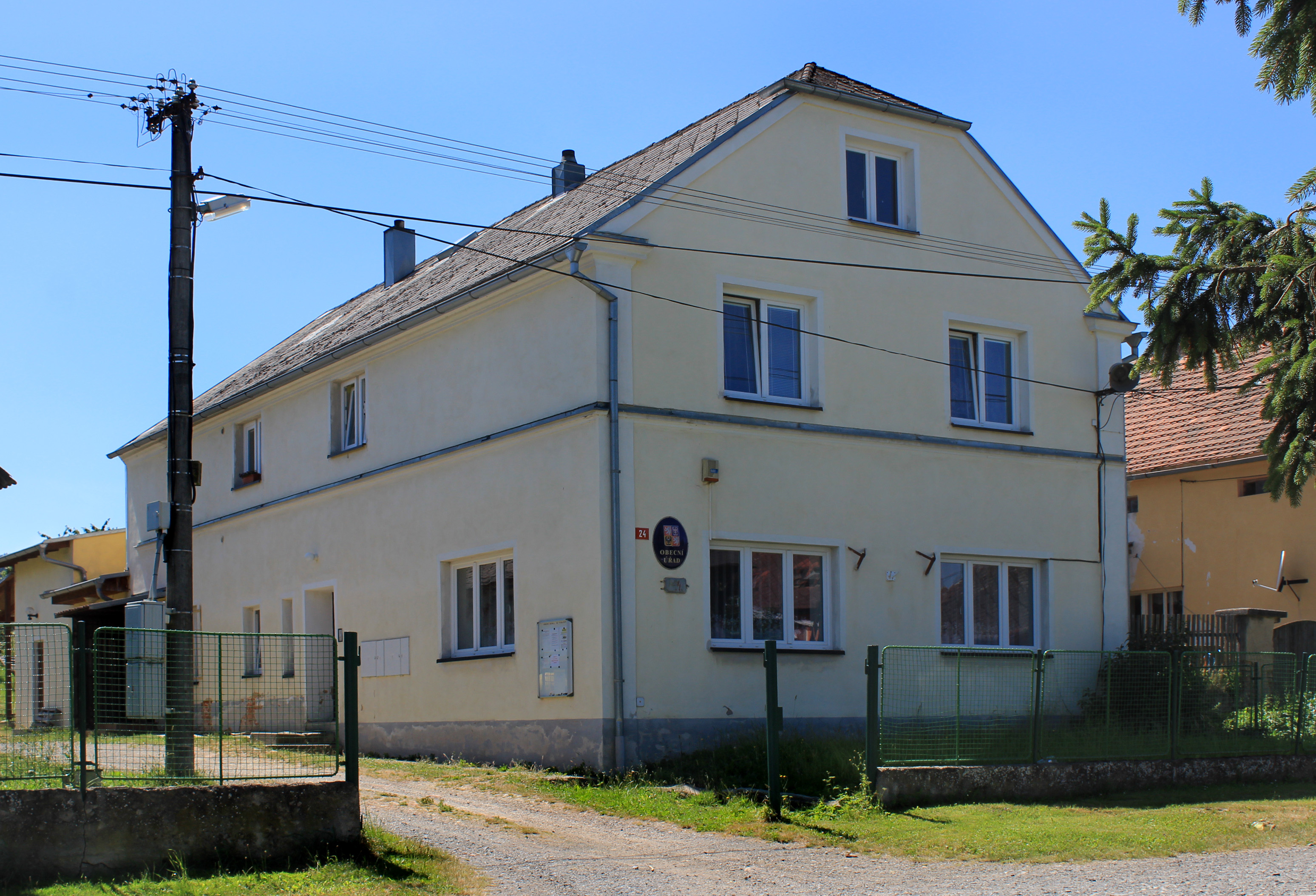
- Municipal office

- Location in the Czech Republic
- Coordinates: 49°29′19″N 12°48′19″E
- Country: Czech Republic
- Region: Plzeň
- District: Domažlice
- First mentioned: 1361

Area
  - Total: 4.29 km^{2} (1.66 sq mi)
- Elevation: 448 m (1,470 ft)

Population (2026-01-01)
  - Total: 123
  - Density: 28.7/km^{2} (74.3/sq mi)
- Time zone: UTC+1 (CET)
  - Summer (DST): UTC+2 (CEST)
- Postal code: 345 22
- Website: vlkanov.com

Vlkanov (German: Wilkenau) is a municipality and village in Domažlice District in the Plzeň Region of the Czech Republic. It has about 100 inhabitants.

Vlkanov lies approximately 11 kilometres (7 mi) north-west of Domažlice, 51 km (32 mi) south-west of Plzeň, and 134 km (83 mi) south-west of Prague.

== Demographics ==
Historical population
Year	Pop.	±%
1869	310	—
1880	300	−3.2%
1890	321	+7.0%
1900	357	+11.2%
1910	357	+0.0%
1921	364	+2.0%
1930	377	+3.6%
1950	205	−45.6%
1961	207	+1.0%
1970	147	−29.0%
1980	136	−7.5%
1991	110	−19.1%
2001	121	+10.0%
2011	123	+1.7%
2021	121	−1.6%
Source: Censuses
