= Libkov (Domažlice District) =

- Municipality
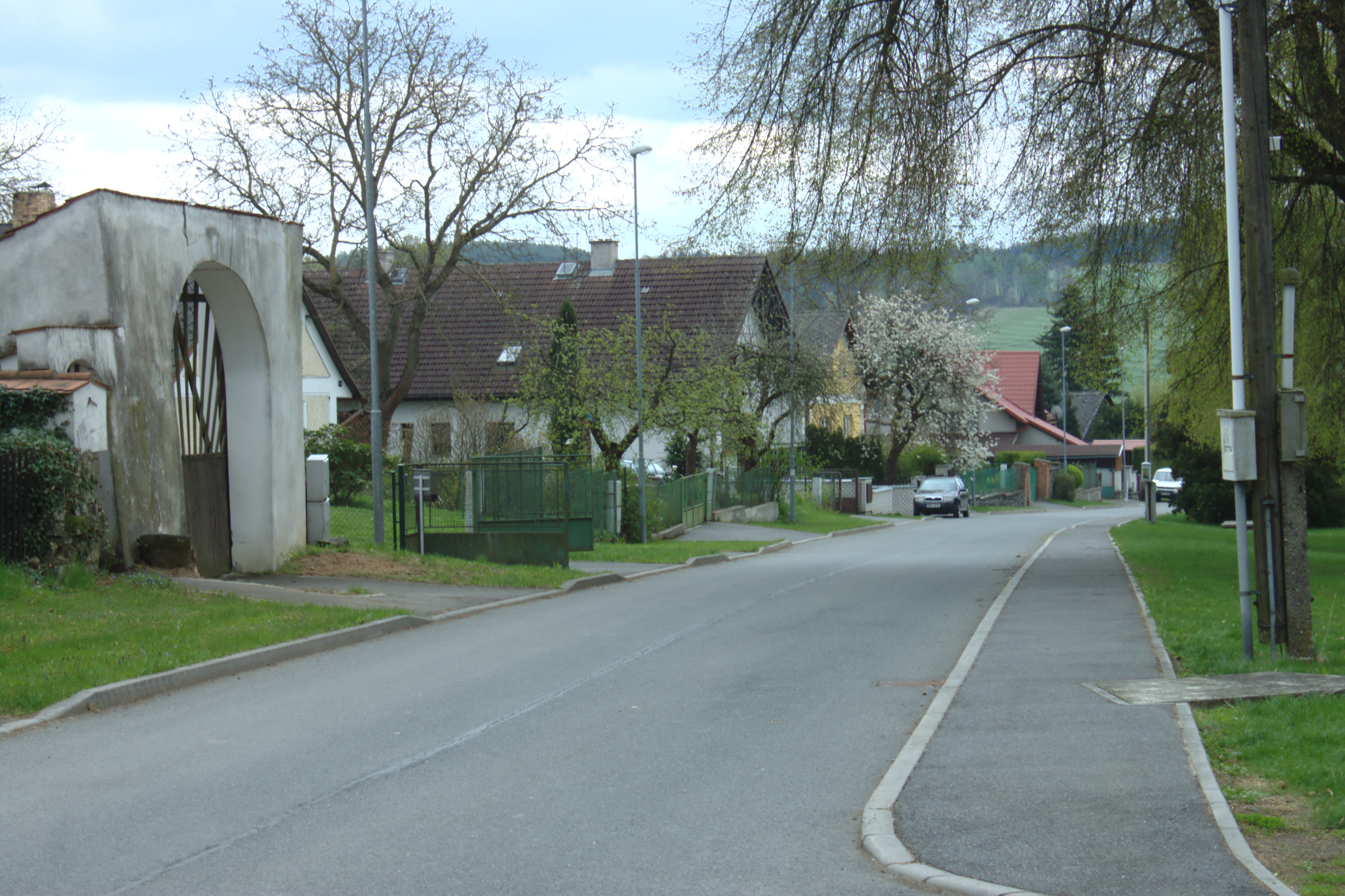
- Main road in the centre of Libkov

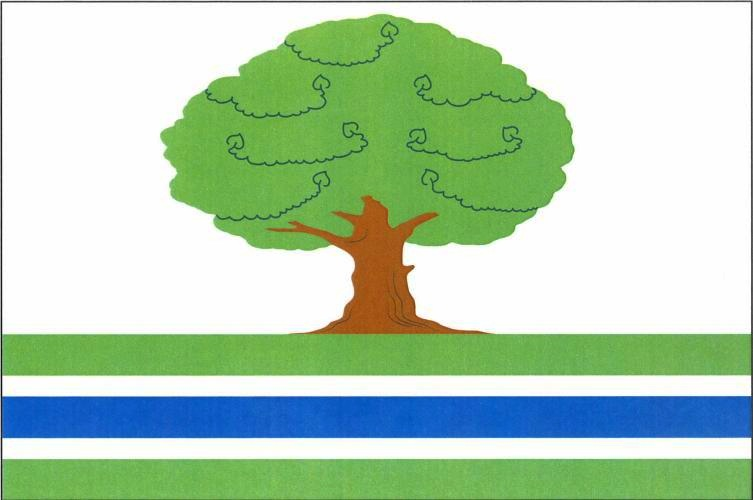
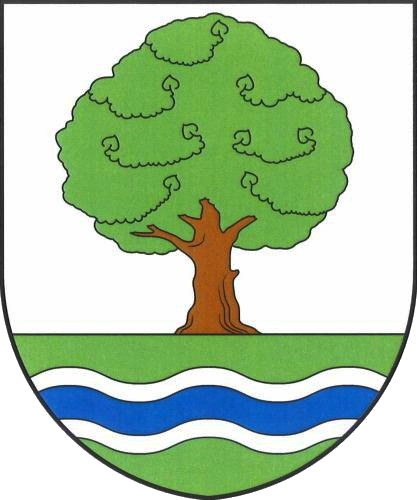
- Flag Coat of arms

- Location in the Czech Republic
- Coordinates: 49°21′59″N 13°8′4″E
- Country: Czech Republic
- Region: Plzeň
- District: Domažlice
- First mentioned: 1379

Area
  - Total: 4.12 km^{2} (1.59 sq mi)
- Elevation: 568 m (1,864 ft)

Population (2026-01-01)
  - Total: 125
  - Density: 30.3/km^{2} (78.6/sq mi)
- Time zone: UTC+1 (CET)
  - Summer (DST): UTC+2 (CEST)
- Postal code: 345 06
- Website: www.libkov.cz

Libkov is a municipality and village in Domažlice District in the Plzeň Region of the Czech Republic. It has about 100 inhabitants.

Libkov lies approximately 17 kilometres (11 mi) south-east of Domažlice, 46 km (29 mi) south-west of Plzeň, and 123 km (76 mi) south-west of Prague.

== Demographics ==
Historical population
Year	Pop.	±%
1869	327	—
1880	292	−10.7%
1890	274	−6.2%
1900	261	−4.7%
1910	244	−6.5%
1921	259	+6.1%
1930	223	−13.9%
1950	170	−23.8%
1961	142	−16.5%
1970	116	−18.3%
1980	140	+20.7%
1991	113	−19.3%
2001	111	−1.8%
2011	115	+3.6%
2021	118	+2.6%
Source: Censuses
