= Ladislav Klíma =

Czech philosopher and novelist (1878-1928)

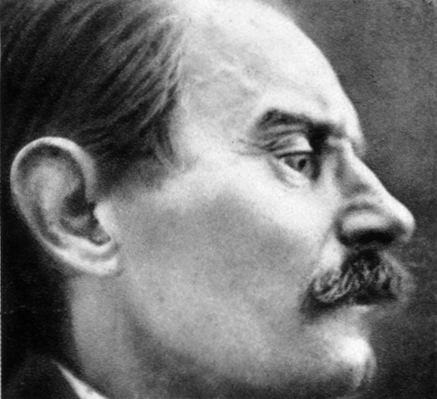
- Ladislav Klíma in 1928
- Born: 22 August 1878; Domažlice, Austria-Hungary
- Died: 19 February 1928 (aged 49); Prague, Czechoslovakia

Philosophical work
- Era: 20th-century philosophy
- Region: Western philosophy
- School: Subjective idealism; Philosophical pessimism
- Main interests: Metaphysics
- Notable ideas: egodeism

Ladislav Klíma (22 August 1878 – 19 April 1928) was a Czech philosopher and novelist. He was influenced by George Berkeley, Arthur Schopenhauer and Friedrich Nietzsche. His philosophy is referred to varyingly as existentialism and subjective idealism.

== Life ==
Ladislav Klíma was born in Domažlice in western Bohemia. He came from a moderately wealthy family. After expulsion from the school system in 1895 for allegedly insulting the State, the Church, and — out of what he described as "historical analphabetism" — the Habsburgs, he lived alternately in Tyrol, Zürich, and Prague. As part of his philosophy he only ever took on short term work. For a time he also lived off occasional royalties from his publications and the periodic generosity of his friends. While only part of Klíma's work was published before his death, many manuscripts were edited posthumously, among which were his stories and letters. Many manuscripts he destroyed himself. Klíma spent the later part of his life living in a hotel, shining shoes for a living, drinking spirits and eating vermin. Klíma died of tuberculosis and is buried in Prague.

== Work ==
Klíma rejected the norms of contemporary Czech society in both the way he lived and in what he wrote. Culture, moral values and the world itself are all rejected and reality is subjected to the will of the individual. Much of Klíma's philosophy is expressed in "World as Consciousness and Nothing" ("Svět jako vědomí a nic", 1904). He took ideas from his philosophical predecessors to the extreme and tried to incorporate them into his practical life. For Berkeley, each object exists only because it is perceived, to be is to be perceived. Klíma takes this a stage further and suggests that the individual creates the world with his own will.

Where the highest achievement for Schopenhauer is the man who denied his will, Klíma conversely suggests that the realization of one’s own will is the primary achievement. This brings Klíma close to Nietzsche with his will to power liberating itself from the bounds of the bourgeois world and affirming itself.

Klíma's individuality lies not only in his conception of philosophy, but also in his attempt to conform to it in his personal life. His autobiographical writings illustrate his attempts to grasp his own power and to shout his "Deus sum" ("I am God"). He tested his own deity in a life without any money, and in non-conformism that rejected all conventions, including a job. All this was to lead Klíma to control of self. However, Klíma also had friends and patrons who supported him in difficulties. Utrpení knížete Sternenhocha ('The Sufferings of Prince Sternenhoch': Prague 1928) is his most famous novel. In a series of journal entries, the book chronicles the descent into madness of Prince Sternenhoch, who moves from the life of a nobleman to a life filled with suffering, eccentricity, bouts of madness and self-torment. Having sunk to the lowest level, he eventually attains an ultimate state of bliss and salvation.

== Writings ==
- Svět jako vědomí a nic, Prague 1904 (The World as Consciousness and Nothing)
- Traktáty a diktáty, Prague 1922 (Tractates and Dictations)
- Matěj Poctivý, Prague 1922 (Matthew the Honest) - a drama (written together with Arnošt Dvořák)
- Vteřina a věčnost, Prague 1927 (A Second and Eternity)
- Utrpení knížete Sternenhocha, Prague 1928, 2004 (The Sufferings of Prince Sternenhoch)
- Slavná Nemesis, Prague 1932, 2002 (Glorious Nemesis) - a novella and a collection of stories
- Vlastní životopis filosofa L.K., Prague 1937 (The Autobiography of the Philosopher L.K.)
- Lidská tragikomedie, first published 1991 (The Human Tragicomedy) – philosophical drama
- Sebrané spisy IV. - Velký roman; Torst, Prague 1996 (The Collected Works IV. - The Great Novel)
- Putování slepého hada za pravdou; Volvox Globator, Prague 2003 (The Pilgrimage of a Blind Snake to the Truth) - written originally in German together with Franz Böhler
- Sebrané spisy I. - Mea; Torst, Prague 2005 (The Collected Works I. - Mea)
- Sebrané spisy II. - Hominibus; Torst, Prague 2006 (The Collected Works II. - Hominibus)
