= Vlkanov (Havlíčkův Brod District) =

- Municipality
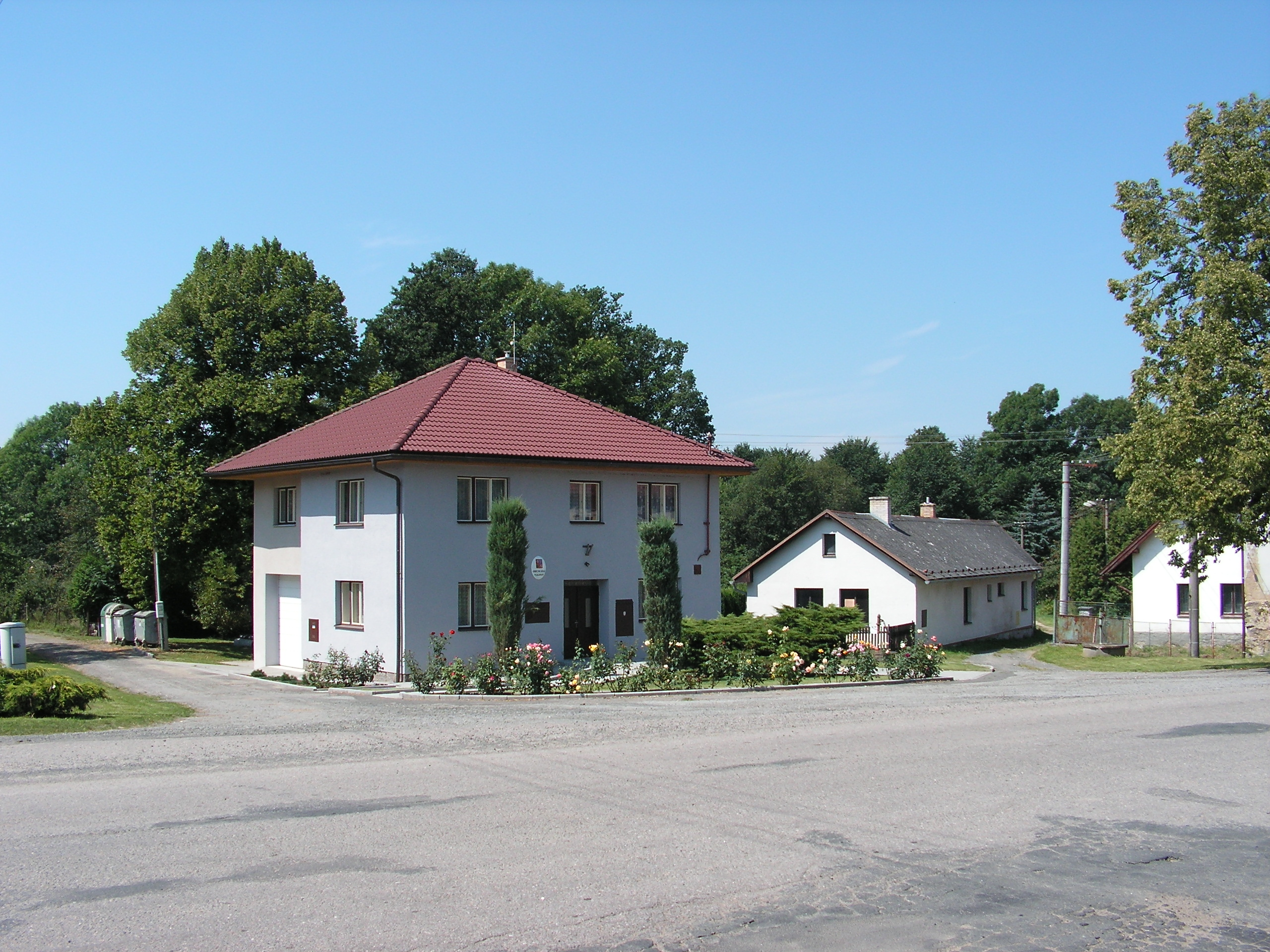
- Municipal office

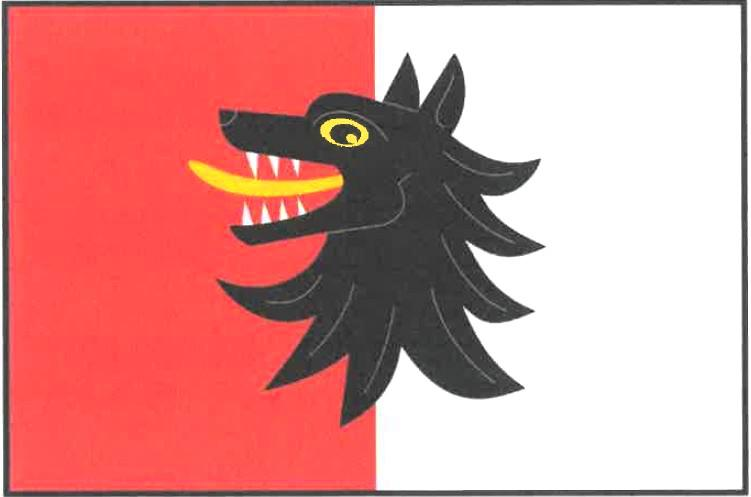
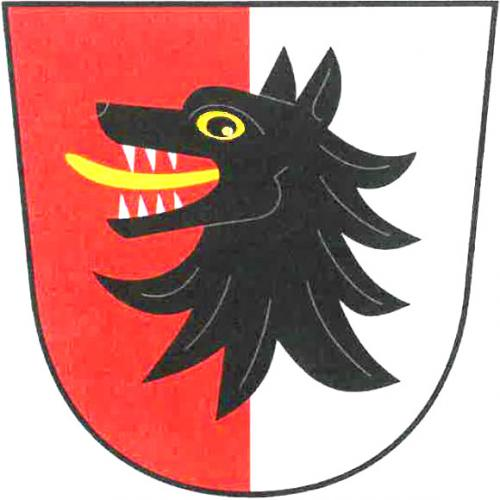
- Flag Coat of arms

- Location in the Czech Republic
- Coordinates: 49°42′56″N 15°21′24″E
- Country: Czech Republic
- Region: Vysočina
- District: Havlíčkův Brod
- First mentioned: 1591

Area
  - Total: 2.72 km^{2} (1.05 sq mi)
- Elevation: 513 m (1,683 ft)

Population (2026-01-01)
  - Total: 44
  - Density: 16/km^{2} (42/sq mi)
- Time zone: UTC+1 (CET)
  - Summer (DST): UTC+2 (CEST)
- Postal code: 582 91
- Website: www.vlkanov.cz

Vlkanov (German: Wilkanow) is a municipality and village in Havlíčkův Brod District in the Vysočina Region of the Czech Republic. It has about 40 inhabitants.

Vlkanov lies approximately 21 kilometres (13 mi) north-west of Havlíčkův Brod, 40 km (25 mi) north-west of Jihlava, and 79 km (49 mi) south-east of Prague.

== Demographics ==
Historical population
Year	Pop.	±%
1869	193	—
1880	195	+1.0%
1890	164	−15.9%
1900	159	−3.0%
1910	141	−11.3%
1921	149	+5.7%
1930	138	−7.4%
1950	107	−22.5%
1961	98	−8.4%
1970	91	−7.1%
1980	87	−4.4%
1991	47	−46.0%
2001	45	−4.3%
2011	53	+17.8%
2021	42	−20.8%
Source: Censuses
