= Libkov (Chrudim District) =

- Municipality
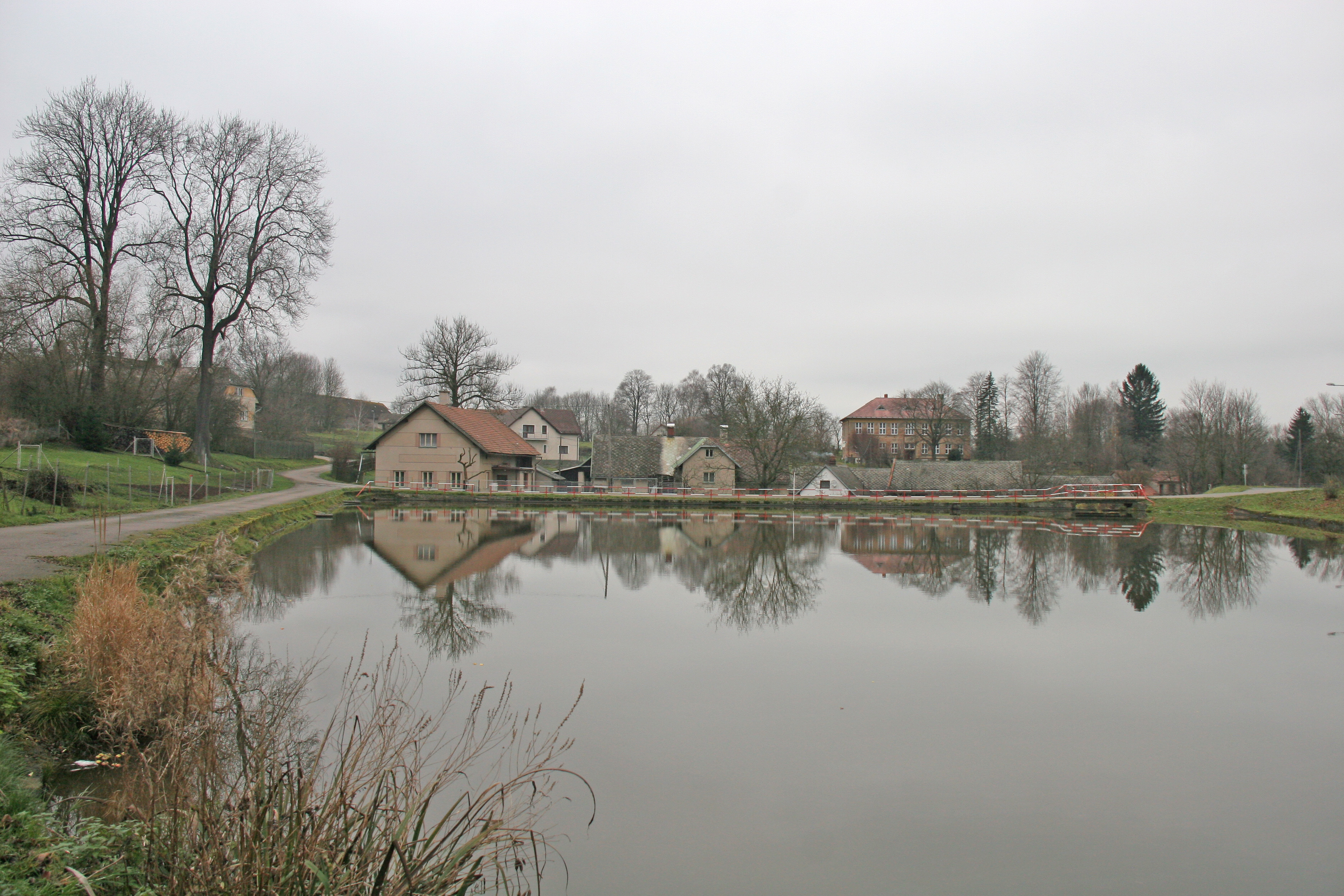
- Fishpond in the centre of Libkov

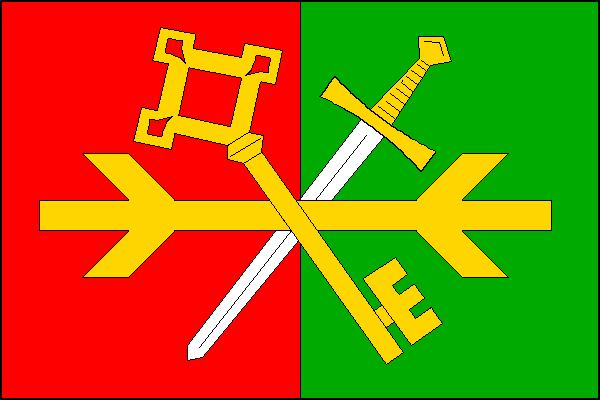
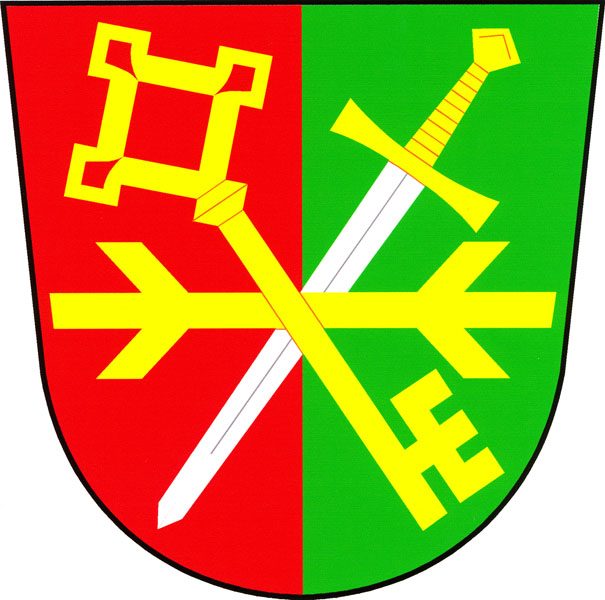
- Flag Coat of arms

- Location in the Czech Republic
- Coordinates: 49°50′30″N 15°45′23″E
- Country: Czech Republic
- Region: Pardubice
- District: Chrudim
- First mentioned: 1329

Area
  - Total: 3.81 km^{2} (1.47 sq mi)
- Elevation: 508 m (1,667 ft)

Population (2026-01-01)
  - Total: 92
  - Density: 24/km^{2} (63/sq mi)
- Time zone: UTC+1 (CET)
  - Summer (DST): UTC+2 (CEST)
- Postal code: 538 25
- Website: www.obec-libkov.cz

Libkov is a municipality and village in Chrudim District in the Pardubice Region of the Czech Republic. It has about 90 inhabitants.

== Demographics ==
Historical population
Year	Pop.	±%
1869	243	—
1880	235	−3.3%
1890	219	−6.8%
1900	220	+0.5%
1910	206	−6.4%
1921	213	+3.4%
1930	211	−0.9%
1950	159	−24.6%
1961	167	+5.0%
1970	124	−25.7%
1980	109	−12.1%
1991	85	−22.0%
2001	104	+22.4%
2011	78	−25.0%
2021	84	+7.7%
Source: Censuses
