= Domažlice =

- Town
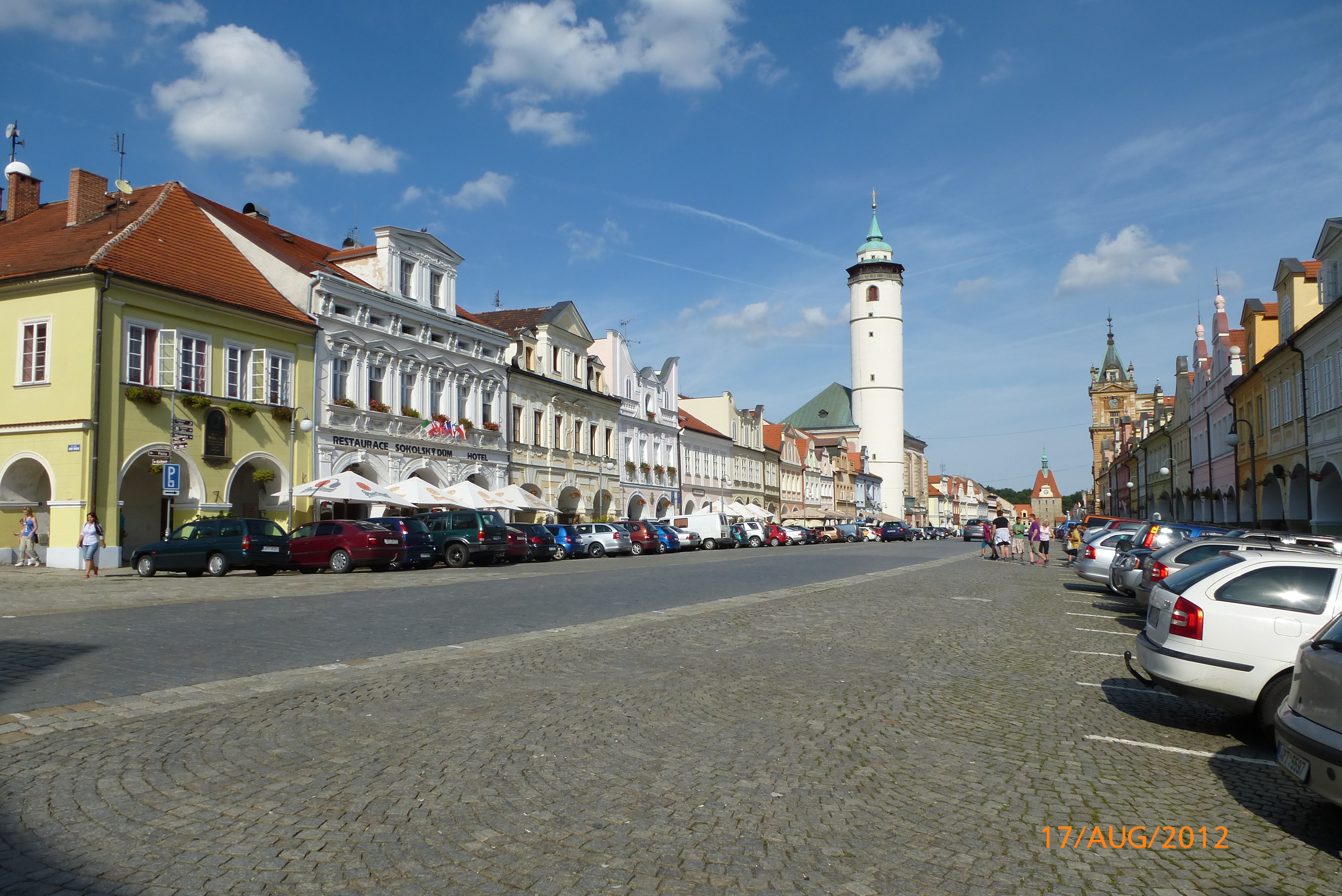
- Náměstí Míru square, historical centre

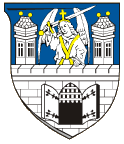
- Flag Coat of arms

- Location in the Czech Republic
- Coordinates: 49°26′26″N 12°55′38″E
- Country: Czech Republic
- Region: Plzeň
- District: Domažlice
- First mentioned: 993

Government
  - Mayor: Stanislav Antoš

Area
  - Total: 24.62 km^{2} (9.51 sq mi)
- Elevation: 428 m (1,404 ft)

Population (2026-01-01)
  - Total: 10,973
  - Density: 445.7/km^{2} (1,154/sq mi)
- Time zone: UTC+1 (CET)
  - Summer (DST): UTC+2 (CEST)
- Postal code: 344 01
- Website: www.domazlice.eu

Domažlice (Czech pronunciation: [ˈdomaʒlɪtsɛ]; German: Taus) is a town in the Plzeň Region of the Czech Republic. It has about 11,000 inhabitants. It is located in a hilly landscape near the border with Germany.

The settlement of Domažlice was founded in the 10th century. The royal town was founded on its site in 1265. Domažlice is known as one of the centres of the historical Chodsko region. The historic town centre is well preserved and is protected as an urban monument reservation.

== Administrative division ==
Domažlice consists of six municipal parts (in brackets population according to the 2021 census):

- Bezděkovské Předměstí (2,233)
- Dolejší Předměstí (577)
- Havlovice (269)
- Hořejší Předměstí (2,677)
- Město (729)
- Týnské Předměstí (4,387)

== Geography ==
Domažlice is located about 44 kilometres (27 mi) southwest of Plzeň. It lies mostly in the Podčeskoleská Hills. A small part of the municipal territory in the southwest extends into the Cham-Furth Depression and includes the highest point of Domažlice, the hill Dmout at 603 m (1,978 ft) above sea level. The Zubřina Stream flows through the town.

== History ==
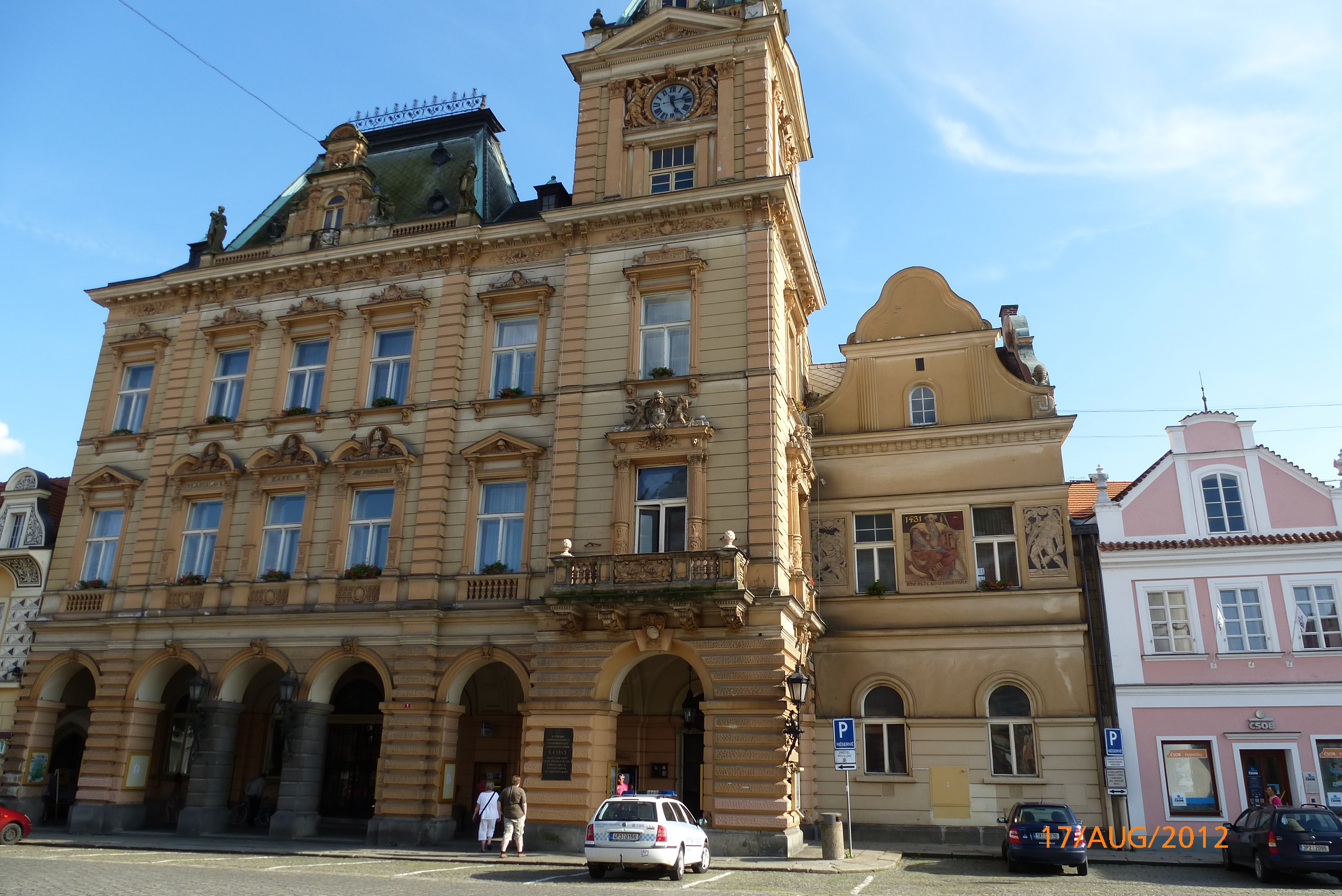
Town hall

The first written mention of Domažlice settlement is in a deed of Duke Boleslaus II from 993. Purpose of its existence was related to the Bohemian-Bavarian border and important trade route to Regensburg.

Near that settlement, a fortified royal town of Domažlice was founded by King Ottokar II in 1265. The town included a royal castle. The border with Bavaria was protected by border guards recruited from the Chods (Slavic free farmers) who settled in the vicinity of Domažlice.

The town was mortgaged to Bavaria in 1331, lasting until 1419 (with some interruptions). Under Hussite rule, German citizens were expelled from the town, and since then, the population has been predominantly Czech. In 1431, Prokop the Great defeated the crusaders of the Holy Roman Empire in the Battle of Domažlice. The 15th and 16th centuries saw Domažlice change hands frequently, but its importance diminished following the end of the Thirty Years' War. It was not until 1770 that it recovered, largely due to innovations in the textile industry.

Until 1918, the town was part of Austria-Hungary, in the district with the same name, being one of the 94 Bezirkshauptmannschaften (district capitals) in Bohemia.

Within the context of the Czech National Revival, Domažlice became a central place during the 19th century. At the time, it was the westernmost ethnic Czech town, very close to the border with the Kingdom of Bavaria. In the town, a pilgrimage took place on 13 August 1939, which developed into a large Czech protest demonstration against the German occupation and control of the ethnic Czech Protectorate of Bohemia and Moravia. The German population was expelled in 1945 according to the Potsdam Agreement.

In 2005, a mass grave was discovered on the outskirts of the town. It contained 54 Germans, who might have been mainly members of the local SA, executed by the Czech resistance at the end of World War II.

== Demographics ==
Historical population

Year	Pop.	±%
1869	7,319	—
1880	7,745	+5.8%
1890	8,046	+3.9%
1900	7,907	−1.7%
1910	8,555	+8.2%

Year	Pop.	±%
1921	8,049	−5.9%
1930	9,406	+16.9%
1950	8,995	−4.4%
1961	7,723	−14.1%
1970	9,044	+17.1%

Year	Pop.	±%
1980	11,256	+24.5%
1991	11,519	+2.3%
2001	11,048	−4.1%
2011	10,997	−0.5%
2021	10,872	−1.1%

Source: Censuses

== Transport ==
Domažlice is the terminus and start of the railway lines from/to Plzeň and Klatovy.

== Sport ==
The town's football club TJ Jiskra Domažlice plays in the Bohemian Football League (third tier of the Czech football league system).

The Sněhaři Domažlice ski club was founded in 1912 and restored in 1996.

== Sights ==
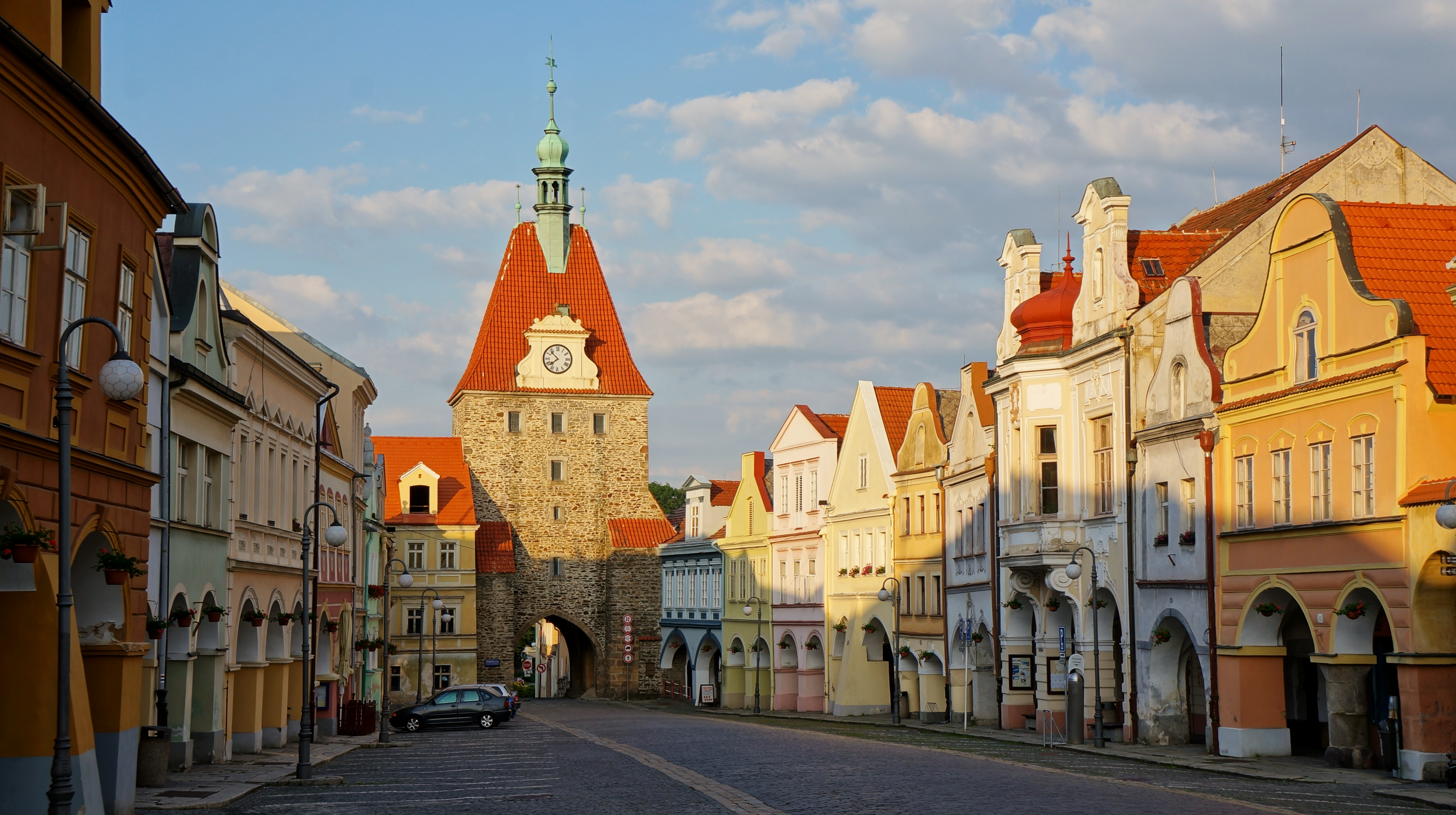
Dolejší Gate on the Míru Square

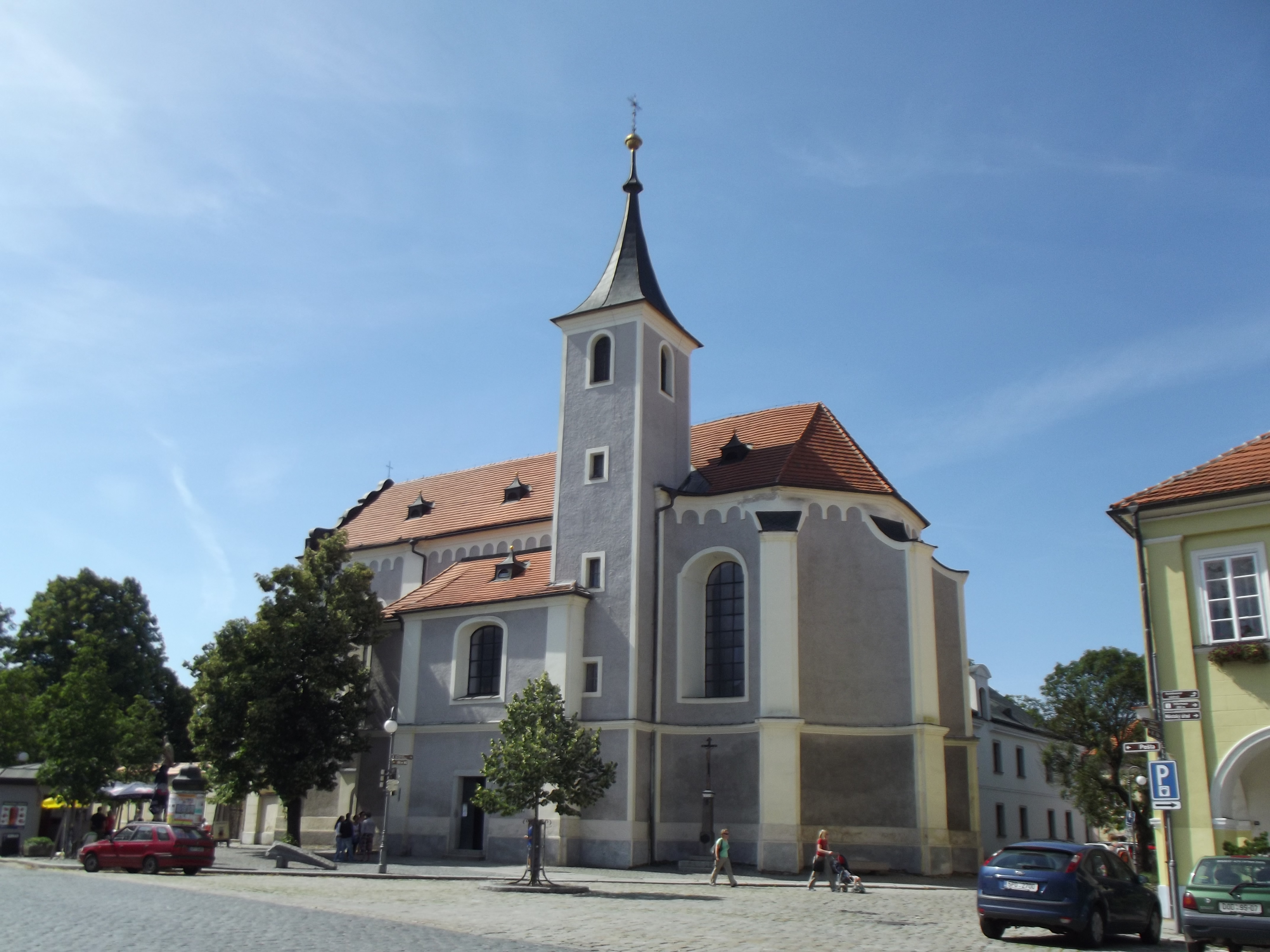
Church of the Assumption of the Virgin Mary

The historical core of Domažlice is well preserved and includes many monuments and valuable buildings. The old town was defined by walls, of which fragments and the early Gothic gate (so-called Dolejší, i.e. 'lower') have been preserved. Most of the houses are Gothic and Renaissance buildings from the 14th–16th centuries with Neoclassical façades. The architecturally valuable Neo-Renaissance town hall on the town square was built in 1890–1893.

In the centre of the town square is the Church of the Nativity of the Virgin Mary. It was first mentioned in 1385. It was rebuilt in the Baroque style in 1751–1756, but retained Gothic elements. It is known for its leaning, 56 m (184 ft) high tower.

The former Augustinian monastery is a landmark of the western part of the town square. The monastery was founded in 1287. After it was destroyed during the Hussite Wars, it was restored in 1671–1746. Today the building serves as an elementary art school. The neighbouring monastery Church of the Assumption of the Virgin Mary from the 14th century was rebuilt in the Baroque style in 1746–1752, further reconstructions took place in 1774 and 1892–1893.

Chodský Castle was founded together with the town in the 1260s. Until the early 16th century, it had the function of an administrative seat. It became a ruin after two fires in the 16th century. In 1726–1728, a salt storage was built on the site of the castle, designed by Kilian Ignaz Dientzenhofer. A perimeter wall and a cylindrical tower have been preserved from the original castle. In the second half of the 19th century, it served as the municipal office. During the 20th century, the building gradually became the seat of the Museum of Chodsko Region. The tower is open to the public as a lookout tower.

The Church of Saint Lawrence on the hill Veselá hora is a pilgrimage site. It was built in 1685 and rebuilt in 1775.

== Notable people ==
- Božena Němcová (1820–1862), writer
- Ladislav Klíma (1878–1928), philosopher and novelist
- Václav Melzer (1878–1968), mycologist
- František Michl (1901–1977), painter and graphic artist
- Jan Smudek (1915–1999), resistance fighter
- Václav Jehlička (born 1948), politician
- Miloslav Sláma (born 1970), serial killer
- Jiří Vaněk (born 1978), tennis player and coach
- Karel Novy (born 1980), Swiss swimmer
- Haruka Kitaguchi (born 1998), Japanese javelin thrower; lives here

== Twin towns – sister cities ==
Domažlice is twinned with:

- Furth bei Göttweig, Austria
- Furth im Wald, Germany
- Ludres, France
- Two Rivers, United States
